= James Golka =

American Catholic prelate (born 1966)

His Excellency, The Most Reverend James Golka
- Metropolitan Archbishop of Denver
- Archdiocese: Denver
- Appointed: February 7, 2026
- Installed: March 25, 2026
- Predecessor: Samuel J. Aquila
- Previous post: Bishop of Colorado Springs (2021-2026)

Orders
- Ordination: June 3, 1994 by Lawrence James McNamara
- Consecration: June 29, 2021 by Samuel J. Aquila, Joseph G. Hanefeldt, and Michael John Sheridan

Personal details
- Born: September 22, 1966 (age 60) Grand Island, Nebraska, US
- Education: Creighton University; Saint Paul Seminary
- Motto: Stewards of God's mysteries
- Styles
- Reference style: His Excellency; The Most Reverend
- Spoken style: Your Excellency
- Religious style: Archbishop

James Robert Golka (born September 22, 1966) is an American Catholic prelate who has served as Archbishop of Denver since 2026. He previously served as Bishop of Colorado Springs from 2021 to 2026.

== Biography ==
=== Early life ===
Golka was born on September 22, 1966, in Grand Island, Nebraska, one of ten children of Robert and Patricia Golka. He attended Grand Island Central Catholic High School, where he played football. During his time at Creighton University in Omaha, Nebraska, Golka began talking about going into the priesthood with Jesuit priests.

Golka graduated from Creighton with degrees in philosophy and theology. In 1989, he spent a year volunteering at a high school on the Pine Ridge Indian Reservation in South Dakota in what he called a test of his desire to become a priest.

Golka entered the Saint Paul Seminary in St. Paul, Minnesota, in 1990. While a seminarian, he studied Spanish in Guatemala. He graduated with Master of Divinity and Master of Sacramental Theology degrees in 1994.

=== Priesthood ===
On June 3, 1994, Golka was ordained to the priesthood at the Cathedral of the Nativity of the Blessed Virgin Mary in Grand Island, Nebraska, for the Diocese of Grand Island by Bishop Lawrence McNamara.

After his 1994 ordination, the diocese assigned Golka as associate pastor of St. James Parish in Kearney, Nebraska, and Holy Rosary in Alliance, Nebraska. Six years later, in 2000, the diocese appointed him as pastor of Our Lady of Guadalupe Parish in Scottsbluff, Nebraska, and in 2006 as pastor of St. Patrick's Parish in North Platte, Nebraska. In 2016, he became pastor of the Cathedral of the Nativity of the Blessed Virgin Mary.

Golka's diocesan positions included: director of ongoing formation of clergy, director of diocesan youth retreats, chair of the Federation of the liturgical commission and of the personnel board, and memberships on the finance council, the presbyteral council, and the pension board.

=== Bishop of Colorado Springs ===
Coat of arms as Bishop of Colorado Springs

Pope Francis appointed Golka bishop of the Diocese of Colorado Springs on April 30, 2021. On June 29, 2021, Golka was consecrated at Holy Apostles Church in Colorado Springs by Archbishop Samuel J. Aquila, with Bishops Joseph G. Hanefeldt, and Michael Sheridan serving as co-consecrators.

In November 2022, after the mass shooting at the Club Q nightclub in Colorado Springs in which five people died, Golka expressed his concern that LGBTQ individuals had been targeted by the shooter.

=== Metropolitan Archbishop of Denver ===
Pope Leo XIV appointed Golka as metropolitan archbishop for the Metropolitan Archdiocese of Denver on February 7, 2026. He was installed on March 25, 2026.

== See also ==
- Catholic Church hierarchy
- Catholic Church in the United States
- Historical list of the Catholic bishops of the United States
- List of Catholic bishops of the United States
- Lists of patriarchs, archbishops, and bishops

== Episcopal succession ==
Catholic Church titles
Preceded by Michael John Sheridan	Bishop of Colorado Springs; 2021-2026	Succeeded by Sede Vacante
Preceded by Samuel J. Aquila	Archbishop of Denver; 2026-present	Succeeded by Incumbent
