= John Joseph Sullivan (bishop) =

Catholic bishop (1920–2001)

His Excellency, The Most Reverend John Joseph Sullivan
- Bishop of Kansas City-St. Joseph
- See: Diocese of Kansas City-St. Joseph
- In office: 1977–1993
- Previous posts: Bishop of Grand Island (1972 to 1977)

Orders
- Ordination: September 23, 1944 by Albert Lewis Fletcher
- Consecration: September 19, 1972 by John R. Quinn

Personal details
- Born: July 5, 1920 Horton, Kansas, U.S.
- Died: February 11, 2001 (aged 80) Jeanne Jugan Center, Kansas City, Missouri, U.S.
- Denomination: Roman Catholic
- Parents: Walter and Mary (née Berney) Sullivan
- Education: St. Benedict's College; Kenrick Seminary
- Motto: Come Lord Jesus

John Joseph Sullivan (July 5, 1920 – February 11, 2001) was an American prelate of the Roman Catholic Church. He served as bishop of the Diocese of Grand Island in Nebraska (1972–1977) and bishop of the Diocese of Kansas City-St. Joseph in Missouri (1977–1993).

== Biography ==
=== Early life ===
John Sullivan was born on July 5, 1920, in Horton, Kansas, to Walter and Mary (née Berney) Sullivan. His father worked for the Electro-Motive Company. When he was age ten, his family to Oklahoma City, Oklahoma. John received his early education at the parochial schools of the Cathedral of Our Lady of Perpetual Help, where he also served as an altar boy to Bishop Francis Kelley. He attended St. Benedict's College in Atchison, Kansas, for two years before entering Kenrick Seminary in St. Louis, Missouri, in 1939.

=== Priesthood ===
Sullivan was ordained to the priesthood by Bishop Albert Lewis Fletcher on September 23, 1944, for the Diocese of Oklahoma City-Tulsa at the Cathedral of Our Lady of Perpetual Help in Oklahoma City.

Following his ordination, Sullivan became a curate at Holy Family Cathedral Parish in Tulsa, Oklahoma. He also served as director of Catholic Activities and as chaplain at the University of Tulsa in Tulsa. Bishop Eugene J. McGuinness originally intended for Sullivan to study canon law at the Catholic University of America, but instead assigned him as pastor of St. Mary's Parish in Guthrie, Oklahoma, in 1947.

While in Guthrie, he recruited college students to work as volunteers among the poor. Sullivan became pastor of St. James Parish in Oklahoma City in 1959. From 1961 to 1968, he was national director of lay volunteers for the Catholic Church Extension Society. Returning to Tulsa, he was named pastor of the Church of the Madalene Parish and episcopal vicar for Eastern Oklahoma.

=== Bishop of Grand Island ===
On July 25, 1972, Sullivan was appointed the fifth bishop of Grand Island by Pope Paul VI. He received his episcopal consecration at the Tulsa Civic Center on September 19, 1972, from Archbishop John R. Quinn, with Bishops John L. May and Charles Buswell serving as co-consecrators. He was installed at the Cathedral of the Nativity of the Blessed Virgin Mary in Grand Island on September 21, 1972.

=== Bishop of Kansas City-Saint Joseph ===
Sullivan was named the sixth bishop of Kansas City-St. Joseph by Paul VI on June 27, 1977. He was installed on August 17, 1977. After being diagnosed with Parkinson's disease, Sullivan petitioned the Vatican for early retirement. Pope John Paul II accepted his retirement as bishop of Kansas City-Saint Joseph on June 22, 1993.

John Sullivan died on February 11, 2001, at the Jeanne Jugan Center in Kansas City, Missouri at age 80.

Catholic Church titles
Preceded by John Linus Paschang	Bishop of Grand Island; 1972–1977	Succeeded by Lawrence James McNamara
Preceded by Charles Herman Helmsing	Bishop of Kansas City-St. Joseph; 1977–1993	Succeeded by Raymond James Boland
