= William Joseph Dendinger =

American Catholic prelate and former Air Force general (born 1939)

His Excellency, The Most Reverend William Joseph Dendinger
- Bishop Emeritus of Grand Island
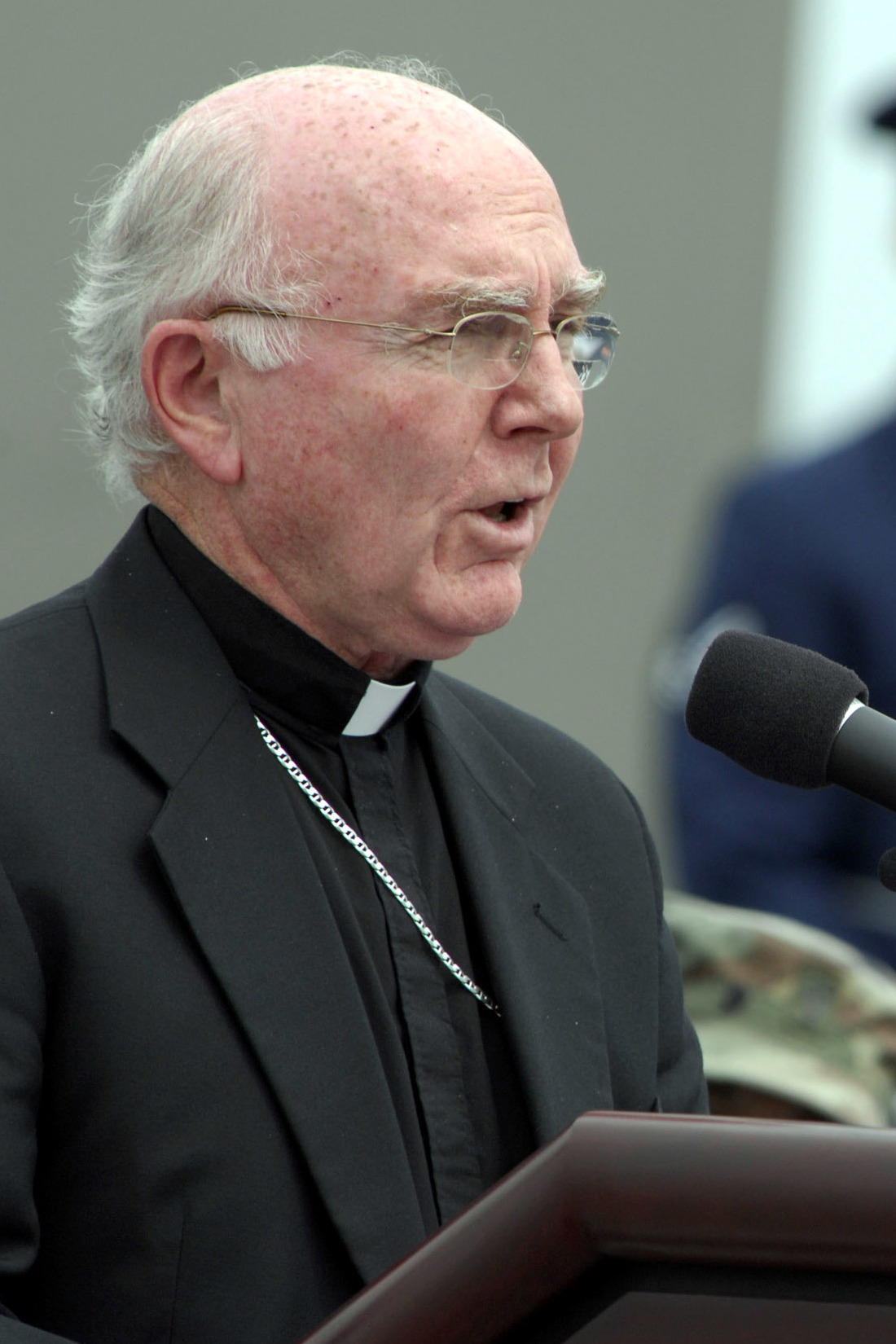
- Dendinger in 2007
- Diocese: Grand Island
- Appointed: October 14, 2004
- Installed: December 13, 2004
- Retired: January 14, 2015
- Predecessor: Lawrence James McNamara
- Successor: Joseph G. Hanefeldt

Orders
- Ordination: May 29, 1965 by Gerald Thomas Bergan
- Consecration: December 13, 2004 by Elden Francis Curtiss, Fabian Bruskewitz, and Lawrence James McNamara

Personal details
- Born: May 20, 1939 (age 87) Coleridge, Nebraska, U.S.
- Education: Immaculate Conception Seminary; Aquinas Institute of Theology; Creighton University
- Motto: Justice with mercy

Styles of William Joseph Dendinger
- Reference style: His Excellency; The Most Reverend
- Spoken style: Your Excellency
- Religious style: Bishop

William Joseph Dendinger (born May 20, 1939) is an American Catholic prelate and former major general of the Air Force who served as bishop of the Grand Island in Nebraska from 2004 until 2015.

Before he was appointed bishop, Dendinger served 31 years in the United States Air Force Chaplain Corps, eventually becoming chief of the Corps.

== Biography ==
=== Early years ===
William Dendinger was born on May 20, 1939, in Coleridge, Nebraska, the youngest of the six children of David and Regina Dendinger. Raised on a farm, he was a member of the first graduating class of Mount Michael High School in Elkhorn, Nebraska, in 1957. Dendinger then studied at the Immaculate Conception Seminary in Conception, Missouri, where he earned a Bachelor of Arts in philosophy in 1961. Dendinger then entered the Aquinas Institute of Theology in Dubuque, Iowa, earning his Master of Theology degree in 1964.

=== Priesthood ===
On May 29, 1965, Dendinger was ordained by Archbishop Gerald Bergan to the priesthood for the Archdiocese of Omaha. After his ordination, Dendinger taught at St. Edward Central Catholic High School in Elgin, Nebraska. He obtained his Master of Science in counseling degree from Creighton University in 1969.

=== US Air Force chaplain ===
In 1970, Dendinger was commissioned into the United States Air Force Chaplain Corps. After four men from Elgin died during the Vietnam War, he had decided to become a military chaplain. During his time in the Chaplain Corps, Dendinger was assigned as base chaplain at Maxwell Air Force Base in Montgomery, Alabama, Yokota Air Base in Tokyo, Japan, Osan Air Base in Pyeongtaek, South Korea, Mather Air Force Base in Sacramento, California and Hahn Air Base in West Germany.

In 1974, Dendinger was appointed cadet wing chaplain at the U.S. Air Force Academy, serving there for four years. He also served on the chaplain resource board for the U.S. Air Force Chaplain Service Institute at Maxwell AFB from 1982 to 1985. In 1995, Dendinger was appointed deputy chief of the Chaplain Corps, stationed in Washington, D.C. In 1997, he became the chief of the Chaplain Corps in Washington. Dendinger retired from the Air Force in 2001 as a two-star general. His first civilian posting was as pastor of St. Stephen the Martyr Parish in Omaha.

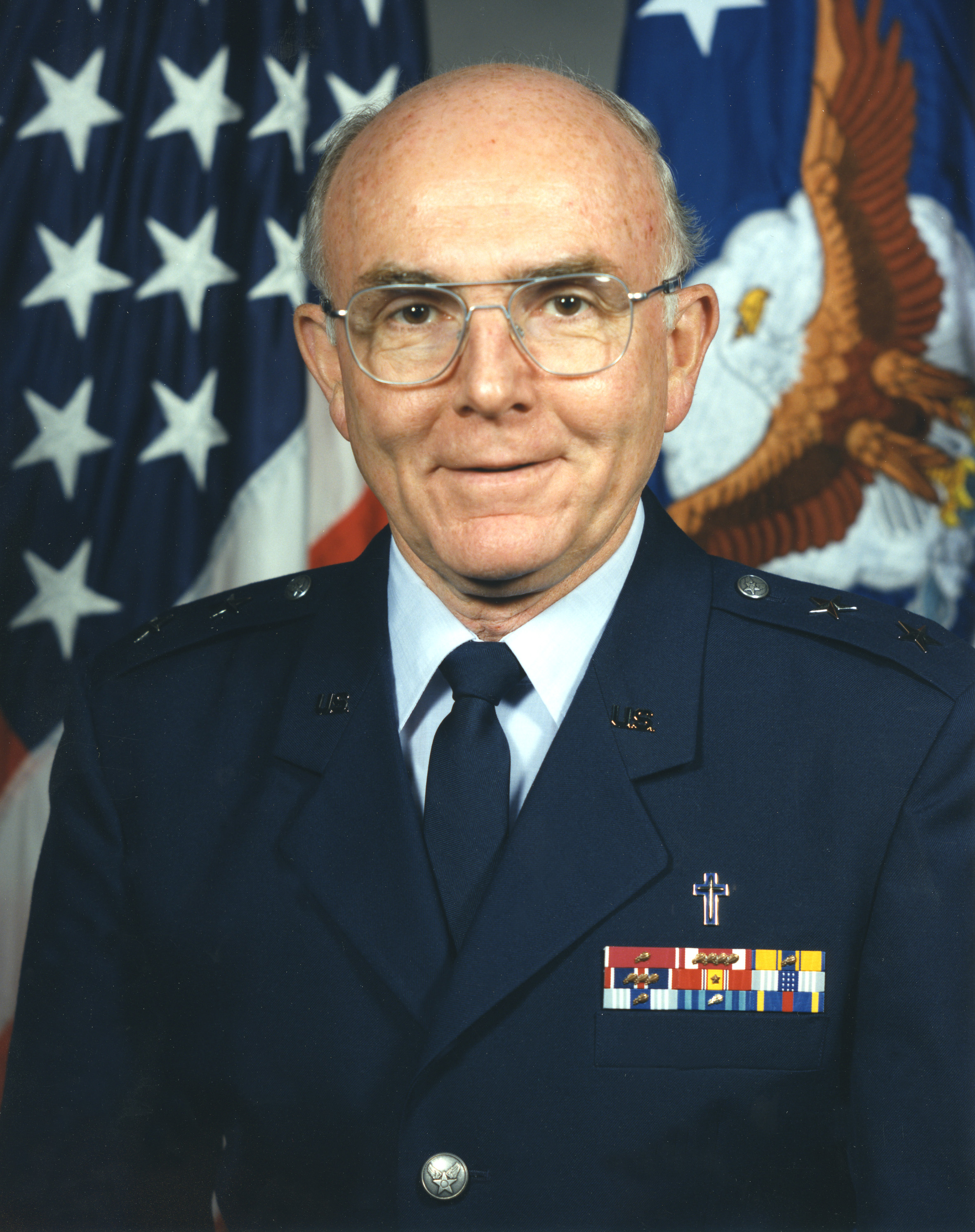
Dendinger as the 13th Chief of the US Air Force Chaplain Corps.

=== Bishop of Grand Island ===
On October 14, 2004, Pope John Paul II appointed Dendinger as bishop of Grand Island. He was consecrated at St. Mary's Cathedral in Grand Island, Nebraska, on December 13, 2004, by Archbishop Elden Curtiss. Bishops Fabian Bruskewitz and Lawrence McNamara served as co-consecrators.

=== Retirement ===
On January 14, 2015, Pope Francis accepted Dendinger's letter of resignation as bishop of Grand Island and appointed Monsignor Joseph G. Hanefeldt as his replacement. After retirement, Dendinger celebrated masses in diocese churches for priests on vacation.

== Awards and military decorations ==
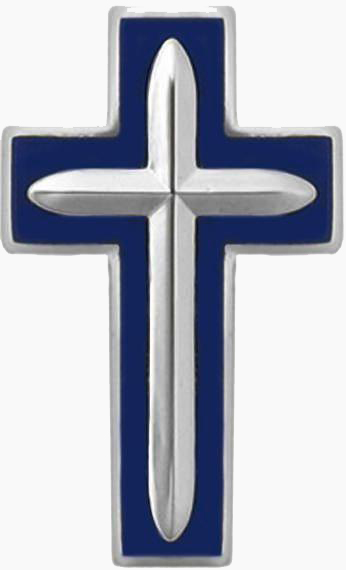

Badge	Air Force Christian Chaplain Badge		
1st Row		Air Force Distinguished Service Medal	
2nd Row	Legion of Merit with one bronze oak leaf cluster	Meritorious Service Medal with four oak leaf clusters	Air Force Commendation Medal with oak leaf cluster
3rd Row	Air Force Outstanding Unit Award with three oak leaf clusters	National Defense Service Medal with one bronze service star	Air Force Overseas Ribbon - Short
4th Row	Air Force Overseas Ribbon - Long with oak leaf cluster	Air Force Longevity Service Award Ribbon with silver and bronze oak leaf clusters	Air Force Training Ribbon

== See also ==
- Catholic Church hierarchy
- Catholic Church in the United States
- Historical list of the Catholic bishops of the United States
- List of Catholic bishops of the United States
- Lists of patriarchs, archbishops, and bishops

== Episcopal succession ==
Catholic Church titles
Preceded by Lawrence James McNamara	Bishop of Grand Island; 2004–2015	Succeeded by Joseph G. Hanefeldt
Preceded by Arthur S. Thomas	Chief of Chaplains of the United States Air Force; 1995–1997	Succeeded by Lorraine K. Potter
