= Lawrence James McNamara =

Catholic bishop (1928–2004)

His Excellency, The Most Reverend Lawrence James McNamara
- Bishop of Grand Island
- Church: Roman Catholic Church
- See: Diocese of Grand Island
- Predecessor: John Joseph Sullivan
- Successor: William Joseph Dendinger

Orders
- Ordination: May 30, 1953 by Edwin Vincent O'Hara
- Consecration: March 28, 1978 by Archbishop Daniel Sheehan

Personal details
- Born: August 5, 1928 Chicago, Illinois, US
- Died: December 17, 2004 (aged 76) Grand Island, Nebraska, US
- Education: St. Paul Seminary; Catholic University of America

Styles of Lawrence NcNamara
- Reference style: The Most Reverend
- Spoken style: Your Excellency
- Religious style: Bishop
- Posthumous style: none

Lawrence James McNamara (August 5, 1928 – December 17, 2004) was an American prelate of the Roman Catholic Church. He served as bishop of the Diocese of Grand Island in Nebraska from 1978 to 2004.

== Biography ==
=== Early life ===
McNamara was born on August 5, 1928, in Chicago, Illinois. He attended Archbishop Quigley Preparatory Seminary in Chicago, then went to St. Paul Seminary in St. Paul, Minnesota. McNamara finished his education at the Catholic University of America in Washington, D.C., where he earned a degree in theology.

=== Priesthood ===
McNamara was ordained a priest at the Cathedral of the Immaculate Conception in Kansas City, Missouri for the Diocese of Kansas City-St. Joseph, Missouri, on May 30, 1953, by Bishop Edwin Vincent O’Hara. He also held an honorary degree of Doctor of Laws from Benedictine College in Atchison, Kansas. McNamara held numerous diocesan and civic posts in the Kansas City area. He was a parish priest and high school teacher, diocesan refugee resettlement director, chair of the United Campaign Agency Executives Association, chaplain of the Jackson County Jail, and president of the Kansas City Citizens' Alliance for the War on Poverty. He was also a board member of the Human Resources Commission of Kansas City, the State Committee on Aging, and the Jackson County Civil Rights Commission and was moderator of the diocesan Family Life Bureau.

McNamara was known for his work in reorganizing and enlarging the scope of the Catholic Charities of the diocese. Under his direction of the agency (1957–1969), its efforts expanded to include programs in job opportunity training, remedial and adult basic education, tutoring for children in both Catholic and public schools, medically related services, family enrichment and pre-Cana programs, services to the elderly and housing programs. His agency sponsored the first Out of School Neighborhood Youth Corps Program in Kansas City. He also sponsored a community action program through the Office of Economic Opportunity to provide social work service to adolescent youth and teenage gangs, and a program for the training of unemployed adults.

McNamara served as chairman of the National Conference of Catholic Charities Commission on Housing from 1969 to 1972. He was the diocesan director for Catholic Relief Services (CRS), the overseas aid agency of American Catholics. In the latter capacity, he was sent in 1970 on a visitation of CRS programs in West Africa. He was appointed executive director of the Campaign for Human Development, United States Catholic Conference, in 1973 and served in that capacity for some five years.

=== Bishop of Grand Island ===
On January 10, 1978, McNamara was appointed the sixth bishop of Grand Island by Pope Paul VI. He received his episcopal consecration at the Cathedral of the Nativity of the Blessed Virgin Mary in Grand Island on March 28, 1978, from Archbishop Daniel Sheehan, with Bishops Charles Helmsing and John Sullivan serving as co-consecrators.

After his consecration as bishop, McNamara served as president of the National Catholic Rural Life Conference (1980–1983), president of the National Council of Catholic Bishops' Committees for Liaison with Women Religious, the American Board of Catholic Missions, the Campaign for Human Development and as national episcopal advisor for the Society of Saint Vincent de Paul in the United States. In his later years, he served as director of Catholic Relief Services; however, he stepped down in 1997 after staff members expressed outrage by his use of a racial slur during a meeting.

After reaching the mandatory retirement age of 75, McNamara resigned as bishop of Grand Island on October 14, 2004. He died two months later on December 17, 2004, in Grand Island at age 76.

== See also ==
- Catholic Church hierarchy
- Catholic Church in the United States
- Historical list of the Catholic bishops of the United States
- List of the Catholic bishops of the United States
- Lists of patriarchs, archbishops, and bishops

Catholic Church titles
Preceded by John Joseph Sullivan	Bishop of Grand Island; 1978–2004	Succeeded by William Joseph Dendinger
