= Joseph G. Hanefeldt =

American Catholic prelate (born 1958)

His Excellency, The Most Reverend Joseph Gerard Hanefeldt
- Bishop of Grand Island
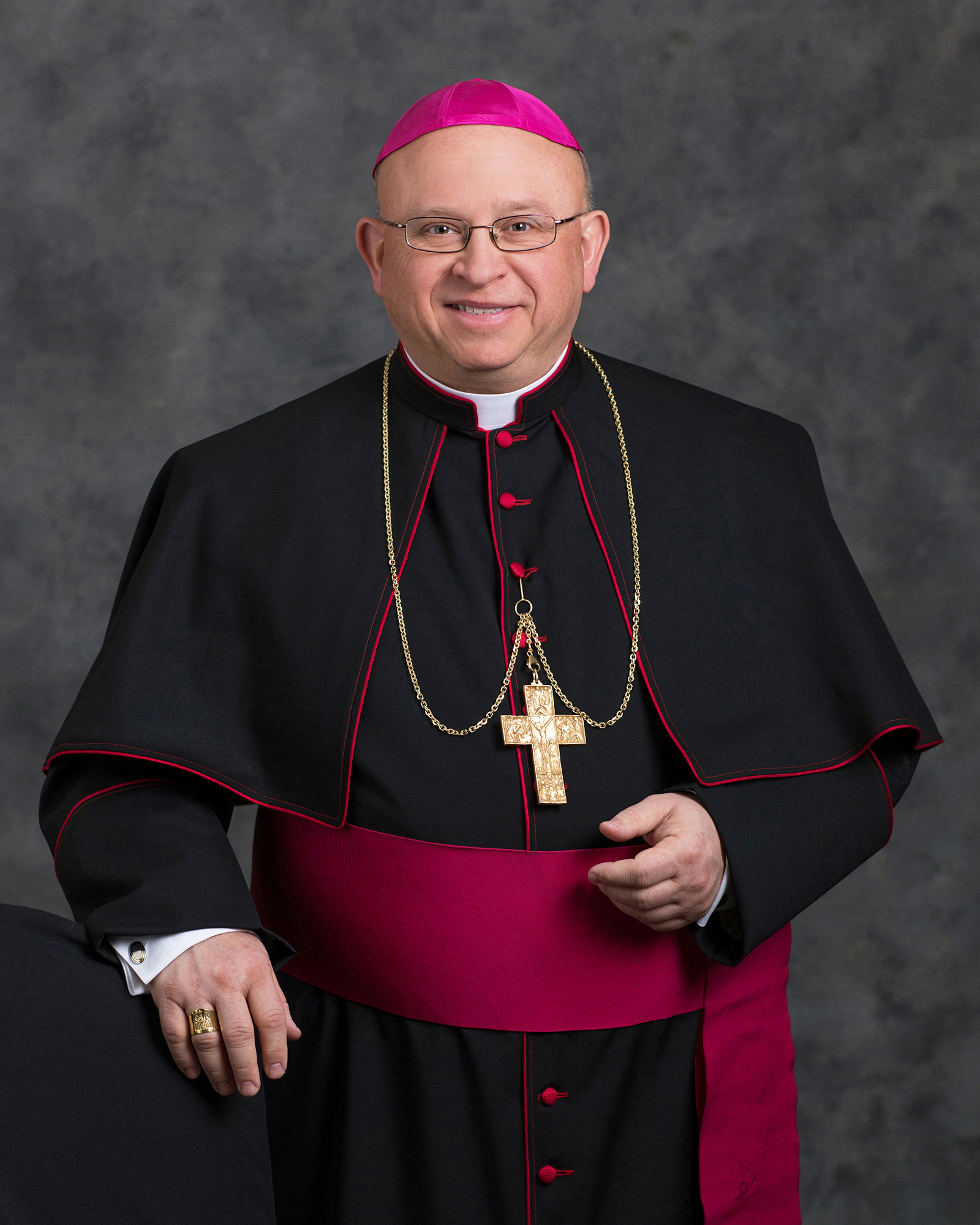
- Hanefeldt in 2015
- Church: Catholic Church
- Diocese: Grand Island
- Appointed: January 14, 2015
- Installed: March 19, 2015
- Predecessor: William Joseph Dendinger

Orders
- Ordination: July 14, 1984 by Jean Jadot
- Consecration: March 19, 2015 by George Joseph Lucas, Lee A. Piché, and Robert Dwayne Gruss

Personal details
- Born: April 25, 1958 (age 68) Creighton, Nebraska, US
- Education: University of St. Thomas; Pontifical Gregorian University; Pontifical Atheneum of St. Anselm
- Motto: Remain in me

Styles of Joseph Gerard Hanefeldt
- Reference style: His Excellency; The Most Reverend
- Spoken style: Your Excellency
- Religious style: Bishop

Joseph Gerard Hanefeldt (born April 25, 1958) is an American prelate of the Catholic Church. He has been serving as bishop of the Latin Church Diocese of Grand Island in Nebraska in the United States since 2015.

== Biography ==
=== Early life and education ===
Joseph Hanefeldt was born on April 25, 1958, in Creighton, Nebraska, to Helen and Adolph Hanefeldt. He has two brothers and one sister. He attended St. Ludger Catholic School and then high school at Creighton Public School, graduating in 1976.

After finishing high school, Hanefeldt decided to become a priest. He began his studies for the priesthood in 1976 at St. John Vianney College Seminary at the University of St. Thomas in St. Paul, Minnesota. He graduated from St. Thomas in 1980 with a Bachelor of Arts in sociology.

Hanefeldt traveled to Rome in 1980 to study theology at the Pontifical Gregorian University. He received a Bachelor of Sacred Theology from the Gregorian in 1983. That same year, he was ordained as a transitional deacon at St. Peter's Basilica. In 1984, he started his study of sacramental theology at the Pontifical Atheneum of St. Anselm in Rome, receiving a Licentiate in Sacramental Theology.

=== Priesthood ===
Hanefeldt was ordained a priest at St. Ludger parish church by Archbishop Jean Jadot for the Archdiocese of Omaha on July 14, 1984. After his ordination, the archdiocese assigned Hanefeldt as parochial vicar at the following parishes in Nebraska:

- St. Mary in West Point (1984 to 1988)
- St. Joan of Arc in Omaha (1988 to 1992). He was also named director of the diocesan Pro-Life Office, a position he would hold for the next 24 years.

Hanefeldt was named pastor of St. Joseph Parish in Omaha in 1992 and moderator of the diocesan Council of Catholic Women. He left St. Joseph in 1995 to become pastor of St. Elizabeth Seton Parish in Omaha.

In 2007, the oversight board of the Pontifical North American College in Rome appointed Hanefeldt as its spiritual director. In 2009, the board appointed him as director of the spiritual formation program. Pope Benedict XVI named him a chaplain of his holiness in December 2010. After Hanefeldt returned to Omaha in 2012, the archdiocese assigned him as pastor of Christ the King Parish in that city.

=== Bishop of Grand Island ===
Hanefeldt was named the eighth bishop of Grand Island by Pope Francis on January 14, 2015. His episcopal ordination took place on March 19, 2015, at the Cathedral of the Nativity of the Blessed Virgin Mary in Grand Island, Nebraska. He was ordained by Archbishop George Lucas, with Auxiliary Bishop Lee A. Piché and Bishop Robert Dwayne Gruss acting as co-consecrators.

In December 2018, Hanefeldt sent Reverend John Kakkuzhiyil to a facility to treat his depression and alcohol abuse. In January 2019, Kakkuzhiyil was arrested on charges of first degree sexual assault. A woman said that Kakkuzhiyil sexually assaulted her after she passed out from drinking; he stated that they had consensual sex. Kakkuzhiyil was acquitted of the charges in July 2019.

Bishop Hanefeldt's personal coat of arms

== See also ==
- Catholic Church in the United States
- Hierarchy of the Catholic Church
- Historical list of the Catholic bishops of the United States
- List of Catholic bishops in the United States
- Lists of popes, patriarchs, primates, archbishops, and bishops

Catholic Church titles
Preceded by William Joseph Dendinger	Bishop of Grand Island; 2015–present	Incumbent
