= Aloysius John Wycisło =

American Roman Catholic Church prelate (1908–2005)

His Excellency, The Most Reverend Aloysius John Wycisło
- Bishop of Green Bay
- Diocese: Green Bay
- Appointed: March 8, 1968
- Installed: May 10, 1983
- Predecessor: Stanislaus Bona
- Successor: Adam Maida
- Other posts: Titular Bishop of Stadia (1960–1968)
- Previous post: Auxiliary Bishop of Chicago (1960–1968)

Orders
- Ordination: April 4, 1934 by George Mundelein
- Consecration: December 21, 1960 by Albert Meyer

Personal details
- Born: Alojzy Jan Wycisło; June 17, 1908 Chicago, Illinois, U.S.
- Died: October 11, 2005 (aged 97) Green Bay, Wisconsin, US
- Education: Archbishop Quigley Preparatory Seminary; Mundelein Seminary; Catholic University of America
- Motto: Caritati instate (Be steadfast in charity)

Styles of Aloysius John Wycisło
- Reference style: His Excellency; The Most Reverend
- Spoken style: Your Excellency
- Religious style: Bishop

Aloysius John Wycisło (June 17, 1908 – October 11, 2005) was an American prelate of the Roman Catholic Church who served as the eighth bishop of the Diocese of Green Bay in Wisconsin from 1968 to 1983. Previously, he served as an auxiliary bishop for the Archdiocese of Chicago in Illinois from 1960 to 1968.

== Biography ==
=== Early life and education ===
Wycisło was born on June 17, 1908, to Simon and Victoria Czech Wycisło in Chicago, Illinois. He attended St. Mary of Czestochowa School in Cicero, Illinois; Archbishop Quigley Preparatory Seminary (high school) in Chicago; Mundelein Seminary at the St. Mary of the Lake Seminary in Mundelein, Illinois; and The Catholic University of America in Washington, D.C., where he earned a master's degree in social work.

=== Priesthood ===
Wycisło was ordained into the priesthood on April 7, 1934, by Cardinal George Mundelein at the University of St. Mary of the Lake. During World War II and into the 1950s, he served in Catholic War Relief Services, establishing refugee camps in the Middle East, India, and Africa. He later coordinated aid throughout Eastern and Western Europe for the Polish American Relief Organization. Wycisło was one of the first American priests to enter Poland after the war.He reported that the postwar communist government in Poland had forbidden mentioning the pope in the press and in Polish churches.

=== Auxiliary Bishop of Chicago ===
Wycisło was appointed as an auxiliary bishop of Chicago by Pope John XXIII on October 7, 1960. Wycisło was consecrated at Holy Name Cathedral in Chicago by Cardinal Albert Meyer on December 21, 1960.

In 1962, Meyer asked Wycisło to direct the archdiocesan observance of Poland's millennium of Christianity. Wycisło handled all the preparations, including arrangements for the visit of the primate of Poland, Cardinal Stefan Wyszyński.

Wycisło served as a council father from the first session of the Second Vatican Council in Rome, from 1962 to 1965. Wycisło served as a member of the American Bishops' Commissions on the Lay Apostolate and on the Missions and the Oriental Church. He met and became friends with Karol Wojtyła, then-Archbishop of Krakow in Poland, who later became Pope John Paul II.

=== Bishop of Green Bay ===
Wycisło was appointed bishop of Green Bay on March 8, 1968, by Pope Paul VI. Wycisło was installed on April 16, 1968. His episcopal motto was Caritati Instate (Be Steadfast in Charity).

=== Retirement and legacy ===
On June 17, 1983, his 75th birthday, Wycisło submitted his letter of resignation as bishop of Green Bay to the Vatican. He remained active during his retirement by performing confirmations.

On Aloysius Wycisło's death in Green Bay in 2005 at age 97, he was the oldest living bishop in the United States. He was also was one of the few living bishops who attended the Second Vatican Council.

== Publications ==
- Vatican Two Revisited; Reflections by One who was there
- The Saint Peter

== See also ==
- Catholic Church hierarchy
- Catholic Church in the United States
- Historical list of the Catholic bishops of the United States
- List of Catholic bishops of the United States
- Lists of patriarchs, archbishops, and bishops

Catholic Church titles
Preceded by Stanislaus Vincent Bona	Bishop of Green Bay; March 8, 1968 – May 10, 1983	Succeeded by Adam Maida
Preceded by –	Auxiliary Bishop of Chicago; 1960–1968	Succeeded by –
