= Stanislaus Vincent Bona =

Catholic bishop (1888–1967)

His Excellency, The Most Reverend Stanislaus Vincent Bona
- Bishop of Green Bay; Titular Bishop of Mela
- See: Diocese of Green Bay
- Appointed: December 2, 1944
- In office: 1944-1967
- Predecessor: Paul Peter Rhode
- Successor: Aloysius John Wycislo
- Previous posts: Bishop of Grand Island (1932–1944)

Orders
- Ordination: November 1, 1912
- Consecration: February 25, 1932 by George Mundelein, Paul Peter Rhode, and Francis Martin Kelly

Personal details
- Born: Stanisław Wincenty Bona; October 1, 1888 Chicago, Illinois, US
- Died: December 1, 1967 (aged 79) Green Bay, Wisconsin, US
- Denomination: Roman Catholic
- Parents: John and Catherine Bona
- Education: St. Stanislaus College (Chicago); Pontifical North American College
- Motto: Nomine tuo sit gloria (Glory be to Your name)

Styles of Stanislaus Vincent Bona
- Reference style: His Excellency; The Most Reverend
- Spoken style: Your Excellency
- Religious style: Bishop

Stanislaus Vincent Bona (October 1, 1888 – December 1, 1967) was an American prelate of the Roman Catholic Church. He served as bishop of the Diocese of Grand Island in Nebraska (1932–1944) and bishop of the Diocese of Green Bay in Wisconsin (1945–1967).

== Biography ==
=== Early life ===
Stanislaus Bona was born on October 1, 1888, in Chicago, Illinois, to John and Catherine (née Śmigiel) Bona, who had immigrated to the United States from Kingdom of Poland in 1881. Stanislaus had five siblings. His brother, Thomas P. Bona, was also a Roman Catholic priest and longtime pastor of St. Mary of Perpetual Help Parish in Chicago (1921–1950).

Stanislaus Bona attended St. Stanislaus College in Chicago, obtaining a Bachelor of Arts degree in 1905. He continued his studies at the Pontifical North American College in Rome, there earning a Doctor of Divinity degree and Licentiate of Canon Law.

=== Priesthood ===
Bona was ordained to the priesthood by Archbishop James Edward Quigley for the Archdiocese of Chicago in Rome on November 1, 1912. After his ordination, the archdiocese assigned Bona as a curate at St. Barbara Parish in Chicago. In 1916, he was named as resident chaplain at the Chicago House of Corrections. He later served as a professor at Archbishop Quigley Preparatory Seminary (1918–1922) and pastor of St. Casimir Parish, both in Chicago (1922–1931). The Vatican named Bona as a monsignor in 1931. He also served on the board of Religious Communities of Women.

=== Bishop of Grand Island ===
On December 18, 1931, Bona was appointed the second bishop of Grand Island by Pope Pius XI. He received his episcopal consecration on February 25, 1932, from Cardinal George Mundelein, with Bishops Paul Rhode and Francis Kelly serving as co-consecrators, at Holy Name Cathedral in Chicago. During World War II, Bona ministered to German and Italian prisoners of war kept in camps in the diocese.

=== Coadjutor Bishop and Bishop of Green Bay ===
On December 2, 1944, Bona was named coadjutor bishop of Green Bay and titular bishop of Mela by Pope Pius XII. He succeeded Bishop Paul Rhode as the seventh bishop of Green Bay upon the latter's death on March 3, 1945. During his tenure in Green Bay, Bona founded 67 grade schools, four high schools, Holy Family College in Manitowoc, Wisconsin, and Sacred Heart Seminary. He also established a diocesan newspaper and adjusted the social welfare program of Catholic Charities to meet new needs, including those of migrant workers. Bona attended all four sessions of the Second Vatican Council in Rome between 1962 and 1965.

=== Death and legacy ===
Bona died at age 79 in Green Bay on December 1, 1967. His cabin in Minong, Wisconsin, was listed on the National Register of Historic Places in 2020.

== See also ==
- Catholic Church hierarchy
- Catholic Church in the United States
- Historical list of the Catholic bishops of the United States
- List of Catholic bishops of the United States
- Lists of patriarchs, archbishops, and bishops

Catholic Church titles
Preceded by Paul Peter Rhode	Bishop of Green Bay; 1945–1967	Succeeded by Aloysius John Wycisło
Preceded by James Albert Duffy	Bishop of Grand Island; 1932–1944	Succeeded by Edward Joseph Hunkeler
