= Diocese of Grand Island =

Latin Catholic jurisdiction in Nebraska, US

Coordinates: 40°55′20″N 98°21′29″W

Diocese of Grand Island Dioecesis Insulae Grandis

Catholic
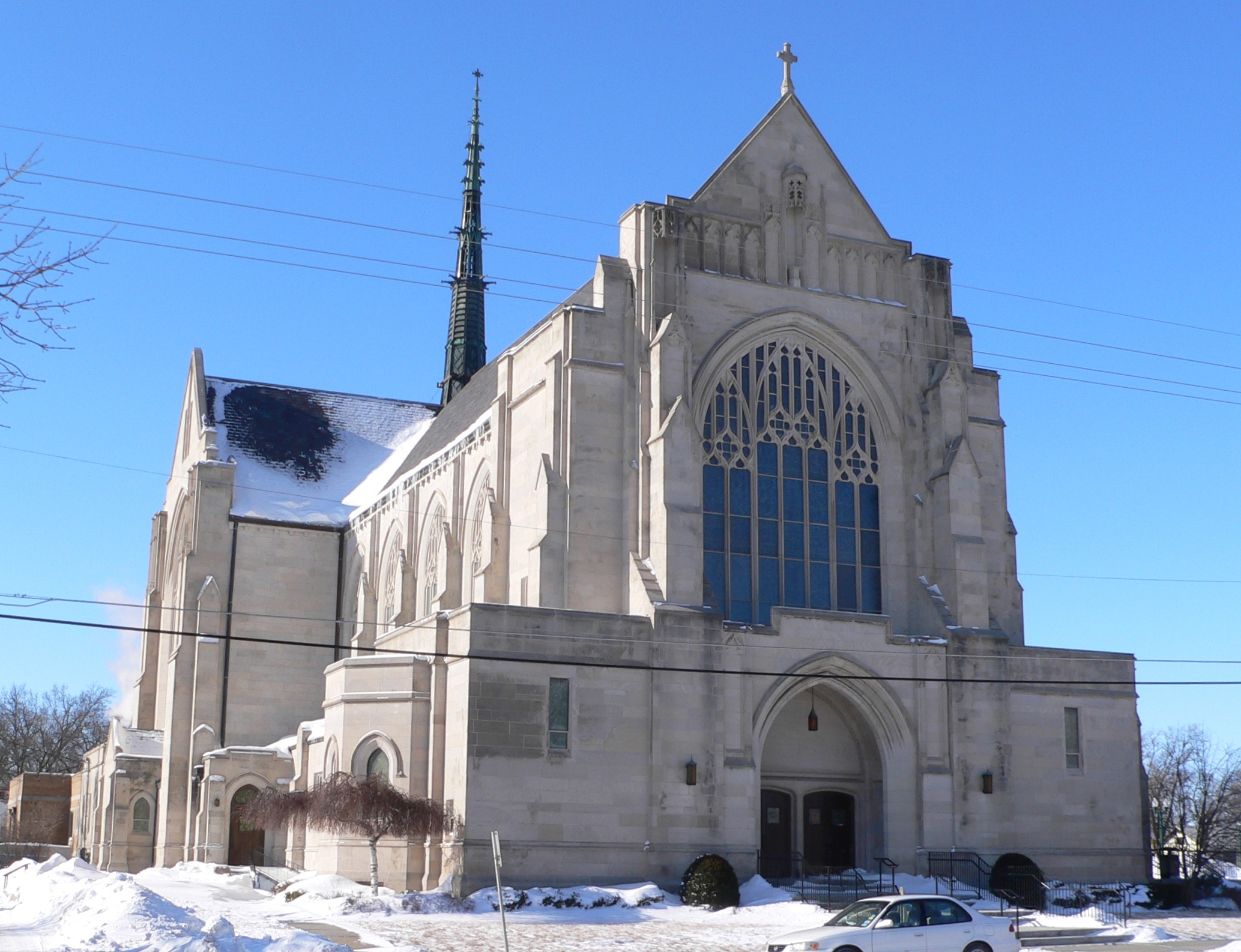
- Cathedral of the Nativity of the Blessed Virgin Mary

- Coat of arms

Location
- Country: United States
- Territory: 28 counties and the parts of Dawson, Lincoln and Keith counties north of the Platte River in central and western Nebraska
- Episcopal conference: United States Conference of Catholic Bishops
- Ecclesiastical region: Region IX
- Ecclesiastical province: Province of Omaha
- Metropolitan: Archdiocese of Omaha

Statistics
- Area: 42,024 sq mi (108,840 km^{2})
- Population: Total; Catholics: (as of 2023); ▲288,741; ▲48,363 (▲16.7%)
- Parishes: ▼67 (2023)
- Schools: 11

Information
- Denomination: Catholic Church
- Sui iuris church: Latin Church
- Rite: Roman Rite
- Established: Diocese of Kearney: March 8, 1912 (114 years ago); Diocese of Grand Island: April 11, 1917 (109 years ago)
- Cathedral: Cathedral of the Nativity of the Blessed Virgin Mary
- Patron saint: Blessed Virgin Mary
- Secular priests: ▼52 (diocesan) (2023); ▼1 (religious priest; ▲19 permanent deacons

Current leadership
- Pope: Leo XIV
- Bishop: Joseph G. Hanefeldt
- Metropolitan Archbishop: Michael George McGovern
- Bishops emeritus: William Joseph Dendinger

Map
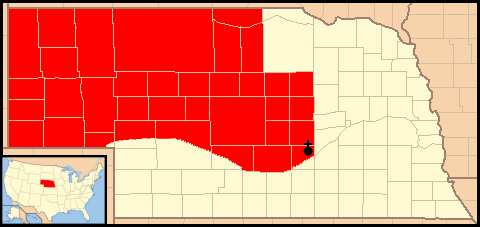

Website
- gidiocese.org

The Diocese of Grand Island (Latin: Dioecesis Insulae Grandis) is a diocese of the Catholic Church in northwestern and central Nebraska in the United States. It is a suffragan diocese of the Archdiocese of Omaha and is part of the ecclesiastical province of Omaha. Its cathedral is the Cathedral of the Nativity of the Blessed Virgin Mary in Grand Island. Joseph G. Hanefeldt has been bishop since March 19, 2015.

== History ==
The first Catholic missionary to visit present-day Nebraska was Pierre-Jean De Smet, a Jesuit missionary who crossed the Missouri River to baptize two infants of the Otoe people near present-day Bellevue in 1838. At that time, the area was under the jurisdiction of the Diocese of St. Louis. DeSmet later traveled along the Platte River to a council of the tribes.

Pope Pius IX in 1850 erected the Vicariate Apostolic of Indian Territory East of the Rocky Mountains. This huge jurisdiction contained the present-day states of Kansas, Nebraska, North and South Dakota, Colorado, Wyoming, and Montana. The pope named John Miège from St. Louis as the vicar apostolic. Four years later, in 1854, the US Congress created the Nebraska Territory, a vast area covering six future states.

=== 1850 to 1900 ===
In 1857, Pope Pius IX established the Apostolic Vicariate of Nebraska in territory split off from the Apostolic Vicariate of Indian Territory East of the Rocky Mountains. Nebraska achieved statehood in 1867.

The first Catholic presence in the present-day diocese was that of priest providing services to workers building the original Union Pacific Railroad along the Platte River. The first Catholic Church in Grand Island, St. Mary's, was a wooden structure erected in 1868. It was blown down by a windstorm before its dedication. It was replaced nine years later. The first church in Kearney was St. James, dedicated in 1871. In North Platte, the first Catholic church, St. Patrick, was finished in 1874.

The Vicariate of Nebraska was elevated to the Diocese of Omaha in 1885. Northwestern Nebraska would be part of this diocese for the next 27 years.

=== 1900 to 1945 ===
On March 8, 1912, Pope Pius X established the Diocese of Kearney on territory taken from the Diocese of Omaha. He named James Duffy of St. Paul as the first bishop of the new diocese. In 1916, the Vatican added more counties from the Diocese of Omaha to the Diocese of Kearney.

On April 11, 1917, the Diocese of Kearney was renamed the Diocese of Grand Island; the old name was later reused as a titular see. Duffy oversaw construction of the Cathedral of St. Mary from 1926 to 1928, and also established the Nebraska Register. Duffy retired in 1931 due to poor health.

The second bishop of Grand Island was Stanislaus Bona of the Archdiocese of Chicago. Bona was named coadjutor bishop of the Diocese of Green Bay in 1944.

=== 1945 to 1972 ===
Edward Hunkeler of Omaha was the next bishop of Grand Island, taking office in 1945. During his tenure in Grand Island, Hunkeler ordained 16 priests, and oversaw a large increase in the construction of new churches and other religious institutions. Hunkeler became bishop of the Diocese of Kansas City in Kansas in 1951.

John Paschang of Omaha was Hunkeler's successor. During his tenure, Paschang ordained 55 priests and established 33 churches, 15 parish houses, 13 schools, 11 parish centers, six convents, several rectories, and four hospital additions.

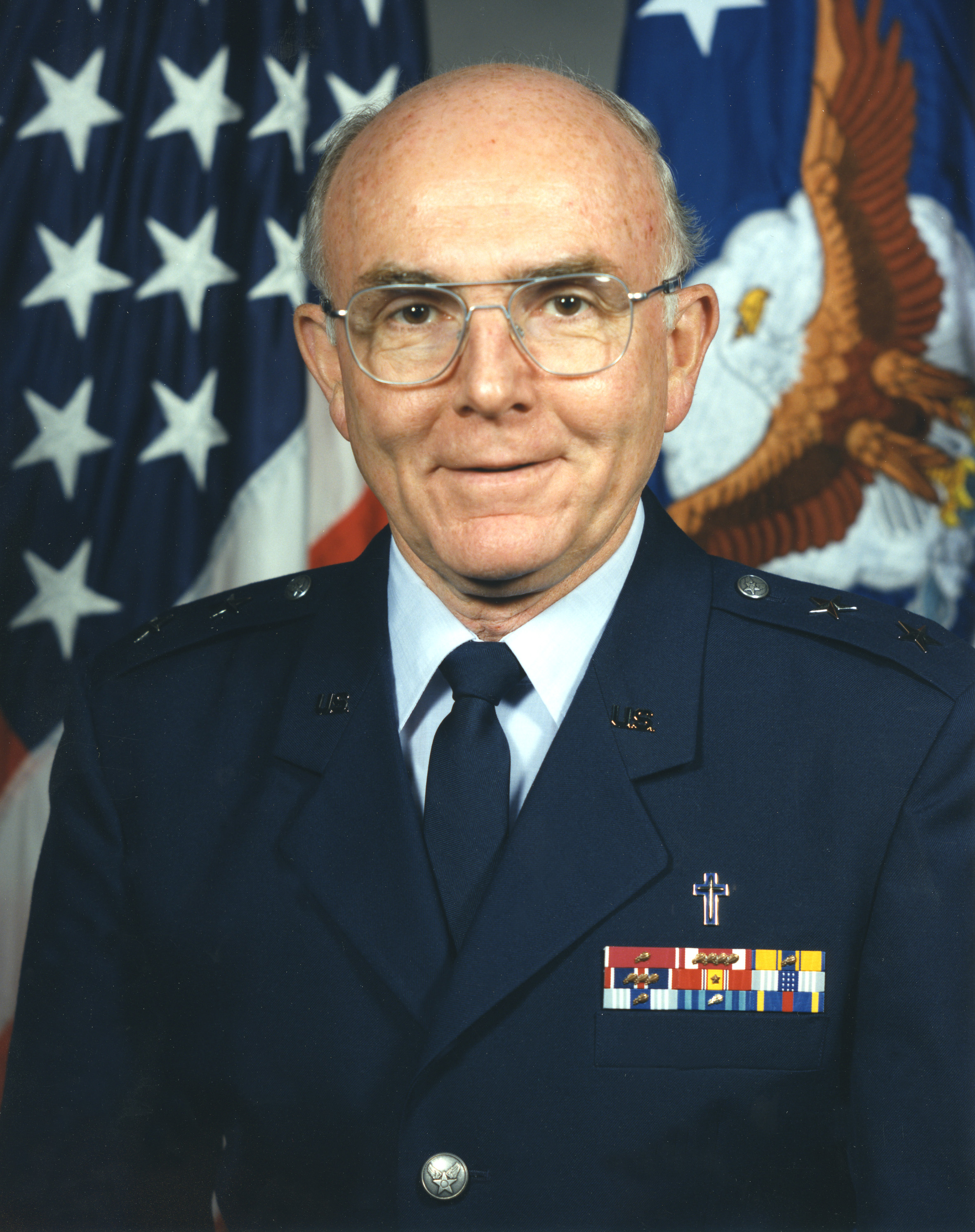
Bishop Dendinger (2010)

=== 1972 to present ===
After Paschang's retirement in 1972, John Joseph Sullivan of Omaha succeeded him. Sullivan served there until his appointment as bishop of the Diocese of Kansas City-Saint Joseph in 1977. Sullivan was replaced by Lawrence McNamara of Kansas City-St. Joseph in 1978.

When McNamara retired in 2004 after 26 years as bishop, William Dendinger, formerly the deputy chief of the United States Air Force Chaplain Corps, was the new bishop of Grand Island. Dendinger retired in 2014. The next year, Joseph G. Hanefeldt of Omaha took office.

=== Sex abuse ===
Mark Maresh, a priest from Immaculate Conception Parish in Elm Creek was arrested in June 2006 on charges of exposing himself to a woman and her two young children. He pleaded no contest to misdemeanor public indecency. Maresh was sentenced to 30 days in jail and 50 hours of community service. After receiving treatment at a church facility in Maryland, he was returned to ministry in 2008.

In November 2021, Nebraska Attorney General Doug Peterson released a list of Catholic priests in Nebraska with credible accusations of sexual abuse of minors. Three priests from the diocese appeared on the list.

== Bishops ==
=== Bishop of Kearney ===
1. James Albert Duffy: 1912 to 1917

=== Bishops of Grand Island ===
1. James Albert Duffy: 1917 to 1931
2. Stanislaus Vincent Bona: 1931 to 1944, appointed Coadjutor Bishop and later Bishop of Green Bay
3. Edward Joseph Hunkeler: 1945 to 1951, appointed Bishop and later Archbishop of Kansas City in Kansas
4. John Linus Paschang: 1951 to 1972
5. John J. Sullivan: 1972 to 1977, appointed Bishop of Kansas City–Saint Joseph
6. Lawrence James McNamara: 1978 to 2004)
7. William Joseph Dendinger: 2004 to 2015
8. Joseph G. Hanefeldt: 2015 to present

=== Titular Bishops of Kearney ===
1. Thomas Wenski: 1997 to 2003, while auxiliary bishop of the Archdiocese of Miami
2. Felipe de Jesús Estévez: 2003 to 2011, while auxiliary bishop of the Archdiocese of Miami
3. Robert Deeley: 2012 to 2013, while auxiliary bishop of the Archdiocese of Boston
4. Mario E. Dorsonville: 2015 to 2023, while auxiliary bishop of the Archdiocese of Washington
5. Brian Nunes: incumbent-elect, auxiliary bishop-elect of the Archdiocese of Los Angeles

=== Other diocesan priests who became bishops ===
- James R. Golka, appointed Bishop of Colorado Springs in 2021 and later Archbishop of Denver

== Catholic high schools ==
- Central Catholic High School – Grand Island
- Kearney Catholic High School – Kearney
- St. Patrick High School – North Platte
- Spalding Academy – Spalding

Coat of arms of Diocese of Grand Island
| Notes Arms was designed and adopted when the diocese was erected Adopted 1912 Escutcheon The diocesan arms consists of a gold cross against a green field, with a morning star and wavy border, both in silver. Symbolism The green and gold colors represent the plains and fields of western Nebraska. The cross symbolizes the crucifixion. The star is a traditional symbol of Mary, mother of Jesus, patroness of the diocese. The wavy border represents the Platte River. Crowning the shield is the mitre, worn by bishops. |

== Sources and external links ==
- Official website
- GigaCatholic, with incumbent biography links
