= Diocese of Kansas City–Saint Joseph =

Latin Catholic diocese in Missouri, United States

Coordinates: 39°05′25″N 94°35′01″W

Diocese of Kansas City–Saint Joseph Dioecesis Kansanopolitanae–Sancti Josephi
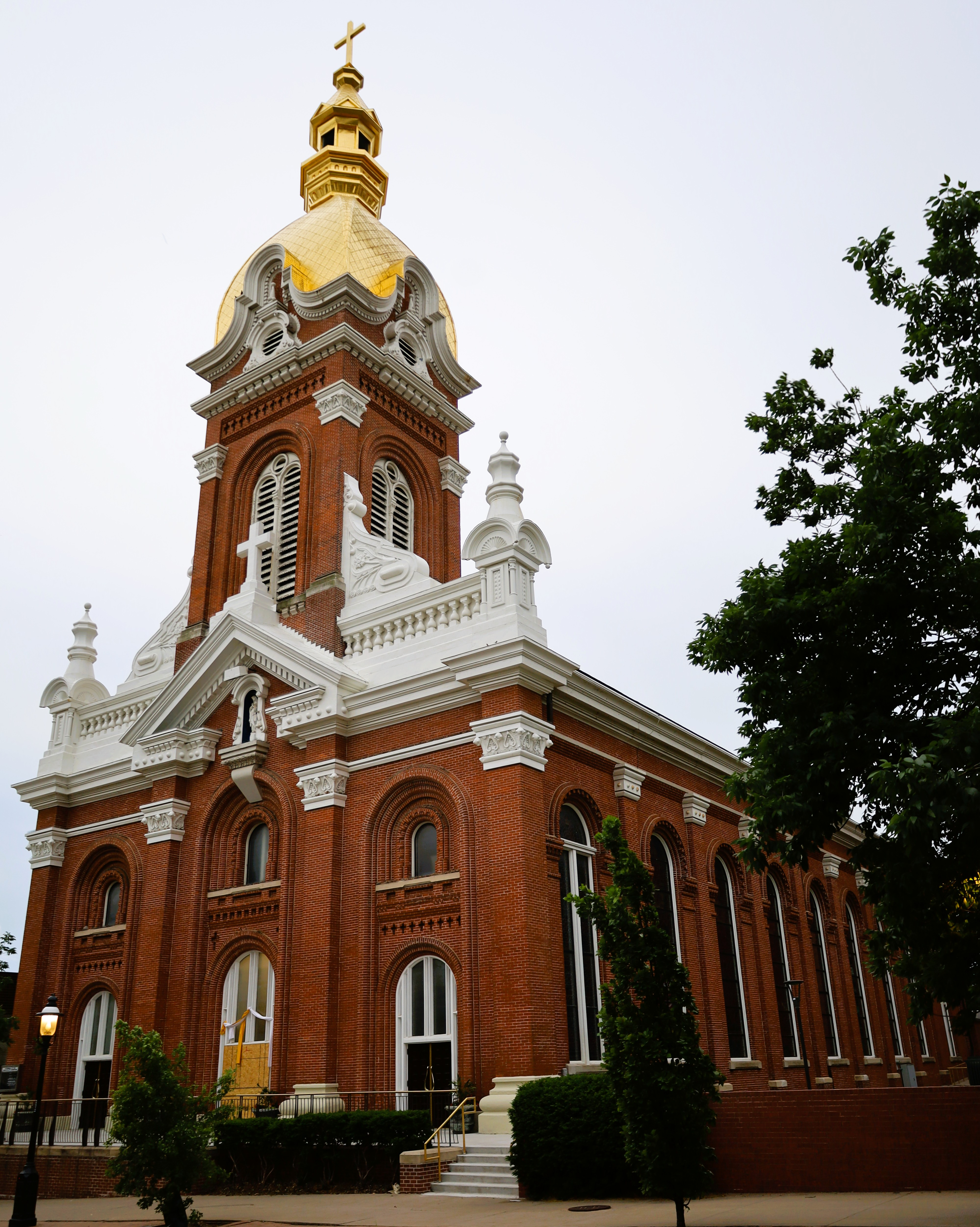
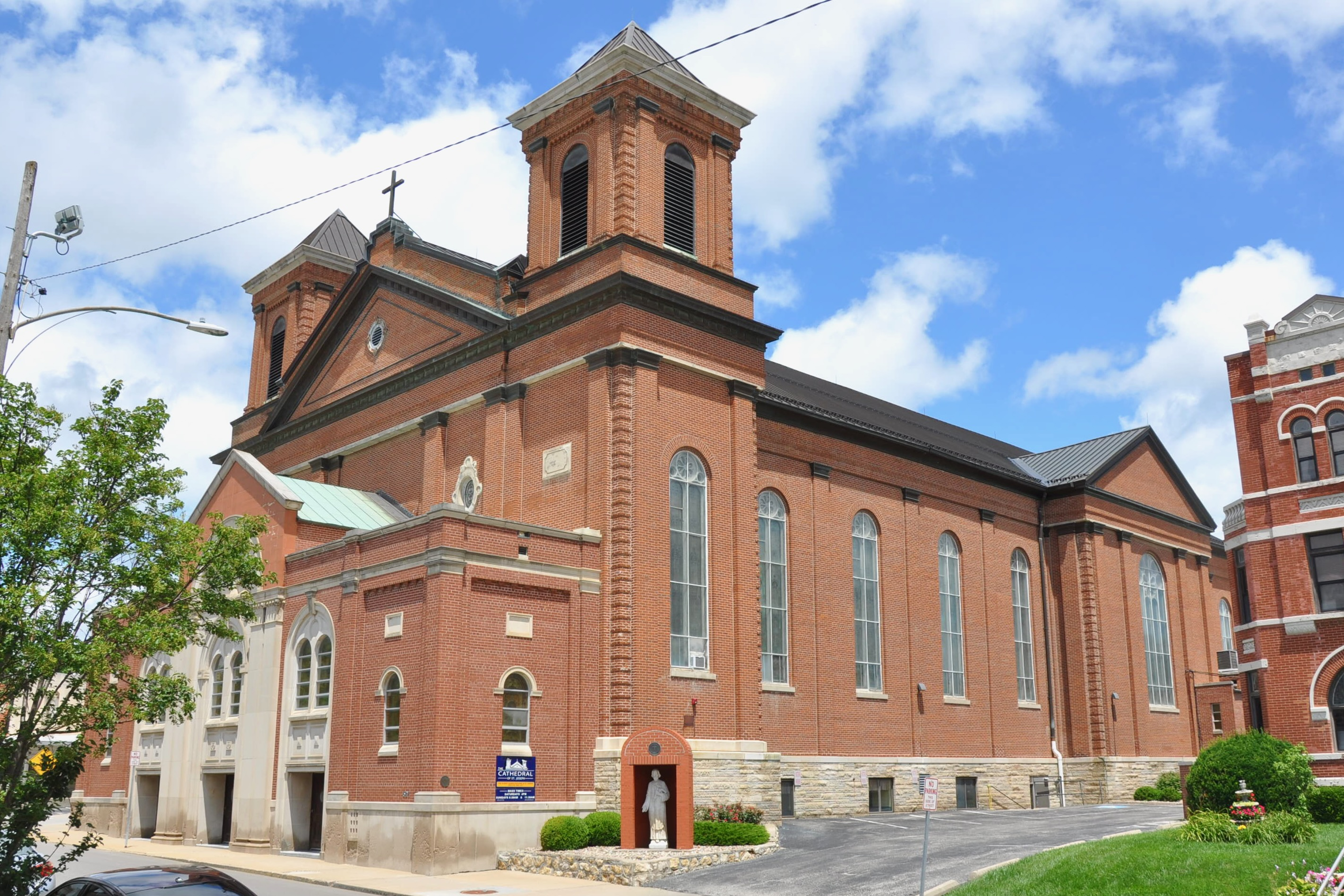
- Cathedral of the Immaculate Conception, Kansas City Cathedral of St. Joseph, St. Joseph

- Coat of arms

Location
- Country: United States
- Territory: 27 counties across Northern and Western Missouri
- Ecclesiastical province: St. Louis

Statistics
- Area: 15,429 km^{2} (5,957 sq mi)
- Population: Total; Catholics: (as of 2012); 1,513,005; 137,900 (9.1%)
- Parishes: 87

Information
- Denomination: Catholic
- Sui iuris church: Latin Church
- Rite: Roman Rite
- Established: September 10, 1880
- Cathedral: Cathedral of the Immaculate Conception (Kansas City)
- Co-cathedral: Cathedral of St. Joseph (St. Joseph)
- Patron saint: Our Lady of the Immaculate Conception, Saint Joseph (Primary); John Francis Regis (Secondary)

Current leadership
- Pope: Leo XIV
- Bishop: James Vann Johnston, Jr.
- Metropolitan Archbishop: Mitchell T. Rozanski
- Bishops emeritus: Robert Finn

Map
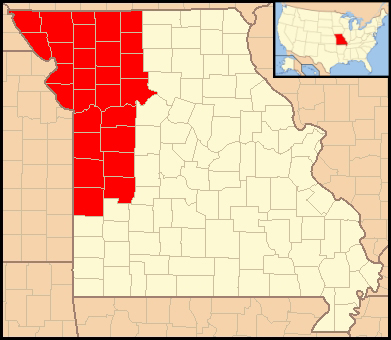

Website
- kcsjcatholic.org

The Diocese of Kansas City–Saint Joseph (Latin: Dioecesis Kansanopolitanae–Sancti Josephi) is a diocese of the Catholic Church in northwestern Missouri in the United States. It is a suffragan diocese of the metropolitan Archdiocese of Saint Louis. The see's mother church is the Cathedral of the Immaculate Conception in Kansas City. The bishop is James Vann Johnston, Jr.

== Territory ==
The Diocese of Kansas City-Saint Joseph encompasses the following counties:

Andrew, Atchison, Bates, Buchanan, Caldwell, Carroll, Cass, Clay, Clinton, Daviess, DeKalb, Gentry, Grundy, Harrison, Henry, Holt, Jackson, Johnson, Lafayette, Livingston, Mercer, Nodaway, Platte, Ray, St. Clair, Vernon and Worth.

== History ==
=== 1800 to 1880 ===
The first Catholic presence in Missouri was that of European explorers in the 17th century traveling the Mississippi River. In present-day Hannibal, Missouri, the first Catholic masses were celebrated by the Belgian missionary, Louis Hennepin, in 1680 at Bay de Charles. At that time, all of Missouri was part of the French colony of Louisiana. Up until the early 19th century, Catholics in this region were first under the French jurisdiction of the Diocese of Quebec, then Spanish jurisdiction under the Diocese of Louisiana and the Two Floridas.

The first Catholic chapel in Western Missouri was established at Chocteau's Bluff near present-day Kansas City, Missouri.

With the Louisiana Purchase of 1804, Missouri passed from France to the United States and the bishop of the Diocese of New Orleans assumed jurisdiction for Catholics in Missouri. In 1826, Pope Leo XII erected the Diocese of St. Louis, covering the new state of Missouri along with vast areas of the American Great Plains. The northwestern Missouri region would remain part of this diocese for the next 57 years.

The first parish in the present-day diocese was St. Mary's, founded in Independence in 1823 to serve French-Canadian families in the area. In the Kansas City area, the first Catholic church was dedicated in 1833. Immaculate Conception Church in Kansas City was completed in 1857.

=== 1880 to 1956 ===
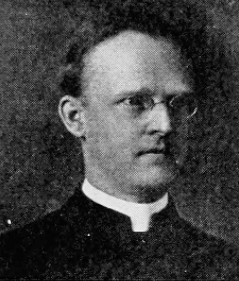
Bishop O'Hara (1918)

On September 10, 1880, Pope Leo XIII established the Diocese of Kansas City, with territories taken from the Archdiocese of St. Louis. The pope named Bishop John Joseph Hogan from the Diocese of St. Joseph as the first bishop of Kansas City. The Jesuit Order opened Rockhurst College in Kansas City in 1910. In 1919, Bishop Thomas Francis Lillis from the Diocese of Leavenworth was named by Pope Pius X as coadjutor bishop to assist Hogan.

When Hogan died in 1913 after 33 years as bishop, Lillis automatically succeeded him. Lillis delivered the invocation at the second session of the 1928 Republican National Convention in Kansas City. In 1933, Lillis drafted a resolution signed by many of his fellow Catholic bishops and 350 priests in an effort to end lynchings of African-Americans. Lillis died in 1938.

The next bishop of Kansas City was Bishop Edwin Vincent O'Hara of the Diocese of Great Falls, named by Pope Pius XII in 1939. Within his first ten years as bishop, O'Hara built or purchased 42 churches, 31 rectories, 24 colleges, high schools, and grade schools, 14 convents, eight social centers, and six hospitals. Of the 30 churches he constructed in rural areas, 25 were their first Catholic church in the county.

A proponent of Catholic Action, O'Hara encouraged lay involvement in the diocesan administration and appointed laypeople to several top diocesan positions. He obtained approval from the Vatican to use English in parts of the mass and the administration of sacraments.

In 1954, Pius XII named Auxiliary Bishop John Cody of St. Louis as coadjutor bishop in Kansas City-Saint Joseph to assist O'Hara. O'Hara in 1955 founded Queen of the World Hospital in Kansas City, the first racially integrated hospital in the diocese and then integrated the other Catholic medical centers.

=== 1956 to 1977 ===
In July 1956, Pius XII redrew the diocesan boundaries in parts of Missouri:

- The pope suppressed the Dioceses of Kansas City and Saint Joseph.
- He created the new Dioceses of Kansas City-Saint Joseph, Jefferson City and Springfield-Cape Girardeau.
- The Archdiocese of St. Louis was left unchanged.

After O'Hara died in September 1956, Cody automatically succeeded him as bishop. After a few years in the diocese, Cody in 1962 was named coadjutor archbishop of New Orleans.

The next bishop in Kansas City-Saint Joseph was Bishop Charles Herman Helmsing of Springfield-Cape Girardeau, selected by Pope John XXIII in 1962. In 1968, Helmsing condemned the National Catholic Reporter (NCR), based in Kansas City. He objected specifically to NCR's stands on artificial birth control and priestly celibacy, along with its criticism of the church hierarchy. Sixty-six Catholic journalists signed a petition supporting NCR. Helmsing retired in 1977.

=== 1977 to 2015 ===
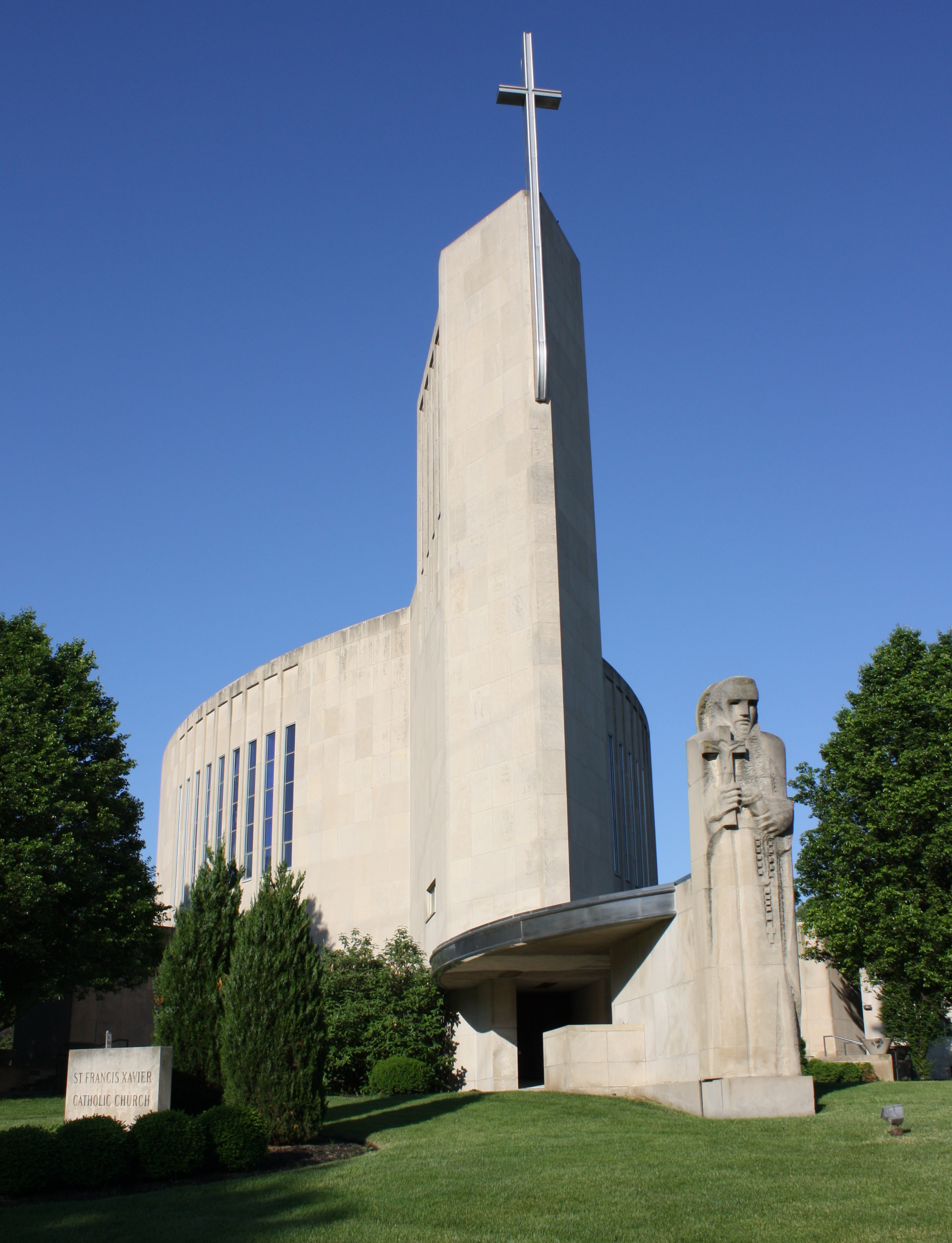
Rockhurst University, Kansas City, Missouri (2018)

Bishop John Sullivan of the Diocese of Grand Island was appointed bishop of Kansas City-Saint Joseph in 1977. After 16 years as bishop, Sullivan retired in 1993 due to a diagnosis of Parkinson's disease. Pope John Paul II then named Bishop Raymond Boland of the Diocese of Birmingham to replace Sullivan. In 2004, Robert Finn of St. Louis was named as coadjutor bishop. When Boland retired in 2005, Finn became the next bishop of Kansas City-Saint Joseph.

Upon becoming bishop, Finn said that vocations to the priesthood and religious life would be seen as a "super-priority" for his diocese. Before Finn's arrival, in 2003, the diocese reported having nine seminarians. By 2007, the diocese reported 24 men studying for diocesan priesthood.

In September 2014, Pope Francis ordered an investigation into Finn's tenure as bishop, to be conducted by Canadian Archbishop Terrence Prendergast. Cardinal Seán Patrick O'Malley, the leader of a church commission on child abuse cases, said in an interview that Finn's misdemeanor conviction for failure to report child abuse would have disqualified him from teaching Sunday school in the Archdiocese of Boston. "It's a question that the Holy See needs to address urgently," O'Malley said. In 2015, Finn resigned as bishop of Kansas City-Saint Joseph.

=== 2015 to present ===
The current bishop of the Diocese of Kansas City-St. Joseph is James Vann Johnston Jr.. He was appointed by Pope Francis in 2015.

== Sex abuse ==
=== 2000 to 2019 ===
In 2004, Bishop Emeritus Joseph Hubert Hart of the Diocese of Cheyenne was named in a civil lawsuit alleging that he sexually abused three minors while serving as a priest in the Diocese of Kansas City-Saint Joseph and in Cheyenne. Hart had allegedly been transferred to Cheyenne in the 1970s after sex abuse allegations surfaced against him in Missouri. In 2005, a fifth person alleged abuse by Hart in 1973 or 1974, when the man was a 12-year-old parishioner at St. John Francis Regis Parish. In 2008, the diocese made a $10 million settlement with the accusers. As part of the settlement, Bishop Finn agreed to report any future suspected abuse to law enforcement.

In June 2011, Finn appointed former U.S. Attorney Todd P. Graves to investigate diocesan policies and procedures on sexual misconduct by clergy. Finn also announced the appointment of an independent public liaison and ombudsman. In September 2011, Graves released his report, saying that "diocesan leaders failed to follow their own policies and procedures for responding to reports" of sexual abuse by clergy.

In October 2011, a grand jury indicted both the diocese and Finn for failing to report suspected child abuse, a criminal misdemeanor. The indictment charged Finn with failing to inform police about child pornography produced by Shawn Ratigan, a priest who was later laicized. Finn was convicted on one charge in September 2012 and sentenced to two years of probation. All charges against the diocese itself were dropped. Ratigan was convicted of producing child pornography in 2013 and was sentenced to 50 years in prison. In June 2014, the diocese was ordered by a court arbitrator to pay an additional $1 million to sexual abuse survivors because the diocese had broken the promise it made in the 2008 settlement when it failed to report Ratigan's suspected abuse.

=== 2019 to present ===
The diocese in 2019 released a list of 19 clergy with credible accusations of sexual abuse of minors. In August 2019, Benedict Neenan, abbot of Conception Abbey, released a list of eight monks who were credibly accused of committing acts of sex abuse while serving in the diocese. Neenan also issued an "unconditional apology to all victims and their families affected by the evil of clergy sexual abuse."

In March 2021, Bishop Johnston announced the laicization in December 2020 of Michael Tierney, a former diocesan priest. Tierney had faced multiple credible accusations of sexual abuse of children.

== Viewpoints ==
=== Abortion ===
In September 2020, just before the 2020 US presidential election, Johnston sent a controversial letter to parishioners in the diocese. In the letter, Johnston asked voters to examine which political party supported so-called moral issues such as abortion rights for women.

== Bishops ==
=== Bishops of Saint Joseph ===
See Diocese of Saint Joseph for a list of its bishops.

=== Bishops of Kansas City ===
1. John Joseph Hogan (1880–1913)
  - John J. Glennon (coadjutor bishop 1896–1903); appointed Coadjutor Archbishop of St. Louis before succession and subsequently succeeded to that see (elevated to Cardinal in 1946)
2. Thomas Francis Lillis (1913–1938)
3. Edwin Vincent O'Hara (1939–1956), elevated to Archbishop (ad personam) in 1954

=== Bishops of Kansas City–Saint Joseph ===
1. John Patrick Cody (1956–1961; coadjutor Bishop of Kansas City 1954–1956), appointed Coadjutor Archbishop of New Orleans, subsequently succeeding to that see, and later Archbishop of Chicago (elevated to Cardinal in 1967)
2. Charles Herman Helmsing (1962–1977)
3. John J. Sullivan (1977–1993)
4. Raymond James Boland (1993–2005)
5. Robert W. Finn (2005–2015; coadjutor bishop 2004–2005)
  - Joseph Fred Naumann, apostolic administrator (2015).
6. James Vann Johnston, Jr. (2015–present)

=== Auxiliary bishops ===
- Joseph M. Marling (1947–1956), appointed Bishop of Jefferson City
- Joseph Vincent Sullivan (1967–1974), appointed Bishop of Baton Rouge
- George Kinzie Fitzsimons (1975–1984), appointed Bishop of Salina

=== Other diocesan priests who became bishops ===
- Michael Francis McAuliffe, appointed Bishop of Jefferson City in 1969
- William Wakefield Baum, appointed Bishop of Springfield-Cape Girardeau in 1970 and later Archbishop of Washington, Prefect of the Congregation for Catholic Education, and Major Penitentiary of the Apostolic Penitentiary (created a Cardinal in 1976)
- Joseph Hubert Hart, appointed Auxiliary Bishop (in 1976) and later Bishop of Cheyenne in 1978
- Lawrence James McNamara, appointed Bishop of Grand Island in 1978

== Educational institutions ==
As of 2023, the Diocese of Kansas City-Saint Joseph has seven high schools and 24 elementary schools or pre-schools.

=== Current high schools ===
School	Location	Oversight	Opened
Bishop LeBlond High School	St. Joseph	Operated by the diocese	1960
Cristo Rey Kansas City High School	Kansas City	Cristo Rey Network and Sisters of Charity of Leavenworth	2006
Notre Dame de Sion School	Kansas City	Sisters of Notre Dame de Sion	1912
Rockhurst High School	Kansas City	Society of Jesus	1910
St. Michael the Archangel Catholic High School	Lee's Summit	Operated by the diocese	2017
St. Pius X Catholic High School	Kansas City	Operated by the diocese	1956
St. Teresa's Academy	Kansas City	Sisters of St. Joseph of Carondelet	1866

=== Closed high schools ===
School	Location	Opened	Closed
Archbishop O'Hara High School	Kansas City	1965	2017
Bishop Hogan High School	Kansas City	1935	1999
St. Mary's High School	Independence	1853	2013

=== College ===
School	Location	Oversight	Opened
Avila University	Kansas City	Sisters of St. Joseph of Carondelet	1916
Rockhurst University	Kansas City	Society of Jesus	1910
