= Spalding Academy =

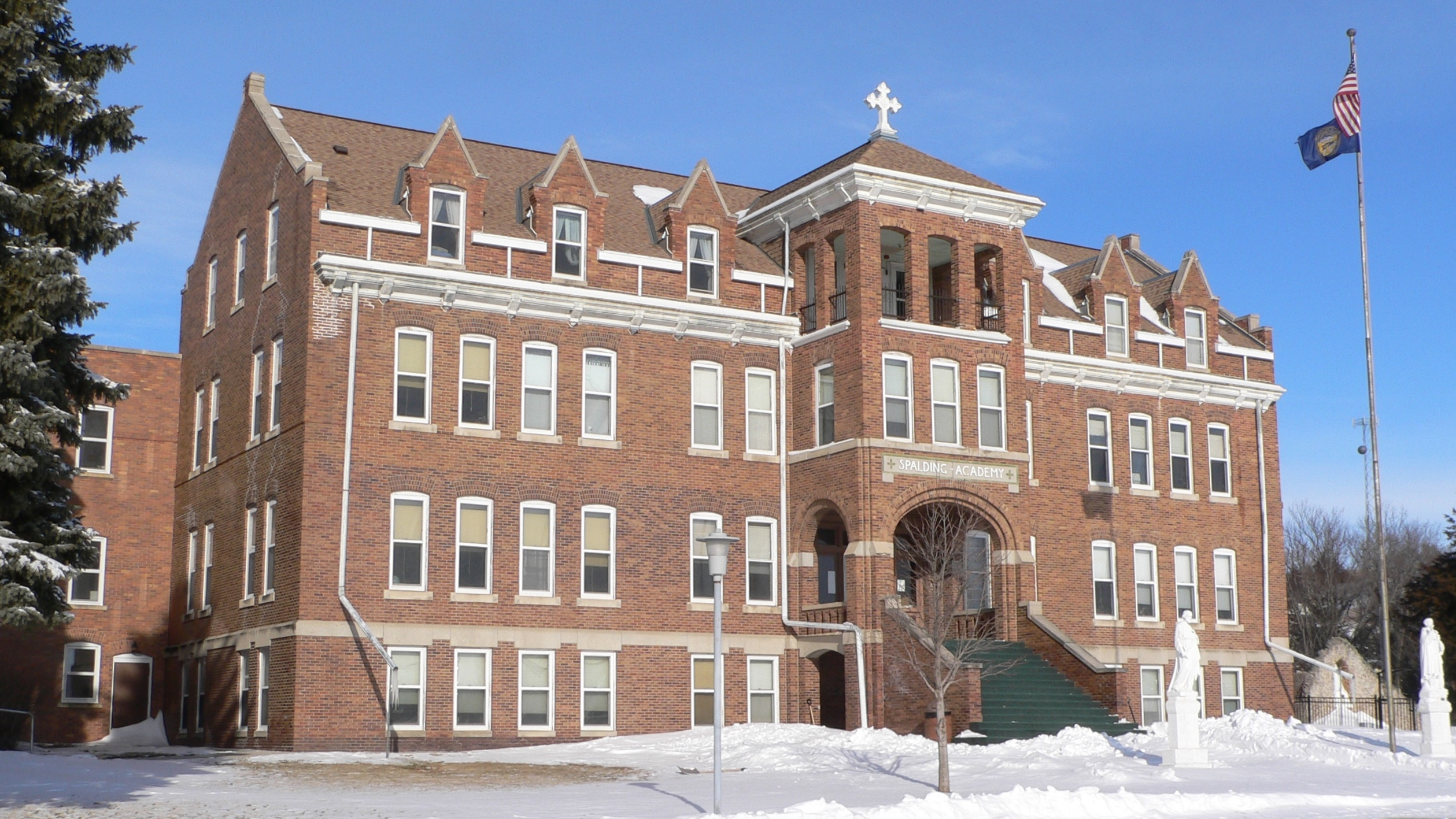

Location
- 130 West Marguerite; Spalding, Nebraska; United States; 41°41′25″N 98°21′49″W

Information
- Type: Private, coeducational
- Religious affiliations: Roman Catholic; Dominican Sisters
- Established: 1891
- Grades: K–12
- Website: School website

Spalding Academy School is a private Roman Catholic high school in Spalding, Nebraska, United States. It is located in the Roman Catholic Diocese of Grand Island.

== Background ==
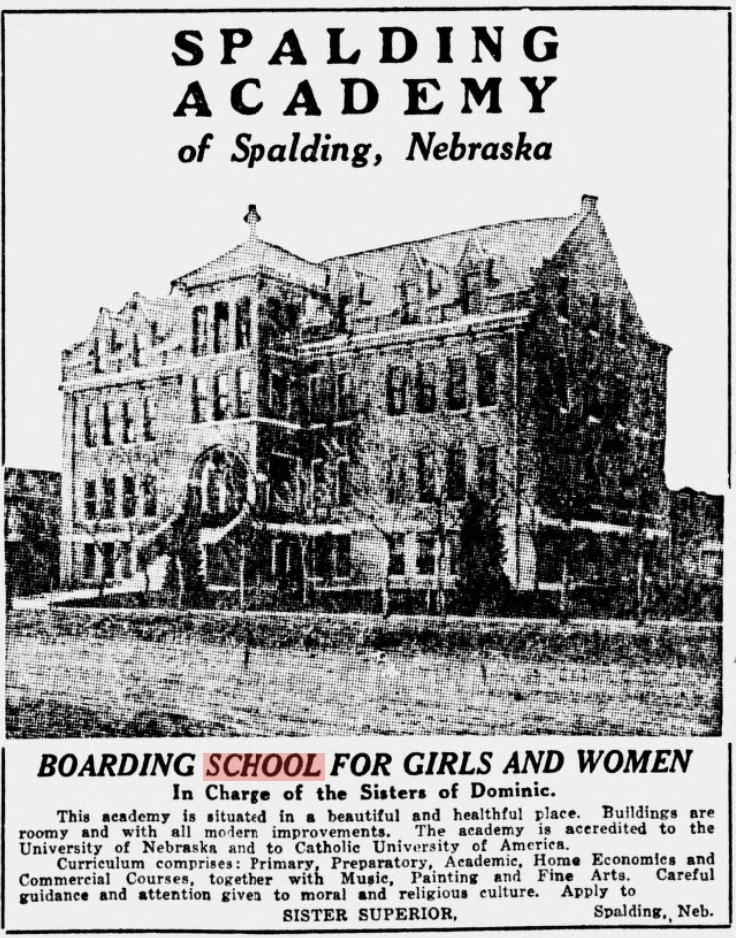
A 1919 advertisement for Spalding Academy placed in The Omaha Daily Bee.

Spalding Academy was founded in 1891, and added high school classes by 1905.

== Athletics ==
Spalding Academy is a member of the Nebraska School Activities Association. Their teams won the Nebraska state eight-man football championship in 1979, and the six-man football championship in 1993.
