= Edward Joseph Hunkeler =

American prelate (1894–1970)

His Excellency, The Most Reverend Edward Joseph Hunkeler
- Archbishop of Kansas City
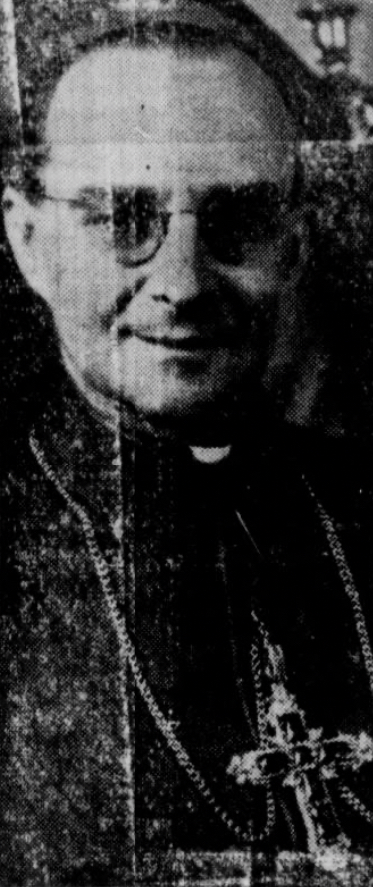
- Hunkeler in a 1946 publication
- In office: 1951–1969
- Predecessor: George Joseph Donnelly
- Successor: Ignatius Jerome Strecker

Orders
- Ordination: June 14, 1919 by James Joseph Hartley
- Consecration: May 1, 1946 by Amleto Giovanni Cicognani

Personal details
- Born: January 1, 1894 Medicine Lodge, Kansas, US
- Died: October 1, 1970 (aged 76) Crookston, Minnesota, US
- Denomination: Roman Catholic
- Parents: Anton and Philomena (née Durst) Hunkeler
- Education: University of Dayton; Pontifical College Josephinum
- Motto: Ut Christum diligant (That they may love Christ)

Edward Joseph Hunkeler (January 1, 1894 – October 1, 1970) was an American prelate of the Roman Catholic Church who served as bishop of the Diocese of Grand Island in Nebraska (1945–1951), and bishop and archbishop of the Archdiocese of Kansas City in Kansas (1951–1969).

== Biography ==
=== Early life ===
Edward Hunkeler was born on January 1, 1894, in Medicine Lodge, Kansas, to Anton and Philomena (née Durst) Hunkeler. He and his parents later moved to Dayton, Ohio, where he attended the parochial school of Holy Trinity Parish. He later enrolled at the University of Dayton. Hunkeler completed his studies for the priesthood at the Pontifical College Josephinum in Worthington, Ohio.

=== Priesthood ===
Hunkeler was ordained to the priesthood at the Josephinum by Bishop James Hartley on June 14, 1919, for the Diocese of Omaha. After his ordination, the diocese assigned Hunkeler as pastor of Saints Philip and James Parish in Wynot, Nebraska He was transferred in 1927 to he was transferred to Blessed Sacrament Parish in Omaha, Nebraska. In 1936, Hunkeler was appointed rector of St. Cecilia Cathedral in Omaha. He was named a domestic prelate by Pope Pius XI in 1937, and became vicar general of the diocese in 1944.

=== Bishop of Grand Island ===
On March 19, 1945, Hunkeler was appointed the third bishop of Grand Island by Pope Pius XII. He received his episcopal consecration on May 1, 1945, from Archbishop Amleto Cicognani, with Bishops James Ryan and Stanislaus Bona serving as co-consecrators, at St. Cecilia Cathedral. During his tenure in Grand Island, Hunkeler ordained 16 priests, and oversaw a large increase in the construction of new churches and other religious institutions in the post-World War II era.

=== Bishop and Archbishop of Kansas City ===
Hunkeler was named bishop of Kansas City by Pius XII on March 28, 1951. When the Diocese of Kansas City was elevated to the rank of an archdiocese on August 9, 1952, Hunkeler became its first archbishop. During the early 1960s, Hunkeler attended all four sessions in Rome of the Second Vatican Council.

=== Retirement and legacy ===
On September 10, 1969, Pope Paul VI accepted Hunkeler's resignation as archbishop due to health problems. In 1970, while returning from the installation of Bishop Kenneth Povish, Hunkeler's car was involved in an automobile accident near Crookston, Minnesota. Edward Hunkeler died two days later, on October 1, aged 76; his death was ascribed to a cardiovascular respiratory condition rather than to injuries sustained in the accident.

Catholic Church titles
Preceded by George Joseph Donnelly	Bishop and Archbishop of Kansas City; 1951–1969	Succeeded by Ignatius Jerome Strecker
Preceded by Stanislaus Vincent Bona	Bishop of Grand Island; 1945–1951	Succeeded by John Linus Paschang
