= James Albert Duffy =

American prelate

His Excellency, The Right Reverend James Albert Duffy
- Bishop of Grand Island; Titular bishop of Silandus
- See: Diocese of Grand Island
- Installed: April 13, 1913
- Term ended: June 5, 1931
- Successor: Stanislaus Vincent Bona

Orders
- Ordination: May 27, 1899 by John Ireland
- Consecration: April 13, 1913 by James J. Keane

Personal details
- Born: September 13, 1873 St. Paul, Minnesota, US
- Died: February 12, 1968 (aged 94) Hot Springs, Arkansas, US
- Buried: Calvary Cemetery, Grand Island, Nebraska, US
- Denomination: Roman Catholic
- Parents: James J. Duffy; Johanna Shiely
- Education: Saint Paul Seminary School of Divinity
- Motto: Soli Deo gloria (To God alone be the glory)

James Albert Duffy (September 13, 1873 – February 12, 1968) was an American prelate of the Roman Catholic Church who served as the first bishop of the Diocese of Grand Island in Nebraska from 1917 to 1931. He previously served as bishop of the Diocese of Kearney in Nebraska from 1913 until its dissolution in 1917.

== Biography ==
=== Early life ===
James Duffy was born on September 13, 1873, in St. Paul, Minnesota, the third child of James J. Duffy and Johanna Shiely. When the death of the parents in 1879 orphaned the eight Duffy children, James Albert Duffy went to live at the Boys Orphan Asylum in Minneapolis. From 1887 to 1893, he was a student at the University of St. Thomas in St. Paul and subsequently attended Saint Paul Seminary School of Divinity in St. Paul from 1894 to 1899.

=== Priesthood ===
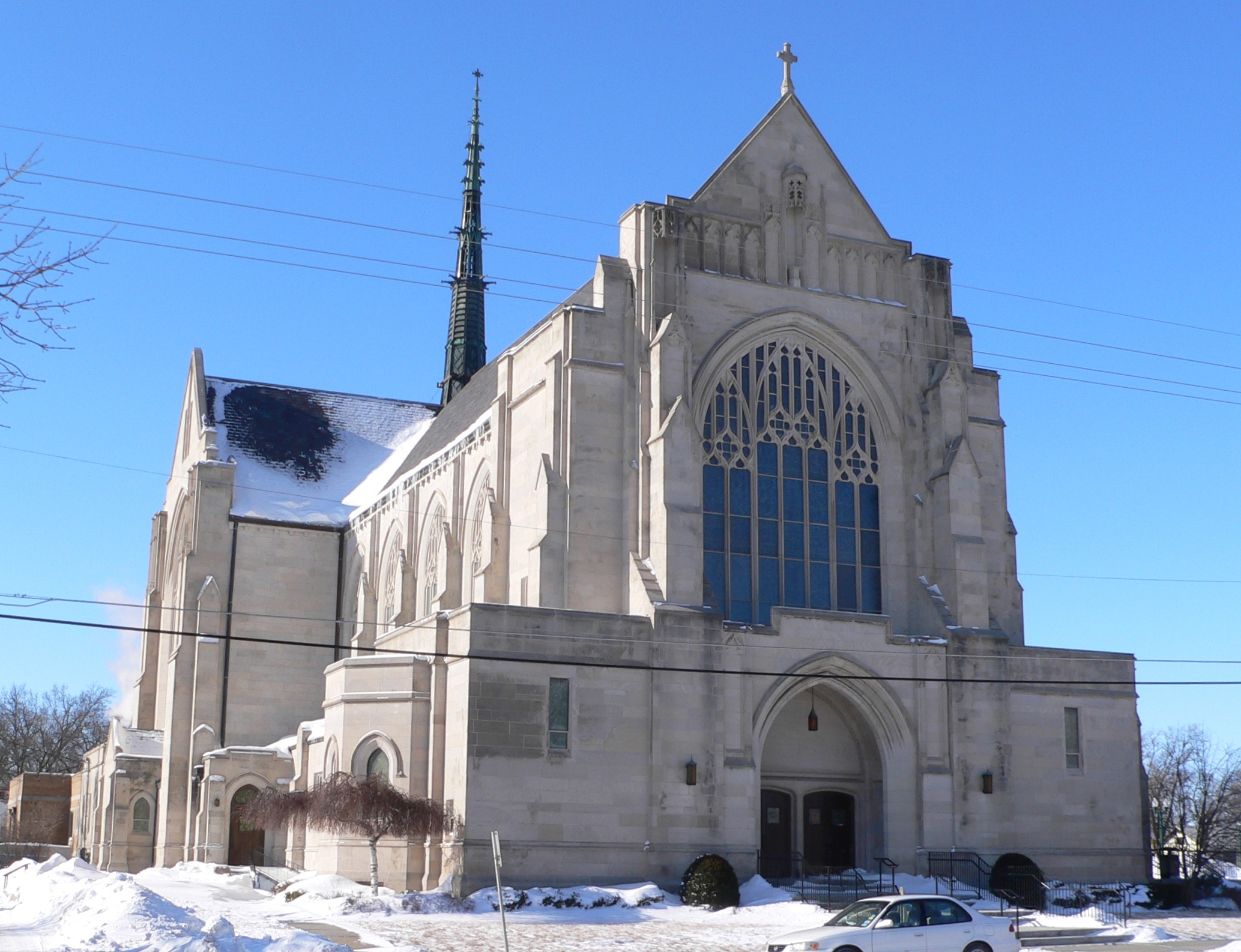
Cathedral of the Nativity of the Blessed Virgin Mary, Grand Island, Nebraska (2010)

Duffy was ordained into the priesthood on May 27, 1899, for the Archdiocese of St. Paul in St. Paul by Archbishop John Ireland. Following his ordination, the archdiocese assigned Duffy as an assistant pastor at Immaculate Conception Parish in Minneapolis. He was transferred in 1902 to St. Anne's Parish in Le Sueur, Minnesota.

Bishop James J. Keane in 1904 recruited Duffy to come to Wyoming to serve as rector at the St. Mary's Cathedral in Cheyenne. Duffy subsequently authored the article on the Diocese of Cheyenne for the Catholic Encyclopedia.

=== Bishop of Kearney ===
On January 27, 1913, Pope Pius X appointed Duffy as the first bishop of Kearney. Duffy was consecrated by Keane at St. Mary Cathedral in Cheyenne on April 13, 1913.

=== Bishop of Grand Island ===
On April 11, 1917, the Diocese of Kearney was renamed the Diocese of Grand Island by Pope Benedict XVI. Duffy oversaw construction of the Cathedral of the Nativity of the Blessed Virgin Mary in Grand Island, Nebraska, from 1926 to 1928. He also established the Nebraska Register.

=== Retirement and legacy ===
On June 5, 1931, Pope Pius XI accepted Duffy's early retirement as bishop of Grand Island due to poor health and appointed him as titular bishop of Silandus.

Duffy died on February 12, 1968, at St. Joseph's Infirmary in Hot Springs, Arkansas. He was buried in Calvary Cemetery in Grand Island. At the time of his death, Duffy was the most senior bishop in the United States in both age and years of consecration.

Catholic Church titles
Preceded by None (diocese erected)	Bishop of Grand Island (was Diocese of Kearney); 1913–1931	Succeeded by Stanislaus Vincent Bona
