= St. Patrick High School (North Platte, Nebraska) =

Location
- 500 South Silber; North Platte, Nebraska; United States; 41°7′45″N 100°45′18″W

Information
- Type: Private, coeducational
- Religious affiliation: Roman Catholic
- Superintendent: Kevin Dodson
- Principal: Deacon Matt Irish
- Faculty: 39
- Grades: 7–12
- Colors: Green, gold, and white
- Slogan: "Be The Best"
- Team name: Fighting Irish
- Website: http://npcschools.org/

St. Patrick High School is a Roman Catholic high school in the city of North Platte, in the state of Nebraska in the Midwestern United States. It is located in the Roman Catholic Diocese of Grand Island. St. Patrick High School is part of North Platte Catholic Schools, which also includes McDaid Elementary and Little Leprechaun Pre-School.

== History ==
Nativity Convent School (St. Patrick) was established on September 8, 1891. Among the first students was Irma Cody, daughter of William F. Cody. Five young women were the first graduates in 1895.

In 1916, St. Patrick School was constructed at Fourth and Walnut Streets, at an expense of $52,000. The building was described as the "finest educational structure in the area."

The current St. Patrick High School building was opened in 1955 near E and Silber Streets. The former building continued to serve as the elementary school. In 1967, it was renamed McDaid Elementary, in honor of Father Patrick McDaid, the pastor of the parish from 1910 to 1948.

Increasing enrollment in the late 1950s and 1960s necessitated expansion of the facilities, which took place in 1963 and 1967. During that time, the junior high program was established at the high school building.

In 1968, Bill McGahan was appointed principal of McDaid Elementary. He became the first lay school administrator in the Diocese of Grand Island. In 1970, he was named principal of both the elementary and high school. He became superintendent in 1974, and retired in July 2011. He was succeeded as superintendent by former teacher and coach Kevin Dodson.

== Athletics ==
St. Patrick's first football team was organized in 1939, under former University of Nebraska All-Star Leo Scherer. The school has been a member of the South Platte Valley Association athletic conference since 1969.

Athletic facilities for St. Patrick High School include two gymnasiums, a football field, a weight room, and a practice field. Varsity basketball and volleyball hold their practices and games in the McGahan Activities Center at McDaid Elementary. Wrestling practice is held in the weight room, also at McDaid. Wrestling meets are held in the McGahan Activities Center. The gymnasium at St. Patrick High School was previously the only gym, until McGahan Activities Center was opened in 2000. Currently, the St. Patrick gym is mainly used for junior high activities. The football team plays all home games at Knights of Columbus Field. Football practices are held at the practice field east of McDaid. Home track meets are held at North Platte High School. The golf team holds their activities at courses in North Platte.

St. Patrick won its first state championship, in boys' basketball, in 1928. Since then, it has won state football championships in 1948, 1984, 1985, and 2004; wrestling championships in 1976 and 1981; golf championships in 2002, 2010, and 2021; and a basketball championship in 2022.

== St. Patrick's today ==
The entire North Platte Catholic Schools system (K–12) has an operating budget of around $2 million. Enrollment is about 420, making up approximately 11% of school-aged children in North Platte. North Platte Catholic Schools has a professional staff of 39 and a service staff of 15. The school has had over 2,200 graduates.

== Notable alumni ==
- Bill Hayes, former MLB player (Chicago Cubs)
- Joseph A. Krzycki ('74), discovered the 22nd amino acid, pyrrolysine
