= Ignatius Jerome Strecker =

American prelate

His Excellency, The Most Reverend Ignatius Jerome Strecker
- Archbishop of Kansas City
- Church: Roman Catholic Church
- See: Archdiocese of Kansas City
- Predecessor: Edward Joseph Hunkeler
- Successor: James Patrick Keleher
- Previous post: Bishop of Springfield-Cape Girardeau (1962 to 1969)

Orders
- Ordination: December 19, 1942 by Christian Winkelmann
- Consecration: June 20, 1962 by Edward Hunkeler

Personal details
- Born: November 23, 1917 Spearville, Kansas, US
- Died: October 16, 2003 (aged 85) Kansas City, Kansas, US
- Education: St. Benedict's College; Catholic University of America
- Motto: Sanctificetur nomen tuum (Hallowed be Thy name)

Styles of Ignatius Strecker
- Reference style: The Most Reverend
- Spoken style: Your Excellency
- Religious style: Monsignor
- Posthumous style: none

Ignatius Jerome Strecker (November 23, 1917 – October 16, 2003) was an American prelate of the Roman Catholic Church. He served as archbishop of the Archdiocese of Kansas City in Kansas from 1969 to 1993. He previously served as bishop of the Diocese of Springfield-Cape Girardeau in Missouri from 1962 to 1969.

== Biography ==
=== Early life ===
Ignatius Strecker was born on November 23, 1917, in Spearville, Kansas, to William and Mary (Knoeber) Strecker. He was baptized at St. John the Baptist Church in Spearville, where his parents were also the first couple to be married. He had a brother, Henry; and five sisters, Agnes, Catherine, Mary, Elizabeth, and Wilhelmina.

Strecker attended Maur Hill Prep School and Benedictine College, both in Atchison, Kansas. He then went to Kenrick Seminary in St. Louis, Missouri.

=== Priesthood ===
Strecker was ordained to the priesthood at Saint John's Chapel in Wichita, Kansas, for the Diocese of Wichita by Bishop Christian Winkelmann on December 19, 1942. Strecker celebrated his first Mass in Spearville two days later. He then studied canon law at the Catholic University of America in Washington D.C. Strecker was appointed chancellor of the diocese in 1948.

=== Bishop of Springfield-Cape Girardeau ===
On April 7, 1962, Strecker was appointed the second bishop of Springfield-Cape Girardeau by Pope John XXIII. He received his episcopal consecration on June 20, 1962, from Archbishop Edward Hunkeler, with Bishops Charles Helmsing and Marion Forst serving as co-consecrators, in the Cathedral of the Immaculate Conception in Wichita. From 1962 to 1965, Strecker attended the Second Vatican Council in Rome.

=== Archbishop of Kansas City ===
Pope Paul VI named Strecker as the second archbishop of Kansas City on September 4, 1969. At age 51, Strecker was the second youngest prelate of that rank in the United States. He was elected president of the National Catholic Rural Life Conference twice.

Widely known as an advocate for small family farms, as well as the poor in the inner city and Hispanics, Strecker urged the United States Congress to work toward a comprehensive food and agricultural policy. He testified before the House Agriculture Committee in 1984, during hearings in preparation for comprehensive farm policy legislation, and stated,

"The fate of our family farmers is not an abstract concern...what happens to them will determine whether or not a land-owning elite will increasingly control our food and the price of that food."

In 1990, Strecker established background and reference checks for all persons working with children, including employees and volunteers, at the archdiocese as part of a policy to combat sexual abuse of minors.In 1992, Strecker denounced the pro-choice views of Kansas State Representative Kathleen Sebelius. He accused Sebelius, a Catholic, of leading "the death-march of the unborn to the abortion clinics in the House of Representatives" and "attempting to make the 'death-marches' to the abortion clinics as legal as the death-marches to the gas chambers of the World War II Holocaust."

=== Retirement and legacy ===
After reaching the mandatory retirement age of 75, Strecker resigned his post as archbishop of Kansas City on June 28, 1993, following 23 years of service. During that time, he earned the nickname of "Gracious Ignatius".

After a series of strokes and a fall, Ignatius Strecker died in Kansas City, Kansas, on October 16, 2003, at age 85.

Catholic Church titles
Preceded by Charles Herman Helmsing	Bishop of Springfield-Cape Girardeau; 1962–1969	Succeeded by William Wakefield Baum
Preceded by Edward Joseph Hunkeler	Archbishop of Kansas City in Kansas; 1969–1993	Succeeded by James Patrick Keleher
