= John Linus Paschang =

Catholic bishop (1895–1999)

His Excellency, The Most Reverend John Linus Paschang
- Bishop of Grand Island
- See: Diocese of Grand Island
- In office: 1951–1972
- Predecessor: Edward Joseph Hunkeler
- Successor: John Joseph Sullivan

Orders
- Ordination: June 12, 1921 by Joseph Francis Busch
- Consecration: October 9, 1952 by Gerald Thomas Bergan

Personal details
- Born: October 5, 1895 Hemingford, Nebraska, US
- Died: March 25, 1999 (aged 103) West Point, Nebraska, US
- Denomination: Roman Catholic
- Parents: Casper and Gertrude (née Fisher) Paschang
- Education: Conception Seminary College; St. John's Seminary; Catholic University of America
- Motto: Misereor super turbam (I have compassion for the multitude)

John Linus Paschang (October 5, 1895 – March 21, 1999) was an American prelate of the Roman Catholic Church who served as bishop of the Diocese of Grand Island in Nebraska from 1951 to 1972.

== Biography ==
=== Early life ===
One of nine children, John Paschang was born on October 5, 1895, in Hemingford, Nebraska, to Casper and Gertrude (née Fisher) Paschang. Drawn to the religious life from high school, he studied at Conception Seminary College in Conception, Missouri, and at St. John's Seminary in Collegeville, Minnesota.

=== Priesthood ===
Paschang was ordained to the priesthood at St. John's by Bishop Joseph Francis Busch for the Diocese of Omaha on June 12, 1921. After his ordination, the diocese assigned Paschang as pastor of St. Rose of Lima Parish in Hooper, Nebraska. He went in 1923 to the Catholic University of America in Washington, D.C., where he earned a doctorate in canon law. Paschang then served as pastor of Holy Cross Parish in Omaha, Nebraska, from 1927 to 1951.

=== Bishop of Grand Island ===
On July 28, 1951, Paschang was appointed the fourth bishop of Grand Island by Pope Pius XII. He received his episcopal consecration at Saint Cecilia Cathedral in Omaha on October 9, 1951, from Archbishop Gerald Bergan, with Bishops Louis Kucera and Edward Hunkeler serving as co-consecrators.

During his tenure, Paschang ordained 55 priests and established 33 churches, 15 parish houses, 13 schools, 11 parish centers,six convents, several rectories, and four hospital additions. He attended all four sessions of the Second Vatican Council in Rome (1962–1965), but was privately opposed to some of the council's more liberal reforms. He also earned a stockbroker's license to better his knowledge of financial investments for the church.

=== Retirement and legacy ===
On July 25, 1972, Pope Paul VI accepted Paschang's resignation as bishop of Grand Island. Paschang founded the Damian Leper Relief Society in 1976. He moved to St. Joseph's Retirement Home in West Point, Nebraska, in 1993. He celebrated mass every day in his room until he was hospitalized at St. Francis Memorial Hospital in 1999. At the time of his death in West Point, on March 21, 1999, at age 103, John Paschang was the world's oldest living Catholic bishop.

Catholic Church titles
| Preceded by Edward Joseph Hunkeler | Bishop of Grand Island; 1951–1972 | Succeeded by John Joseph Sullivan |
