= Charles Herman Helmsing =

American prelate (1908–1993)

His Excellency, The Most Reverend Charles Herman Helmsing
- Diocese of Kansas City–St. Joseph; Titular Bishop of Axomis
- See: Diocese of Kansas City–St. Joseph
- Appointed: January 31, 1962
- Installed: April 3, 1962
- Term ended: June 27, 1977.
- Predecessor: John Patrick Cody
- Successor: John Joseph Sullivan
- Previous posts: Auxiliary Bishop of Saint Louis (1949 to 1956); Bishop of Springfield-Cape Girardeau (1956 to 1962)

Orders
- Ordination: June 10, 1933 by John Joseph Glennon
- Consecration: April 19, 1949 by Joseph Ritter

Personal details
- Born: March 23, 1908 Shrewsbury, Missouri, US
- Died: December 20, 1993 (aged 85) Kansas City, Missouri, US
- Denomination: Roman Catholic
- Parents: George and Louisa Helmsing
- Education: St. Louis Preparatory Seminary; Kenrick-Glennon Seminary
- Motto: Servus tuus, filius anciliae (I am thy slave, the son of thy handmaid)

Charles Herman Helmsing (March 23, 1908 – December 20, 1993) was an American prelate of the Roman Catholic Church who served as bishop of the Diocese of Kansas City–St. Joseph in Missouri (1962–1977).

Helmsing previously served as bishop of the Diocese of Springfield-Cape Girardeau in Missouri from 1956 to 1962 and as an auxiliary bishop of the Archdiocese of Saint Louis in Missouri from 1949 to 1956.

== Biography ==
=== Early life ===
Charles Helmsing was born on March 23, 1908, in Shrewsbury, Missouri, to George and Louisa Helmsing. He entered St. Louis Preparatory Seminary and then went on to Kenrick-Glennon Seminary, both In St. Louis, Missouri.

==== Priesthood ====
Helmsing was ordained a priest by Archbishop John Joseph Glennon for the Archdiocese of St. Louis on June 10, 1933 in St Louis. The Vatican elevated Helmsing to the rank of papal chamberlain on February 15, 1946.

=== Auxiliary Bishop of Saint Louis ===
Pope Pius XII appointed Helmsing as an auxiliary bishop of Saint Louis and titular bishop of Axomis on March 17, 1949. On April 19, 1949, Helmsing was consecrated by Cardinal Joseph Ritter at the Cathedral of Saint Louis in St. Louis..

Helmsing took a marked interest in the propagation of the faith, the instruction of converts, the work of the Legion of Mary, as well as both foreign and home missions. He worked as secretary and master of ceremonies for Ritter and took on a number of other positions, including director of the diocesan Society for the Propagation of the Faith.

=== Bishop of Springfield-Cape Girardeau ===
On August 24, 1956, when Pius XII divided Missouri into four dioceses, he appointed Helmsing as the first bishop of the new Diocese of Springfield–Cape Girardeau. He was installed as bishop there on November 28, 1956.

=== Bishop of Kansas City-Saint Joseph ===
Pope John XXIII appointed Helmsing as bishop of Kansas City – St. Joseph on January 31, 1962. In his installation homily on April 3, 1962, Helmsing explained his motto:

"In the sacrifice of the Cross, Christ our Lord identified Himself with the Old Testament servant of Yahweh, the slave of Almighty God, foretold by the prophets. It was this realization that impelled me to take as the motto of my life and work as a Bishop, the inspired words of the 115th Psalm, Servus tuus, filius anciliae (“O Lord, I am Thy slave and the son of Thy handmaid”).

It is in this spirit that I come to you with humble determination aided by our Lord’s grace to imitate Him as the slave of the Lord Who became obedient unto death, even the death of the Cross; and also in imitation of His Mother, Mary, who when the greatest possible task was given to her of mothering the Son of God, referred to herself “Behold the slave-girl of the Lord”.

Helmsing attended the Second Vatican Council in Rome during the 1960s with future Cardinal William Wakefield Baum as a peritus (expert). During the initial debate on the schema for liturgy (De Sacra Liturgia), a note is made of Helmsing's intervention on point no. 39 on the importance of the homily in the liturgy. Mathijis Lamberigts notes that Helmsing argued that the homily ought to be systematic and theologically well founded. He was most influential in the composition of the Decree on Ecumenism (Unitatis Redintegratio).

Helmsing returned to Kansas City, where he supported civil rights and brought home the documents of the Second Vatican Council and was responsible for implementing them in the diocese.

In November 1963, Helmsing was elected to the Vatican Secretariat for Christian Unity, which worked under Cardinal Bea to collect statements to the secretariat concerning the schema. The result was 1,063 pages published in six volumes. This helped to prepare revisions to the schema which were returned to council fathers.

In 1968, Helmsing condemned National Catholic Reporter (NCR) for what he termed as "...their policy of crusading against the Church's teachings". When the paper was founded, he provided diocesan office space and funds until the paper was able to move to the building where it continues to this day. In the late 1960s, Helmsing objected most specifically to the paper's strong stands against the Church's magisterium on artificial birth control, priestly celibacy, as well as its criticism of the hierarchy, citing an imbalance by the Reporter in its news coverage. Sixty-six Catholic journalists signed a petition supporting NCR.

=== Retirement and legacy ===
On June 27, 1977, Pope Paul VI accepted Helmsing's resignation as bishop of Kansas City–St. Joseph. Charles Helmsing died in Kansas City, Missouri, on December 20, 1993, aged 85.

In 2006, Bishop Robert W. Finn named a new adult faith formation initiative in the Diocese of Kansas City-Saint Joseph after Helmsing. The Bishop Helmsing Institute offered a three-year faith formation program for lay people..

Catholic Church titles
Preceded by John Patrick Cody	Bishop of Kansas City–St. Joseph; 1962–1977	Succeeded by John Joseph Sullivan
Preceded by none	Bishop of Springfield–Cape Girardeau; 1956–1962	Succeeded by Ignatius Jerome Strecker
Preceded by –	Auxiliary Bishop of St. Louis; 1949–1956	Succeeded by –
