= Central Catholic High School (Grand Island, Nebraska) =

Location
- 1200 North Ruby Avenue; Grand Island, (Hall County), Nebraska 68803; United States; 40°55′49.5″N 98°21′52″W

Information
- Type: Private, coeducational
- Motto: Tradition of Excellence
- Religious affiliation: Roman Catholic Roman Catholic Diocese of Grand Island
- Patron saint: Elizabeth Ann Seton
- Principal: Jordan Engle
- Chaplain: Father Sid Bruggeman
- Grades: 6–12
- Colors: Columbia blue, navy blue and white
- Fight song: Crusader Fight Song
- Athletics conference: Centennial Conference
- Team name: Crusaders
- Rival: Scotus Central Catholic, Hastings St. Cecilia, Kearney Catholic
- Accreditation: North Central Association of Colleges and Schools
- Newspaper: The Lance
- Yearbook: Crusader
- Tuition: $5,000
- Activities Director: Bill Gavers
- Website: www.gicentralcatholic.org

Central Catholic High School is a Roman Catholic high school in Grand Island, Nebraska, United States. It is located in the Roman Catholic Diocese of Grand Island.

== Background ==
Central Catholic was founded in 1956 and has since served the Grand Island area. It began as a four-year high school for grades 9–12. Grades seven and eight were added later to form a junior-senior high school. In 1997, a $1-million building expansion was completed and sixth grade was added to the school. Today, Central Catholic consists of a middle school for grades 6-8 and a high school for grades 9–12.

Central Catholic is fully accredited by the Nebraska Department of Education and North Central Association of Colleges & Schools. All members of the administrative and teaching staff are certified by the State of Nebraska.

Central Catholic is primarily a college preparatory institution. The school seeks to meet the needs of all students through a diversified curriculum. At the middle school level, emphasis is placed on learning basic skills and exposing students to a wide variety of learning opportunities in a highly structured environment. At the high school level, a broad range of courses are offered to meet the individual needs of students. Religious instruction is an integral part of the curriculum for both middle school and high school students. To promote moral and spiritual development, Christian principles based upon Catholic tradition are incorporated into every phase of daily school life.

== Athletics ==
Central Catholic is a member of the Nebraska School Activities Association and the Centennial Conference. They have won the following NSAA State Championships:

- Boys' football - none (runner-up - 1976, 1979, 1983, 2025)
- Boys' baseball - none (runner-up - 1970)
- Girls' golf - 1999, 2000, 2012
- Boys' tennis - 1963, 1994, 1995, 1996, 1998, 2002
- Girls' volleyball - 1981, 1987, 1988, 1992, 1993, 1994, 2005, 2007 2010, 2019, 2022 (runner-up - 1982, 1984, 1995, 1996, 2002, 2006, 2008, 2009, 2017)
- Boys' basketball - 2000, 2021 (runner-up - 2007, 2020, 2022)
- Boys' wrestling - 1982
- Boys' golf - 2002, 2003, 2004, 2015, 2016, 2018, 2019
- Girls' tennis - 1999, 2000, 2001
- Boys' track and field - 2004, 2022 (runner-up - 2021)
- Boys' chess - 2005
