= Cathedral of the Nativity of the Blessed Virgin Mary (Grand Island, Nebraska) =

Catholic Cathedral in Nebraska, United States

- U.S. National Register of Historic Places
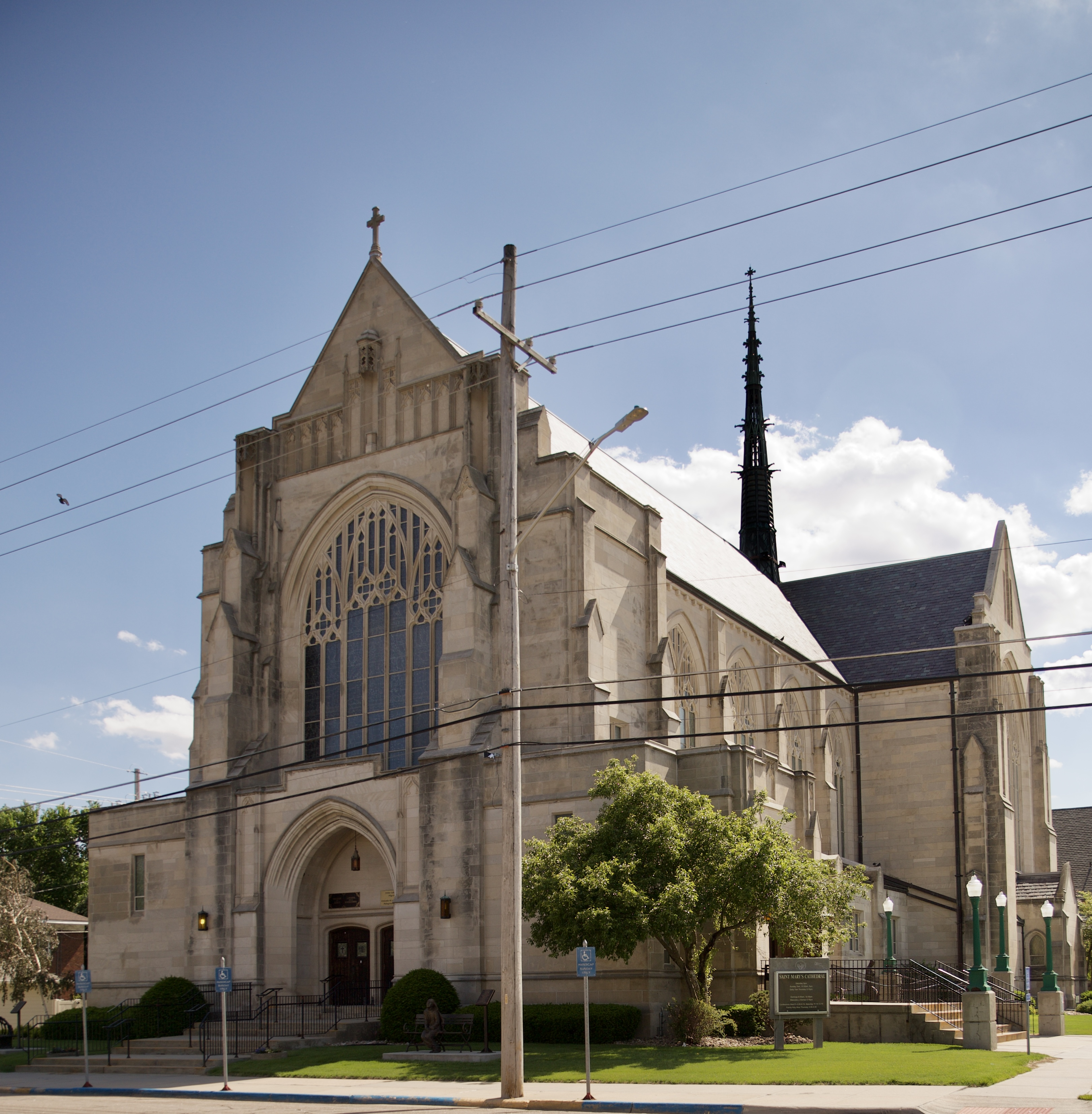
- The Cathedral in 2026.

- Location within Nebraska Location within the United States
- Location: 204 South Cedar Street; Grand Island, Nebraska
- Coordinates: 40°55′16″N 98°20′32″W
- Built: 1926-1928
- Architect: Brinkman & Hagan
- Architectural style: Late Gothic Revival
- NRHP reference No.: 82003189
- Added to NRHP: July 15, 1982

The Cathedral of the Nativity of the Blessed Virgin Mary, also known as St. Mary's Cathedral, is the cathedral church for the Roman Catholic Diocese of Grand Island located in Grand Island, Nebraska, United States. It was listed on the National Register of Historic Places in 1982. It has a seating capacity of 900 people.

== History ==
=== Parish and church ===
In 1859 two brothers from Iowa City, Iowa, Patrick and Richard Moore, settled in Hall County, Nebraska. They are believed to be the first Catholic settlers in the county. Other Catholic families moved to the area as well. The first priest to visit the area, the Rev. Almire Fairmont, arrived two years later. He celebrated Mass in the Moores' log dwelling, which was located three miles west of the present town of Wood River. In the following years, a priest from Omaha or Columbus would visit once a year to celebrate Mass and administer the Sacraments.

After the railroad arrived in Hall County in 1868, it was decided that a church should be built. The Union Pacific Railroad donated the land in Grand Island in 1869 and a church, named St. Mary's, was built under the direction of the Rev. M.J. Ryan. The building, however, was destroyed by a windstorm before its dedication. A second attempt at building a church in 1873 was stopped because of an economic depression. A third attempt was initiated on February 17, 1877. The cornerstone was laid on May 7; the building was completed in July, and the new church was dedicated in September 1877. It was a frame structure built on a brick foundation. The Rev. P.J. Erlach was named the parish's first resident pastor in that year.

The parish continued to grow, and by the late 1880s a larger church was needed. The Rev. Wunibald Wolf was sent to Grand Island to build the church. Bishop James O’Connor of Omaha laid the cornerstone for the new church on August 15, 1888; the building was dedicated on July 7, 1889, by the diocesan vicar general, the Rev. R. Schaffel. The new brick and stone church measured 44 by 119 feet (13 m × 36 m), and featured two bell towers 104 feet (32 m) high; it cost $20,000 to build.

=== Diocese and cathedral ===
On March 8, 1912, Pope Pius X divided the Diocese of Omaha into two parts, establishing the Diocese of Kearney in western Nebraska. Four years later, Pope Benedict XV added four additional counties to the new diocese. In 1917, the see city was moved from Kearney to Grand Island, and the diocese was renamed accordingly.

St. Mary's Church, however, was considered inadequate for a cathedral. Bishop James Duffy studied building styles during his travels. He decided on the Gothic Revival style and construction was begun in 1926 and completed in 1928. The new cathedral was designed by Brinkman & Hagan and was modeled after Sainte-Chapelle in Paris. Cardinal Patrick Hayes of New York consecrated the new cathedral on July 5, 1928. The parish continued to grow and in 1949 Blessed Sacrament parish was created on the north side of the city. The present rectory was completed in 1951. The old rectory and two other houses were used as a convent until the present convent was completed in 1967.

The cathedral was redecorated in the 1950s and again in the 1980s. Old St. Mary's, which had been used as a gymnasium, was torn down in 1965. Two new parishes were created in Grand Island in 1973. St. Leo's was created in the southwest part of the city and Resurrection in the northwest. A new social hall was built on the site of the old St. Mary's School in 2001.

== Gallery ==
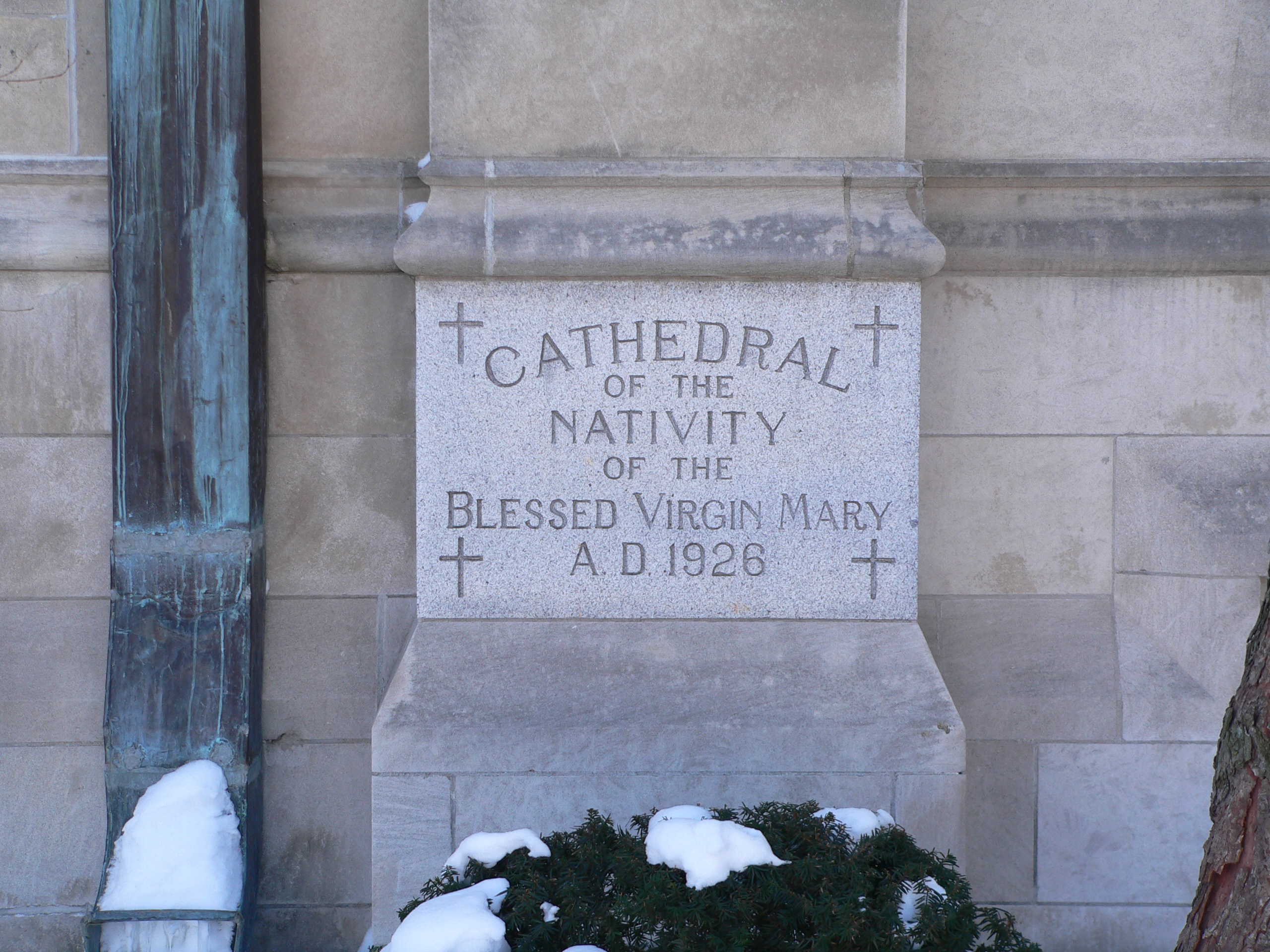
Cornerstone

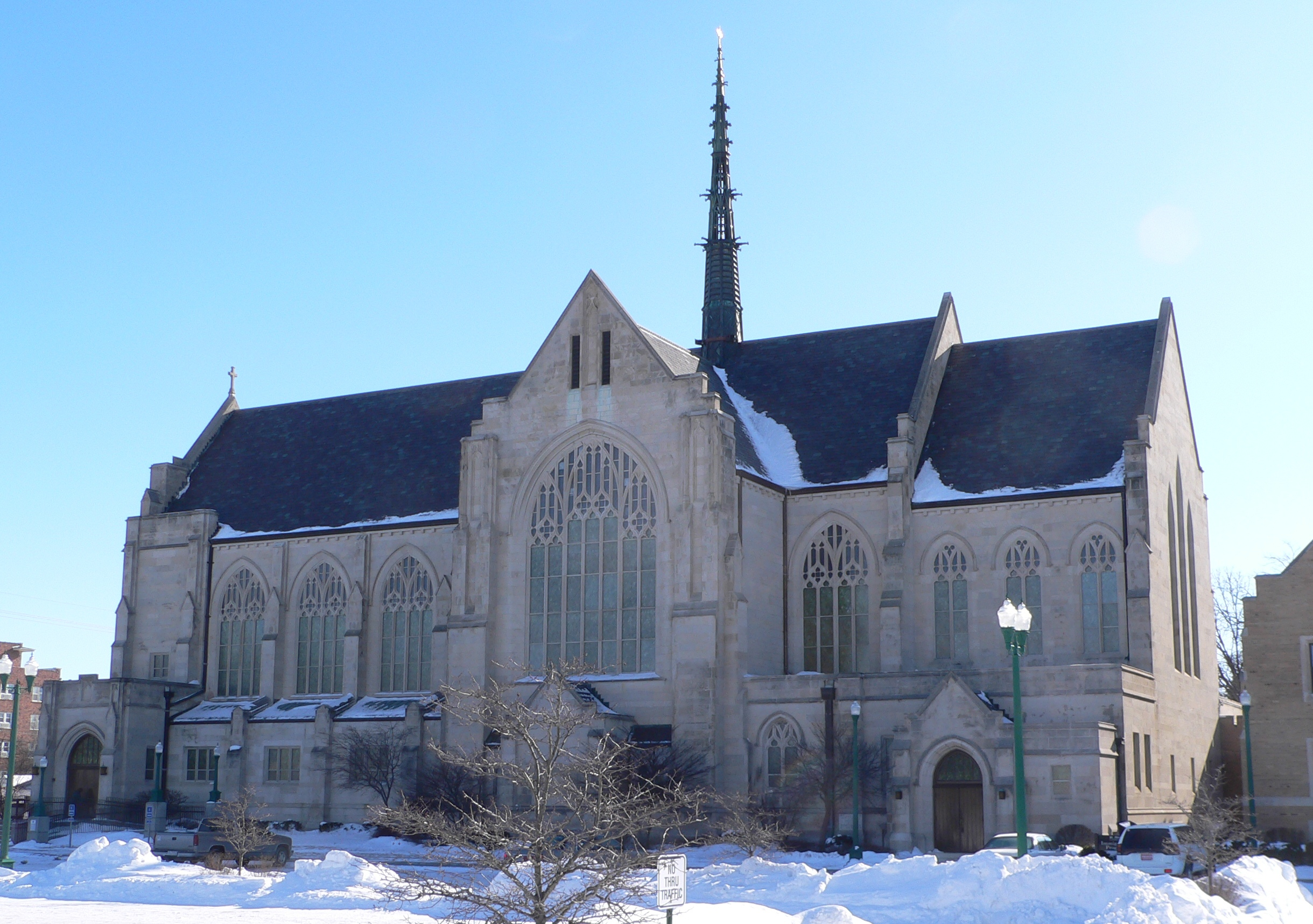
View from the north

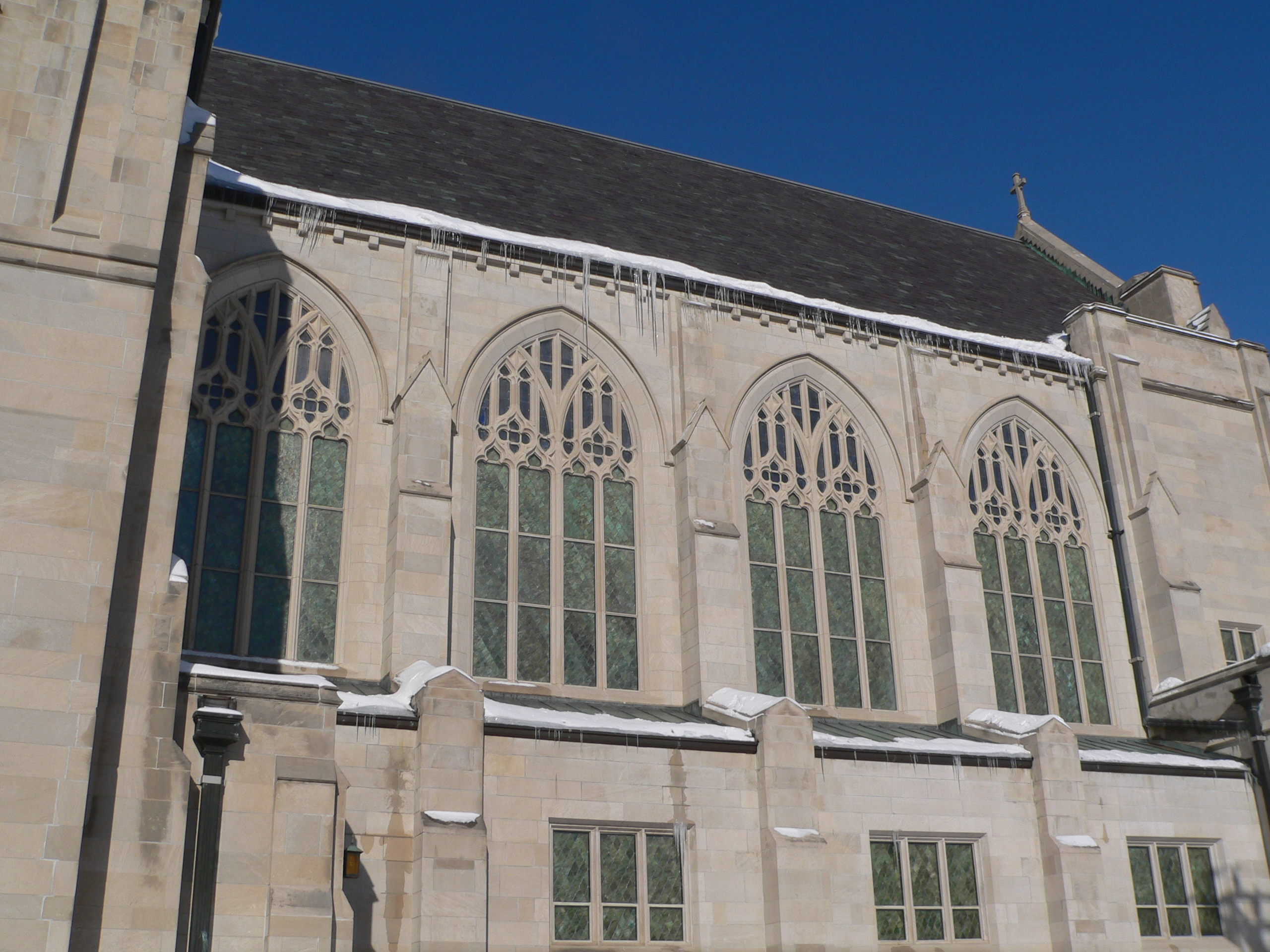
South windows

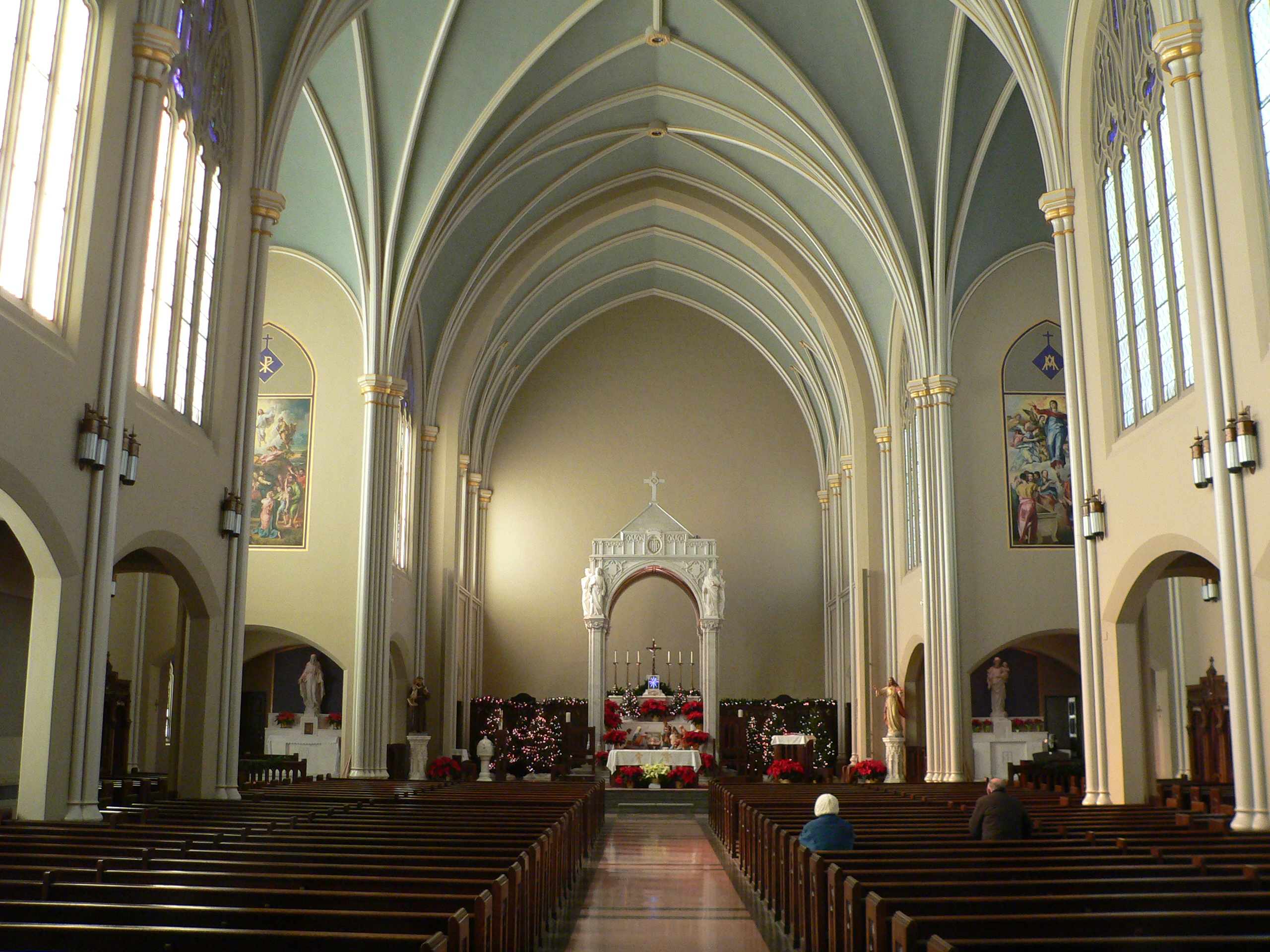
Cathedral Interior

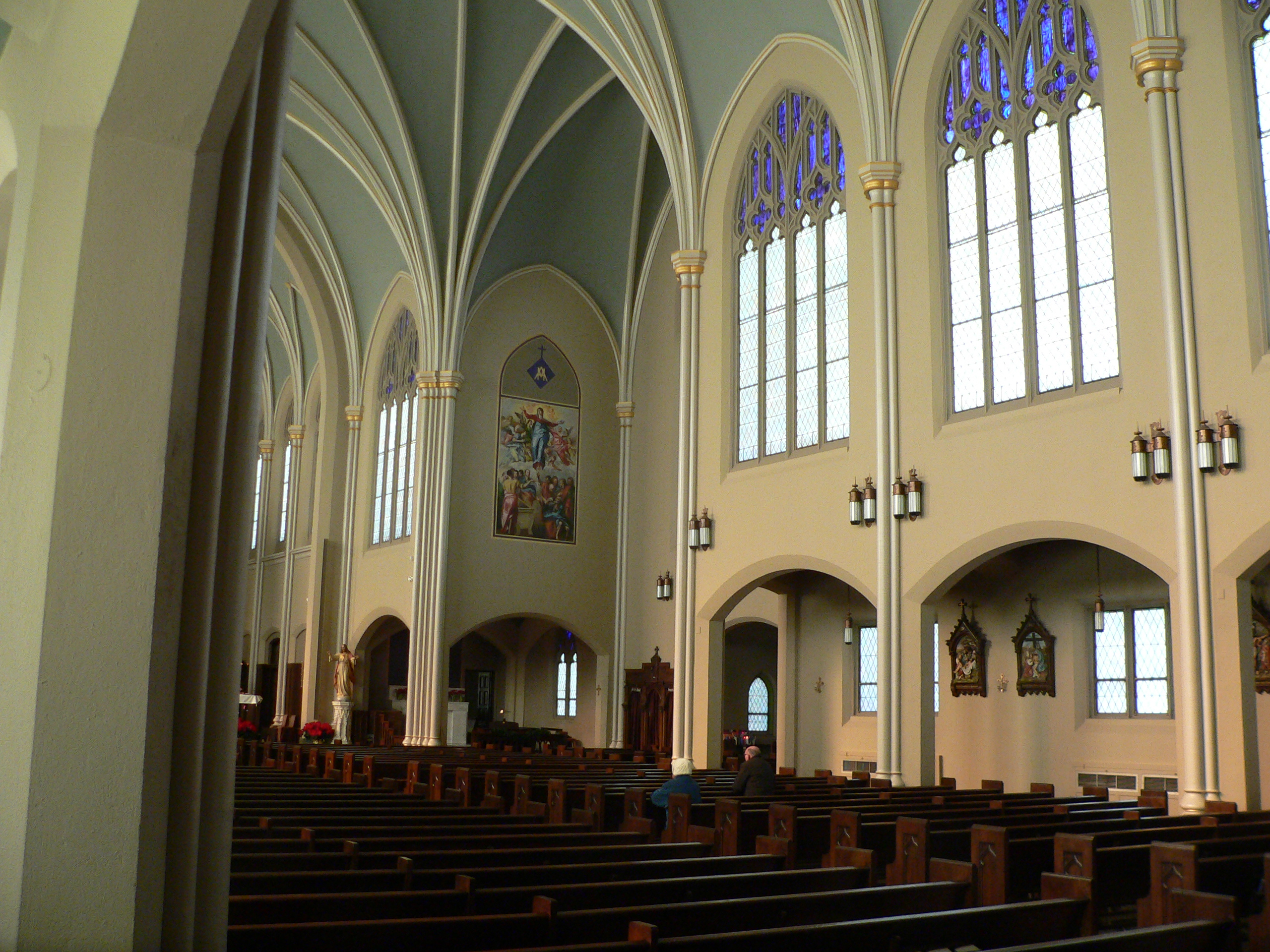
Cathedral Interior

== See also ==
- List of Catholic cathedrals in the United States
- List of cathedrals in the United States
