= Abortion in Alabama =

Abortion in Alabama is illegal. Historically, Alabama's abortion laws have evolved from strict regulations in the late 19th and early 20th centuries to a period of liberalization following the landmark 1973 Supreme Court decision in Roe v. Wade, which legalized abortion nationwide. However, Alabama has consistently enacted legislation aimed at restricting access to abortion.

In May 2019, Alabama passed one of the nation's most restrictive abortion laws, the Human Life Protection Act. This law sought to ban most abortions at any stage of pregnancy, with no exceptions for cases of rape or incest, only allowing abortions if there was a serious health risk to the mother. The law was granted an injunction until June 2022 when the U.S. Supreme Court overturned Roe v. Wade in Dobbs v. Jackson Women's Health Organization, allowing the Act to go into effect. The remaining three abortion clinics in the state were ordered to cease operating.

Abortion regulations in Alabama also include mandatory waiting periods, parental consent requirements for minors, and stringent guidelines for abortion clinics that many advocates argue are designed to limit the availability of abortion services in the state. In 2024, the Alabama Supreme Court ruled that frozen embryos should be considered children. The Constitution of Alabama explicitly bans the legal recognition of abortion.

Abortion remains a divisive issue in Alabama, with a 2014 survey by Pew Research Center concluding that 58% of surveyed adults in the state believe abortion should be illegal in most or all cases, and 37% indicating it should be legal. A strong correlation was observed between the opposition to abortion and conservative political views. The 2023 American Values Atlas reported that, in their most recent survey, 54% of Alabamians said that abortion should be legal in all or most cases.

== History ==
In Alabama between 1892 and 1935, there were 40 prosecutions and five convictions of women having abortions.

=== Legislative history ===
Status of the "heartbeat bills", i.e. abortion bans at around 6 weeks, by state (exceptions not marked): Heartbeat bills supplemented or rendered moot by abortion bans at all stages Abortion bans at all stages, but heartbeat bills blocked Other states with abortion bans at all stages, or states without abortion providers Heartbeat bill in force, without total abortion bans Heartbeat law partially passed by state legislature Law passed but blocked or struck down by court order

By the end of the 1800s, all states in the nation except Alabama had therapeutic exceptions in their legislative bans on abortions. In the 19th century, bans by state legislatures on abortion targeted protecting the life of the mother given the number of deaths abortions caused.

By the end of 1972, Mississippi allowed abortion only in cases of rape or incest, Alabama and Massachusetts allowed abortions only in cases where the woman's physical health was endangered. In order to obtain an abortion during this period, women would often travel from a state where abortion was illegal to states where it was legal.

=== Judicial history ===
The 1973 Supreme Court of the United States's decision in the Roe v. Wade ruling meant the state could no longer regulate abortion in the first trimester.

A 2016 Alabama law banned dilation & evacuation (D&E), which is the most common abortion procedure used in the second trimester. In August 2018, the Eleventh Circuit court ruled the D&E legislation to be unconstitutional, blocking it from enforcement. The US Supreme Court refused to hear an appeal in its 2019 term.

On February 6, 2019, Ryan Magers filed a wrongful death lawsuit against an abortion clinic, Alabama Women's Center, after his girlfriend had a then-legal elective abortion in January 2017. Magers also sued three employees of the clinic and the pharmaceutical company that manufactured the medication used to induce the abortion. Madison County Probate Judge Frank Barger recognized the status of the unborn fetus as a person on March 4, 2019, in accepting the case.

In May 2019, Planned Parenthood and the American Civil Liberties Union both said they would challenge Alabama's recently enacted abortion ban in the federal courts. In June 2019, it was reported that a woman, Marshae Jones, whose pregnancy was terminated after she was shot in the stomach in 2018 during a fight was arrested on grounds of manslaughter of the fetus, though the case was eventually dismissed.

On February 16, 2024, the Alabama Supreme Court ruled that frozen embryos used for in vitro fertilisation should be considered children. The UAB Hospital and other providers ended their IVF treatments in response. This is because couples are now allowed to file a lawsuit for the wrongful death of their embryos. This ruling raises questions about the status of frozen embryos, including whether they can be destroyed and the implications for pre-implantation genetic testing. The decision also intersects with broader debates around abortion and reproductive technology. On October 7, 2024, the United States Supreme Court declined to review the case.

In 2025, a federal judge ruled that the Alabama state's attorney general cannot prosecute people or organizations who help Alabama residents seek an abortion by traveling to another state.

Alabama enforces one of the toughest abortion bans in the country, allowing no exceptions. This law went into effect right after the U.S. Supreme Court's decision in the *Dobbs* case on June 24, 2022. After a federal judge decided in April 2025 that the state's Attorney General is not allowed to prosecute or threaten legal action against people or groups helping Alabama residents travel to other states for abortions, reproductive rights organizations in Alabama quickly restarted their activities.

In June 2026, on the fourth anniversary of the *Dobbs v. Jackson Women's Health Organization* ruling, Alabama lawmakers expressed their views largely along party lines. The decision led to stricter abortion laws, including a near-total ban. Senator Katie Britt launched the website MOMS.gov to support pregnant women. Representatives Palmer and Aderholt praised the ruling, while Representative Sewell criticized it for restricting reproductive healthcare.

=== Clinic history ===
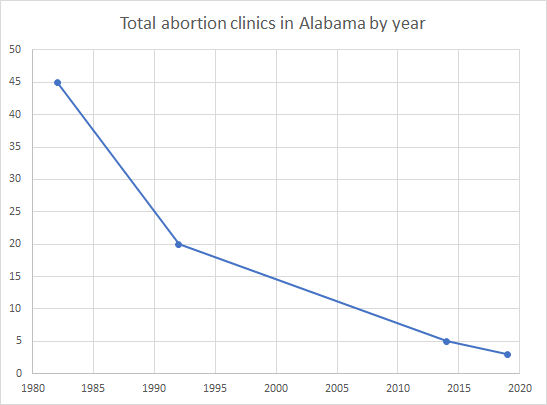
Total abortion clinics in Alabama by year

Between 1982 and 1992, the number of abortion clinics in Alabama decreased by 25 clinics, going from 45 in 1982 to 20 in 1992. In 2014, there were five abortion clinics, and 93% of the counties in the state did not have any clinics, leaving 59% of women in the state aged 15–44 without access to a local abortion clinic as of that year. In 2017, there were two Planned Parenthood clinics, both of which offered abortion services, in Alabama, which at the time had a population of 1,117,288 women aged 15–49.

In March 2019, there were five abortion clinics in Alabama, all of which were located in urban areas — Birmingham, Huntsville, Tuscaloosa, Mobile and Montgomery. Of the five clinics operating in March 2019, one was only open on weekends.

In 2019, the Yellowhammer Fund provided financial assistance (paying for their abortions) to women at three abortion clinics in Alabama. In May and June of that year, Alabama's abortion clinics were receiving regular calls from women inquiring whether they could obtain a legal abortion as legislative changes resulted in confusion over abortion rights in the Alabama.

As of 2021, only three abortion clinics remained in Alabama: West Alabama Women's Center in Tuscaloosa, Reproductive Health Services in Montgomery, and Alabama Women's Center in Huntsville. Currently, Alabama restricts advertising of abortion clinics. For abortion clinics in Alabama to remain in business at that time, they had to abide by abortion-care policies. Alabama passed additional medically unnecessary codes and required that they be followed to operate an abortion clinic. In some cases codes were passed to target specific clinics; for example, a 2016 law was enacted that prohibited abortion clinics from renewing their current license if the clinic was within 2,000 feet of an elementary or middle school to target a specific clinic. Clinics must have access to a hospital in the same geographical area as the abortion facility.

As of 2022, Alabama's three remaining abortion clinics have been ordered to stop all abortion procedures.

Abortion has become virtually impossible to access in Alabama after a federal court banned the mailing of mifepristone, the abortion pill. Following the end of Roe v. Wade in 2022, surgical abortions became illegal in Alabama, but women were not prosecuted for having them. This allowed women to still obtain mifepristone from other states. Medication abortions were more common than surgical ones, making up about 54% before the ruling. In 2021, Alabama had over 8,294 abortions, with 3,653 being medical abortions.

== Alabama and cardiogenesis ==
In 2006, Alabama was one of 23 states to have a detailed abortion-specific informed consent requirement. By law, abortion providers in Alabama, Louisiana and Mississippi were required to perform an ultrasound before providing women with an abortion, despite that an ultrasound in the first trimester has no medical necessity. In 2013, state Targeted Regulation of Abortion Providers (TRAP) law applied to medication induced abortions and private doctors' offices in addition to abortion clinics.

Alabama was one of five states nationwide that tried, and failed, to pass a so-called 'fetal heartbeat bill' (Note: The American College of Obstetricians and Gynecologists states that: "Until the chambers of the heart have been developed and can be detected via ultrasound (roughly 17-20 weeks of gestation), it is not accurate to characterize the embryo's or fetus's cardiac development as a heartbeat." They also argue that the term 'fetal heartbeat' should be replaced with: ""Embryonic cardiac activity" before eight weeks of gestation and "fetal cardiac activity" after eight weeks of gestation" ACOG Guide to Language and Abortion) in 2014. House Bill 490 prohibiting abortions once a cardiogenesis or "fetal heartbeat" is detected passed the Lower House (73–29) on March 4, 2014. The bill later died in committee. Despite this, Alabama's Lower House was the first state in the nation to pass such a bill. The Alabama state legislature tried and failed in 2015, 2016, and 2017 to pass a fetal heartbeat bill, each time being joined by two, three, and seven other states respectively.

As of March 2019, the law required women wait 24 hours after their initial consult before they could obtain a second appointment for the actual procedure. State law at the time prohibited state-funded health insurance companies from offering abortion services unless the life of the woman was at risk, or the pregnancy was a result of rape or incest.

One of the most active years for state legislatures in terms of trying to pass abortion rights restrictions was 2019. State governments with Republican majorities began to push these bills after conservative Supreme Court candidate Brett Kavanaugh was confirmed as a US Supreme Court judge, replacing the more liberal Anthony Kennedy. These state governments generally saw this as a positive sign that new moves to restrict abortion rights would face less resistance from the courts.

== The Alabama Human Life Protection Act ==
The most recent act relating to the abortion in Alabama is "The Alabama Human Life Protection Act" also known as the Human Life Protection Act. Formally, the act has the name of House Bill 314. The bill was drafted by the Alabama Pro-Life Coalition. The bill, which banned abortions at every stage of pregnancy and made it a crime for doctors to perform the procedure (except in the case of a medical emergency), was introduced into the Lower House on April 2, 2019. The bill passed the Lower House on April 30, the Senate on May 14, and was signed into law by then-Governor Kay Ivey on May 15, 2019.

Formerly, abortion was allowed in cases of incest or rape. With the introduction of the Human Life Protection Act, these cases were no longer exempt. Additionally, cases in which mothers faced mental illness were declared insufficient to provide an exception. These restrictions made the bill one of the most aggressive anti-abortion laws in American history. Although the bill was approved by Alabama legislators, then-Governor Kay Ivey recognized that its aggressiveness would most likely not be approved in the federal court due to Roe v. Wade. Despite this, Alabama legislators hoped the introduction of the bill could weaken pre-existing abortion protections.

Shortly after the introduction of the Human Life Protection Act, Planned Parenthood and ACLU of Alabama filed a lawsuit to challenge the anti-abortion bill on May 24, 2019. Serving as plaintiffs to the case were the three remaining abortion clinics in Alabama: Alabama Women's Center, Reproductive Health Services, and the West Alabama Women's Center.

The controversial bill was set to go into effect on November 15, 2019. However, on October 29, 2019, the bill was blocked by the federal court. US District Judge Myron Thompson granted a preliminary injunction on October 28, 2019, until the court was able to resolve the case in full. Federal judge Myron H. Thompson declared the bill defied previous rulings seen in Roe v. Wade and the U.S. Constitution. Furthermore, Judge Thompson expressed that the bill could cause "serious and irreparable harm", referring to the Planned Parenthood Southeast v. Strange lawsuit from 2014 that identified a near-total ban as adding a financial burden to women and their need to access abortion services. As a result of this need, women are more likely to take unsafe measures to end pregnancies. Judge Thompson lifted the injunction after the Supreme Court overturned Roe v. Wade on June 24, 2022, allowing the law to go into effect.

== Statistics ==
Between 1972 and 1974, Alabama had an illegal abortion mortality rate of 0.1 and 0.9 per million women aged 15–44. In 1990, 456,000 women in the state faced the risk of an unintended pregnancy. In 2010, the state had nine publicly-funded abortions, none of which were federally or state funded.

In 2014, 59% of women in Alabama lived in a county without an abortion clinic. There was an average of one abortion clinic every 10,483 square miles that year.

In the year following the overturn of Roe v. Wade in 2022, 210 pregnant women in a dozen states were criminally charged for conduct associated with their pregnancy, pregnancy loss or birth. Six states — Alabama, Mississippi, Ohio, Oklahoma, South Carolina and Texas — accounted for most cases.

Number of reported abortions, abortion rate and percentage change in rate by geographic region and state in 1992, 1995 and 1996
| Census division and state | Number | | | Rate | | | % change 1992–1996 |
|---|---|---|---|---|---|---|---|
| Census division and state | 1992 | 1995 | 1996 | 1992 | 1995 | 1996 | % change 1992–1996 |
| Total | 1,528,930 | 1,363,690 | 1,365,730 | 25.9 | 22.9 | 22.9 | –12 |
| East South Central | 54,060 | 44,010 | 46,100 | 14.9 | 12 | 12.5 | –17 |
| Alabama | 17,450 | 14,580 | 15,150 | 18.2 | 15 | 15.6 | –15 |
| Kentucky | 10,000 | 7,770 | 8,470 | 11.4 | 8.8 | 9.6 | –16 |
| Mississippi | 7,550 | 3,420 | 4,490 | 12.4 | 5.5 | 7.2 | –42 |
| Tennessee | 19,060 | 18,240 | 17,990 | 16.2 | 15.2 | 14.8 | –8 |

Number, rate, and ratio of reported abortions, by reporting area of residence and occurrence and by percentage of abortions obtained by out-of-state residents, US CDC Estimates
| Location | Residence | | | Occurrence | | | % obtained by out-of-state residents | Year | Ref |
|---|---|---|---|---|---|---|---|---|---|
| Location | No. | Rate^ | Ratio^^ | No. | Rate^ | Ratio^^ | % obtained by out-of-state residents | Year | Ref |
| Alabama | -- | -- | -- | 13,358 | 14 | 215 | 9.3 | 1992 | |
| Alabama | -- | -- | -- | 14,221 | 15 | 236 | 12.3 | 1995 | |
| Alabama | -- | -- | -- | 13,826 | 14 | 229 | 14,6 | 1996 | |
| Alabama | 7,893 | 8.2 | 133 | 8,080 | 8.4 | 136 | 17.7 | 2014 | |
| Alabama | 6,618 | 6.9 | 111 | 5,899 | 6.2 | 99 | 13.1 | 2015 | |
| Alabama | 6,986 | 7.3 | 118 | 6,642 | 7.0 | 112 | 16.8 | 2016 | |
^number of abortions per 1000 women aged 15–44; ^^number of abortions per 1000 live births

=== Abortion incidents ===
Roughly 862,320 US abortions occurred in 2017, with .7% occurring in Alabama account. Although over 6,110 abortions occurred in Alabama in 2017, not all were performed on Alabama residents. Residents of other states traveled to Alabama for abortions, and some Alabama residents traveled to other states for abortions. Between 2014 and 2017 the Alabama abortion rate declined from 8 to 6 abortions per 100,000 women, a 25 percent decrease.

=== Restrictions on abortion ===
As of June 24, 2022, with the Supreme Court's overturning of Roe v. Wade, abortion in Alabama became illegal except when the life of the pregnant individual is in danger. There are not exceptions for rape or incest. On August 28, 2023, attorneys for Attorney General Steve Marshall wrote in a court filing that the attorney general will prosecute those who help a pregnant person leave the state to get an abortion.

Although there is supposedly an exception to the abortion ban in the case of fatal fetal abnormalities, the exception has not been used because doctors do not want to risk losing their medical license or facing jail time, meaning that patients have to leave the state in order to receive an abortion regardless.

== Abortion rights views and activities ==
=== Views ===
Abortion is a divisive issue in the state, with 37% of adults believing it should be legal in all or most cases and 58% believing it should be illegal in all or most cases in 2014. According to a 2014 Public Religion Research Institute (PRRI) study, 60% of white women, the same percentage as white men, in the state believed that abortion should be illegal in all or most cases.

In 2018, fifty-nine percent of Alabamians voted in favor of a state constitutional amendment declaring the state's policy to recognize the "rights of the unborn".

Politically, the Alabama Executive Governor, Senate, and House report a majority of anti-abortion views. In recent years, white evangelical women have played a major role in helping Republican male anti-abortion rights candidates get elected. One of the biggest groups of women who oppose legalized abortion in the United States are southern white evangelical Christians.

With states like Alabama and Georgia passing restrictive abortion laws in early 2019, some businesses announced they would boycott these states. Birmingham Mayor Randall Woodfin said that these boycotts would likely mean two tech companies would not base themselves in the city. Other states moved to try to take advantage of this political situation, including New Jersey, where Governor Phil Murphy related a statement that said, "New Jersey is open for business for any company that, given the assault on a woman's right to choose perpetrated by states like Alabama and Georgia, is seeking a home that recognizes basic constitutional rights. [...] New Jersey offers not only a hospitable business climate, but also maintains its progressive values, which include defending a woman's right to choose."

Yellowhammer Fund President Amanda Reyes said in 2019, "Republicans don't have fewer abortions than Democrats or liberals or anarchists or communists. It's that our political rhetoric paints people who have abortions as largely the same—poor women, young women, irresponsible women, women who hate children. [...] It's gotten us to a point where we can't see the fact that we're all having abortions, and we're doing it for reasons we personally think matters—and that's all that matters. Pro-life women are having abortions, too."

=== Organizations ===
The Yellowhammer Fund is an organization that financially assists women in Alabama who are seeking an abortion but have difficulty paying for one. In May 2020, The Yellowhammer Fund purchased West Alabama's Women Center from retiring owner, Gloria Gray. The organization purchased the clinic to ensure it would continue providing abortion services to the area. Yellowhammer Fund is currently striving to add additional services to the clinic, including hormone therapy for transgender people, midwifery and doula care, and gynecological care.

People Organizing for Women's Empowerment and Rights House (P.O.W.E.R. House) houses the Montgomery Area Reproductive Justice Coalition. It currently serves as Montgomery's only abortion clinic. Additionally, the clinic provides transportation and housing to those in need of these services.

American Civil Liberties Union of Alabama (ACLU) is an organization striving to protect the right to abortion for all people. ACLU's work centers around the courtroom to stop extreme attacks to women's reproductive rights. Additionally, ACLU ensures governmental policies provide access to affordable contraception options.

=== Donations ===
After Alabama passed its abortion legislation in 2019, The National Network of Abortion Funds received more than US$262,000 in donations from more than 12,000 people. Yellowhammer Fund also saw a surge in donations. Because of fundraising efforts by a single activist, the organization earned close to US$30,000 in donations in a three-hour period.

=== Protests ===
On May 19, 2019, women from Montgomery participated in an abortion rights march, the "March for Reproductive Freedom", outside the Alabama Capitol building as part of a #StoptheBans rally, a protest against the new abortion law signed by Governor Kay Ivey a week prior. In conjunction to this protest, other Alabama protests took place in Birmingham, Huntsville, and Mobile on May 19, 2019. The Birmingham rally was held in Kelly Ingram Park and had 2,000 supporters. The rally in Huntsville had support from 1,000 people and was held in Butler Green Park. Mobile hosted two rallies, one in Bienville Square and the other in downtown Mobile. A smaller rally supporting the movement was held in Florence, Alabama.

Following the overturn of Roe v. Wade on June 24, 2022, in Alabama abortion rights protesters marched from the Alabama Department of Archives and History to the Alabama State Capitol in Montgomery on June 26. Protests were also held in Birmingham, Huntsville, and Mobile.

== Anti-abortion views and activities ==
=== Activities ===
North Jefferson Women's Center is a non-profit family planning clinic in Fultondale that opposes abortions. In 2019, they sought funds for a new ultrasound machine to assist pregnant women using their services. Unable to pay for it themselves, the Southern Baptist organization Psalm 139 Project donated funds to support the clinic, which teaches that life begins at conception. The North Jefferson Women's Center will never refer women to an abortion provider, even if the pregnant woman desires such information.

The Southern Baptist Convention held its annual convention in Birmingham in June 2019. The timing was coincidental with the efforts in the state to restrict legal abortion access, but opposing legal abortions was part of their planned two-day discussion.

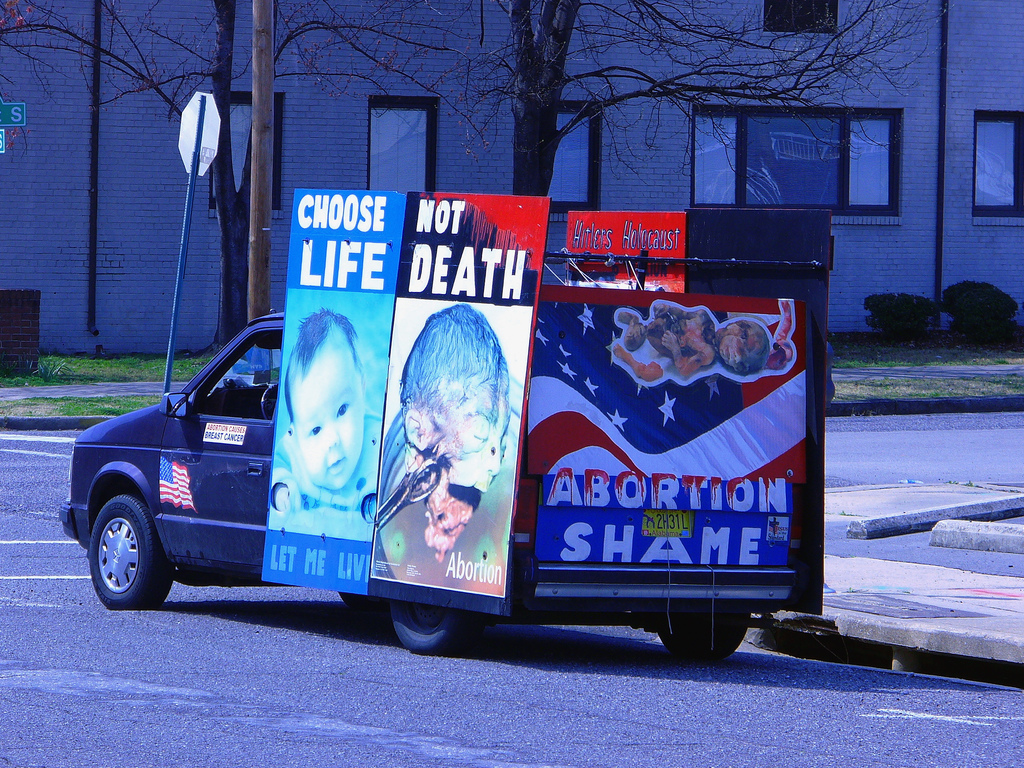
An anti-abortion van parked outside of an abortion clinic

=== Violence ===
On May 12, 1984, two men entered a Birmingham, Alabama clinic on Mother's Day weekend shortly after a woman opened the doors at 7:25 A.M. Forcing their way into the clinic, one of the men threatened the woman not to prevent the attack, while the other, wielding a sledgehammer, did between US$7,500 and US$8,500 of damage to suction equipment. Authorities later identified the man who damaged the equipment as Edward Markley. Markley is a Benedictine priest who was the Birmingham diocesan Coordinator for Pro-Life Activities. Markley was convicted of first-degree criminal mischief and second-degree burglary. His accomplice was not identified.

The following month, June 15, 1984, Markley entered a women's health center in Huntsville, Alabama. Kathryn Wood, one of the workers, received back injuries and a broken neck vertebrae while preventing Markley from splashing red paint on the clinic's equipment. Markley was convicted of first-degree criminal mischief, one count of third-degree assault, and one count of harassment in the Huntsville attack.

Between 1993 and 2015, 11 people were killed at American abortion clinics. The anti-abortion group named Army of God claimed responsibility for Eric Robert Rudolph's 1997 shrapnel bombing of abortion clinics in Atlanta and Birmingham. The organization embraces being labelled Christian terrorists. On January 29, 1998, Robert Sanderson, an off-duty police officer who worked as a security guard at an abortion clinic in Birmingham, Alabama, was killed while working at the clinic when it was bombed. Rudolph admitted responsibility for the bombing, and he was also charged with three Atlanta bombings: the 1997 bombing of an abortion center, the 1996 Centennial Olympic Park bombing, and another bombing of a lesbian nightclub. He received two life sentences for his crimes.
