= Roman Catholic Diocese of Birmingham =

Roman Catholic Diocese of Birmingham may refer to:

- Diocese of Birmingham in Alabama in the US
- Archdiocese of Birmingham in England
