= David Foley (disambiguation) =

David Foley (born 1987) is an English professional footballer.

David Foley may also refer to:

- David Edward Foley (1930–2018), American Roman Catholic prelate
- Dave Foley (born 1963), Canadian actor
- Dave Foley (American football) (born 1947), American football player during the 1960s and 1970s
- Dave Foley (rugby union) (born 1988), Irish rugby union player
