= Raymond James Boland =

His Excellency, The Most Reverend Raymond James Boland
- Bishop of Kansas City-St. Joseph
- See: Diocese of Kansas City-St. Joseph
- In office: 1993 to 2005
- Predecessor: John Joseph Sullivan
- Successor: Robert William Finn
- Previous post: Bishop of Birmingham in Alabama (1988 to 1993)

Orders
- Ordination: June 16, 1957 by Denis J. Moynihan
- Consecration: March 25, 1988 by Oscar Hugh Lipscomb

Personal details
- Born: February 8, 1932 County Cork, Ireland
- Died: February 27, 2014 (aged 82) County Cork
- Education: All Hallows College; University College Dublin
- Motto: Euntes docete omnes gentes (Go therefore and make disciples of all nations)

Styles of Raymond Boland
- Reference style: The Most Reverend
- Spoken style: Your Excellency
- Religious style: Monsignor

Raymond James Boland (February 8, 1932 – February 27, 2014) was an Irish-born prelate of the Roman Catholic Church. He served as the second bishop of the Diocese of Birmingham in Alabama from 1988 to 1993 and the fifth bishop of the Diocese of Kansas City-Saint Joseph in Missouri from 1993 to 2005.

== Biography ==
=== Early life ===
Raymond Boland was born in Monkstown, Cork County, Ireland, on February 8, 1932. He received his early education from the Christian Brothers in Cork. He trained at All Hallows College in Dublin, Ireland, as a missionary priest, while also taking a degree at University College Dublin.

=== Priesthood ===
Boland was ordained to the priesthood at All Hallows College by Bishop Denis J. Moynihan on June 16, 1957, for the Archdiocese of Washington in the District of Columbia.He and his brother, J. Kevin Boland, were one of two brother pairs ordained at the same year. Kevin Boland later became bishop of Savannah. Raymond Boland served as pastor of Saint Hugh of Grenoble Parish in Greenbelt, Maryland, from 1970 to 1973.

=== Bishop of Birmingham in Alabama ===
Boland was appointed bishop of Birmingham in Alabama on February 2, 1988, by Pope John Paul II. He was consecrated at the Cathedral of Saint Paul in Birmingham on March 25, 1988, by Archbishop Oscar Lipscomb.

=== Bishop of Kansas City-Saint Joseph ===
Boland was appointed bishop of Kansas City-Saint Joseph on June 22, 1993, by John Paul II.The Vatican accepted Boland's request for retirement as bishop of Kansas City-Saint Joseph on May 24, 2005. Boland died on February 27, 2014, in Cork, Ireland.

== Episcopal succession ==
Catholic Church titles
| Preceded by Joseph Gregory Vath | Bishop of Birmingham in Alabama; 1988–1993 | Succeeded by David Edward Foley |
| Preceded by John Joseph Sullivan | Bishop of Kansas City-Saint Joseph; 1993–2005 | Succeeded by Robert William Finn |
