= Alabama v. Jones =

U.S. legal case charging a pregnant woman for suffering a miscarriage

Alabama v. Jones was a U.S. legal case that took place in the state of Alabama. The case is notable as the first attempt, at least in the state, to charge a pregnant woman for suffering a miscarriage. The case was of special interest to feminist groups and reproductive rights groups. A grand jury charged her with manslaughter but the prosecutors ultimately dismissed the case.

== Background ==
Marshae Doricia Jones (born 1990) was five months pregnant when, on December 4, 2018, she became involved in a physical altercation with Ebony Jemison, then a co-worker, outside of a Dollar General in Pleasant Grove, Alabama. At some point during the altercation, Jemison, stating that she felt threatened by Jones, fired a single gunshot at Jones while Jemison sat in her vehicle. The bullet struck Jones in the abdomen, causing a miscarriage. Initially, Jemison was charged with manslaughter; but then a grand jury failed to indict her based on the state's stand-your-ground law. Authorities subsequently charged Jones with manslaughter, saying the fetus was the only victim of the situation and that Jones had knowingly endangered her pregnancy. Ultimately they chose not to bring the case to trial.

The larger background to the case is unclear. The Journal of Health Politics, Policy, and Law reported in 2013 that there have been "at least 413 people were arrested, detained, or forced to undergo medical interventions they didn't want, in the name of protecting the health of their fetuses".

== Judicial history ==
Marshae Jones and Ebony Jamison engaged in a fight outside of a Dollar General Store in Pleasant Grove on December 4, 2018, when Jones was five months pregnant. Reportedly, the fight was about the man who had impregnated Jones. Having been shot in the abdomen, Jones was taken to a hospital, where the fetus was declared nonviable before police officers arrived.

Six months later, Jones was taken into police custody on June 26, 2019, after being indicted in Jefferson County on a manslaughter charge for the death of her fetus that occurred because of the December 2018 fight. This indictment was made after police argued to a grand jury that Jones deserved to be blamed for the shooting and for not removing herself from the situation. They alleged that Jones had initiated and pressed the fight and that the fetus was the real victim, having no choice about being in the fight and relying on Jones for protection. The indictment stated that Jones "intentionally" caused the death of "Unborn Baby Jones by initiating a fight knowing she was five months pregnant", however, the office of District Attorney Lynneice O. Washington released a statement that it had not yet decided on whether to pursue the case, as the district attorney was out of the country at the time.

On July 1, 2019, it was reported that Jones' lawyers, J. Mark White, Augusta S. Dowd, Linda G. Flippo, Hope S. Marshall, and Curtis H. Seal, had filed for a motion to dismiss, on grounds that Alabama's legal statute for manslaughter contains language that forbids the prosecution of a woman in regard to her pregnancy.

On July 3, 2019, it was announced by the office of Alabama District Attorney that they would not prosecute the case. Jefferson County District Attorney Washington released a statement that stated she felt it was "not in the best interest of justice to pursue prosecution of Ms. Jones" and that she was "dismissing this case and no further legal action will be taken against Ms. Jones in this matter."

== Response to the case ==
Alabama Reproductive Rights Advocates released a statement that it was working with Jones to get her released on bail and to find her legal representation.

The president of the National Organization for Women and the executive director of the National Advocates for Pregnant Women voiced their support for Jones and brought up arguments about the rights of pregnant women, as well as Alabama's abortion laws.
