= Edward Markley =

American Roman Catholic priest

The Reverend Edward Markley O.S.B.
- Archdiocese: Diocese of Birmingham

Orders
- Ordination: June 10, 1966

Personal details
- Born: September 5, 1939
- Died: January 14, 2019 (aged 79) St. Bernard Abbey, Cullman, Alabama, United States
- Denomination: Roman Catholic

Edward Markley (September 5, 1939 - January 14, 2019) was an American Catholic Benedictine monk and priest. In 1985, Markley was arrested and convicted to five years in jail after he vandalized an abortion clinic with a sledgehammer.

== Life ==
Markley was born on September 5, 1939, and took vows as a monk at St. Bernard Abbey on June 12, 1960. He was later ordained to the Catholic priesthood on June 10, 1966.

On April 29, 1978, Markley, along with three students, was arrested at the Birmingham Women's Medical Clinic, after organizing a sit-in to protest abortion. On May 19, the four were convicted of trespassing, with Birmingham city Judge Tennant Smallwood fining Markley $50.

On May 12, 1984, Markley, along with one other man, used a sledgehammer to destroy equipment worth an estimated $8,000 at the abortion clinic. That year, Markley also splashed the Women's Community Health Center in Huntsville with red paint. He was ordered to pay $2,400 in restitution to the center and two employees who required medical treatment, but he refused and was arrested. He then spent 30 days in prison until an anonymous donor paid the amount. On June 16, 1986, he was convicted and sentenced to five years in prison, ineligible for parole, after violating probation terms to stay 500 feet away from abortion clinics. Markley reported that he did not find jail too bad and was pleased to gain some firsthand knowledge of it, having taught criminology courses in the past.

Markley's superior, Bishop Joseph Vath, issued a statement supportive of his actions, stating, "If we are convinced that abortion is the taking of innocent life according to God’s revealed word, he is not acting unjustly according to God’s law in defending the innocent unborn one...The right to life certainly supersedes the right to property or to privacy."

Markley was released from prison in 1987, after serving just over a year of his five-year sentence. His early release, with parole oversight, was credited to a combination of his exemplary behavior while in prison and an anti-abortion letter writing campaign to the parole board. After his release, Markley promised to continue his anti-abortion activism. He also “refused to apologize” for the sledgehammer incident, but stated that “on orders from his superiors he would not engage in any more destruction of property.”

Markley died peacefully at approximately 8:20 AM, on January 14, 2019, at the age of 79, in the St. Bernard Abbey at Cullman. The Abbey announced his death with a statement that said "He was an exemplary monk, who will be greatly missed by his brothers."
