= Abortion in New Jersey =

Abortion in New Jersey is legal at all stages of pregnancy. Abortion-related laws were drafted by the legislature by the end of the 1900s. These laws would be addressed in court during the 1800s as they related to application in prosecutions of people who could become pregnant for having abortions. During the 1940s, hospitals created committees to approve abortion requests, with the goal of trying to reduce the number of abortions performed at them. Currently, there are no required waiting times, and parental consent is not required. The Center for Reproductive Rights labels New Jersey as one of the most abortion-protective states in the country.

== History ==
The Committee on Abortion was created at the Monmouth Memorial Hospital in Long Branch during the 1940s with the goal of reducing the number of abortions at the hospital performed for therapeutic reasons. Monmouth Memorial Hospital's Dr. Robert A. MacKenzie said of this process, "No physician is going to ask the Committee to consider a case which he has not carefully studied, nor about which he does not feel strongly." MacKenzie went on to say about review committees, "No woman will consent to be taken to the hospital for possible examination and interrogation unless she desperately feels the need for help."

In March 2015, then-Governor (and later a US Republican presidential primary candidate) Chris Christie issued a statement to the Susan B. Anthony List that said he supported a 20-week abortion ban.

In September 2018, New Jersey Senator Cory Booker released documents related to Brett Kavanaugh's position on abortion when Kavanaugh was serving as a staff member in President George W. Bush's White House.

With states like Alabama and Georgia passing restrictive abortion laws in early 2019, some businesses announced they would boycott these states. Birmingham Mayor Randall Woodfin said that these boycotts would likely mean two tech companies would not base themselves in the city. Other states moved to try to take advantage of this political situation, including New Jersey where current Governor Phil Murphy related a statement that said, "New Jersey is open for business for any company that, given the assault on a woman's right to choose perpetrated by states like Alabama and Georgia, is seeking a home that recognizes basic constitutional rights. [...] New Jersey offers not only a hospitable business climate, but also maintains its progressive values, which include defending a woman's right to choose."

=== Legislative history ===
By the end of the 1800s, all states in the Union except Louisiana had therapeutic exceptions in their legislative bans on abortions. In the 19th century, bans by state legislatures on abortion were about protecting the life of the mother given the number of deaths caused by abortions; state governments saw themselves as looking out for the lives of their citizens.

In January 2015, a Pain-Capable Unborn Child Protection Act was discussed but was ultimately pulled because female Republican New Jersey House members expressed active opposition to the bill, with one major complaint being the only exception was in rape and only if the woman had reported the rape to the police.

As of 2017, Washington State, New Mexico, Illinois, Alaska, Maryland, Massachusetts, Connecticut, and New Jersey allow qualified non-physicians to prescribe drugs for medical abortions only. In early 2018, State Sen. Jeff Van Drew quietly withdrew his sponsorship of a bill that supported parental consent before a minor could request an abortion in New Jersey. As of March 2019, New Jersey remained one of the few states in the country that lacked mandatory consent for minors to get an abortion, either through parental notification or judicial bypass. Laws also existed that allowed women to drop off newborn infants at certain designated locations without providing their contact information and without facing legal consequences for child abandonment; such a law is called a Safe-Haven law. As of May 2018, the state did not require waiting periods or mandatory parental consent for abortions or prohibit state funding for abortions.

In January 2021, governor Phil Murphy signed the Freedom of Reproductive Choice Act into law, preserving the legal right to obtain an abortion, fulfilling a reelection campaign promise. The law was passed in anticipation of a possible Supreme Court decision to overturn Roe v. Wade, which was considered likely after the appointment of Amy Coney Barrett to the court.

=== Judicial history ===
In 1858, the New Jersey Supreme Court said of a woman, "Her guilt or innocence remains a common law. Her offense at the common law is against the life of the child.... The statue regards her as the victim of the crime, not as the criminal, as the object of protection, rather than of the punishment." The US Supreme Court's decision in 1973's Roe v. Wade ruling meant the state could no longer regulate abortion in the first trimester. However, the Supreme Court overturned Roe v. Wade in Dobbs v. Jackson Women's Health Organization, No. 19-1392, 597 U.S. ___ (2022) later in 2022, though abortion remains legally protected in New Jersey.

=== Clinic history ===
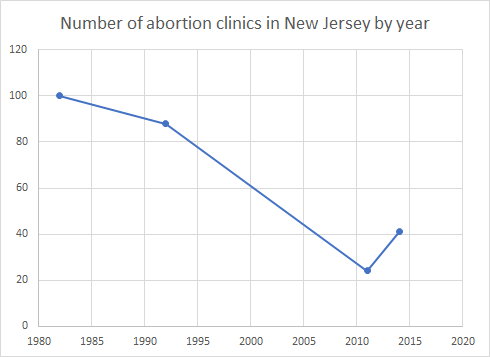
Number of abortion clinics in New Jersey by year

Between 1982 and 1992, the number of abortion clinics in the state decreased by twelve, going from 100 in 1982 to 88 in 1992. During the 1990s, Steven C. Brigham opened his first abortion clinic in the state in Wyomissing. While working at his clinics, Brigham performed a number of botched abortions, including late-term abortions. These were investigated and later resulted in Brigham losing his medical license. In 1996, the state had 94 abortion clinics and was one of only three to gain clinics in the period between 1992 and 1996. In 2011, there were 64 facilities which provided abortions of which 24 were abortion clinics. In 2014, there were 79 facilities that provided abortions of which 41 were abortion clinics. In 2014, 33% of the counties in the state did not have an abortion clinic. That year, 23% of women in the state aged 15–44 lived in a county without an abortion clinic. In March 2016, there were 26 Planned Parenthood clinics in the state. In 2017, there were 26 Planned Parenthood clinics in a state with a population of 2,046,346 women aged 15–49 of which 22 offered abortion services.

In 2014, Steven C. Brigham lost his medical license and was ordered by the New Jersey Board of Medical Examiners to divest his ownership in six abortion clinics.

Vikram Kaji owned a chain of abortion clinics in New Jersey in 2019, but had his medical license revoked in January 2019 because of physical and mental impairments as a result of a stroke. As part of his agreement when his license was revoked, he agreed to sell these in April 2019. His agreement also included a provision that would make it possible for state regulators to remove 62-year-old Steven C. Brigham as co-founder of seven of those clinics.

== Polling on Abortion Support and Regulation ==
According to a report published in 2022 by The Covid State Project, legal elective abortion in New Jersey holds support but much weaker support at the later the ages of the fetus.

2022 - Covid State Project	Support (S)	Oppose (O)	neither S nor O	No Opinion	Error Interval
Abortion support to protect the Woman's Health	47	18	22	13	6
Abortion support in Pregnancy caused by Rape	66	10	13	11	6
Abortion support for Financial Reasons	36	32	19	13	6
Abortion support for Fetal Health problems or Birth Defects	55	14	18	13	6
Abortion support if a Woman doesn't want to be Pregnant	44	25	21	11	6
Abortion support after Fetal Viability	22	40	20	18	6
Abortion support after 6 Weeks of Pregnancy	39	28	20	13	6
Abortion support after a Fetal Heartbeat is Detected	34	34	21	11	6

== Statistics ==
In the period between 1972 and 1974, the state had an illegal abortion mortality rate per million women aged 15–44 of between 0.1 and 0.9. In 1990, 1,042,000 women in the state faced the risk of an unintended pregnancy. In 2013, among white women aged 15–19, there were 1110 abortions, 2230 abortions for black women aged 15–19, 470 abortions for Hispanic women aged 15–19, and 860 abortions for women of all other races. In 2014, 61% of adults said in a poll by the Pew Research Center that abortion should be legal in all or most cases. The 2023 American Values Atlas reported that, in their most recent survey, 72% of people from New Jersey said that abortion should be legal in all or most cases. In 2017, the state had an infant mortality rate of 4.5 deaths per 1,000 live births.

The number of abortion clinics in New Jersey has been on the decline in recent years, going from 100 in 1982 to 88 in 1992 to 41 in 2014. State funding through Medicaid was available for poor women needing abortions, with 10,277 state funded abortions in 2010. There were 24,454 legal abortions performed in 2014, going up to 48,110 abortions in New Jersey in 2017.

Number of reported abortions, abortion rate and percentage change in rate by geographic region and state in 1992, 1995 and 1996
Census division and state	Number			Rate			% change 1992–1996
Census division and state	1992	1995	1996	1992	1995	1996	% change 1992–1996
Middle Atlantic	300,450	278,310	270,220	34.6	32.7	32	–8
New Jersey	55,320	61,130	63,100	31	34.5	35.8	16
New York	195,390	176,420	167,600	46.2	42.8	41.1	–11
Pennsylvania	49,740	40,760	39,520	18.6	15.5	15.2	–18

Number, rate, and ratio of reported abortions, by reporting area of residence and occurrence and by percentage of abortions obtained by out-of-state residents, US CDC estimates
Location	Residence			Occurrence			% obtained by out-of-state residents	Year	Ref
Location	No.	Rate^	Ratio^^	No.	Rate^	Ratio^^	% obtained by out-of-state residents	Year	Ref
New Jersey				55,320	31			1992	
New Jersey				61,130	34.5			1995	
New Jersey				63,100	35.8			1996	
New Jersey	24,454	14.2	237	24,181	14.0	234	5.2	2014	
New Jersey	24,563	14.4	239	24,470	14.3	238	5.5	2016	
^number of abortions per 1,000 women aged 15–44; ^^number of abortions per 1,000 live births

== Abortion financing ==
Seventeen states including New Jersey use their own funds to cover all or most "medically necessary" abortions sought by low-income women under Medicaid, thirteen of which are required by State court orders to do so. In 2010, the state had 10,277 publicly funded abortions, of which were zero federally funded and 10,277 were state funded.

Current Governor Phil Murphy passed a bill into law approving the allocation of $9.5 million in state taxpayer money to Planned Parenthood after President Donald Trump barred clinics that tell patients where they can obtain abortions or clinics offering abortions from receiving federal aid. In 2022 taxpayer funding to Planned Parenthood doubled to $19.9 million.

== Abortion rights views and activities ==
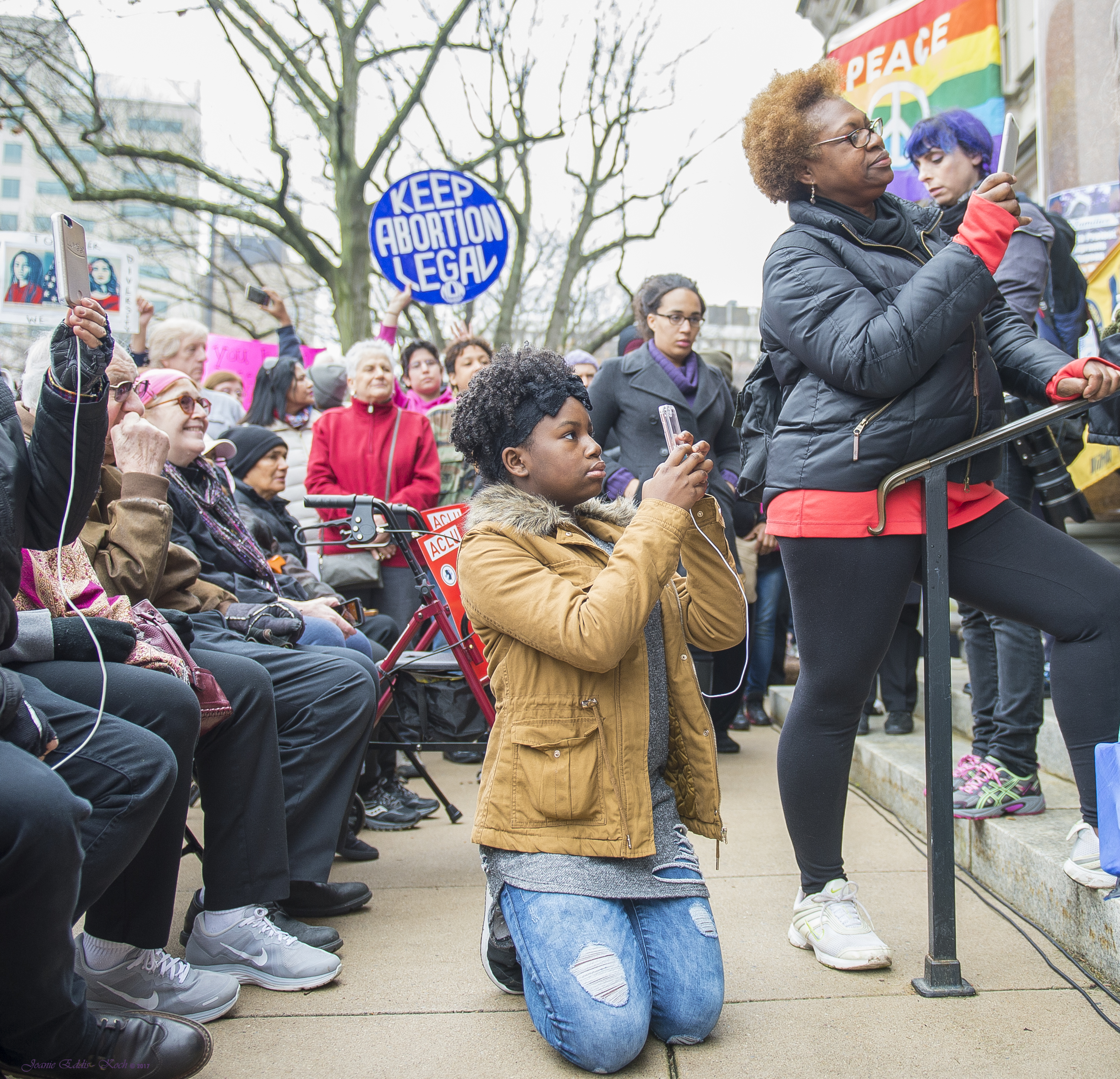
2017 Women's March in Trenton

=== Protests ===
The state has an abortion rights activist community. Women from the state participated in marches supporting abortion rights as part of a #StoptheBans movement in May 2019.

Following the overturn of Roe v. Wade on June 24, 2022, abortion rights protests in Teaneck, Morristown and South Orange were held on June 24. On June 26, protests continued for a third day in Fair Lawn, Jersey City and Hoboken.

== Anti-abortion rights views and activities ==
=== Views ===
Governor Chris Christie said in March 2015, "When I was preparing to run for Governor of New Jersey there were those who told me there was no way I would be elected as a pro-life candidate. [...] I told them that they were wrong, that the voters would accept the sincerity of my beliefs even if they felt differently. Today, I am a living example that being pro-life is not a political liability anywhere in America."

=== Violence ===
On February 14, 2018, Marckles Alcius, 34, a Haitian national from Lowell, Massachusetts, stole a bakery truck and drove it into a Planned Parenthood clinic in East Orange, New Jersey, injuring three people. He pleaded guilty to aggravated assault, causing injury or damage and being in possession of the stolen truck. He was sentenced to 10 years in prison.

== Minors without parental consent ==
In the state of New Jersey, minors are able to obtain abortion services without parental consent. As long as the minor has obtained the required information, such as risks and alternatives, the minor may give informed consent to these services without parental consent. All healthcare professionals are bound by law to adhere to HIPAA confidentiality rules, unless the minor is suspected of being a victim of child abuse or neglect, is a harm to self or others, or is listed by the insurance the minor may be attempting to use.
