= Joseph Vath =

American Roman Catholic prelate

The Most Reverend Joseph Vath
- Bishop of Birmingham; Titular Bishop of Novaliciana
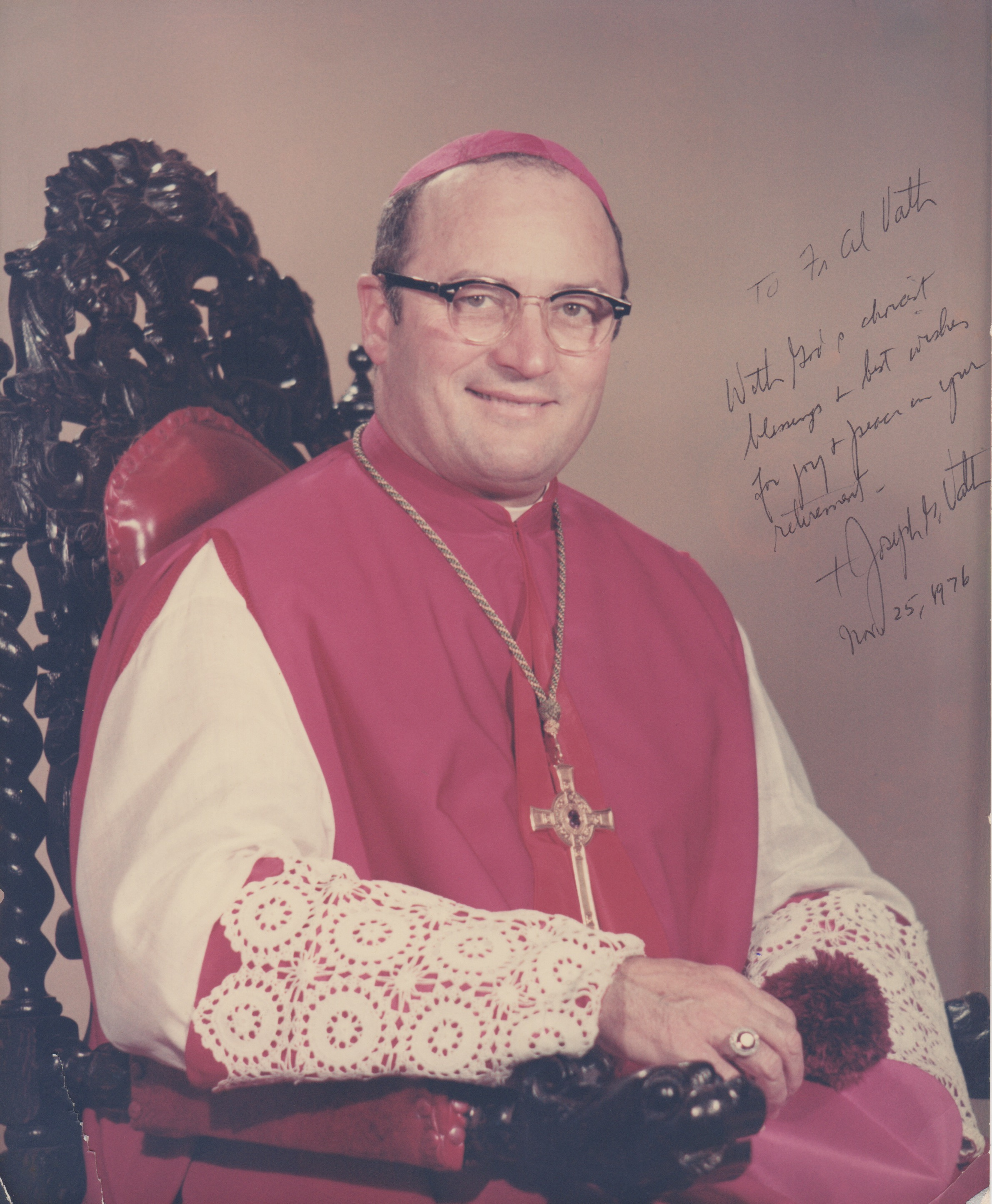
- Church: Roman Catholic Church
- Diocese: Diocese of Birmingham
- In office: 1969 to 1987
- Successor: Raymond James Boland
- Previous post: Auxiliary Bishop of Mobile-Birmingham (1966 to 1969)

Orders
- Ordination: June 7, 1941 by Joseph Francis Rummel
- Consecration: May 26, 1966 by Egidio Vagnozzi

Personal details
- Born: March 12, 1918 New Orleans, Louisiana, US
- Died: July 14, 1987 (aged 69) Birmingham, Alabama, US
- Motto: Animam pro ovibus ponere ("To lay down one's life for the sheep")

Joseph Gregory Vath (March 12, 1918 – July 14, 1987) was an American prelate of the Roman Catholic Church. He was the first bishop of the Diocese of Birmingham in Alabama from 1969 to 1987. He was previously an auxiliary bishop in the diocese from 1966 to 1969.

== Life and ministry ==
=== Early life ===
Joseph Vath was born on March 12, 1918, in New Orleans, Louisiana. He was ordained to the priesthood for the Archdiocese of New Orleans by Archbishop Joseph Francis Rummel in New Orleans on June 7, 1941.

=== Auxiliary bishop of Mobile-Birmingham ===
Vath was appointed as auxiliary bishop of Mobile-Birmingham and titular bishop of Novaliciana on March 4, 1966, by Pope Paul VI. He was consecrated in Birmingham, Alabama, on May 26, 1966, by Cardinal Egidio Vagnozzi.

=== Bishop of Birmingham in Alabama ===
Vath was appointed Bishop of Birmingham in Alabama, on September 29, 1969, by Paul VI. At that time, the Diocese of Mobile-Birmingham was split into the Diocese of Birmingham in Alabama and the Diocese of Mobile.

In the 1980s, after the Reverend Edward Markley vandalized a clinic providing abortion services, Vath issued a statement supportive of Markley. He stated that "if we are convinced that abortion is the taking of innocent life according to God’s revealed word, [Markley] is not acting unjustly according to God's Law in defending the innocent unborn one ... The right to life certainly supersedes the right to property or to privacy."

=== Death ===
Joseph Vath died in Birmingham, Alabama, on July 14, 1987, at age 69.

== Episcopal succession ==
Catholic Church titles
Preceded by None	Bishop of Birmingham in Alabama; 1969–1987	Succeeded by Raymond James Boland
