= Robert Joseph Baker =

American Roman Catholic prelate

His Excellency, The Most Reverend Robert Joseph Baker
- Bishop Emeritus of Birmingham
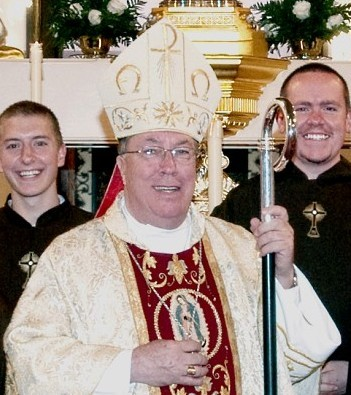
- Baker in 2009
- Church: Catholic Church
- Diocese: Birmingham
- Appointed: August 14, 2007
- Installed: October 2, 2007
- Term ended: March 25, 2020
- Predecessor: David Edward Foley
- Successor: Steven J. Raica
- Previous post: Bishop of Charleston (1999-2007)

Orders
- Ordination: March 21, 1970 by Paul Francis Tanner
- Consecration: September 29, 1999 by John Francis Donoghue, Gabriel Montalvo Higuera, and John J. Snyder

Personal details
- Born: June 4, 1944 (age 82) Willard, Ohio, US
- Education: Pontifical College Josephinum; Pontifical Gregorian University
- Motto: Rejoicing in hope

Styles of Robert Joseph Baker
- Reference style: His Excellency; The Most Reverend
- Spoken style: Your Excellency
- Religious style: Bishop

Robert Joseph Baker (born June 4, 1944, in Willard, Ohio) is an American prelate of the Roman Catholic Church. He served as bishop of the Diocese of Birmingham in Alabama from 2007 to 2019 and as bishop of the Diocese of Charleston in South Carolina from 1999 to 2007.

Baker became a member of the Ancient Order of Hibernians (AOH) in 2008 and became the state AOH chaplain in Alabama. He has written several books.

== Biography ==
=== Early life ===
Robert Baker was born on June 4, 1944, in Willard, Ohio. He entered the Pontifical College Josephinum in Columbus, Ohio, in 1966. He graduated with a Bachelor of Philosophy degree.

=== Priesthood ===
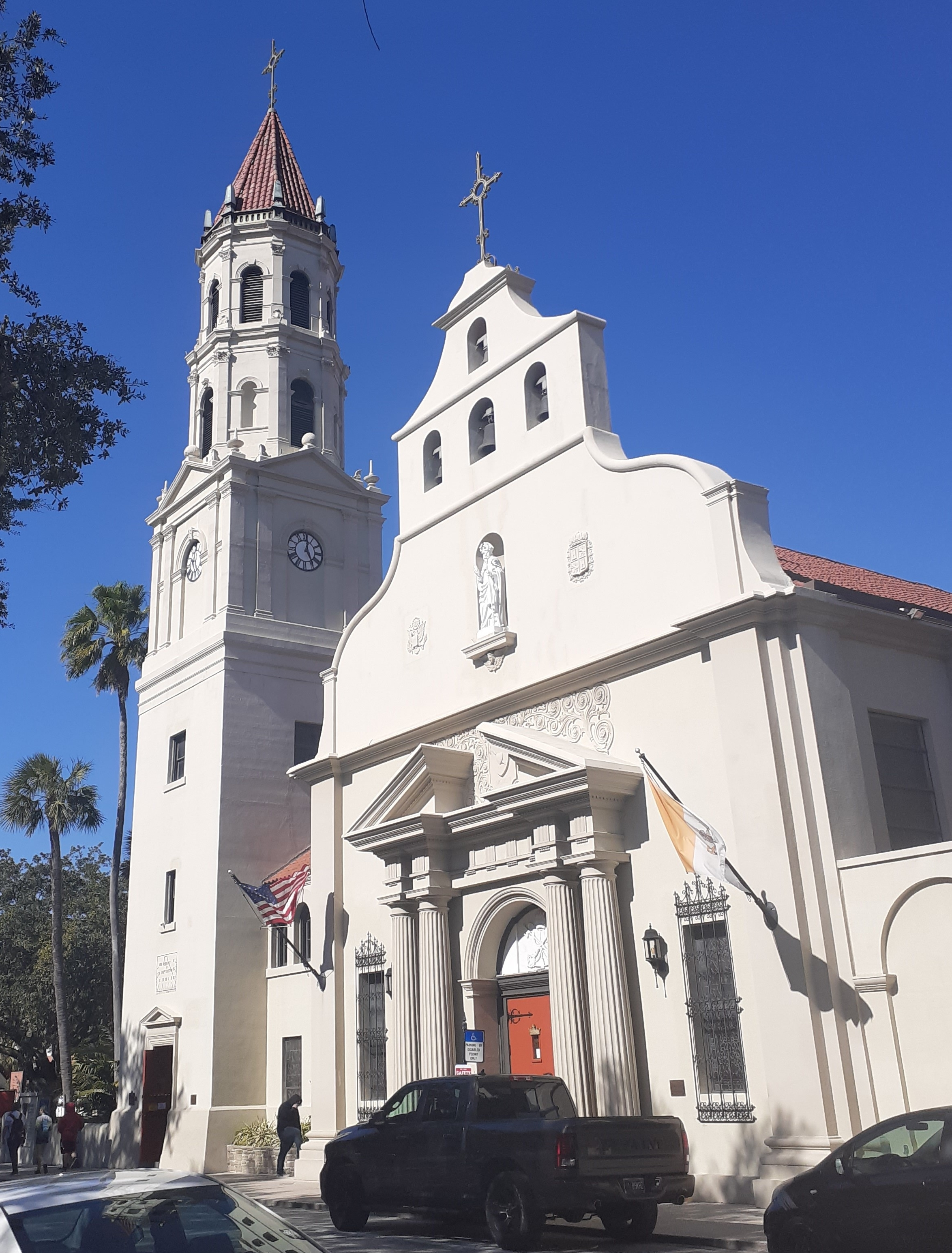
Baker served at the Cathedral Basilica of St. Augustine from 1976 to 1997.

On March 21, 1970, Baker was ordained into the priesthood at Saint Wendelin Church in Fostoria, Ohio, by Bishop Paul Tanner for the Diocese of St. Augustine. After his ordination, the diocese assigned Baker as assistant pastor of St. Paul Parish in Jacksonville Beach, Florida. In 1972, Baker went to Rome to study at the Pontifical Gregorian University, receiving a Licentiate of Sacred Theology in dogmatic theology in 1975.

In 1976, after returning to Florida, Baker was appointed director of the Catholic Student Parish at the University of Florida in Gainesville, and assigned parochial administrator of the Cathedral-Basilica of St. Augustine Parish in St. Augustine. During that time, he founded the St. Francis Ministry in Gainesville to assist individuals discharged from state mental hospitals who were homeless. In 1977, he was awarded a Doctor of Theology degree.

Baker was appointed in 1981 as instructor of sacramental theology at St. Vincent de Paul Seminary in Boynton Beach, Florida. In 1984, he was made pastor of the Cathedral-Basilica Parish of St. Augustine, and in 1997, was transferred to Christ the King Parish in Jacksonville, Florida.

=== Bishop of Charleston ===
On July 12, 1999, Pope John Paul II appointed Baker as bishop of Charleston. He was consecrated on September 28, 1999, by Archbishop John Donoghue at the North Charleston Coliseum in North Charleston, South Carolina. During his tenure as bishop, Baker dedicated new or expanded churches, schools, and parish facilities.

On January 26, 2007, the diocese reached a $5 million minimum settlement with sexual abuse victims and their family members.

=== Bishop of Birmingham ===
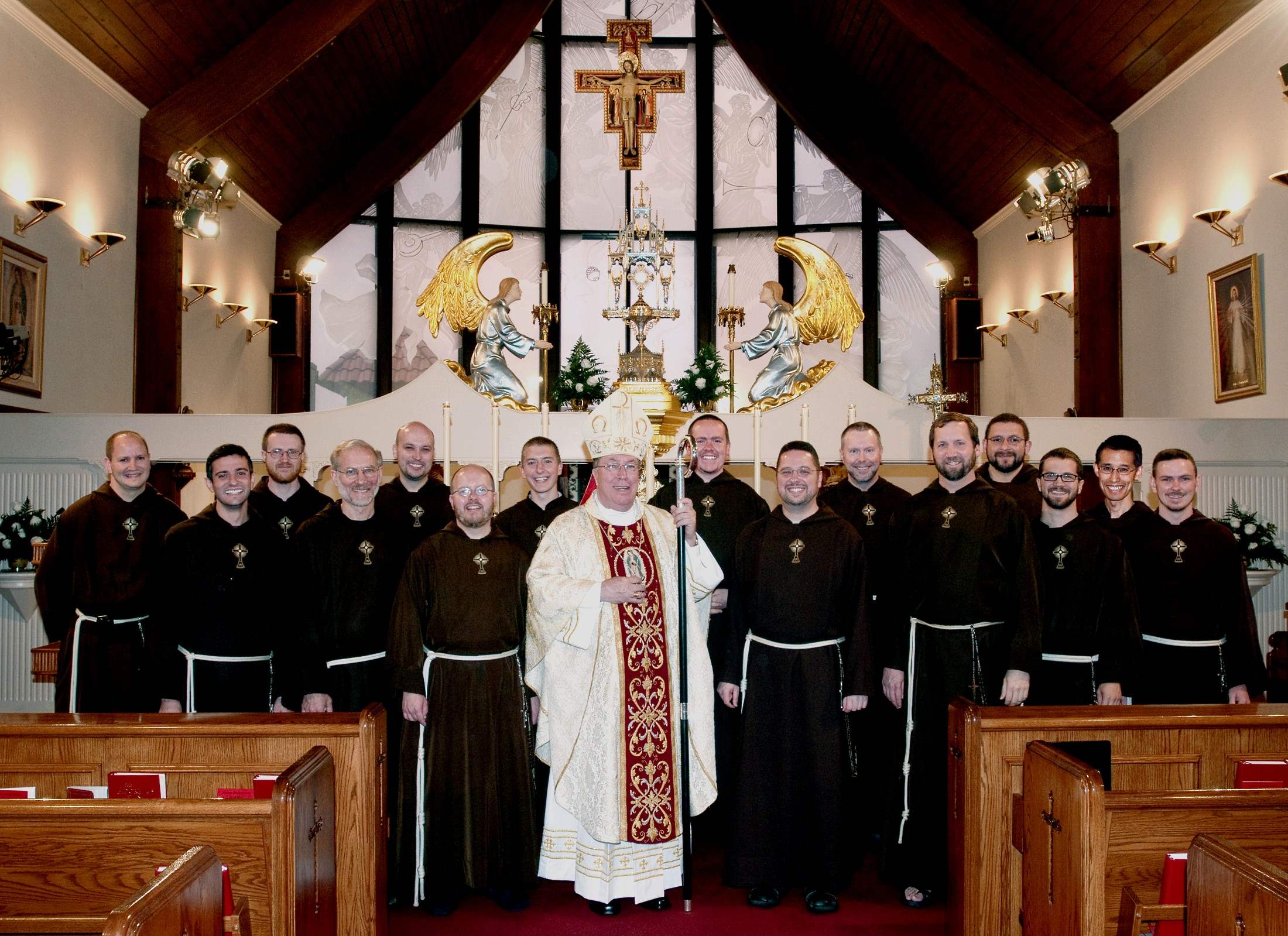
Baker with the Franciscan Missionaries of the Eternal Word in 2009.

On August 14, 2007, Pope Benedict XVI appointed Baker as bishop of Birmingham. He was installed as bishop on October 2, 2007. In 2019, Baker opened a eucharistic conference in the diocese.

On March 25, 2020, Pope Francis accepted Baker's resignation as bishop of Birmingham.

== Positions ==
=== Abortion ===
Baker was critical of Notre Dame University's decision to grant an honorary doctorate to US President Barack Obama in 2009, since Obama supported abortion rights. Baker suggested that Catholics assemble and pray on the Notre Dame commencement day; he discouraged public demonstrations, however.

=== Sexual abuse among clergy ===
In a 2020 interview with the Catholic World Report, Baker gave his opinion on the cause of the sexual abuse scandals in the Catholic Church:

I agree with Pope Benedict XVI that the origins of the scandals we’re experiencing are related to the changing sexual mores in society that we really began to see in the 1960s. The 1969 music festival at Woodstock, New York symbolized the change in American culture. Moral values in our country, and in the Western hemisphere, had changed. The drug culture came with it.

== Bibliography ==
- When Did We See You, Lord? Baker, Robert J. and Groeschel, C.F.R., Benedict J., Our Sunday Visitor, Inc. (Huntington, Indiana), 2005.
- The Redemption of Our Bodies: The Theology of the Body and Its Consequences for Ministry in the Diocese of Charleston, pastoral letter by Baker, Robert J.
- Cacique: A Novel of Florida’s Heroic Mission History, Baker, Robert J. and Sands, Tony, Saint Catherine of Siena Press, 2006
- The Questioner’s Prayer, Our Sunday Visitor, Inc. (Huntington, Indiana), 2007

== See also ==
- Catholic Church hierarchy
- Catholic Church in the United States
- Historical list of the Catholic bishops of the United States
- List of Catholic bishops of the United States
- Lists of patriarchs, archbishops, and bishops

== Episcopal succession ==
Catholic Church titles
Preceded by David Edward Foley	Bishop of Birmingham; 2007–2020	Succeeded by Steven J. Raica
Preceded by David B. Thompson	Bishop of Charleston; 1999–2007	Succeeded by Robert E. Guglielmone
