= Robert Finn (bishop) =

Catholic bishop

His Excellency, The Most Reverend Robert William Finn
- Bishop Emeritus of Kansas City-St. Joseph
- Archdiocese: St. Louis
- Diocese: Kansas City-St. Joseph
- Appointed: March 9, 2004 (Coadjutor)
- Installed: May 24, 2005
- Retired: April 21, 2015
- Predecessor: Raymond James Boland
- Successor: James Vann Johnston, Jr.

Orders
- Ordination: July 7, 1979 by John Nicholas Wurm
- Consecration: May 3, 2004 by Raymond Leo Burke, Raymond James Boland, and Joseph Fred Naumann

Personal details
- Born: Robert William Finn; April 2, 1953 (age 73) St. Louis, Missouri
- Denomination: Roman Catholic
- Education: Cardinal Glennon College; Angelicum University
- Motto: Latin: "Quaerite primum regnum dei" English: "Seek ye first the kingdom of God"

Styles of Robert William Finn
- Reference style: His Excellency; The Most Reverend
- Spoken style: Your Excellency
- Religious style: Bishop

Robert William Finn (born April 2, 1953) is an American bishop of the Roman Catholic Church. He served as bishop of the Diocese of Kansas City-Saint Joseph from 2005 until his forced resignation in 2015.

Finn is the only American bishop to be convicted of failure to report a priest suspected of child sex abuse to government authorities.

== Early life ==
Robert Finn was born in St. Louis, Missouri, on April 2, 1953, the second of five children of Theodore (Pat) and Betty Schneider Finn. He has three sisters— Kathleen Fornwalt, Patricia Bax, and Nancy Meyer —and one brother, Richard Finn.

Finn completed his elementary education at All Souls Catholic School in Overland, Missouri. He studied for the priesthood at archdiocesan seminaries and in Rome. He is a 1971 graduate of St. Louis Preparatory Seminary North, and received a Bachelor of Philosophy degree at Cardinal Glennon College in Shrewsbury, Missouri, in 1975. While a seminarian at the Pontifical North American College in Rome, Finn earned a Master of Theology degree in 1979 from the Angelicum University. Finn served as a deacon in 1978 to 1979 at Saint Charles Borromeo Parish in the Archdiocese of Westminster in London, England.

=== Priesthood ===
On July 7, 1979, Finn was ordained a priest by Bishop John Nicholas Wurm for the Archdiocese of Saint Louis at All Souls Parish Church in Overland, Missouri. After his ordination, Finn was named as associate pastor of two parishes in the archdiocese. He was later appointed to the faculty of Saint Francis Borgia Regional High School in Washington, Missouri, where he taught from 1983 to 1989. During those years, he lived in residence and served as part-time pastoral associate in area parishes.

In 1989, Finn received a Master of Education Administration degree from Saint Louis University in St. Louis, Missouri, and was appointed administrator of St. Dominic High School in O'Fallon, Missouri. During his tenure at St. Dominic's, he assisted the pastors of area parishes. He served the St. Dominic community until 1996.

In 1996, Finn was appointed director of Continuing Formation of Priests (CFP). In 1999, while continuing as CFP director, he was named editor of the St. Louis Review, the weekly newspaper of the archdiocese.

Finn was named by Pope John Paul II as a chaplain to his holiness in August 2003, upon the recommendation of the Archbishop Justin Rigali, Finn served in several other capacities including chairman of the archdiocesan Committee on the Diaconate. Finn served as pastor of Our Holy Redeemer Parish in Webster Groves, Missouri, prior to being appointed the coadjutor bishop of Kansas City.

=== Coadjutor Bishop and Bishop of Kansas City-Saint Joseph ===
On May 3, 2004, Finn was named by John Paul II as coadjutor bishop (with right of succession) of the Diocese of Kansas City-Saint Joseph. Finn was consecrated by Cardinal Raymond Burke at the Cathedral of the Immaculate Conception in Kansas City, Missouri. He also became a fourth degree member of the Knights of Columbus. On May 24, 2005, the Vatican accepted Bishop Raymond Boland's request for retirement. As coadjutor, Finn automatically succeeded Boland as sixth bishop of Kansas City-St. Joseph.

Finn became a member of the Priestly Society of the Holy Cross, which is linked to the Catholic personal prelature Opus Dei. In an interview with the Catholic Key, Finn told of how Opus Dei had helped open his heart to the work of the Holy Spirit.

Upon his arrival in the Diocese of Kansas City-Saint Joseph in 2005, Finn said that vocations to the priesthood and religious life would be 'super-priority' for his diocese. Before Finn's arrival, in the 2003/2004 seminary school year, the diocese reported having nine seminarians. For 2007/2008, the diocese reported that there were 24 men studying for diocesan priesthood.

In March 2006, Finn invited to his diocese a small order of Benedictine nuns, now titled Benedictines of Mary, Queen of Apostles. The entire order moved to Kansas City from its place of founding, Scranton, Pennsylvania.

In 2011, Finn was serving on the Administrative and the Priorities and Plans Committees for the United States Conference of Catholic Bishops, and had been chairman of the Task Force on the Life and Dignity of the Human Person.

=== Sex abuse scandal ===
In May 2011, Finn apologized for his failure to act in a more timely manner in the case of Reverend Shawn Ratigan, who was accused of engaging in inappropriate behavior with children. Finn had received a letter in May 2010 from a Catholic elementary school principal, reporting numerous instances of inappropriate behavior by Ratigan. Finn said he failed to read the letter. Finn's admission came five months after the diocese discovered inappropriate pictures of children on Ratigan's computer, and a week after he was arrested on child pornography charges.

On June 9, 2011, Finn appointed former U.S. Attorney Todd P. Graves to conduct an independent investigation of diocesan policies and procedures used to address sexual misconduct by church personnel, including Ratigan. Finn also announced the appointment of an independent public liaison and ombudsman. In a September 2011 report, Graves said "that Diocesan leaders failed to follow their own policies and procedures for responding to reports" of sexual abuse by clergy.

On October 14, 2011, a county grand jury indicted both the diocese and Finn with failing to inform police about child pornography, a criminal misdemeanor. According to the indictment, the diocese became aware of those images on December 16, 2010. Rather than reporting it to law enforcement, Finn ordered Ratigan to undergo psychiatric evaluation, then sent him to a convent under orders to have no contact with children. During that time, Ratigan proceeded to take more inappropriate pictures of children he met through church contacts. Without Finn's approval, other diocesan officials finally reported Ratigan to police on May 11, 2011. Ratigan eventually pleaded guilty to five counts of producing child pornography and was sentenced to 50 years in federal prison.

While other bishops had been charged with directly perpetrating abuse, Finn was the first American bishop to be charged in his role as a supervisor of priests, the first criminal case against a sitting bishop in the child sex abuse scandal in the American Catholic Church. Finn was convicted on one charge in September 2012 and sentenced to two years of probation. All charges against the diocese itself were dropped.

In September 2014, the Vatican initiated an apostolic visitation to the diocese, conducted by Archbishop Terrence Prendergast. Cardinal Sean O'Malley from the Archdiocese of Boston criticized Finn's actions in a November 2014 interview with the television news program 60 Minutes. O'Malley said that Finn's conviction for failing to report suspected child abuse would disqualify him from teaching Sunday school in the Archdiocese of Boston. "It's a question that the Holy See needs to address urgently," O'Malley said.

=== Resignation ===
On April 21, 2015, the Vatican announced that Finn had resigned as bishop of Kansas City-St. Joseph without providing any reason. In 2016, Finn became chaplain of the School Sisters of Christ the King Convent in Lincoln, Nebraska. As of July 2018, he had largely limited himself to this role, but has made occasional public appearances.

== Views ==
=== Tridentine mass ===
In August 2005, Finn encouraged use of the Tridentine mass in his diocese. This was in accord with indult provisions established during Pope John Paul II's tenure. Finn also welcomed the Institute of Christ the King Sovereign Priest to the diocese to celebrate mass at St. Patrick's Oratory, the oldest church in Kansas City, Missouri.

=== Abortion ===
In a pastoral letter published in the October 24, 2008, issue of the diocesan newspaper, The Catholic Key, Finn referenced the upcoming 2008 US presidential election:

"Our Catholic moral principles teach that a candidate’s promise of economic prosperity is insufficient to justify their constant support of abortion laws, including partial-birth abortion, and infanticide for born-alive infants. Promotion of the Freedom of Choice Act is a pledge to eliminate every single limit on abortions achieved over the last thirty-five years. The real freedom that is ours in Jesus Christ compels us, not to take life, but to defend it."

Catholic Church titles
Preceded by Raymond James Boland	Bishop of Kansas City-St. Joseph; 2005–2015	Succeeded by James Vann Johnston, Jr.
