= Holy Spirit Catholic School =

Location
- 601 James I. Harrison Jr. Pkwy East; Tuscaloosa, Tuscaloosa County, Alabama 35405; United States; 33°10′26″N 87°31′39″W

Information
- Type: Private
- Motto: "Be in that number"
- Religious affiliation: Roman Catholic Church
- Established: 1963
- School district: Diocese of Birmingham
- Principal: Jonathan Loper (Middle & High School) Matthew Ogonowski (Preschool & Elementary School)
- Faculty: 63
- Grades: Pre-K-12
- Age range: 3-18
- Enrollment: 492
- Student to teacher ratio: 10:1
- Colors: Scarlet red, black and white
- Athletics: Alabama High School Athletic Association (Single A Private)
- Mascot: Saints
- Team name: Holy Spirit Saints
- Rivals: American Christian Academy, Tuscaloosa Academy
- Accreditation: Southern Association of Colleges and Schools
- Yearbook: Spiritus
- Affiliation: National Catholic Educational Association
- Website: www.holyspirit-al.com

Holy Spirit Catholic High School is a private Catholic K-12 school in Tuscaloosa, Alabama, United States. It is located within the [[Diocese of Birmingham]].

== Background ==
Catholic education in Tuscaloosa started in 1866 at St John the Baptist Catholic Church. Bishop Thomas J. Toolen of the Diocese of Mobile approved plans to build a new church and school and in anticipation of the new school Father J.J Cassidy closed St. John's School in 1961. Holy Spirit Catholic Church and School were built and officially dedicated by Bishop Toolen on January 27, 1963. The original school had grades 1-8 and was staffed by the Benedictine Sisters of Cullman Alabama. In 1979, a kindergarten class was added along with additional classrooms, a gymnasium and a cafeteria. In 1986, under the leadership of Father John Fallon, funds were secured to add a preschool which was opened in 1987. In 1995, a new high school class was made available under the direction of Mr. Michael Burke, principal. In January 1996, the building was dedicated by Rev. Bishop David Foley. The first graduation of Holy Spirit Catholic High School was held in May 1999.

== Athletics ==
Holy Spirit offers volleyball, football, cross country, basketball, softball, baseball, track and field, cheerleading, soccer, golf, and tennis.

Eight team state championships have been won in the AHSAA:

- Volleyball (1999, 2000)
- Baseball (2003)
- Men's soccer (2005)
- Women's soccer (2016)
- Softball (2022)
- Track and field (2022, 2026)

== Awards ==
Holy Spirit Catholic School has been the recipient of multiple awards by Niche.

- The Best Private High School in Tuscaloosa County.
- The Best Private K-12 School in Tuscaloosa County.
- The Best High School for STEM in Tuscaloosa County.
