= St. Mary of the Visitation Catholic Church (Huntsville, Alabama) =

Historic church in Alabama, United States

- Church of the Visitation
- U.S. National Register of Historic Places
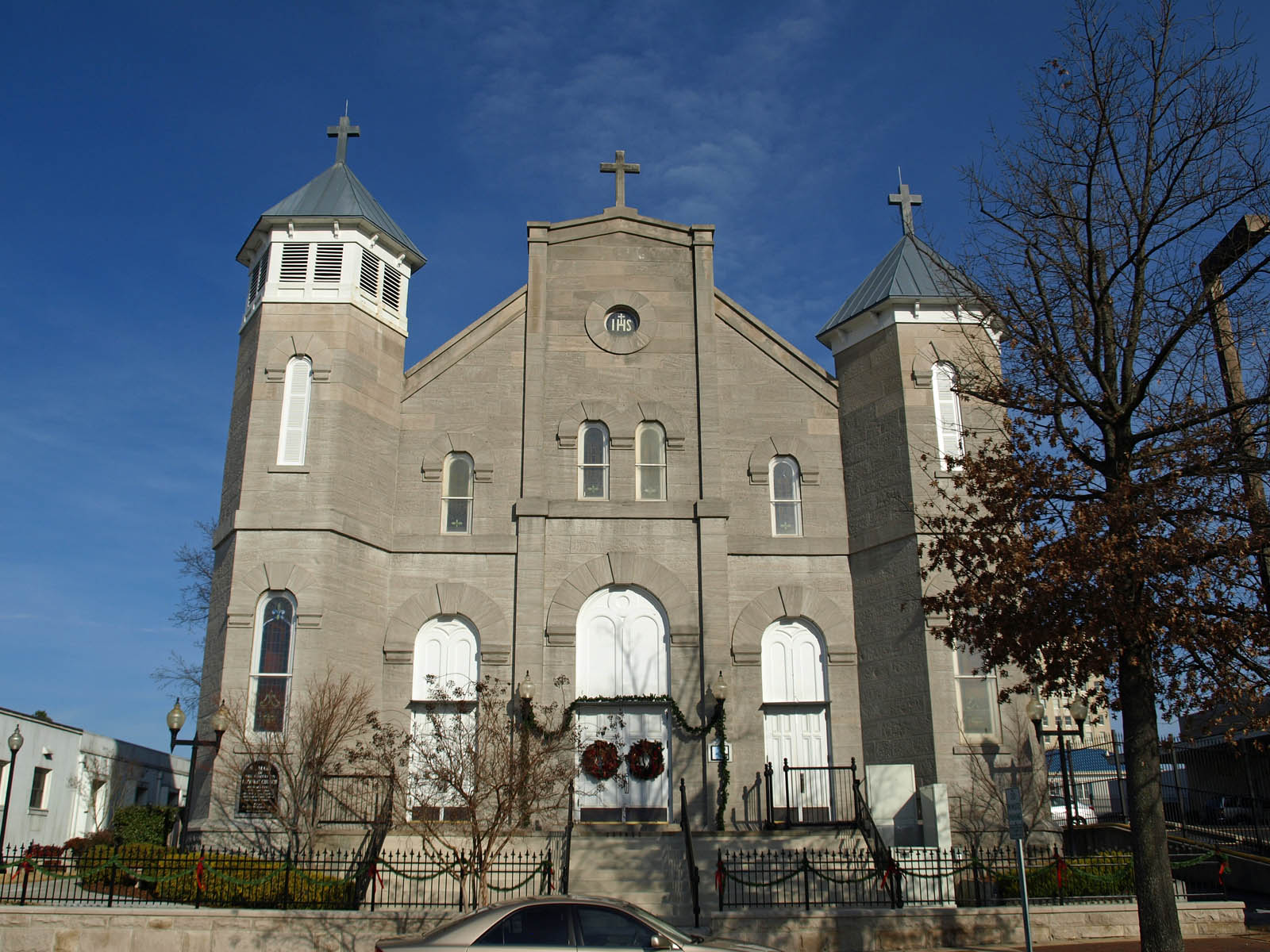
- The church in December 2009

- Location within Huntsville, Alabama Location within Alabama Location within the United States
- Location: 222 N. Jefferson St., Huntsville, Alabama
- Coordinates: 34°43′58″N 86°35′14″W
- Area: 2 acres (0.81 ha)
- Built: 1877
- Architectural style: Romanesque
- MPS: Downtown Huntsville MRA
- NRHP reference No.: 80000705
- Added to NRHP: September 22, 1980

St. Mary of the Visitation Catholic Church is a historic church in Huntsville, Alabama and is the oldest Catholic church in North Alabama. It began construction in 1861 but was interrupted by the Civil War. The church was completed in 1877. It was listed on the National Register of Historic Places in 1980.

== Description ==
St. Mary Church was built of limestone in a Romanesque Revival style. The façade is framed by two hexagonal towers; the spire of the north tower houses the bell, and is raised six feet (1.8 meters) above the south tower. The large central double entrance doors and smaller flanking doors are topped by an arched wooden infill panel. All openings on the façade are topped with projecting round stone arches, with the keystones and imposts projecting further. A stone belt course runs half-way up the front. Pilasters climb between the central and side doors and terminate about 5 feet (1.5 m) above the gable roof in a shallow gable wall. Crosses adorn this wall and the two towers. A semi-hexagonal apse is a later addition to the rear of the building. The church was listed on the National Register of Historic Places in 1980.
