= David Edward Foley =

American Roman Catholic prelate (1930–2018)

His Excellency, The Most Reverend David Edward Foley
- Bishop of Birmingham
- Diocese: Diocese of Birmingham
- Appointed: March 22, 1994
- Installed: May 13, 1994
- Term ended: May 10, 2005
- Predecessor: Raymond James Boland
- Successor: Robert Joseph Baker
- Previous post: Auxiliary Bishop of Richmond (1986 to 1994)

Orders
- Ordination: May 26, 1956 by Patrick O’Boyle
- Consecration: June 27, 1986 by Walter Francis Sullivan, John Francis Donoghue, and James Aloysius Hickey

Personal details
- Born: February 3, 1930 Worcester, Massachusetts, U.S.
- Died: April 17, 2018 (aged 88) Birmingham, Alabama, U.S.

Styles of David Edward Foley
- Reference style: His Excellency; The Most Reverend
- Spoken style: Your Excellency
- Religious style: Bishop

David Edward Foley (February 3, 1930 – April 17, 2018) was an American prelate of the Roman Catholic Church who served as the third bishop of the Diocese of Birmingham in Alabama from 1994 to 2005. He previously served as an auxiliary bishop of the Diocese of Richmond in Virginia from 1986 to 1994.

== Biography ==
=== Early life ===
David Foley was born in Worcester, Massachusetts, on February 3, 1930. He was ordained a priest for the Archdiocese of Washington on May 26, 1956 at the Cathedral of Saint Matthew the Apostle in Washington D.C. by Archbishop Patrick O’Boyle.

=== Auxiliary Bishop of Richmond ===
Foley was appointed by Pope John Paul II as an auxiliary bishop of Richmond on May 3, 1986. Foley was consecrated at the Cathedral of the Sacred Heart in Richmond, Virginia, on June 27, 1986, by Bishop Walter Sullivan.

=== Bishop of Birmingham ===
John Paul II appointed Foley as the third bishop of Birmingham in Birmingham, Alabama, on March 22, 1994. He was installed on May 13, 1994. In 1999, Foley issued a decree prohibiting priests in his diocese, under most circumstances, from celebrating mass in the ad orientem position. Though the decree never specifically mentioned the Catholic television network EWTN, which has its major studios in the diocese, observers agreed that it was directed at Mother Angelica's network.

=== Retirement and death ===
On May 10, 2005, Pope Benedict XVI accepted Foley's resignation as bishop of Birmingham. He was elected diocesan administrator on May 19, 2005. David Foley died on April 17, 2018, in Birmingham at age 88.

Catholic Church titles
Preceded by Raymond James Boland	Bishop of Birmingham; 1994–2005	Succeeded by Robert Joseph Baker
Preceded by -	Auxiliary Bishop of Richmond; 1986–1994	Succeeded by -
