= Cathedral of Saint Paul (Alabama) =

Catholic cathedral in Alabama, US

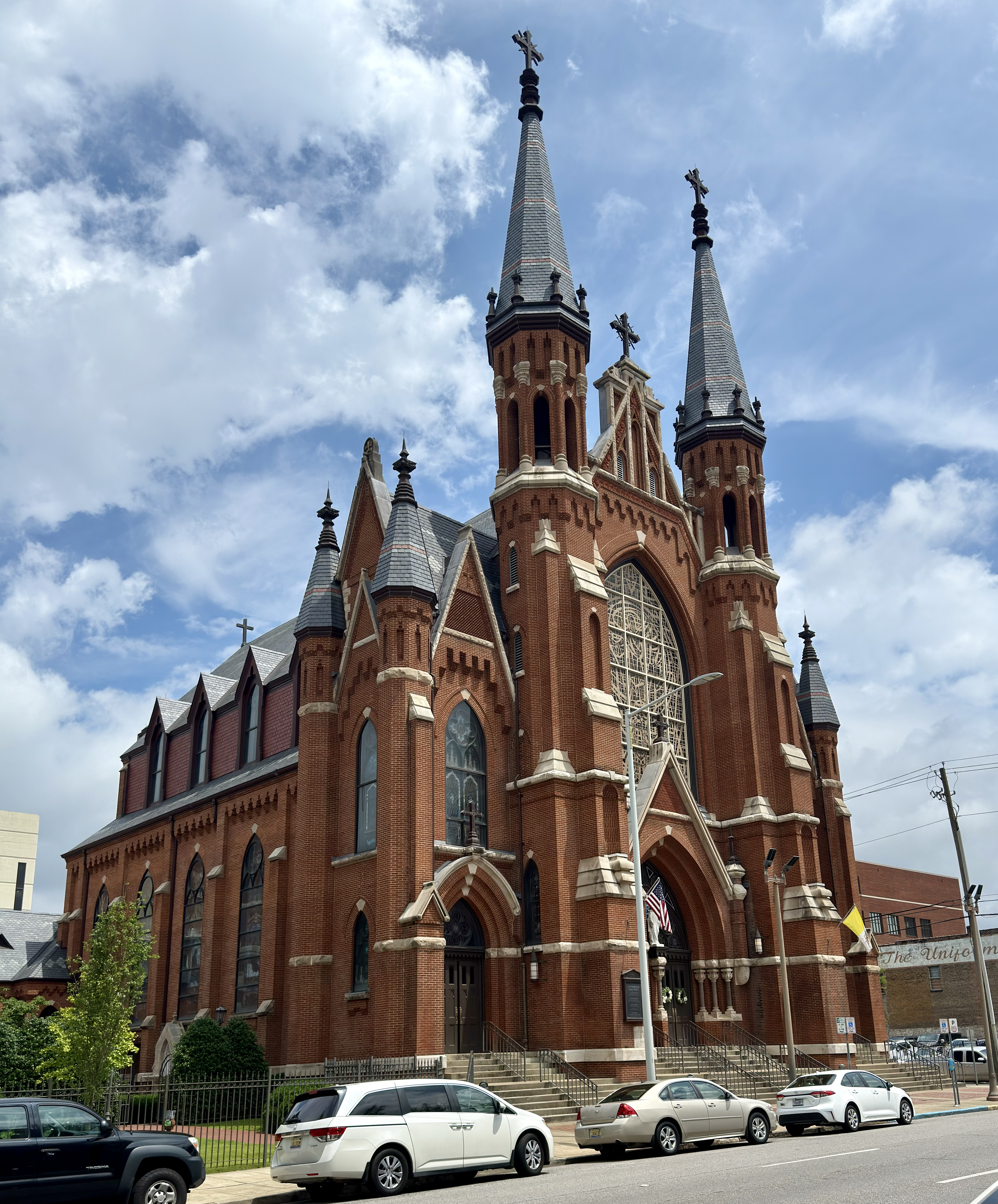
- Cathedral of Saint Paul in 2025
- Cathedral of Saint Paul
- 33°31′4.05″N 86°48′16.54″W
- Location: 2120 Third Avenue North; Birmingham, Alabama
- Country: United States
- Denomination: Catholic Church
- Sui iuris church: Latin Church
- Website: www.stpaulsbhm.org

Architecture
- Architect: Adolphus Druiding
- Style: Neo-Gothic
- Completed: 1893
- Construction cost: $90,000

Specifications
- Materials: Brick

Administration
- Diocese: Diocese of Birmingham in Alabama

Clergy
- Bishop: Steven J. Raica
- Rector: Very Rev. Bryan W. Jerabek
- St. Paul's Catholic Church
- U.S. National Register of Historic Places
- Area: 1.4 acres (0.57 ha)
- NRHP reference No.: 82001607
- Added to NRHP: December 27, 1982

The Cathedral of Saint Paul — informally known as Saint Paul's Cathedral — is the mother church of the Catholic Diocese of Birmingham in Alabama in Birmingham, Alabama, in the United States.

Designed by Chicago architect Adolphus Druiding, the Victorian Gothic-style brick building was completed as a parish church in 1893. Its parish was established in 1872. It was elevated to cathedral status with the creation of the Diocese of Birmingham in Alabama in 1969.

== History ==
=== St. Paul's Church ===
During the first seven decades of the 19th century, the Catholics in Birmingham were under the jurisdiction of the Diocese of Mobile. In 1872, these Catholic built a small wood-framed church. The diocese in 1880 sent John Browne to serve as the first resident pastor of St. Paul's Church. The parish enlarged the church and constructed a rectory.

The second pastor, Patrick O’Reilly, laid the cornerstone for a new St. Paul's Church in 1890 next to the existing church. He hired the architect Adolphus Druiding of Chicago to design the new church. The new St. Paul's Church was dedicated in November 30, 1893, costing approximately $90,000. In 1904, the diocese named James Coyle as pastor of St. Paul. With the growth of the steel mills in Birmingham, many Catholic immigrants began moving into the city. During the 1910s, Coyle dealt with anti-Catholic sentiment raised by the Ku Klux Klan. In 1921, a Klansman shot Coyle to death several hours after Coyle married the man's daughter to a Puerto Rican man.

=== Co-Cathedral of St. Paul ===
Pope Pius XII in 1954 suppressed the Diocese of Mobile, replacing it with the Diocese of Mobile-Birmingham. He designated St. Paul's Church as the Co-Cathedral of Saint Paul. The diocese in 1954 completed the first renovation of the co-cathedral, adding air conditioning and making other repairs.

=== Cathedral of St. Paul ===
In 1969, Pope Paul VI split the Diocese of Mobile-Birmingham, erecting the Archdiocese of Mobile and the Diocese of Birmingham in Alabama. The Co-Cathedral of St. Paul now became the Cathedral of St. Paul. The diocese in 1972 made structural repairs on the cathedral and made changes within the sanctuary.The large window of St. Paul over the entrance was installed, replacing an older window damaged in a storm. In 1982, the Cathedral of St. Paul and its school building were added to the National Register of Historic Places.

In 2010, leaks were observed in the plaster ceiling of the cathedral. After inspecting the slate roof, contractors determined that it needed replacement, along with its finials and copper crosses. At this time, the diocese also upgraded the electrical and lighting systems. The project was completed in 2015. In 2011, some scenes from the film October Baby were shot in the cathedral sanctuary.

The cathedral floors were refinished and the pews replaced in 2019. The diocese in 2021 replaced the cathedral pipe organ. In 2023, a major renovation of the rectory building commenced.

== Cathedral exterior ==
The Cathedral of St. Paul is a Neo-Gothic style building with red brick and white limestone walls. The cathedral courtyard contains an outdoor altar depicting the death of St. Joseph.

== Cathedral interior ==
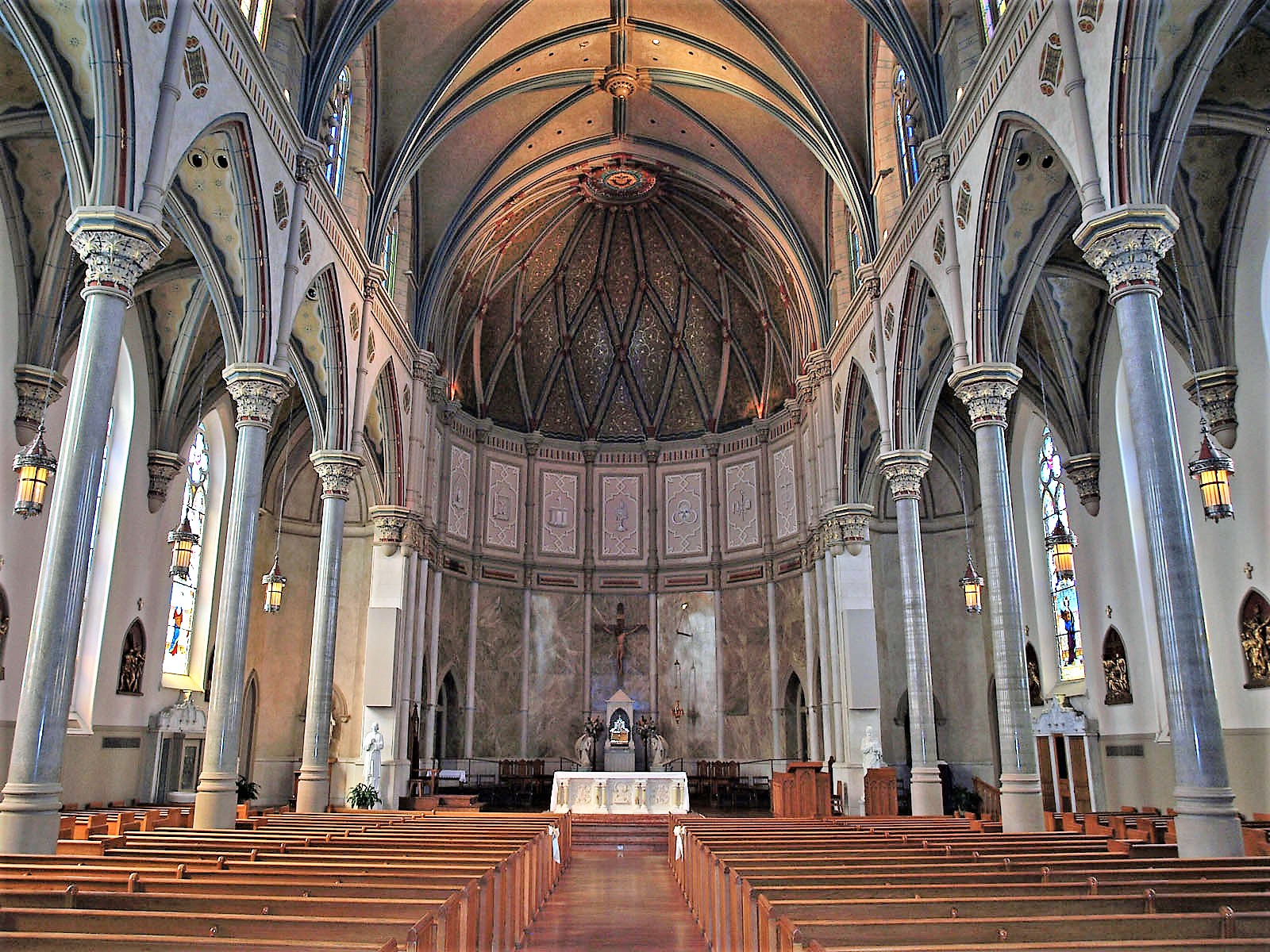
Nave (2011)

=== Nave ===
The nave of the Cathedral of St. Paul contains two confessionals and displays the 14 Stations of the Cross on its walls. Ten solid granite columns support the vaults and arches. The stained-glass windows in the aisles are the work of G. C. Riordan & Company of Cincinnati. The nave contains the following statues:

- Blessed Mother – a title of the Virgin Mary
- St. Joseph – the husband of the Virgin Mary
- John Vianney – a 19th century French priest and saint
- Apostle Paul – a Roman missionary and saint of the 1st century CE
- Anthony of Padua – a 12th century Portuguese priest who is a saint and doctor of the church

=== Sanctuary ===
The cathedral sanctuary contains an altar constructed of carrara marble with Mexican onyx column accents that was installed in the 1910s. It displays a bas relief of the Lamb of God seated on the Book with Seven Seals. The reliquary inside the altar contains the relics of three martyrs

- Placidus – a 3rd century CE martyr
- Theodorus – a 4th century martyr
- Tarcisius – a 4th century CE Roman martyr

=== Pipe organ ===
The Anna Catharine Grace Memorial Pipe Organ was installed in 2022. It was manufactured by the Noack Organ Company of Georgetown, Massachusetts. It is an opus 164 pipe organ.

Cathedral campus images

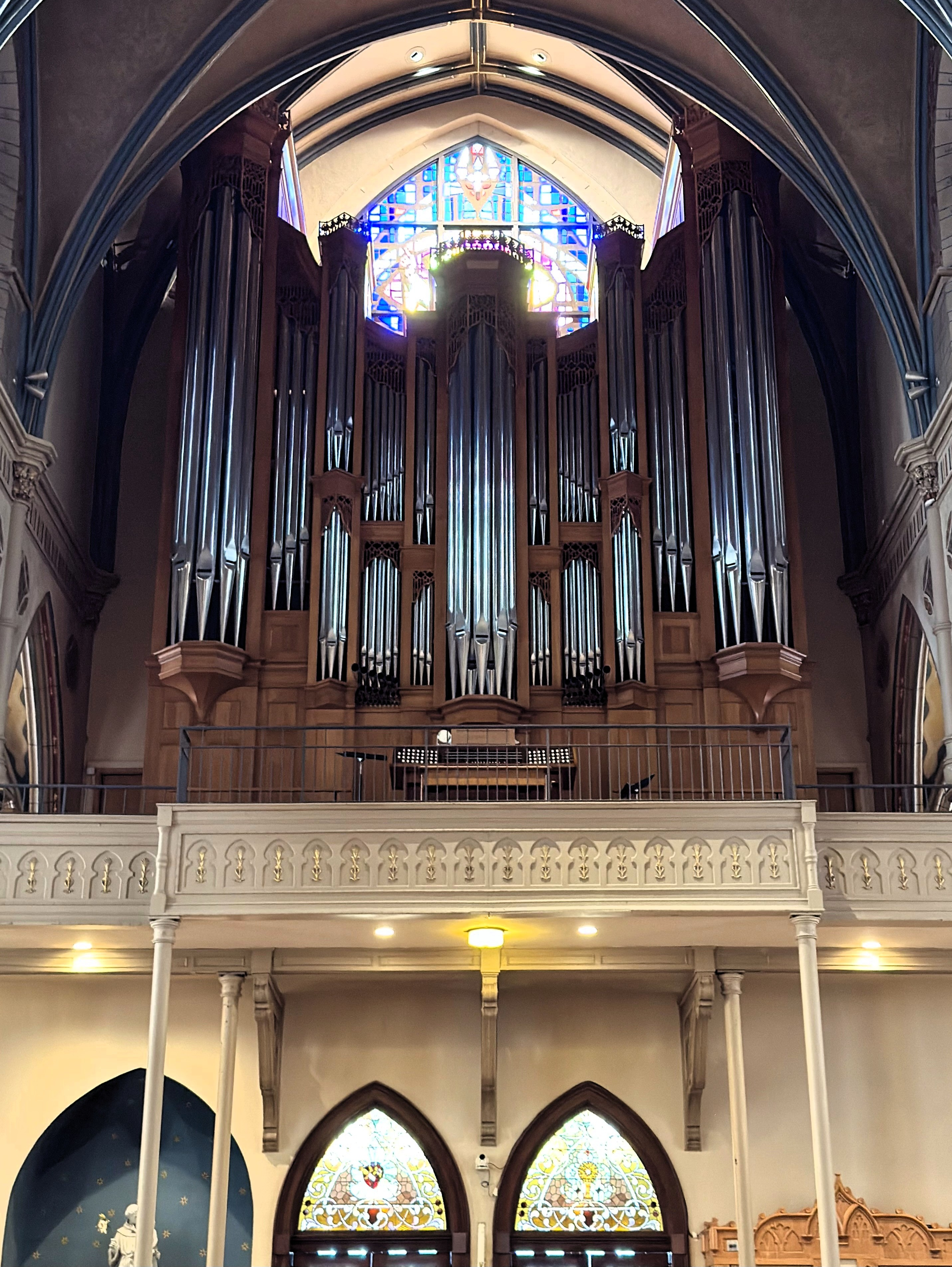
Pipe organ (2025)

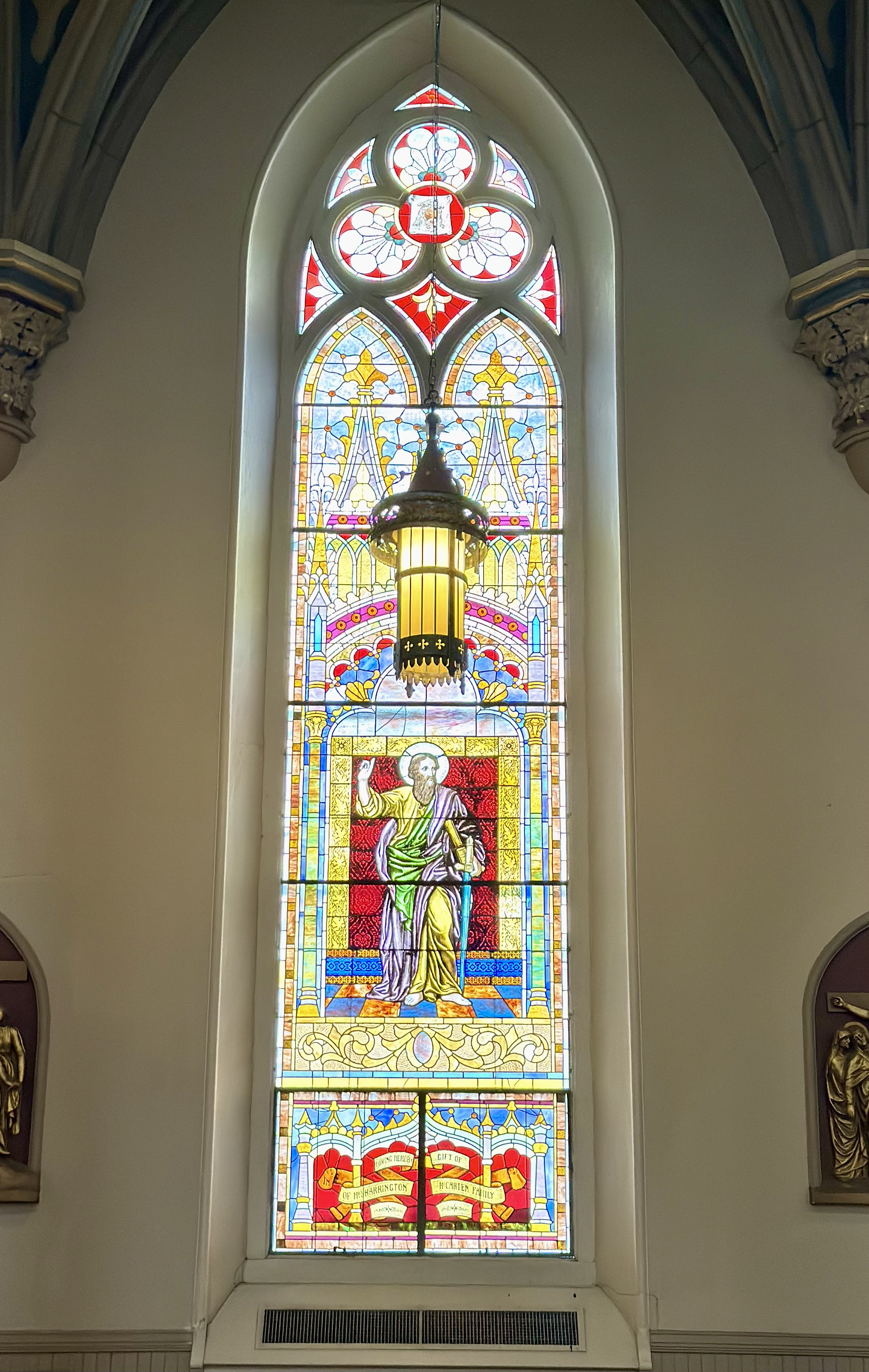
St. Paul stained glass window (2025)

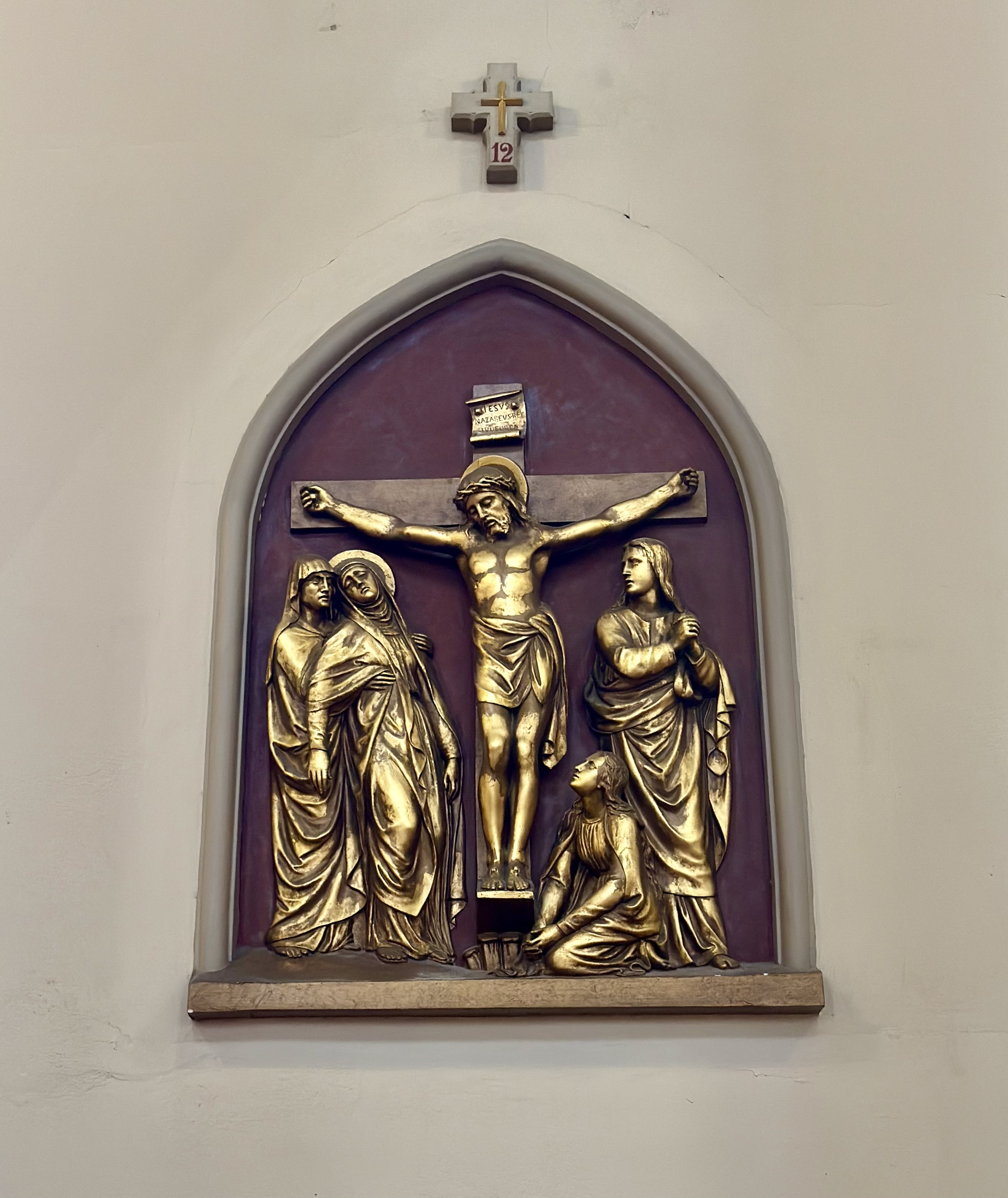
Station of the Cross in cathedral (2025)

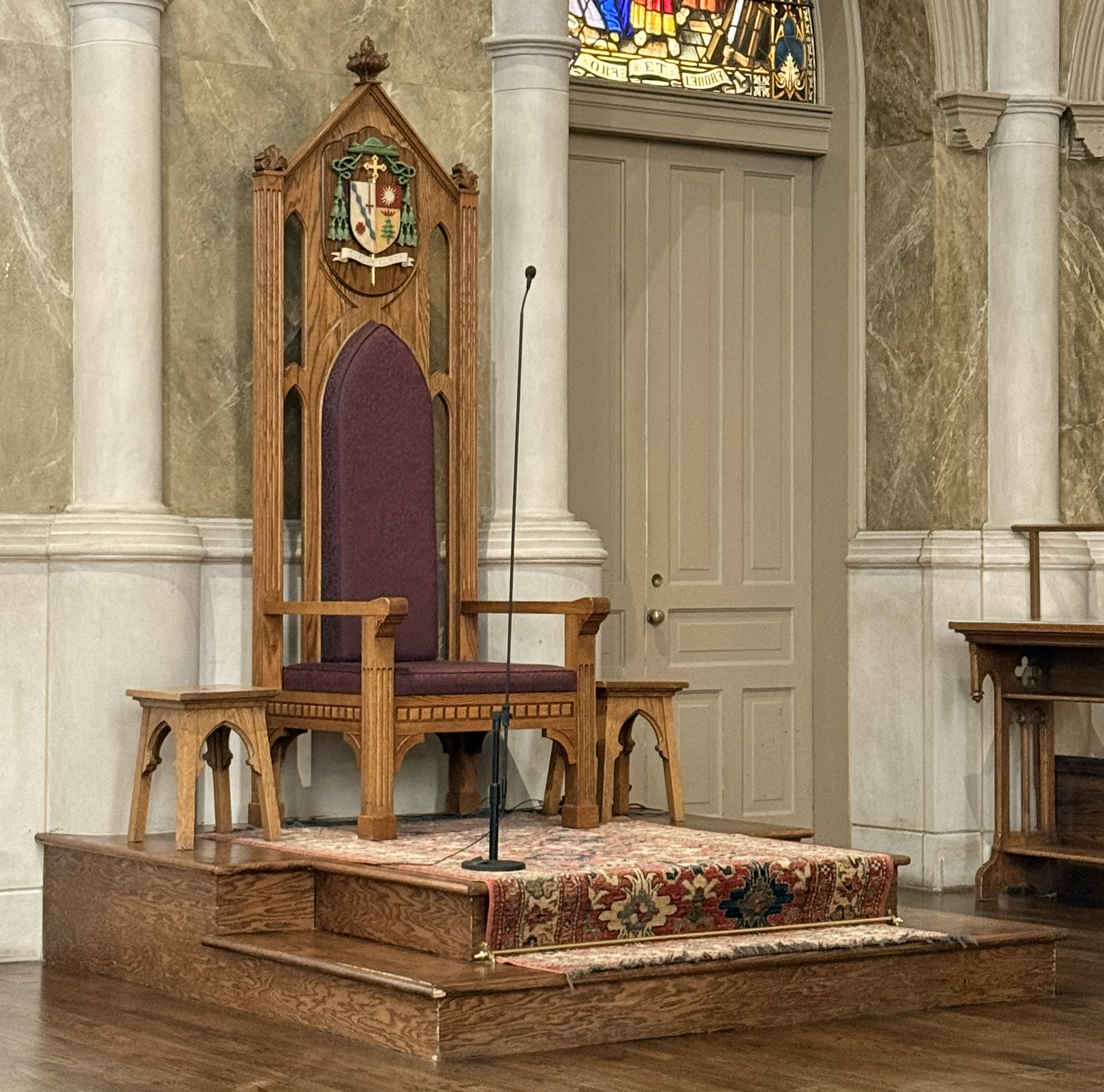
Cathedra (2025)

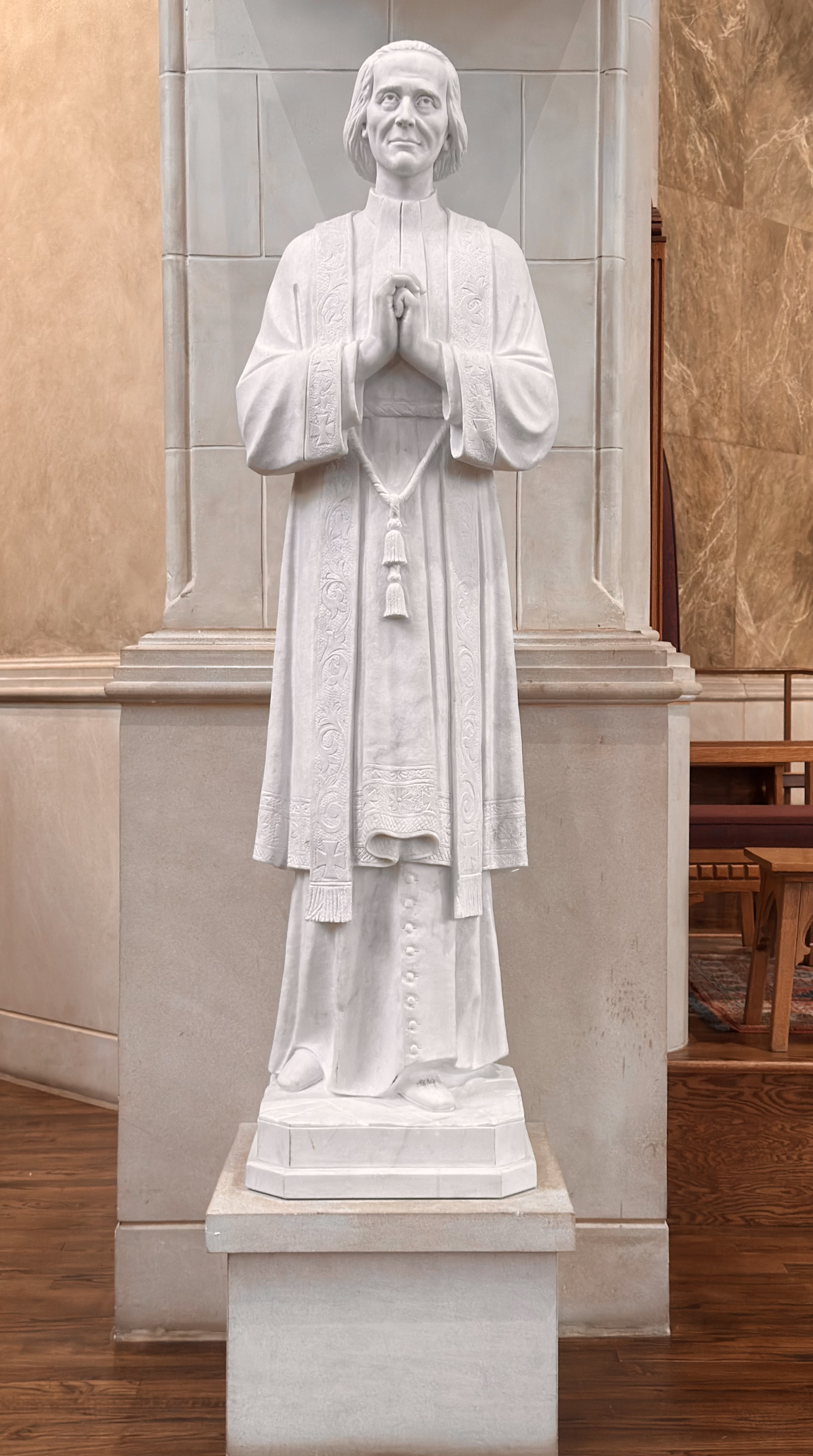
statue of John Vianney in cathedral (2025

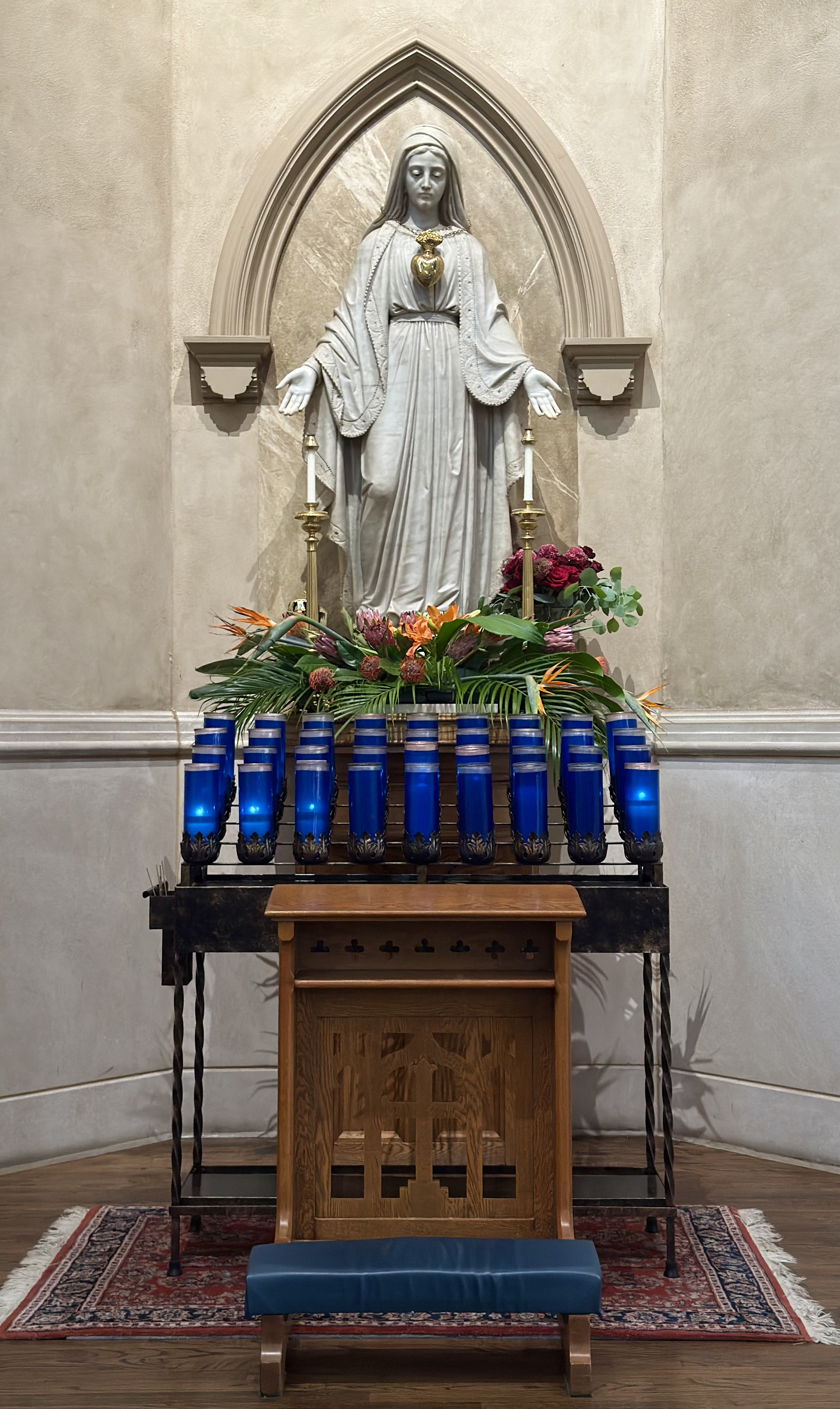
Shrine of the Virgin Mary in Cathedral (2025)

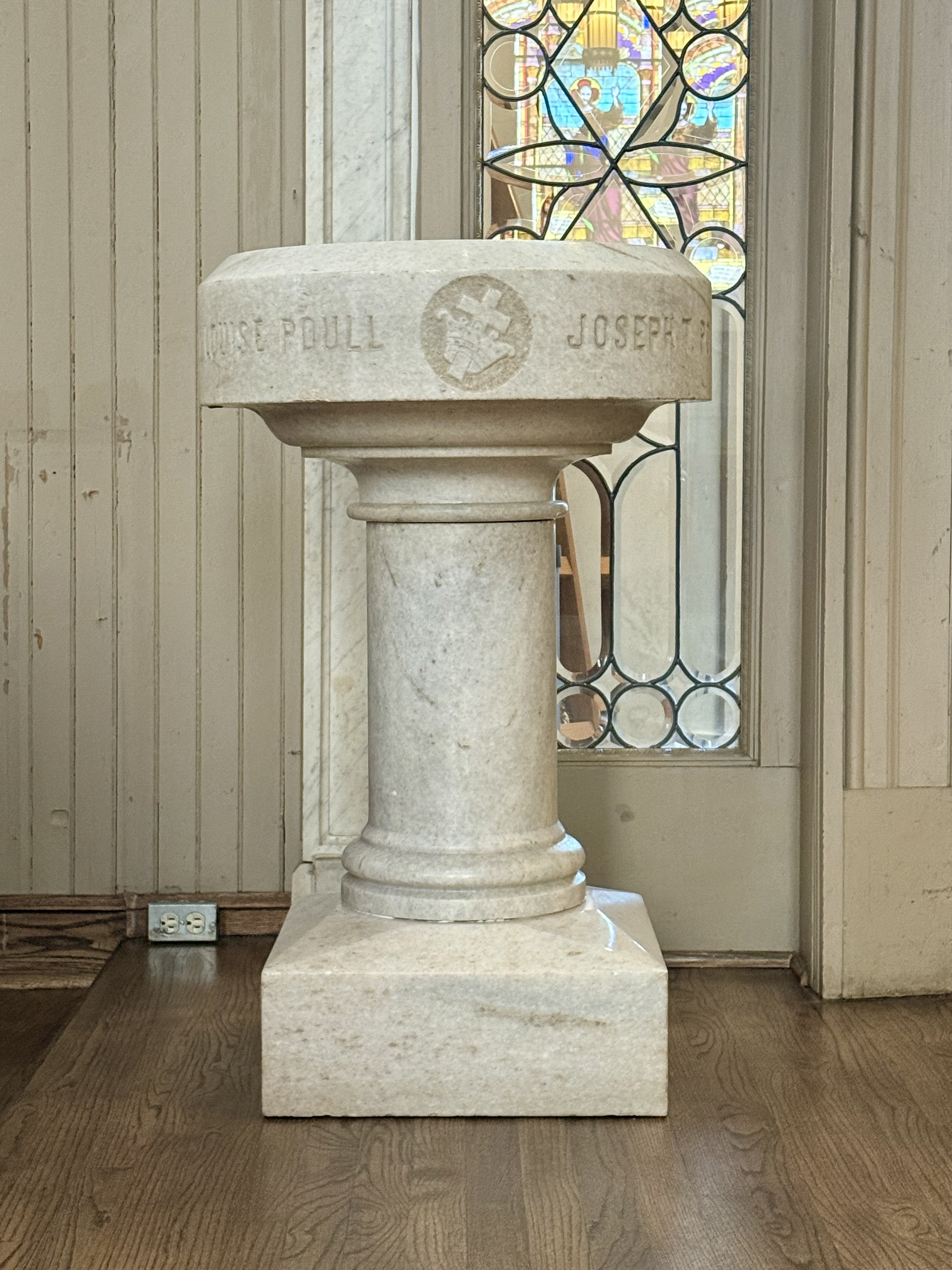
Holy water stoup (2025)

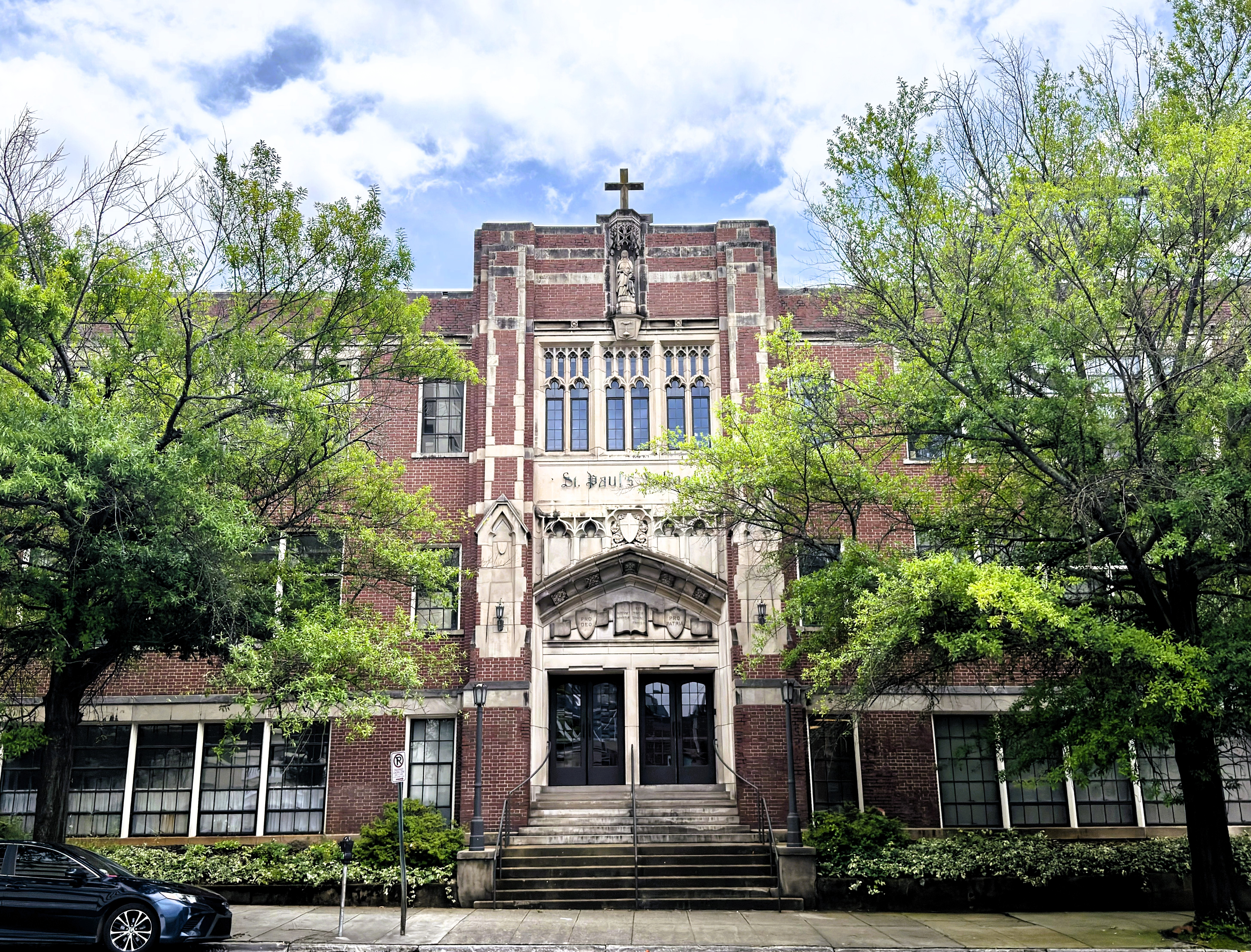
School building (2025)

== Pastors and rectors ==
The following priests have served as pastors of St. Paul's Church or as rectors of the Cathedral of St. Paul.

=== Pastors ===
1. John J. Browne, 1880–1886
2. Patrick A. O‘Reilly, 1888–1904
3. James E. Coyle, 1904–1921
4. William A. Kerrigan, 1922–1935
5. Eugene L. Sands, 1936–1949
6. Francis J. Foley, 1951–1953

=== Rectors ===
1. Francis J. McCormack, 1953–1967
2. George W. Keyes, 1967–1971
3. John M. Horgan, 1971–1979
4. J. Peter Sheehan, 1979–1991
5. Patrick P. Cullen, 1991–2001
6. Richard Donohoe, 2001–2009
7. Kevin Bazzel, 2009–2016
8. Bryan W. Jerabek, 2016 – present

== See also ==
- List of Catholic cathedrals in the United States
- List of cathedrals in the United States
- St Paul's Church, Birmingham (UK)
