= Diocese of Birmingham in Alabama =

Latin Catholic jurisdiction in the US

Coordinates: 33°39′12″N 86°48′32″W

Diocese of Birmingham in Alabama Dioecesis Birminghamiensis
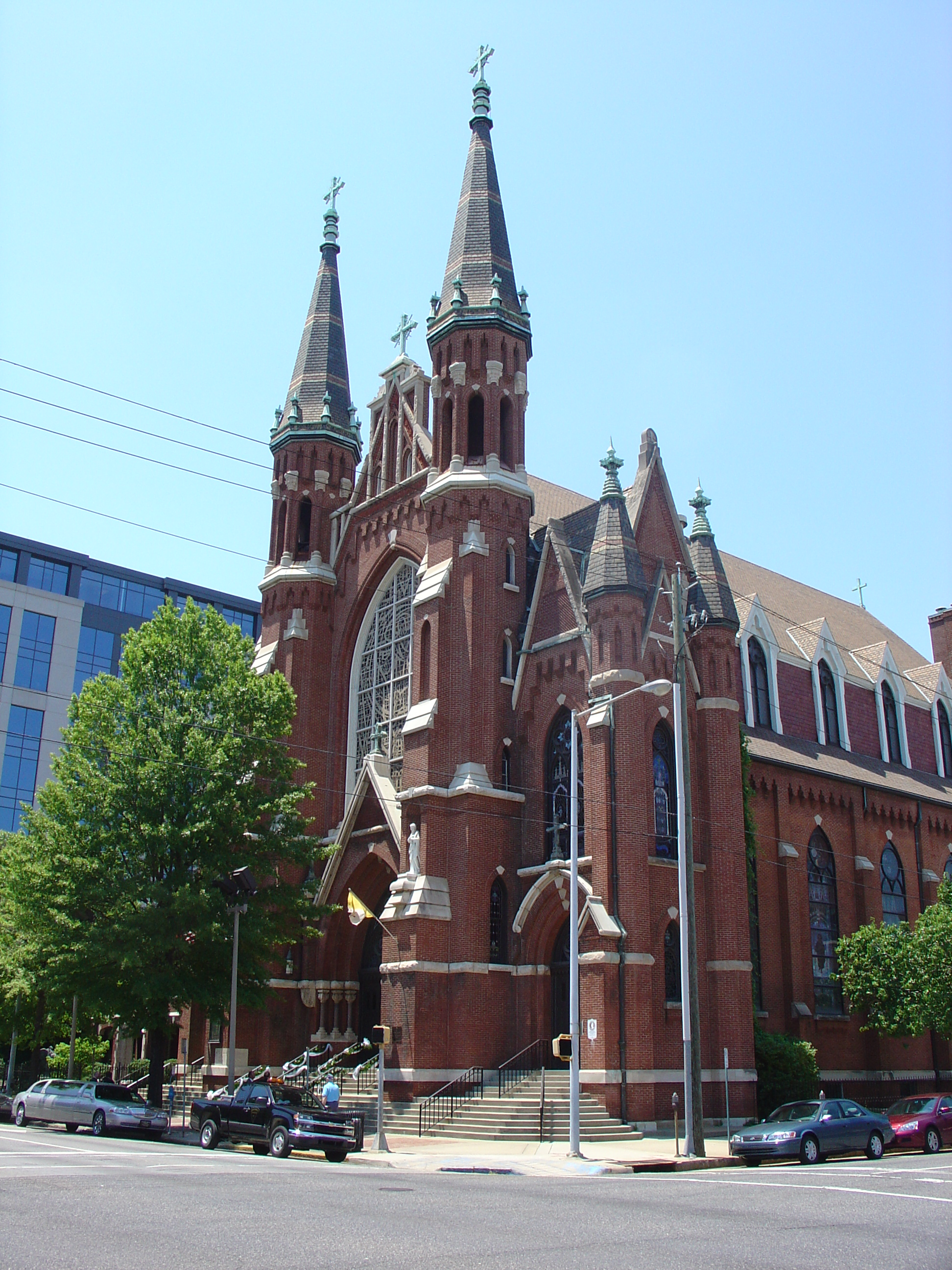
- Cathedral of St. Paul

- Coat of arms

Location
- Country: United States
- Territory: Northern Alabama
- Ecclesiastical province: Mobile

Statistics
- Area: 28,091 sq mi (72,760 km^{2})
- Population: Total; Catholics: (as of 2023); 3,187,797; 113,241 (3.5%)
- Parishes: 54

Information
- Denomination: Catholic Church
- Sui iuris church: Latin Church
- Rite: Roman Rite
- Established: 28 June 1969 (split from Diocese of Mobile-Birmingham)
- Cathedral: Cathedral of Saint Paul
- Patron saint: Saint Paul

Current leadership
- Pope: Leo XIV
- Bishop: Steven John Raica
- Metropolitan Archbishop: Thomas John Rodi
- Bishops emeritus: Robert Joseph Baker

Map
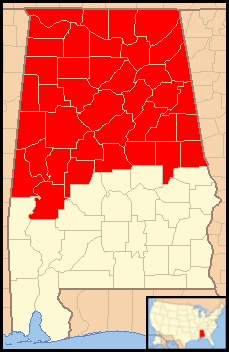

Website
- bhmdiocese.org

The Diocese of Birmingham in Alabama is a diocese of the Catholic Church in northern Alabama in the United States. It was erected in 1969, being a suffragan diocese in the ecclesiastical province of the metropolitan Archdiocese of Mobile. The Cathedral of Saint Paul in Birmingham serves as the mother church. EWTN, a major Catholic media enterprise, is located in the diocese.

== History ==
=== 1700 to 1800 ===
In 1703, the French founded Fort Louis de la Louisiana in what is today Mobile. They created a chapel at the fort, the first Catholic church in present-day Alabama. That next year, Henri Roulleaux De la Vente became the first resident priest in the new settlement, under the authority of the Diocese of Quebec in New France.

During the 18th century, the French in Mobile were frequently in conflict with the British, who had gained control of northern areas of Alabama. With the end of the French and Indian War in 1763, the British took control of the French colonies east of the Mississippi River, including Mobile.

After taking control of Alabama, the British mandated that the French Catholic landowners in the province swear allegiance to the Church of England. As a result, most of them migrated to New Orleans, then held by Catholic Spain. In 1790, during the American Revolution, the Spanish took Mobile from the British. In 1793, the Vatican erected the Diocese of Louisiana and the Two Floridas, centered in New Orleans, to serve Catholics in the Spanish colonies, including coastal Alabama.

=== 1800 to 1900 ===
In 1813, during the War of 1812, American forces captured Mobile from the Spanish. Eight years later, Spain sold all of their remaining American colonies to the United States. In 1819, the first Catholic mass was celebrated in Tuscaloosa. Pope Leo XII erected the Vicariate Apostolic of Alabama and the Floridas in 1825 to as to recognize American sovereignty in the region. The pope named Monsignor Michael Portier as the vicar apostolic.

The new vicariate included all of Alabama, East and West Florida, and Arkansas. At the time of his accession, Portier was the only clergyman in the vicariate; he had two churches in Florida and one in Mobile, with an estimated Catholic population of 6,000. Portier began his administration by riding through his vicariate, offering communion, preaching, and administering the sacraments.

In 1829, Pope Pius VIII erected the Diocese of Mobile, taking the Florida Territory and the new State of Alabama from the vicariate. Portier became the first bishop of Mobile. The Birmingham area would remain part of the Diocese of Mobile, succeeded by the Diocese of Mobile-Birmingham, for the next 135 years.

In 1844, St. John the Baptist Catholic Church, the first Catholic church in Tuscaloosa, was opened. The first Catholic church in Birmingham was St. Paul's, opened in 1872. In 1877, St. Mary of the Visitation Church was completed, the first Catholic church in Huntsville. The Sisters of Charity in 1898 opened St. Vincent's Hospital, the first in Birmingham. Today it is UAB St. Vincent's Birmingham.

=== 1969 to 1993 ===
Pope Paul VI erected the Diocese of Birmingham, with territory taken from the Diocese of Mobile-Birmingham, on June 28, 1969, simultaneously renaming the mother diocese to Diocese of Mobile. The pope named Auxiliary Bishop Joseph Vath from Mobile-Birmingham as the first bishop of Birmingham.

In 1980, Pope John Paul II elevated the Diocese of Mobile to a metropolitan archdiocese and designated the Diocese of Birmingham as one of its suffragans. Vath died in 1987.Raymond Boland from the Archdiocese of Washington became the next bishop of Birmingham, named by John Paul II in 1988. The same pope appointed Boland as bishop of the Diocese of Kansas City-St. Joseph in 1993.

=== 1993 to present ===
To replace Boland, John Paul II named Auxiliary Bishop David Foley of the Diocese of Richmond as bishop of Birmingham. In 1999, Foley prohibited priests in his diocese, under most circumstances, from celebrating mass in the ad orientem position. Though the decree never specifically mentioned the Eternal Word Television Network (EWTN), observers agreed that the decree was directed at the influence of Mother Angelica's network on the practice. Foley retired in 2005. In 2007, Pope Benedict XVI named Bishop Robert Baker from the Diocese of Charleston as bishop of Birmingham. Baker retired as bishop of Birmingham in 2020.Pope Francis in 2020 named Bishop Steven J. Raica of the Diocese of Gaylord to replace Baker.

=== Reports of sexual abuse ===
In 1985, Bishop Vath sent the priest Charles V. Cross to a treatment center for clergy in Jemez Springs, New Mexico, after receiving complaints that Cross had sexually abused minors. When Cross returned to Birmingham, the bishop banned him from parish positions. In 2002, after receiving several more allegations against Cross, Bishop Foley permanently suspended him from ministry.

In 2004, four priests accused of sexual abuse who served in the diocese agreed to pay a financial settlement of $45,000 to eleven of their victims. In 2018, Bishop Baker released a list of six clergy who were accused of committing acts of sex abuse while serving the diocese. Baker stated that "they committed these deplorable acts” and apologized to the victims. He permanently removed the five priests from ministry.

== Bishops ==
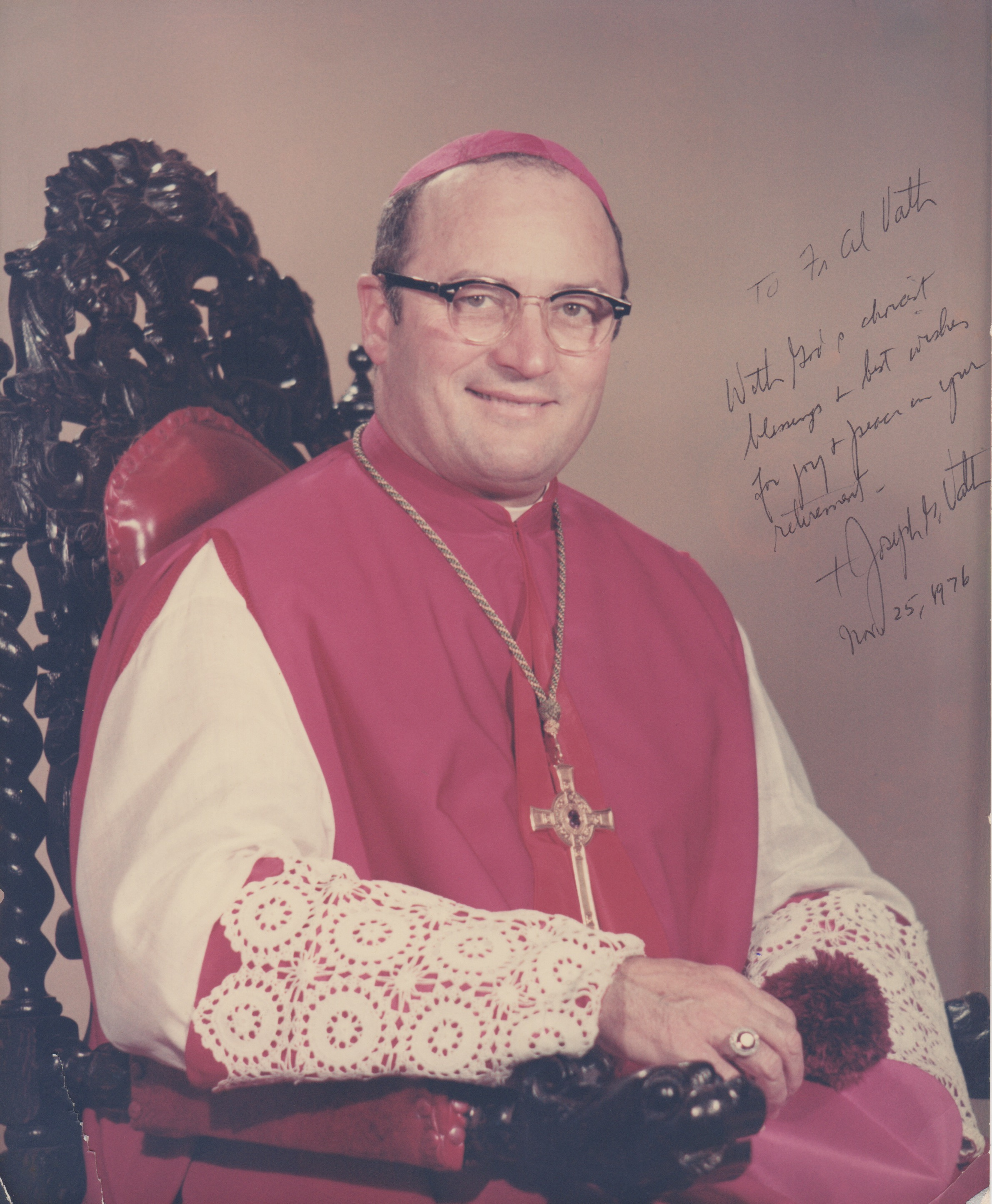
Bishop Vath

=== Bishops of Birmingham ===
1. Joseph Gregory Vath (1969–1987)
2. Raymond James Boland (1988–1993), appointed Bishop of Kansas City-Saint Joseph
3. David Edward Foley (1994–2005)
4. Robert Joseph Baker (2007–2020)
5. Steven John Raica (2020–present)

=== Other diocesan priests who became bishops ===
- William McDermott, appointed Auxiliary Bishop of Huancavélica in Peru in 1976
- Joseph Marino, appointed Titular Archbishop in 2008, later President of the Pontifical Ecclesiastical Academy

== Education ==
As of 2026, the Diocese of Birmingham operated 20 elementary and high schools. Four other schools in the diocese were operated independently.

=== High schools ===
- Birmingham – John Carroll Catholic High School
- Birmingham – Holy Family Cristo Rey Catholic High School (operated independently of diocese)
- Cullman – St. Bernard Preparatory School (operated independently of diocese)
- Huntsville – Pope John Paul II Catholic High School
- Tuscaloosa – Holy Spirit Catholic School
