= William Baum =

William Baum may refer to:

- William Wakefield Baum (1926–2015), Catholic bishop and cardinal
- William A. Baum (1924–2012), American astronomer
