= Cathedral of St. Mary of the Annunciation (Cape Girardeau, Missouri) =

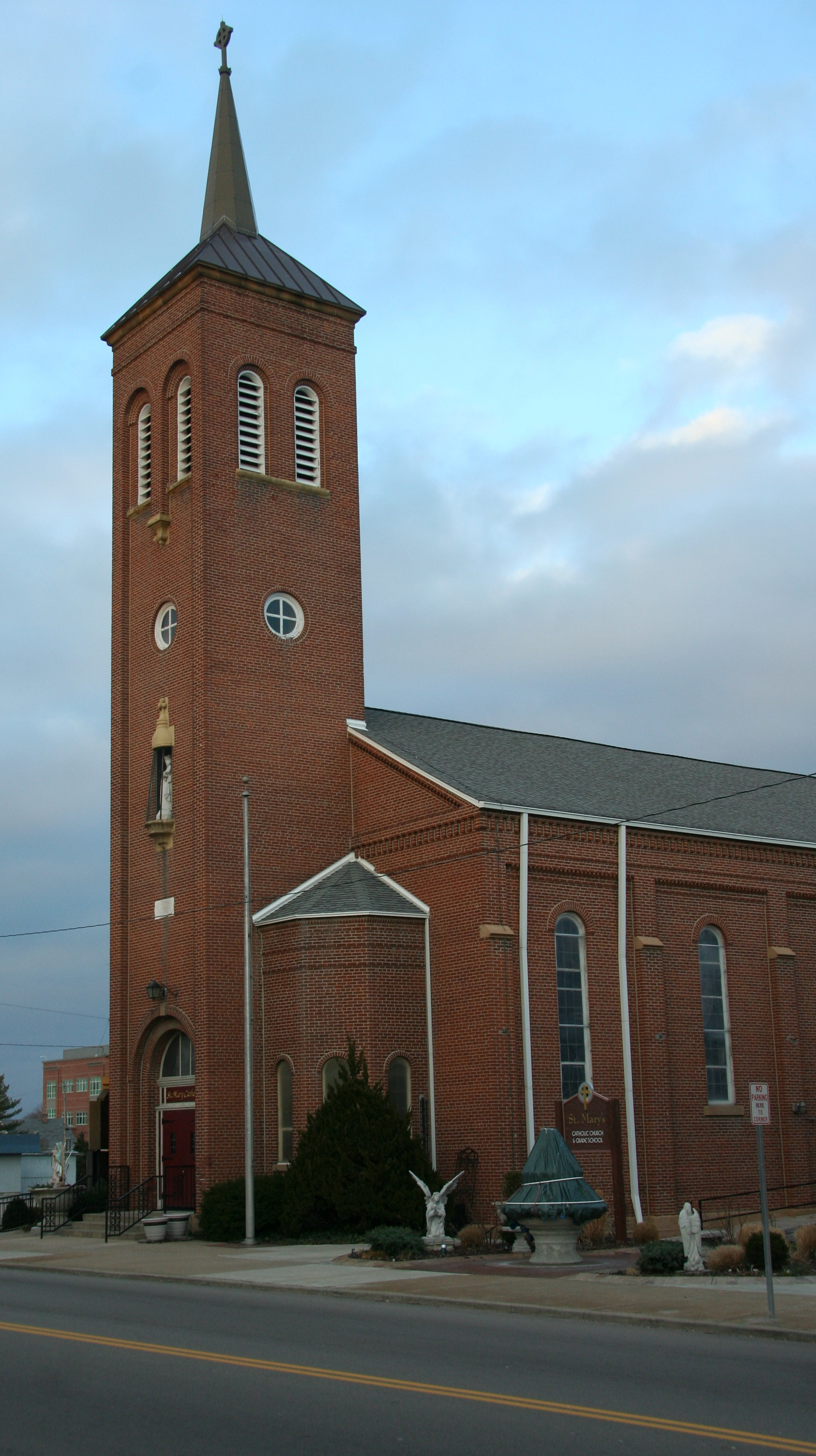

- Location in Missouri
- 37°18′03″N 89°31′38″W
- Location: 615 William St. Cape Girardeau, Missouri
- Country: United States
- Denomination: Roman Catholic
- Website: www.stmarycathedral.net

History
- Status: Cathedral/Parish
- Founded: 1868

Architecture
- Style: Romanesque Revival
- Completed: 1869

Specifications
- Materials: Brick

Administration
- Diocese: Springfield-Cape Girardeau

Clergy
- Bishop: Edward M. Rice
- Rector: Rev. Allan Saunders

The Cathedral of St. Mary of the Annunciation, also known as St. Mary's Cathedral, is a Catholic cathedral in Cape Girardeau, Missouri, in the United States. Along with St. Agnes Cathedral in Springfield, Missouri, it is the seat of the Diocese of Springfield-Cape Girardeau.

== History ==
=== St. Mary's Church ===
During the early 19th century, the Catholics in Cape Girardeau were under the jurisdiction of the Diocese of St. Louis. The first Catholic parish in the community, St. Vincent de Paul, was erected in 1853. By 1858, the increased number of German Catholics in Cape Girardeau prompted planning for a new German-language parish. However, the start of the American Civil War in 1861 thwarted any progress.

After the war ended in 1865, Catholic leaders purchased a property for the new church at the corner of Sprigg and William Streets in Cape Girardeau for $650. The groundbreaking was held in March 1868, and the cornerstone was laid in August of that year. St. Mary's Church was dedicated on February 2, 1869.

In 1875, the Sisters of St. Francis opened St. Francis Hospital in the community; today it is St. Francis Healthcare System.The sisters in 1877 built a convent on the northwest corner of Sprigg and William Streets. They expanded the building in 1882.

The parish constructed a rectory for St. Mary's in 1885. In 1891 they redecorated the church and installed bells in the tower. St. Mary's Cemetery was established in 1903. Major renovations of the church occurred in 1954 and 1968. The Magnificat windows were added in 1954.

=== Cathedral of St. Mary of the Annuciation ===
On July 2, 1956 Pope Pius XII established the Diocese of Springfield-Cape Girardeau The pope designated St. Agnes Church in Springfield as the cathedral for the new diocese and St. Mary's Church as the co-cathedral. The diocese built a new rectory for the priests in 1957.

The diocese in 1977 merged St. Vincent De Paul Parish into the cathedral parish in 1977, with the St. Vincent De Paul Church changed to a chapel of ease. The diocesee constructed the parish hall in 1978 and renovated the cathedral interior in 1985. The steeple was restored and a new pipe organ was installed from 1990 to 1991. The parish office building was completed in January 2000.

In 2022, a fire in the entranceway to the cathedral basement caused $20,000 in fire and smoke damage to the building. A homeless person had started a small fire to keep warm, but it got out of control.

== St. Mary Cathedral School ==
In 1873, two members of the Sisters of St. Francis arrived from Germany in Cape Girardeau to teach in the St. Mary's grade schoo. In 1882, the sisters opened the first school building; it had two classroom and a meeting room. The Sisters of St. Francis decided in 1903 to only work in St. Francis Hospital; they were replaced at St. Mary's School by the School Sisters of Notre Dame.

The parish built a new convent was built for the School Sisters in 1905. A new school building was dedicated in 1912. At this time, the school enrollment had reached 150 students. In 1925, the School Sisters opened a high school. An addition to the grade school building was built in 1937. The parish closed the high school in 1954.

With the dedication of the Cathedral of St. Mary of the Annunciation in 1956, the St. Mary School became the St. Mary Cathedral School. In 1978, a gymnasium and kindergarten were added to the grade school. The School Sisters left St. Mary's in 1993, to be replaced by lay teachers. An additional school building was dedicated in 2012.

== Gallery ==
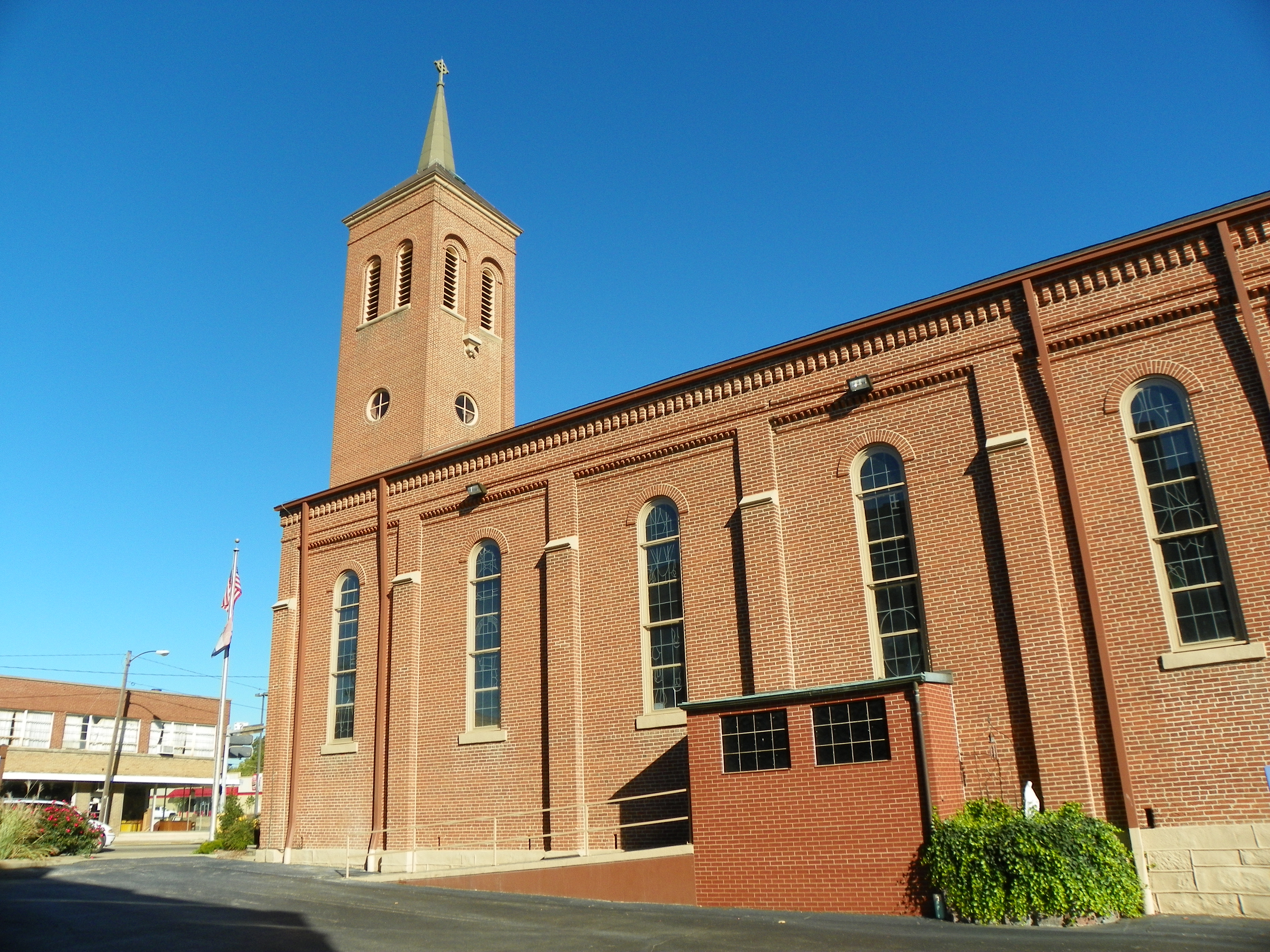
Cathedral looking northwest (2014)

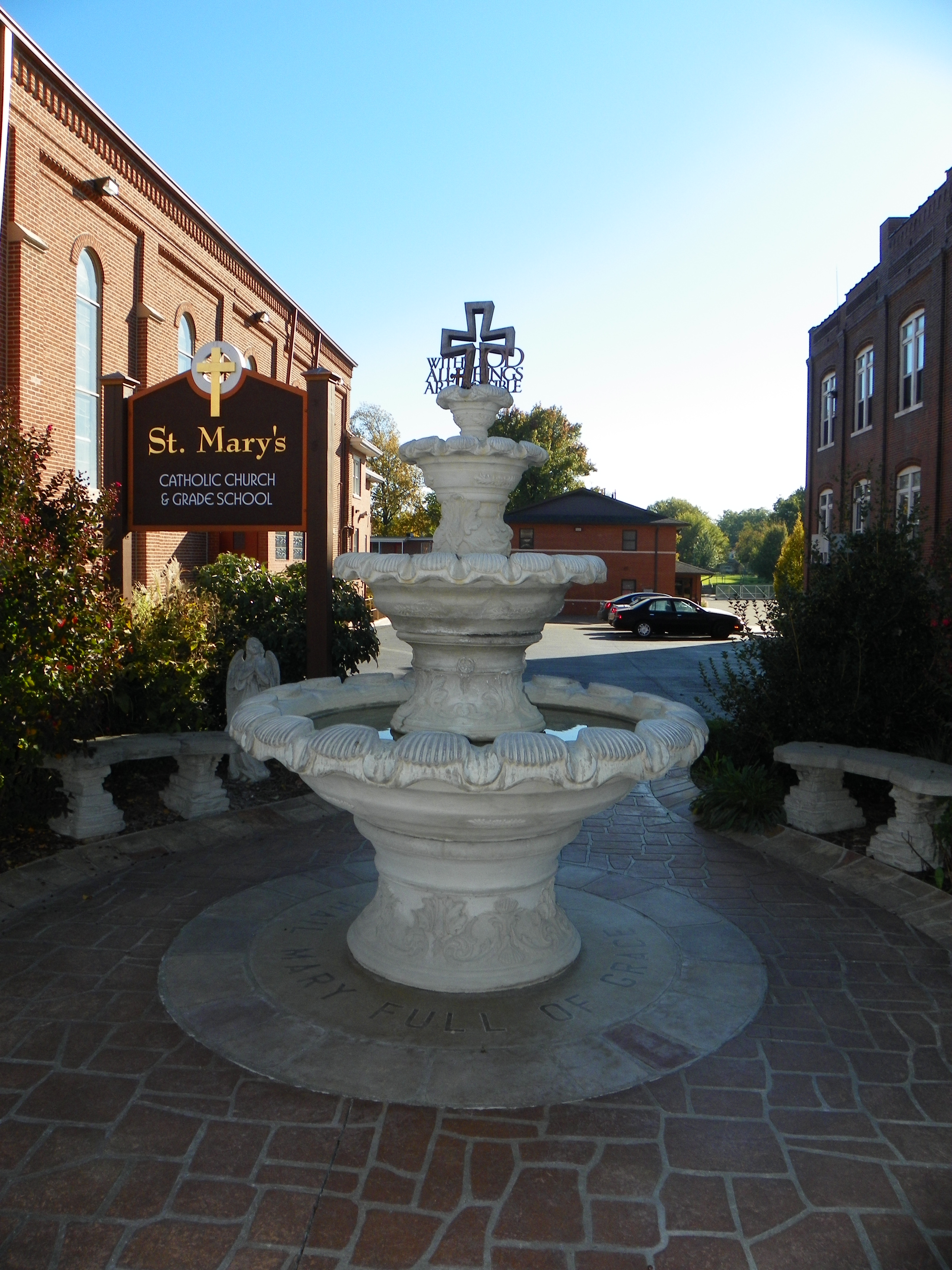
Fountain south of cathedral (2014)

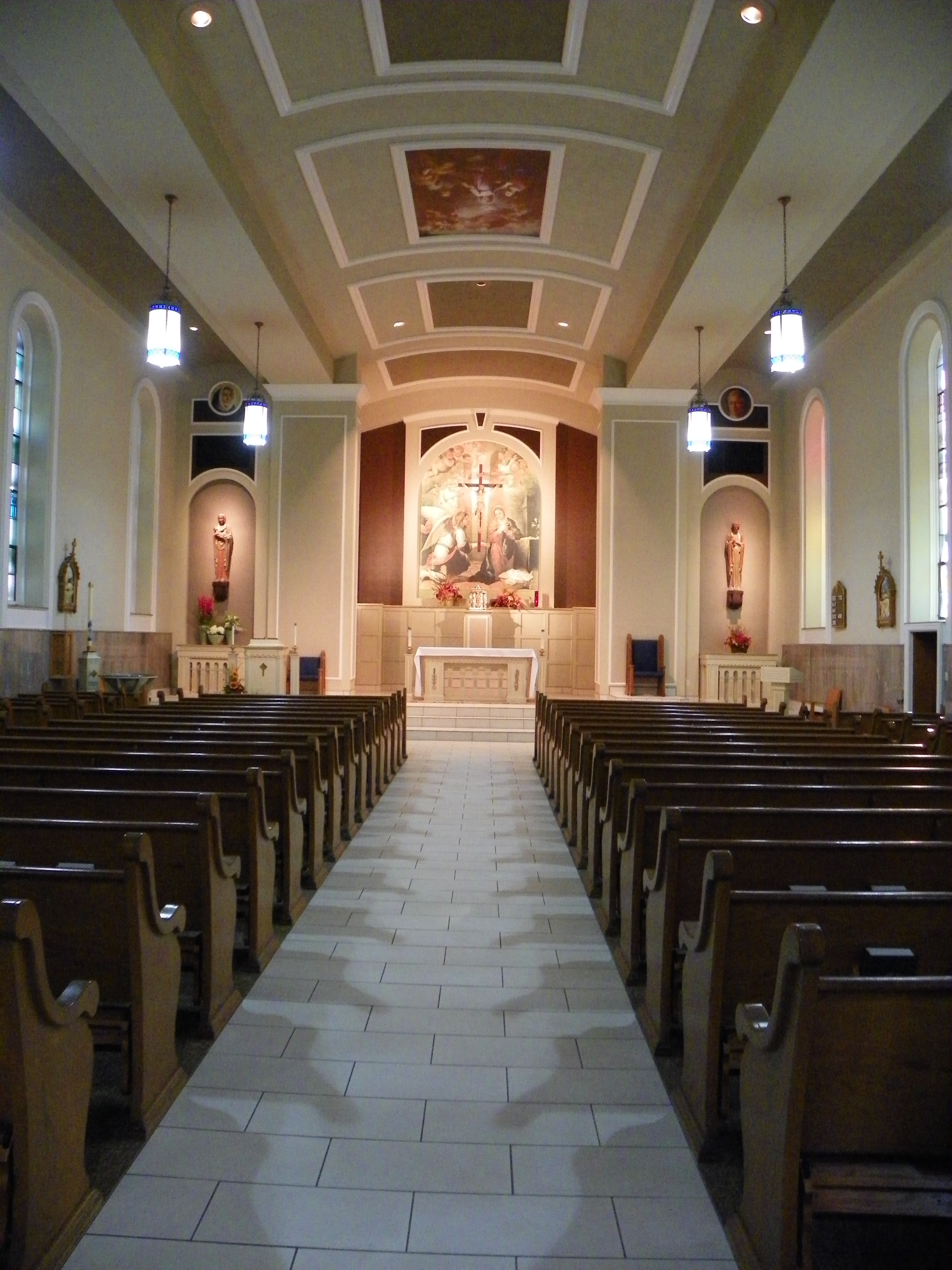
Sanctuary and nave (2014)

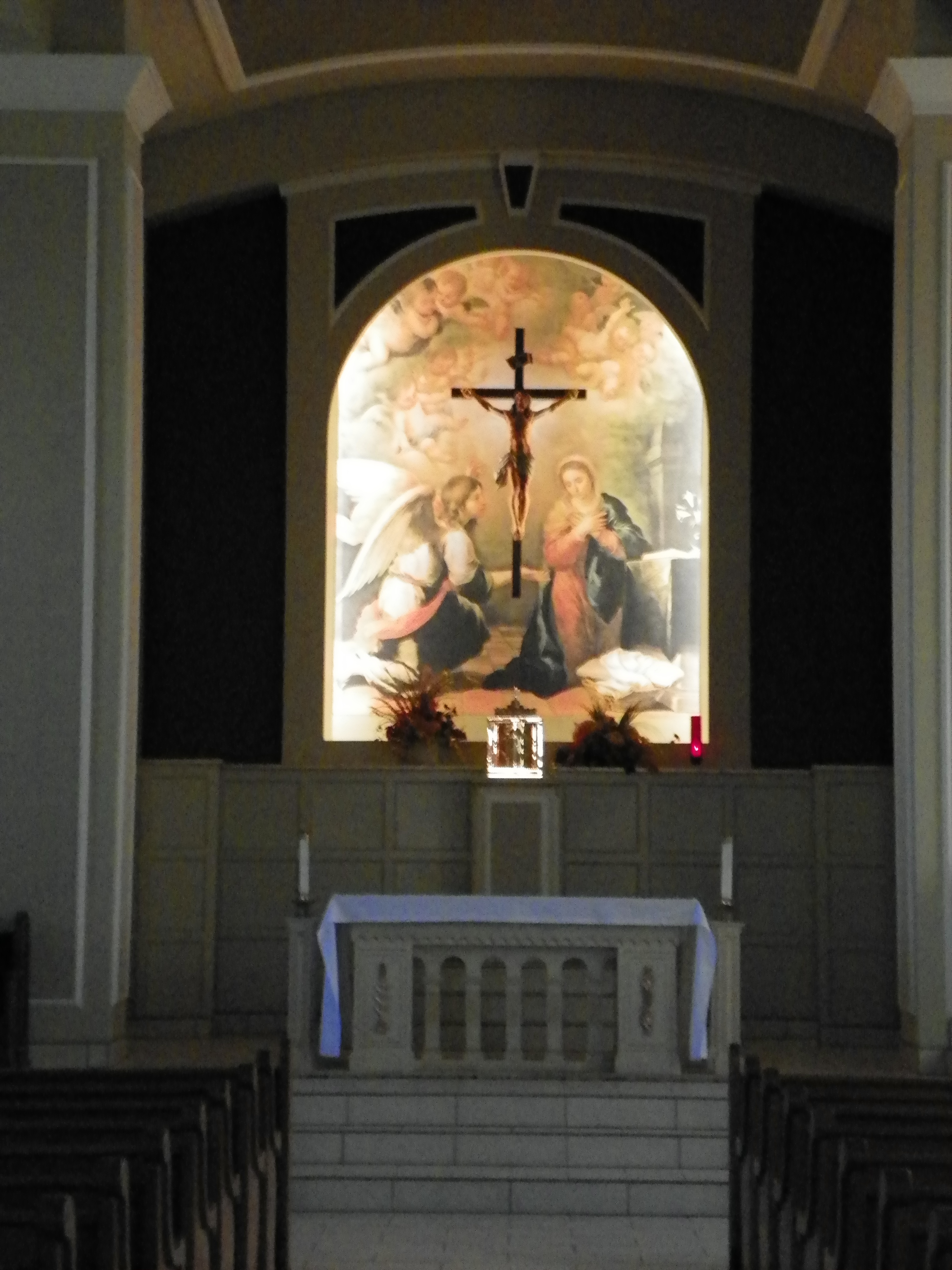
High altar (2014)

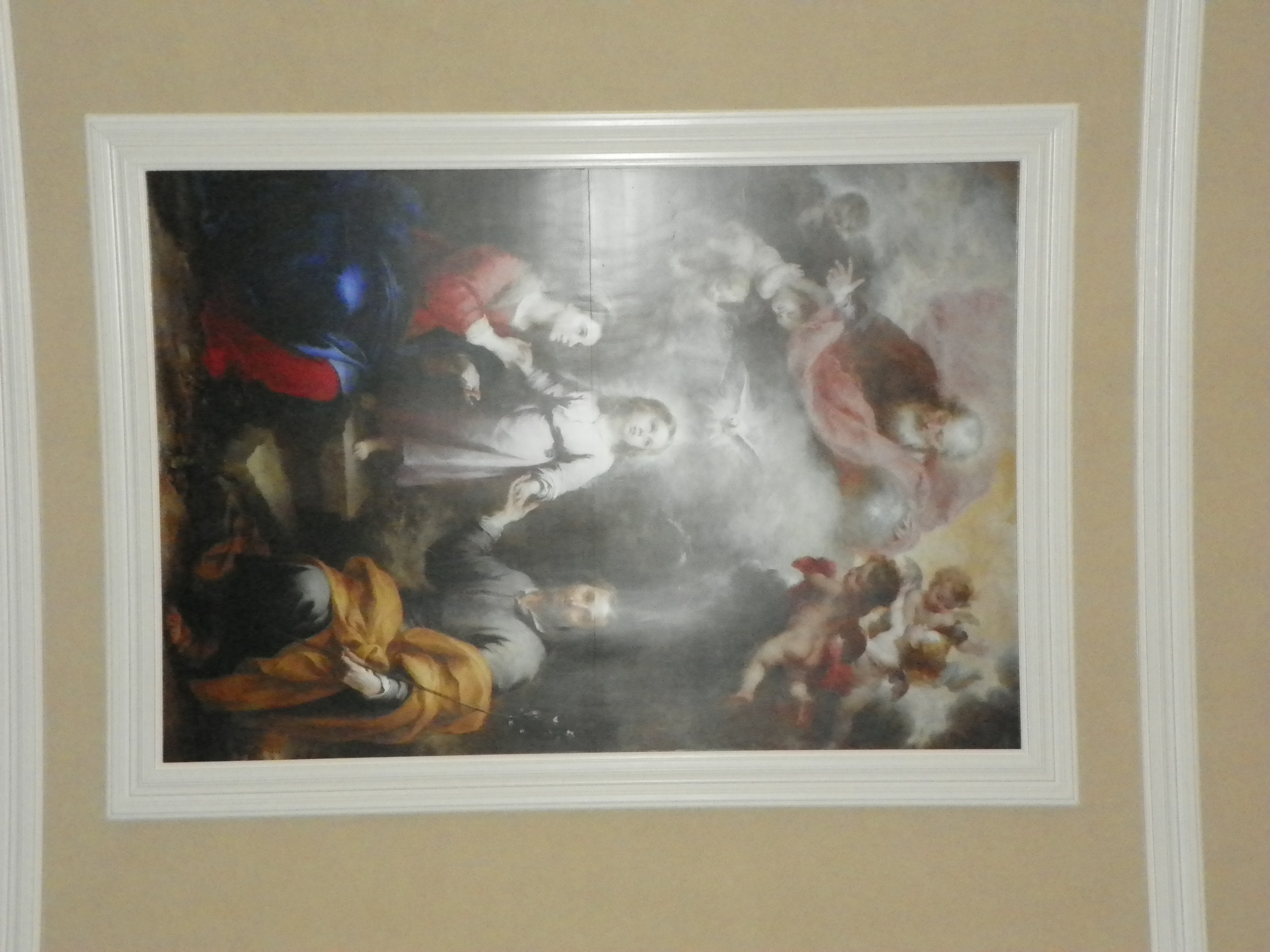
Ceiling mural (2014)

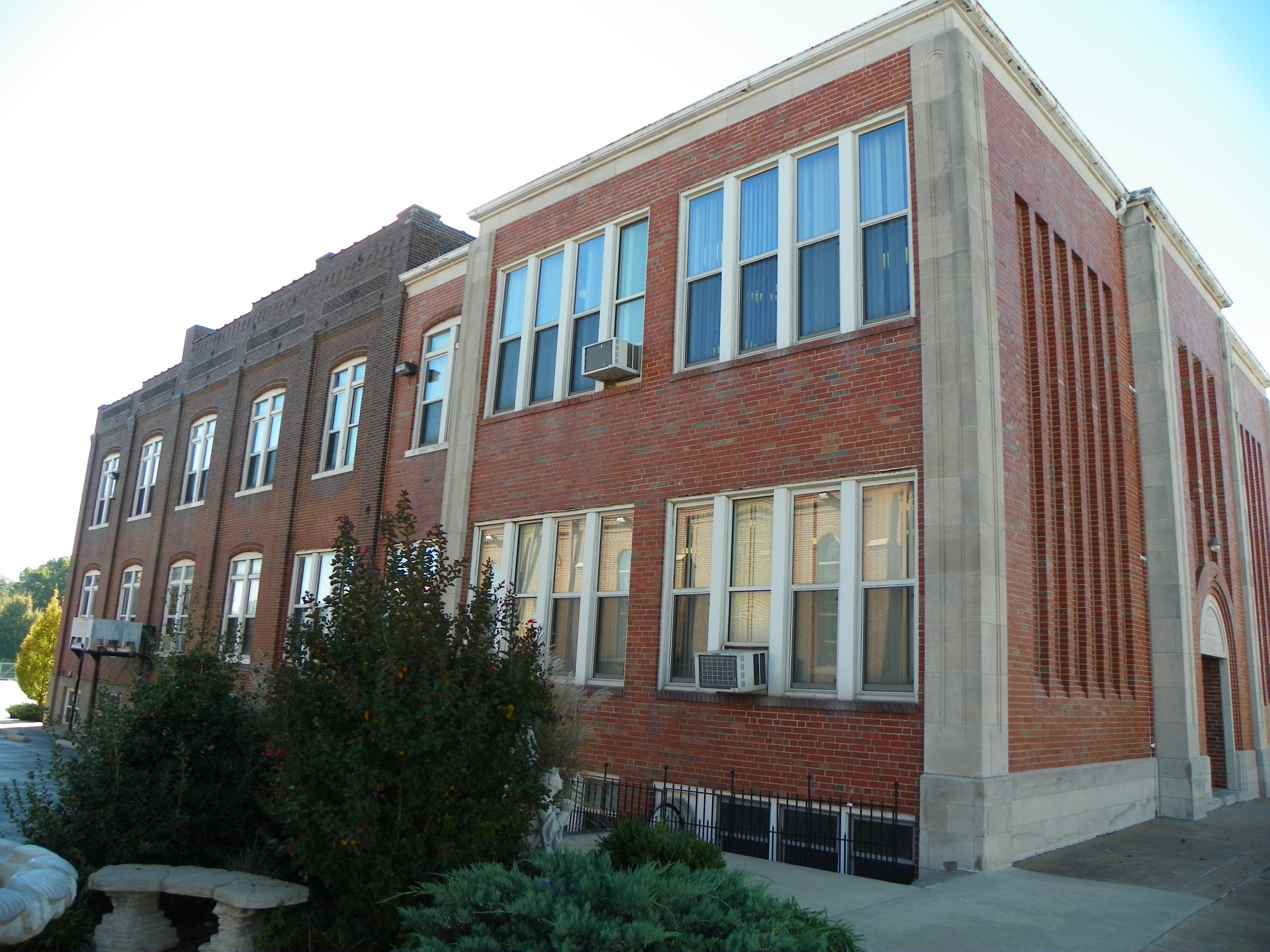
St. Mary Cathedral School (2014)

== See also ==
- List of Catholic cathedrals in the United States
- List of cathedrals in the United States
