= Diocese of Springfield =

The Diocese of Springfield is part of the official name of four dioceses in the United States, three Roman Catholic and one Episcopal:

- Roman Catholic Diocese of Springfield in Illinois
- Roman Catholic Diocese of Springfield in Massachusetts
- Roman Catholic Diocese of Springfield-Cape Girardeau (southern Missouri)
- Episcopal Diocese of Springfield (Illinois)
