= William Wakefield Baum =

American Catholic prelate (1926–2015)

His Eminence William Wakefield Baum
- Major Penitentiary Emeritus of the Apostolic Penitentiary
- Cardinal William Baum (2005)
- See: Santa Croce in Via Flaminia
- Appointed: April 6, 1990
- Term ended: November 22, 2001
- Predecessor: Luigi Dadaglio
- Successor: Luigi De Magistris
- Other post: Cardinal-Priest of Santa Croce in via Flaminia
- Previous posts: Roman Catholic Bishop of Springfield-Cape Girardeau (1970–1973); Roman Catholic Archbishop of Washington (1973–1980); Prefect of the Congregation for Catholic Education (1980–1990)

Orders
- Ordination: May 12, 1951 by Edwin Vincent O'Hara
- Consecration: April 6, 1970 by John Carberry
- Created cardinal: May 24, 1976 by Paul VI
- Rank: Cardinal-Priest

Personal details
- Born: William White; November 21, 1926 Dallas, Texas, United States
- Died: July 23, 2015 (aged 88) Washington, D.C., United States
- Denomination: Roman Catholic
- Motto: Ministerium reconciliationis (The ministry of reconciliation) — 2 Corinthians 5:18

Styles of William Baum
- Reference style: His Eminence
- Spoken style: Your Eminence
- Informal style: Cardinal
- See: Washington

Ordination history of William Wakefield Baum
History
Episcopal consecration
- Consecrated by: John Carberry (St Louis)
- Date: April 6, 1970
Episcopal succession
Bishops consecrated by William Wakefield Baum as principal consecrator
- Thomas William Lyons: September 12, 1974
- Eugene Antonio Marino: September 12, 1974

William Wakefield Baum (November 21, 1926 – July 23, 2015) was an American Catholic prelate who served as bishop of Springfield-Cape Girardeau in Missouri (1970 to 1973) and archbishop of Washington in the District of Columbia (1973 to 1980). He then served in the Roman Curia as prefect of the Congregation for Catholic Education (1980 to 1990) and the major penitentiary (1990 to 2001).

Baum was elevated to the College of Cardinals in 1976. At the time of his 1980 appointment as prefect of the Congregation for Catholic Education, he was the highest-ranking American ever in the church. By the time of his death, Baum had also been a cardinal longer than any other American.

== Biography ==
=== Early life and education ===
William White was born in Dallas, Texas, on November 21, 1926, to Harold E. and Mary Leona (née Hayes) White. His father, a Presbyterian, died when William was a young child, and he and his mother moved to Kansas City, Missouri. Mary Leona then married Jerome Charles Baum, a Jewish businessman, who adopted William and gave him his last name; Jerome Baum died when William was 12.

Baum received his early education at the parochial school of St. Peter's Parish in Kansas City, Missouri, and began to serve as an altar boy at the church at age ten. He entered St. John's, a high school minor seminary in Kansas City, Missouri, in 1940, and then studied philosophy in the undergraduate program at Cardinal Glennon College in Shrewsbury, Missouri. In 1947, Baum entered Kenrick Seminary in St. Louis for his graduate theological studies.

=== Priesthood ===
Baum was ordained to the priesthood by Archbishop Edwin V. O'Hara for the Diocese of Kansas City-St. Joseph in Missouri on May 12, 1951. After his ordination, the diocese assigned Baum as assistant pastor of St. Aloysius Parish in Kansas City, Missouri. He also taught theology and church history at St. Theresa College in Kansas City, Kansas, from 1954 to 1956 and at St. Aloysius Academy and Glennon High School, both in Kansas City, Kansas.

The diocese sent Baum to study in Rome at the Pontifical University of St. Thomas Aquinas, where he earned a Doctor of Sacred Theology degree in 1958. His thesis was entitled: "The Teaching of Cardinal Cajetan on the Sacrifice of the Mass".

Returning to Kansas City, Baum resumed his teaching duties at St. Theresa College between 1958 and 1963, while serving as secretary of the Diocesan Tribunal. He also did pastoral work at St. Theresa's Parish and St. Peter's Parish, both in Kansas City, Missouri. In 1960, Baum became pastor of St. Cyril's Parish in Sugar Creek, Missouri. He published "Considerations Toward the Theology of the Presbyterate" in 1961. He was named a papal chamberlain by Pope John XXIII in April 1961, and vice-chancellor of the diocese in 1962.

From 1962 to 1965, Baum served as a peritus, or theological expert, in Rome for Bishop Charles Helmsing at the Second Vatican Council. In that capacity, he worked with the Secretariat for Christian Unity and helped draft Unitatis Redintegratio, the council's 1964 decree on ecumenism. In 1964, he was named the first executive director of the Committee on Ecumenical and Interreligious Affairs for the National Conference of Catholic Bishops, a post which he held for five years. He also served as a member of the Joint Working Group of representatives of the Catholic Church and World Council of Churches (1965 to 1969) and of the Mixed Committee of representatives of the Catholic Church and the Lutheran World Federation (1965 to 1966).

In 1967, Baum returned to Kansas City, Missouri where he served as chancellor of the diocese and pastor of St. James Parish in that city. He was named a domestic prelate by the Vatican in 1968.

=== Bishop of Springfield-Cape Girardeau ===
On February 18, 1970, Baum was appointed as the third bishop of Springfield-Cape Girardeau by Pope Paul VI. He received his episcopal consecration at St. Agnes Cathedral in Springfield, Missouri, on April 6, 1970, from Cardinal John Carberry, with Bishops Charles Helmsing and Joseph Sullivan serving as co-consecrators. He selected as his episcopal motto: "Ministry of Reconciliation" from 2 Corinthians 5:18.

Baum served as a delegate to the 1971 World Synod of Bishops at the Vatican, and was chair of the Bishops' Committee for Ecumenical and Interreligious Affairs (1972 to 1975).

=== Archbishop of Washington ===
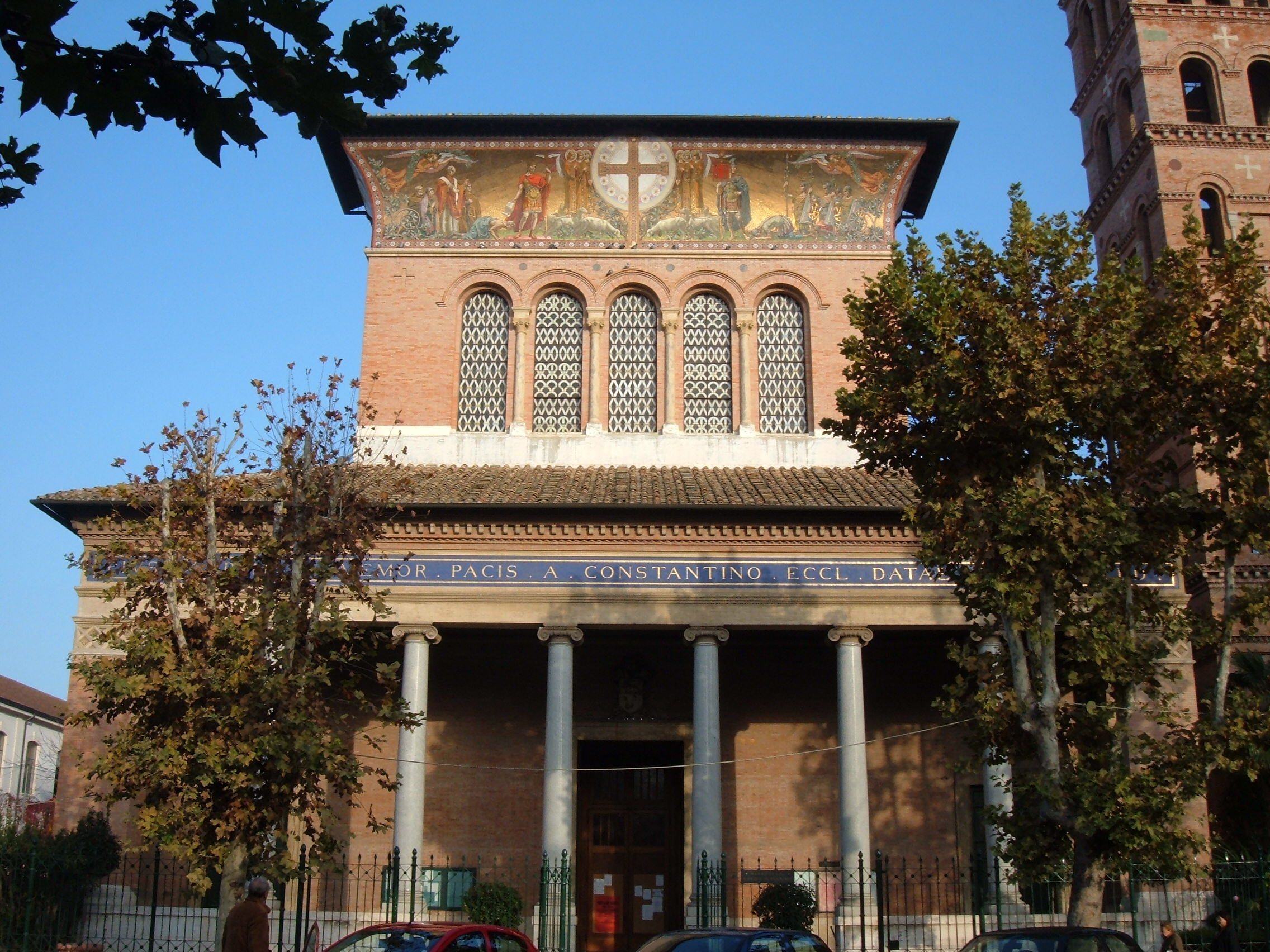
Basilica of Santa Croce, Rome, Italy

On March 5, 1973, Pope Paul VI elevated Baum to archbishop of Washington, D.C.. He was installed on May 9, 1973.

In the 1976 consistory, Paul VI named Baum as cardinal-priest of the Basilica of Santa Croce in Via Flaminia in Rome. He participated in the two conclaves of 1978 that elected Pope John Paul I and Pope John Paul II. On March 18, 1980, after his appointment to the Roman Curia, Baum resigned his position as archbishop of Washington.

=== Roman Curia ===
John Paul II appointed Baum in 1980 as prefect of the Congregation for Catholic Education, succeeding Cardinal Gabriel-Marie Garrone. As prefect, Baum oversaw the church educational policy and structure. He had jurisdiction over all the parochial schools, Catholic colleges and universities, Newman Centers, and seminaries worldwide. In 1990, John Paul II named Baum as major penitentiary of the Apostolic Penitentiary, succeeding Cardinal Luigi Dadaglio.

=== Resignation ===
Somewhat frail in his later years, Baum also suffered from deteriorating eyesight. His resignation as penitentiary was accepted the day after his 75th birthday in 2001, but he remained active in Rome to the extent that his health permitted. He attended the meeting of American cardinals called to deal with the sex abuse scandal in 2003. He was the ecclesiastical sponsor of Cardinal Bernard Law, the later disgraced archbishop of Boston.

As a cardinal elector, Baum participated in the 2005 papal conclave in Rome that elected Pope Benedict XVI. Baum was the senior cardinal priest to participate in that conclave and one of the only two cardinals appointed by Pope Paul VI, the other being Josef Ratzinger, who would become pope. (Note: A third eligible cardinal created by Paul VI, Jaime Sin, was too ill to attend the conclave and died soon afterwards.) On March 8, 2011, Baum became the longest-serving American cardinal, surpassing the record established by Cardinal James Gibbons of Baltimore in 1921.

Baum died at the age of 88 on July 23, 2015, in a home in Washington, D.C., run by the Little Sisters of the Poor, where he had spent his last years.

== Notes ==
Catholic Church titles
Preceded by Ignatius Jerome Strecker	Bishop of Springfield-Cape Girardeau; 1970–1973	Succeeded by Bernard Francis Law
Preceded by Patrick O'Boyle	Archbishop of Washington; 1973–1980	Succeeded by James Aloysius Hickey
Preceded by Gabriel-Marie Garrone	Prefect of the Congregation for Catholic Education; 1980–1990	Succeeded by Pio Laghi
Preceded by Luigi Dadaglio	Major Penitentiary of the Apostolic Penitentiary; 1990–2001	Succeeded by Luigi De Magistris
