= St. Agnes Cathedral (Springfield, Missouri) =

Historic church in Springfield, Missouri, United States

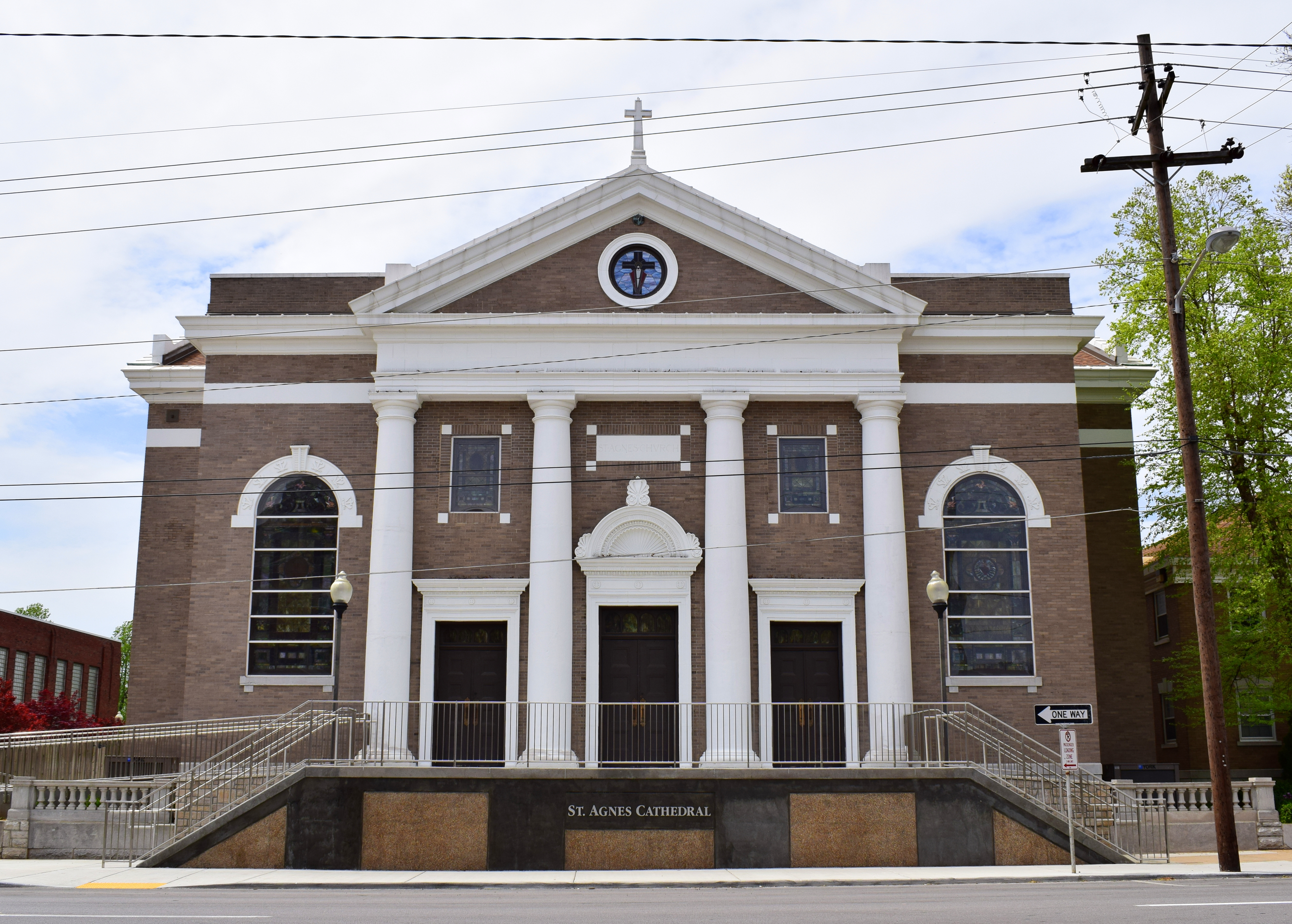
- East façade

- Location in Missouri St. Agnes Cathedral (the United States)
- 37°12′15″N 93°17′25″W
- Location: 533 S. Jefferson Ave. Springfield, Missouri
- Country: United States
- Denomination: Roman Catholic
- Website: saintagnescathedral.org

History
- Status: Cathedral/Parish
- Founded: 1908
- Dedication: November 24, 1910

Architecture
- Style: Neoclassical
- Completed: 1910

Specifications
- Materials: Brick

Administration
- Diocese: Springfield-Cape Girardeau

Clergy
- Bishop: Edward M. Rice
- Rector: Rev. Lewis Hejna

St. Agnes Cathedral is a Catholic cathedral in Springfield, Missouri, United States. Along with the Cathedral of St. Mary of the Annunciation in Cape Girardeau, Missouri, it is the seat of the Diocese of Springfield-Cape Girardeau.

== History ==
=== St. Agnes Church ===
When Immaculate Conception Parish was erected in 1866, it was the first Catholic parish in Springfield. At that time, Springfield was part of the Diocese of Kansas City in Missouri. Soon after its opening, Immaculate Conception established a school.

Four years later, the Atlantic and Pacific Railroad laid track through Springfield, separating Immaculate Conception School from many of its students on the south side. With 20 trains a day passing through Springfield, parents on the south side became concerned for their children's safety. In response, the parish opened a separate school in a house at South and Elm Streets south of the tracks. This school, eventually named St. Agnes Elementary School, was operated by the Sisters of Loretto

As the Catholic population increased on the south side, parishioners Bishop John Joseph Hogan of Kansas City for a new parish. Taking its name from the school, St. Agnes Parish was established in 1908. The diocese assigned Dennis J. O’Driscoll as its first priest and worship services began in the vacant Central Congregational Church. The parish soon began construction of its own church. In 1909, the parish moved St. Agnes school to the property of the new church.

St. Agnes Church was dedicated on November 24, 1910, by Bishop Thomas F. Lillis. A larger school building was opened in 1913 on the St. Agnes campus. In 1916, the parish opened St. Agnes High School. It is todaySpringfield Catholic High School. The parish in 1921 commissioned the Springfield Art Glass Company to create the Our Lady of the Lillies and Saint Agnes windows.

A basement fire in 1936 severely damaged the wood floors in the church sanctuary; the parish installed a concrete floor in replacement. Two years later, the parish moved St. Agnes High School into its own building near the rectory. After the American entry into World War II in 1941, the parish repurposed the old high school building U.S.O. Center. After the war, it was used as a parish recreation center.

=== St. Agnes Cathedral ===
In 1956, Pope Pius XII established the Diocese of Springfield-Cape Girardeau. St. Agnes Church was designated as St. Agnes Cathedral. In Cape Girardeau, St. Mary of the Annunciation became the co-cathedral. Auxiliary Bishop Charles Herman Helmsing of St. Louis was installed as the first bishop at St. Agnes Cathedral on November 28th, 1956.

The diocese tore down the recreation center in 1957 and began construction of a new St. Agnes School building for the elementary grades. It opened in 1958. St. Agnes Chapel was added to the cathedral in 1986 when the church building underwent a major renovation. The same year, the old elementary building was torn down. In 2011, the diocese performed necessary repairs on the cathedral attic and the foundation of the school building.

The diocese in 2025 began construction of a 13,000 square feet (1,200 m^{2}) parish hall to be connected to the cathedral. The new facility would have a seating capacity of 275 and also include the parish offices.

== Pastors/Rectors ==
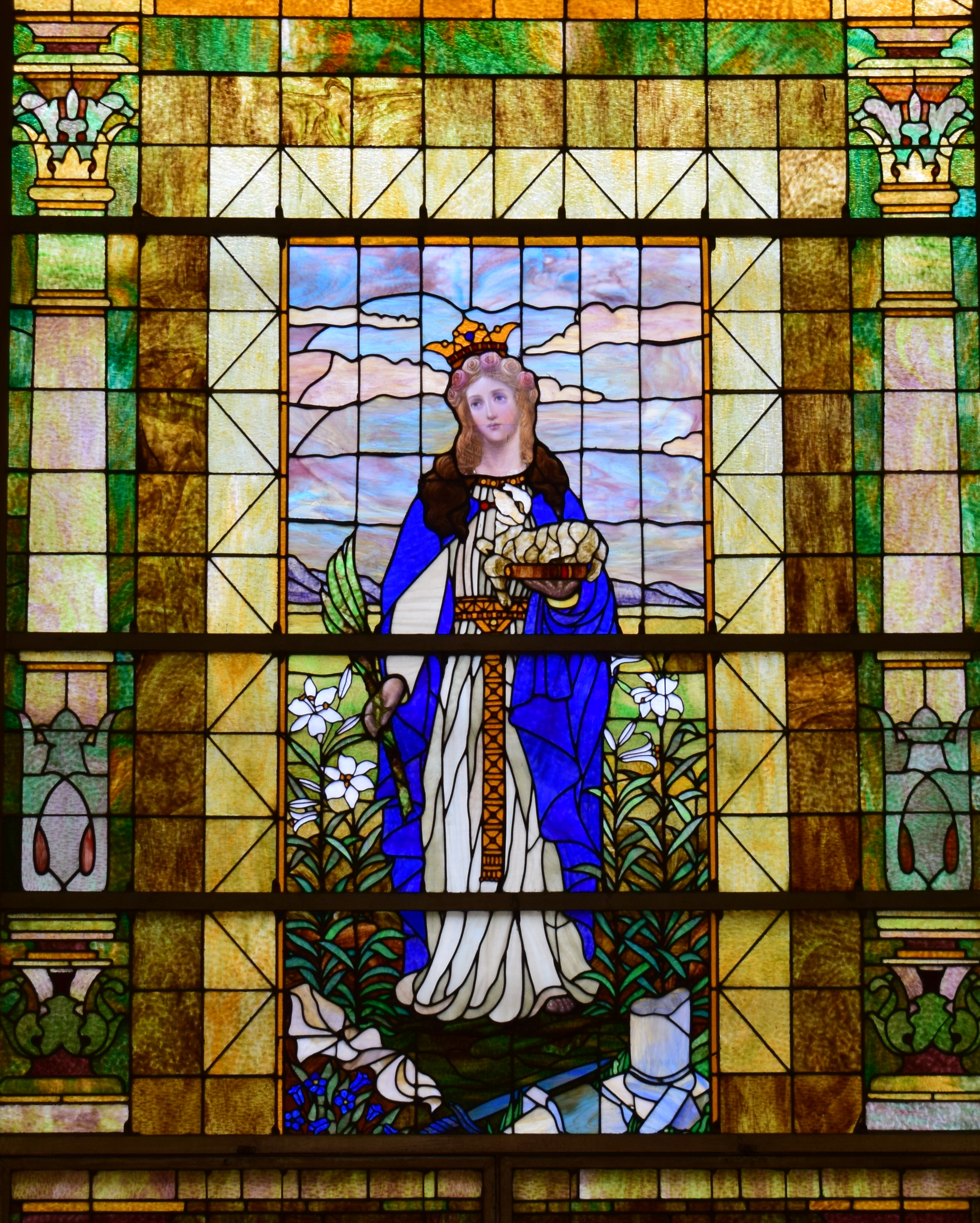
St. Agnes stained glass window (2017)

The following priests have served as pastor or cathedral rector at St. Agnes:

=== Pastors ===
- Dennis J. O’Driscoll (1908)
- John M. Sheridan (1908–1921)
- Patrick J. Downey (1921–1922)
- L. Curtis Tiernan (1922–1928)
- Robert F. Hayes (1928)
- Frank D. McCardle (1928–1931)
- Charles A. Dibbins (1931–1935)
- James J. Hally (1935–1937)
- Paul D. Dunn (1937–1944)

=== Rectors ===
- Valentine A. Schroeger (1944–1966)
- John H. Westhues (1966–1978)
- Sylvester H. Bauer (1978–1981)
- Thomas E. Reidy (1981–1992)
- Thomas P. Kiefer (1992–2003)
- Mike McDevitt (2003–2014)
- Lewis Hejna (2014–present)
Cathedral images

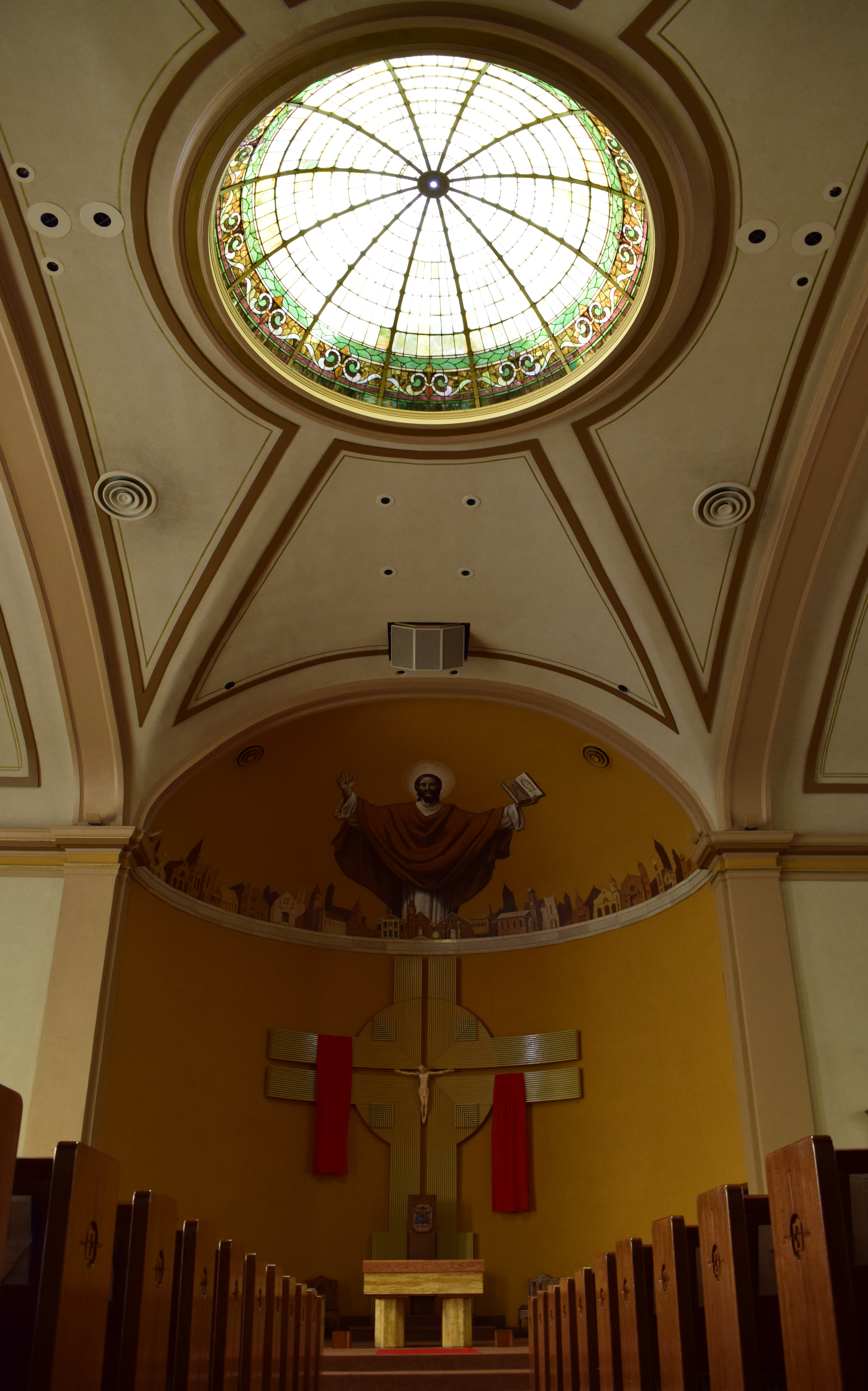
View of altar (2017)

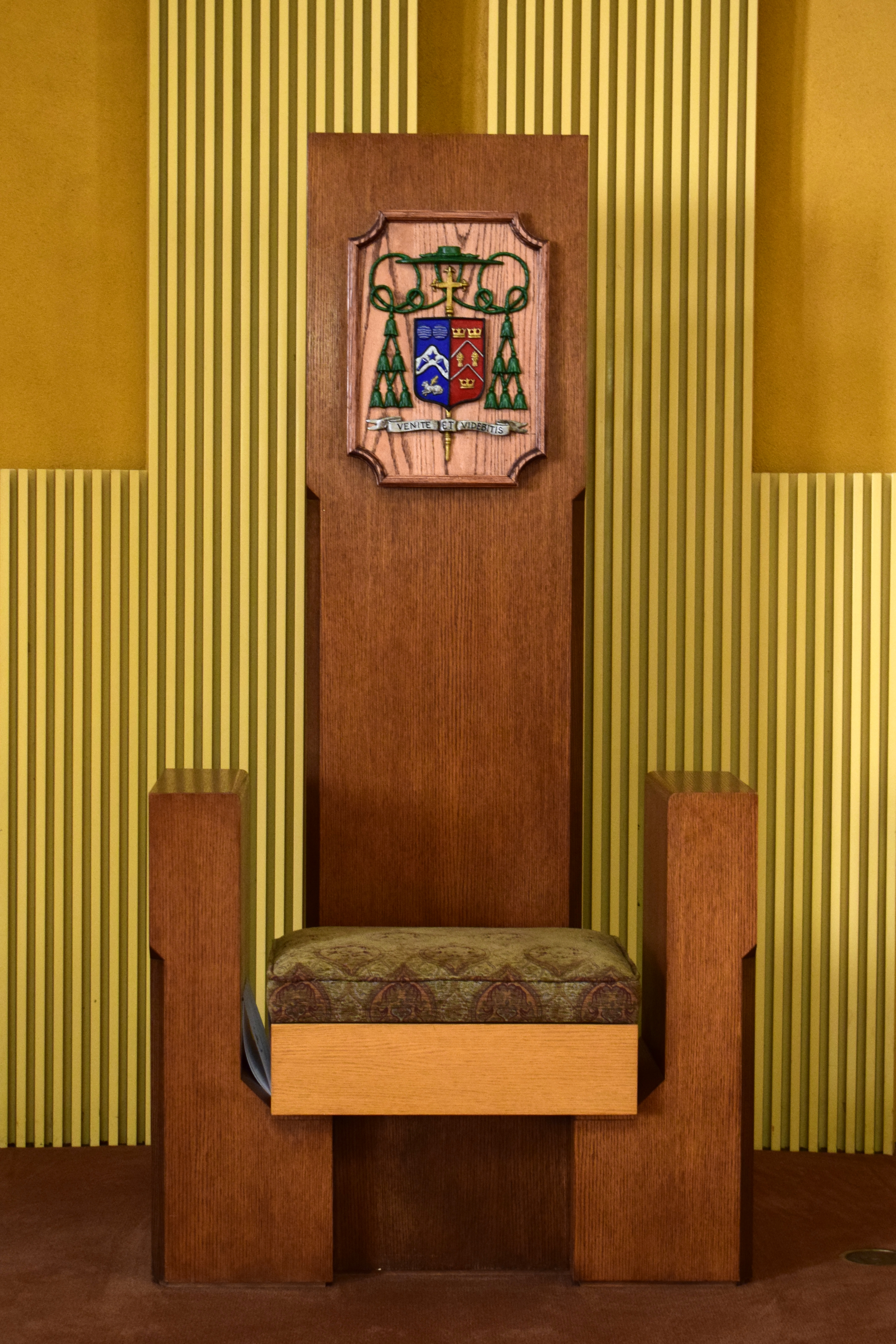
Cathedra (2017)

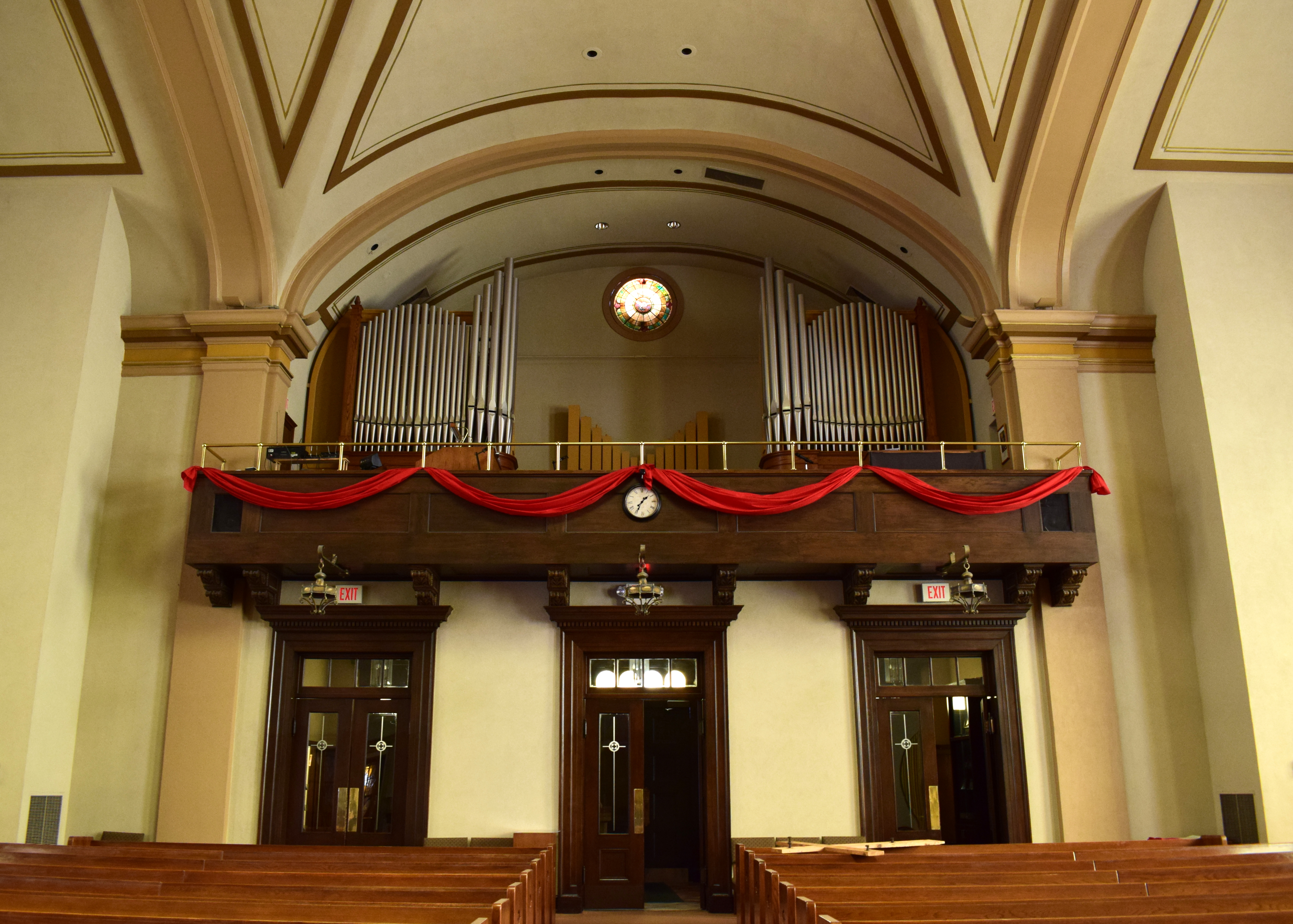
Pipe organ in loft (2017)

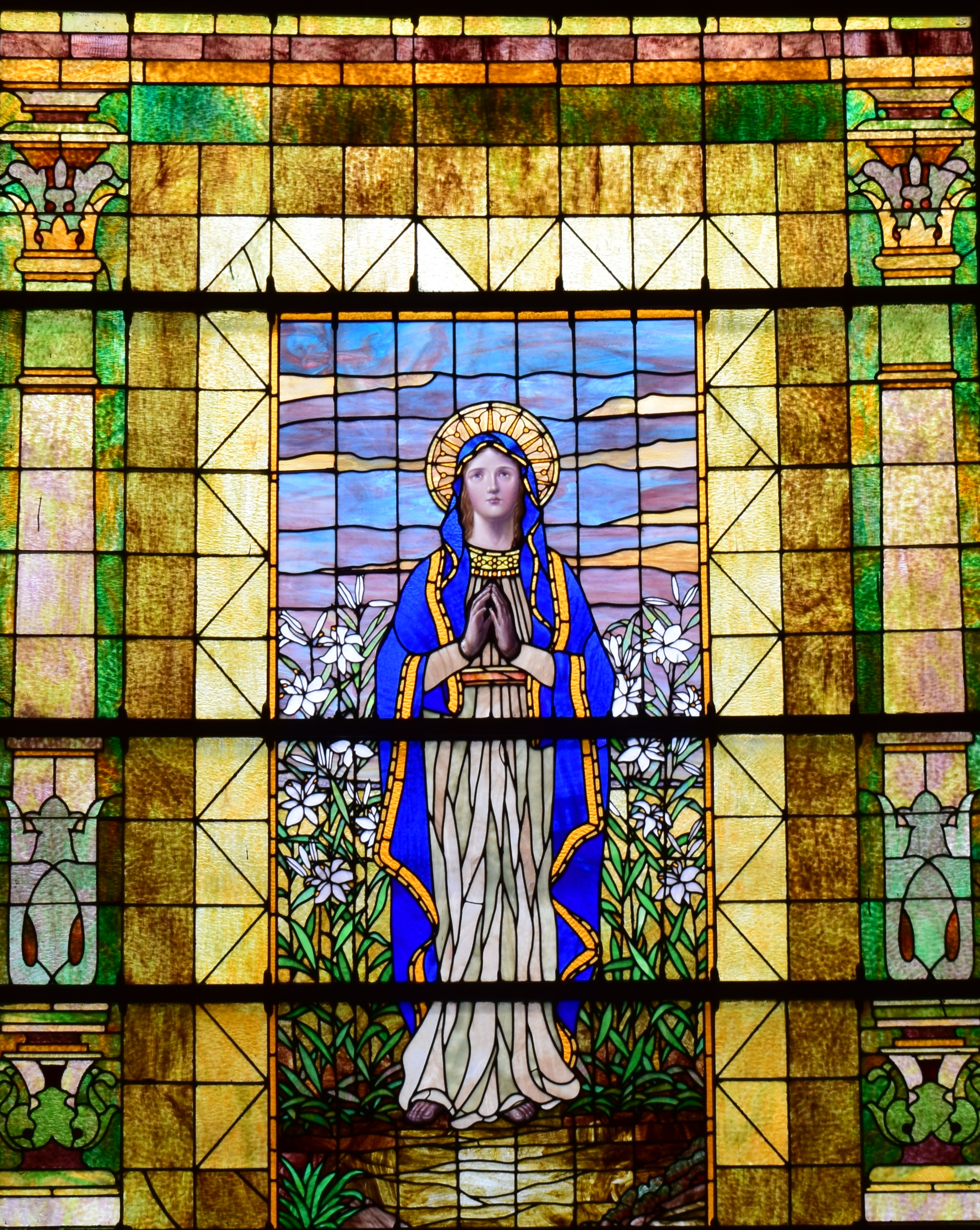
Blessed Virgin Mary stained glass window (2017)

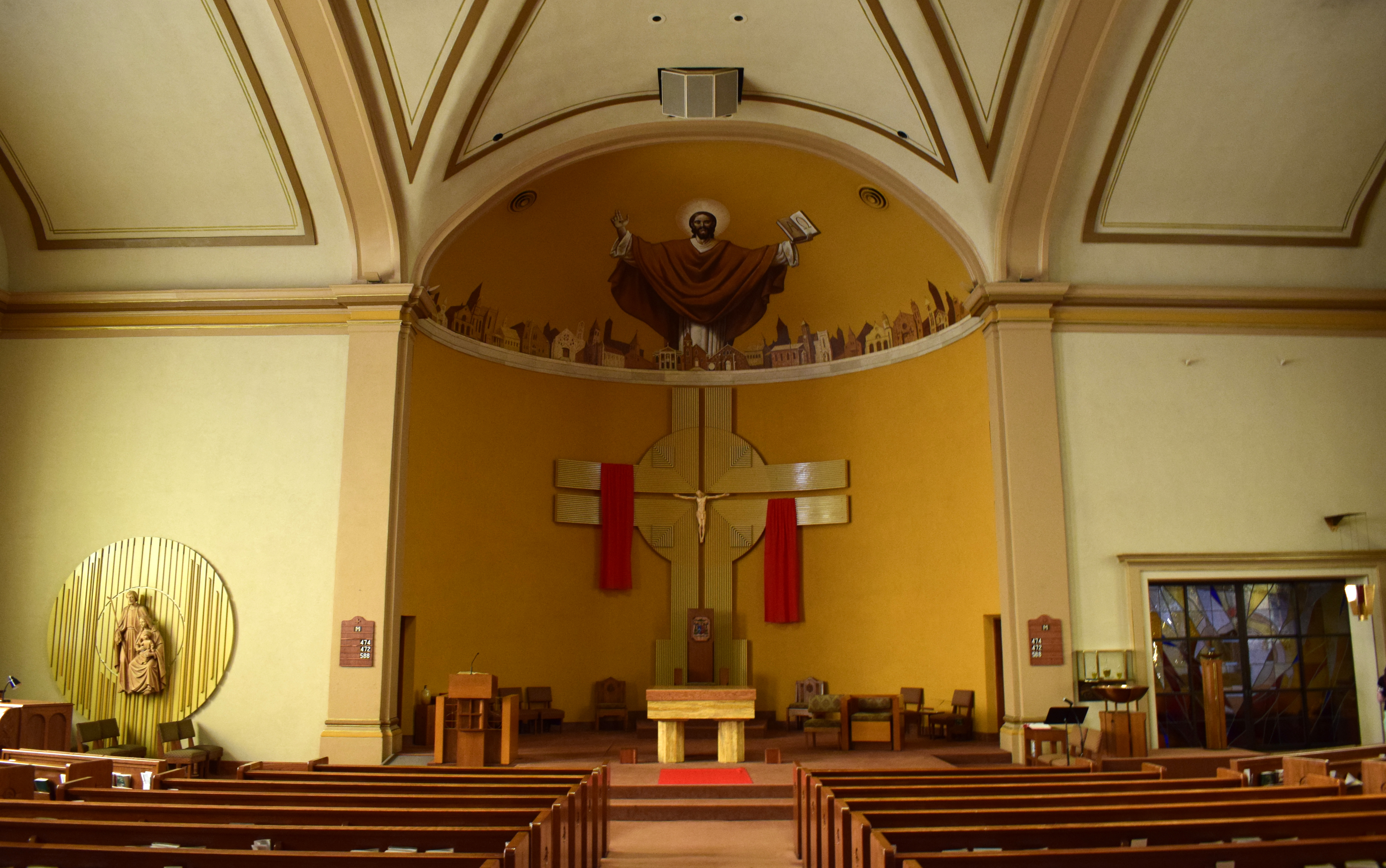
View of altar from nave (2017)

== See also ==
- List of Catholic cathedrals in the United States
- List of cathedrals in the United States
