= Committee on Ecumenical and Interreligious Affairs =

Organization of the US Conference of Catholic Bishops

The Committee on Ecumenical and Interreligious Affairs is the principal ecumenical and interfaith organization of the United States Conference of Catholic Bishops.

Active since the 1960s, it is firmly rooted in the teachings of the Second Vatican Council on dialogue between religions (Nostra Aetate) and dialogue between Christians (Unitatis Redintegratio).

Because the United States is one of the most religiously diverse countries in the world, it has also affected the global ecumenical and interfaith movement in collaborating with organizations that have members and leadership in other nations.

== Ecumenical dialogue committees ==
- Joint Working Group with the National Council of Churches
- Faith and Order Commission
- Disciples of Christ - Roman Catholic dialogue
- Methodist - Catholic dialogue
- Lutheran-Roman Catholic dialogue
- North American Orthodox-Catholic Theological Consultation
- Anglican - Roman Catholic consultation
- Oriental Orthodox - Roman Catholic consultation
- Polish National Catholic - Roman Catholic dialogue

== Interfaith dialogue partners ==
- American Jewish Committee
- American Jewish Congress
- Synagogue Council of America
- American Muslim Council
- Islamic Society of North America
- Islamic Circle of North America
- Muslim American Society
- Buddhist Sangha Council of Southern California
- Ch’an/Zen Buddhism on the West Coast
- Interfaith Relations Commission of the National Council of Churches

== Chairmen ==
- Lawrence Shehan (1964–1965)
- John Carberry (1965–1969)
- Charles Helmsing (1969–1972)
- William Wakefield Baum (1972–1975)
- Bernard Law (1975–1978)
- Ernest L. Unterkoefler (1978–1981)
- John F. Whealon (1981–1984)
- William Keeler (1984–1987)
- James Francis Stafford (1987–1990)
- Rembert Weakland, O.S.B. (1990–1993)
- Oscar H. Lipscomb (1993–1996)
- Alexander J. Brunett (1996–1999)
- Tod Brown (1999–2002)
- Stephen Blaire (2002–2005)
- Richard J. Sklba (2005–2008)
- Wilton D. Gregory (2008–2011)
- Denis J. Madden (2011–2020)
- David P. Talley (2020–present)
