= Springfield Catholic High School (Missouri) =

Springfield
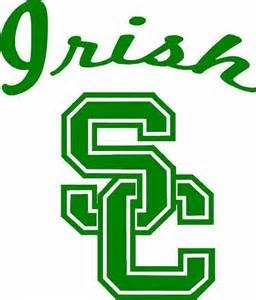

Location
- 2340 South Eastgate Avenue; Springfield, (Greene County), Missouri 65809; United States; 37°10′13″N 93°13′22″W

Information
- Type: Parochial school, Private, coeducational
- Religious affiliation: Roman Catholic
- Established: 1916
- CEEB code: 263295
- Principal: Jeanne Skahan
- Director of Schools: Sister Cecilia Ann Rezac, M.S.
- Teaching staff: 29.3 (on an FTE basis) (2021–22)
- Grades: 9–12
- Average class size: 100
- Student to teacher ratio: 13.0
- Colors: Green, Gold, and white
- Team name: Fightin Irish
- National ranking: 374
- Website: springfieldcatholic.org

Springfield Catholic High School is a parochial, Roman Catholic high school in Springfield, Missouri, United States. It is located in the Roman Catholic Diocese of Springfield-Cape Girardeau.

== Background ==
Springfield Catholic High School was established in 1916 as St. Agnes High School to serve the families of St. Agnes Parish. In 1957, it became a regional high school serving parishes all around Springfield, including St. Agnes Cathedral and School, St. Joseph Parish and school, Immaculate Conception Parish and School, St. Elizabeth Anne Seton Parish and School, Holy Trinity Parish, and Sacred Heart Parish. The school was renamed Springfield Catholic in 1974 and relocated to its present location in 1986. The school was recently named one of the top 50 catholic high schools in the nation. Generous donations gathered by funding campaigns helped to replace facilities and remodel a portion of the school.

== Notable alumni ==
- Zach Cole, MLB player (Houston Astros organization)
- Rod Kanehl, former MLB player (New York Mets)
- Phil Mulkey, former U.S. Olympic decathlon athlete
- Roy Smalley Jr., former MLB player (Chicago Cubs, Philadelphia Phillies)
- Seth Wand, former NFL offensive lineman; third-round draft selection by the Houston Texans in 2003
