= John Joseph Leibrecht =

American Catholic prelate (born 1930)

His Excellency, The Most Reverend John Joseph Leibrecht
- Bishop Emeritus of Springfield–Cape Girardeau
- Province: Saint Louis
- See: Springfield–Cape Girardeau
- Appointed: October 20, 1984
- Installed: December 12, 1984
- Retired: January 24, 2008
- Predecessor: Bernard Francis Law
- Successor: James Vann Johnston, Jr.

Orders
- Ordination: March 17, 1956 by Joseph Ritter
- Consecration: December 12, 1984 by John L. May, Bernard Francis Law, and Glennon Patrick Flavin

Personal details
- Born: August 8, 1930 (age 96) Overland, Missouri
- Education: Kenrick Seminary; Catholic University of America
- Motto: State in fide (Latin for 'Stand firm in faith')
- Styles
- Reference style: His Excellency; The Most Reverend
- Spoken style: Your Excellency
- Religious style: Bishop

John Joseph Leibrecht (born August 8, 1930) is an American Catholic prelate who served as Bishop of Springfield-Cape Girardeau in southern Missouri from 1984 to 2008.

== Biography ==
=== Early life ===
Leibrecht was born on August 8, 1930, in Overland, Missouri, to John and Ellen (née Begley) Leibrecht. His parents were of German and Irish descent and has one brother became a priest. John attended the St. Louis Archdiocesan Latin School, excelling at basketball. He then studied at the St. Louis Preparatory Seminary in St. Louis, and Kenrick Seminary in Shrewsbury.

=== Priesthood ===
Leibrecht was ordained to the priesthood for the Archdiocese of St. Louis by Archbishop Joseph Ritter on March 17, 1956. After his ordination, the archdiocese assigned Leibrecht as associate pastor at Cathedral of Saint Louis Parish. He furthered his studies at The Catholic University of America in Washington, D.C., where he earned a Doctor of Education degree in 1961. Leibrecht taught and served as principal at Rosati-Kain High School in St. Louis for 11 years, then served for nine years as superintendent of education for the Catholic schools. In 1981, he was appointed as pastor of Sacred Heart Parish in Florissant.

=== Bishop of Springfield-Cape Girardeau ===
On October 20, 1984, Leibrecht was appointed the fifth bishop of Springfield-Cape Girardeau by Pope John Paul II. Leibrecht received his episcopal consecration at Immaculate Conception Church in Springfield, on December 12, 1984, from Archbishop John May, with Archbishop Bernard Law and Bishop Glennon Flavin serving as co-consecrators.

In addition to his duties as diocesan bishop, Leibrecht chaired the United States Conference of Catholic Bishops (USCCB) Committee on Education (1986-1989) and the Ex Corde Ecclesiae Committee on U.S. Catholic Colleges and Universities (1991-2000). He was a board member of the Catholic Health Association from 1997 to 2003, and chair of the board for the Center for Applied Research in the Apostolate (CARA) at Georgetown University in Washington, D.C.

=== Retirement ===
Upon reaching the mandatory retirement age of 75, Leibrecht submitted his letter of resignation as bishop of Springfield-Cape Girardeau to Pope Benedict XVI in August 2005. The pope accepted his resignation on January 24, 2008.

== See also ==
- Catholic Church hierarchy
- Catholic Church in the United States
- Historical list of the Catholic bishops of the United States
- List of Catholic bishops of the United States
- Lists of patriarchs, archbishops, and bishops

== Episcopal succession ==
Catholic Church titles
Preceded by Bernard Francis Law	Bishop of Springfield-Cape Girardeau; 1984–2008	Succeeded by James Vann Johnston, Jr.
