= Bernard Francis Law =

American Catholic prelate (1931–2017)

His Eminence Bernard Francis Law
- Cardinal; Archpriest of the Basilica of Santa Maria Maggiore
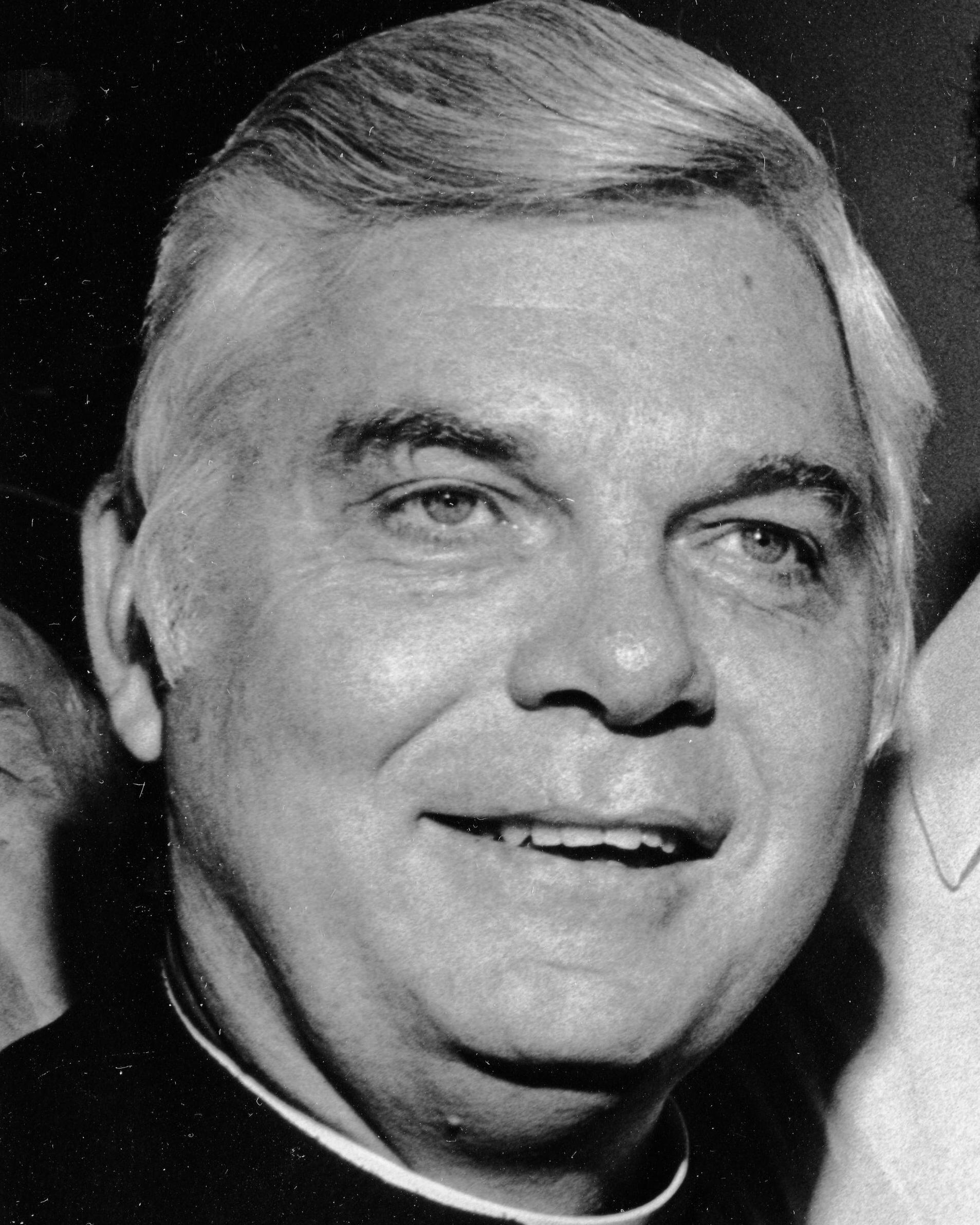
- Law in the mid-1980s
- Archdiocese: Boston
- Appointed: January 11, 1984
- Installed: March 23, 1984
- Term ended: December 13, 2002
- Predecessor: Humberto Sousa Medeiros (Boston); Carlo Furno (Archpriest)
- Successor: Seán Patrick O'Malley (Boston); Santos Abril y Castelló (Archpriest)
- Other post: Cardinal-Priest of Santa Susanna (1985–2017)}}
- Previous posts: Bishop of Springfield-Cape Girardeau (1973–1984); Archbishop of Boston (1984-2002)

Orders
- Ordination: May 21, 1961 by Egidio Vagnozzi
- Consecration: December 5, 1973 by Joseph Bernard Brunini, William Wakefield Baum, and Joseph Bernardin
- Created cardinal: May 25, 1985 by John Paul II
- Rank: Cardinal-Priest

Personal details
- Born: November 4, 1931 Torreón, Coahuila, Mexico
- Died: December 20, 2017 (aged 86) Rome, Italy
- Denomination: Catholic Church
- Education: Harvard University
- Motto: To live is Christ
- Styles
- Reference style: His Eminence
- Spoken style: Your Eminence
- Religious style: Cardinal
- Informal style: Cardinal
- See: Boston (Emeritus)

Ordination history
History
Episcopal consecration
- Consecrated by: Joseph Bernard Brunini (Jackson)
- Date: December 5, 1973
Episcopal succession
Bishops consecrated by Bernard Francis Law as principal consecrator
- Tomás Andrés Mauro Muldoon: October 8, 1984
- Robert Joseph Banks: September 19, 1985
- Roberto González Nieves: October 3, 1988
- John Richard McNamara: May 21, 1992
- John Patrick Boles: May 21, 1992
- John Brendan McCormack: December 27, 1995
- William Francis Murphy: December 27, 1995
- Francis Xavier Irwin: September 17, 1996
- Emilio Simeon Alluè: September 17, 1996
- Richard Joseph Malone: March 1, 2000
- Walter James Edyvean: September 14, 2001
- Richard Gerard Lennon: September 14, 2001

Bernard Francis Law (November 4, 1931 – December 20, 2017) was a Mexican-born American prelate of the Catholic Church who served as Archbishop of Boston from 1984 to 2002. Once considered an influential voice in the American Catholic hierarchy and in Boston as a supporter of Church orthodoxy, social justice and ecumenism, a 2002 exposé revealed that he covered up the serial rape of children by Catholic priests. This led to his resignation as Archbishop of Boston in December of that year.

Law previously served as Bishop of Springfield–Cape Girardeau from 1973 to 1984. After resigning from the Archdiocese of Boston, he served in largely ceremonial roles as archpriest of the Basilica di Santa Maria Maggiore from 2004 to 2011 and as Cardinal Priest of Santa Susanna in Rome from 1985 until his death in 2017.

Church documents demonstrate that Law had extensive knowledge of widespread child sexual abuse committed by dozens of Catholic priests in the Boston Archdiocese over almost two decades; he failed to report these crimes to the authorities, instead merely transferring the accused priests between parishes.

== Early life and education ==
Law was born in Torreón, Coahuila, Mexico, on November 4, 1931, the only child of Bernard Aloysius Law and Helen A. Law (née Stubblefield). His father was a United States Air Force colonel and a veteran pilot of World War I.

Law grew up on military bases in the United States and Latin America. He attended schools in New York; Florida; Georgia; Barranquilla, Colombia; and graduated from Charlotte Amalie High School in Saint Thomas, U.S. Virgin Islands. While in high school, he was employed by The Virgin Islands Daily News. He graduated from Harvard College with a major in medieval history before studying philosophy at Saint Joseph Seminary College in St. Benedict, Louisiana, from 1953 to 1955, and theology at the Pontifical College Josephinum in Worthington, Ohio, from 1955 to 1961.

== Priestly ministry in the civil rights era ==
On May 21, 1961, Law was ordained a priest for the Diocese of Natchez-Jackson in Mississippi. He served two years as an assistant pastor of St. Paul's Catholic Church in Vicksburg, Mississippi, where he was the editor of The Mississippi Register, the diocesan newspaper. He also held several other diocesan posts from 1963 to 1968, including director of the family life bureau and spiritual director of the minor seminary.

The young Fr. Law was a civil rights activist.

He was a member of the Mississippi Leadership Conference and the Mississippi Human Relations Council. For his civil rights activities and his strong positions on civil rights in the Mississippi Register, of which he was editor, he received death threats.

Charles Evers, activist and brother of murdered civil rights activist Medgar Evers, praised Law and said he acted "not for the Negro, but for justice and what is right."

Law's civil rights activity led him to develop ties with Protestant church leaders and he received national attention for his work for ecumenism, and in 1968 he was tapped for his first national post, as executive director of the US Bishops' Committee on Ecumenical and Interreligious Affairs.

== Bishop of Springfield–Cape Girardeau ==
Pope Paul VI named Law bishop of the Springfield–Cape Girardeau in Missouri on October 22, 1973, and he was consecrated on December 5 of that year. Law's predecessor in Springfield–Cape Girardeau was William Wakefield Baum, another future cardinal.

In 1975, he arranged for the resettlement in his diocese of 166 Vietnamese refugees who arrived in the United States, and were members of a Vietnamese religious congregation, the Congregation of the Mother Co-Redemptrix.

In continuing his ecumenical work, Law formed the Missouri Christian Leadership Conference. He was made a member of the Vatican's Secretariat for Promoting Christian Unity and served from 1976 to 1981 as a consultor to its Commission for Religious Relations with the Jews. In the late 1970s, Law would also chair the U.S. bishops' Committee on Ecumenical and Interreligious Affairs.

In 1981, Law was named the Vatican delegate to develop and oversee a program instituted by the Congregation for the Doctrine of the Faith in which U.S. Episcopal priests would be accepted into the Catholic priesthood. In the program's first year, sixty-four Episcopal priests applied for acceptance. This brought married priests with their families into U.S. Catholic dioceses for the first time.

== Archbishop of Boston ==
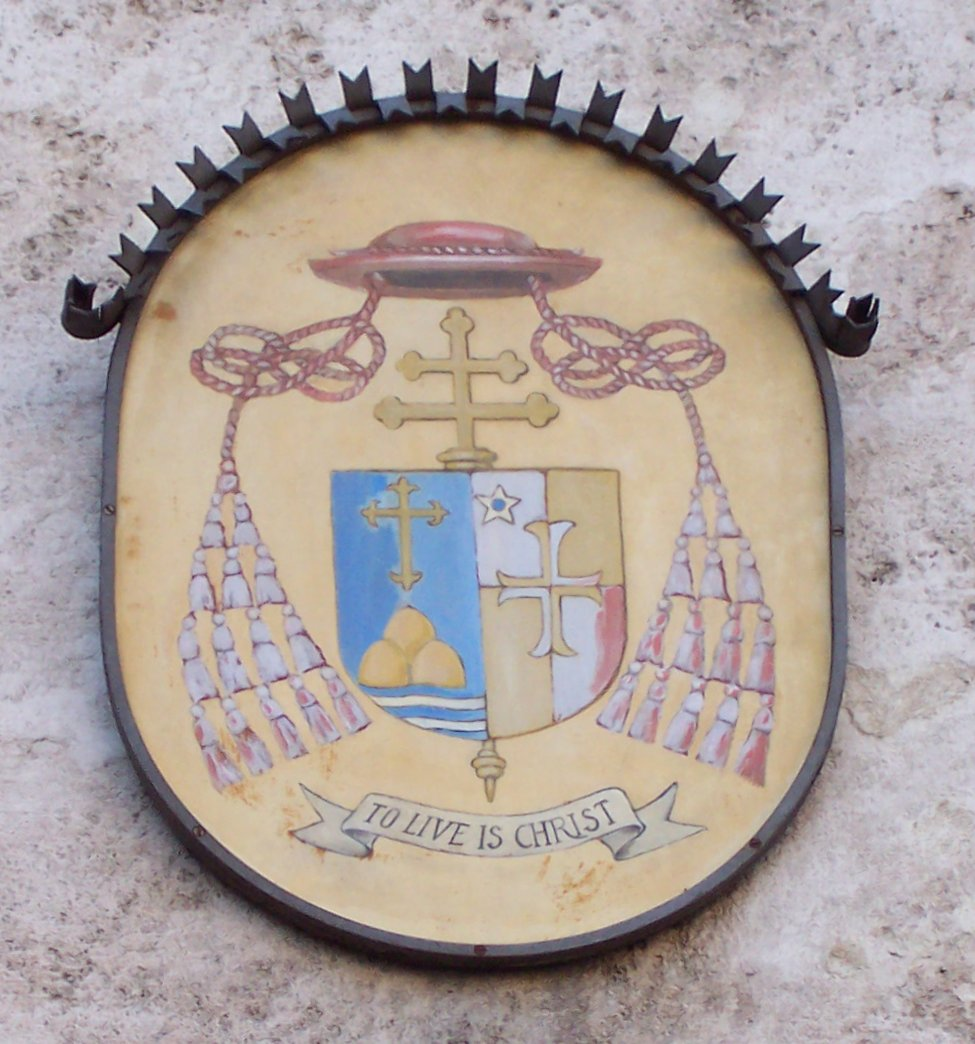
Coat of arms of Cardinal Bernard Law, with his motto "To live is Christ", in front of Santa Susanna

On January 11, 1984, Law was appointed Archbishop of Boston by Pope John Paul II and was installed on March 23, 1984.

That same year, Law reassigned a local priest, Fr John Geoghan, to St. Julia's in Weston, on the recommendation of medical professionals. Geoghan had previously been known to abuse children, and at least one auxiliary bishop in Boston warned Law that the priest was unfit to return to parish ministry.

On May 25, 1985, Law was created Cardinal-Priest of Santa Susanna as his titular church.

In 1985, delivering one of the few speeches in Latin at the Synod of Bishops, he called for the creation of a "universal catechism" to guard against dissent, especially by theologians. He was the second prelate to call for such a document, which became the Catechism of the Catholic Church (1992). Law oversaw the first draft of its English translation.

In the mid-1980s, Law chaired the bishops' Committee on Pastoral Research and Practices at the time it distributed a report on Freemasonry. The bishops' report concluded that "the principles and basic rituals of Masonry embody a naturalistic religion, active participation in which is incompatible with Christian faith and practice".

In 1989, Geoghan was once again removed from ministry due to continued child sex abuse, but was later allowed to return to St Julia's. Further incidents resulted in his permanent removal in 1993, and his defrocking in 1998.

=== Sex abuse scandal exposés ===
In January 2001, Law was named a defendant in several high-profile cases involving pedophile priests, including one involving Geoghan. Reporter Kristen Lombardi, who was assigned to investigate by Susan Ryan-Vollmar, the editor of the Boston Phoenix weekly, wrote "Cardinal sin", an article about the cases.

Mark Keane, a victim of Geoghan, believed that Law had direct knowledge that Geoghan, who worked in the Archdiocese of Boston from 1962 to 1993, was repeatedly molesting children. Keane said that the archbishop not only allowed the priest to continue working, but repeatedly moved him from parish to parish where he had daily contact with many children (one of whom was Keane).

Even though abuse by Geoghan had been reported repeatedly in the media since 1996, the new editor of the daily Boston Globe newspaper Martin Baron set the Spotlight investigatory team to work on the case in September 2001. Lombardi acknowledged that the Globe may have had the story before she did, but was delayed somewhat pending the release of sealed records.

=== Resignation ===
In April 2002, following the Boston Globe's public exposure of the cover-up by Cardinal Law (and his predecessor Cardinal Humberto Medeiros) of offending priests in the Boston Archdiocese, Law consulted with Pope John Paul II and other Vatican officials and said he was committed to staying on as archbishop and addressing the scandal: "It is my intent to address at length the record of the Archdiocese's handling of these cases by reviewing the past in as systematic and comprehensive way as possible, so that legitimate questions which have been raised might be answered."

Even so, Law submitted his resignation as Archbishop of Boston to the Vatican, which Pope John Paul II accepted on December 13, 2002. Law wrote in a personal declaration, "The particular circumstances of this time suggest a quiet departure. Please keep me in your prayers." and moved to Rome. In July 2003, Seán O'Malley, OFMCap was named the new Archbishop of Boston.

The Boston Globe said in an editorial the day after Law's resignation was accepted that "Law had become the central figure in a scandal of criminal abuse, denial, payoff, and coverup that resonates around the world". A letter urging Law's resignation had been signed by 58 priests, mostly diocesan priests who had sworn obedience to Law as their direct superior; the editorial said that this letter was "surely one of the precipitating events in his departure". The Globe's exposé of the scandal was the subject of an Oscar-winning film, Spotlight released in the United States in November 2015, in which Law was portrayed by Len Cariou.

In a statement, Cardinal Law said, "It is my fervent prayer that [my resignation] may help the Archdiocese of Boston to experience the healing, reconciliation and unity which are so desperately needed. To all those who have suffered from my shortcomings and mistakes I both apologize and from them beg forgiveness." While no longer Archbishop of Boston, Law remained a bishop and cardinal of the Catholic Church in good standing; as a cardinal, he participated in the 2005 papal conclave. By the time of the 2013 papal conclave, he had become ineligible to vote as he was over the age of 80.

== Roman Appointment ==
Within weeks of his resignation, Law moved from Boston to Rome. When the state attorney general issued his report titled Child Sexual Abuse in the Archdiocese of Boston (July 23, 2003), he severely criticized Law, mentioning that "the Archdiocese has shown an institutional reluctance to adequately address the problem and, in fact, made choices that allowed the abuse to continue," but did not allege that Law had tried to evade investigation. He said that Cardinal Law had not broken any laws, because the law requiring abuse to be reported was not expanded to include priests until 2002.

Law was a member of the Congregations for the Oriental Churches, the Clergy, Divine Worship and Discipline of the Sacraments, Evangelisation of Peoples, Institutes of Consecrated Life and Societies of Apostolic Life, Catholic Education, Bishops as well as the Pontifical Council for the Family. He held membership in all these congregations and of the council before resigning from the governance of the Archdiocese of Boston, and at that time was also a member of the Pontifical Council for Culture. He became even more influential in those Vatican congregations and, being based in Rome, he could attend all their meetings, unlike cardinals based in other countries.

In May 2004, Pope John Paul II appointed Law to a post in Rome, as Archpriest of the Basilica di Santa Maria Maggiore, a largely ceremonial role. Some saw this as an attempt to shield Law from potential criminal prosecution as his new position conveyed citizenship in Vatican City.

Law reached 80 on November 4, 2011, and lost the right to participate in a papal conclave as well as his memberships in offices of the Roman Curia. He remained as archpriest of the Basilica di Santa Maria Maggiore until November 21, 2011, when Archbishop Santos Abril y Castelló was appointed as the new archpriest.

In Rome, Law was considered an active and important conservative voice within many of the Vatican offices in which he served. Robert Mickens, a longtime Vatican journalist, reported that Law believed he had been "badly done by", and that other cardinals saw him as a victim rather than a guilty party. Until his retirement, Mickens said, "He did not lose his influence. He was a member of more congregations than any other bishop ... Cardinals that are members of these offices can't always go to the meetings — they don't live in Rome — but Bernie Law did and he goes everywhere and he keeps his head held high."

== Retirement and death ==
It was "commonly believed that [Law would] live out his retirement in Rome" (when he reached 80 years of age). After his retirement in 2011, Law continued to live in Vatican City, and regularly attended the annual July 4 Independence Day parties held by the United States Embassy to the Holy See.

In March 2013, Law was living at the Basilica di Santa Maria Maggiore. As of 2015, he was living in the Palazzo della Cancelleria. He visited the United States for the last time in August 2015 for the funeral of Cardinal William Wakefield Baum in Washington, D.C.

In May 2012, the National Catholic Reporter and The Tablet, a British Catholic weekly, reported that Law was "the person in Rome most forcefully supporting" Baltimore Archbishop William E. Lori's petition to investigate and discipline the Leadership Conference of Women Religious, a large group of American nuns.

After a long illness, Law died in Rome on December 20, 2017, at the age of 86. He is buried in a chapel at the Basilica of Santa Maria Maggiore. His funeral rites, following the standard for a cardinal who dies in Rome, included Mass in St. Peter's Basilica on December 21 at which Pope Francis said the final prayers. Vatican TV did not livestream the Mass as it normally does.

Upon his death, his successor as Archbishop of Boston, Cardinal Seán O'Malley, OFMCap, said it was "unfortunate" that Law "had such a high-profile place in the life of the Church". He speculated that today Law would not receive the sort of Vatican appointments he enjoyed after leaving Boston "but unfortunately we're living with the consequences of that".

The Guardian noted at the time that Law had become "a symbol of the Roman Catholic Church's systematic protection of paedophile priests" because of his refusal to stop sexual abuse in Boston.

== In popular culture ==
Law is portrayed by Len Cariou in the 2015 biographical drama Spotlight.

== See also ==
Catholic Church titles
Preceded by Carlo Furno	Archpriest of the Basilica di Santa Maria Maggiore; May 27, 2004 – November 21, 2011	Succeeded by Santos Abril y Castelló
Preceded by Humberto Sousa Medeiros	Archbishop of Boston; 1984–2002	Succeeded by Seán Patrick O'Malley, OFMCap
Preceded by William Wakefield Baum	Bishop of Springfield–Cape Girardeau; 1973–1984	Succeeded by John Joseph Leibrecht
