= Seth Wand =

American football player (born 1979)

No. 78, 72, 65, 75
- Position: Offensive tackle

Personal information
- Born: August 6, 1979 (age 47); Springfield, Missouri, U.S.
- Listed height: 6 ft 7 in (2.01 m)
- Listed weight: 330 lb (150 kg)

Career information
- High school: Springfield Catholic (MO)
- College: Northwest Missouri State
- NFL draft: 2003: 3rd round, 75th overall pick

Career history
- Houston Texans (2003–2005); Tennessee Titans (2006); Oakland Raiders (2007–2008); Oakland Raiders (2009)*; Florida Tuskers/Virginia Destroyers (2009–2011); Oakland Raiders (2011)*
- * Offseason or practice squad member only

Awards and highlights
- UFL champion (2011); First-team All-MIAA (2002); MIAA Hall of Fame (2021); Missouri Sports Hall of Fame (2023)

Career NFL statistics
- Games played: 53
- Games started: 18
- Fumble recoveries: 1
- Stats at Pro Football Reference

Seth Phillip Wand (born August 6, 1979) is an American former professional football player who was an offensive tackle in the National Football League (NFL). He was selected by the Houston Texans in the third round of the 2003 NFL draft. He played college football at Northwest Missouri State. Wand also played for the Tennessee Titans and Florida Tuskers. In 2021, he was inducted to the Mid-America Intercollegiate Athletics Association Hall of Fame. In 2023, it was announced Wand would be inducted into the Missouri Sports Hall of Fame.

== Early life ==
Wand attended Springfield Catholic High School in Springfield, Missouri, and was a student and a letterman in football and basketball. He played offensive tackle and defensive end for the Springfield Catholic Fighting Irish. He played football for the Northwest Missouri State Bearcats. Seth was a left tackle for the Bearcats, allowing only one sack in his four years on the team.

== Professional career ==
Pre-draft measurables
| Height | Weight | Arm length | Hand span | 40-yard dash | 10-yard split | 20-yard split | 20-yard shuttle | Three-cone drill | Vertical jump | Broad jump | Bench press |
|---|---|---|---|---|---|---|---|---|---|---|---|
| 6 ft 7 in (2.01 m) | 321 lb (146 kg) | 34 1/2 in (0.88 m) | 10 1/2 in (0.27 m) | 5.12 s | 1.75 s | 2.95 s | 4.50 s | 7.61 s | 31 1/2 in (0.80 m) | 8 ft 11 in (2.72 m) | 20 reps |
All values from NFL Combine.

=== Houston Texans ===
Wand was selected by the Houston Texans in the third round of the 2003 NFL draft. He started his second season, but was waived three years later on September 2, 2006.

=== Tennessee Titans ===
Wand then had a stint with the Tennessee Titans during the 2006 season. He was waived during final cuts on September 1, 2007.

=== Oakland Raiders (first stint) ===
On November 21, 2007, Wand signed with the Oakland Raiders. He was released by the team prior to the 2008 regular season opener on September 8, only to be re-signed two days later when offensive lineman Paul McQuistan was placed on injured reserve. On October 6, Wand was placed on injured reserve.

Wand was re-signed on August 5, 2009, after an injury to offensive tackle Khalif Barnes. He was released on September 5.

=== Florida Tuskers ===
Wand was selected by the Florida Tuskers of the United Football League in the UFL Premiere Season Draft in 2009.

=== Oakland Raiders (second stint) ===
On August 2, 2011, Wand re-signed with the Raiders. On September 4, 2011, Wand was cut by the Oakland Raiders.
