= James Vann Johnston Jr. =

American Catholic prelate (born 1959)

His Excellency, The Most Reverend James Vann Johnston Jr.
- Bishop of Kansas City–Saint Joseph
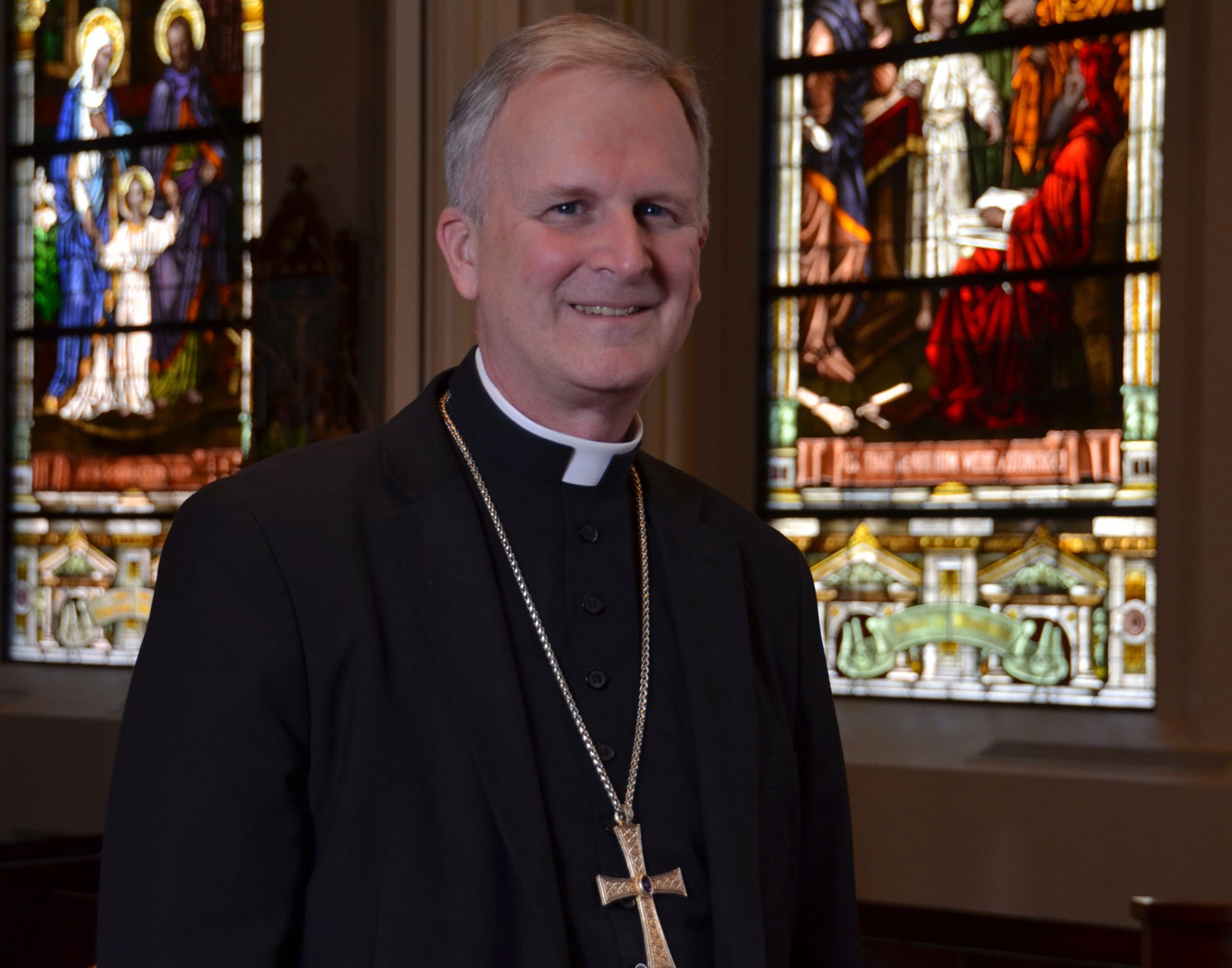
- Diocese: Kansas City–Saint Joseph
- Appointed: September 15, 2015
- Installed: November 4, 2015
- Predecessor: Robert Finn
- Previous post: Bishop of Springfield-Cape Girardeau (2008-2015)

Orders
- Ordination: June 9, 1990 by Anthony O'Connell
- Consecration: March 31, 2008 by Raymond Leo Burke, Joseph Edward Kurtz, John Joseph Leibrecht

Personal details
- Born: October 16, 1959 (age 66) Knoxville, Tennessee, US
- Education: University of Tennessee; Saint Meinrad School of Theology; Catholic University of America
- Motto: Caritas Christi urget nos (Latin for 'The love of Christ inspires us')
- Styles
- Reference style: His Excellency
- Spoken style: Your Excellency
- Religious style: Bishop

James Vann Johnston Jr. (born October 16, 1959) is an American Catholic prelate serving as the Bishop of Kansas City–St. Joseph in Missouri since 2015. He served as the Bishop of Springfield-Cape Girardeau in Missouri from 2008 to 2015.

== Biography ==
=== Early life and education ===
Johnston was born on October 16, 1959, in Knoxville, Tennessee, to James Johnston and Pat (née Huber) Vann Johnston. He has two sisters, Beth and Amy, and one brother, Steve. James Johnston Jr. was a member of the Boy Scouts of America, attaining the rank of Eagle Scout. He attended St. Joseph Elementary School and Knoxville Catholic High School in Knoxville.

After graduating from high school in 1977, Johnston entered the University of Tennessee in Knoxville. He received a Bachelor of Science degree in electrical engineering in 1982. Johnston worked for three years after college for an engineering consulting firm in Houston, Texas.

Johnston has stated that his mother's faith and generosity and the teachings of Pope John Paul II inspired him to enter the priesthood. He enrolled in Saint Meinrad School of Theology in Indiana in 1985, where he earned a Master of Divinity degree in 1990.

=== Priesthood ===
Johnston was ordained a priest for the Diocese of Knoxville by Bishop Anthony O'Connell on June 9, 1990, at Holy Ghost Church in Knoxville.

In 1994, Johnston briefly studied in Washington, D.C. at Catholic University of America (CUA). He graduated from the School of Canon Law in 1996 with a Licentiate of Canon Law. He then served as an associate pastor at St. Mary's Parish in Oak Ridge and at St. Jude Parish in Chattanooga, where he also taught at Notre Dame High School. Johnston then returned to Knoxville as associate pastor of Holy Ghost Parish.

In 2002, Johnston and two other priests saved a man and his two children from falling over a waterfall in Glacier National Park in Montana. US Secretary of the Interior Gale Norton awarded them the Citizen's Award for Bravery in February 2005. Upon receiving the award, Johnston remarked, "We were all very surprised, partly because it happened two and a half years ago. We didn't think too many people were even aware of it." Johnston was named chancellor and moderator of the curia in 1996, and later pastor of Our Lady of Fatima Parish in Alcoa, in addition to his curial duties, in May 2007.

=== Bishop of Springfield-Cape Girardeau ===
On January 24, 2008, Johnston was appointed the sixth bishop of Springfield-Cape Girardeau by Pope Benedict XVI. He later stated at a press conference, "I am eager to learn about the Church in Southern Missouri, and to become part of God's family here." Johnston also announced that, as bishop, he would:

"Seek out those who have fallen away from the practice of their Catholic faith, reach out to the unchurched, and seek to meet brothers and sisters of other faith communities and churches on areas of common belief and shared concerns."

Johnston received his episcopal consecration on March 31, 2008, from Archbishop Raymond Burke, with Archbishop Joseph Kurtz and Bishop John Leibrecht serving as co-consecrators.

=== Bishop of Kansas City-St. Joseph ===
On September 15, 2015, Pope Francis named Johnston as bishop of Kansas City-St. Joseph. He was installed on November 4, 2015, in the Cathedral of the Immaculate Conception in Kansas City.

On June 27, 2016, in a special church service, Johnston apologized to victims of sexual abuse in the diocese for the abuse itself and the cover-up by the church. His predecessor, Bishop Robert Finn, had pleaded guilty in 2012 to a charge of failing to report an individual abusing a child.In March 2021, Johnston announced the laicization in December 2020 of Reverend Michael Tierney, who had multiple credible accusations of sexual abuse of children.

=== Personal life ===
Johnston supports the celebration of the Tridentine Mass, but has said he does not "hold a great personal attachment to it" due to his relatively young age. He also supports the use of Gregorian chant and polyphony during Mass. He has cited Dolly Parton, Chet Atkins, and Alan Jackson as some of his favorite musical artists.

== Viewpoints ==
=== Abortion ===
In May 2009, noting that US President Barack Obama "has taken steps on multiple fronts to undermine the protection of innocent human life", Johnston said the decision of the University of Notre Dame to have Obama deliver the commencement speech at its graduation ceremony and receive an honorary degree was "saddening and bewildering." Johnston also said,

"While we must pray for our president, respect his office, and acknowledge and support the good things he does to lead our nation, it is also our duty to make known our opposition to those actions and decisions that stand in direct opposition to the moral law and the foundational principals of America."

On September 14, 2020, just before the 2020 US presidential election, Johnston sent a controversial letter to parishioners in the diocese. In the letter, Johnston asked voters to examine which party supported so-called moral issues such as abortion rights. When asked if he was endorsing Republican Party candidates, Johnston said that he was only asking voters to vote with their conscience.

=== Same sex marriage ===
In May 2009, Johnston criticized what he believed was unfair treatment of Miss California Carrie Prejean, who placed second at Miss USA 2009 competition. When asked if she supported same-sex marriage, Prejean said no. Johnston remarked:

"...shows just how much American culture, in such a short time, has drifted away from the moorings that have given the nation strength and stability...[and] shows the fierce intolerance of many of those who advocate redefining marriage to include same-sex unions."

== Episcopal succession ==
Catholic Church titles
Preceded by Robert Finn	Bishop of Kansas City–Saint Joseph; 2015–present	Succeeded by Incumbent
Preceded by John Joseph Leibrecht	Bishop of Springfield-Cape Girardeau; 2008–2015	Succeeded by Edward M. Rice
