= Diocese of Springfield–Cape Girardeau =

Latin Catholic ecclesiastical jurisdiction in Missouri, USA

Coordinates: 37°11′00″N 93°17′10″W

Diocese of Springfield–Cape Girardeau Dioecesis Campifontis–Capitis Girardeauensis
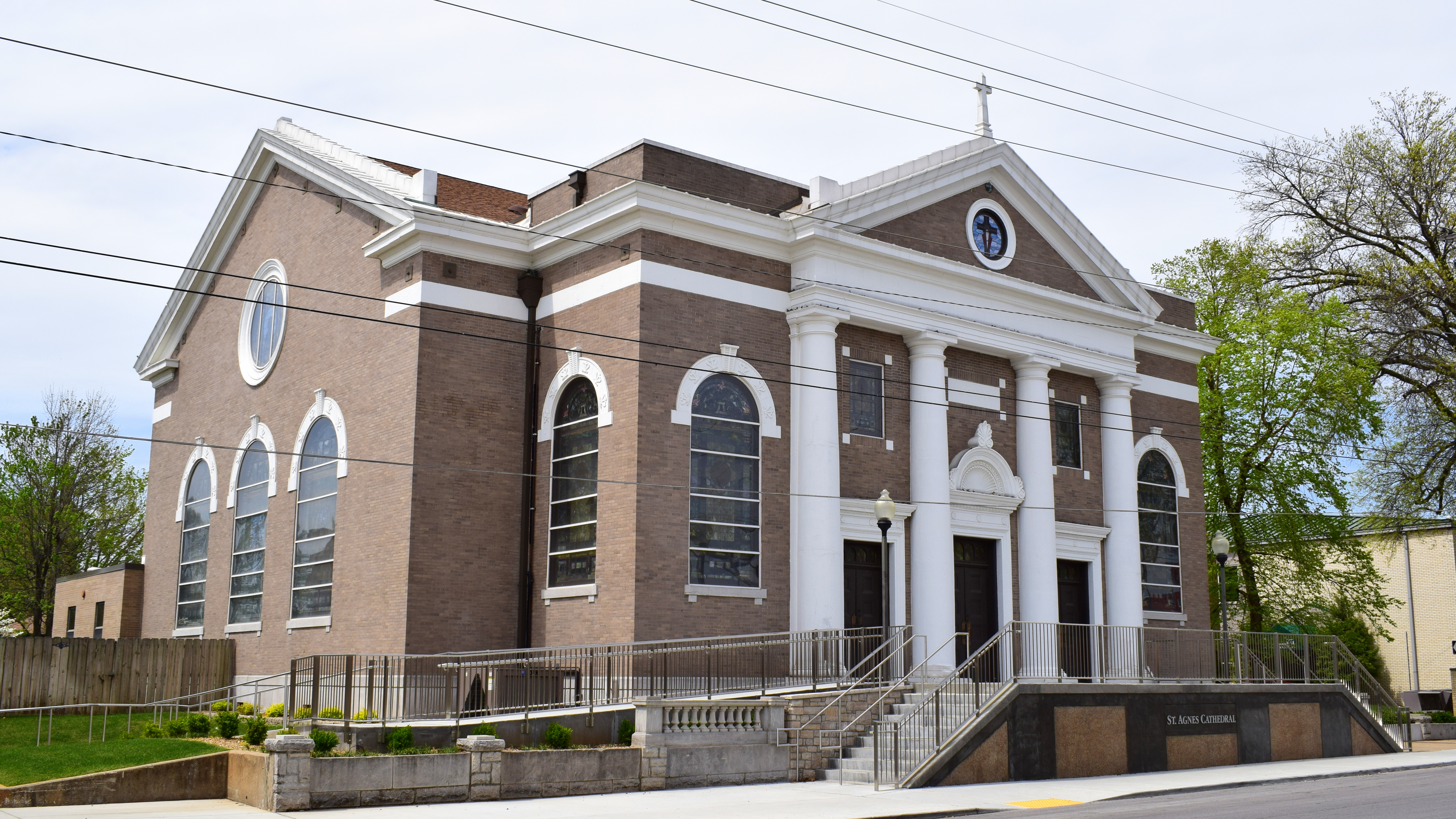
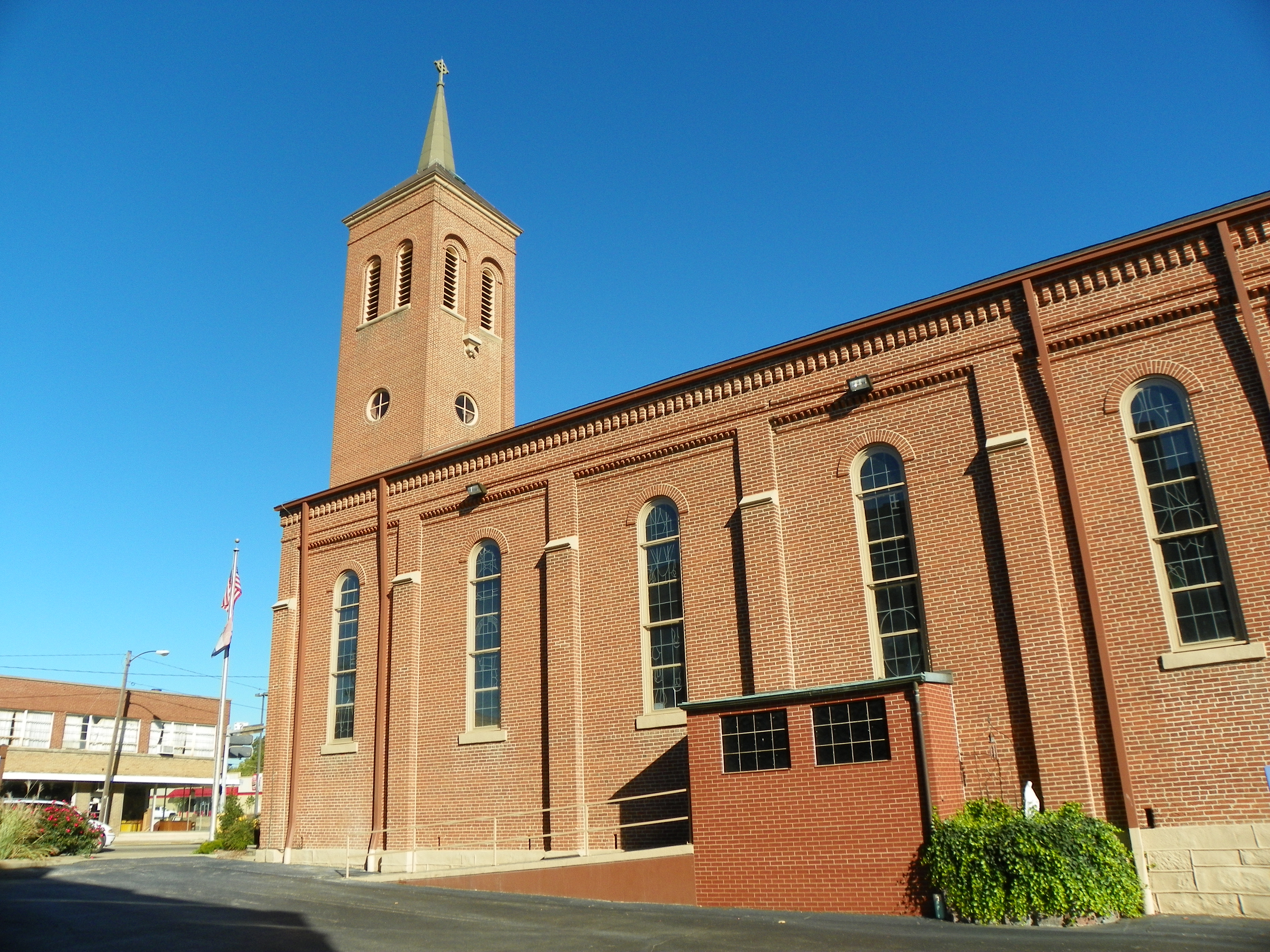
- St. Agnes Cathedral, Springfield Cathedral of St. Mary of the Annunciation, Cape Girardeau

- Coat of arms

Location
- Country: United States
- Territory: 39 counties across Southern Missouri
- Ecclesiastical province: St. Louis

Statistics
- Area: 25,719 km^{2} (9,930 sq mi)
- Population: Total; Catholics: (as of 2010); 1,269,180; 68,217 (5.4%)
- Parishes: 66

Information
- Denomination: Catholic
- Sui iuris church: Latin Church
- Rite: Roman Rite
- Established: August 24, 1956 (69 years ago)
- Cathedral: St. Agnes Cathedral (Springfield)
- Co-cathedral: Cathedral of St. Mary of the Annunciation (Cape Girardeau)
- Patron saint: Rose Philippine Duchesne, Pope Pius X

Current leadership
- Pope: Leo XIV
- Bishop: Edward M. Rice
- Metropolitan Archbishop: Mitchell T. Rozanski
- Bishops emeritus: John Joseph Leibrecht

Map
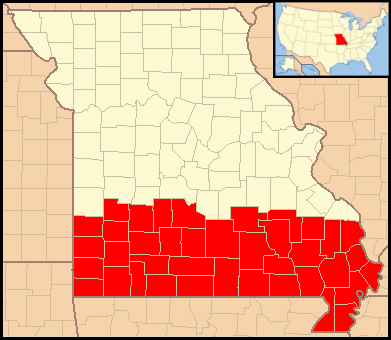

Website
- dioscg.org

The Diocese of Springfield–Cape Girardeau (Latin: Dioecesis Campifontis–Capitis Girardeauensis) is a diocese of the Catholic Church in southern Missouri in the United States. It is a suffragan diocese of the Archdiocese of Saint Louis. The bishop is Edward M. Rice. The diocese has two cathedrals, St. Agnes Cathedral in Springfield and the Cathedral of St. Mary of the Annunciation in Cape Girardeau.

== Demographics ==
The Diocese of Springfield-Cape Girardeau consists of 39 primarily rural counties in the southern third of Missouri. It includes the cities of Springfield, Branson and Cape Girardeau. This region includes the Ozarks and Bootheel of Missouri, where Catholics make up about 5% of the total population.

As of 2023, the diocese included 66 parishes, 17 missions and a Catholic population of approximately 66,000.

== History ==
=== 1600 to 1900 ===
The first Catholic presence in Missouri was that of European explorers in the 17th century traveling the Mississippi River. In present-day Hannibal, Missouri, the first Catholic masses were celebrated by the Belgian missionary, Louis Hennepin, in 1680 at Bay de Charles. At that time, all of Missouri was part of the French colony of Louisiana. Up until the early 19th century, Catholics in this region were first under the French jurisdiction of the Diocese of Quebec, then Spanish jurisdiction under the Diocese of Louisiana and the Two Floridas.

With the Louisiana Purchase of 1804, Missouri passed from France to the United States. In 1826, Pope Leo XII erected the Diocese of St. Louis, covering the new state of Missouri along with vast areas of the American Great Plains. The southern Missouri area would remain part of this diocese and later the Diocese of Kansas City for the next 130 years.

In 1825, John Timon celebrated the first mass in Cape Girardeau and in 1833 dedicated the first church there. The oldest parish in Springfield, Immaculate Conception, was established in 1868. In Joplin, the first Catholic church was started in 1878. Our Lady of the Lake, the only Catholic church in Branson, was dedicated in 1922.

=== 1900 to 1973 ===
Pope Pius XII erected the Diocese of Springfield-Cape Girardeau on August 24, 1956, taking its territory from the Archdiocese of St. Louis and the Diocese of Kansas City. The pope named Auxiliary Bishop Charles Helmsing of St. Louis as the first bishop of the new diocese. In 1962, Helmsing became bishop of the Diocese of Kansas City-Saint Joseph.

The second bishop of Springfield-Cape Girardeau was Ignatius Jerome Strecker from the Diocese of Wichita, named by Pope John XXIII in 1962. Strecker was elevated to archbishop of the Archdiocese of Kansas City (in Kansas) in 1969.

To replace Strecker in Springfield-Cape Girardeau, Pope Paul VI appointed William Baum. Baum served in this position for only three years before being named archbishop of the Archdiocese of Washington in 1973.

=== 1973 to present ===
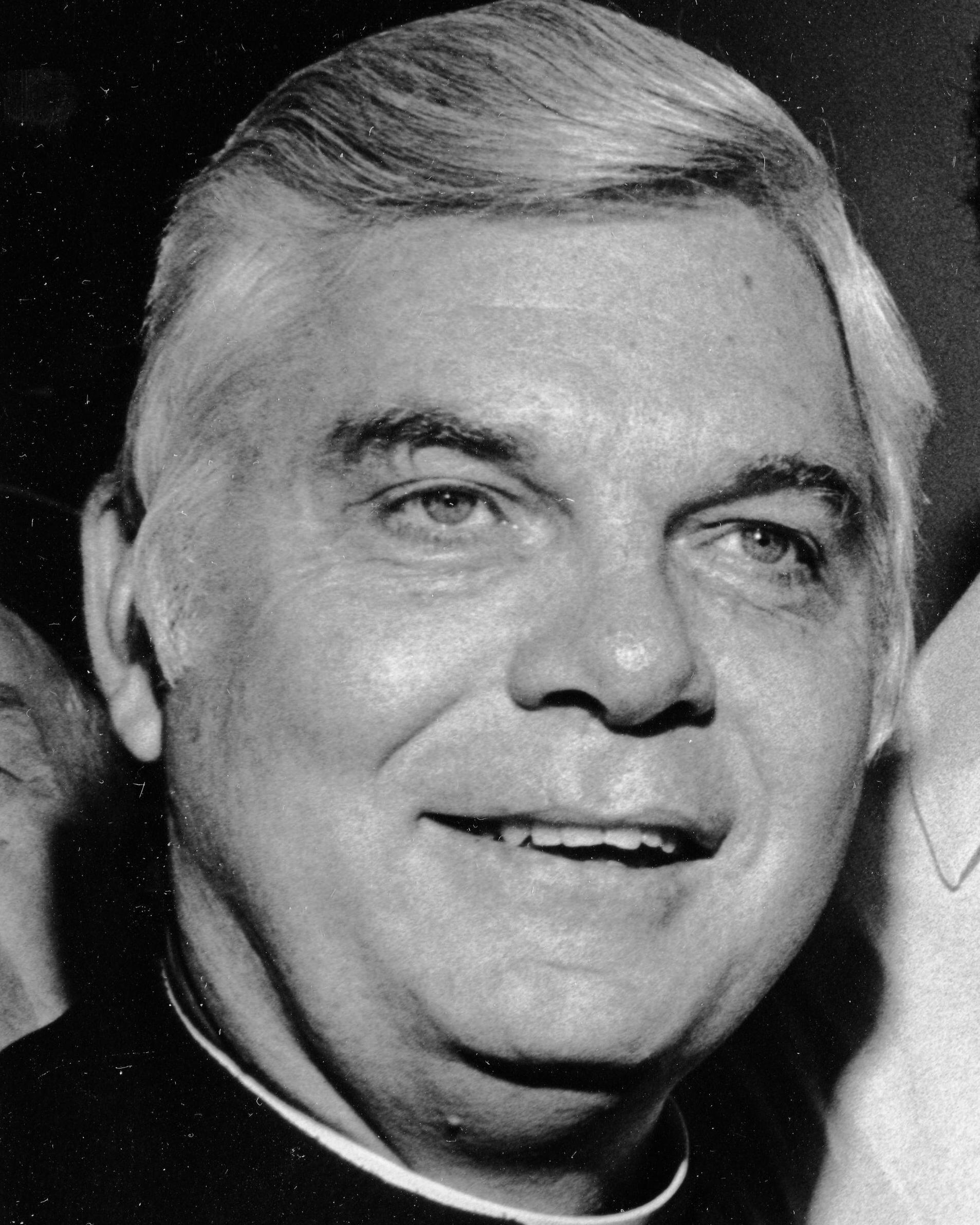
Cardinal Law (2013)

Bishop Bernard Law of the Diocese of Natchez-Jackson replaced Baum. In 1975, Law sponsored the immigration of the Vietnamese priests and brothers of the Congregation of the Mother Coredemptrix to the United States. They had been expelled from South Vietnam by the Government of Vietnam after the end of the Vietnam War. Law leased the former Our Lady of the Ozarks College in Carthage to the Congregation for one dollar a year to use as their monastery and shrine to the Immaculate Heart of Mary. Law also formed the Missouri Christian Leadership Conference. In 1984, Law became archbishop of the Archdiocese of Boston.

John Joseph Leibrecht of St. Louis became the fifth bishop of Springfield-Cape Girardeau in 1984, appointed by Pope John Paul II. After 23 years of service as bishop, Leibrecht retired in 2008. The next bishop in the diocese was James Vann Johnston Jr. of the Diocese of Knoxville, named by Pope Benedict XVI in 2008. He was appointed in 2015 as bishop of Kansas City-Saint Joseph.

The current bishop of Springfield-Cape Girardeau is Edward M. Rice, formerly an auxiliary bishop of St. Louis. He was appointed by Pope Francis in 2016.

=== Reports of sex abuse ===
The Diocese of Springfield-Cape Girardeau announced in 2013 that it had received a credible accusation of sexual abuse of a minor from the 1960s against Walter C. Craig, who died in 1971.

In April 2019, the diocese released a list of 19 clergy with credible accusations of sexual abuse of minor. Bishop Rice said that the diocese had spent over $300,000 settling sexual abuse claims since 1989.

== Bishops ==
1. Charles Herman Helmsing (1956–1962), appointed Bishop of Kansas City-Saint Joseph
2. Ignatius Jerome Strecker (1962–1969), appointed Archbishop of Kansas City in Kansas
3. William Wakefield Baum (1970–1973), appointed Archbishop of Washington and later Prefect of the Congregation for Catholic Education and Major Penitentiary of the Apostolic Penitentiary (elevated to Cardinal in 1976)
4. Bernard Francis Law (1973–1984), appointed Archbishop of Boston and later Archpriest of the Basilica of Saint Mary Major (created a Cardinal in 1985)
5. John Joseph Leibrecht (1984–2008)
6. James Vann Johnston, Jr. (2008–2015), appointed Bishop of Kansas City-Saint Joseph
7. Edward M. Rice (2016–present)

== High schools ==
As of 2025, the Diocese of Springfield-Cape Girardeau has three high schools:

- McAuley Catholic High School – Joplin
- Notre Dame Regional High School – Cape Girardeau
- Springfield Catholic High School – Springfield
