= Edward M. Rice =

American Catholic prelate (born 1960)

His Excellency, The Most Reverend Edward M. Rice
- Bishop of Springfield-Cape Girardeau
- Church: Catholic Church
- Province: Saint Louis
- Diocese: Springfield–Cape Girardeau
- Appointed: April 26, 2016
- Installed: June 1, 2016
- Predecessor: James Vann Johnston Jr.
- Previous post: Auxiliary Bishop of St. Louis and Titular Bishop of Sufes (2011–2016)

Orders
- Ordination: January 3, 1987 by John L. May
- Consecration: January 13, 2011 by Robert James Carlson, John R. Gaydos, Richard Stika

Personal details
- Born: July 28, 1960 (age 66) St. Louis, Missouri, US
- Motto: Venite et videbitus (Latin for 'Come and see')
- Styles
- Reference style: His Excellency
- Spoken style: Your Excellency
- Religious style: Bishop

Edward Matthew Rice (born July 28, 1960) is an American Catholic prelate serving as Bishop of Springfield-Cape Girardeau since 2016. Rice previously served as an auxiliary bishop of the Archdiocese of St. Louis from 2010 to 2016.

== Biography ==
=== Early life and education ===
Rice was born July 28, 1960, in St. Louis, Missouri, one of the ten children of John and Helen (née Madden) Rice. He graduated from St. Mary's High School in St. Louis.

Rich received his Master of Divinity degree from Kenrick School of Theology in Shrewsbury, Missouri, in 1987. Rice was ordained a deacon on May 3, 1986, by Bishop J. Terry Steib.

=== Priestly Ordination and ministry ===
Rice was ordained to the priesthood at the Cathedral Basilica of Saint Louis for the Archdiocese of St. Louis on January 3, 1987, by Archbishop John L. May. The archdiocese assigned Rice as associate pastor at the following parishes in Missouri:

- Our Lady of Presentation in Overland (1987 to 1991)
- St. Mary Magdalen in St. Louis (1991 to 1995). He also joined the faculty at St. Mary's High School during this period.

In 1995, Rice became assistant director of Cardinal Glennon College in Shrewsbury, the minor seminary of the archdiocese. He was named director of Cardinal Glennon in 1996. Rice left Cardinal Glennon in 2000 after his appointment as pastor of St. John the Baptist Parish in St. Louis.

In 2008, Rice was named director of the Office of Vocations for the archdiocese. On July 2, 2008, Rice was appointed by the Vatican as a chaplain of His Holiness with the title monsignor.

=== Auxiliary Bishop of St. Louis ===
On December 1, 2010, Pope Benedict XVI appointed Rice as an auxiliary bishop of Saint Louis and titular bishop of Sufes. He was consecrated on January 13, 2011, at the Cathedral Basilica of Saint Louis in St. Louis. Archbishop Robert Carlson was the principal consecrator. Bishops John R. Gaydos and Richard F. Stika were the principal co-consecrators.

=== Bishop of Springfield-Cape Girardeau ===
On April 26, 2016, Pope Francis appointed Rice as bishop of Springfield-Cape Girardeau. His installation took place June 1, 2016, at St. Elizabeth Ann Seton Church in Springfield, Missouri.

== Episcopal succession ==
Catholic Church titles
Preceded by James Vann Johnston, Jr.	Bishop of Springfield-Cape Girardeau; 2016–present	Succeeded by Incumbent
Preceded by –	Auxiliary Bishop of St. Louis; 2010–2016	Succeeded by –
