= Joseph John Fox =

American prelate

His Excellency, The Right Reverend Joseph John Fox
- Bishop of Green Bay; Titular Bishop of Ionopolis
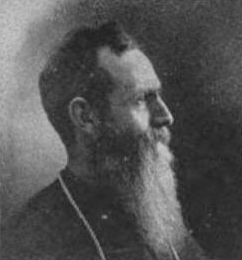
- See: Diocese of Green Bay
- In office: 1904–1914
- Predecessor: Sebastian Gebhard Messmer
- Successor: Paul Peter Rhode

Orders
- Ordination: June 7, 1879 by Charles André Anthonis
- Consecration: June 25, 1905 by Sebastian Messmer

Personal details
- Born: August 2, 1855 Green Bay, Wisconsin, US
- Died: March 14, 1915 (aged 59) Chicago, Illinois, US
- Denomination: Roman Catholic
- Parents: Paul and Frances (née Bartel) Fox
- Education: St. Francis Seminary; American College of Louvain

Joseph John Fox (August 2, 1855 – March 14, 1915) was an American prelate of the Roman Catholic Church who served as bishop of the Diocese of Green Bay in Wisconsin from 1904 until his death in 1914.

== Biography ==
=== Early life ===
Joseph Fox was born in Green Bay, Wisconsin, to Paul and Frances (née Bartel) Fox, who were German immigrants. He received his early education at the parochial school of the Cathedral of St. Francis Xavier in his native city. He made his classical studies at St. Francis Seminary in Milwaukee from 1870 to 1875. He then studied philosophy and theology at the American College of Louvain in Leuven, Belgium.

=== Priesthood ===
Fox was ordained to the priesthood in Mechelen, Belgium, by Bishop Charles André Anthonis for the Diocese of Green Bay on June 7, 1879.

Fox's first assignment, following his return to Wisconsin, was as pastor of St. Kilian Parish in New Franken, where he remained for eight months. He afterwards served at St. John the Baptist Parish in Green Bay for three years, in addition to serving as secretary to Bishop Francis Krautbauer. In 1883, Fox became pastor of Our Lady of Lourdes Parish in Marinette, Wisconsin, serving there for eleven years. He served as vicar general of the diocese from 1894 to 1904, and was named a domestic prelate by Pope Leo XIII in 1898.

=== Bishop of Green Bay ===
On May 27, 1904, Fox was appointed the fifth bishop of Green Bay by Pope Pius X. He received his episcopal consecration at Saint Francis Xavier Cathedral in Green Bay on June 25, 1904, from Archbishop Sebastian Messmer, with Bishops William Stang and Frederick Eis serving as co-consecrators. He was the first and only native son of the diocese to become its bishop. During his tenure, Fox built a new episcopal residence, which later became the diocesan chancery (now demolished), and displayed a strong interest in education and advancing the parochial school system. Fox was a contributor to the Catholic Encyclopedia.

=== Retirement and death ===
On November 7, 1914, Pope Benedict XV accepted Fox's resignation as bishop of Green Bay and appointed him as Titular Bishop of Ionopolis. Joseph Fox died in Chicago on March 14, 1915, at age 59.

== See also ==
- Catholic Church hierarchy
- Catholic Church in the United States
- Historical list of the Catholic bishops of the United States
- List of Catholic bishops of the United States
- Lists of patriarchs, archbishops, and bishops

== Notes ==
Catholic Church titles
Preceded by Sebastian Gebhard Messmer	Bishop of Green Bay; 1904–1914	Succeeded by Paul Peter Rhode
