= Robert F. Morneau =

The Most Reverend Robert Fealey Morneau
- Auxiliary Bishop Emeritus of Green Bay
- See: Diocese of Green Bay
- Appointed: December 19, 1978
- Installed: February 22, 1979
- Retired: October 7, 2013

Orders
- Ordination: May 28, 1966
- Consecration: February 22, 1979 by Aloysius John Wycislo, Mark Francis Schmitt, and John Benjamin Grellinger

Personal details
- Born: September 10, 1938 (age 88) New London, Wisconsin, US
- Education: St. Norbert College; Sacred Heart Minor Seminary; Catholic University of America

Styles of Robert Fealey Morneau
- Reference style: His Excellency; The Most Reverend
- Spoken style: Your Excellency
- Religious style: Bishop

Robert Fealey Morneau (born September 10, 1938) is an American prelate of the Roman Catholic Church. Morneau served as an auxiliary bishop of the Diocese of Green Bay from 1978 to 2013.

== Biography ==
=== Early life ===
The fourth of six children, Robert Morneau was born on September 10, 1938, in New London, Wisconsin, to Leroy and Catherine (Fealey) Morneau. After graduating from Bear Creek High School, he studied at St. Norbert College in De Pere, Wisconsin, and Sacred Heart Seminary in Oneida, Wisconsin. Morneau then entered Catholic University of America in Washington, D.C., where he earned both bachelor's and master's degrees.

=== Priesthood ===
Morneau was ordained to the priesthood for the Diocese of Green Bay by Bishop John Grellinger on May 28, 1966.

After his ordination, Morneau worked as an assistant pastor at a parish in New London, Wisconsin. He then took appointments in Manitowoc, Wisconsin, where he served as a faculty member at Silver Lake College. and chaplain at the University of Wisconsin–Green Bay, Manitowoc Campus and Park Town Home. He has also taught at the Summer Theological Institute of St. Norbert College and served on the college's board of trustees.

=== Auxiliary Bishop of Green Bay ===
On December 19, 1978, Pope John Paul II appointed Morneau as an auxiliary bishop of the Diocese of Green Bay and titular bishop of Massa Lubrense. He was consecrated at St. Francis Xavier Cathedral in Green Bay on February 22, 1979, by Bishop Aloysius Wycislo, with Bishops Mark Schmitt and John Grellinger serving as co-consecrators.

Morneau served the diocese as a member of the college of consultors and the diocesan Finance Council; as the vicar for priests and the vicar general; and as pastor of Resurrection Parish in Allouez, Wisconsin.

In 1979, a family complained to Morneau that their child had been sexually abused by Reverend David Boyea. The family only asked for an apology from Boyea, which Morneau obtained. Morneau did not report the allegations to the police or to the public. In 1985, Boyea pleaded guilty to first degree sexual assault of a different child and was sentenced to ten years in prison. In 1986, a $12 million civil suit was filed against Morneau and the diocese by three of Boyea's victims. The diocese eventually settled with the victims. In 1990, Boyea was released from prison and was laicized by the Vatican.

=== Retirement and legacy ===
On September 10, 2013, Morneau turned 75, the retirement age at which bishops must submit a retirement request to the Vatican. On October 7, 2013, Pope Francis accepted his retirement. On September 14, 2018, the Vatican granted Morneau's request to withdraw from public ministry. In a statement, Morneau cited his failure to report Boyea to police in 1979. In a statement, Morneau said:

I failed to report to local authorities an incident of abuse of a minor by a priest in 1979 and, as a result, this priest was able to abuse again several years later. I intend to spend my time in prayer for all victims and survivors of sexual abuse and I will do corporal works of mercy in reparation for what I failed to do.

== See also ==
- Catholic Church hierarchy
- Catholic Church in the United States
- Historical list of the Catholic bishops of the United States
- List of Catholic bishops of the United States
- Lists of patriarchs, archbishops, and bishops

Catholic Church titles
Preceded by –	Auxiliary Bishop of Green Bay; 1979–2013	Succeeded by –
