= Church of St. John the Baptist (Virginia, Minnesota) =

Former church building in Virginia, Minnesota

- Church of St. John the Baptist (Catholic)
- U.S. National Register of Historic Places
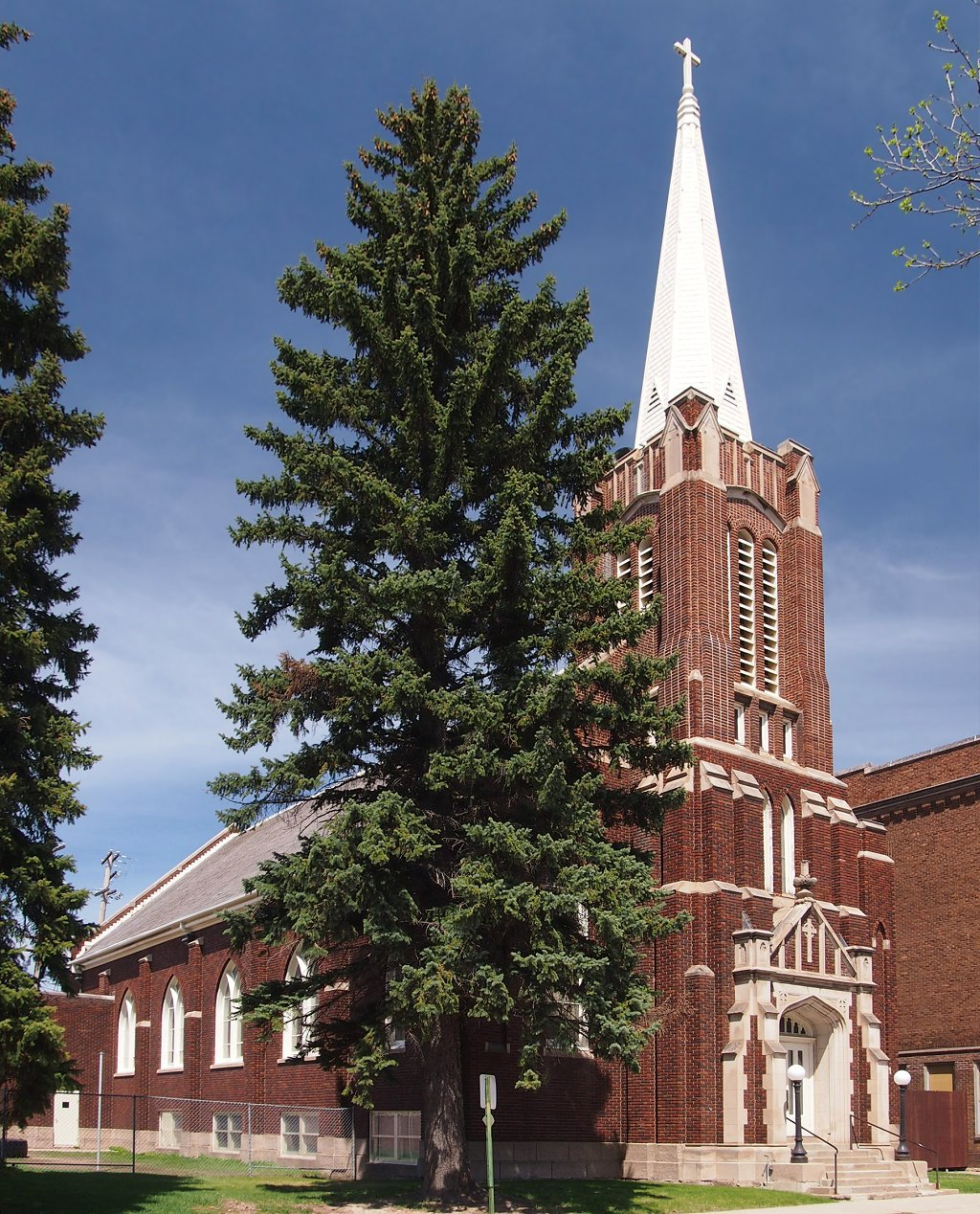
- The Church of St. John the Baptist from the southwest

- Location within Minnesota Location within the United States
- Location: 309 S. 3rd Avenue, Virginia, Minnesota
- Coordinates: 47°31′15″N 92°32′9.5″W
- Area: Less than one acre
- Built: 1924
- Architectural style: Gothic Revival
- NRHP reference No.: 80004362
- Added to NRHP: August 27, 1980

The Church of St. John the Baptist was a historic church building in Virginia, Minnesota, United States. It was built in 1924 by a Polish American congregation of Roman Catholics. In 1980 the church was listed on the National Register of Historic Places under the name Church of St. John the Baptist (Catholic) for its local significance in the themes of religion and social history. It was nominated for serving as the center of religious and social life for Virginia's Polish Americans.

The parish moved to a new building on the same block, the Holy Spirit Catholic Church, in the 1970s. The Church of St. John, little used for years, was demolished in December 2018 to make room for a playground and expanded parking lot for the adjacent parochial school.

== Description ==
The red brick structure contains Gothic Revival elements, with six arched windows on each of the sides and arched windows flanking the main entrance. The steeple above the main entrance has Jacobean styling.

== History ==
The church was built in 1924 and became the center of religious and social life for the Polish immigrants in the city of Virginia. It was consecrated by the first Polish bishop in the United States, Paul Peter Rhode. The church was also used by nonreligious Polish organizations, including the Polish National Alliance.

== See also ==
- List of Catholic churches in the United States
- National Register of Historic Places listings in St. Louis County, Minnesota
