= List of German universities affiliated with Pope Benedict XVI =

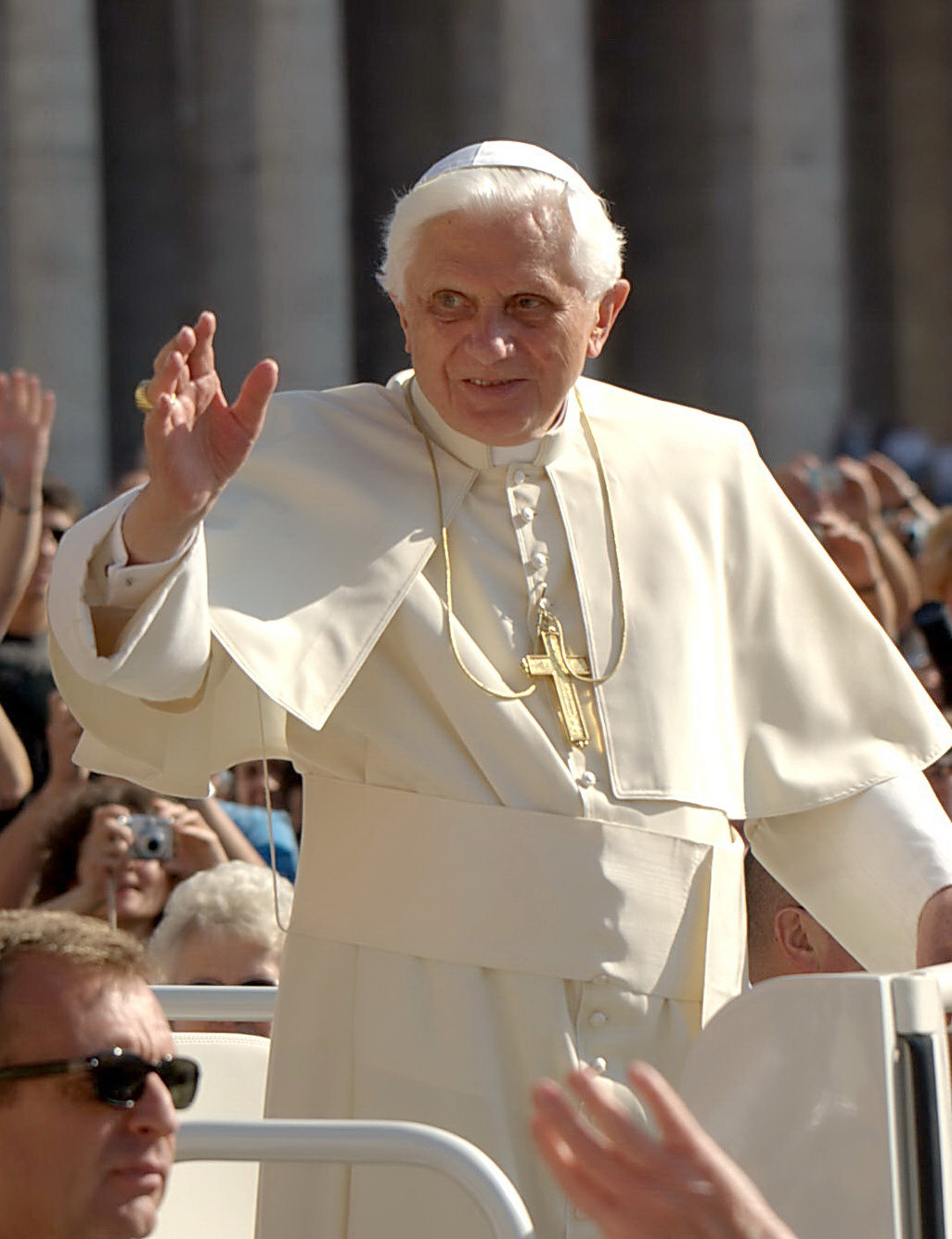
Pope Benedict XVI in 2009

This is a list of universities and seminaries where Pope Benedict XVI studied or taught.

== Studies ==
- Saint Michael Seminary in Traunstein
- College of Freising (Philosophisch-Theologische Hochschule Freising) (1946–1951)
- LMU Munich (seminarian at the Ducal Georgianum until 1951, doctoral thesis 1953, Habilitation 1958)

== As a faculty member ==
- College of Freising (professor 1958–1959)
- University of Bonn (professor 1959–1963)
- University of Münster (professor 1963–1966)
- Eberhard Karls University of Tübingen (professor 1966–1969)
- University of Regensburg (professor 1969–1977, since 1977 listed as an honorary professor)
