= Francis Xavier Krautbauer =

German-born prelate

His Excellency, The Most Reverend Francis Xavier Krautbauer
- Bishop of Green Bay
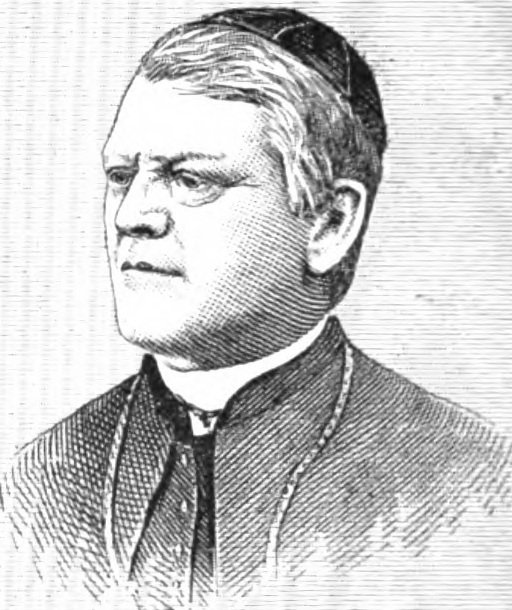
- Church: Catholic
- Diocese: Diocese of Green Bay
- Appointed: February 12, 1875
- Predecessor: Joseph Melcher
- Successor: Frederick Katzer

Orders
- Ordination: July 16, 1850 by Valentin von Ridel
- Consecration: June 29, 1875 by John Martin Henni

Personal details
- Born: January 12, 1824 Mappach, Kingdom of Bavaria
- Died: December 17, 1885 (age 61)
- Education: Ducal Georgianum

Francis Xavier Krautbauer (January 12, 1824 – December 17, 1885) was a German-born prelate of the Catholic Church who served as the second bishop of the Diocese of Green Bay in Wisconsin from 1875 until his death in 1885.

== Biography ==
=== Early life ===
Krautbauer was born on July 16, 1850, in Mappach, near Bruck in der Oberpfalz in the Kingdom of Bavaria (now part of Germany) to Francis Xavier and Ursula (née Wendl) Krautbauer. He received his early education in Regensburg and Amberg, both in Bavaria. He began his studies for the priesthood at the Ducal Georgianum at the Ludwig-Maximilians-Universität München.

=== Priesthood ===
While in Regensburg, Bishop John Timon of the Diocese of Buffalo recruited Krautbauer to immigrate to the United States. He was ordained a priest for the Diocese of Buffalo on July 16, 1850, by Valentin von Riedel, the bishop of Regensburg.

Travelling with future Bishop Rupert Seidenbusch, Krautbauer arrived in the United States in October 1850. After first briefly serving as assistant pastor at St. Joseph's Cathedral in Buffalo, Krautbauer in 1851 was appointed pastor of St. Peter's Parish in Rochester, New York. St. Peter's served the local German Catholic community, who long fought against Krautbauer and Church leadership for control of the parish.

In addition to his pastoral duties at St. Peter's, Krautbauer was named vicar general of the diocese in 1858. He was soon transferred to Milwaukee to become chaplain of the School Sisters of Notre Dame, serving there from 1859 to 1875.

=== Bishop of Green Bay ===
On February 12, 1875, Krautbauer was appointed by Pope Pius IX to succeed the late Joseph Melcher as bishop of the Diocese of Green Bay. He received his episcopal consecration on June 29, 1875, from Archbishop John Henni, with Bishops Michael Heiss and Thomas Grace serving as co-consecrators, at the Cathedral of St. John the Evangelist in Milwaukee.

Krautbauer oversaw a period of growth for the diocese. During his ten years in Green Bay, the number of Catholics in the diocese increased from 60,000 to 70,000, churches from 92 to 126, and priests from 63 to 96. A year before his death, there were also 44 parochial schools with over 5,000 students. He oversaw the planning and construction of St. Francis Xavier Cathedral (modeled after Ludwigskirche in Munich), laying the cornerstone in 1876 and consecrating in 1881.

Francis Krautbauer died in Green Bay on December 17, 1885, at age 61. He was buried under the floor of St. Francis Xavier Cathedral.

== See also ==
- Catholic Church hierarchy
- Catholic Church in the United States
- Historical list of the Catholic bishops of the United States
- List of Catholic bishops of the United States
- Lists of patriarchs, archbishops, and bishops

Catholic Church titles
Preceded by Joseph Melcher	Bishop of Green Bay; 1875–1885	Succeeded by Frederick Katzer
