= Diocese of Green Bay =

Latin Catholic jurisdiction in the US

Coordinates: 44.5133°N 88.0158°W

Diocese of Green Bay Dioecesis Sinus Viridis
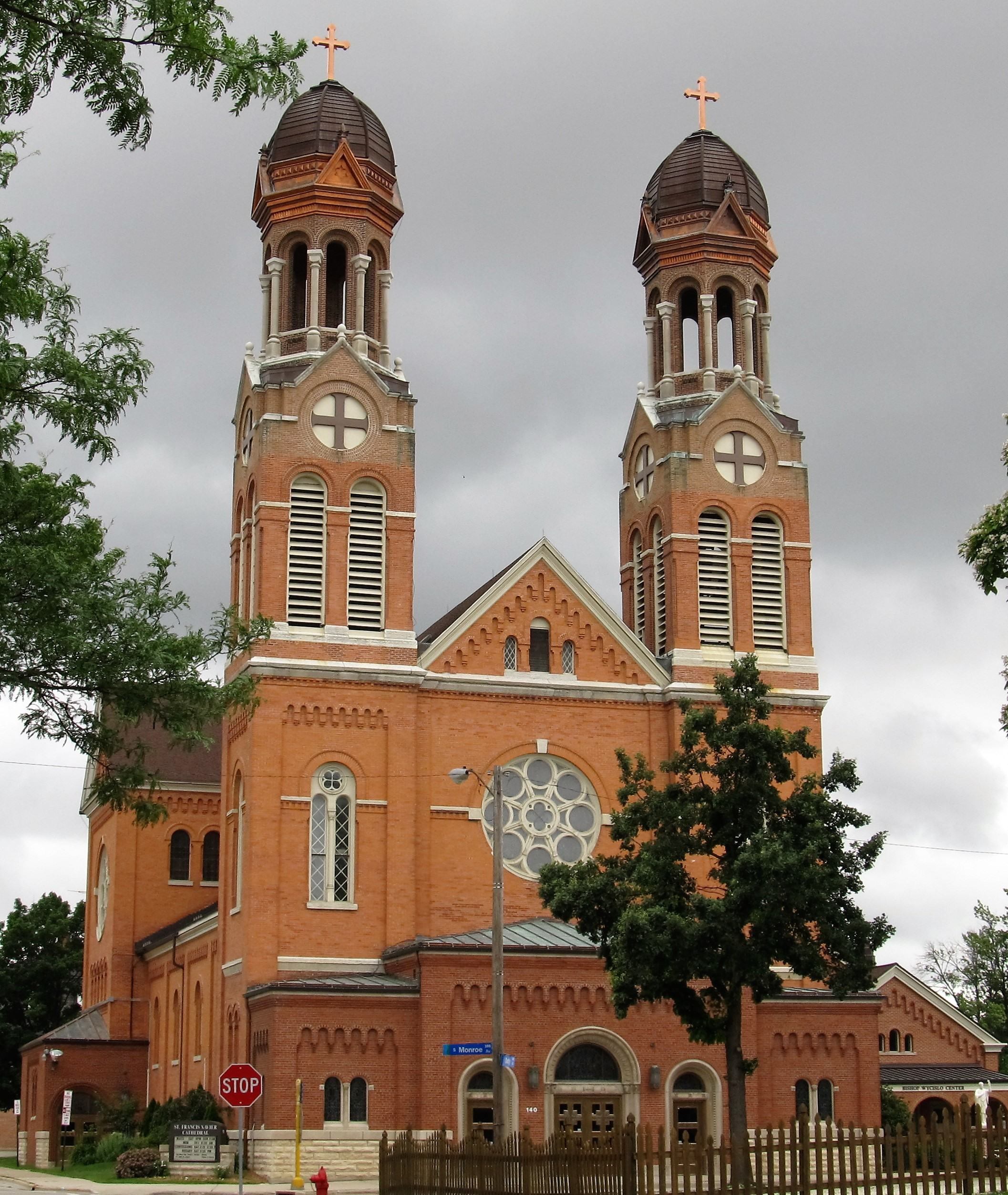
- St. Francis Xavier Cathedral

- Coat of arms

Location
- Country: United States
- Territory: Brown, Calumet, Door, Florence, Forest, Kewaunee, Langlade, Manitowoc, Marinette, Menominee, Oconto, Outagamie, Shawano, Waupaca, Waushara and Winnebago counties, Wisconsin
- Ecclesiastical province: Milwaukee

Statistics
- Area: 10,728 sq mi (27,790 km^{2})
- Population: Total; Catholics: (as of 2006); 998,800; 369,556 (37%)
- Parishes: 169

Information
- Denomination: Catholic Church
- Sui iuris church: Latin Church
- Rite: Roman Rite
- Established: March 3, 1868 (158 years ago)
- Cathedral: St. Francis Xavier Cathedral
- Patron saint: St. Francis Xavier

Current leadership
- Pope: Leo XIV
- Bishop: David Laurin Ricken
- Metropolitan Archbishop: Jeffrey S. Grob
- Vicar General: John Girotti
- Judicial Vicar: Brian Belongia
- Bishops emeritus: Robert Fealey Morneau

Map
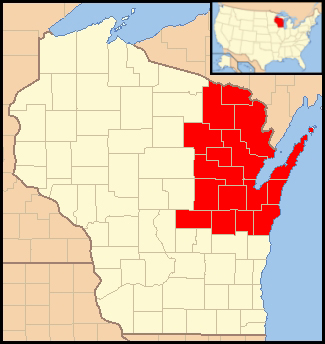

Website
- gbdioc.org

The Diocese of Green Bay (Latin: Diocesis Sinus Viridis) is a diocese of the Catholic Church in the northeast region of Wisconsin in the United States. It is a suffragan diocese of the Archdiocese of Milwaukee. Its mother church is the Cathedral of Saint Francis Xavier in Green Bay. The diocese was erected in 1868. The bishop is David Ricken.

== Territory ==
The Diocese of Green Bay covers the city of Green Bay and the following Wisconsin counties: Brown, Calumet, Door, Florence, Forest, Kewaunee, Langlade, Manitowoc, Marinette, Menominee, Oconto, Outagamie, Shawano, Waupaca, Waushara and Winnebago

== History ==
=== 1600 to 1800 ===
The first Catholic presence in present-day Wisconsin was that of French Catholic missionaries in the Green Bay area in the 17th century. When French explorer Jean Nicolet entered the Green Bay areas in 1634, he was followed by Jesuit missionaries. Wisconsin became part of the French colony of New France.

The first catholic missionary in the Superior region was René Menard, a French Jesuit missionary who was fluent in the Ojibwe, Odawa, and Huron dialects. In Spring 1661, he explored to Chequamegon Bay on Lake Superior. In 1665, Claude Allouez started a Catholic mission near Chequamegon Bay, naming it the Mission of the Holy Ghost. In 1669, Jacques Marquette arrived at the mission after Allouez moved to the Fox River Valley. Marquette baptized over 1,000 converts. In 1669, Allouez and Marquette established St. Joseph in La Pointe, but it was later abandoned.

Allouez celebrated Mass with a Native American tribe near present-day Oconto, Wisconsin in December 1669, the feast of St. Francis Xavier. He established the Saint Francis Xavier Mission there. The mission moved to Red Banks for a short time in 1671, and then to De Pere, where it remained until 1687, when it was burned. The missionaries worked with the Meskwaki, Sauk, and Ho-Chunk tribes, protected by Fort Francis near Green Bay. When Fort Francis was destroyed in 1728, the missionaries left the area.

When the British took control of New France in 1763 after the French and Indian Wars, the bishops in Quebec continued to have jurisdiction in the region. In 1791, soon after the conclusion of the American Revolution, Pope Pius VI erected the Diocese of Baltimore. It covered all the American states and the Northwest Territory, which included part of present-day Wisconsin. The rest of Wisconsin became part of the territory after the Louisiana Purchase in 1803.

=== 1800 to 1868 ===
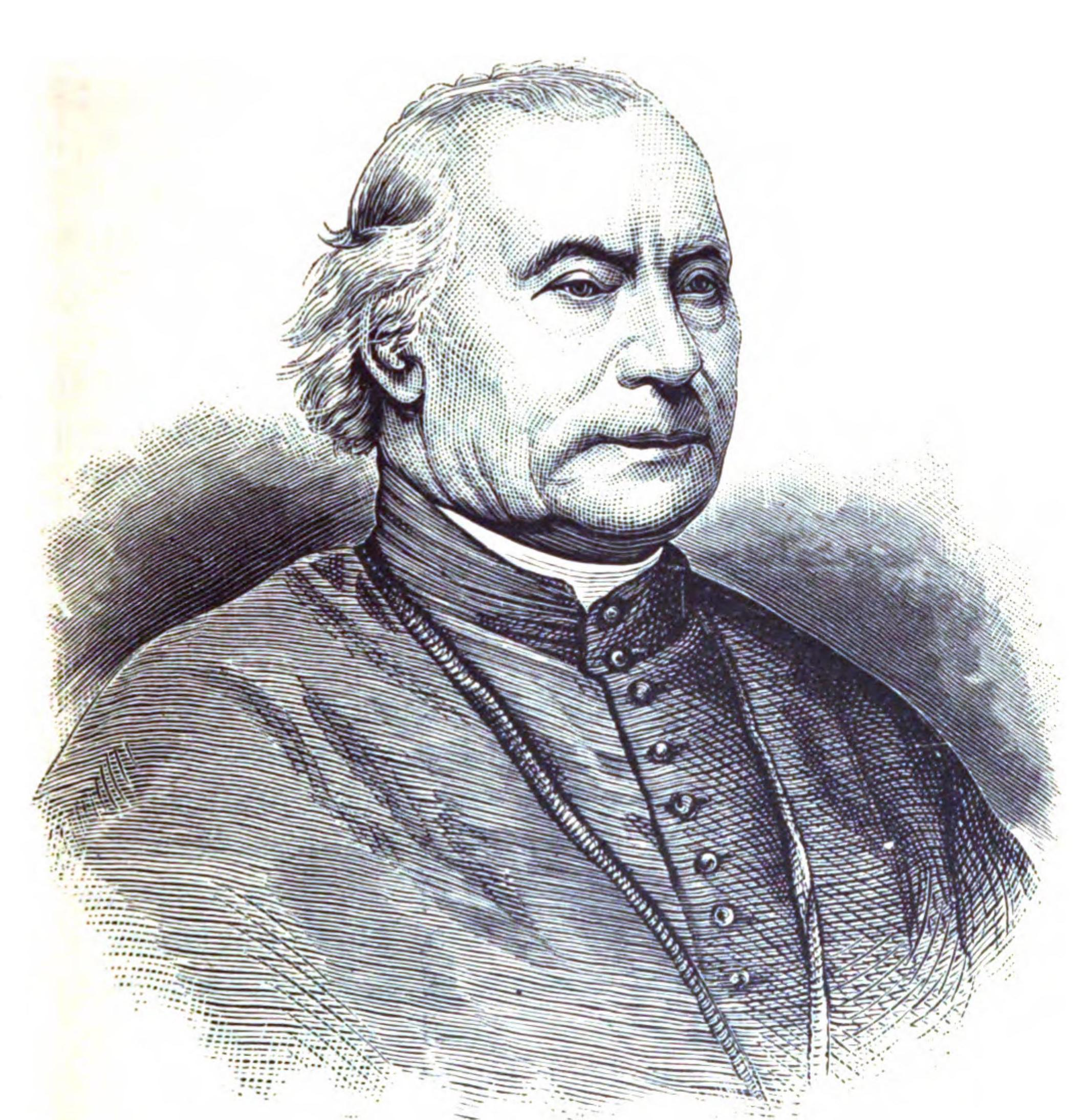
Archbishop Henni (1887)

Catholic jurisdiction for the new Wisconsin Territory passed to the Diocese of Bardstown in 1808, then the Diocese of Cincinnati in 1821. The first new Catholic church in the Green Bay area in over 100 years was constructed in Fort Howard in 1825. Its parishioners included many French Canadians living in the settlement.

The next church to be constructed in the Green Bay area was St. John the Evangelist. Founded by Samuel Mazzuchelli in 1831; it is the longest continuously used church in Wisconsin. In 1833, the new Diocese of Detroit assumed jurisdiction over the area. St. John Nepomucene Parish in Little Chute was founded in 1836.

In November 1843, Pope Gregory XVI erected the Diocese of Milwaukee, taking its territory from the Diocese of Detroit. The new diocese covered all of the Wisconsin Territory, including part of present-day Minnesota. Other early parishes in the Green Bay area included:

- Holy Maternity of Mary, Manitowoc Rapids (1848)
- St Edward the Confessor, Mackville (1849)
- St. Luke, Two Rivers (1851)
- St. Anna, St. Anna (1851)
- St. Peter, Oshkosh (1853)
- St. Mary (now St. Francis Xavier Cathedral), Green Bay, (1854) (German parish)
- St. Willebrod, Green Bay (Dutch parish) (1864)
- St. Patrick, Green Bay (1865)

In 1861, Lambert Brise constructed a church shrine to honor a vision experienced by his daughter, Adele Brise, in Champion, Wisconsin. In 1859, Adele had seen an apparition of Mary, mother of Jesus in the woods. This was the first Marian apparition in the United States. Adele then spent of the rest of her life serving in a religious order.

=== 1868 to 1885 ===
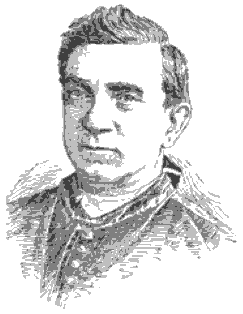
Bishop Melcher (1904)

In 1868, Pope Pius IX erected the Diocese of Green Bay and named Joseph Melcher of the Diocese of St. Louis as its first bishop. When Melcher arrived in the new diocese, there were 16 priests and a Catholic population of 40,000 people. By the end of his term as bishop, the number of priests had increased to 56 and the Catholic population increased to 60,000. In 1869, the Franciscan Sisters of Christian Charity was founded in Silver Lake.

Although the Green Bay area had many French-Canadian Catholic residents, new settlements were populated by other European immigrants pouring into Wisconsin. These immigrants then formed their own ethnic churches. Melcher died in 1873.

In 1875, Francis Krautbauer from the Diocese of Buffalo was appointed by Pope Pius IX to succeed Melcher as bishop of Green Bay. During Krautbauer's ten years in Green Bay, the Catholic population increased from 60,000 to 70,000, the number of churches from 92 to 126, and the number of priests from 63 to 96. By 1880, the diocese had 44 parochial schools with over 5,000 students. That same year, the Franciscan Sisters opened St. Mary's Hospital in Manitowoc.

Krautbauer oversaw the planning and construction of St. Francis Xavier Cathedral, laying its cornerstone in 1876 and consecrating it in 1881. Krautbauer died in 1885.

=== 1885 to 1900 ===
The next bishop of Green Bay was Monsignor Frederick Katzer from Milwaukee, named by Pope Leo XIII in 1886. In Katzer's five years as bishop, the number of Catholic schools increased from 44 with 5,292 students in 1886 to 70 schools with 10,785 students in 1891. During this period, the growth of the English language in the area gradually weakened the bonds of the ethnic churches. The Sisters of the Third Order of St. Francis in 1888 opened St. Vincent's Hospital in Green Bay. It is today HSHS St. Vincent Hospital. In 1890, Leo XIII appointed Katzer as archbishop of Milwaukee.

To replace Katzer in Green Bay, Leo XIII selected Sebastian Messmer as the next bishop in 1891. During his 11-year tenure, Messmer encouraged the growth of parochial schools and other religious institutions. He invited Abbot Bernard Pennings to establish the Norbertine Order in the United States; they founded St. Norbert College in 1898 in De Pere. The Franciscan Sisters in Manitowoc opened Holy Family Hospital in 1899. It is today Froedtert Holy Family Memorial Hospital

=== 1900 to 1967 ===
The Misericorde Sisters came to Green Bay in 1900 to open St. Mary's Hospital for unwed mothers and their infants. It is today HSHS St. Mary's Hospital and Medical Center. Messmer was named archbishop of Milwaukee in 1903 by Pope Pius X.

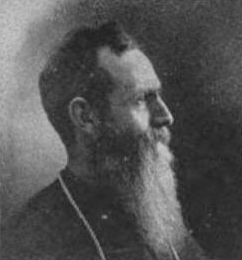
Bishop Fox (pre-1915)

Pius X named Monsignor Joseph Fox of Green Bay as its next bishop in 1904. Fox was the first native-born priest from the diocese to become its bishop. During his tenure, Fox built a new episcopal residence, which later became the diocesan chancery and displayed a strong interest in education and advancing the parochial school system.

Fox resigned as bishop of Green Bay in 1914; Pope Benedict XV appointed Auxiliary Bishop Paul Rhode from the Archdiocese of Chicago as the new bishop in Green Bay. During his tenure, Rhode established ten parishes and 19 parochial schools, and organized the diocesan Catholic Charities and a department of education. The Franciscan Sisters founded Holy Family College in 1935 in Manitowoc. In 1944, Pope Pius XII named Bishop Stanislaus Bona from the Diocese of Grand Island as coadjutor bishop to assist Rhode.

When Rhode died in 1945, Bona automatically succeeded him as bishop of Green Bay. During his tenure in Green Bay, Bona founded 67 grade schools, four high schools, Holy Family College in Manitowoc and Sacred Heart Seminary in Franklin. He also established a diocesan newspaper and adjusted the social welfare program of the diocesan Catholic Charities to meet new needs, including those of migrant workers.

=== 1967 to present ===
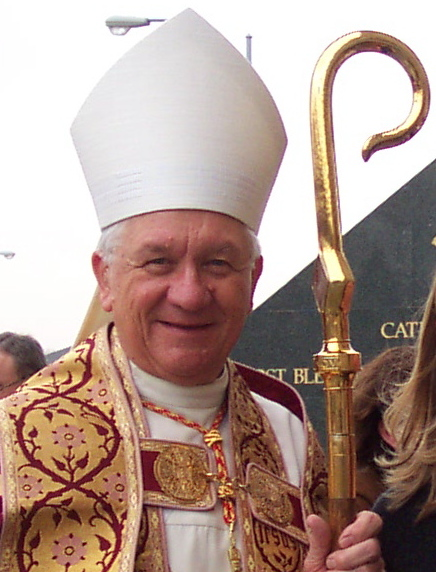
Bishop Maida (2004)

After Bona's death in 1967, Pope Paul VI selected Auxiliary Bishop Aloysius Wycisło of the Archdiocese of Chicago as the new bishop of Green Bay. He served as bishop in Green bay for 16 years, until his retirement in 1983. Pope John Paul II that same year named Adam Maida of the Diocese of Pittsburgh as Wycisło's replacement.

During his tenure in Green Bay, Maida appointed the diocese's first female chancellor and first female parish director. He also established a diocesan planning council and ministry formation program, initiated a diocesan census, implemented the Rite of Christian Initiation of Adults (RCIA) process, and raised $9 million through the Lumen Christi education endowment campaign.

In 1990, John Paul II appointed Maida as archbishop of Detroit. The pope also named Auxiliary Bishop Robert Banks from the Archdiocese of Boston as the new bishop of Green Bay. Banks retired as bishop of Green Bay in 2003. John Paul II then appointed Auxiliary Bishop David Zubik from Pittsburgh to replaced Banks. In 2007, Pope Benedict XVI named Zubik as bishop of Pittsburgh.

David L. Ricken, formerly bishop of the Diocese of Cheyenne, was appointed by Benedict XVI in as bishop of Green Bay in 2008. In 2009, Ricken declared that the Marian apparition seen by Adele Brise in 1859 was "worthy of belief". Community Memorial Hospital in Oconto Falls was purchased by Hospital Sisters Health System (HSHS); It is now HSHS St. Clare Memorial Hospital. In 2020, the Brise shrine in Champion was designated as the National Shrine of Our Lady of Champion.

In March 2022, Ricken instituted a policy that required diocesan employees to refer to transgender individuals by the pronoun of their biological sex. He also restricted transgender people to restrooms corresponding to their biological sex. The diocese severed its ties with the Boy Scouts of America (BSA) in September 2022. The actions was reportedly related to the terms of the BSA bankruptcy case.

=== Reports of sex abuse ===
In September 2002, the priest John Feeney was arrested in Los Angeles on warrants from Outagamie County in Wisconsin, charging him with child sexual assault. He was accused of sexually assaulting brothers Troy and Todd Merryfield when they were young teenagers at St. Nicholas Parish in Freedom in 1978. He was convicted in 2004 and sentenced to 15 years in prison. He was laicized in 2005. The diocese settled with the Merryfields for $700,000 in November 2015.

Donald Buzanowski, a diocesan priest, was convicted in 2005 of sexually assaulting David Schauer in 1988 when he was a student at Saints Peter and Paul School in Green Bay. The Vatican laicized him that same year. Buzanowski had been convicted in 2000 on child pornography charges and served 21 months in prison. In a 2002 letter to the diocese, he admitted to sexually abusing 14 boys. Due to a change in Wisconsin law, Buzanowski was released in 2012 with seven years of probation.

Richard Thomas, a retired priest, was sentenced in October 2016 to four months in jail for exposing himself to a 16-year-old boy. During March of that year, Thomas exposed himself on several occasions through the window of his retirement facility to the boy as he walked to school. In January 2019, the diocese released a list of 46 diocesan clergy who were credibly accused of committing acts of sex abuse. By May 2019, the diocese had added two more names to this list.

== Shrines and oratory ==
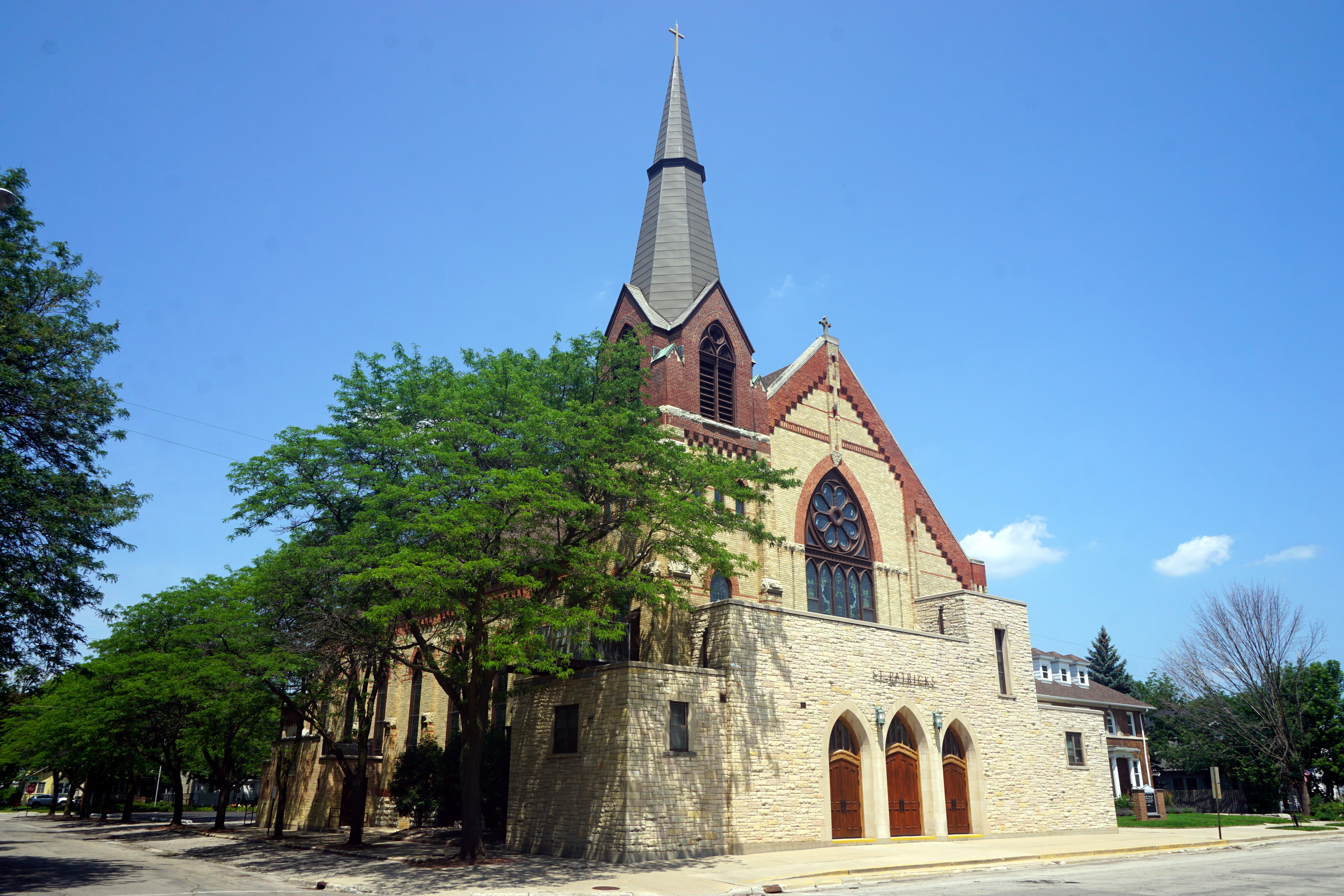
St. Patrick's Oratory, Green Bay, Wisconsin (2024)

The Cathedral of Saint Francis Xavier in Green Bay is the mother church of the Diocese of Green Bay. The diocese is home to two shrines and an oratory:

- National Shrine of Our Lady of Good Help in Champion
- National Shrine of Saint Joseph at Saint Norbert Abbey in De Pere
- Saint Patrick's Oratory in Green Bay

== Bishops ==
=== Bishops of Green Bay ===
1. Joseph Melcher (1868 – 1873)
2. Francis Xavier Krautbauer (1875 – 1885)
3. Frederick F.X. Katzer (1886 – 1891), appointed Archbishop of Milwaukee
4. Sebastian G. Messmer (1891 – 1903), appointed Archbishop of Milwaukee
5. Joseph John Fox (1904 – 1914)
6. Paul Peter Rhode (1915 – 1945)
7. Stanislaus Vincent Bona (1945 – 1967)
8. Aloysius John Wycisło (1968 – 1983)
9. Adam Maida (1983–1990), appointed Archbishop of Detroit (elevated to Cardinal in 1994)
10. Robert Joseph Banks (1990 – 2003)
11. David Zubik (2003 – 2007), appointed Bishop of Pittsburgh
12. David Laurin Ricken (2008 – present)

=== Auxiliary bishops ===
- John Benjamin Grellinger (1949 – 1974)
- Mark Francis Schmitt (1970 – 1978), appointed Bishop of Marquette
- Robert F. Morneau (1978 – 2013)

=== Other diocesan priests who became bishops ===
- Frank Joseph Dewane, appointed Coadjutor Bishop (in 2006) and later Bishop of Venice in Florida
- John Francis Doerfler, appointed Bishop of Marquette in 2013
- Daniel J. Felton, appointed Bishop of Duluth in 2021

== Education ==
The Diocese of Green Bay oversees eight high schools and 56 primary schools.

=== Colleges ===
- St. Norbert College – De Pere
