= Saint Patrick's Oratory (Green Bay, Wisconsin) =

Roman Catholic Church in Wisconsin, United States

Coordinates: 44°31′09.2″N 88°01′23.9″W

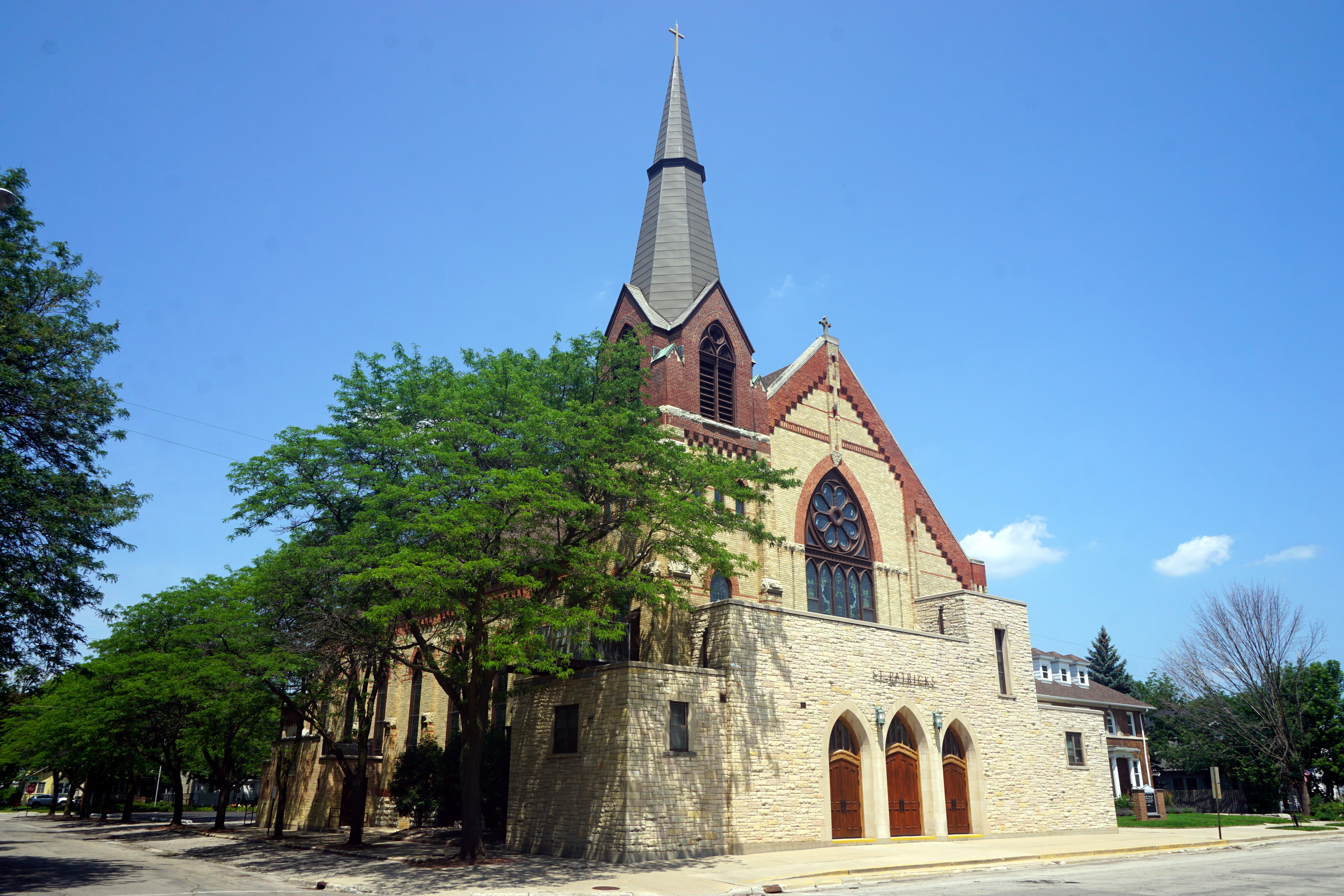
St. Patrick's Roman Catholic Oratory

Saint Patrick's Oratory is a Roman Catholic oratory located in Green Bay, Brown County, Wisconsin, United States, in the Roman Catholic Diocese of Green Bay.

== Description ==
The oratory is under the care of the Institute of Christ the King Sovereign Priest. The current rector is Canon Antoine Boucheron, who replaced Canon Denis Bucholz in the Spring of 2016.
