= Frederick Katzer =

Austrian-born prelate

His Excellency, The Most Reverend Frederick Xavier Katzer
- Archbishop of Milwaukee
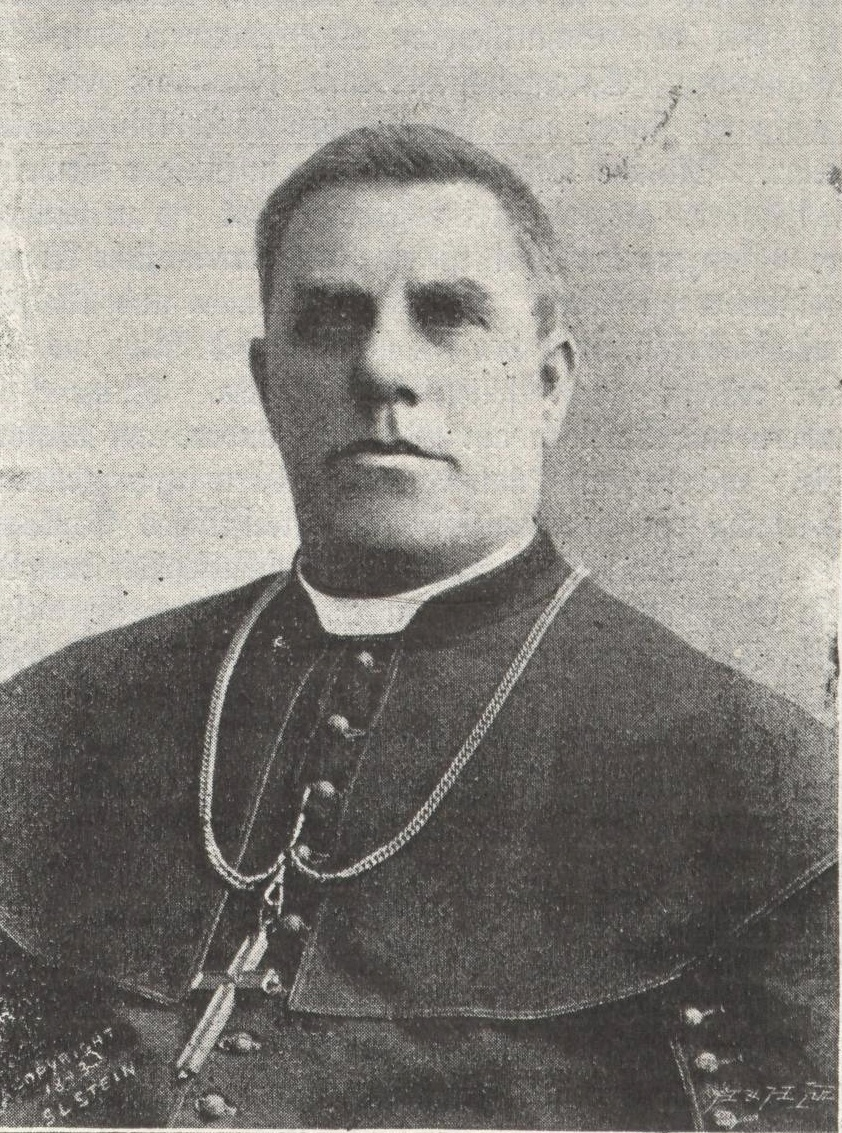
- Church: Catholic Church
- Archdiocese: Milwaukee
- Appointed: January 30, 1891
- Term ended: July 20, 1903 (his death)
- Predecessor: Michael Heiss
- Successor: Sebastian Gebhard Messmer
- Other post: Bishop of Green Bay (1886–1891)

Orders
- Ordination: December 21, 1866 by John Henni
- Consecration: September 21, 1886 by Michael Heiss

Personal details
- Born: February 7, 1844 Ebensee, Austrian Empire
- Died: July 20, 1903 (aged 59) Fond du Lac, Wisconsin, U.S.
- Motto: Soli Deo honor et gloria (Honor and glory to God alone)

Frederick Xavier Katzer (February 7, 1844 – July 20, 1903) was an Austrian-born American Catholic prelate who served as archbishop of Milwaukee in Wisconsin from 1891 to 1903. He previously served as bishop of Green Bay in Wisconsin (1886–1891).

== Early life ==
Frederick Katzer was born on February 7, 1844, in Ebensee, Upper Austria in the Austrian Empire (today part of Austria) to Carl and Barbara Katzer. The family later moved to Gmunden in Upper Austria. Katzer received his early education there while also working in a textile factory. In 1857, he entered the minor seminary run by the Jesuits in Freinberg in Upper Austria to pursue his classical studies.

While studying at the Jesuit seminary, Katzer met Reverend Francis Pierz, a missionary working with the Native American tribes in the State of Minnesota in the United States. Pierz recruited Katzer to finish his seminary studies in Minnesota and serve as a missionary there. With the help of a grant from the Leopoldine Society in Vienna, Katzer was able to pay for passage to the United States.

Katzer landed in New York in May 1864 and then proceeded to Minnesota. However, after arriving there, the Diocese of Saint Paul told Katzer that it was unable to sponsor him in a seminary. At this point, Katzer considered joining the Jesuit order.

However, Katzer then spoke to Reverend Joseph Salzmann, founder of the new Saint Francis de Sales Seminary in Milwaukee, Wisconsin. With the Diocese of Milwaukee needing more priests who spoke German, Salzmann convinced Katzer to complete his theological studies and be ordained there.

== Priesthood ==
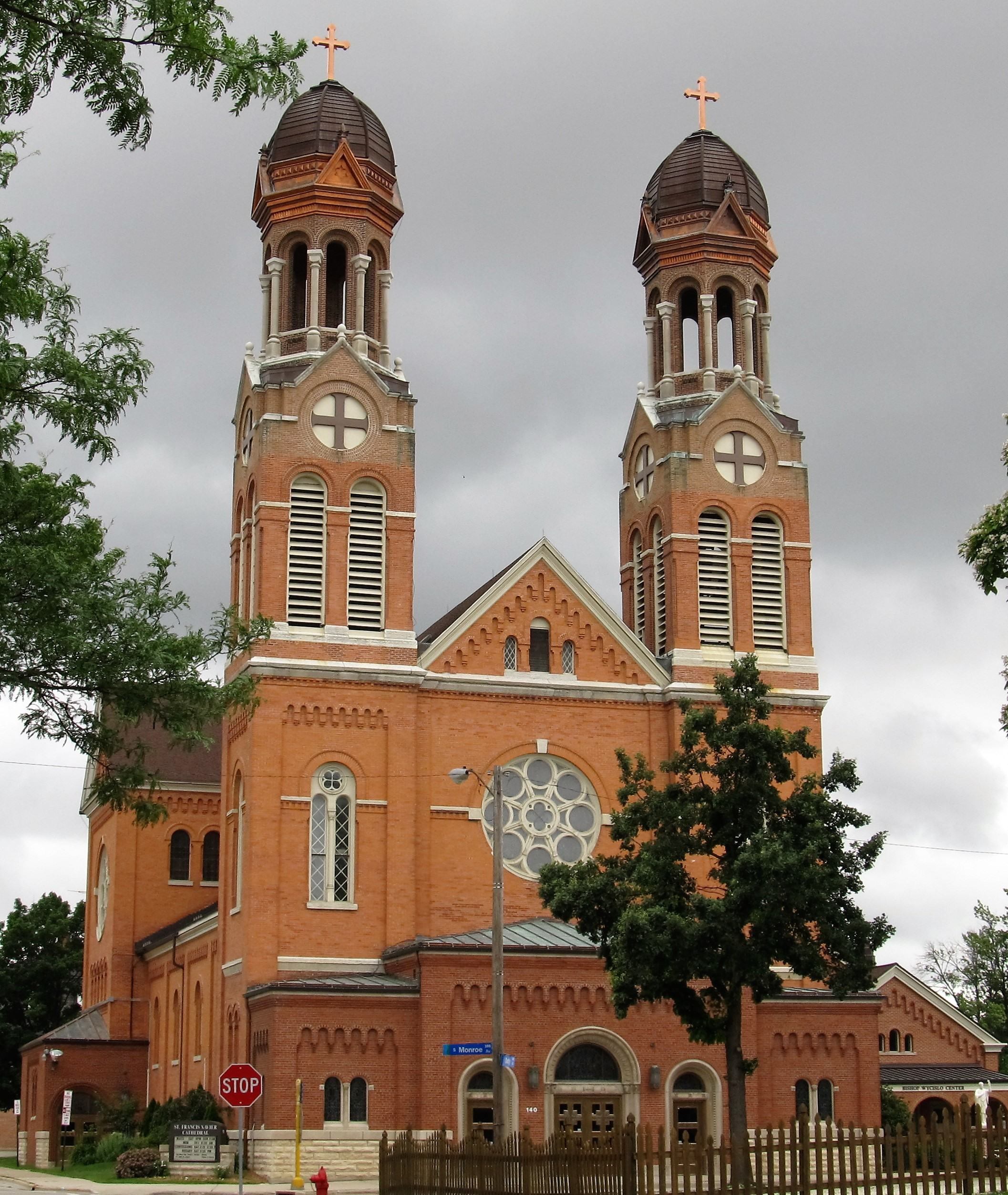
St. Francis Xavier Cathedral, Green Bay, Wisconsin (2013)

After finishing at Saint Francis de Sales, Katzer was ordained a priest for the Archdiocese of Milwaukee on December 21, 1866, by Bishop John Henni.

After his 1866 ordination, Saltzmann appointed Katzer appointed to the faculty of Saint Francis de Sales, where he taught mathematics, philosophy, and theology. In 1867, Katzer brought his parents to the United States. they first lived with him at the seminary, then later followed him to Green Bay and Milwaukee until his father's death in 1876 and his mother's death in 1895.

In July 1875, Katzer was incardinated, or transferred, to the new Diocese of Green Bay. Bishop Francis Krautbauer then named Katzer as his secretary. In 1881, he was appointed as the first rector of the new Saint Francis Xavier Cathedral in Green Bay. That same year, Krautbauer appointed Katzer as vicar general of the diocese.

== Bishop of Green Bay ==
Following Krautbauer's death, Katzer was appointed the third bishop of Green Bay on July 13, 1886, by Pope Leo XIII. He received his episcopal consecration at Saint Francis Xavier Cathedral on September 21, 1886, from Archbishop Michael Heiss, with Bishops John Vertin and John Ireland serving as co-consecrators.

In 1889, Nativist supporters in the Wisconsin Legislature passed the Bennett Law, which required all schools in Wisconsin to teach courses only in English. At this time, the Catholic schools in the state taught in German, Polish and other immigrant languages. Katzer denounced the law as "a step by which Antichrist is trying to promote its attacks on the Church and accomplish its oppression by the state." In the 1890 election, Katzer strongly endorsed the Democratic gubernatorial candidate George Wilbur Peck, who when elected repealed the Bennett Law in 1891.

In Katzer's five years as bishop, the number of Catholic schools in the diocese increased from 44 with 5,292 students in 1886 to 70 with 10,785 students in 1891.

== Archbishop of Milwaukee ==
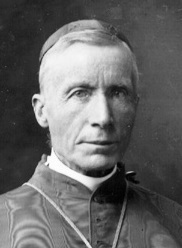
Cardinal James Gibbons (1900)

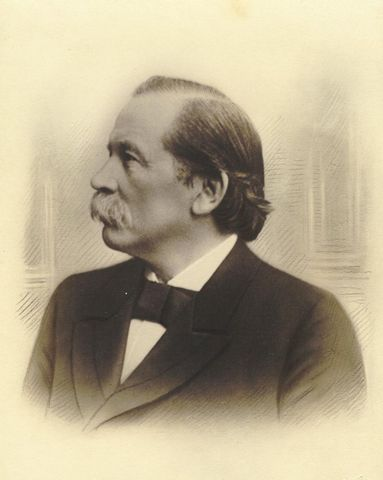
Peter Cahensly (1900)

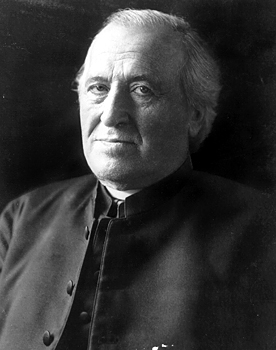
Archbishop John Ireland

After Heiss died in March 1890 the bishops of Wisconsin recommended three German-speaking candidates to replace him to Leo XIII. Their top candidates was Katzer. However, his nomination sparked a backlash among the other archbishops in the United States. During this period, the American Catholic hierarchy was split into two camps.

- The Americanist camp of prelates wanted the Vatican to appoint an English-speaking prelate who would help assimilate Wisconsin immigrants into American society.
- The Conservative camp, in this case the bishops in Wisconsin, wanted a German prelate to preserve the language and traditions of the mainly German population.

Since Katzer was Austrian, the Americanists opposed his appointment. Archbishop John Ireland of St. Paul wrote to Cardinal James Gibbons, saying that Katzer was "a man thoroughly German and thoroughly unfit to be an archbishop."

During a meeting of archbishops in July 1890, the Americanist camp succeeded in creating a list of non-German candidates for archbishop of Milwaukee The Conservatives and Americanists then sent their nominees to the Congregation for the Propagation of the Faith in Rome. On January 30, 1891, in a Conservative victory, Leo XIII appointed Katzer as the third archbishop of Milwaukee.

After his appointment as archbishop, Katzer emerged as a leader of the Conservative camp, which included Archbishop Michael Corrigan of New York and Bishop Bernard McQuaid of Rochester. In 1899, the Conservatives registered another victory with the Testem benevolentiae nostrae, an apostolic letter from Leo XIII. Katzer praised the pope's condemnation of "the errors called by the name of Americanism with all the more joy and gratitude because the decision of the infallible See appeared to us very opportune." The following year, he wrote a letter to the Vatican protesting the appointment of Bishop John J. Keane as archbishop of Dubuque, claiming that Keane belonged to the "liberal Americanists" and that his appointment to a nearby diocese would be hazardous to Milwaukee.

Peter Cahensly, a wealthy German merchant, sent an alarming report to Leo XIII in April 1891. Cahensly claimed that Catholic immigrants in the United States were leaving the faith due to a lack of priests and churches of their own nationalities. However, many observers disputed the accuracy of Cahensly's report, and one newspaper editor accused Katzer of being "Cahensly's protege" and "conspiring with foreign powers."

Katzer denied those allegations and wrote to Cardinal Gibbons, a leader in the Americanist camp. In the letter, Katzer said, "If I hold different opinions...is that a reason to belie me in manner which is almost diabolical?" As a conciliatory gesture, Katzer asked Gibbons to confer the pallium on him in an August 1891 ceremony. In a speech during the ceremony, Gibbons forcefully denounced Cahensly and conservative nationalism.

Katzer was a strong critic of Archbishop's Ireland's Faribault–Stillwater plan. It was an educational experiment started in 1873 with the public school system in Poughkeepsie, New York. In the plan, the Archdiocese of New York placed several parish in the public school system with the provision that the students receive religious instruction outside school hours. Katzer and Corrigan both forwarded their objections to the Vatican. added his name to a letter written by Archbishop Michael Corrigan of New York opposing the plan, and was considered along with Ireland for presenting both sides of the school question to Rome.

Katzer was also a leading opponent of non-Catholic secret societies and fraternal organizations for men. He called for the Vatican to formally condemn the Odd Fellows, the Knights of Pythias, and the Sons of Temperance. The Holy Office issued a condemnation of these societies in 1894, but gave the bishops discretion in publicizing it.

== Later life and death ==
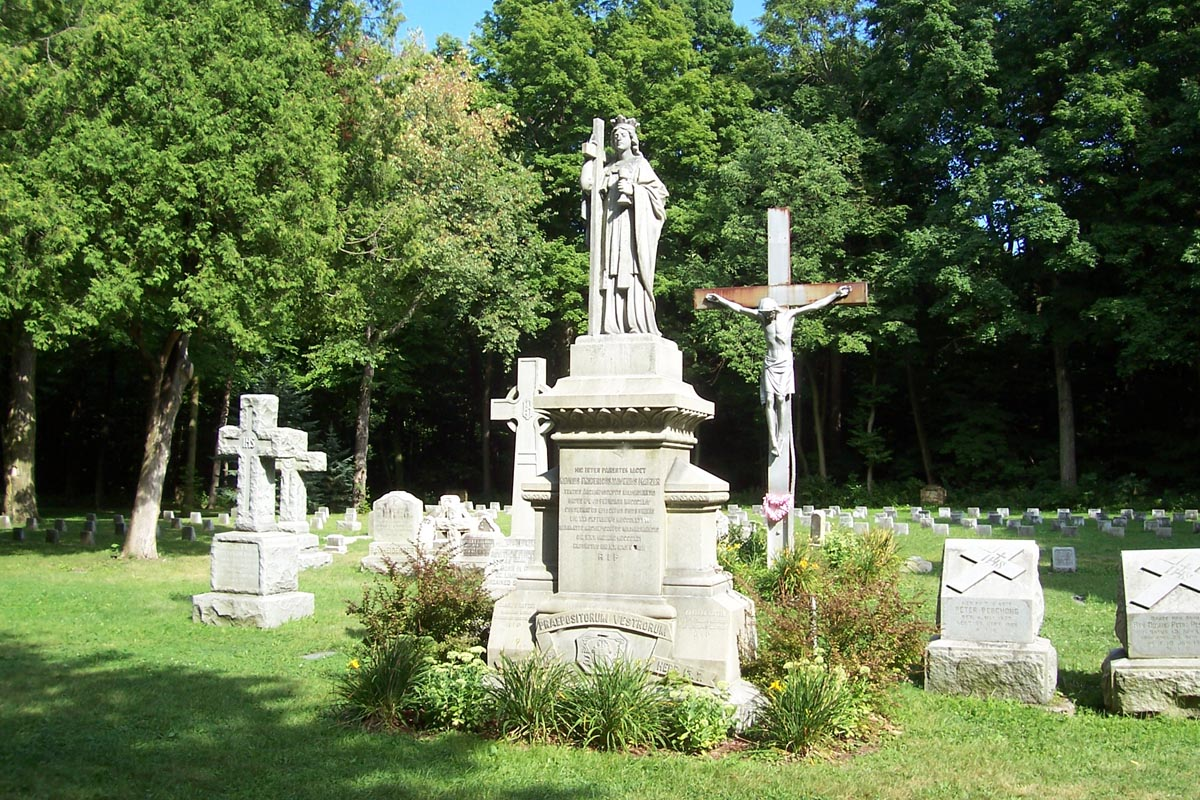
Katzer grave site at Saint Francis De Sales Seminary (2005)

At the beginning of Katzer's tenure in 1891, the archdiocese contained 227 priests, 268 churches, and 125 parochial schools to serve a Catholics population of 180,000. By his final year as archbishop in 1903, the Archdiocese had 329 priests, 321 churches, 148 parochial schools, and 280,861 Catholics.

Frederick Katzer died from liver cancer at Fond du Lac, Wisconsin, on July 20, 1903. He is buried in a small cemetery on the grounds of Saint Francis de Sales.

== Sources ==
- Blied, Benjamin J. (1955). Three Archbishops of Milwaukee: Michael Heiss (1818-1890), Frederick Katzer (1844-1903), Sebastian Messmer (1847-1930). pp. 46–81.

Catholic Church titles
Preceded by Michael Heiss	Archbishop of Milwaukee; 1891–1903	Succeeded by Sebastian Gebhard Messmer
Preceded by Francis Xavier Krautbauer	Bishop of Green Bay; 1886–1891	Succeeded by Sebastian Gebhard Messmer
