= Sebastian Gebhard Messmer =

Catholic archbishop

His Excellency, The Most Reverend Sebastian Gebhard Messmer
- Archbishop of Milwaukee
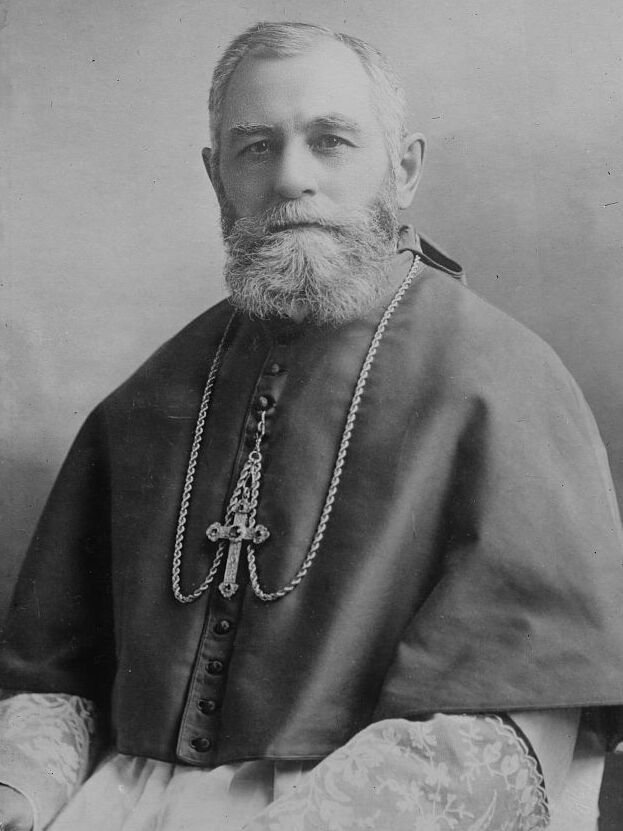
- See: Archdiocese of Milwaukee
- Installed: December 10, 1903
- Term ended: August 4, 1930
- Predecessor: Frederick Katzer
- Successor: Samuel Stritch
- Other post: Bishop of Green Bay (1892–1903)

Orders
- Ordination: July 23, 1871 by Atanasio Zuber
- Consecration: March 27, 1892 by John Joseph Frederick Otto Zardetti

Personal details
- Born: August 29, 1847 Goldach, Switzerland
- Died: August 4, 1930 (aged 82) Goldach
- Denomination: Catholic Church
- Education: University of Innsbruck; Pontifical Roman Athenaeum Saint Apollinare

Sebastian Gebhard Messmer (August 29, 1847 – August 4, 1930) was a Swiss-born American Catholic prelate who served as archbishop of Milwaukee from 1903 to 1930. He previously served as bishop of Green Bay (1892–1903).

Messmer is largely remembered as a political moderate. As a progressive for his time, Messmer opposed segregationist church policies based on race or language, and he was a major supporter of expanding Catholic-run welfare programs. But he also pushed back against socialism as the movement was growing in Wisconsin, and he opposed women gaining the right to vote.

== Biography ==
=== Early life and education ===
Sebastian Messmer was born in Goldach, Switzerland, the eldest of five children of Sebastian and Rosa (née Baumgartner) Messmer. His father, a farmer and innkeeper, also served in the Federal Assembly of Switzerland. His mother died when he was 10 years old. Messmer received his early education in Goldach, then attended the realschule in Rorschach for three years. From 1861 to 1866, he studied at the College of St. George, the diocesan preparatory seminary, in St. Gallen, Switzerland. He then studied philosophy and theology at the University of Innsbruck in Innsbruck, Austria-Hungary.

=== Priesthood and ministry ===
Messmer was ordained to the priesthood by Bishop Atanasio Zuber on July 23, 1871. A week later, he offered his first mass in Goldach.

During this time period, American bishops were actively recruiting German-speaking clerics in Europe who could minister to German parishes in the United States. While visiting the University of Innsbruck, Bishop James Bayley from the Diocese of Newark in New Jersey convinced Messmer to join him.

After Messmer arrived in New Jersey in September 1871, Bayley appointed him as professor of theology at Seton Hall College in South Orange, remaining there until 1889. In addition to his academic duties, he served as one of the secretaries of the Third Plenary Council of Baltimore (1884) and as pastor of St. Peter's Parish in Newark (1885 to 1886).

Messmer then went to Rome to study at the Pontifical Roman Athenaeum Saint Apollinare, where he received a Doctor of Canon Law degree in 1890. After finishing his degree, Messmer served as a professor of canon law at the Catholic University of America in Washington, D.C., for one year.

=== Bishop of Green Bay ===
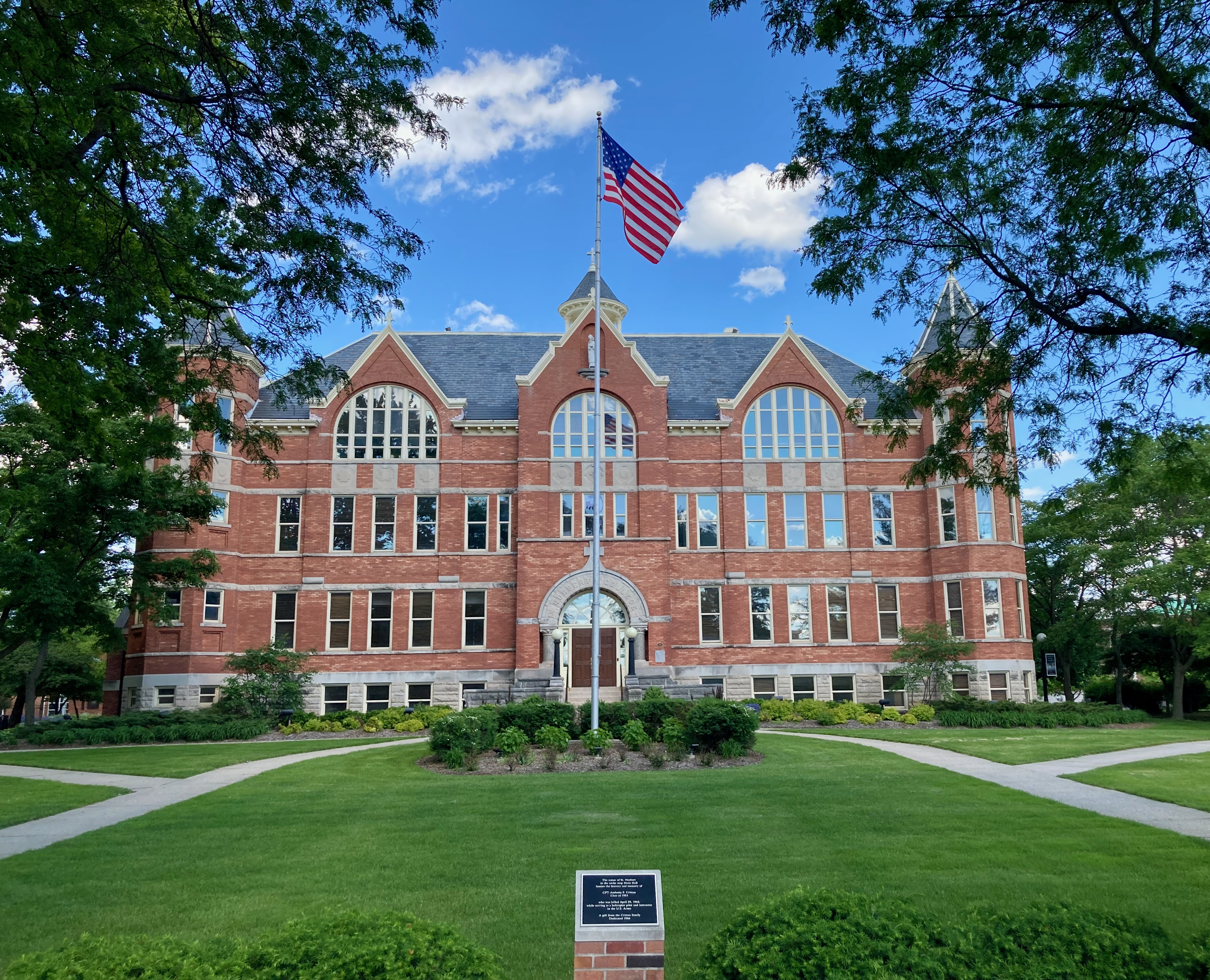
Saint Norbert College, De Pere, Wisconsin (2022)

On December 14, 1891, Messmer was appointed the fourth bishop of Green Bay by Pope Leo XIII. He received his episcopal consecration on March 27, 1892, from Bishop Otto Zardetti (his former schoolmate in Rorschach), with Bishops Winand Wigger and John Keane serving as co-consecrators, at St. Peter's Church in Newark.

During his 11-year tenure, Messmer encouraged the growth of parochial schools and other religious institutions. He also invited Abbot Bernard Pennings to establish the Norbertine Order in the United States, which led to the founding of St. Norbert College in De Pere, Wisconsin.

=== Archbishop of Milwaukee ===
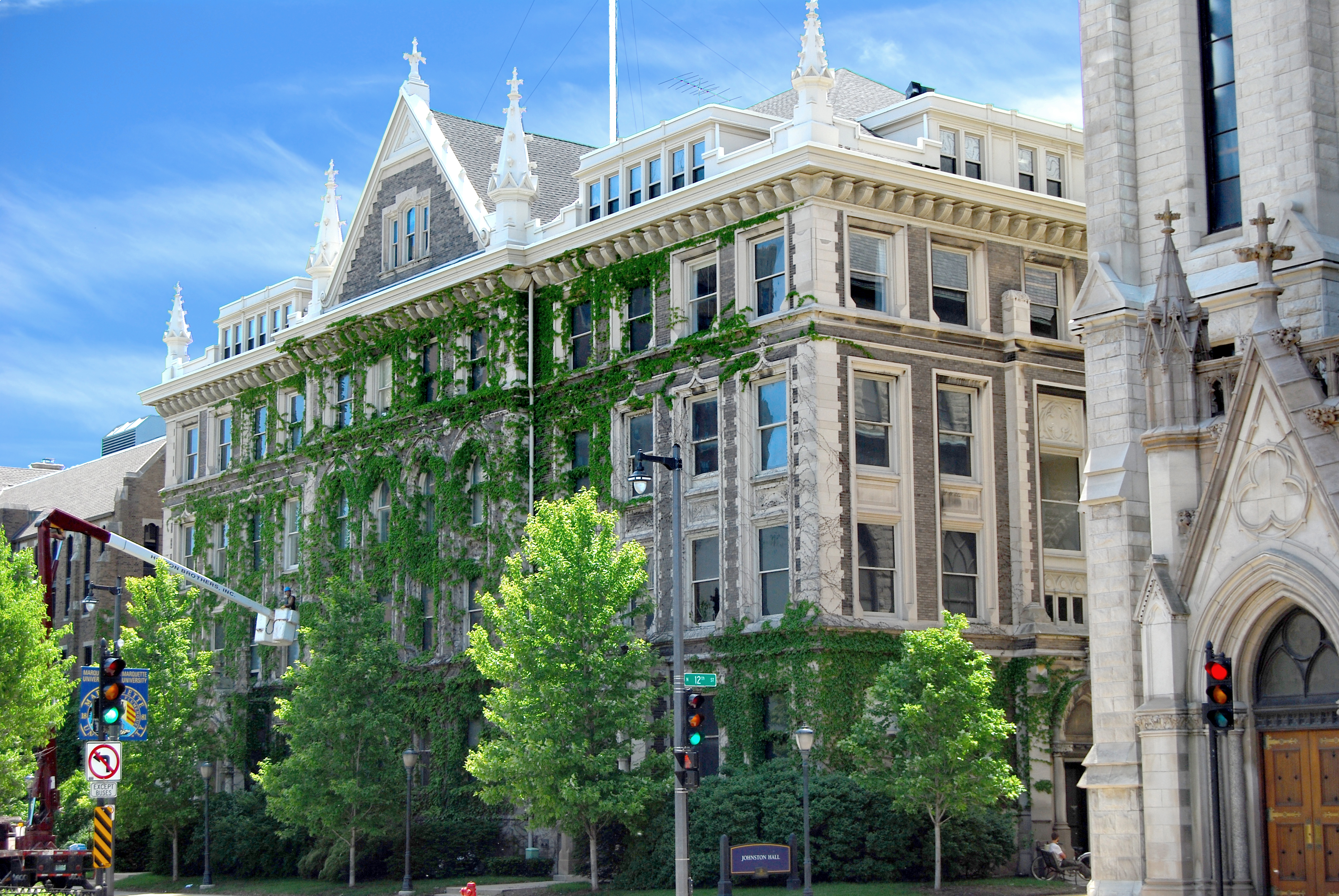
Marquette University, Marquette, Wisconsin (2008)

On November 28, 1903, Messmer was appointed the fourth archbishop of Milwaukee by Pope Pius X. He was installed on December 10, 1903. He succeeded Archbishop Frederick Katzer.

At this time, there was a great debate in American dioceses between Conservatives and Americanizers. The Conservatives wanted to maintain church services and parish school instruction in German and other ethnic language. The Americanizers wanted everything to be in English. However, by the beginning of the 19th century, the German immigrant population was becoming more assimilated and English was starting to become their predominant language.

As archbishop, Messmer sought to ease parishioners through the transition to English. He encouraged, but did not mandate, English-language education in the schools and bilingual church services. Messmer did mandate at least one English-language sermon each Sunday in every parish. "Messmer deliberately de-emphasized ethnic self-consciousness as part of a design to unify and mobilize Catholics for social action," states one article in the U.S. Catholic Historian. By 1920, all the parishes in the archdiocese had ceased instruction in German.

Soon after his consecration, Messmer came into conflict with Kuryer Polski, an independent Polish-language newspaper in Milwaukee. Its editor, Michał Kruszka, consistently complained about the lack of Poles in the archdiocesan Catholic hierarchy, then dominated by Germans. In response, Messmer help fund a new Polish newspaper, Nowiny Polskie, in 1906 that was more supportive of his administration. Kruska said that the new paper was a propaganda tool for the Germans and attacked it mercilessly. In 1912, Messmer banned Catholics from reading Kuryer Polski.

Messmer in 1907 supported the transition of Marquette College in Marquette, Wisconsin, to Marquette University. In 1913, he assisted the School Sisters of Notre Dame in their founding for women of Mount Mary College in Milwaukee. Messmer was an opponent of Prohibition movement, which looked to ban the manufacture and sales of most alcoholic beverages in the United States. Messmer issued a pastoral letter in 1918, declaring,

"[People] fail to see the absolutely false principle underlying the movement and the sinister work of the enemies of the Catholic Church trying to profit by this opportunity of attacking her in the most sacred mystery entrusted to her."

In 1921, Messmer prohibited Catholic children in Milwaukee from participating in a Fourth of July pilgrim pageant. He criticized the pageant as "exclusively a glorification of the Protestant Pilgrims," but later withdrew his objections. Messmer also opposed women's suffrage. He denounced the labor movement as being tinged with socialism. Messmer supported ministry to African Americans and Mexican-American Catholics at a time when many American dioceses were discriminating against them.

He actively supported the American Federation of Catholic Societies. Nearly 30 religious orders were founded and charitable institutions were doubled during his administration. Messmer in 1920 founded the archdiocesan chapter of Catholic Charities. He started the Catholic Herald, the archdiocesan newspaper, in 1922.

=== Death and legacy ===
Messmer died on August 4, 1930, while vacationing in Goldach at age 82. He was then the oldest Catholic bishop in the United States. He is buried in Goldach.

Messmer High School in Milwaukee, now part of Messmer Catholic Schools, was named in his honor in 1928.

== See also ==
- Catholic Church hierarchy
- Catholic Church in the United States
- Historical list of the Catholic bishops of the United States
- List of Catholic bishops of the United States
- Lists of patriarchs, archbishops, and bishops

Catholic Church titles
Preceded by Frederick Katzer	Archbishop of Milwaukee; 1903–1930	Succeeded by Samuel Stritch
Preceded by Frederick Katzer	Bishop of Green Bay; 1891–1903	Succeeded by Joseph John Fox
