= Paul Peter Rhode =

German-born prelate

His Excellency, The Most Reverend Paul Peter Rhode
- Bishop of Green Bay; Titular Bishop of Barca
- Rhode, circa 1927
- Native name: Paweł Pioter Rhode
- Diocese: Diocese of Green Bay
- In office: 1915–1945
- Predecessor: Joseph John Fox
- Successor: Stanislaus Vincent Bona
- Other post: Auxiliary Bishop of Chicago (1908–1915)

Orders
- Ordination: June 17, 1894 by Frederick Katzer
- Consecration: July 29, 1908 by James Edward Quigley

Personal details
- Born: September 18, 1871 Wejherowo, Kingdom of Prussia, German Empire
- Died: March 3, 1945 (aged 73) Mercy Hospital, Oshkosh, Wisconsin, USA
- Education: St. Mary's College; St. Ignatius College; Saint Francis Seminary
- Motto: Via tuas Domine (Your way, Lord)

Styles of Paul Peter Rhode
- Reference style: His Excellency; The Most Reverend
- Spoken style: Your Excellency
- Religious style: Bishop

Paul Peter Rhode (Kashubian: Paweł Pioter Rhode; September 18, 1871 – March 3, 1945) was a German-born prelate of the Roman Catholic Church. He served as bishop of the Diocese of Green Bay in Wisconsin from 1915 until his death in 1945.

Rhode was the first Pole and Kashubian to be elevated to an American bishopric.

== Biography ==
=== Early life and education ===
Paul Rhode was born in Neustadt in the Kingdom of Prussia, German Empire (now part of Poland) to Augustin and Krystyna Rhode. Augustin died in Prussia while Paul Rhode was a young boy. When he was age nine, his family immigrated to the United States in the Kashubian diaspora, settling in Chicago, Illinois.

Rhode was first educated at St. Mary's College in Hardin's Creek, Kentucky. He then attended St. Ignatius College in Chicago, where he completed his classical and philosophical studies. Rhode completed his theological studies at St. Francis Seminary in St. Francis, Wisconsin.

=== Ordination and ministry ===
Rhode was ordained to the priesthood for the Archdiocese of Chicago by Bishop Frederick Katzer on June 17, 1894. His first assignment was as a curate at St. Adalbert Parish in Chicago, where he remained for two years. In 1896, Rhode was appointed as the first pastor of SS. Peter and Paul, a parish for Polish Catholics in the McKinley Park section of Chicago. He was named pastor of St. Michael Parish in South Chicago in 1897.

=== Auxiliary Bishop of Chicago ===
By the early 1900s, waves of immigrants from Partitioned Poland had created notable demand for a Polish bishop, and the issue was acknowledged by church officials in the United States. After the matter was eventually raised to Pope Pius X, Archbishop Quigley finally managed to convinced Rome of the need, and an election was held.

On May 22, 1908, Rhode was appointed auxiliary bishop of Chicago and titular bishop of Barca by Pope Pius X. Since he was the first Pole in America to be named a bishop, this occasion was celebrated by the Polish American community. He received his episcopal consecration at Holy Name Cathedral in Chicago on July 29, 1908, from Archbishop James Edward Quigley, with Bishops Peter Muldoon and Joseph Koudelka serving as co-consecrators. He served as vicar general of the archdiocese from 1909 to 1915.

=== Bishop of Green Bay ===
Following the resignation of Bishop Joseph J. Fox, Rhode was appointed the sixth bishop of Green Bay by Pope Benedict XV on July 15, 1915. During his tenure, he established 10 parishes and 19 parochial schools, and organized the diocesan Catholic Charities and a department of education.

Paul Rhode died at Mercy Hospital in Oshkosh, Wisconsin, on March 3, 1945, at age 73.

== See also ==
- Catholic Church hierarchy
- Catholic Church in the United States
- Historical list of the Catholic bishops of the United States
- List of Catholic bishops of the United States
- Lists of patriarchs, archbishops, and bishops

== Notes ==
Catholic Church titles
| Preceded by Joseph John Fox | Bishop of Green Bay; 1915–1945 | Succeeded by Stanislaus Vincent Bona |
| Preceded by – | Auxiliary Bishop of Chicago; 1908–1915 | Succeeded by – |
