= John Benjamin Grellinger =

John Benjamin Grellinger (November 5, 1899 – April 13, 1984) served as a Roman Catholic auxiliary bishop of the Roman Catholic Diocese of Green Bay. He was also titular bishop of Syene.

== Biography ==
Born in Milwaukee, Wisconsin, Grellinger entered Saint Francis Seminary in Milwaukee in 1922. He was ordained to the priesthood in Rome on July 14, 1929. On May 16, 1949, Pope Pius XII appointed Grellinger auxiliary bishop of the Green Bay Diocese and he was consecrated on July 14, 1949. Bishop Grellinger retired on September 21, 1974.

== Notes ==
Catholic Church titles
Preceded by –	Auxiliary Bishop of Green Bay; 1949–1974	Succeeded by –
