= Church of Saints Peter and Paul (Rochester, New York) =

Historic church in New York, United States

- Church of Saints Peter and Paul Complex
- U.S. National Register of Historic Places
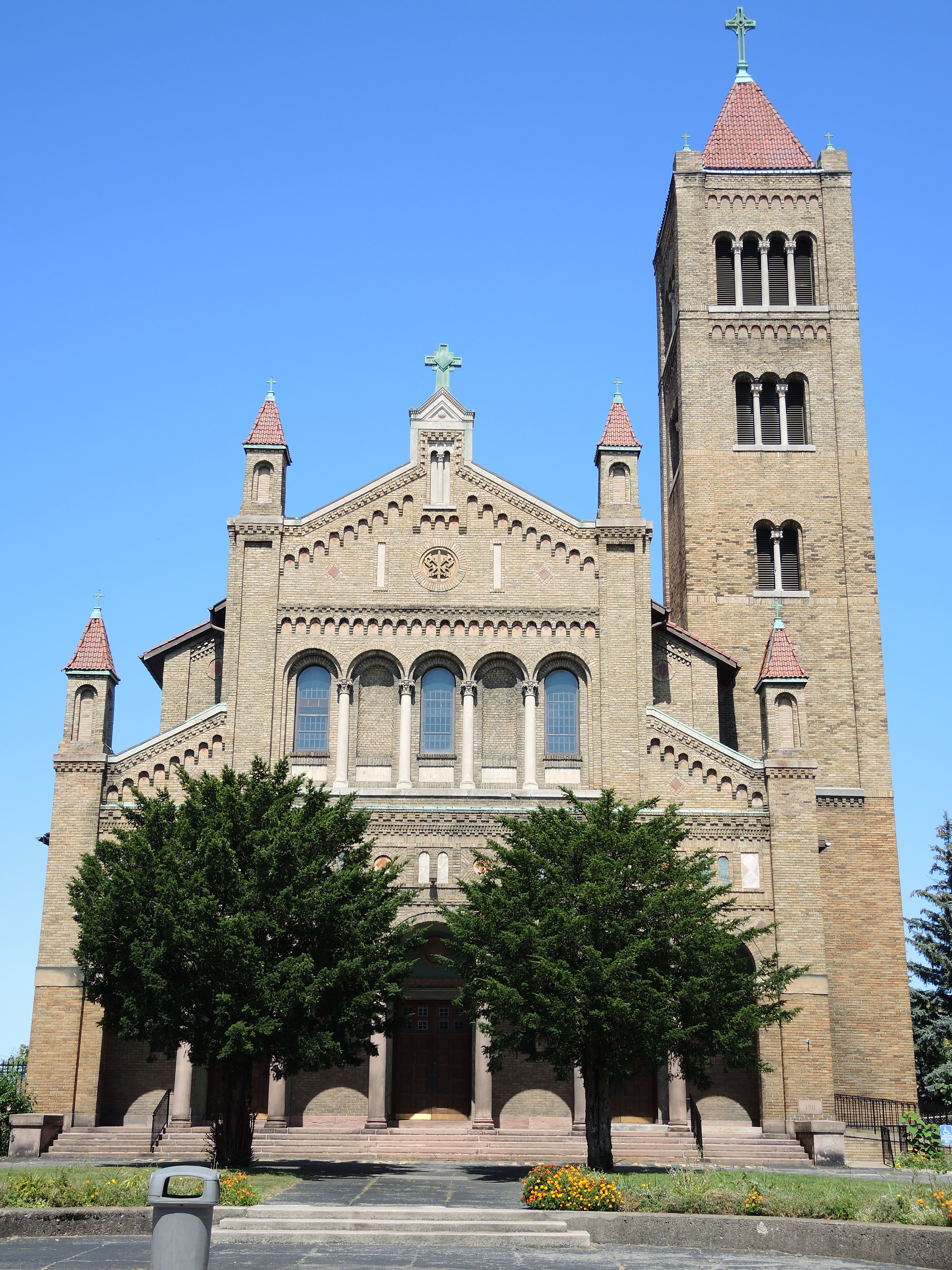
- Church of Saints Peter and Paul, August 2013

- Location within New York Location within the United States
- Location: 720 & 736 W. Main, & 681 Brown Sts., Rochester, New York
- Coordinates: 43°9′6″N 77°37′57″W
- Area: 2.937 acres (1.189 ha)
- Built: 1911, 1912, 1926
- Architect: Gordon, Edwin S., and William V. Madden; Joseph H Oberlies and George F. Lorenz
- Architectural style: Italian Renaissance, 20th Century Revival
- NRHP reference No.: 12000342
- Added to NRHP: June 20, 2012

Church of Saints Peter and Paul Complex, now known as the Coptic Monastery of Saint Shenouda, is a historic Roman Catholic church complex located on the edge of the Susan B. Anthony neighborhood of Rochester, Monroe County, New York. The complex consists of the Italian Renaissance Revival style church (1911), former school (1912), rectory (1926), and rectory garage (1926). The church features a loggia and 145 feet tall bell tower. The school has been converted to 12 apartments. The church was sold to the Coptic Monastery of Saint Shenouda in 2007.

The complex was listed on the National Register of Historic Places in 2012.
