= Saint Luke's Church Complex =

Historic church in Wisconsin, United States

- U.S. National Register of Historic Places
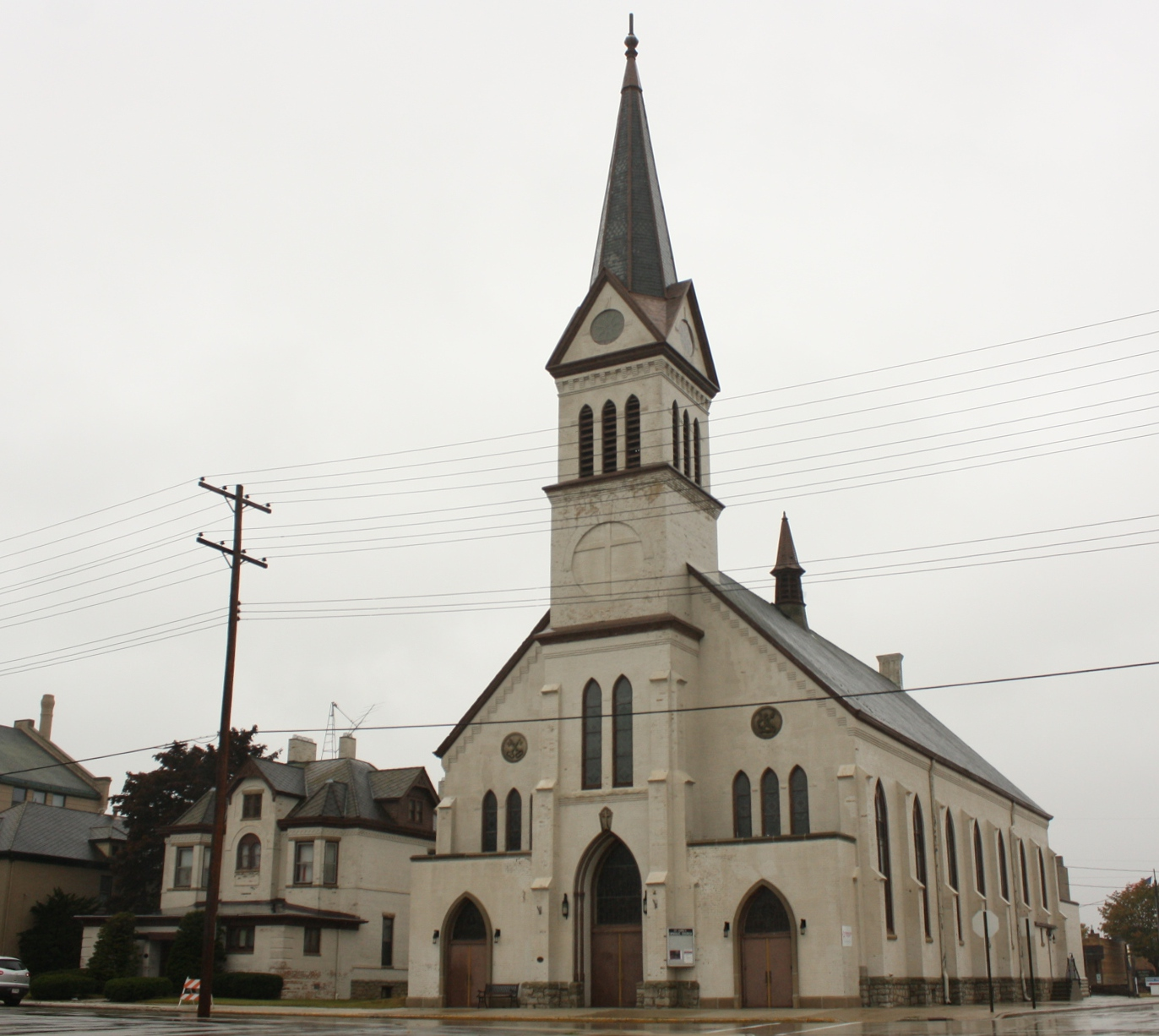
- Location: 1800-1816 Jefferson St. Two Rivers, Wisconsin
- Architectural style: Gothic Revival/Queen Anne
- NRHP reference No.: 01000107
- Added to NRHP: February 9, 2001

Saint Luke's Church Complex is a former Roman Catholic church and school located in Two Rivers, Wisconsin. The site, occupying one-half block, was added to the National Register of Historic Places in 2001. The complex covers 10 acres and contains 4 buildings of various architectural styles.

The church, a Gothic Revival building built in 1891, is still used for religious services. The rectory is a Queen Anne style building built in 1895 with modifications in 1926 and 1946. It too is still used for its original purpose as the residence of the parish priest. The convent, also a Queen Anne style residence, was built in 1903 with modifications in 1916 and 1931, is now leased to the Two Rivers Historical Society. The school, a three-story building in a style influenced by the Classical Revival, was built in 1909 with modifications in 1921, 1931, and 1958. As of 1992 it was being converted into an apartment complex.
