= Joseph Melcher =

Catholic bishop

His Excellency, The Most Reverend Joseph Melcher
- Bishop of Green Bay
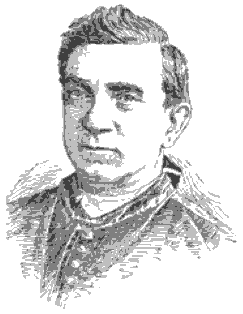
- Diocese: Diocese of Green Bay
- In office: 1868–1873
- Successor: Francis Xavier Krautbauer

Orders
- Ordination: March 27, 1830 by Adeodato Antonio Caleffi
- Consecration: July 12, 1868 by Peter Richard Kenrick

Personal details
- Born: March 18, 1807 Vienna, Austrian Empire
- Died: December 20, 1873 (aged 67) Green Bay, Wisconsin, US
- Denomination: Roman Catholic

Joseph Melcher (March 18, 1807 – December 20, 1873) was an Austrian-born prelate of the Catholic Church who served as the first bishop of the Diocese of Green Bay in Wisconsin from 1868 until his death in 1873.

== Biography ==
=== Early life ===
Joseph Melcher was born March 18, 1807, in Vienna in the Austrian Empire to Mathias and Theresa (née Loibl) Melcher. In 1814, the family moved to Modena, Italy, where Matthew Melcher had been appointed administrator of the property of Francis IV, Duke of Modena. Joseph Melcher studied philosophy and theology in Modena, obtaining the degree of Doctor of Divinity.

=== Priesthood ===
Melcher was ordained a priest in Italy on March 27, 1830, by Bishop Adeodato Antonio Caleffi. After his ordination, Melcher served as a chaplain to German Catholics in Modena. in 1842 or 1843, Melcher was recruited by Bishop Joseph Rosati to return with him to the United States and work in what was then the Diocese of St. Louis. Melcher arrived in Missouri in 1843. As Rosati had died during the voyage, Melcher was greeted by his successor, Bishop Peter Kenrick. Melcher's first assignment was as a missionary in Little Rock, Arkansas.

After Little Rock was elevated to a diocese, Melcher was recalled to Missouri and assigned as a pastor in St. Louis County from 1844 to 1846. He accompanied Bishop Kenrick to the sixth Provincial Council of Baltimore in 1846, and regularly went to Europe to recruit priests for the diocese. In 1847, Melcher was appointed vicar general of the diocese and pastor of St. Mary of Victories Parish, which served German Catholics in St. Louis.

On July 23, 1853, Melcher was named the first bishop of the new Diocese of Quincy in Illinois and administrator of the vacant Diocese of Chicago by Pope Pius IX. Melcher never was installed there.

=== Bishop of Green Bay ===
Melcher was named the first bishop of the Diocese of Green Bay on March 3, 1868. He received his episcopal consecration on July 12, 1868, in St. Louis from Archbishop Kenrick, with Bishops John Henni and Henry Juncker serving as co-consecrators.

When Melcher arrived in the new diocese, there were 16 priests and a Catholic population of 40,000 people. By the end of his five years as bishop, the number of priests had increased to 56 and the Catholic population to 60,000. He also began the preparatory work for the new cathedral. From 1869 to 1870, Melcher attended the First Vatican Council in Rome.

Joseph Melcher died in Green Bay, Wisconsin, on December 20, 1873, at age 67.

== See also ==
- Catholic Church hierarchy
- Catholic Church in the United States
- Historical list of the Catholic bishops of the United States
- List of Catholic bishops of the United States
- Lists of patriarchs, archbishops, and bishops

== Notes ==
Catholic Church titles
Preceded by None	Bishop of Green Bay; 1868–1873	Succeeded by Francis Xavier Krautbauer
