= Saint Francis Xavier Cathedral (Green Bay, Wisconsin) =

Historic church in Green Bay, Wisconsin, United States

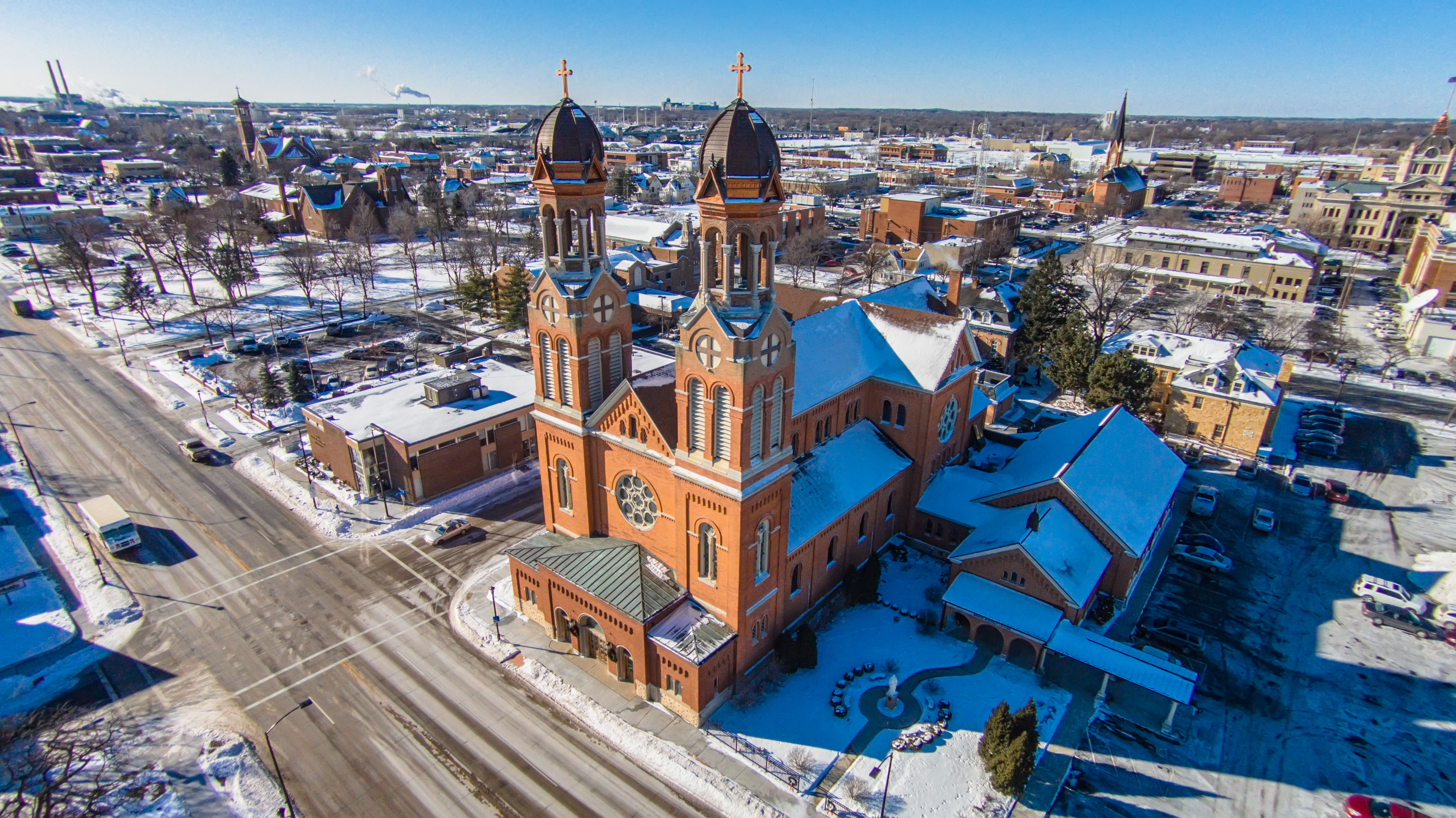
- Aerial view

- Location in Wisconsin
- 44°30′41″N 88°00′42″W
- Location: South Monroe Avenue; Green Bay, Wisconsin
- Country: United States
- Denomination: Roman Catholic
- Website: www.sfxcathedralgb.com

History
- Status: Cathedral
- Founded: 1851
- Dedication: November 20, 1881

Architecture
- Style: Romanesque Revival
- Completed: 1881
- Construction cost: $35,000

Specifications
- Materials: Brick

Administration
- Diocese: Green Bay

Clergy
- Bishop: Most Rev. David Ricken
- Rector: Rev. Ryan Krueger

St. Francis Xavier Cathedral is the cathedral church of the Roman Catholic Diocese of Green Bay in Green Bay, Wisconsin, in the United States. The cathedral was named in honor of Francis Xavier. a Spanish saint.

== History ==
=== Annunciation of the Blessed Virgin Mary Church ===
In 1851, a group of German immigrants in Green Bay founded the Annunciation of the Blessed Virgin Mary Parish and constructed a small wooden-frame church. At that time, the Green Bay area was under the jurisdiction of the Diocese of Milwaukee. This church would be the predecessor of Saint Francis Xavier Cathedral

The Vatican in 1868 erected the Diocese of Green Bay and appointed Joseph Melcher as its first bishop. Melcher then designated Annunciation as the pro-cathedral of the diocese until a permanent cathedral could be constructed.

Bishop Francis Xavier Krautbauer in 1876 began construction of the new cathedral. He funded the project with contributions from the royal family of Bavaria, the Bavarian Mission Society in Munich and from local immigrants. The new cathedral was patterned after the Ludwigskirche, a landmark Catholic church in Munich.

=== Saint Francis Xavier Cathedral ===
Saint Francis Xavier Cathedral was consecrated in 1881.In 1904, the diocese added two belfries to the cathedral. A three-story sacristy was constructed in 1918. The diocese in 1959 undertook the first renovation of the cathedral interior and added three enclosed entrances to the exterior. The Cathedral Center opened in 2004, serving as the new home for the Cathedral Museum.

The cathedral began receiving a series of 18 restorations starting in 2014. The cathedral closed in September 2017 for a $2.4 million restoration. Repairs include the floors, pews, paintings, and pipe organ.The cathedral reopened later that year.

== Images ==
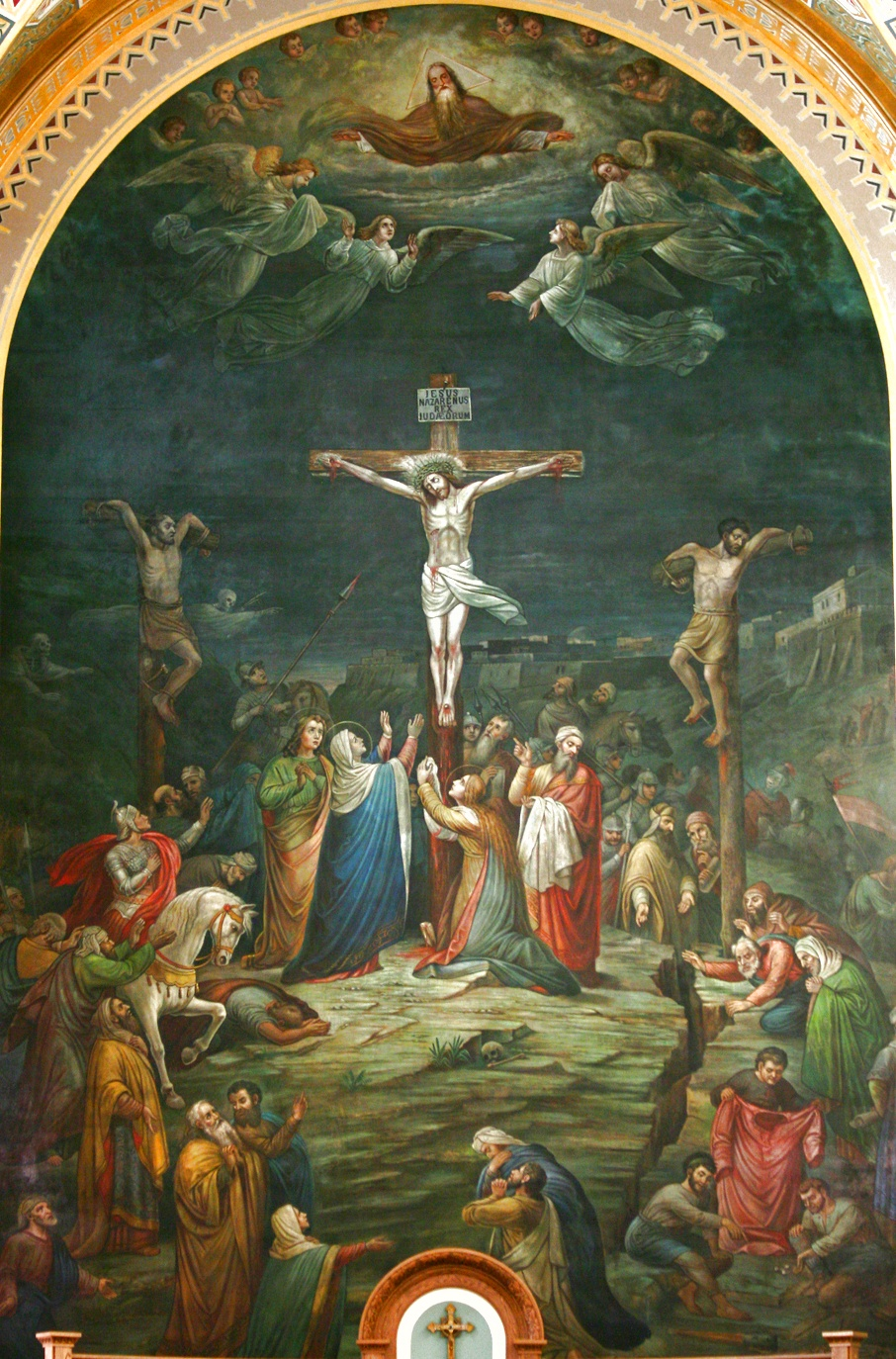
Crucifixion painted by Johann Schmitt

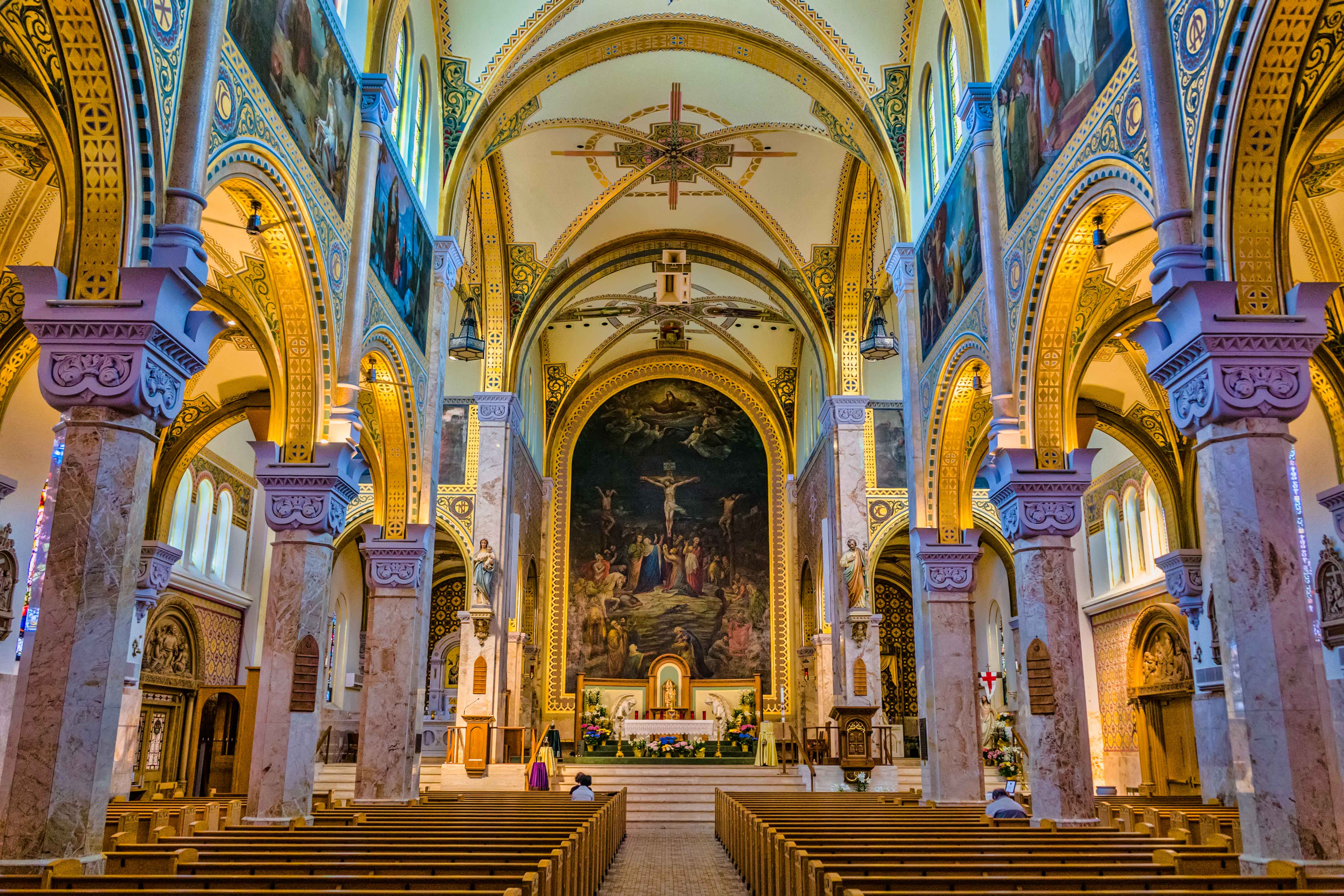
Saint Francis Xavier Cathedral Interior before restorations

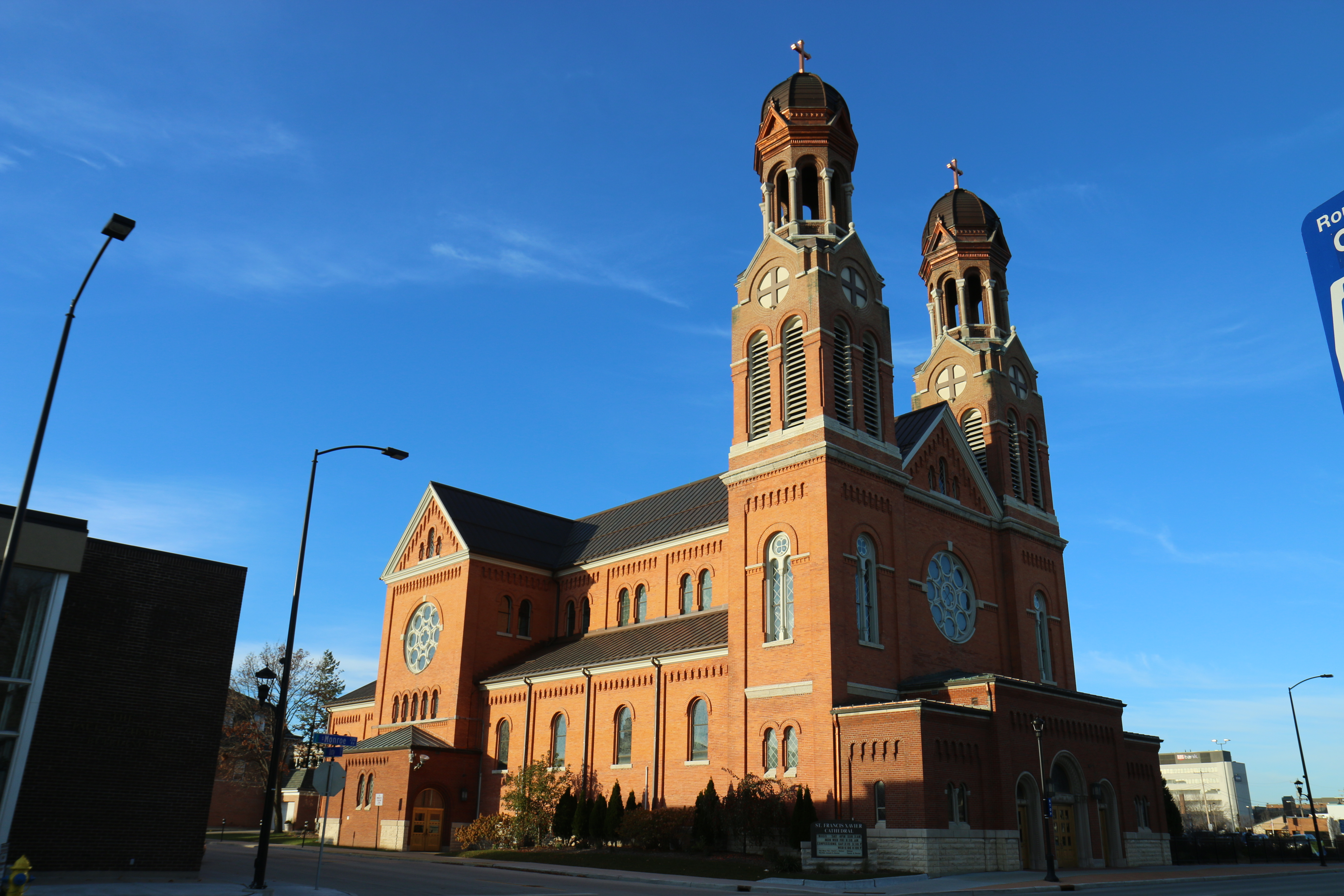
Street View across S. Monroe & Doty

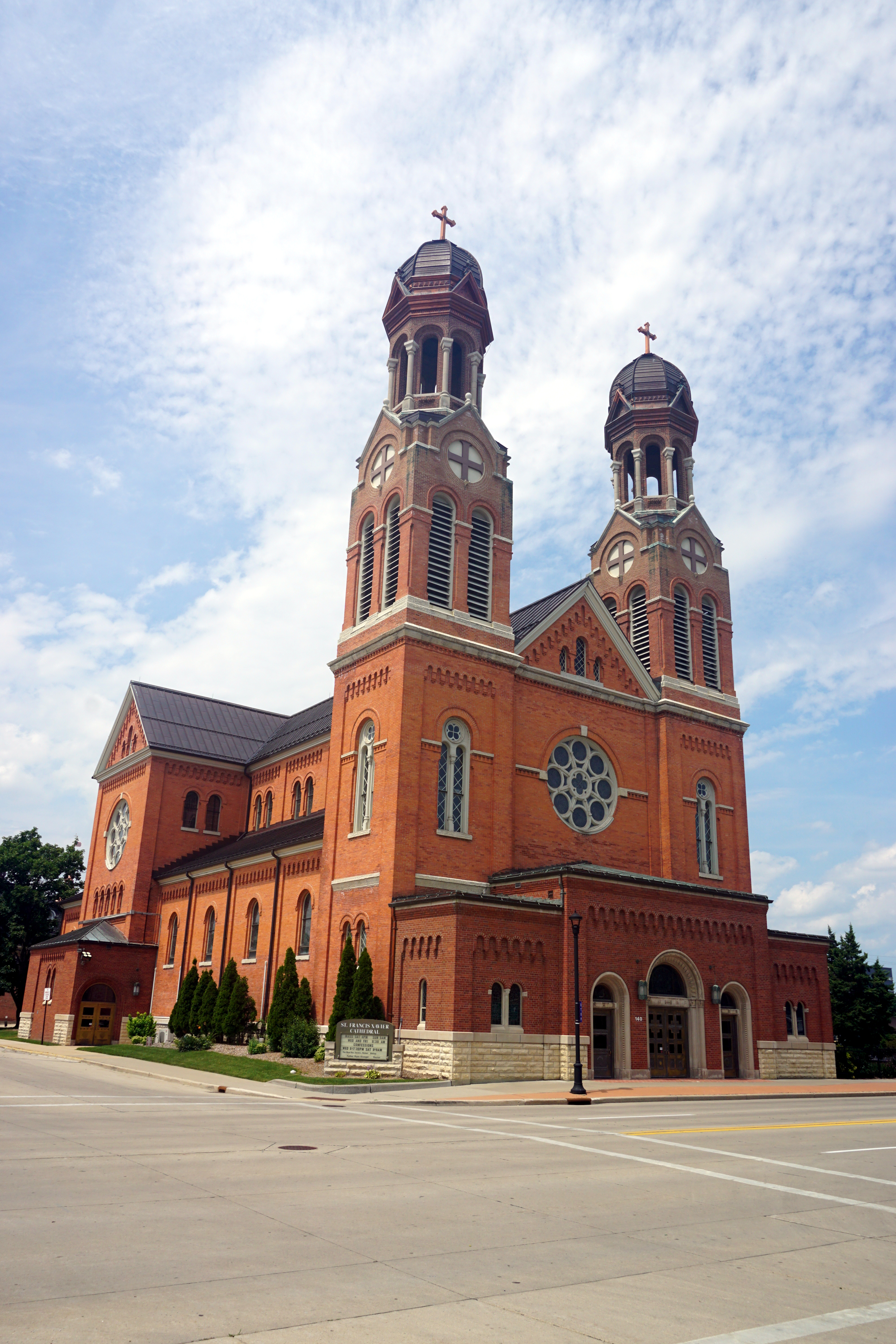
Exterior of St. Francis Xavier Cathedral

== See also ==
- List of Catholic cathedrals in the United States
- List of cathedrals in the United States
