= Ducal Georgianum =

German theological seminary

Coordinates: 48°09′00″N 11°34′55″E

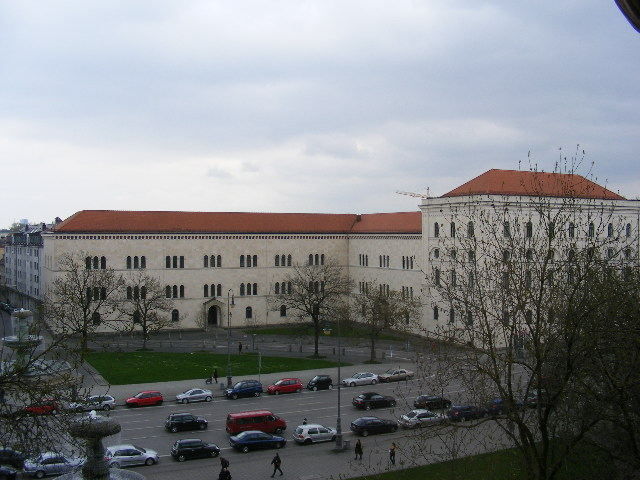
Georgianum

The Ducal Georgianum (German: Herzogliches Georgianum) is a theological seminary of the Bavarian University (LMU Munich) in Germany. It was founded in 1494. Pope Benedict XVI studied at the Seminary until 1951.
