= St. Vincent De Paul Catholic Church (Cape Girardeau, Missouri) =

Historic church in Missouri, United States

- U.S. National Register of Historic Places
- U.S. Historic district – Contributing property
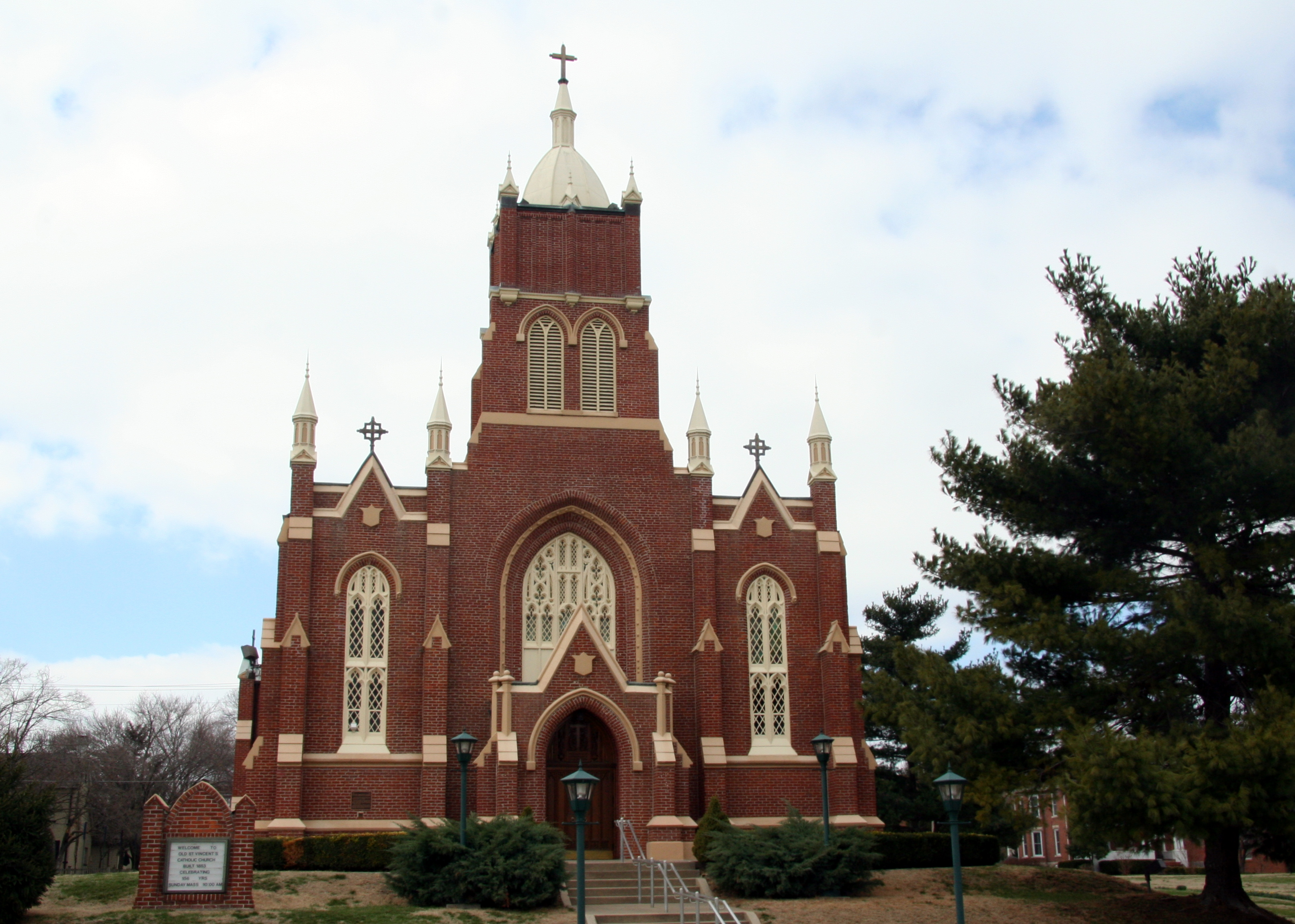

- Location within Missouri Location within the United States
- Location: 131 South Main St., Cape Girardeau, Missouri
- Coordinates: 37.3008°N 89.5195°W
- Area: 1.2 acres (0.49 ha)
- Built: 1853
- Built by: John Lansman
- Architect: Thomas Waryng Walsh
- Architectural style: Greek Revival, English Perpendicular
- NRHP reference No.: 82003131
- Added to NRHP: April 12, 1982

The St. Vincent De Paul Catholic Church in Cape Girardeau, Missouri is a historic church at 131 South Main Street. It is a chapel of ease for the Cathedral of St. Mary of the Annunciation and is listed on the National Register of Historic Places.

== Architecture ==
The church was built in the English Perpendicular Gothic Revival style using red brick with sandstone trim on a foundation of sandstone. It was designed by Irish-born architect Thomas Waryng Walsh.

== History ==
St. Vincent De Paul is situated on the site of Louis Lorimier's Red House. In 1821, priests began making periodic visits to settlers in the area. By 1833, the land where the church stands today had been secured, and by 1836 Cape Girardeau had its first permanent priest, Reverend John Odin. The cornerstone for the church was laid in April 1838 by Bishop Rosati of St. Louis. The church was named for the Vincentian fathers who founded it as well as St. Vincent's College. This church was destroyed by a tornado in 1850. The present church was constructed on the original foundations of the first church, with construction beginning in 1851 and finishing in 1853. The church tower has been struck twice by lightning and destroyed in 1912. The church was added to the National Register in 1982. It is located in the Courthouse-Seminary Neighborhood Historic District.

== Gallery ==
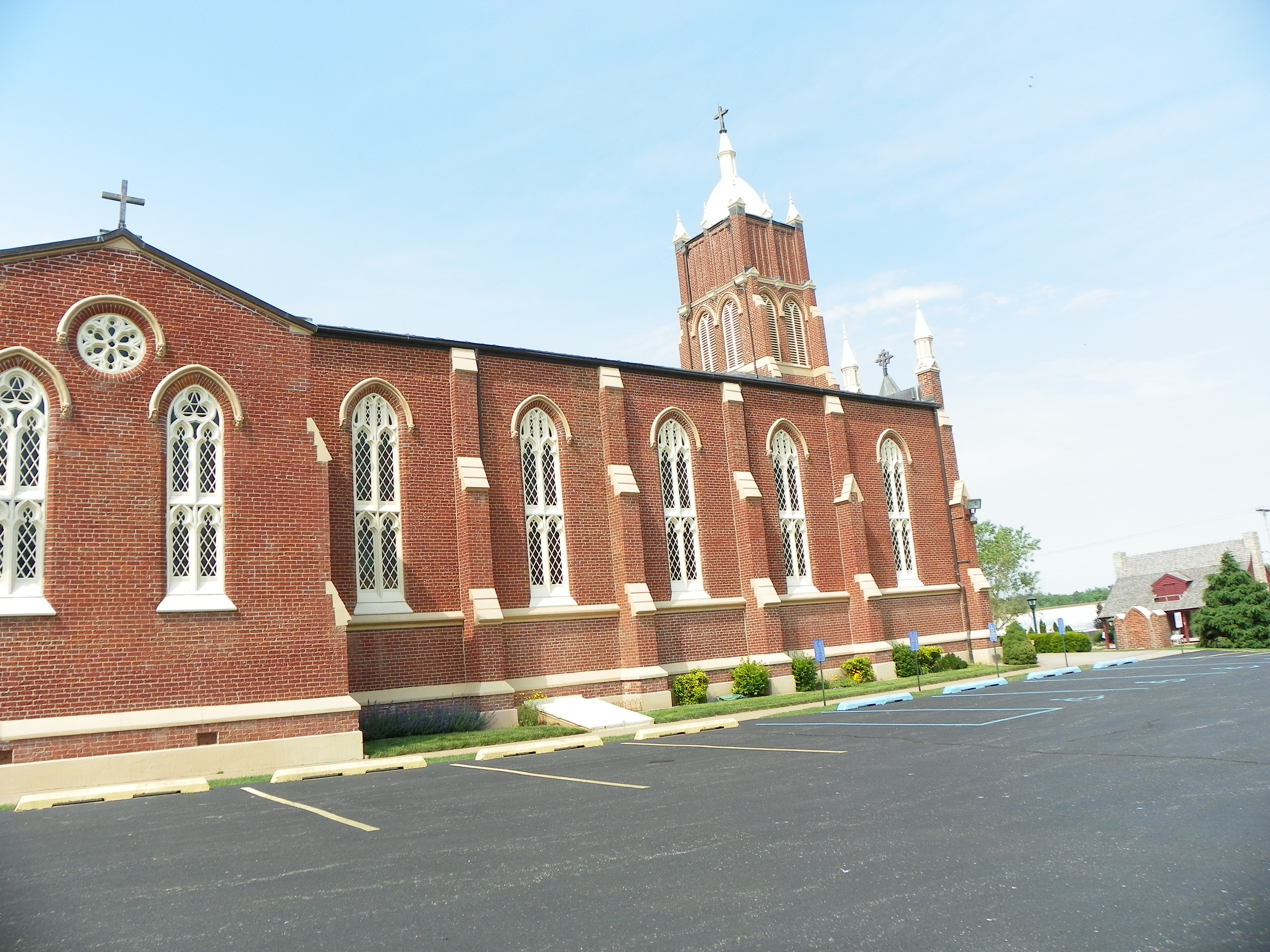
South side of church

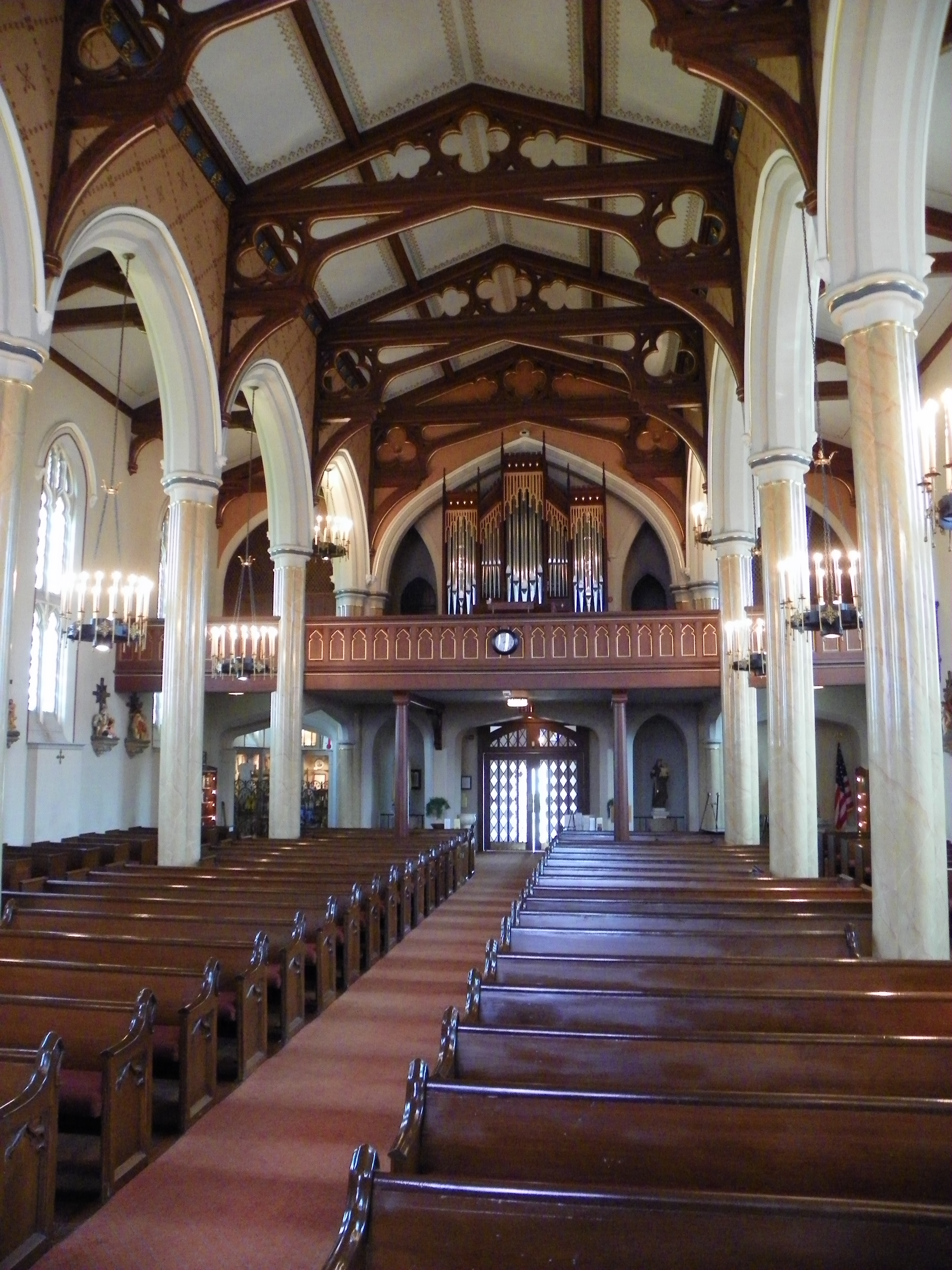
Interior

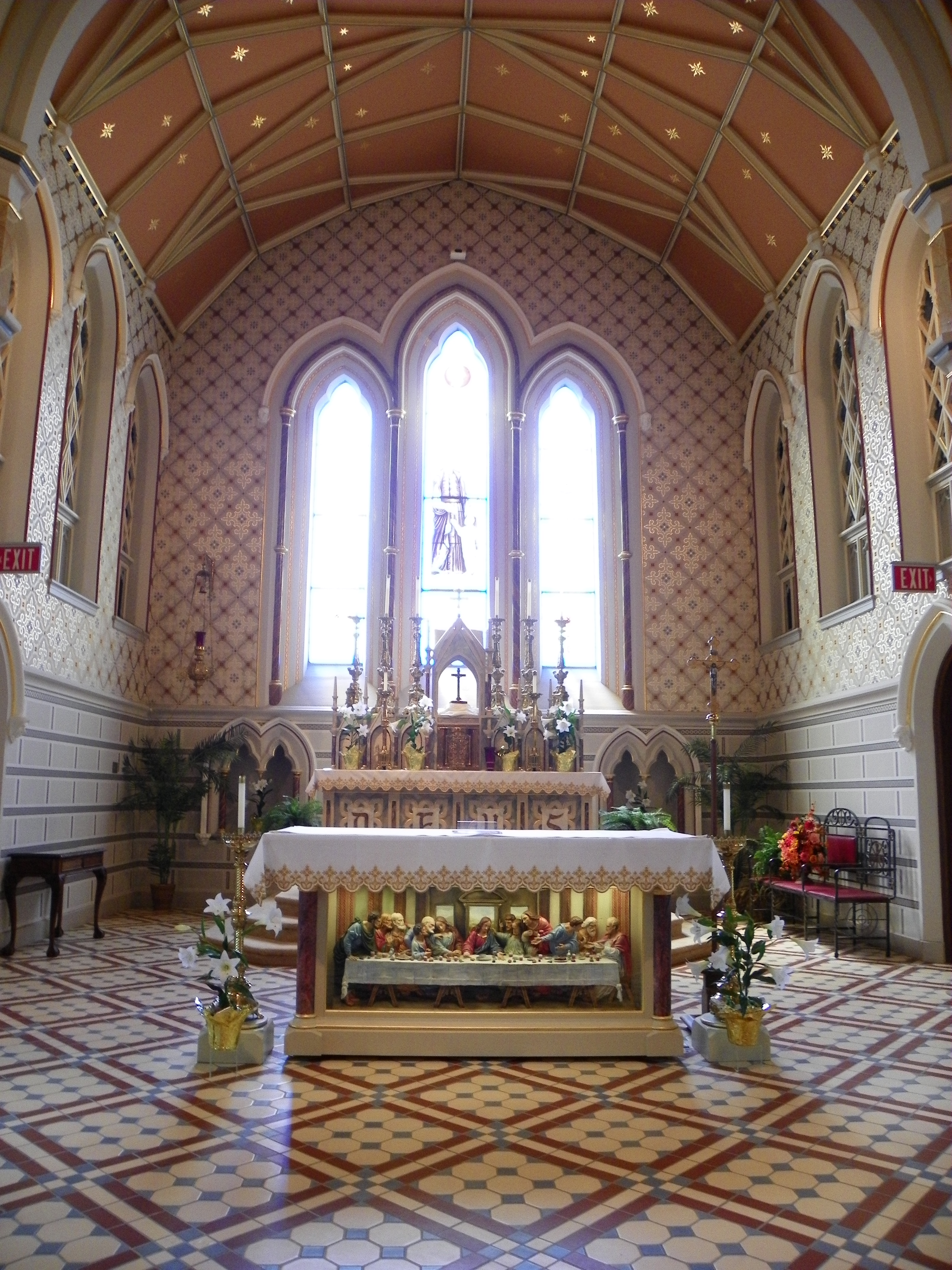
Altar

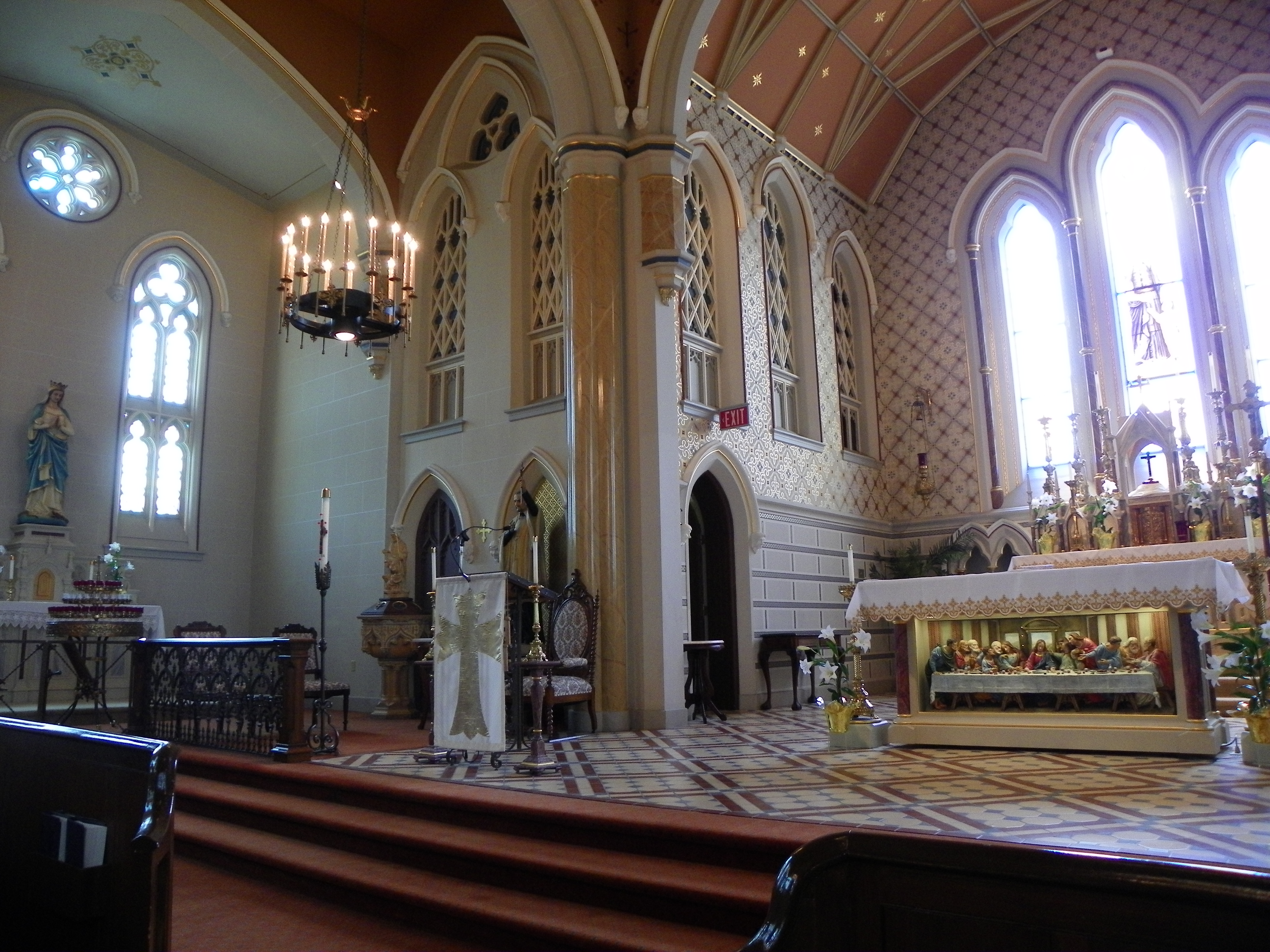
Interior

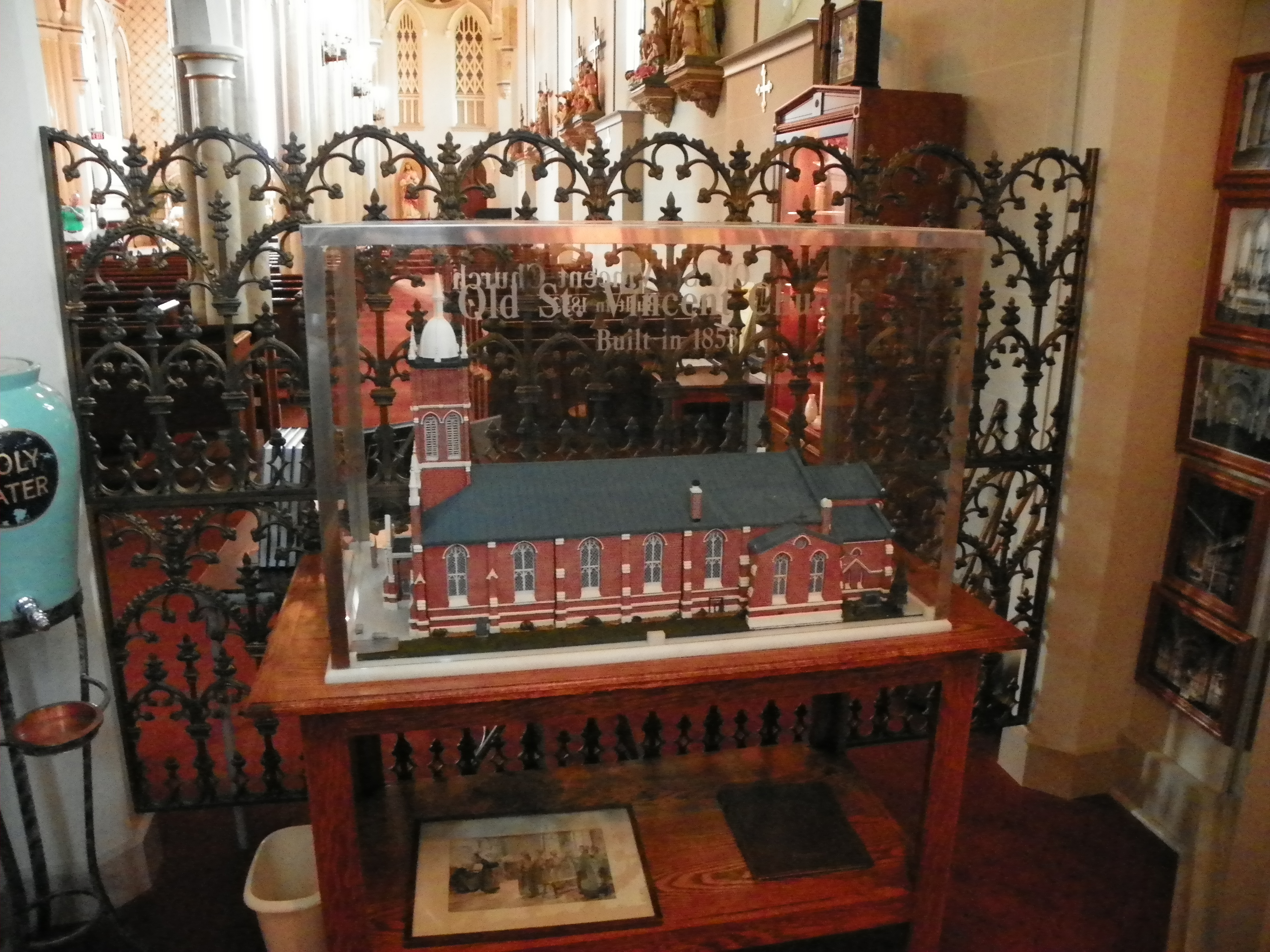
Modal

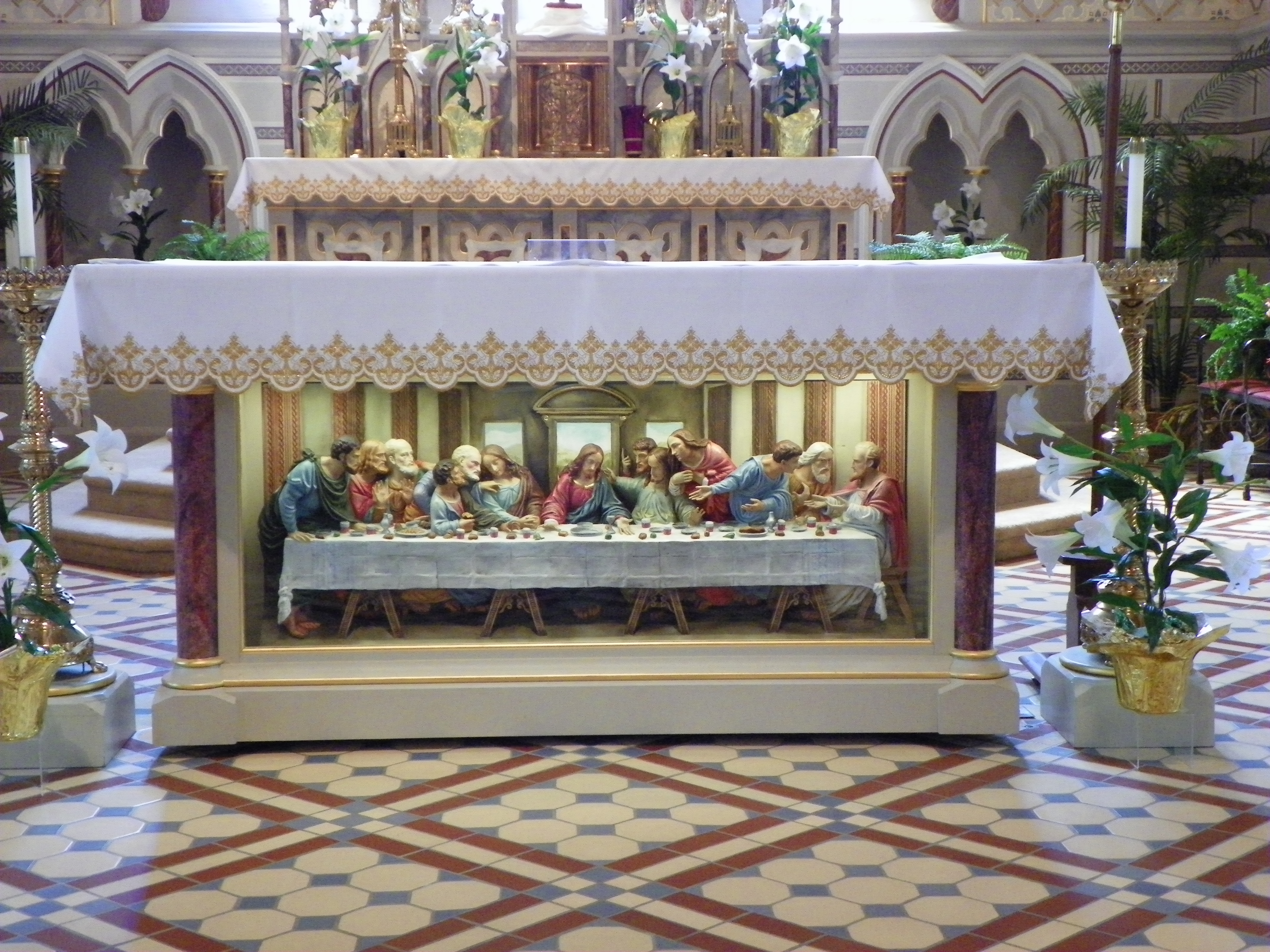
Church altar

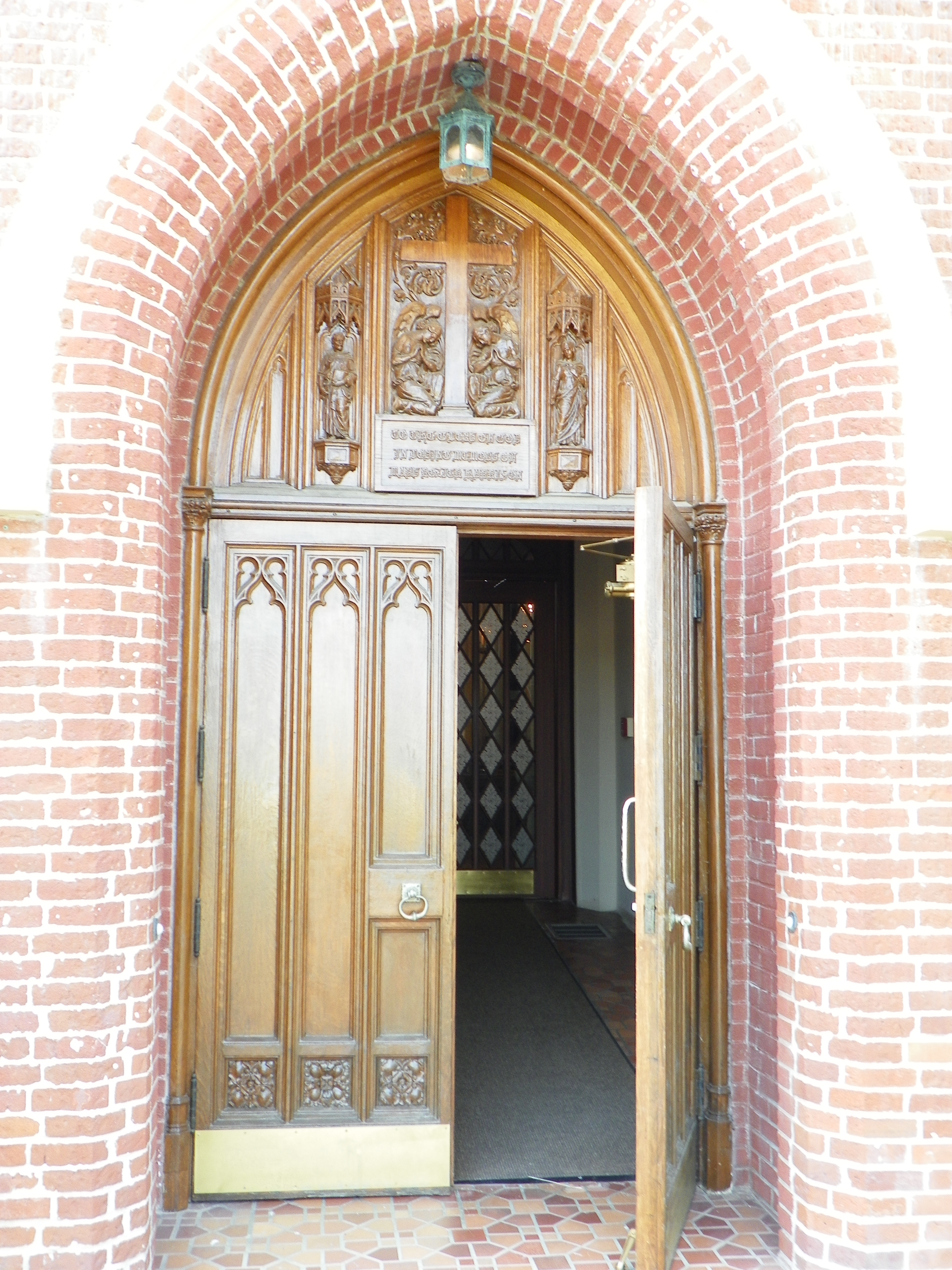
Entrance

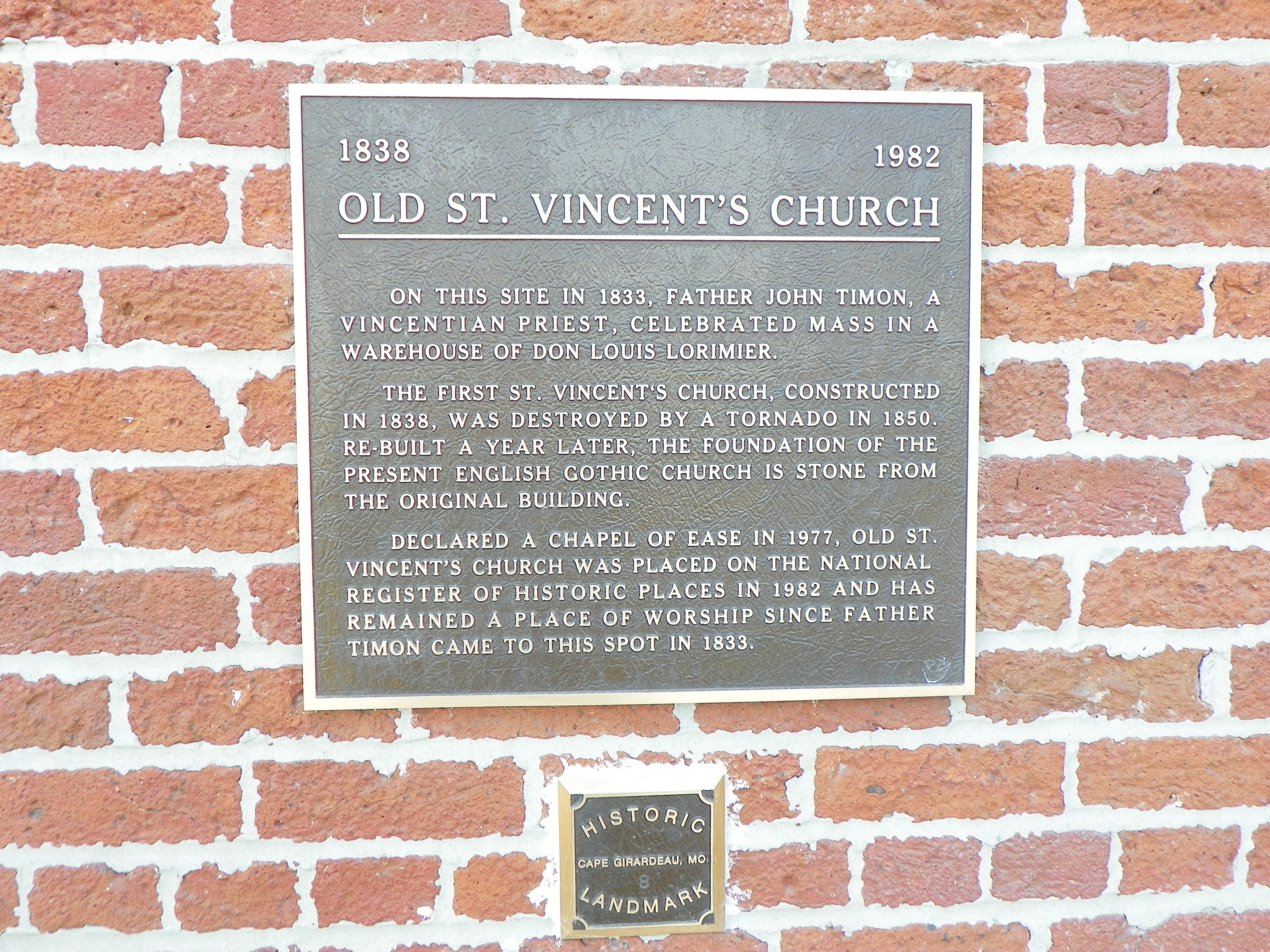
National Historical Plaque
