= Thomas Waryng Walsh =

American architect

Thomas Waryng Walsh (c. 1826 – 1890) was an American architect based in St. Louis, Missouri.

An architect named Thomas Walsh hosted, in his offices, a meeting of 13 men in 1858 which organized the St. Louis Architectural Association.

He was born in Kilkenny, Ireland in 1826 (or 1827) and came to St. Louis in 1852. He was reported in 1890 to have died recently, aged 65.

He designed the St. Vincent De Paul Catholic Church, at 131 South Main St. Cape Girardeau, Missouri, which is listed on the National Register of Historic Places. He also designed the gothic-style St. Peter & Paul Catholic Church in Alton, Illinois, which was constructed in 1855 at a cost $35,000 from local limestone.

He worked together with architect Joseph C. Edgar during 1850 to 1853 to complete the Campbell House Museum, the Disciples of Christ Christian Church on Fifth Street (demolished), the Old St. Vincent's Catholic Church in Cape Girardeau, and the Kirkwood Hotel which was lost to fire in 1867.
