= Gilberto Fernández (bishop) =

Cuban-born American Roman Catholic prelate

His Excellence, The Most Reverend Gilberto Fernández
- Auxiliary Bishop of Miami
- Church: Catholic Church
- See: Miami
- In office: June 23, 1997 thru December 10, 2002
- Previous post: Titular Bishop of Hirina

Orders
- Ordination: May 17, 1959 by Manuel Arteaga y Betancourt
- Consecration: June 23, 1997 by John Clement Favalora

Personal details
- Born: February 13, 1935 Havana, Cuba
- Died: September 30, 2011 (aged 76) Miami, Florida, US
- Education: El Buen Pastor Seminary
- Motto: Amor ultimata ratio (Love is the ultimate reason)

Gilberto Fernández del Villar (February 13, 1935 – September 30, 2011) was a Cuban-born prelate of the Roman Catholic Church in the United States. He served as an auxiliary bishop of the Archdiocese of Miami in Florida from 1997 to 2002

== Early life ==
Gilberto Fernández was born on February 13, 1935 in Havana, Cuba, to Jose Fernández and Consuelo Villar. He studied at El Buen Pastor Seminary in Havana.

== Priesthood ==
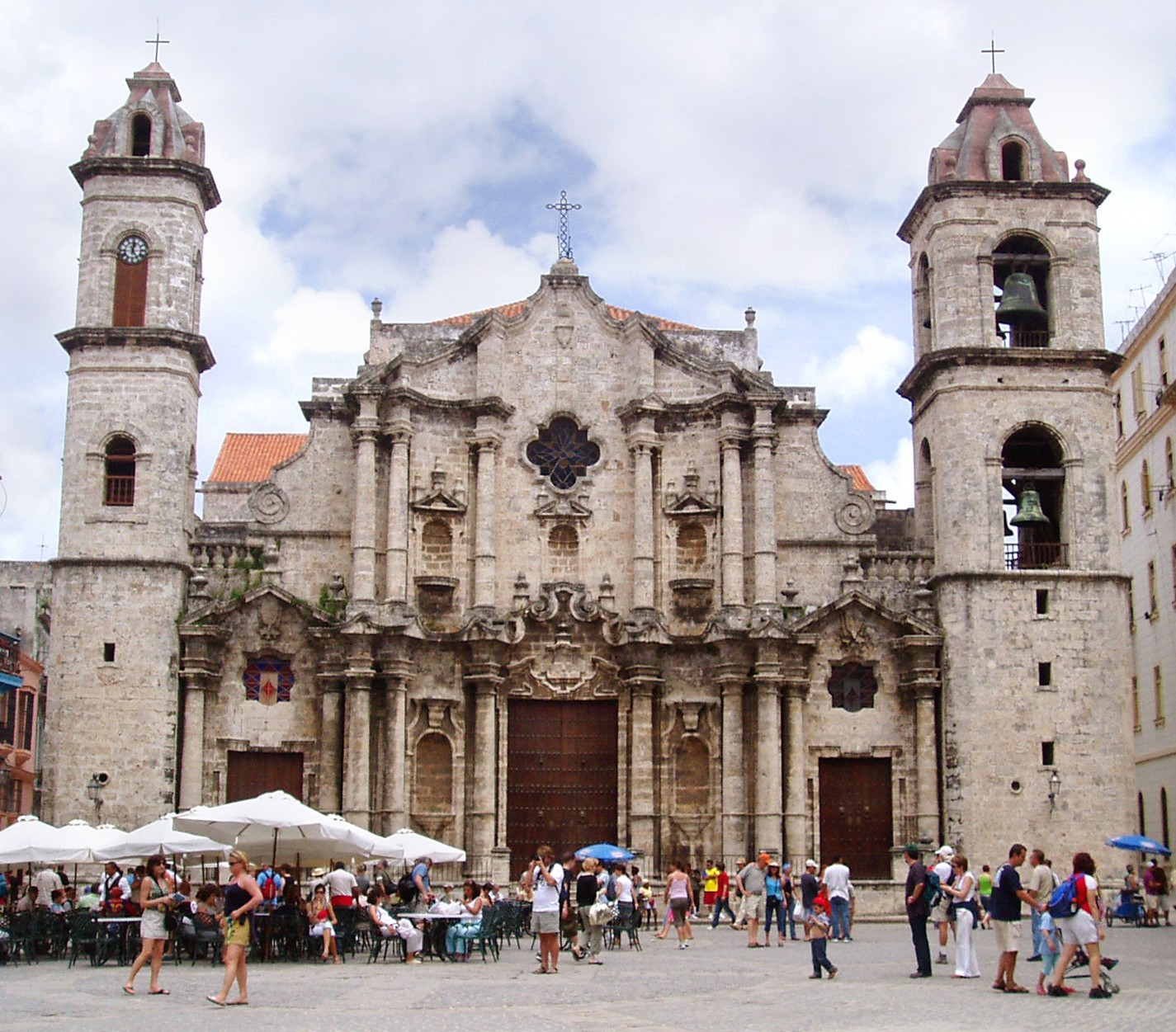
Catedral de San Cristóbal, Havana, Cuba (2008)

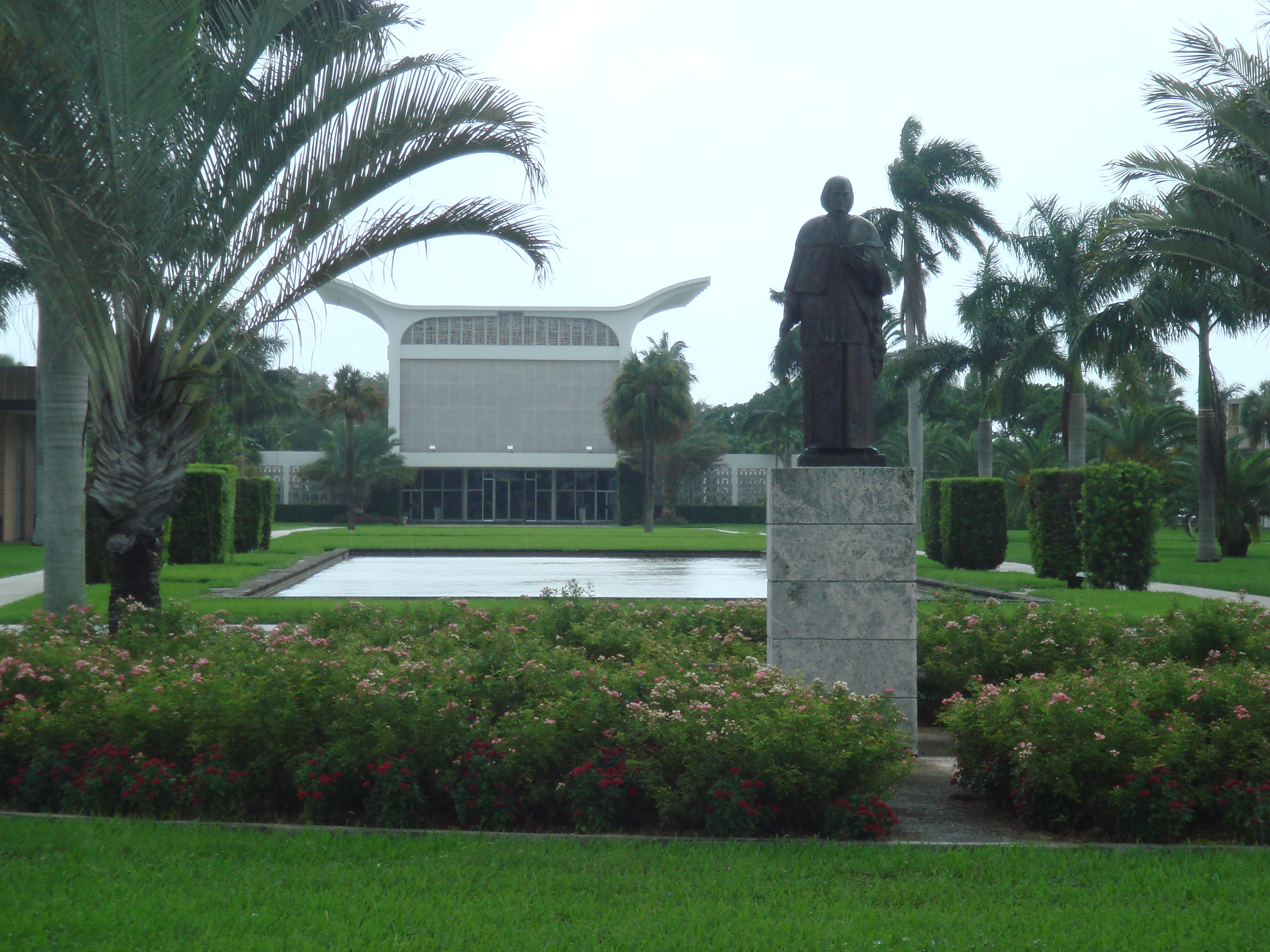
Saint John Vianney College Seminary, Miami, Florida (2008)

Fernández was ordained a priest by Cardinal Manuel Arteaga y Betancourt for the Archdiocese of San Cristobal de la Habana in Havana on May 17, 1959. He served in four parishes in Cuba:

- Assistant pastor for El Salvador in Cerro, Havana (1959 – 1960)
- Administrator of St. Peter's in Batabanó, Havana (1960 – 1961)
- Administrator of the Catedral de San Cristóbal in Havana (1961 – 1962)
- Pastor of El Cerro in Havana (1962 – 1966)

Fernández immigrated to the United States in 1967. Within the Archdiocese of Miami, he had the following parish assignments:

- Assistant pastor at St. Ann's Mission in Naranja (1967 – 1969)
- Administrator of Our Lady Queen of Peace in Delray Beach (1969 – 1971),
- Assistant pastor at St. Patrick in Miami Beach (1971 – 1974)
- Pastor at Sacred Heart in Homestead (1974 – 1979)
- Pastor of Sts. Peter and Paul in Miami (1979 – 1988)
- Pastor at San Pablo in Marathon (1988 – 1989)
- Pastor at St. Kevin in Miami (1989 – 1996)

In 1996, Fernández was appointed as the spiritual director of the St. John Vianney Seminary in Miami.He was incardinated, or transferred, into the Archdiocese of Miami in 1997.

== Auxiliary Bishop of Miami ==
Fernández was appointed by Pope John Paul II as an auxiliary bishop of Miami and the titular bishop of Hirina on June 23, 1997. He was consecrated a bishop on September 3, 1997 at the Miami Arena in Miami. His principal consecrator was Archbishop John Clement Favalora, with Archbishop Edward Anthony McCarthy and Auxiliary Bishop Agustin Roman as co-consecrators.

== Retirement and legacy ==
Fernández resigned as auxiliary bishop of Miami due to health problems on December 10, 2002.

Fernández died, after a long illness, on September 30, 2011, at age 76. Archbishop Thomas G. Wenski celebrated a funeral mass for him at St. Mary Cathedral on October 3, 2011. Wenski called Fernández his "twin," referring to their being consecrated in the same ceremony. Speaking about Fernández, Wenski said, "We trust that he will continue to pray for us as we now entrust his soul to the Lord. May he rest in peace." Fernández was buried in Our Lady of Mercy Cemetery in Miami.

== Episcopal succession ==
Catholic Church titles
| Preceded by – | Auxiliary Bishop of Miami; 1997–2002 | Succeeded by – |
