= Roman Catholic Ecclesiastical Province of Miami =

Coordinates: 25.8615°N 80.1804°W

The Ecclesiastical Province of Miami is a Catholic ecclesiastical province covering the U.S. state of Florida. Its metropolitan bishop is the Archbishop of Miami, head of the Archdiocese of Miami. The province additionally includes the suffragan dioceses of Orlando, Palm Beach, Pensacola-Tallahassee, St. Augustine, St. Petersburg, and Venice.

== History ==
Pope Paul VI made Miami a metropolitan see in 1968.

== Education ==
There were 218 Catholic schools in Florida in 2008. Elementary schools are accredited by the Florida Catholic Conference. Catholic high schools are accredited by the Southern Association of Colleges and Schools. In 2009, there were about 87,000 Catholic school students in Florida.

There were 35 secondary schools in Florida in 2009. They graduated 5,500 students.

Attendance of said Catholic Schools has increased over the past decade, giving this province that rare distinction.

== Organizations ==
As of 2019, the Knights of Columbus Florida State Council reported over 55,000 members across more than 300 local councils. This makes Florida one of the largest jurisdictions within the Knights of Columbus organization. As of 2024, the Knights reported having over 2.1 million members around the world.

== Metropolitans ==
The following archbishops have served as Metropolitans of the Province:

1. Archbishop Coleman Carroll (1968–1977) (had been bishop of Miami since 1958)
2. Archbishop Edward Anthony McCarthy (1976–1994)
3. Archbishop John Favalora 1994–2010
4. Archbishop Thomas Wenski 2010 - current

== See also ==
- List of the Catholic bishops of the United States
- List of the Catholic cathedrals of the United States
- List of the Catholic dioceses of the United States
- Bishop (Catholic Church)
- Catholic Church hierarchy
- Roman Catholicism in the United States
- Catholicism and American politics
- History of Roman Catholicism in the United States
- Catholic Church by country
- Christianity in the United States
- United States Conference of Catholic Bishops
