= Enrique Esteban Delgado =

Peruvian-born prelate

His Excellency, The Most Reverend Enrique Esteban Delgado
- Auxiliary Bishop of Miami; Titular Bishop of Aquae Novae in Proconsulari
- Archdiocese: Miami
- Appointed: October 12, 2017
- Installed: December 7, 2017
- Other post: Titular Bishop of Aquae Novae in Proconsulari

Orders
- Ordination: June 29, 1996 by Agustin Roman
- Consecration: December 7, 2017 by Thomas Wenski, Felipe de Jesús Estévez, and John Gerard Noonan

Personal details
- Born: December 26, 1955 (age 70) Lima, Peru
- Education: University of Lima; St. Vincent de Paul Regional Seminary; St. Thomas University
- Motto: Omnia possum in eo qui me confortat (I can do everything in Him who strengthens me)

Styles of Enrique Esteban Delgado
- Reference style: His Excellency; The Most Reverend
- Spoken style: Your Excellency
- Religious style: Bishop

Enrique Esteban Delgado (born December 26, 1955) is a Peruvian-born prelate of the Roman Catholic Church who has been serving as an auxiliary bishop for the Archdiocese of Miami in Florida since 2017.

== Biography ==
=== Early life ===
Enrique Delgado was born on December 26, 1955, in Lima, Peru. As a child, he was an altar server, then a catechist. He attended the University of Lima in Lima, Peru, receiving a Master of Arts in economics. After his graduation, Delgado worked for several years managing a company with 150 employees in Peru.

During an international business trip in 1989, he made a stopover in Miami and spent a night at Saint John Vianney Seminary in Boynton Beach, Florida. While in Tokyo attending mass in the chapel at Sophia University, he decided to enter the priesthood.

Delgado immigrated to the United States in 1991 to enter the seminary. He received a Master of Theology degree from the St. Vincent de Paul Regional Seminary in Boynton Beach in 1995 and a Master of Divinity degree in 1996.

=== Priesthood ===
On June 29, 1996, Delgado was ordained to the priesthood in Peru for the Archdiocese of Miami by Auxiliary Bishop Agustín Román.

After his 1996 ordination, the archdiocese assigned Delgado as parochial vicar at St. Agnes Parish in Key Biscayne, Florida. He was transferred in 1999 to Nativity Catholic Parish in Hollywood, Florida, to serve as parochial vicar there. In 1999, Delgado was named pastor of St. Justin the Martyr Catholic Parish in Key Largo, Florida. After four years at St. Justin, the archdiocese moved him to St. Katharine Drexel Parish in Weston, Florida, to be its pastor.

Delgado received a Doctor of Practical Theology degree on December 19, 2015, from St. Thomas University in Miami Gardens, Florida.

=== Auxiliary Bishop of Miami ===
Pope Francis appointed Delgado as an auxiliary bishop of Miami on October 12, 2017. On December 7, 2017, Delgado was consecrated as a bishop by Archbishop Thomas Wenski, with Bishops Felipe de Jesús Estévez and John Gerard Noonan serving as co-consecrators.

== See also ==
- Catholic Church hierarchy
- Catholic Church in the United States
- Historical list of the Catholic bishops of the United States
- List of Catholic bishops of the United States
- Lists of patriarchs, archbishops, and bishops

== Episcopal succession ==
Catholic Church titles
Preceded by -	Auxiliary Bishop of Miami; 2017-Present	Succeeded by -
