= Agustin Roman =

Cuban-American prelate (1928–2012)

His Excellency, The Most Reverend Agustín Román
- Auxiliary Bishop of Miami; Titular Bishop of Sertei
- Bishop Román at the National Shrine of Our Lady of Charity in Miami.
- Church: Catholic Church
- Archdiocese: Miami
- In office: March 24, 1979–May 5, 2003

Orders
- Ordination: July 5, 1959 by Juan Alberto de la Merced Martín y Villaverde
- Consecration: March 24, 1979 by Edward Anthony McCarthy

Personal details
- Born: May 5, 1928 San Antonio de los Baños, Cuba
- Died: April 11, 2012 (aged 83) Miami, Florida, US
- Motto: Vae enim mimi est si no evangelizavero (For woe to me if I do not preach the gospel)

Agustín Aleido Román Rodríguez (May 5, 1928 – April 11, 2012) was a Cuban-born prelate of the Román Catholic Church in the United States. He served as an auxiliary bishop of the Archdiocese of Miami in Florida from 1979 to 2003.

== Early life ==
Agustín Román was born in San Antonio de los Baños, Cuba, on May 5, 1928 to Rosendo Román and Juana M. Rodríguez. Deciding to become a priest, Román entered the St. Albert the Great Seminary in Matanzas to study philosophy. He continued his preparation at the Seminary of the Fathers of Foreign Missions in Montreal, Quebec, studying theology.

== Priesthood ==
Román was ordained a priest for the Diocese of Matanzas in Cuba on July 5, 1959 by Bishop Juan Alberto de la Merced Martín y Villaverde. After his ordination, the diocese assigned Román to the pastor staff of parishes in Coliseo-Lagunillas and Pedro Betancourt. He was also named spiritual director of Juventud Católica (Catholic Youth).

The Government of Cuba expelled Román in September 1961 along with 130 other priests and the auxiliary bishop of the Archdiocese of Havana. Román then went Spain and later to Chile. From 1962 to 1966, he served as spiritual director and professor at the Institute of Humanities in Temuco, Chile. He was also assigned to the pastoral staff of Espíritu parish in Temuco.

Román moved to the United States in 1966, becoming the Catholic chaplain in 1967 of Mercy Hospital in Miami, Florida. That same year, he was named director of the Our Lady of Charity Shrine. A strong advocate for the Cuban community in Miami, he raised money from them for the shrine's construction. In 1977, the archdiocese appointed Román as spiritual director of the Charismatic movement and in 1978 as director of the Spanish-language Cursillo movement.

Román received a Master of Religious Studies degree from Barry University in Miami Shores, Florida, and a Master of Human Resources from St. Thomas University in Miami Gardens, Florida.

== Auxiliary Bishop of Miami ==
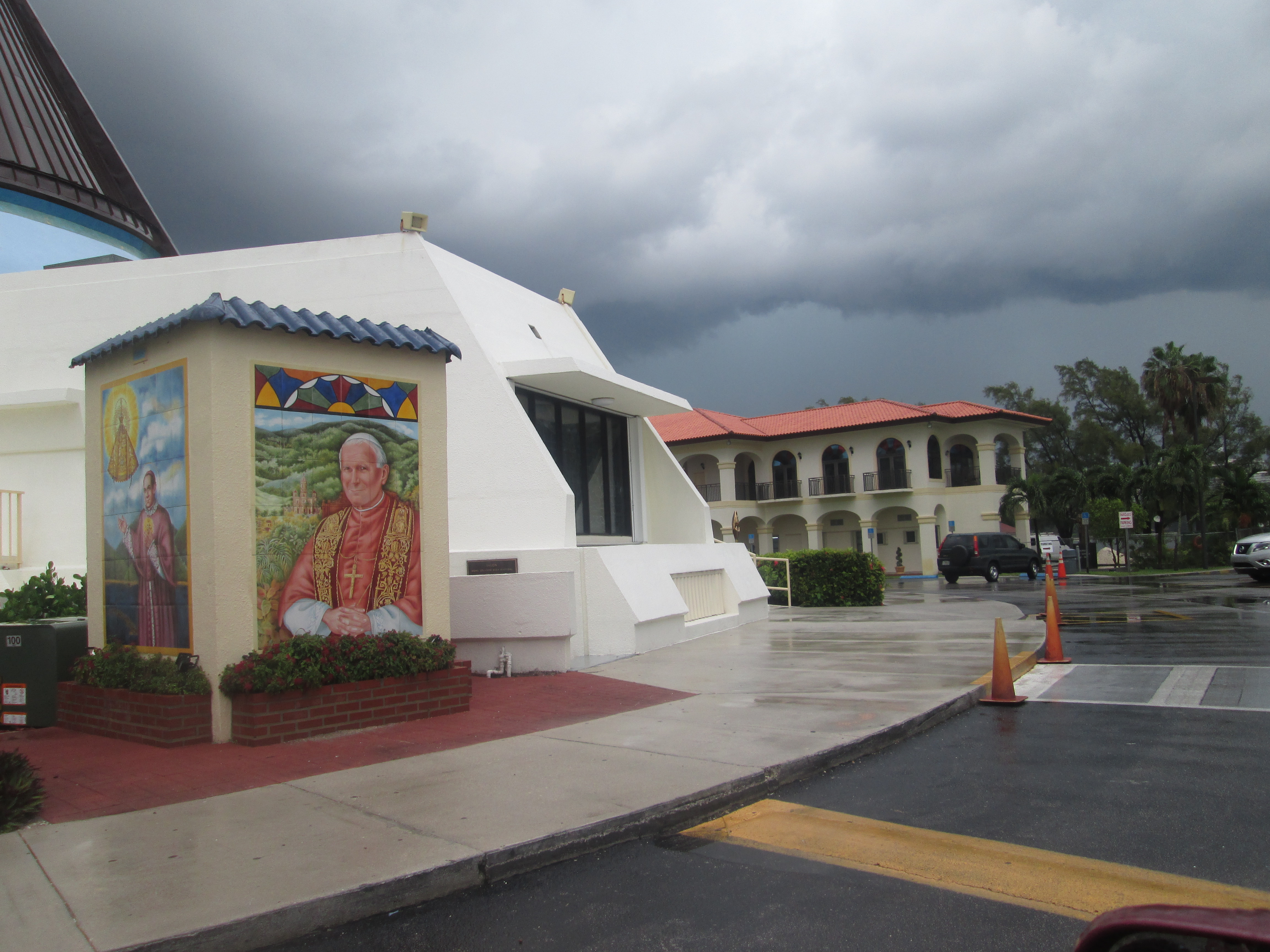
National Shrine of Our Lady of Charity, Miami, Florida (2024)

On February 6, 1979, Román was appointed by Pope John Paul II as an auxiliary bishop of Miami and titular bishop of Sertei. He was consecrated by Archbishop, Edward Anthony McCarthy at the Miami Beach Convention Center in Miami Beach, Florida, on March 24, 1979. Román became the first Cuban to serve as a Catholic bishop in the United States.

From 1979 to 1997, he served as executive director of the Ministry of Pastoral Service, which includes Hispanic movements, ministry to Haitian immigrant, African-Americans. and other cultural groups, ministry to families, youth, young adults, the sick, the handicapped, farmworkers, prisoners, and Respect Life. From 1997 to 2003 he also served as director of the Ministry of Persons, which includes priests, religious and laity.

In 1987, Cuban detainees from the 1980 Mariel Boatlift rioted in federal prisons in Atlanta, Georgia, and Oakdale, Louisiana. The men were protesting their indefinite incarceration and possible deportation back to Cuba. Román served as a negotiator between the Cubans and US Government, peacefully resolving the standoff. For his service, ABC News named him as their "Person of the Week" In response to people calling him a hero, Roman replied "A bishop, a priest, is a servant, not a hero."

== Retirement and legacy ==
On May 5, 2003, Román turned 75 and, as required under canon law, submitted his resignation as auxiliary bishop of Miami. On April 11, 2012, Román suffered a cardiac arrest while at the National Shrine. Transported to Mercy Hospital in Miami, he died that same day at age 83.

Archbishop Thomas Gerard Wenski served as the principal celebrant of the funeral mass at the Cathedral of Saint Mary on April 14. Attendees included Archbishop Emeritus John Clement Favalora, Archbishop Carlo Maria Vigano, the apostolic nuncio to Haiti, Bernardito Auza, Archbishop Dionisio García of the Archdiocese of Santiago de Cuba, Bishop Mario Eusebio Mestril Vega of the Diocese of Ciego de Avila, and Bishop Emilio Aranguren of the Diocese of Holguín. Wenski referred to Roman as the Felix Varela of our time. Florida Governor Rick Scott and U.S. Representative Ileana Ros-Lehtinen offered their condolences.

== Apostolic succession ==
The apostolic succession list:

- Archbishop Edward Anthony McCarthy (1965)
- Archbishop Karl Joseph Alter (1931)
- Archbishop John Timothy McNicholas OP (1918)
- Cardinal Tommaso Pio Boggiani OP (1908)
- Cardinal Rafael Merry del Val y Zulueta (1900)
- Cardinal Mariano Rampolla del Tindaro (1882)
- Cardinal Edward Henry Howard (1872)
- Cardinal Carlo Sacconi (1851)
- Cardinal Giacomo Filippo Fransoni (1822)
- Cardinal Pietro Francesco Galleffi (1819)
- Cardinal Alessandro Mattei (1777)
- Cardinal Bernardino Giraud (1767)
- Pope Carlo della Torre Rezzonico (1743)
- Pope Prospero Lorenzo Lambertini (1724)
- Pope Pietro Francesco (Vincenzo Maria) Orsini de Gravina OP (1675)
- Cardinal Paluzzo Paluzzi Altieri Degli Albertoni (1666)
- Cardinal Ulderico Carpegna (1630)
- Cardinal Luigi Caetani (1622)
- Cardinal Ludovico Ludovisi (1621)
- Archbishop Galeazzo Sanvitale (1604)
- Cardinal Girolamo Bernerio OP (1586)
- Cardinal Giulio Antonio Santorio (1566)
- Scipione Cardinal Rebiba
