= Saint Edward Catholic Church, Pembroke Pines =

Building in Florida, United States

Saint Edward Catholic Church

Religion
- Affiliation: Roman Catholic
- Leadership: Rev. Albert Lahens
- Status: Active parish

Location
- Location: 19000 Pines Boulevard; Pembroke Pines, Florida, US
- Interactive map of Saint Edward Catholic Church
- Territory: Archdiocese of Miami
- Coordinates: 26.0056°N 80.4031°W

Architecture
- Groundbreaking: 4 October 1998
- Completed: 1999
- Construction cost: $3,000,000

Website
- www.stedward.net

Saint Edward Catholic Church in Pembroke Pines, Florida, was established in 1995 and constructed in 1999. Part of the Roman Catholic Archdiocese of Miami, this charismatic parish is located in western Broward County. Located on 190th Avenue, it was the first church ever built west of Interstate 75 in Broward County and in the City of Pembroke Pines.

== History ==
Named after Saint Edward the Confessor, the parish was established in 1994. In one of his final acts before retirement, Miami Archbishop Edward McCarthy appointed Rev. Fr. Michael J. Eivers pastor of the new church. Eivers was one of the pioneers in the introduction of cell groups to the Catholic community. The first parish authorized in western Broward County within the Catholic Church, a 13-acre site was marked for use by the organization on the site of an old bar.

The first Mass under the parish name took place on 26 February 1995 in the home of a parishioner. Additional locations would include a movie theatre and Chapel Trail Elementary School while the community grew and funding allowed for the development of a permanent facility. By 1996, St. Edward had six hundred registered families when construction on a permanent building was started. By the time the church's three million dollar Parish Center had been completed in October 1999, this number had grown to approximately eleven hundred.

Dedicated on 22 January 2000, the Parish Center provided parish offices and a multi-functioning building with an adoration chapel, [Religious Education] classrooms for over two thousand students yearly and a church with seating for approximately one thousand people. The building featured a completely new design within the Archdiocese of Miami. Presiding at the dedication of the facility were retired Archdiocese of Miami Archbishop Edward McCarthy and then current Archbishop John C. Favalora. The pastor of the church was elevated to the title of Monsignor during the ceremony.

The closest religious institution to US 27 within the county, it was the first church ever built west of Interstate 75 in Broward County and in western Pembroke Pines.

By the beginning of 2005, the church community had grown to over three thousand registered families. The multicultural parish has members representing over seventy-two different nationalities. The church was estimated to have four thousand registered families in early 2006. With the opening of the first building at neighboring Saint John XXIII Catholic Church in nearby western Miramar in 2010, the parish's population has reportedly stabilized somewhere near three thousand registered families.

== Clergy ==
The following individuals have led Saint Edward Catholic Church since its creation:

=== Priests ===
Tenure	Name	Designation	Position
1995 – 2011	Eivers, Michael J.	Rev. Msgr.	Pastor
1997 – 2003	Mitchell, Walter	Rev.	Assistant Pastor
2002 – 2003	de Paula, Cristobal	Rev.	Parochial Vicar
2003 – 2009	Sarmiento, Oscar	Rev.	Parochial Vicar
2009 – 2010	Plancher, Christian	Rev., s.m.m.	Parochial Vicar
2010 – 2021	Lahens, Albert	Rev.	Parochial Vicar
2011 – 2021	Peloso, John	Rev.	Pastor
2021 – 2024	Lahens Jr., Albert	Rev.	Parish Administrator
2022 – Present	Aduseh Poku, John	Rev.	Parochial Vicar
2024 – Present	Lahens Jr., Albert	Rev.	Pastor

=== Deacons ===
Tenure	Name	Position
1995 - 2011	DeLuca, Arnold	Parish Administrator
2005 – Present	Cramer, Carl	
2008 – 2013	Ganuza, Mario	

== See also ==
- Catholic Charismatic Renewal
- Cell Groups
