= Sexual abuse scandal in the Roman Catholic Archdiocese of Miami =

The sexual abuse scandal in Miami archdiocese is part of the Catholic sex abuse cases in the United States and Ireland. The Roman Catholic Archdiocese of Miami is the largest non-governmental provider of social services and operates the largest non-governmental school and hospital system in South Florida.

== Amount of money and abusers ==
Since 1966, the Archdiocese of Miami insurance programs have paid $26.1 million in settlement, legal and counseling costs associated with sexual misconduct allegations made by minors involving non-clergy employees and volunteers, religious brothers and sisters and priests. In the past 50 years, a total of 4,433 priests have worked in the archdiocese. Forty-nine of them have been accused of some sort of sexual misconduct, not all of it dealing with minors.

== Number of lawsuits ==
There were six lawsuits pending as of 2007.

In 2003, The Miami Herald reported that, since the archdiocese began insurance coverage in 1966, insurance companies have paid $9.3 million for settlement, legal and counseling costs to resolve claims of sexual abuse by priests and other employees of the Archdiocese of Miami. This included 90 abuse claims by minors. In the late 1990s the church entered into confidential settlements of abuse cases which are not reflected in the reported total dollar amount.

On March 15, 2019, Reverend Jean Claude Jean-Philippe of Homestead was arrested on charges of drugging and raping a female parishioner who he invited to his home the previous October.

== Doherty affair ==
Archbishop John Favalora has been deposed in a lawsuit filed against retired Broward priest Neil Doherty; at least four lawsuits alleged the Archdiocese knew Doherty was a child sexual abuser and covered up allegations. Doherty was removed from ministry in 2002 by Archbishop Favalora. Three years later, in 2005, he was first publicly accused of sexual abuse. Favalora claims in his published deposition that he removed Doherty after going through approximately 400 priest personal files and found old allegations of abuse against Doherty that took place under the administration of the previous and now deceased archbishop.

Two of these Doherty cases were settled together with four others in July 2006 for $750,000.

== Mercieca affair ==
In October 2006, U.S. congressman Mark Foley revealed that he was molested as a 16-year-old by Fr. Anthony Mercieca who acknowledged the molestation. Although Foley never filed suit, another man came forward shortly thereafter and filed a lawsuit anonymously claiming similar abuse. That lawsuit was settled in July 2007. Fr. Mercieca denied any abuse of the second man.

== 2007 lawsuits ==
In July 2007, Miami lawyer Jeffrey Herman announced new lawsuits against the Archdiocese, alleging sexual abuse by six previously accused priests, including Neil Doherty. One of the lawsuits is for an allegation that was previously investigated by the State Attorney's office and was deemed not credible. The investigation was dropped and the priest remains active in ministry. The Archdiocese has stated it will defend him vigorously. Jeffrey Herman's license to practice law was suspended for two years for ethics violations.

== Charter rules ==
In 1997, soon after becoming archbishop, John Favalora responded to these scandals by adopting the Charter for the Protection of Young People. This charter, which was adopted by all U.S. bishops several years later in response to similar abuse in other dioceses, requires all priests, employees, and volunteers of the archdiocese to be fingerprinted and have a background check.

All allegations of sexual abuse are required to be reported to the police. Suspected offenders are suspended pending the outcome of an investigation. If the allegations are deemed by investigators to be credible, the suspected offender is relieved of duties and prosecuted. Counseling is offered for victims.

== Extensive media coverage ==
Some commentators have argued that media coverage of the issue has been excessive, given that the same problems plague other institutions, such as the US public school system, with much greater frequency. Notwithstanding, Archbishop John Favalora responded to these scandals by being the first US bishop to implement background checks and fingerprinting rules for all volunteers and employees working with children and vulnerable adults, a rule subsequently adopted by all US bishops.

== See also ==
- Abuse
- Charter for the Protection of Children and Young People
- Child abuse
- Child sexual abuse
- Essential Norms
- National Review Board
- Pontifical Commission for the Protection of Minors
- Religious abuse
- Sexual abuse
- Sexual misconduct
- Spiritual abuse
