= Thomas Wenski =

American Catholic prelate (born 1950)

His Excellency, The Most Reverend Thomas Wenski
- Archbishop of Miami; Ecclesiastical Superior of the Cayman Islands
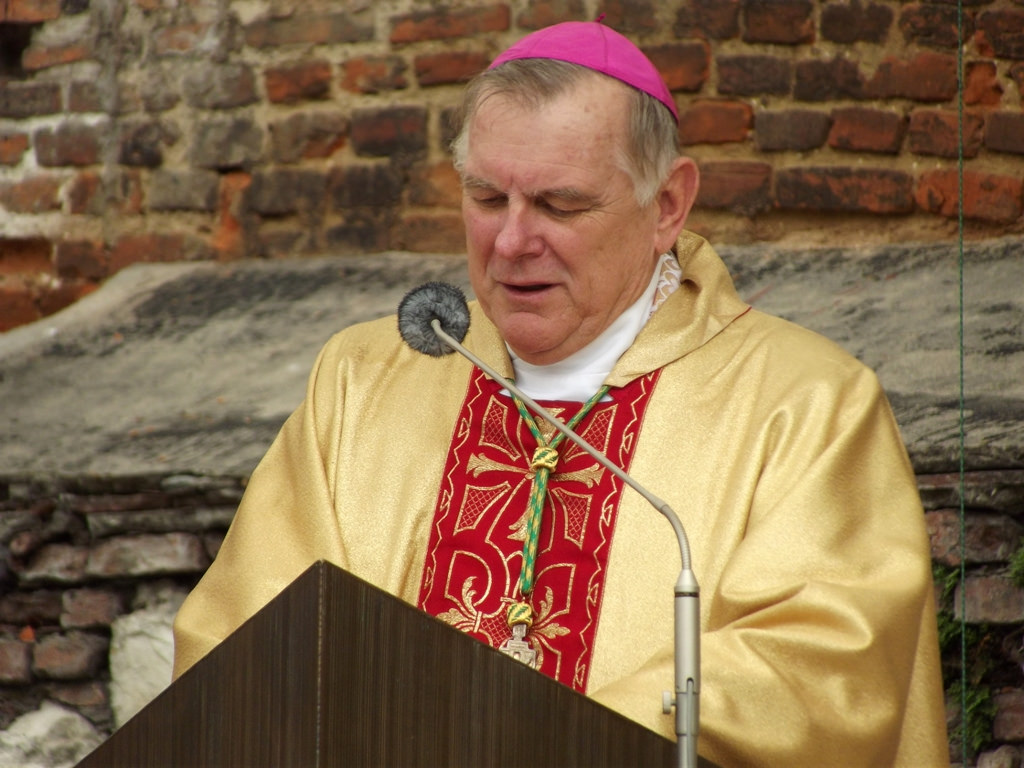
- Wenski in 2014
- Archdiocese: Miami
- Appointed: April 20, 2010
- Installed: June 1, 2010
- Predecessor: John Clement Favalora
- Previous posts: Bishop of Orlando (2004–2010); Coadjutor Bishop of Orlando (2003–2004); Auxiliary Bishop of Miami and Titular Bishop of Kearney (1997–2003)

Orders
- Ordination: May 15, 1976 by Coleman Carroll
- Consecration: September 3, 1997 by John Favalora, Edward A. McCarthy, and Agustin Roman

Personal details
- Born: October 18, 1950 (age 76) West Palm Beach, Florida, US
- Motto: Omnia omnibus (Latin for 'All things to all men')
- Styles
- Reference style: His Excellency; The Most Reverend
- Spoken style: Your Excellency
- Religious style: Archbishop

Ordination history
History
Episcopal consecration
- Consecrated by: John Favalora (Miami)
- Date: September 3, 1997
Episcopal succession
Bishops consecrated by Thomas Wenski as principal consecrator
- Gregory Parkes: June 5, 2012
- Peter Baldacchino: March 19, 2014

Thomas Gerard Wenski (born October 18, 1950) is an American Catholic prelate serving as Archbishop of Miami since 2010. He previously served as Bishop of Orlando from 2004 to 2010, coadjutor bishop of Orlando from 2003 to 2004, and as Auxiliary Bishop of Miami from 1997 to 2003.

== Early life and education ==
Wenski was born on October 18, 1950, in West Palm Beach, Florida, to Chester and Louise (née Zawacki) Wenski. His father was born in Poland with the last name "Wiśniewski", and came to the United States with his parents in 1910 at age 2. The family eventually adopted the Anglicized version, "Wenski". Both Chester and Louise were raised in the Polish neighborhoods of Detroit, Michigan, but moved to Florida after their marriage. Together they ran a business spray-painting stucco houses.

Wenski was raised in Lake Worth, Florida, where he attended Sacred Heart School. He decided to become a priest in the third grade, later recalling, "I never imagined myself as anything else; it was what God wanted me to do, although I sometimes vacillated on whether I wanted to do it." At age 13, he entered Saint John Vianney Seminary in Miami. During his twelve years at the seminary, he was a self-described "very liberal seminarian," questioning Catholic teaching on clerical celibacy and the ordination of women. His views eventually became more conservative through his experience working with Cuban immigrants and reading about communism in Poland and Cuba. He graduated from St. John Vianney in 1970 with an associate's degree.

Wenski then began his studies in philosophy and theology at St. Vincent de Paul Minor Seminary in Boynton Beach. He earned a Bachelor of Philosophy degree (1972) and a Master of Divinity degree (1975). He later received a Master of Arts degree from the School of Sociology of Fordham University in New York City in 1993, and took summer courses at the Catholic University of Lublin in Lublin, Poland.

== Priesthood ==
Wenski was ordained a priest for the Archdiocese of Miami by Archbishop Coleman Carroll on May 15, 1976. His first assignment was as an associate pastor at Corpus Christi Parish in Miami, where he remained for three years. At Corpus Christi, he took an interest in the Haitian parishioners who attended Mass in Creole; he was later sent to Haiti to study Creole and Haitian culture.

After returning to Miami in 1979, Wenski was appointed to a Haitian apostolate operating out of the Cathedral of Saint Mary. Wenski then served as associate director and later director of the Pierre Toussaint Haitian Catholic Center in Miami until 1997. He also served concurrently as pastor of three Haitian parishes in the archdiocese: Notre-Dame d'Haiti in Miami, Divine Mercy in Fort Lauderdale, and St. Joseph in Pompano Beach. His outreach to the Haitian Catholic community in Miami was initially met with staunch opposition by Haitian priest and activist Gérard Jean-Juste, who later came to regard Wenski as an ally. He also befriended Jean-Bertrand Aristide, a now-laicized priest who later became the first democratically elected President of Haiti,

Wenski celebrated weekly Mass for shut-ins in English at WPLG, the local ABC affiliate, from 1992 to 1997, and directed the Ministry to Non-Hispanic Ethnic Groups. He became an adjunct professor at St. Vincent de Paul Seminary in 1994. In January 1996, Wenski was named director of the archdiocesan Catholic Charities. In this capacity, he helped form a relationship with Caritas Cuba, the social service arm of the Catholic Church in Cuba. Later in 1996, he spearheaded a relief operation that delivered over 150,000 pounds (68,000 kg) of food to Caritas Cuba for distribution to people left homeless by Hurricane Lili.

== Episcopacy ==
=== Auxiliary Bishop of Miami ===
On June 24, 1997, Wenski was appointed auxiliary bishop of the Archdiocese of Miami and titular bishop of Kearney by Pope John Paul II. He received his episcopal consecration on September 3, 1997, from Archbishop John Favalora, with Archbishop Edward A. McCarthy and Bishop Agustin Roman serving as co-consecrators, at the Miami Arena. Wenski selected as his episcopal motto: "All Things to All Men" (1 Corinthians 9:22). As an auxiliary bishop, he served as episcopal vicar for Broward and Monroe Counties.

In addition to his episcopal duties, Wenski served on numerous boards, including Catholic Hospice, Catholic Charities, Catholic Charities Legal Services, and St. Thomas University in Miami Gardens, Florida. He served as chair of Catholic Legal Immigration Network, Inc. (1998–2001), and of the United States Conference of Catholic Bishops' Committee on Migration (2001–2004). He also served on the Miami-Dade County Homeless Trust and the Coordinating Council of Broward, and was appointed by Florida Governor Jeb Bush to the Florida Council on Homelessness, in 2001, and the Task Force on Haiti in 2004.

=== Bishop of Orlando ===
Wenski was appointed coadjutor bishop of the Diocese of Orlando on July 1, 2003, by John Paul II. His installation took place on August 22, 2003. Following the retirement of Bishop Norbert Dorsey, Wenski succeeded him as the fourth bishop of Orlando on November 13, 2004. He was the first Florida-born bishop of Orlando.

Wenski convoked the first synod for the diocese in 2004. He held listening sessions with a diverse group of Catholics to hear about their concerns. He designated 2008 as the "Year of Evangelization," putting a greater emphasis on deepening the faith of all people. At the time of his appointment to Miami in 2010, he was leading the diocese through the early stages of both a $150 million capital campaign and an extensive renovation of St. James Cathedral in Orlando

In October 2007, Wenski was selected to serve on the board of directors of the Florida Specialty Crop Foundation, a non-profit public charity that assists specialty crop producers and their stakeholders. In September 2008, he gave an invocation at the Republican National Convention in Saint Paul, Minnesota. In March 2009, he joined the conservative Catholic Leadership Institute's national advisory board for their "Good Leaders, Good Shepherds" program. In May of that year, Wenski held a Mass of reparation for the University of Notre Dame's decision to have President Barack Obama deliver its commencement speech and receive an honorary degree, given Obama's views on abortion rights for women. At the Mass, he denounced Obama for his "rather extremist views on abortion" and said that Notre Dame's "actions suggest that, unlike a Carrie Prejean, it lacks the courage of its convictions."

In June 2009, Wenski was elected to a four-year term on the board of the Catholic University of America in Washington, D.C. He chaired the USCCB Committee on International Policy (2004–2008), and currently serves as a consultant to the Committee on Migration and a member of the Secretariat for the church in Latin America, Committee for International Justice and Peace, and the Catholic Legal Immigration Network, Inc. Wenski is currently the episcopal moderator for Catholic Health Services for the Florida Catholic Conference.

During his tenure, Wenski created six new parishes and two missions. His capital and endowment campaign raised $100 million. He petitioned and was granted that two diocesan churches be raised to the status of minor basilicas. He started the Spanish language radio station, Buena Nueva FM. along with the Spanish language newspaper, El Clarin.

=== Archbishop of Miami ===
On April 20, 2010, Wenski was appointed the fourth Archbishop of Miami by Pope Benedict XVI. Following his appointment, he said he was "humbled by the Holy Father's confidence in me and aware of my own limitations and shortcomings..." He succeeded Archbishop Favalora. He became the first native of the archdiocese to become its archbishop. Wenski was installed at the Cathedral of Saint Mary on June 1, 2010. At the end of June, he received the pallium, a vestment worn by metropolitan bishops, from Benedict XVI at St. Peter's Basilica.

On February 2, 2012, Wenski celebrated a Pontifical High Mass, a solemn form of Tridentine Mass, the first such celebration in the state of Florida in more than 40 years. Wenski has created the annual Archbishop's Motorcycle Ride, in part due to his enjoying of motorcycles, to raise money for St. Luke's Patient Addiction Recovery Center.

In June 2015, Wenski reacted to the US Supreme Court decision Obergefell v. Hodges, which legalized same sex marriage, by comparing it to the Dred Scott v. Sandford decision. The latter decision, handed down in 1857, effectively classified enslaved African Americans as property rather than people. On August 7, 2016, Wenski and two other Catholic prelates issued a statement condemning Catholic politicians who officiate at same sex weddings. This came a week after then-Vice President Joe Biden officiated a wedding for two male White House staff members.

On November 19, 2026, pastoral care of the Cayman Islands was transferred from the Archdiocese of Detroit to the Archdiocese of Miami thus him being named as the Ecclesiastical Superior of the Cayman Islands.

== See also ==
- Catholic Church hierarchy
- Catholic Church in the United States
- Historical list of the Catholic bishops of the United States
- List of Catholic bishops of the United States
- Lists of patriarchs, archbishops, and bishops

== Episcopal succession ==
Catholic Church titles
Preceded by -	Auxiliary Bishop of Miami; 1997-2003	Succeeded by -
Preceded by Norbert Dorsey	Bishop of Orlando; 2004–2010	Succeeded by John Gerard Noonan
Preceded by John Favalora	Archbishop of Miami; 2010–Present	Succeeded by Incumbent
Preceded by Edward Weisenburger	Ecclesiastical Superior of the Cayman Islands; 2026–Present	Succeeded by Incumbent
