= Cathedral of Saint Mary (Miami) =

Catholic cathedral in Florida, United States

The Cathedral of Saint Mary
- Catedral de Santa María (Spanish); Katedral Sen Mari (Haitian Creole)
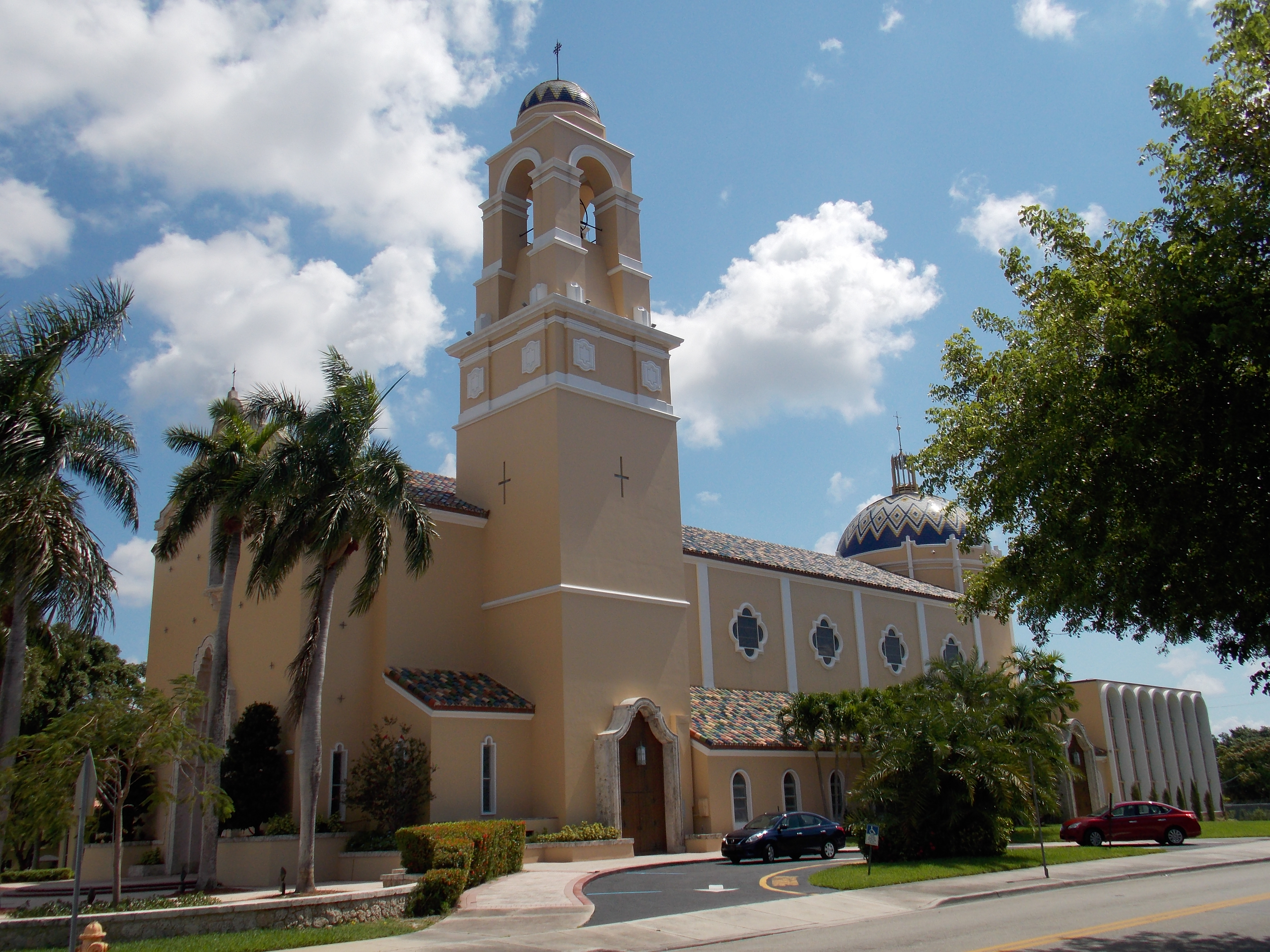

- Location in Florida
- 25°50′38″N 80°12′01″W
- Location: 7525 NW 2nd Ave. Miami, Florida
- Country: United States
- Denomination: Roman Catholic Church
- Website: Official website

History
- Founded: 1930
- Dedicated: January 27, 1957

Architecture
- Style: Spanish Colonial Revival
- Groundbreaking: 1955
- Completed: 1957

Administration
- Archdiocese: Miami

Clergy
- Archbishop: Most Rev. Thomas Wenski (2010)
- Rector: Very Reverend Steven O’Hala, VF
- Vicar: Rev. Reynold Brevil

The Cathedral of Saint Mary (Spanish: Catedral de Santa María de Miami) (Haitian Creole: Katedral Sen Mari) is the seat of the archbishop of the Roman Catholic Archdiocese of Miami. The cathedral is named for Mary, mother of Jesus, and is located at 7525 N.W. 2nd Avenue, Miami, Florida in the United States. Since June 2010, Archbishop Thomas Gerard Wenski has served as the archbishop of Miami, Reverend Steven O’Hala is the cathedral's rector.

The first St. Mary's Church was a small wooden structure that was dedicated in 1930. The parish in 1936 moved the church to a new property and expanded it. The second St. Mary's Church was dedicated in 1939. When the Diocese of Miami was erected in 1958, the Vatican designated the existing St. Mary's Church as the Cathedral of St. Mary. Pope John Paul II visited the cathedral in 1987 and it underwent a major renovation in 2015 to replace the roof and make other improvements.

== History ==
=== 1929 to 1958 ===
During the first part of the 20th century, all the Catholic parishes in Florida were under the jurisdiction of the Diocese of St. Augustine in Northern Florida. In August 1929, 14 men and women, calling themselves the Little River Mission Club, met in a store in the Little River section of Miami to plan the formation of a new parish. Bishop Patrick Barry had told them that they would need 100 Catholic families for a parish.

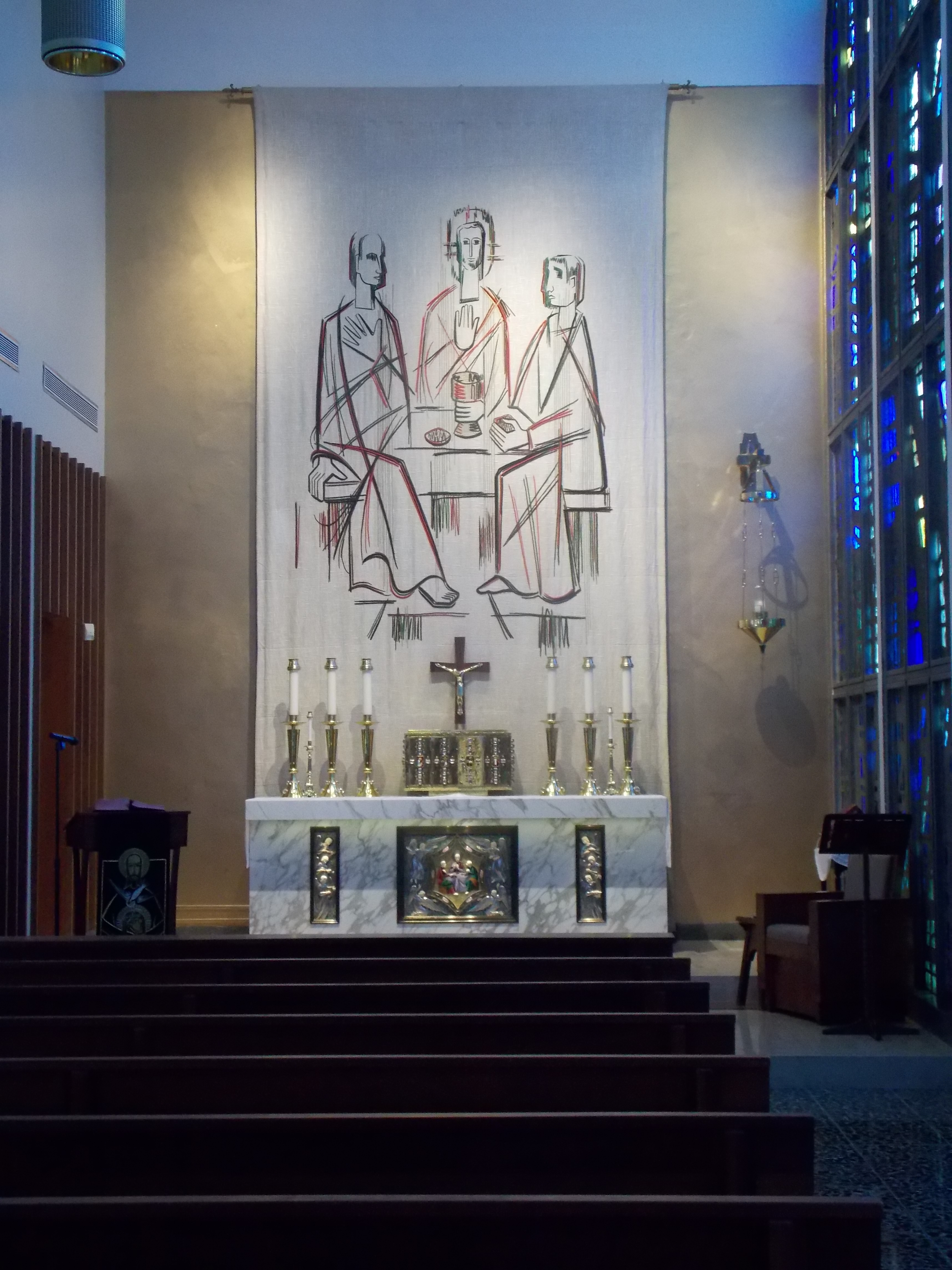
Blessed Sacrament Chapel, Cathedral of Saint Mary (2015)

The Club purchased three lots were purchased on Northwest 2nd Avenue and Northwest 75th Street for the construction of a new wooden church. The groundbreaking was in April 1930 and St. Mary's Church was dedicated on July 20, 1930. Reverend William Wilkinson of Gesu Parish in Miami celebrated the mass.

In October 1930, Reverend Patrick Joseph Roche was appointed the first pastor of St. Mary's Parish. The parish build a rectory on the church In 1931 and a parish hall was in 1935. In 1936, wanting to expand the church, the parish bought a property on Northwest 2nd Ave. and 75th Street. They moved the church to the new property, enlarged it and added two wings, increasing the seating capacity to 600 worshippers. Barry rededicated St. Mary's Church in February 1937.

The St. Mary's Parish School opened in 1939 with an enrollment of 230 students. It was staffed by eight teachers with the Sisters of St. Joseph from St. Augustine. In 1953, the new pastor, Reverend Patrick J. started planning a new church. The groundbreaking was held in 1955. On January 27, 1957, Cardinal Edward Mooney of Detroit dedicated the second St. Mary's Church.

=== 1958 to present ===
On August 13, 1958, Pope Pius XII erected the Diocese of Miami, with jurisdiction over South Florida. Bishop Coleman F. Carroll was appointed the first bishop of the new diocese. The Vatican designated St. Mary's Church to now serve as the Cathedral of Saint Mary. In 1960, a two-ton bronze bell and a pipe organ were installed in the cathedral. After the Cuban Revolution ended in 1958, many Cuban families in the early 1960's moved from Cuba to Miami. The St. Mary School experienced an influx of students. In 1966, Monsignor David Bushey, the rector, completed work on a rectory. A parish hall was built in 1967.

Recognizing the explosive growth of the Catholic population in South Florida, the Vatican on June 13, 1968, elevated the Diocese of Miami to the Archdiocese of Miami, with Bishop Coleman Carroll becoming its first the first archbishop.

Final funeral services for the comedian Jackie Gleason were held at the Cathedral of Saint Mary in June 1987. In September 1987, during a papal visit to Florida, Pope John Paul II stopped at the cathedral to greet Archbishop Edward A. McCarthy and local officials. Cardinal Jaime Ortega of the Archdiocese of Havana visited the cathedral in May 1995, drawing huge crowds.

In 2001, the archdiocese added a new ambo and altar to the cathedral, along with a Chapel of the Eucharist. The archdiocese in 2015 began major renovations on the cathedral. The most serious problem was the leaking roof, which was completely replaced. The contractors also painted the exterior walls, installed LED lights inside and outside, re-stained the mahogany front doors and updated the sound system. The project cost was $500,000.

== Design ==
The Cathedral of Saint Mary is a reinforced concrete building with steel rigid frames as supports. It features a concrete dome that reaches seven stories above the altar. The dome was originally covered in lead, which was later replaced with colored-glazed tiles the same as the roof. A southwest corner tower is 12 stories tall, topped with a second glazed-tile dome. The two mahogany doors at the entrance are 30 feet (9.1 m) high in a cut keystone frame. The brass hinges display a pattern of brass bolts and plates.

In the interior, the ceiling over the altar is 76 feet (23 m) high. The nave is 140 feet (43 m) long, 82 feet (25 m) wide, and five stories high. Five arches inside the nave support the roof. The nave has a 7 feet (2.1 m) foot main aisle and two 5-foot (1.5 m) side aisle altars.The nave floor is terrazzo.

== Leadership ==
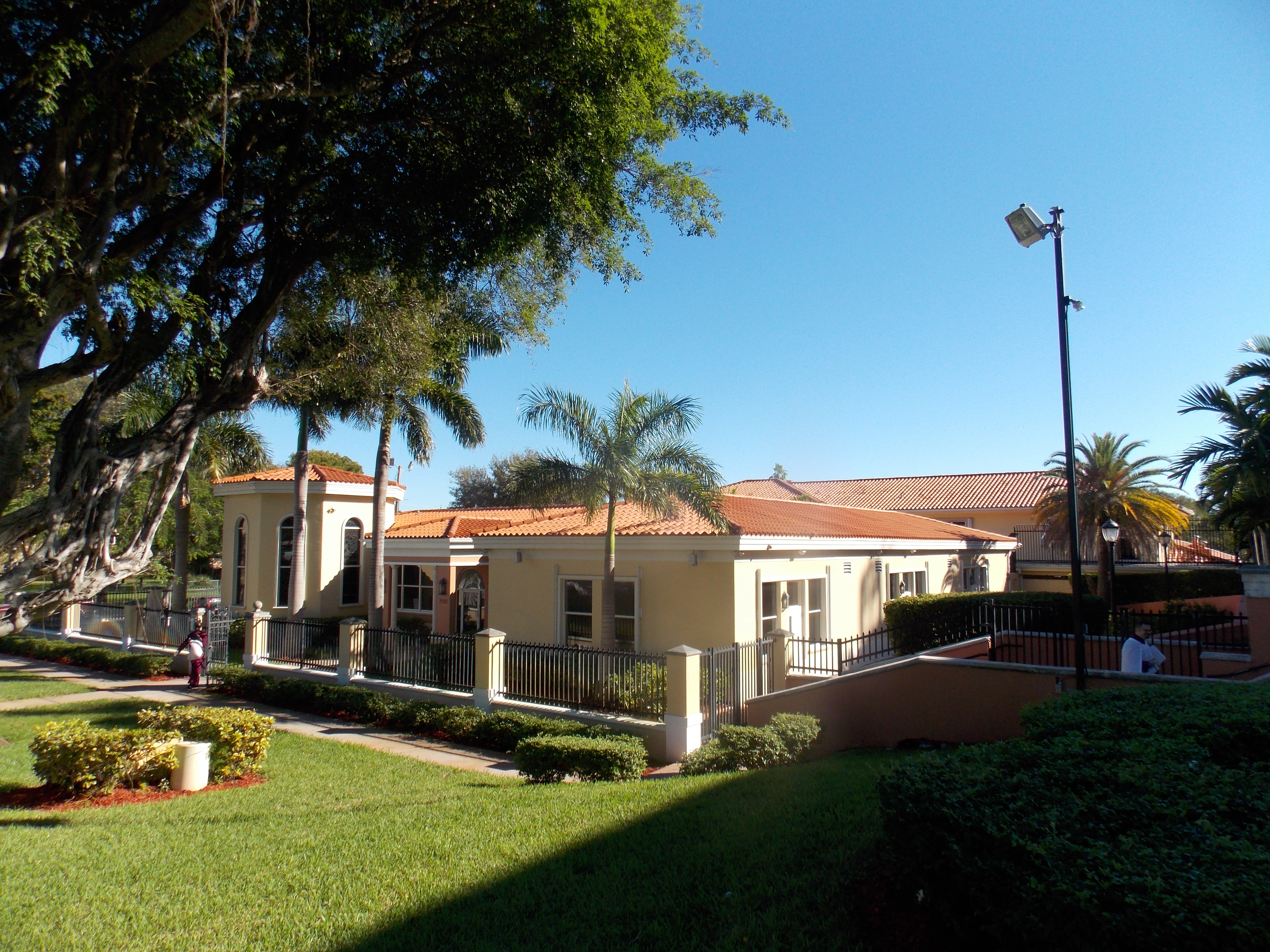
Parish offices and rectory, Cathedral of Saint Mary (2015)

=== Archbishops ===
- Archbishop Coleman Francis Carroll, D.D. (1958 – 1977)
- Archbishop Edward Anthony McCarthy, D.D. (1977 – 1994)
- Archbishop John Clement Favalora, D.D. (1994 – 2010)
- Archbishop Thomas Gerard Wenski, D.D. (2010 – present)

=== Pastors and rectors ===
- Monsignor Patrick J. Roche (1930 – 1953)
- Monsignor Patrick J. O’Donoghue (1953 – 1966)
- Monsignor David E. Bushey (1966 – 1970)
- Monsignor John J. Donnelly (1971 – 1980)
- Monsignor Gerald T. LaCerra (1980 – 1991)
- Monsignor Andrew A. Anderson (1991 – 1999)
- Monsignor Terence E. Hogan (1999 – 2012)
- Very Reverend Christopher Marino, V.F. (2012 – 2024)
- Very Reverend Steven O'Hala, V.F. (2024 – present)

== See also ==
- List of Catholic cathedrals in the United States
- List of cathedrals in Florida
- Saint Mary's Cathedral School (Miami, Florida)
