= Catholic Health Services =

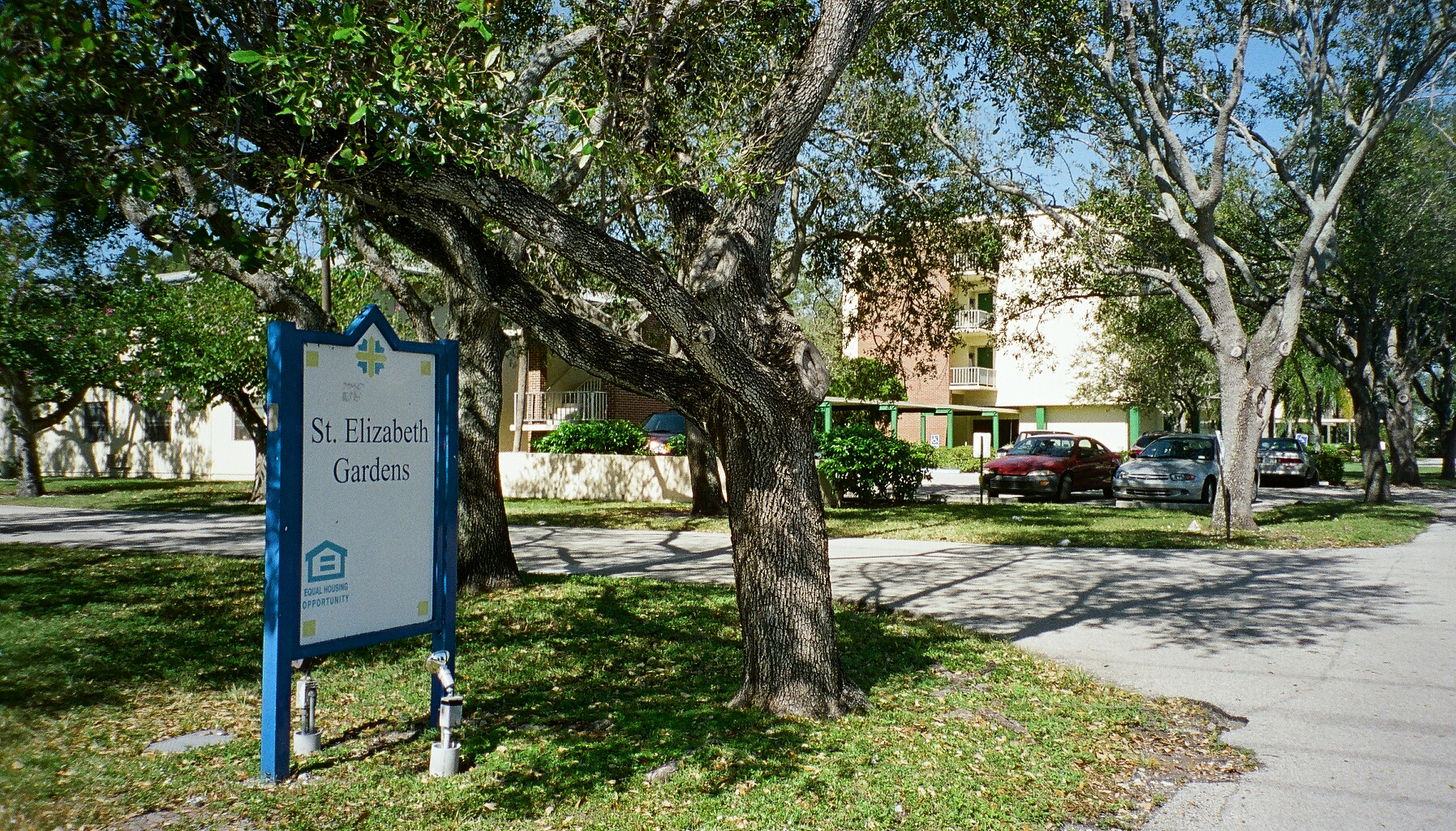
St. Elizabeth Gardens at St. Elizabeth of Hungary School in Pompano Beach is one of three homes for the aged operated by Catholic Health Services.

Catholic Health Services is a ministry of the Roman Catholic Archdiocese of Miami, and the largest post acute provider in the southeast United States.

It originated as Catholic Community Services, and as a result of the work Monsignor Bryan O. Walsh, later became Catholic Health and Rehabilitation Services.

The service operates 26 facilities in Broward and Miami-Dade Counties. According to the 2007 Archdiocese of Miami Official Catholic Directory, the two Catholic hospitals, Mercy Hospital in Miami and Holy Cross Hospital in Ft. Lauderdale, served 1,278,516 people; three CHS health care centers served 7,896; three homes for the aged assisted 2,578 senior citizens; two residential care centers for children served 376; seven day-care centers served 1,885; two specialized homes assisted 383; twelve special centers for social services served 81,320; and eleven other institutions served 1,432 people in 2007. Catholic Hospice Care is a partnership between the Archdiocese of Miami and Mercy Hospital. It provides end of life care to terminally ill patients and their families throughout Miami-Dade and Monroe counties. Catholic Health Services also operates two Catholic cemeteries, Our Lady Queen of Heaven in Broward County and Our Lady of Mercy in Miami-Dade.
