= Vicente Dopico Lerner =

Cuban artist (1943–2020)

- Born: April 22, 1943; Havana, Cuba
- Died: October 15, 2020 (aged 77); Miami, Florida

Vicente Dopico Lerner (April 22, 1943 – October 15, 2020) was a Cuban painter. Dopico Lerner also wrote on Latin American art and was the director of the Cuban Museum of Art and Culture in Miami.

== Education ==
Lerner received a B.A and a M.A. in fine arts from St. Thomas University in Miami and studied visual arts, watercolor, drawing, painting and design at the Art Students League of New York in Manhattan.

== Exhibitions ==
=== Solo exhibitions ===
His artistic works had been exhibited in Galería Arawak in Santo Domingo, Dominican Republic in 1994. In 1995 in Viva Galería in New York City. In 1997 he had an exhibition in the Museo de Arte Moderno, Santo Domingo, Dominican Republic and in 2001 in Havana, Cuba he showed at the Convento de San Francisco de Asís.

=== Collective exhibitions ===
He participated in an exhibition at the Cuban Museum Art and Culture in Miami, Florida in 1977. He was also involved in an exhibition displayed in the Society of Fine Arts in Tallahassee, Florida in 1987. In 1993, at the Watercolor Art Council, New Orleans, Louisiana. Three years later, he showed his works in the Instituto de Cultura Puertoriqueña in San Juan, Puerto Rico.

== Awards ==
Dopico received the Cintas Foundation Fellowship, New York, in 1976 and three years later the Society of Fine Arts, St. Petersburg, Florida.
