= St. Vincent de Paul Regional Seminary =

Coordinates: 26°31′2″N 80°7′32″W

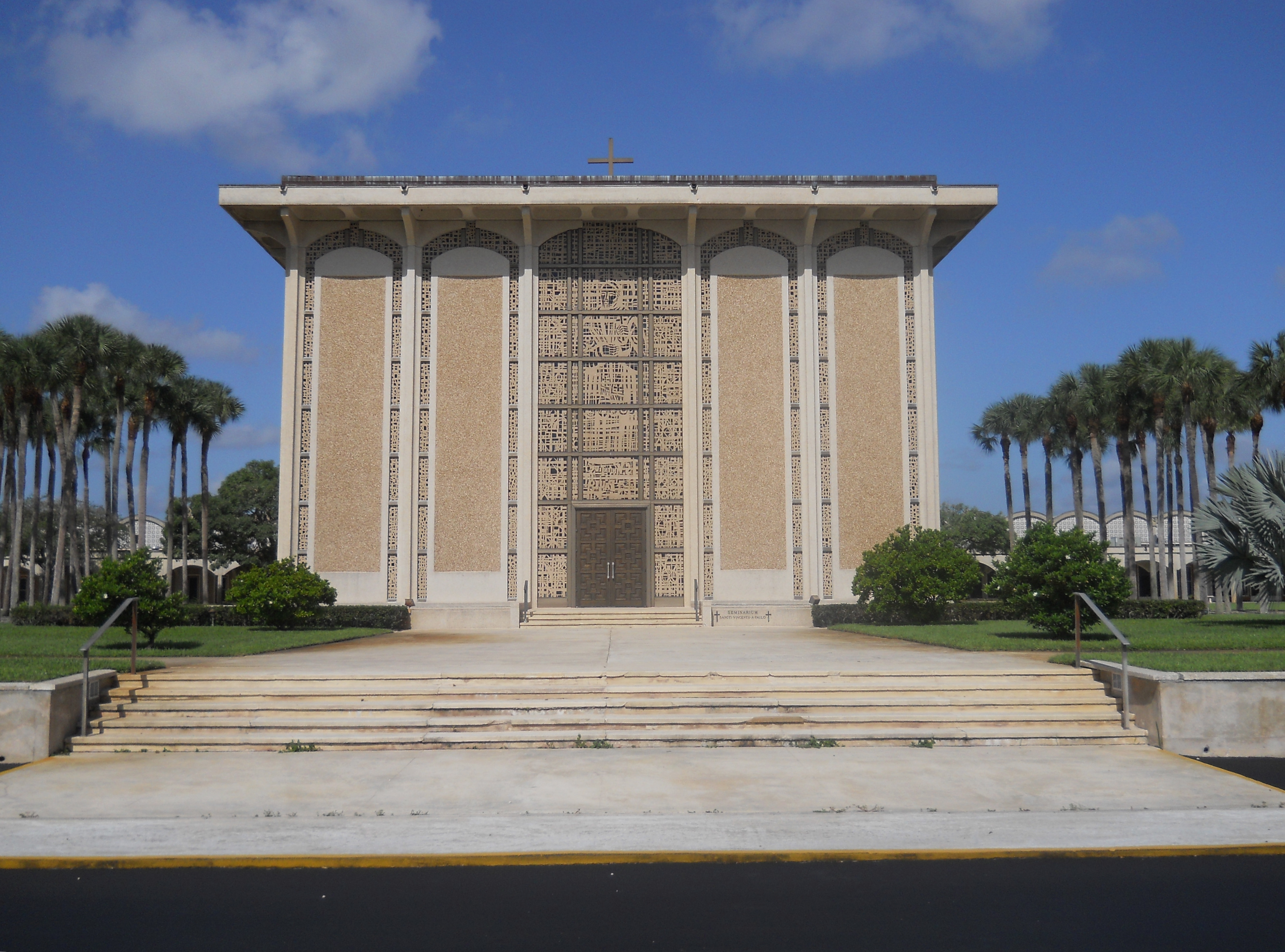
- The chapel, located in the center of the seminary grounds
- Established: 1963
- Location: Boynton Beach

St. Vincent de Paul Regional Seminary is a Roman Catholic seminary located in Boynton Beach, Florida for the education and formation of seminarians to the Roman Catholic priesthood.

St. Vincent de Paul Regional Seminary was established to form men for the diocesan and religious priesthood for the Catholic Church in North America, Central and South America, and the Caribbean. Laity are accepted into the program as well. It serves as the only Roman Catholic theologate in the Southeastern United States (located 1000 miles from the nearest seminary to the north, and 800 miles from the nearest seminary to the west), and serves as only one of two bilingual seminaries in the United States.

== History ==
Bishop Coleman F. Carroll, the first bishop of the Archdiocese of Miami, purchased 100 acres of land near Boynton Beach to build a new seminary. In 1963, he invited the Vincentian Fathers to operate the seminary in 1963. The Vincentian Fathers withdrew from St. Vincent on July 1, 1971, and the archdiocese took over the facility. Over time, the seven Florida dioceses joined the corporation that owns St. Vincent, sending their seminarian candidates there for priestly formation. In 2013, St. Vincent constructed two new residence halls and renovated its other facilities.

In the 2018–2019, academic year, 110 seminarians were enrolled for the fall semester at St. Vincent, a record number. As of 2015, there are over 460 alumni from St. Vincent, many of them serving in Florida.

== Master of Divinity program ==
In accordance with the Program of Priestly Formation established by the United States Conference of Catholic Bishops, St. Vincent seeks to prepare young men for the priesthood according to four pillars of formation: human, spiritual, academic, and pastoral. All seminarians are expected to be able to preach competently in their pastoral language before graduation, as well as celebrate the eucharist and two other sacraments. They should also be able to participate in bilingual liturgies and events, stressing Spanish and English.

Seminarians who meet the program requirements and receive approval from the formation team and their bishop will earn a Master of Divinity degree. The time table for matriculation is usually five years.

== Notable alumni ==
- Felipe J. Estévez, bishop emeritus of the Diocese of St. Augustine
- Martin Holley, bishop of the Diocese of Memphis
- Daniel T. K. Hurley, judge (United States District Court for the Southern District of Florida)
- John G. Noonan, bishop of the Diocese of Orlando
- Thomas G. Wenski, Archbishop of the Archdiocese of Miami
