= Archdiocese of Miami =

Roman Catholic archdiocese at Miami, Florida, United States

Coordinates: 25.851731°N 80.200796°W

Archdiocese of Miami Archidioecesis Miamiensis Arquidiócesis de Miami Achidyosèz Miami
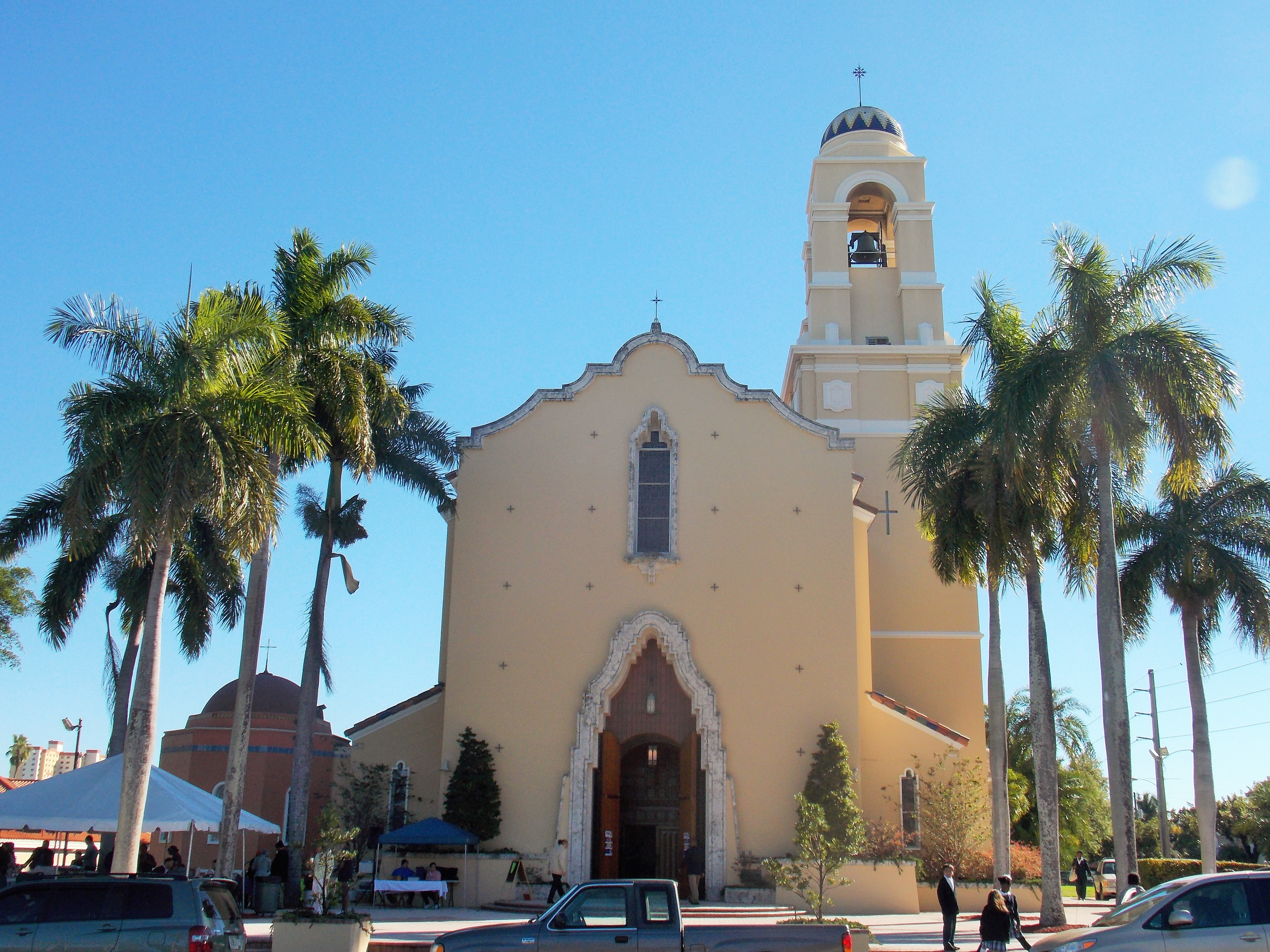
- Cathedral of Saint Mary

- Coat of arms

Location
- Country: United States
- Territory: Miami-Dade, Broward and Monroe counties in the state of Florida
- Ecclesiastical province: Province of Miami

Statistics
- Population: Total; Catholics: (as of 2018); 4,752,179; 1,300,000 (27%)
- Parishes: 109
- Schools: 62

Information
- Denomination: Catholic
- Sui iuris church: Latin Church
- Rite: Roman Rite
- Established: October 7, 1958; 68 years ago
- Cathedral: Cathedral of Saint Mary
- Patron saint: Our Lady of the Immaculate Conception

Current leadership
- Pope: Leo XIV
- Archbishop: Thomas Wenski
- Auxiliary Bishops: Enrique Esteban Delgado
- Judicial Vicar: Father Emmanuel Essiet
- Bishops emeritus: John Favalora

Map
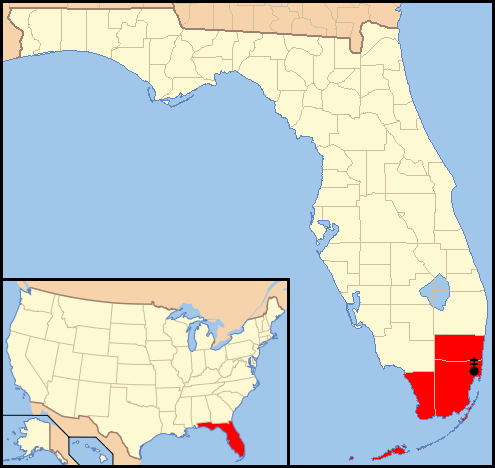

Website
- miamiarch.org

The Archdiocese of Miami (Latin: Archidioecesis Miamiensis, Spanish: Arquidiócesis de Miami, Haitian Creole: Achidyosèz Miami) is an archdiocese of the Catholic Church in South Florida in the United States. Formed in 1958, it is the metropolitan see for the Ecclesiastical Province of Miami, which covers all of Florida.

The Archdiocese of Miami contains the Florida counties Broward, Miami-Dade and Monroe. The Cathedral of Saint Mary is the mother church of the archdiocese. As of 2026, the archbishop is Thomas Wenski.

== Structure ==
Priests in the archdiocese celebrate mass in at least a dozen languages. The archdiocese operates two schools for the disabled, sixty elementary/middle schools, thirteen high schools, two universities, and two seminaries. The archdiocese operates radio, print, and television media outlets.

== History ==
=== Background ===
==== 1550 to 1850 ====
The first Catholics in Eastern Florida were a group of Spanish Jesuits who founded a mission in 1566 on Upper Matecumbe Key in the Florida Keys. After several years of disease and turbulent relations with the Native American inhabitants, the missionaries returned to Spain.

By 1606, the few Catholics in Florida was under the jurisdiction of the Diocese of Santiago de Cuba (until 1787, later under the Diocese of Havana in Cuba). After the end of the French and Indian War in 1763, Spain ceded all of Florida to Great Britain for the return of Cuba. Given the antagonism of Protestant Great Britain to Catholicism, the majority of the Catholic population in Florida fled to Cuba. After the American Revolution, Spain regained control of Florida in 1784. In 1793, the Vatican changed the jurisdiction for Florida Catholics from Havana to the Diocese of Louisiana and the Two Floridas, based in New Orleans, but in 1806 returned to Havana (until 1823). In the Adams–Onís Treaty of 1819, Spain ceded all of Florida to the United States, which established the Florida Territory in 1821.

In 1825, Pope Leo XII erected the Vicariate of Alabama and Florida, which included all of Florida, based in Mobile, Alabama.

=== 1850 to 1900 ===
In 1858, Pius IX moved Florida into a new Apostolic Vicariate of Florida and named Bishop Augustin Verot as vicar apostolic. In 1870, Pius IX elevated the Vicariate of Florida into the Diocese of St. Augustine and named Vérot as its first bishop. The new diocese covered all of Florida except for the Florida Panhandle region.

In 1850, Bishop Francis X. Gartland of Savannah sent the priest John F. Kirby to Key West to tend to a growing Catholic community there. He founded Saint Mary Star of the Sea Church in Key West in 1852. Gesù Parish in Miami, founded in 1896, was the first parish in South Florida outside of the Florida Keys.

==== 1900 to 1958 ====
Fort Lauderdale received its first parish in 1913 with the establishment of Saint Anthony's. The first Catholic church in Homestead was Sacred Heart, built in 1917. In Hollywood, Florida, Little Flower was established as a mission in 1924. Saint Patrick's was the first parish in Miami Beach, erected in 1926. In Hialeah, the first parish was St. John the Apostle, erected in 1945

In the 1950s and early 1960s, Bishop Joseph Hurley of Saint Augustine purchased land throughout South Florida in anticipation of a future population boom. Dozens of Catholic churches, schools and cemeteries were later built on land purchased by Hurley.

In 1950, the diocese opened Mercy Hospital in Miami. It is today HCA Florida Mercy Hospital. The Sisters of Mercy established Holy Cross Hospital in Fort Lauderdale in 1955. Today, it is Holy Cross Health. Saint Mary Parish in 1957 dedicated their new church in Miami; a year later, it would be designated as the Cathedral of Saint Mary.

=== Diocese of Miami ===
Pope Pius XII erected the Diocese of Miami on October 7, 1958, naming Auxiliary Bishop Coleman Carroll from the Diocese of Pittsburgh as the first bishop of Miami. On its formation, the new diocese included the 16 southern counties in Florida, with a Catholic population of approximately 200,000.

The Cuban Revolution in 1959 triggered a wave of Cuban immigration to South Florida, increasing the Catholic population in the region. Carroll established the Catholic Welfare Bureau to assist these immigrants. St. Elizabeth of Hungary Church, the first in Pompano Beach, was dedicated in 1959. That same year, the first parish in Plantation, Saint Gregory the Great, was erected. Between 1960 and 1962, the Catholic Welfare Bureau ran a clandestine operation, Operation Pedro Pan, to bring 14,000 Cuban children to South Florida.

=== Archdiocese of Miami ===
==== 1968 to 1970 ====
On March 2, 1968, Pope Paul VI erected the Dioceses of St. Petersburg and Orlando, taking eight counties from the Diocese of Miami. At the same time, the pope elevated the Diocese of Miami to the Archdiocese of Miami, naming Carroll as archbishop.

During the American Civil Rights Movement of the 60's, Carroll was influential in stemming threatened racial riots in Miami. He desegregated the Catholic schools in the archdiocese ten years before any other diocese in Florida. Carroll was a co-founder of the Community Relations Board, which worked to "quell waves of misunderstanding, discrimination and discontent which often threatened to flood South Florida's multi-ethnic community." Saint Andrew Parish, the first in Coral Springs, was erected in 1969.

=== 1970 to 2000 ===
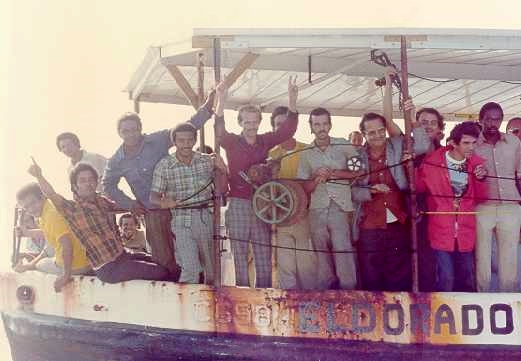
Cuban refugees arriving in Florida during the 1980 Mariel boat lift (1980)

After Carroll died 1977, Paul VI named Bishop Edward McCarthy as Miami's archbishop. McCarthy oversaw the construction in Miami Shores of the Pastoral Center - Florida Catholic for the archdiocese and restructured most senior operational divisions. He established the Office of Lay Ecclesial Ministry, the Office of Evangelization and the permanent diaconate program.

In 1980, McCarthy offered support and assistance to Cuban refugees during the Mariel Boat Lift. The following year, he supported the rights of Haitian immigrants who were detained by the US Immigration Service under the Wet Foot, Dry Foot policy. Responding to the needs of this new immigration, McCarthy opened the Pierre Toussaint Haitian Catholic Center in Miami. McCarthy retired in 1994.

On November 3, 1994, Pope John Paul II appointed Bishop John C. Favalora of St. Petersburg as the third archbishop of Miami. During his tenure, Favalora built two new high schools and nine grade schools.

==== 2000 to present ====
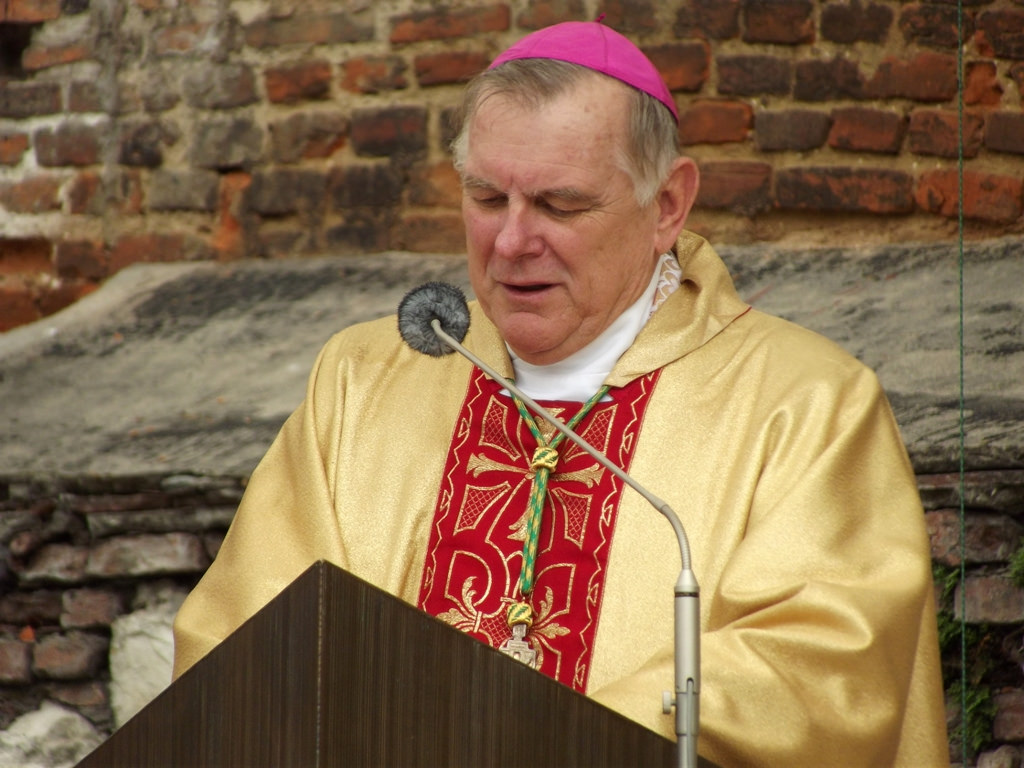
Archbishop Wenski (2014)

Favalora initiated Vision 2000, a five-year fundraising campaign to support Catholic education and outreach institutions in the archdiocese. Vision 2000 raised $90 million. On July 11, 2003, John Paul II appointed Auxiliary Bishop Thomas Wenski of Miami to lead the Diocese of Orlando. With substantial immigration of predominantly Catholic South and Central Americans to the South Florida area, the Catholic population reached 25% of the total population of South Florida. Waves of immigrants from other parts of the world, including Asia and Africa, led to priests celebrating mass in over a dozen different languages.

In 2009, the Vatican named Fernando Isern as the next bishop of the Diocese of Pueblo. He was the 11th archdiocesan priest to become a bishop since 1958.

On April 20, 2010, Pope Benedict XVI accepted Favarola's resignation and appointed Bishop Thomas Wenski of Orlando as his successor. On June 1, 2010, Wenski was installed as the fourth archbishop of Miami at the Cathedral of Saint Mary.

Wenski in February 2023 offered residences for priests and seminarians who had been expelled from Nicaragua by its government. The archdiocese in August 2025 celebrated its first mass at Alligator Alcatraz, the immigration detention facility built by the State of Florida in the Everglades.

On November 19, 2026, pastoral care of the Cayman Islands was transferred from the Archdiocese of Detroit to the Archdiocese of Miami.

== Bishops ==
=== Bishop of Miami ===
1. Coleman Carroll (1958–1968); elevated to Archbishop

=== Archbishops of Miami ===
1. Coleman Carroll (1968–1977)
2. Edward Anthony McCarthy (1977–1994)
3. John Favalora (1994–2010)
4. Thomas Wenski (2010–present)

=== Auxiliary bishops ===
- René Gracida (1968–1975), appointed Bishop of Pensacola-Tallahassee and later Bishop of Corpus Christi
- John Nevins (1979–1984), appointed Bishop of Venice
- Agustin Roman (1979–2013)
- Norbert Dorsey (1986–1990), appointed Bishop of Orlando
- Gilberto Fernandez (1997–2002)
- Thomas Wenski (1997–2003), appointed Coadjutor Bishop and later Bishop of Orlando and Archbishop of Miami
- Felipe Estévez (2004–2011), appointed Bishop of Saint Augustine
- John Noonan (2005–2010), appointed Bishop of Orlando
- John Fitzpatrick (1968–1971), appointed Bishop of Brownsville
- Peter Baldacchino (2014–2019), appointed Bishop of Las Cruces
- Enrique Esteban Delgado (2017–present)

=== Other priests of the diocese who became bishops ===
- Ambrose De Paoli, appointed Apostolic Nuncio and Titular Archbishop in 1983
- Fernando Isern, appointed Bishop of Pueblo in 2009
- Robert Nugent Lynch, appointed Bishop of Saint Petersburg in 1995

== Education ==
St. Theresa School, Coral Gables, Florida, (1925)

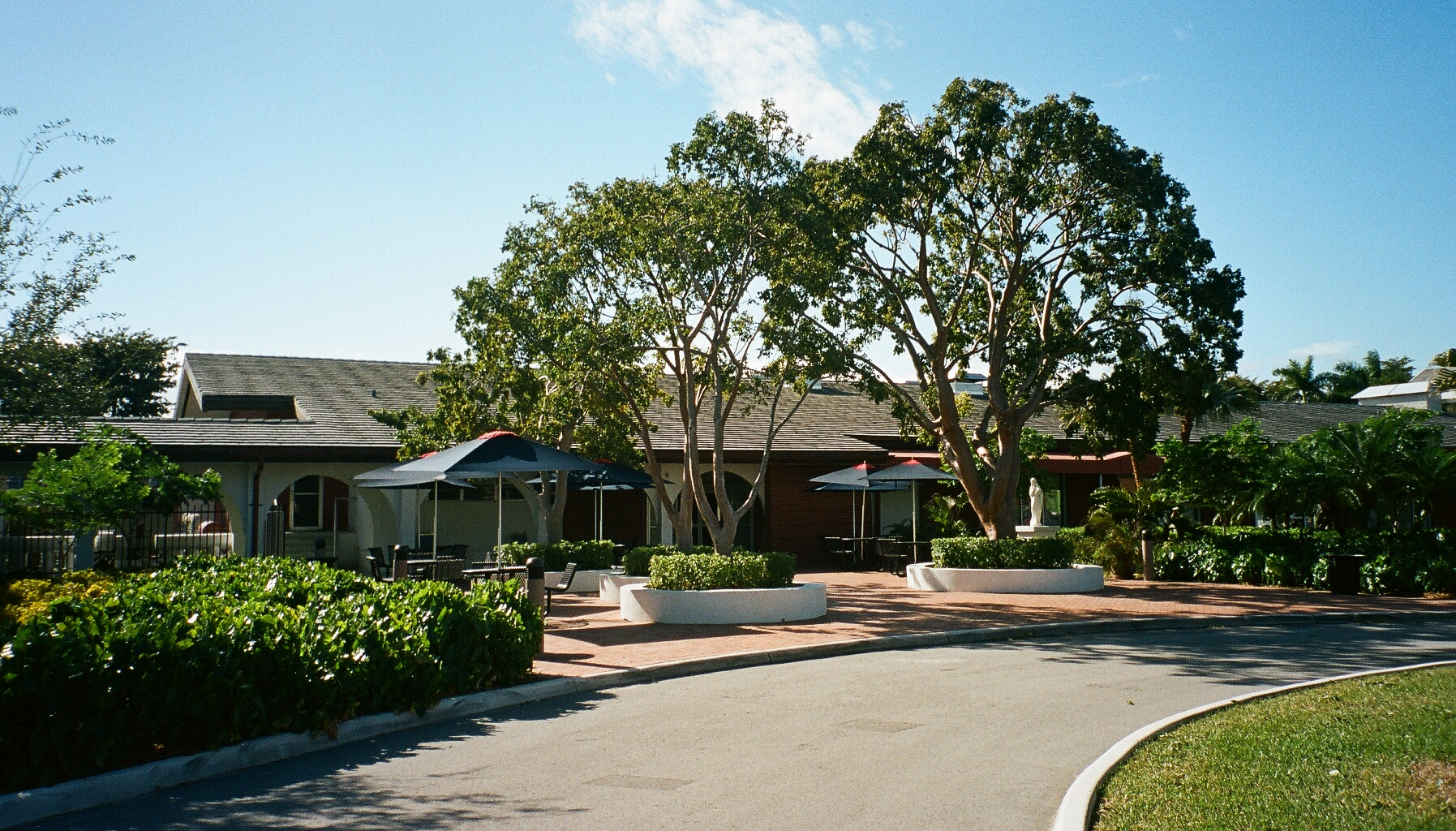
Christopher Columbus High School, Miami-Dade County (1958)

=== Schools ===
As of 2024, the Archdiocese of Miami had an enrollment of 35,000 students in 68 schools and four dedicated pre-schools.

High school	Opened	District	City
Archbishop Coleman F. Carroll High School	1998	The Hammocks	Unincorporated area
Archbishop Edward A. McCarthy High School	1998		Southwest Ranches
Belen Jesuit Preparatory School	1854	Tamiami	Miami
Cardinal Gibbons High School	1961		Fort Lauderdale
Carrollton School of the Sacred Heart	1961	Coconut Grove	Miami
Chaminade-Madonna College Preparatory School	1960		Hollywood
Christopher Columbus High School	1958	Westchester	Unincorporated area
Immaculata-LaSalle High School	1958	Coconut Grove	Miami
Monsignor Edward Pace High School	1961		Miami Gardens
Our Lady of Lourdes Academy	1963		Ponce-Davis
St. Brendan High School	1975	Westchester	Unincorporated area
St. Thomas Aquinas High School	1936		Fort Lauderdale

=== Religious education ===
The archdiocese offers religious education classes for children who attend public or private schools. In 1997, Favalora started requiring all volunteers, employees, teachers and priests working with children to be fingerprinted and undergo a background check.

=== Universities ===
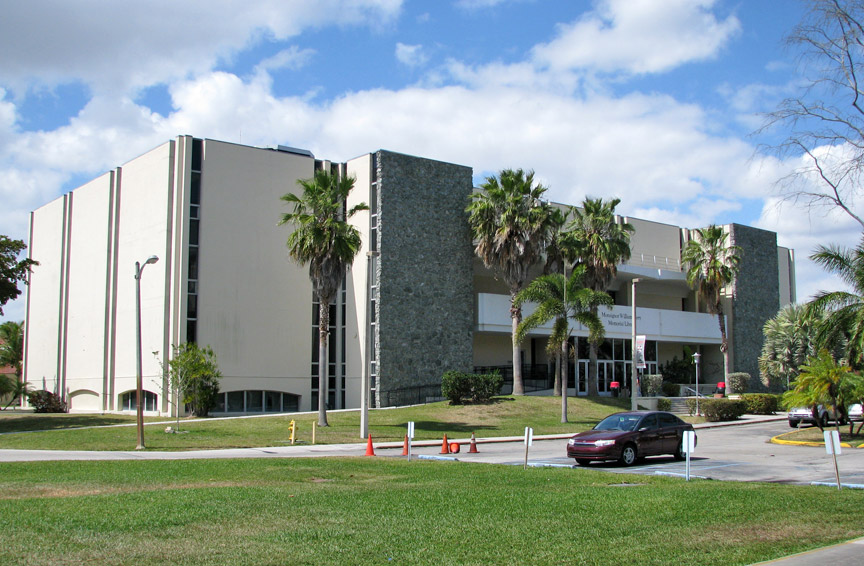
Barry University, Miami, Florida (2010)

==== St. Thomas University ====
The Archdiocese of Miami administers St. Thomas University in Miami. In 1961, a group of Augustinian priests arrived in Miami after being expelled from Cuba after the Cuban Revolution. They founded Biscayne College, which the archdiocese took over in 1988 and renamed as St. Thomas University.

==== Barry University ====
In 1940, the Dominican sisters, along with Bishop Patrick Berry of St. Augustine, founded Barry College for women in Miami Shores. It became Barry University in 1981

=== Seminaries ===
==== St. John Vianney ====
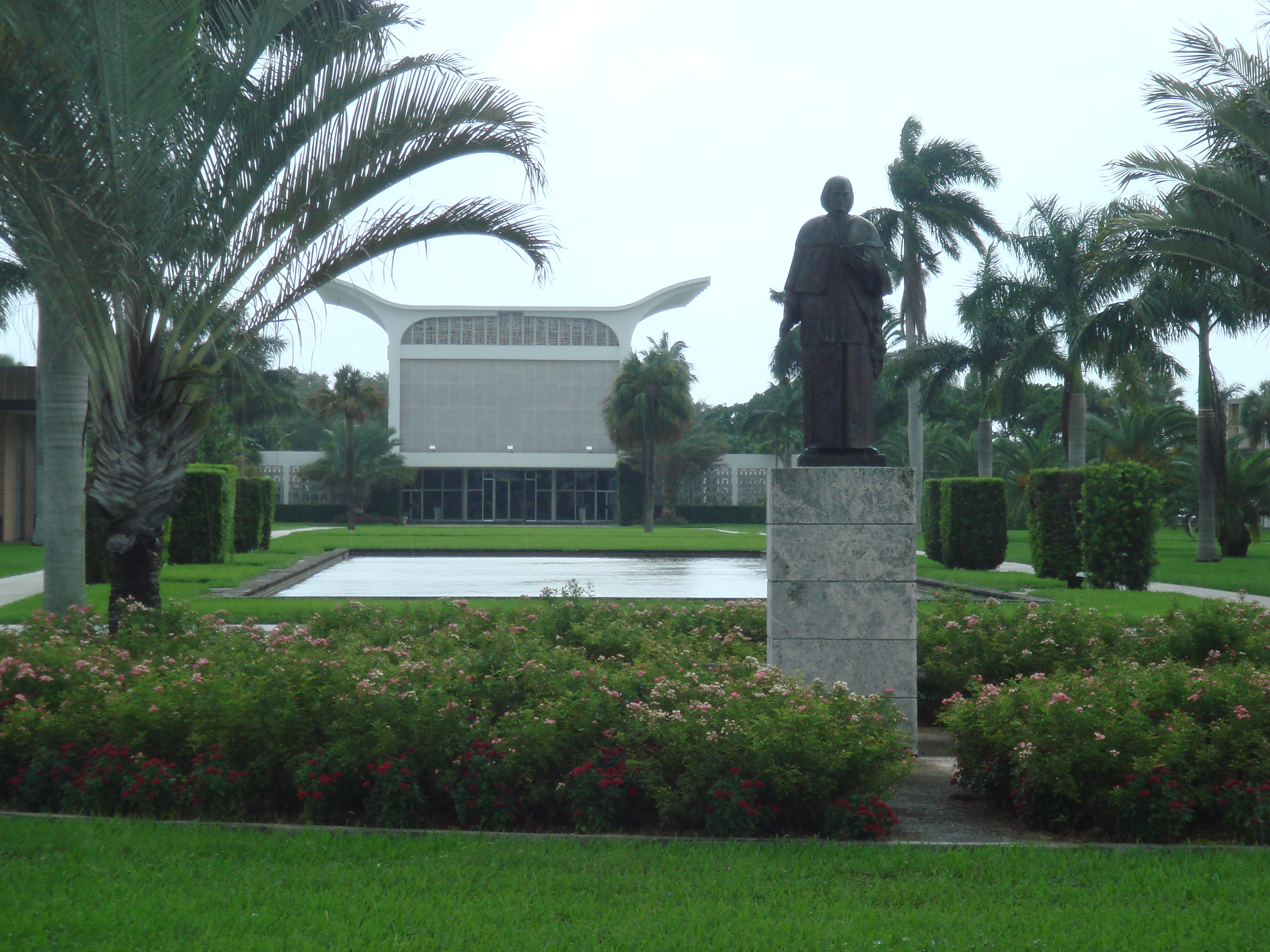
St. John Vianney College Seminary, Miami, Florida (2009)

St. John Vianney College Seminary and Graduate School in Miami is sponsored by the archdiocese. It offers a two-year pre-theology program for seminarians with a bachelor's degree. St. John Vianney also offers a Bachelor of Philosophy program for seminarians lacking a college degree. It also provides language immersion programs.

==== St. Vincent de Paul ====
St. Vincent de Paul Regional Seminary in Boynton Beach is sponsored by all the Florida dioceses.

==== Redemptoris Mater ====
Redemptoris Mater Archdiocesan Missionary Seminary in Hialeah is a diocesan seminary whose graduates are assigned by the archbishop to parish or missionary assignments. Its seminarians attend classes at St. John Vianney or St. Vincent de Paul.

== Catholic Charities of Miami ==
Providence Place, a shelter for women and children, Fort Lauderdale (2007)

Catholic Charities of Miami is a separate non-profit organization operated by the Archdiocese of Miami. It is part of a national network of Catholic Charities operated in each diocese. In 2007, Catholic Charities of Miami claimed to be the largest nongovernmental provider of services to the needy in South Florida.

Catholic Charities of Miami was founded in 1931 during the Great Depression with four Miami-area pastors and lay members of the Society of Saint Vincent de Paul.

== Health ==
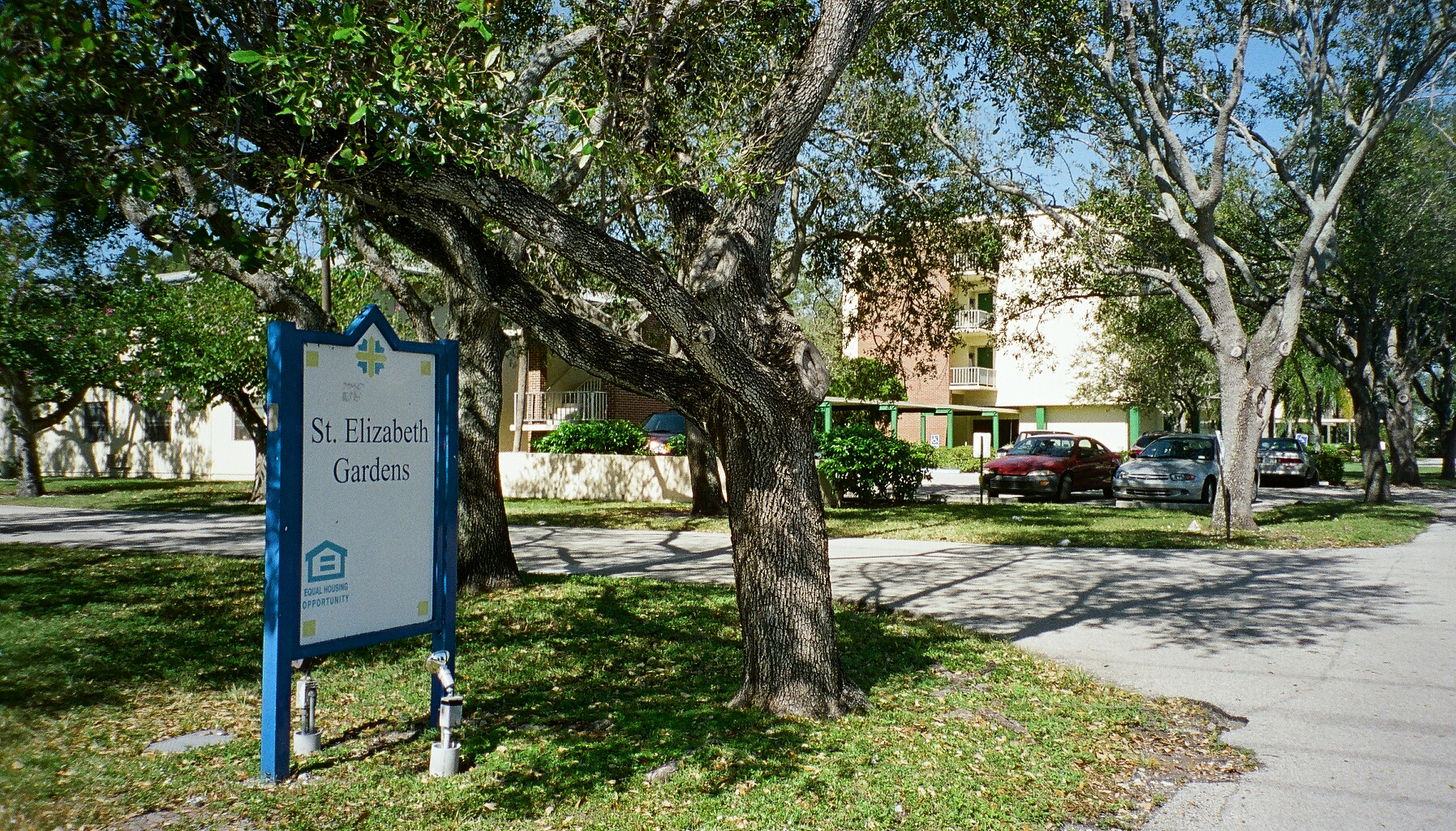
St. Elizabeth Gardens, Pompano Beach, a senior citizens home (2007)

Catholic Health Services operates 26 facilities in Broward and Miami-Dade Counties for the archdiocese. These included HCA Florida Mercy Hospital in Miami and Holy Cross Health in Ft. Lauderdale.

Catholic Hospice is a partnership between the archdiocese and Mercy Hospital. It provides end of life care to terminally ill patients and their families in Miami-Dade and Monroe counties.

== Catholic Cemeteries ==
Catholic Cemeteries operates two cemeteries:

- Our Lady of Mercy – Miami-Dade County
- Our Lady Queen of Heaven – Broward County

== Outreach ==
=== Lay movements and ministries ===
Lay men and women operate over 60 movements and ministries for the archdiocese. The archdiocese also helps support what it terms as crisis pregnancy centers, along with a post-abortion counseling program through Project Rachel, an anti-abortion initiative of the US Conference of Catholic Bishops.

=== Retreats ===
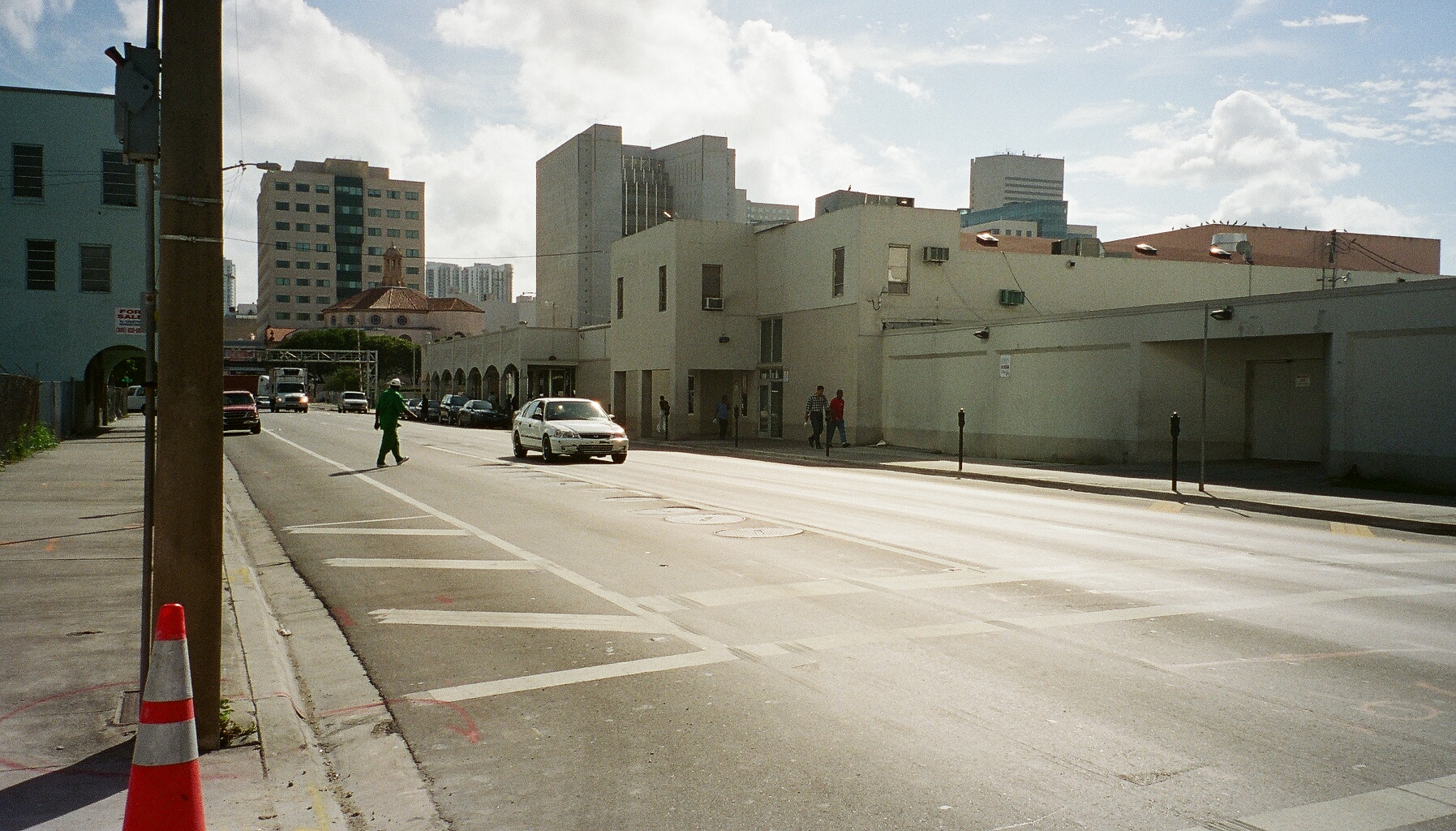
Camillus House (2007)

Morning Star Renewal Center in Pinecrest is a retreat house operated by lay people for the archdiocese. The center provides group retreats and offers spiritual formation activities.

=== Charities ===
- Camillus House, a homeless shelter
- HIV/AIDS shelter
- Missionaries of Charity of Mother Theresa
- Society of Saint Vincent de Paul
- Social advocacy groups

The archdiocese promotes support for South Florida charities through an annual "ABCD" - Archbishop's Charities and Development Drive - campaign.

== Media ==
=== PAX Catholic Communications ===
Radio Paz is a Spanish-language AM station founded in 1990. It is broadcast on WACC 830 AM.

=== Florida Catholic ===
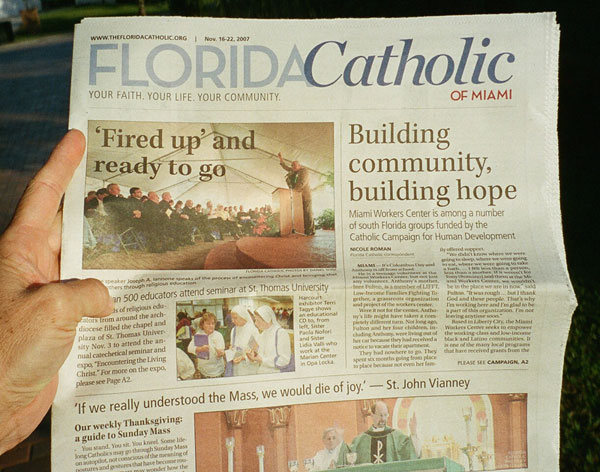
The Florida Catholic newspaper

The archdiocese publishes a localized version of the Florida Catholic newspaper every two weeks. Each issue contains a message from the archbishop, spiritual reflections on the scripture readings for the week, news reporting on various events happening around the archdiocese and the world, and a digest of upcoming events featured around the archdiocese among other features. Florida Catholic is also published online.

Florida Catholic produced a series entitled "Building the City of God", which profiles the personal side of priests. It won a Communicator Award of Distinction for print media "Marketing/Promotion/Campaign".

=== Content provision ===
The archdiocese produces English and Spanish masses to air on local television stations, along with content for the Internet and video.
