= St. Thomas University (Florida) =

Private Catholic university in Miami Gardens, Florida, U.S.

Coordinates: 25.9199°N 80.2559°W

- Former name: Biscayne College (1961–1984)
- Motto: "Leaders for Life"
- Type: Private university
- Established: 1961; 65 years ago
- Religious affiliation: Roman Catholic Archdiocese of Miami
- Academic affiliations: ACCU; NAICU; CIC; ICUF
- Endowment: $34.4 million (2022)
- President: Rafael Capó (interim)
- Students: 5,922
- Undergraduates: 1,797
- Postgraduates: 1,498
- Other students: 2,626
- Location: Miami Gardens, Florida, United States
- Colors: Burgundy & Dark Blue
- Nickname: Bobcats
- Sporting affiliations: NAIA – The Sun
- Website: stu.edu
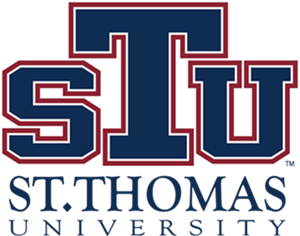

St. Thomas University (STU) is a private Catholic university in Miami Gardens, Florida, United States. The university offers 61 undergraduate and graduate degree programs, and post-graduate certificate programs on-campus and online. As of 2021, the university enrolled 5,922 students, which included 1,797 undergraduate students, 1,498 graduate students, 780 law students, 62 non-degree students, and 1,784 dual enrollment (high school) students.

The university is accredited by the Southern Association of Colleges and Schools Commission on Colleges.

== History ==
St. Thomas University's history can be traced back to 1946 Havana, Cuba, where it was founded by Augustinian friars from the United States as the Universidad Católica de Santo Tomás de Villanueva, named after Saint Thomas of Villanova. In 1961, Fidel Castro's militia confiscated the school's land and expelled the faculty and priests. In turn, the Augustinians fled to Miami and opened a new Catholic men's college – Biscayne College. In 1984, with the establishment of the School of Law and other graduate degree programs, the college, by then co-educational, again became St. Thomas University. The university came under the sponsorship of the Archdiocese of Miami in 1988, conferring upon St. Thomas the distinction of being the only Catholic Archdiocesan sponsored university in the state of Florida.

From 1970 until 1993, St. Thomas University was the training camp home of the Miami Dolphins NFL team. It was also the spring training home of the Baltimore Orioles.

The university was located in the Opa-locka North census-designated place, in an unincorporated area, until Miami Gardens incorporated as a city on May 13, 2003.

In 2019, St. Thomas University formally installed David A. Armstrong as the university's tenth president.

=== Presidents ===
President	Tenure
Edward J. McCarthy	1962-1968
Ralph V. Shuhler	1968-1969
John H. McDonnell	1969-1975
John J. Farrell	1975-1980
Patrick H. O'Neill	1980-1986
Pasquale di Pasquale	1987-1988
Richard E. Greene	1989-1993
Edward J. McCarthy	1993-1994
Franklyn M. Casale	1994-2018
David A. Armstrong	2018–2026

== Academics ==
St. Thomas University offers 23 undergraduate majors, 24 graduate majors, four doctoral programs, and one professional law program through its four colleges and schools:

- Benjamin L. Crump College of Law
- Biscayne College of Social and Human Sciences
- Gus Machado School of Business
- School of Science, Technology and Health

St. Thomas University is a member of the Florida Association of Colleges and Universities, the Independent Colleges & Universities of Florida, the National Association of Independent Colleges and Universities, and the Hispanic Association of Colleges and Universities.

=== Undergraduate admissions ===
In 2024, St. Thomas University accepted 65.1% of undergraduate applicants, was considered to have "Extremely Easy Admission Standards" with those enrolled having an average 3.24 high school GPA and with standardized test scores of an average 860-1060 SAT score, or an average 16-21 ACT score.

=== Rankings ===
Academic rankings

National
- U.S. News & World Report: 392-434

U.S. News & World Report ranked St. Thomas University in the No. 392-434 category out of 436 universities in the National Universities category in its 2025 Best Colleges ranking.

=== Study Abroad ===
Study abroad opportunities offer students study abroad experiences in Croatia, India, Israel, Italy, and Spain.

=== Student demographics ===
St. Thomas University demographics
Ethnic Enrollment, Fall 2018	Students
Hispanic	48.4%
Black	17.1%
White	16%
International	8%
Two or more races	3.4%
Asian	1.4%
American Indian/Alaska Native	0.4%
Hawaiian/Pacific Islander	0.1%
Unknown	5.3%

== Campus ==
The 150-acre (61 ha) campus is located in Miami Gardens, Florida. The University Library also contains the Archbishop John C. Favalora Archive and Museum. The museum opened in 2008.

=== Residential life ===
St. Thomas has six residence halls: Villanova Hall, Cascia Hall, Sullivan Hall, University Inn, Murphy Family Hall, and New Hall.

== Athletics ==
The St. Thomas athletic teams are called the Bobcats. The university is a member of the National Association of Intercollegiate Athletics (NAIA), primarily competing in the Sun Conference (formerly known as the Florida Sun Conference (FSC) until after spring 2008) since the 1990–91 academic year; while its men's wrestling team competes in the Appalachian Athletic Conference (AAC) and its eSports team competes in the Mid-South Conference (MSC). The Bobcats previously competed in the Sunshine State Conference (SSC) of the NCAA Division II ranks from 1975–76 to 1986–87.

St. Thomas competes in 28 intercollegiate varsity sports: Men's sports include baseball, basketball, cross country, football, golf, rugby, soccer, swimming & diving (2020), tennis, track & field and wrestling (2020); while women's sports include basketball, beach volleyball, bowling, cross country, flag football (2020), golf, lacrosse, rugby, soccer, softball, swimming & diving (2020), tennis, track & field and volleyball; and co-ed sports include cheerleading, competitive dance and eSports.

=== Honors ===
Last year, 12 of its 14 athletic teams received NAIA Scholar Team honors while five of the teams competed in national tournaments. Moreover, athletes annually maintain a 3.0 overall GPA. St. Thomas University prides itself on being "Champions of Character" and has annually been sighted as a Five Star Champions of Character Institution by the NAIA.

== Notable alumni ==
Notable alumni of the university include:

Name	Class year	Notability	References
Al Avila	1986	Professional baseball manager	
Jose Baez	2001 (Law School)	Attorney and author	
John T. Butler	1987	President of Boston College	
Miguel Díaz	1988	Ambassador	
Mike Fitzpatrick	1985	Politician	
David Gettleman	1986	Professional baseball manager	
Dom Irrera	1972	Actor and comedian	
Ana Navarro	1997 (Law School)	Attorney and political commentator	
Alex Penelas	1981	Politician	
Kiko Calero	1994–1996	Professional baseball player	
Vinnie Chulk	2001	Professional baseball player	
Nathan D.B. Connolly	1999	Historian and author	
Manny Díaz Jr.	1994	Politician	
Enrique Esteban Delgado	2015	Catholic bishop	
Andy Elisburg	1989	Professional basketball manager	
Michael Kelly	1994	College athletic director	
Laurent Lamothe	1999	Politician	
Paul Mainieri	1982	College baseball coach	
Pamela Silva Conde	2012	Journalist and television anchor	
Connie Sue Yori	1990	College basketball coach	
William Levy	1999–2000	Actor and model	
Kenny Anderson	2010	Professional basketball player	
Helen Lasichanh	1999–2002	Fashion designer and model	
Vicente Dopico Lerner	1974 & 1976	Painter	
Alejandra Gutierrez Oraa	2014	Journalist and television anchor	
Robin Harmony	2009	College basketball coach	
Shirley Gibson	1981 & 2003	Politician	
Francis Farberoff	1997	Professional Beach Soccer Player	
