= HCA Florida Mercy Hospital =

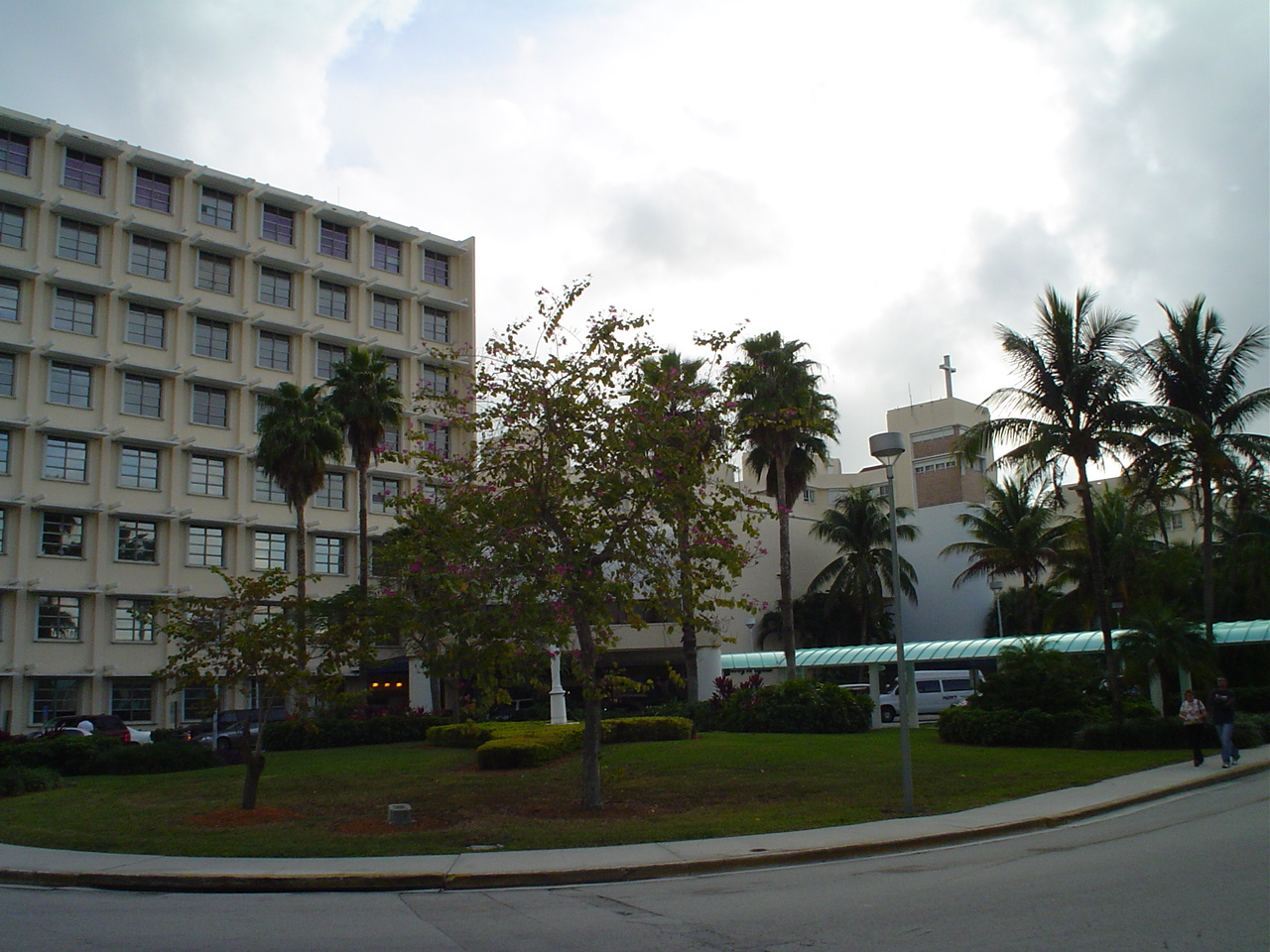
- Mercy Hospital in January 2008

Geography
- Location: Coconut Grove, Miami, Florida, United States
- Coordinates: 25°44′24.51″N 80°12′49.99″W

Organization
- Religious affiliation: Catholic

Services
- Beds: 488

History
- Former name: Mercy Hospital
- Opened: 1950

Links
- Website: www.hcafloridahealthcare.com/locations/mercy-hospital
- Lists: Hospitals in Florida

Mercy Hospital is a 488-bed acute care hospital located in Coconut Grove, Miami, Florida. It is Miami-Dade County's only Catholic hospital, it is sponsored by the Sisters of St. Joseph of St. Augustine, Florida.

== History ==
Mercy Hospital was established in 1950. On May 2, 2011, HCA took over the management of the hospital after purchasing it from Catholic Health East, and renamed it Mercy Hospital - A Campus of Plantation General Hospital.

In March 2022, the medical facility was rebranded to HCA Florida Mercy Hospital. In April 2023, the hospital opened a 10,000 square foot (930 m^{2}) emergency department near Dadeland Mall.

== Notable patients ==
- Paulina Rubio gave birth to her second son on March 5, 2016.
- Carlos Andrés Pérez
