= Saint John Vianney Seminary (Florida) =

Roman Catholic seminary in Westchester, Florida

Saint John Vianney College Seminary Miami
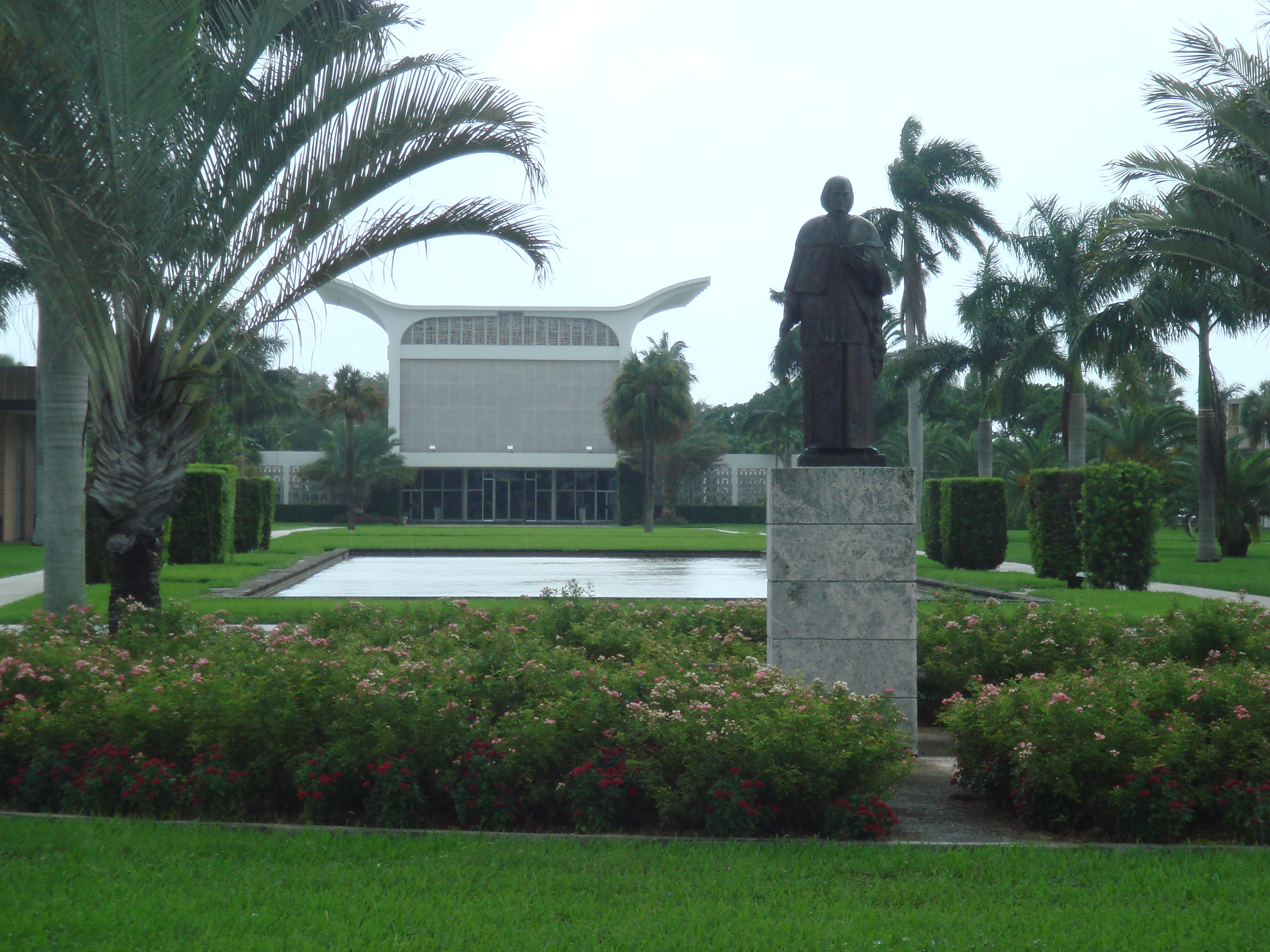
- Type: Private seminary
- Established: June 7, 1959; 67 years ago
- Religious affiliation: Roman Catholic (Roman Catholic Archdiocese of Miami)
- Rector: Pablo A. Navarro
- Students: 38 (Resident seminarians)
- Location: Westchester, Florida, United States; 25.7428784°N 80.3381077°W
- Website: sjvcs.edu

Saint John Vianney College Seminary is a Catholic seminary in Westchester, Florida, United States. It was founded in 1959 by Coleman Carroll, the first bishop of the Archdiocese of Miami. In 2014, there were 97 students enrolled.

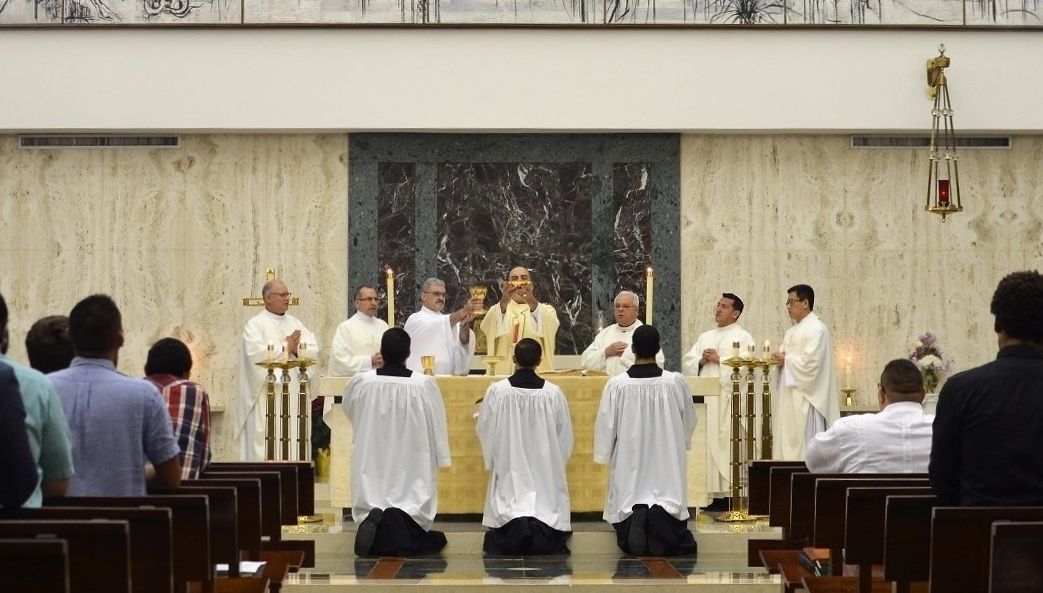
Community Mass

The Vincentian Fathers opened and ran the school, but in 1975 the Archdiocese of Miami assumed responsibility for the direction of the seminary. The seminary serves men of all the Catholic dioceses in the state of Florida, as well as other seminarians from various dioceses throughout the United States and the world. In accordance with the cultural makeup of South Florida, the seminary bills itself as bilingual, allowing seminarians the opportunity to pray and socialize in both Spanish and English.
