= Coleman Carroll =

American Catholic clergyman

The Most Reverend Coleman Francis Carroll
- Archbishop of Miami
- See: Miami
- Installed: October 7, 1958
- Term ended: July 26, 1977
- Successor: Edward A. McCarthy
- Other post: Auxiliary Bishop of Pittsburgh (1953–1958)

Orders
- Ordination: June 15, 1930
- Consecration: November 10, 1953

Personal details
- Born: February 9, 1905 Pittsburgh, Pennsylvania
- Died: July 26, 1977 (aged 72) Miami, Florida
- Denomination: Roman Catholic Church

Coleman Francis Carroll (February 9, 1905 – July 26, 1977) was an American clergyman of the Roman Catholic Church. He served as bishop (later archbishop) of Miami from 1958 until his death in 1977.

== Biography ==
Coleman Carroll was born in Pittsburgh, Pennsylvania, the second of three children of William and B. Margaret (née Hogan) Carroll. His parents were both born in Ireland, and his father, who worked as a railroad brakeman and clerk for Carnegie Steel Company, died in 1922. His two brothers also joined the priesthood; his older brother, Howard Joseph Carroll, served as Bishop of Altoona-Johnstown, and his younger brother, Walter Sharp Carroll, worked in the Vatican Secretariat of State. He attended Holy Rosary elementary and high schools in Homewood, and later graduated from Duquesne University in 1926. His theological studies were made at St. Vincent Seminary in Latrobe.

On June 15, 1930, Carroll was ordained a priest for the Diocese of Pittsburgh. He then served as a curate at the Church of the Resurrection in Brookline, St. Scholastica Church in Aspinwall, St. Basil Church in Carrick, and Holy Cross Church on the South Side. In 1944, he earned a Doctor of Canon Law degree from the Catholic University of America in Washington, D.C. He organized St. Maurice Church in Forest Hills in 1949, serving as its founding pastor. He became pastor at Sacred Heart Church in East Liberty in 1951, and was named diocesan vicar for religious in 1952. He was raised to the rank of domestic prelate in September 1952. He also headed the philosophy department at Duquesne University for four years, and taught at Mount Mercy College for ten years.

On August 25, 1953, Carroll was appointed Auxiliary Bishop of Pittsburgh and Titular Bishop of Pitanae by Pope Pius XII. He received his episcopal consecration on the following November 10 from Archbishop Amleto Giovanni Cicognani, with Bishops John Francis Dearden and Michael Joseph Ready serving as co-consecrators, at the Cathedral of St. Paul. His consecration was attended by over 2,000 people, including Pennsylvania's first Catholic governor, David L. Lawrence. As an auxiliary bishop, Carroll assisted Bishop Dearden with the administrative duties of the diocese, and continued to serve as pastor of Sacred Heart Church.

On August 13, 1958, Carroll was named the first bishop of the newly erected Diocese of Miami in Florida. His installation took place on the following October 7. At the time of his arrival, the diocese comprised sixteen counties in southern Florida with a Catholic population of 185,000. By the time of his death, the archdiocese was composed of eight counties, and included 700,000 Catholics, 127 parishes, 500 priests, and 750 nuns. A little over a year following his installation, Carroll founded St. John Vianney College Seminary in Miami. He later opened St. Vincent de Paul Seminary at Boynton Beach in 1963. He also established a weekly diocesan newspaper called The Voice.

In response to the Cuban exile, Carroll welcomed over half a million Cuban refugees into the diocese. In 1960, he used the four-story school building of Gesu Church to establish the Centro Hispano Catolico, a welfare agency that provided medical care, child care, legal aid, employment service, food, clothing and cash for Cuban refugees in the diocese. He also helped to coordinate Operation Peter Pan, and even scolded Monsignor Bryan O. Walsh, who headed the diocesan Catholic Charities program, for not agreeing to resettle more unaccompanied children. However, Carroll was accused by some Hispanic Catholics, including a number of priests, of showing little interest in their community. They also claimed he was trying to Anglicize the diocese by limiting Spanish-language education in parochial schools and Spanish-language Masses. Carroll did, however, maintain amicable relationships with local African American and Jewish leaders. He was a frequent visitor of Camillus House, established homes for the elderly and unwed mothers, and opened rehabilitation centers for drug addicts and alcoholics.

On August 5, 1968, Carroll offered the invocation at the opening of the 1968 Republican National Convention in Miami Beach.

Carroll was known for his firm control over his priests and parishioners, as well as for his outspoken conservative political views and progressive social outlook. He was a vocal opponent of a local ordinance in Dade County that prohibited discrimination on the basis of sexual orientation, supporting the Save Our Children campaign led by Anita Bryant. He was an advocate for racial justice and strongly supported the civil rights movement. On theological matters, he was described as a "hardline Roman Catholic traditionalist" known for his "vociferous opposition to liberalization of the church." He also opposed repealing the practice of abstaining from meat on Fridays.

When the Diocese of Miami was elevated to the rank of an archdiocese by Pope Paul VI on March 2, 1968, Carroll became its first Archbishop. The Dioceses of Orlando and of St. Petersburg were erected from the Archdiocese of Miami, with Carroll holding the status of a metropolitan bishop over them. Less than ten years later, Carroll took ill and Edward A. McCarthy was appointed Coadjutor Archbishop of Miami in 1976.

At age 72, Carroll died from complications stemming from a vascular disease at his residence in Miami Beach. He was buried three days later in the priests' section of Our Lady of Mercy Cemetery in Miami.

Catholic Church titles
Preceded by None	Archbishop of Miami; 1958–1977	Succeeded by Edward A. McCarthy
Preceded by –	Auxiliary Bishop of Pittsburgh; 1953–1958	Succeeded by –
