= John Favalora =

American prelate

His Excellency, The Most Reverend John Clement Favalora
- Archbishop Emeritus of Miami
- Church: Roman Catholic Church
- Archdiocese: Miami
- Appointed: November 3, 1994
- Installed: December 20, 1994
- Retired: April 20, 2010
- Predecessor: Edward Anthony McCarthy
- Successor: Thomas Gerard Wenski
- Previous posts: Bishop of St. Petersburg (1989-1994); Bishop of Alexandria (1986-1989)

Orders
- Ordination: December 20, 1961 by Martin John O’Connor
- Consecration: July 29, 1986 by Pio Laghi, Philip Hannan, and William Benedict Friend

Personal details
- Born: December 5, 1935 (age 90) New Orleans, Louisiana, US
- Motto: Deus providebit (God will provide)

Styles of John Clement Favalora
- Reference style: His Excellency; The Most Reverend
- Spoken style: Your Excellency
- Religious style: Archbishop

John Clement Favalora (born December 5, 1935) is an American prelate of the Catholic Church. He served as archbishop of the Archdiocese of Miami from 1994 to 2010, as bishop of the Diocese of Alexandria in Louisiana from 1986 to 1989 and as bishop of the Diocese of St. Petersburg in Florida from 1989 to 1994.

== Biography ==
=== Early life ===
Favalora was born on December 5, 1935, in New Orleans, Louisiana, where he graduated from Jesuit High School in 1954. He studied for the priesthood at St. Joseph Seminary in St. Benedict, Louisiana and Notre Dame Seminary in New Orleans. Favalora then went to Rome to attend the Pontifical Gregorian University and the Pontifical North American College in Rome, earning a Bachelor of Philosophy and History degree.

=== Priesthood ===
Favalora was ordained into the priesthood in Rome at St. Peter's Basilica by Archbishop Martin O’Connor for the Archdiocese of New Orleans on December 20, 1961. After returning to New Orleans, the archdiocese sent him to Xavier University in New Orleans to obtain certification as a secondary school teacher. He later attended the Catholic University of America in Washington, D.C., and obtained a Master of Education degree from Tulane University in New Orleans.

Favalora served as assistant pastor of St. Theresa of the Child Jesus Parish in Duson, Louisiana, from 1962 to 1970. In addition to his duties at St. Theresa, Favalora served as vice rector of St. John Vianney Preparatory School in New Orleans in 1964. In 1968, he was appointed principal. In 1973, Favalora began a six-year stint as pastor of St. Angela Merici Parish in Metairie, Louisiana. In 1979, he was named director of the Office of Vocations. Archbishop Philip M. Hannan named Favalora as rector/president of Notre Dame Seminary in 1981.

=== Bishop of Alexandria ===
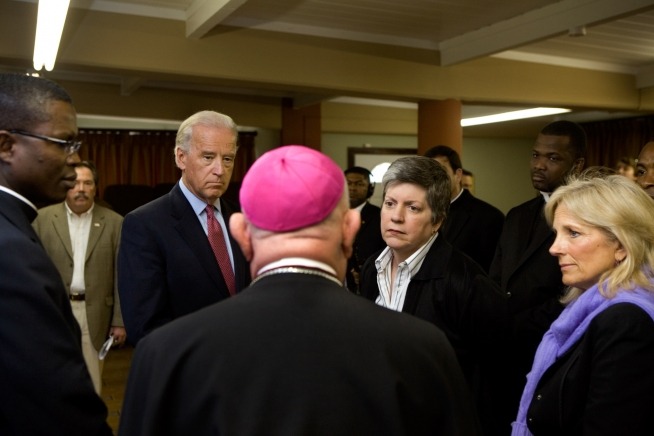
Favalora meeting in Little Haiti with Vice President Joe Biden, Secretary of Homeland Security Janet Napolitano and Second Lady Jill Biden (2010)

Pope John Paul II appointed Favalora as the ninth bishop of Alexandria on June 24, 1986. Favalora was consecrated on July 29, 1986, at St. Francis Xavier Cathedral in Alexandria. Archbishop Pio Laghi served as principal consecrator with Archbishop Philip Hannan and Bishop William Friend serving as principal co-consecrators.

=== Bishop of St. Petersburg ===
On March 14, 1989, Favalora was appointed by John Paul II as the third bishop of St. Petersburg. Favalora was installed on May 16, 1989.

=== Archbishop of Miami ===
On November 3, 1994, Favalora was appointed by John Paul II as the third archbishop of Miami. Favalora was installed on December 20, 1994, at the Cathedral of Saint Mary in Miami.

Favalora has served as a board member of The Catholic University of America in Washington, D.C., and St. Vincent de Paul Regional Seminary in Boynton Beach. He also served as state chaplain and a member of the Knights of Columbus in Florida, in addition to being president of the Florida Catholic Conference. Favalora has been a member of the USCCB committees on Priestly Life and Ministry, Sexual Abuse and Pro-Life issues.

Favalora adopted the USCCB charter for the Protection of Children and Young People after being deposed and settling cases during the sexual abuse scandal in the archdiocese.

=== Retirement ===
Pope Benedict XVI accepted Favarola's resignation as archbishop of Miami on April 20, 2010, eight months before he reached the mandatory retirement age of seventy-five.

== Episcopal lineage ==
- Cardinal Scipione Rebiba
- Cardinal Giulio Antonio Santorio (1566)
- Cardinal Girolamo Bernerio, OP (1586)
- Archbishop Galeazzo Sanvitale (1604)
- Cardinal Ludovico Ludovisi (1621)
- Cardinal Luigi Caetani (1622)
- Cardinal Ulderico Carpegna (1630)
- Cardinal Paluzzo Paluzzi Altieri degli Albertoni (1666)
- Pope Benedict XIII (1675)
- Pope Benedict XIV (1724)
- Pope Clement XIII (1743)
- Cardinal Marcantonio Colonna (1762)
- Cardinal Hyacinthe Sigismond Gerdil, CRSP (1777)
- Cardinal Giulio Maria della Somaglia (1788)
- Cardinal Carlo Odescalchi, SJ (1823)
- Cardinal Costantino Patrizi Naro (1828)
- Cardinal Lucido Parocchi (1871)
- Pope Pius X (1884)
- Cardinal Gaetano De Lai (1911)
- Cardinal Raffaele Rossi, OCD(1920)
- Cardinal Amleto Giovanni Cicognani (1933)
- Archbishop Pio Laghi (1969)
- Archbishop John Favalora (1986)

== Episcopal succession ==
Catholic Church titles
Preceded by Edward Anthony McCarthy	Archbishop of Miami; 1994–2010	Succeeded by Thomas Wenski
Preceded by William T. Larkin	Bishop of St. Petersburg; 1989–1994	Succeeded by Robert Nugent Lynch
Preceded by William Benedict Friend	Bishop of Alexandria in Louisiana; 1986–1989	Succeeded by Sam Gallip Jacobs

== See also ==
- Hierarchy of the Catholic Church
- Historical list of the Catholic bishops of the United States
- List of Catholic bishops in the United States
- List of Catholic bishops of the United States
- Lists of popes, patriarchs, primates, archbishops, and bishops
