= Edward A. McCarthy =

American prelate

His Excellency, The Most Reverend Edward Anthony McCarthy
- Archbishop of Miami
- Church: Roman Catholic Church
- See: Archdiocese of Miami
- In office: July 26, 1977, to November 3, 1994
- Predecessor: Coleman F. Carroll
- Successor: John C. Favalora
- Previous posts: Titular Bishop of Tamascani; Bishop of Phoenix

Orders
- Ordination: May 29, 1943 by John T. McNicholas
- Consecration: June 15, 1965 by Karl Joseph Alter

Personal details
- Born: April 10, 1918 Cincinnati, Ohio
- Died: June 7, 2005 (aged 87) Miami, Florida, US
- Education: Athenaeum of Ohio; Pontifical University of Saint Thomas Aquinas

Edward Anthony McCarthy (April 10, 1918 – June 7, 2005) was an American prelate of the Roman Catholic Church. He served as the second archbishop of the Archdiocese of Miami in Florida from 1977 to 1994. He previously served as bishop of the Diocese of Phoenix in Arizona from 1969 to 1977 and as an auxiliary bishop of the Archdiocese of Cincinnati in Ohio from 1965 to 1969.

McCarthy was appointed coadjutor archbishop of Miami on September 17, 1976, and succeeded Coleman Francis Carroll as archbishop of Miami on July 26, 1977. McCarthy retired as archbishop on November 3, 1994. He died on June 7, 2005, at the age of 87.

== Background ==
=== Early life ===
Edward McCarthy was born on April 10, 1918 in Cincinnati, Ohio. He graduated from Saint Gregory Seminary in Cincinnati and Mt. Saint Mary Seminary in Norwood, Ohio. His education included a Master of Arts degree in philosophy from the Athenaeum of Ohio in Cincinnati.

=== Priesthood ===
McCarthy was ordained a priest for the Archdiocese of Cincinnati by Archbishop John Timothy McNicholas on May 29, 1943. He earned a Doctor of Canon Law degree in 1947 and a Doctor of Sacred Theology degree in 1948 while in Rome, Italy at the Pontifical University of St. Thomas Aquinas. His dissertation was entitled Epiky: a theoretical study of the virtue of epiky and its use, along with a historical review of the development of the doctrine on this subject.

During his service within the Diocese of Cincinnati McCarthy served as the secretary to two archbishops, judge in the marriage tribunal and as chair of numerous diocesan committees.

=== Auxiliary Bishop of Cincinnati ===
McCarthy was appointed as an auxiliary bishop of Cincinnati by Pope Paul VI on April 21, 1965. He was consecrated at the Cathedral of St. Peter in Chains in Cincinnati on June 15, 1965, with Archbishop Karl Alter serving as principal consecrator.

=== Bishop of Phoenix ===
McCarthy was appointed the first bishop of the newly created Diocese of Phoenix by Paul VI on August 25, 1969. McCarthy was installed on December 2, 1969.

=== Coadjutor Archbishop and Archbishop of Miami ===
On September 17, 1976, Paul VI appointed McCarthy as the coadjutor archbishop of Miami due to the failing health of Archbishop Coleman F. Carroll. Upon Carroll's death on July 26, 1977, McCarthy automatically succeeded him. Soon after arriving, he oversaw the construction of a Pastoral Center for the diocese and restructured most senior operational divisions. He established the Office of Lay Ministry, the Office of Evangelization and the Permanent Diaconate program.

In 1980, McCarthy was a key figure in offering support and assistance during the Mariel Boat Lift of refugees from Cuba. A year later, he stood up for the rights of Haitian immigrants who were detained under what would become known as the Wet Foot, Dry Foot policy by the US Immigration Service. In response to these incidents, that same year he oversaw the opening of the Pierre Toussaint Haitian Catholic Center in Miami. However, he was also picketed by Reverend Gérard Jean-Juste, who criticized him for not doing more for Haitian refugees and attributed McCarthy's alleged indifference to racism. As punishment, Jean-Juste was forbidden by his church superiors from celebrating mass in the area.

In 1984, McCarthy assisted with the transition of the new Diocese of Venice and Diocese of Palm Beach in Florida. A year later, he would call for the first ever Archdiocesan Synod. Lasting until 1988, it was seen as a method to revitalize the faithful within the archdiocese.

Pope John Paul II visited Miami in 1987. For the first time, he was forced to halt his public mass midway due to a massive thunderstorm. Severe lightning caused the liturgy to be suspended due to safety concerns—an event that had never occurred elsewhere during the Pope's travels. John Paul II completed the offering of the mass inside a trailer, as the crowds dispersed, but only after McCarthy pleaded with them to tend to their own safety.

=== Retirement and legacy ===
In 1993, McCarthy submitted his resignation at the mandatory retirement age of 75. He became officially retired on November 3, 1994. In his final year, he started the planning of a new parish and high school in western Broward County. The church, founded after his retirement, bore his namesake...Saint Edward. Archbishop John C. Favalora named it the Archbishop Edward A. McCarthy High School.

Edward A. McCarthy died in his sleep in Miami on June 7, 2005, at age 87.

== Episcopal succession ==
Catholic Church titles
| Preceded by N/A | Auxiliary Bishop of Cincinnati; 1965–1969 | Succeeded by N/A |
| Preceded by None | Bishop of Phoenix; 1969–1976 | Succeeded by James Steven Rausch |
| Preceded by Coleman F. Carroll | Archbishop of Miami; 1977–1994 | Succeeded by John C. Favalora |
