= St. James Cathedral (Orlando, Florida) =

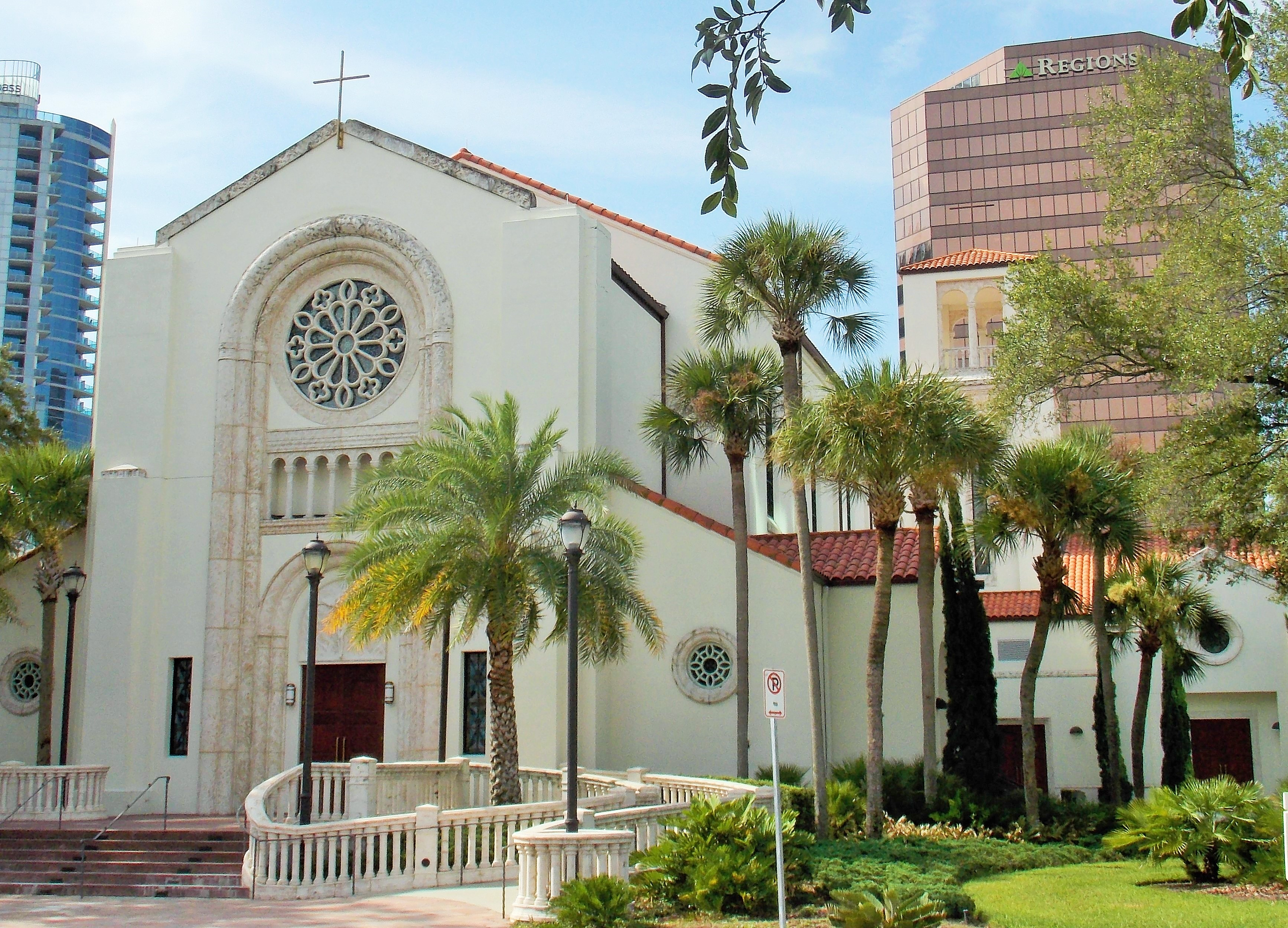

- Location in Florida
- 28°32′43″N 81°22′43″W
- Location: 215 N. Orange Ave. Orlando, Florida
- Country: United States
- Denomination: Roman Catholic Church
- Website: www.stjamesorlando.org

History
- Founded: 1885

Architecture
- Style: Romanesque Revival
- Completed: January 20, 1952

Specifications
- Capacity: 1,200
- Length: 181 feet (55 m)
- Width: 88 feet (27 m)
- Height: 83 feet (25 m)

Administration
- Diocese: Orlando

Clergy
- Bishop: Most Rev. John Noonan
- Rector: Rev. Miguel Gonzalez; Rector

St. James Cathedral is a parish church and the seat of the bishop of the Catholic Diocese of Orlando in Orlando, Florida, in the United States. The cathedral's patron saint is James, son of Zebedee, one of the Twelve Apostles of Jesus.

The parish operates St. James Cathedral School, which offers classes from pre-school through eighth grade.

== History ==
=== St. James Church ===
The predecessor to St. James Cathedral was St. James Church in Orlando. During the 1870s, the few Catholics in Orlando were served by visiting priests of the Diocese of St. Augustine, which then had jurisdiction over the entire state of Florida.

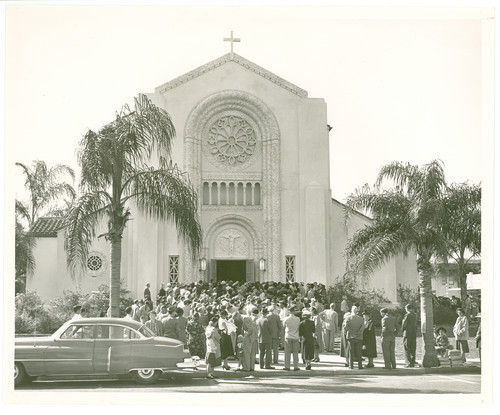
St. James Church (1950)

On May 20, 1881, Bishop John Moore purchased a parcel of land to establish St. James Parish, the first parish in the Orlando area. Its new pastor, Felix P. Swembergh, arrived in 1885 to organize the congregation. He died two years later of yellow fever.

The cornerstone for the first St. James Church was laid on January 23, 1887 and the church was completed in June 1891. The wooden structure measured 40 ft (12 m) by 70 ft (21 m) and accommodated 240 worshipers. The entry was capped by a belltower 45 ft (14 m) tall. A contingent of the Sisters of St. Joseph arrived from St. Augustine in 1889 to open the St. Joseph Academy at St. James Church.

The parish in 1921 opened a new school building for what was now St. James School. The two-story Mediterranean Revival school building is a contributing property in the Lake Eola Heights Historic District. It features a bell tower, an ornate entrance, and embellished friezes. A new convent for the religious sisters was constructed in 1938 next to the school. The parish in 1939 sold a part of the St. James campus to the US Government for a post office and court house. An annex was added to the church in 1941. By the later 1940s, St. James Parish had outgrown its church. They started construction on the second St. James Church in 1950.; it was dedicated on March 9, 1952.

On June 18, 1968, Pope Paul VI erected the Diocese of Orlando and St. Charles Borromeo Church in Orlando was designation as the diocesan cathedral.In 1970, St. James Church underwent its first renovation. The main entrance door was replaced and the diocese added wooden sculptures of St. James, Mary, Mother of Jesus and the Transfiguration of Jesus.

On October 1, 1976, St. Charles Borromeo Cathedral was destroyed by fire. Paul VI quickly granted a request by Bishop Thomas Joseph Grady to designated St. James Church as St. James Cathedral.

=== St. James Cathedral ===
Grady dedicated St. James as the diocesan cathedral on November 20, 1977. A second renovation of the cathedral occurred from 1979 to 1985. During this project, the diocese also constructed a parish life center and the Blessed Sacrament Chapel in the cathedral.

The diocese commenced a major interior renovation of St. James Cathedral in 2009. Work included restoration of stonework on the facade that was covered during the previous renovation, interior decoration, lighting, and installation of windows to comply with current hurricane-codes. A marble altar, tabernacle throne and baptismal font were created in Carrara, Italy to complement new pews. The cathedral organ, Wicks Organ Company Opus 6028, was restored and enlarged by Wicks along with a smaller organ in the cathedral chapel.

Cathedral images

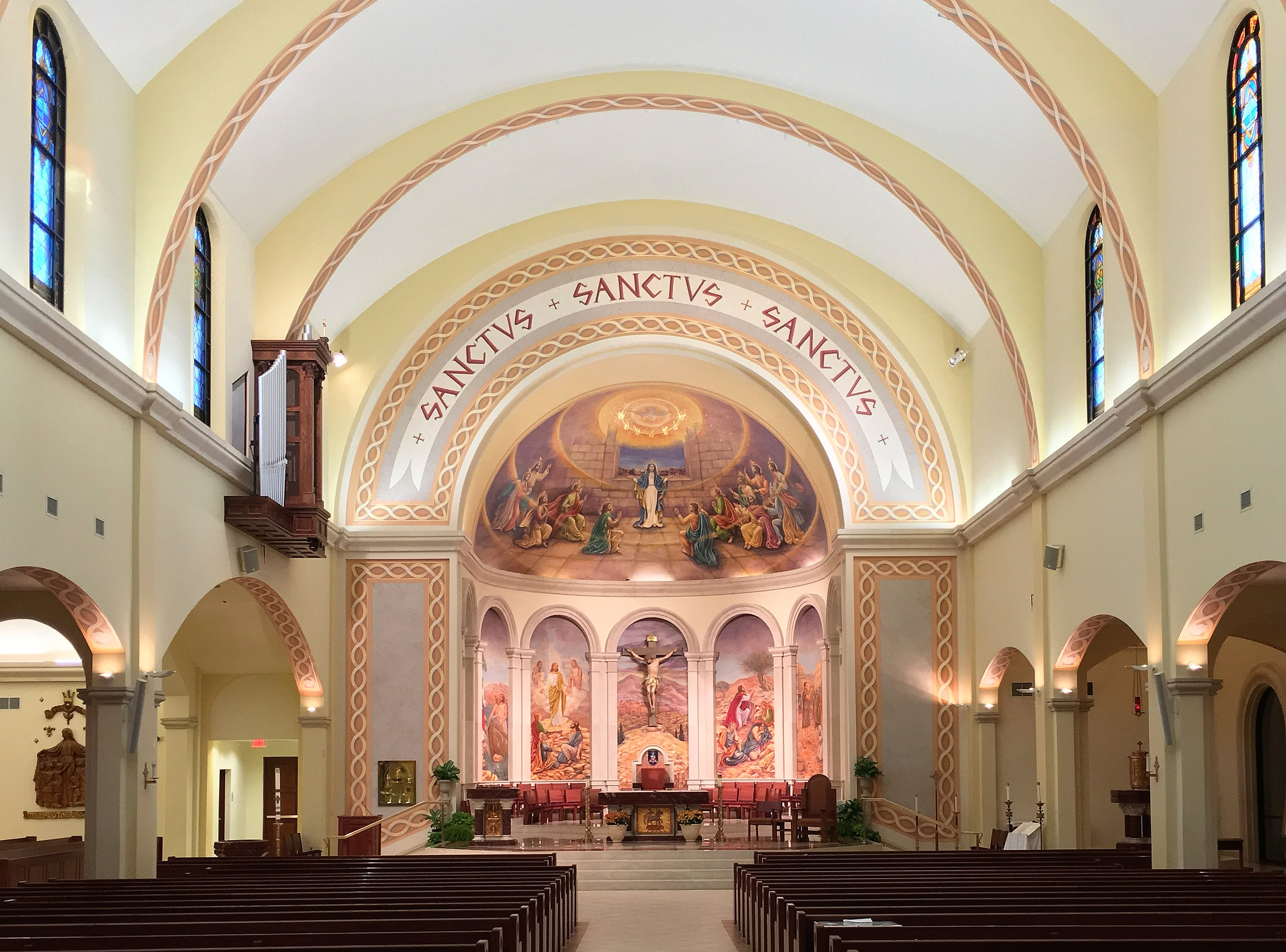
Chancel at end of nave 2026

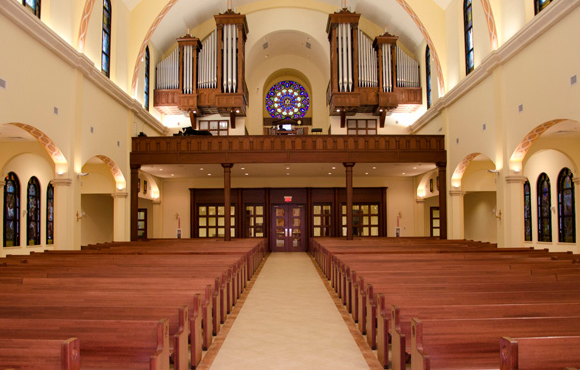
Gallery at end of nave (2018)

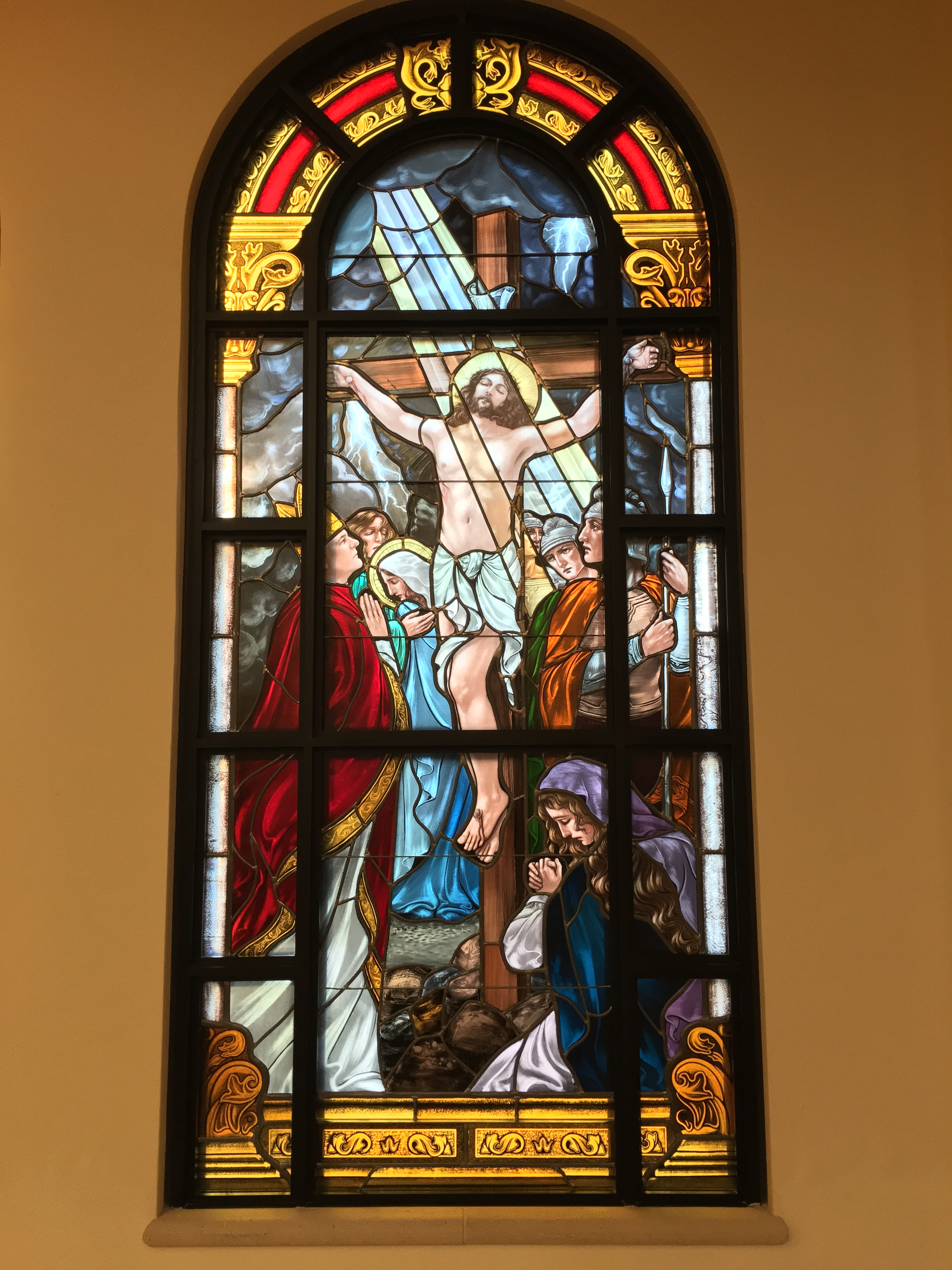
Crucifixion stained glass window (2016)

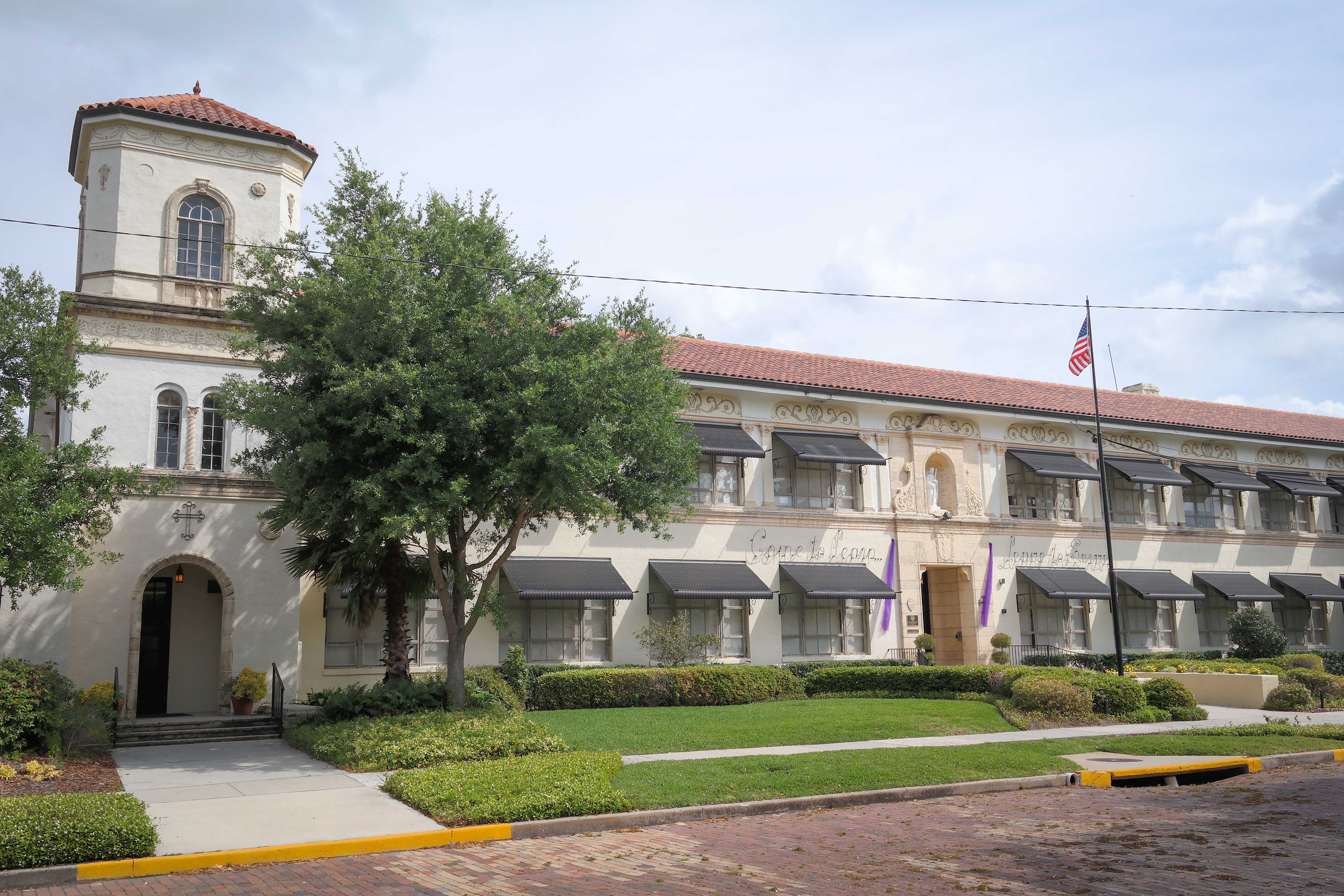
St. James Cathedral School (2014)

== See also ==
- List of Catholic cathedrals in the United States
- List of cathedrals in Florida
