= Queen of the Universe =

Queen of the Universe may refer to:

- Basilica of Mary, Queen of the Universe
- Queen of the Universe (beauty pageant)
- Queen of the Universe (TV series)
