= William Donald Borders =

Catholic bishop

His Excellency, The Most Reverend William Donald Borders
- Archbishop of Baltimore
- See: Baltimore
- Appointed: March 25, 1974
- Installed: June 26, 1974
- Term ended: April 6, 1989
- Predecessor: Lawrence Joseph Shehan
- Successor: William Henry Keeler
- Previous post: Bishop of Orlando (1968-1974)

Orders
- Ordination: May 18, 1940 by Joseph Rummel
- Consecration: June 14, 1968 by Luigi Raimondi

Personal details
- Born: October 9, 1913 Washington, Indiana, US
- Died: April 19, 2010 (aged 96) Timonium, Maryland, US
- Education: Saint Meinrad Seminary; Notre Dame Seminary; University of Notre Dame
- Motto: Auscultabo ut Serviam (I listen that I may serve)
- Coat of arms

Styles of William Donald Borders
- Reference style: His Excellency; The Most Reverend
- Spoken style: Your Excellency
- Religious style: Bishop

William Donald Borders (October 9, 1913 – April 19, 2010) was an American prelate of the Roman Catholic Church. He was the 13th archbishop of Baltimore in Maryland from 1974 to 1989, having previously served as the first bishop of Orlando in Florida from 1968 to 1974.

== Early life and education ==
Borders was born on October 9, 1913, in Washington, Indiana, the third of seven children of Thomas Martin and Zelpha Ann (née Queen) Borders. His birth came during a flood that lifted his family's house off its foundation and forced the physician to reach their house by boat. After attending Catholic elementary and high school, he began his studies for the priesthood at Saint Meinrad Seminary in Saint Meinrad, Indiana, in 1932.

Borders transferred to the Archdiocese of New Orleans in Louisiana in 1936 after Archbishop Joseph Rummel made an appeal for priests and seminarians. He completed his studies at Notre Dame Seminary in New Orleans.

== Priesthood ==
Borders was ordained a priest for the Archdiocese of New Orleans by Rummel on May 18, 1940. The archdiocese assigned Borders as an associate pastor at Sacred Heart Parish in Baton Rouge, Louisiana. In 1943, after the American entry into World War II in 1941, he enlisted in the U.S. Army Chaplain Corps. He received a month's training at Harvard University in Cambridge, Massachusetts, before becoming a battalion chaplain with the 362nd Infantry Regiment of the 91st Infantry Division. His regiment trained in North Africa for the Italian Campaign. During an attack on a German position near Florence, Italy in 1944, Borders carried a wounded American soldier to safety while under machine gun fire. Borders was awarded the Bronze Star for Valor.

In 1946, after the end of the war, Borders left the military service with the rank of major and returned to Louisiana. He briefly served as an associate pastor at Our Lady of Prompt Succor Parish in Westwego, Louisiana, then entered the University of Notre Dame in Indiana to pursue graduate studies. After earning a Master of Science degree in education in 1947, Borders returned to Louisiana as associate pastor at Our Lady of Lourdes Parish in New Orleans. The archdiocese later named him as an assistant chaplain of the Newman Centre at Louisiana State University (LSU) in Baton Rouge. During his tenure at LSU, he spent a summer in Guatemala to better serve his Hispanic students.

The archdiocese in 1957 sent Borders to Port Allen, Louisiana, to serve as pastor of Holy Family Parish. While pastor, he ended racial segregation at the parish. He burned the ropes used in the church to divide sections for White and African-American parishioners. The groups gradually integrated throughout the church.After two years at Holy Family, Borders returned to LSU, where he was eventually named chaplain of the Newman Center.

In 1961, when the Diocese of Baton Rouge was created out of the Archdiocese of New Orleans, Borders was Incardinated, or transferred, to the new diocese. Borders was raised to the rank of domestic prelate by Pope Paul VI in 1963, and named rector of St. Joseph Catholic School the following year. He also served as a diocesan consultor, director of seminarians, and moderator for the diocesan councils of Catholic Men and Women, and co-founded of St. Joseph Cathedral Preparatory School. He attended the last two sessions of the Second Vatican Council in Rome in 1963 and 1964 as a peritus, or theological expert, on the priesthood and ecumenical relations.

== Episcopacy ==
=== Bishop of Orlando ===
On May 2, 1968, Pope Paul VI appointed Borders as the first bishop of the newly erected Diocese of Orlando. He received his episcopal consecration on June 14, 1968, from Archbishop Luigi Raimondi, with Bishops Robert Emmet Tracy and Louis Abel Caillouet serving as co-consecrators. He selected as his episcopal motto: "Auscultabo ut Serviam" (Latin: "I shall listen that I may serve").

During his tenure in Orlando, Borders laid the foundations for the new diocese while also implementing the directives of the Second Vatican Council. He oversaw the creation of parish councils and education boards, allowed the laity to serve as extraordinary ministers of Holy Communion, and formed a Sisters' Council for the nuns of the diocese. He created a Social Services Board to correlate the work of already-existing agencies, and developed a comprehensive educational program aimed at coordinating efforts in Catholics schools, campus ministry, and religious education. He also initiated social outreach centers to minister to migrant workers and the poor.

It is said that Borders once described himself as the "Bishop of the Moon" since the Diocese of Orlando encompassed Merritt Island in Florida, where the Apollo 11 space mission to the moon launched in 1969. He supposedly told Pope Paul VI that according to the Code of Canon Law in effect at the time, any newly discovered territory fell under the jurisdiction of the diocese where the expedition originated. However, such a statement does not exist in the 1917 Code of Canon Law, it is unclear if this anecdote happened, and the secretary of communications for the diocese says that it does not claim the moon.

=== Archbishop of Baltimore ===
Following the retirement of Cardinal Lawrence Shehan, Borders was appointed the 13th archbishop of Baltimore by Paul VI on March 25, 1974. He was installed at the Cathedral of Mary Our Queen in Baltimore on June 26 of that year. He received the pallium, a vestment worn by metropolitan bishops, from Paul VI at St. Peter's Basilica in Rome on March 24, 1975. As head of the nation's oldest Catholic diocese, he held the status of primus inter pares among the American Catholic bishops.

During his 15-year tenure in Baltimore, Borders divided the archdiocese into three vicariates and appointed his auxiliary bishops as vicars over them. He reorganized the Archdiocesan Central Services, naming cabinet-level secretaries to carry out the administrative work of the archdiocese. He clarified and strengthened the role of the archdiocesan Pastoral Council, and combined the Board of Consultors and the Senate of Priests to form the Priests' Council. He initiated a Department of Pastoral Planning and Management looking to the future needs of the archdiocese, an Office of Fund Development to carry out an effective stewardship program, and an evangelization effort to reach the "unchurched" in the archdiocese. Instead of living at the residence at the Basilica of the Assumption, he lived alone at the former sexton's lodge, which is now the gift shop of the basilica.

Borders became what Baltimore Magazine called the "king of the soup kitchens". Under his leadership in Baltimore, the budget for the local branch of Catholic Charities grew from $2.5 million a year to $33 million a year, and its staff grew from 200 to more than 1,000. He regularly lobbied members of the U.S. Congress and other government officials on behalf of the disadvantaged. In 1981, in company with other leading Catholic educators, he made a three-week tour of the People's Republic of China to investigate the possibilities for an exchange of cultural and educational programs between China and the United States.

Borders was named in two lawsuits involving clergy sexual abuse, one in Baltimore in 1993 and another in Orlando in 2003. In both cases, he was accused of knowing about alleged abuse by priests in his dioceses but avoiding action against them. The conditions of the Baltimore settlement remain confidential; the Orlando case was settled without Borders' admitting any wrongdoing.

As a member of the United States Conference of Catholic Bishops, he chaired the Committee on Education and served on the Committee on Human Values, the Administrative Board of the U.S. Catholic Conference, and the Administrative Committee of the National Conference of Catholic Bishops. He also chaired the Ad Hoc Committee for the Bicentennial of the U.S. Hierarchy.

== Later life and death ==
After reaching the mandatory retirement age of 75, Borders submitted his letter of resignation as archbishop of Baltimore to Pope John Paul II, who accepted his resignation on April 6, 1989. His successor was William H. Keeler, then serving as bishop of Harrisburg.

In 2003, Borders moved to the Mercy Ridge Retirement Community in Lutherville, Maryland. He later moved to Stella Maris Hospice in nearby Timonium, Maryland, after being diagnosed with colon cancer. He died at Stella Maris at age 96 — the fourth-oldest living Catholic bishop in the United States, and the longest-surviving of the bishops of both Orlando and Baltimore.

== See also ==
- Catholic Church hierarchy
- Catholic Church in the United States
- Historical list of the Catholic bishops of the United States
- List of Catholic bishops of the United States
- Lists of patriarchs, archbishops, and bishops

== Episcopal succession ==
Catholic Church titles
Preceded by diocese created	Bishop of Orlando; 1968–1974	Succeeded by Thomas Joseph Grady
Preceded by Lawrence Shehan	Archbishop of Baltimore; 1974–1989	Succeeded by William Henry Keeler
