= Basilica of St. Paul (Daytona Beach, Florida) =

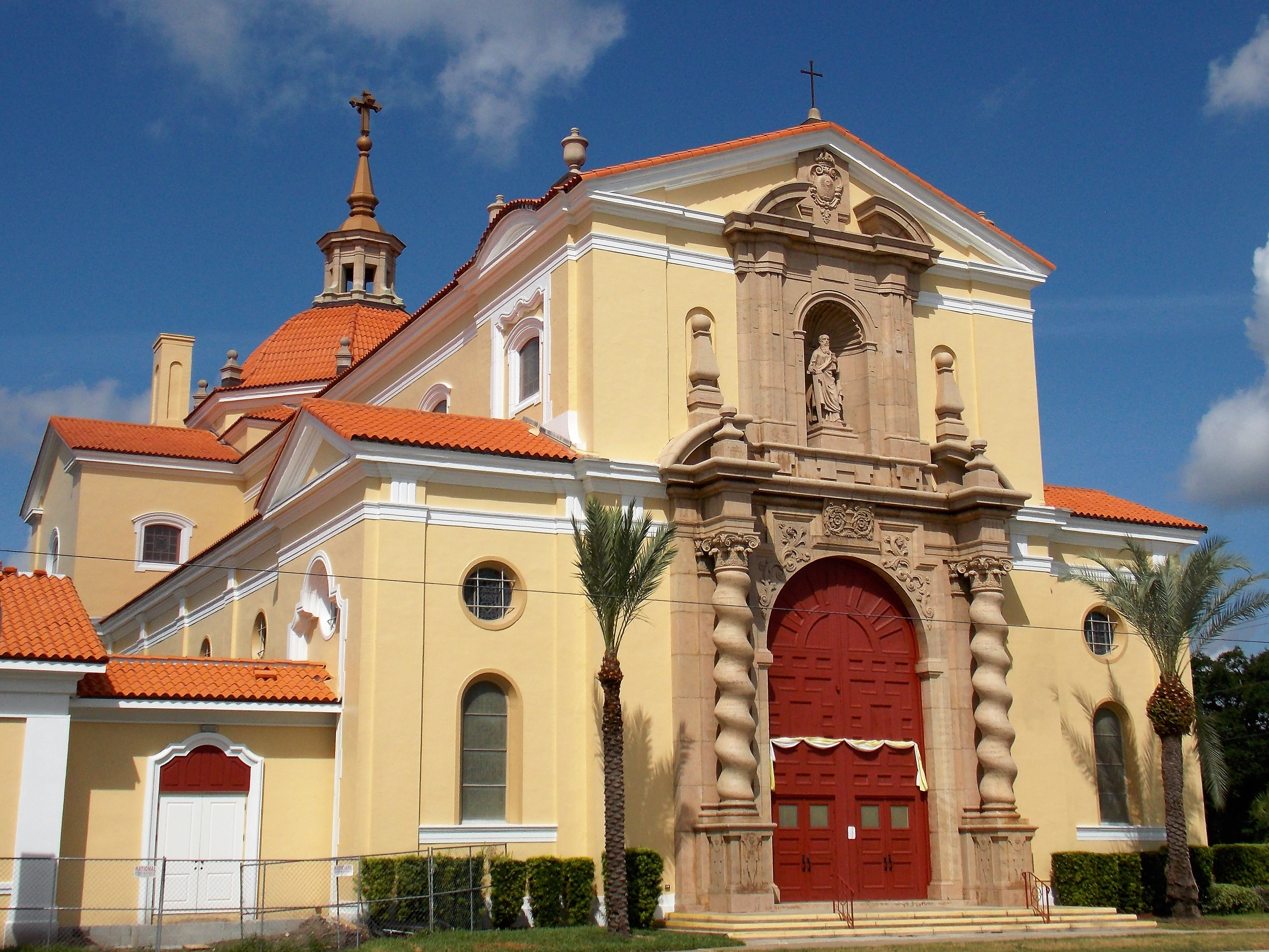

- Location in Florida
- 29°13′03″N 81°01′37″W
- Location: 317 Mullally Street; Daytona Beach, Florida
- Country: United States
- Denomination: Roman Catholic Church
- Website: stpauldaytona.org

History
- Founded: 1881

Architecture
- Architect: Gerald A. Barry
- Style: Mission Revival
- Completed: 1927
- Construction cost: $250,000

Specifications
- Capacity: 1,150
- Length: 181 feet (55 m)
- Width: 80 feet (24 m)

Administration
- Diocese: Orlando

Clergy
- Bishop: Most Rev. John G. Noonan
- Rector: Rev. Timothy P. Daly

The Basilica of St. Paul is a minor basilica of the Catholic Church located in Daytona Beach, Florida, United States. It is also a parish church of the Diocese of Orlando.

== History ==
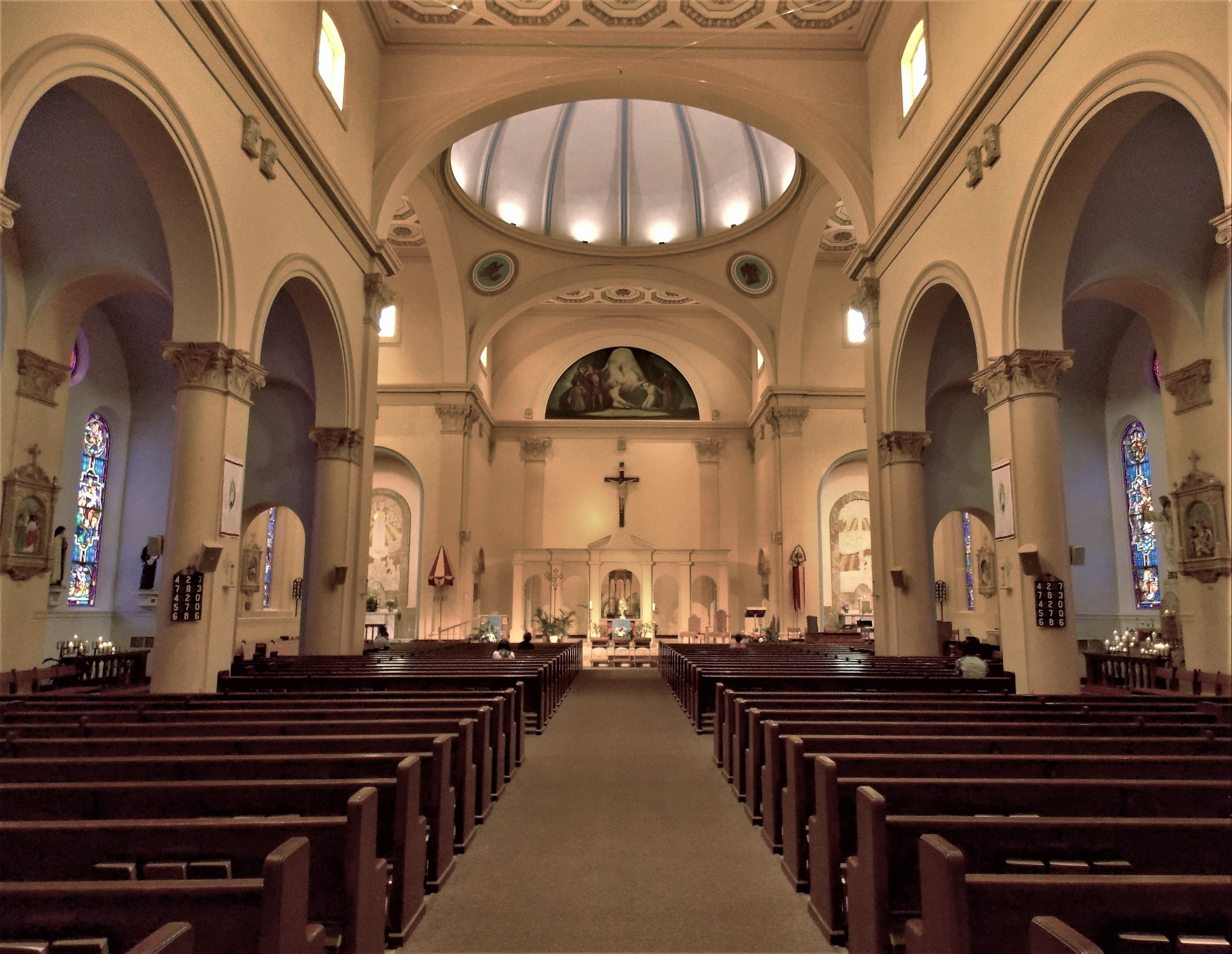
Interior of the basilica

The first Catholics that moved to Daytona Beach arrived in 1881. Mass was celebrated in private homes a couple of times a year by priests who traveled from DeLand. Daytona Beach became a mission of St. Teresa Church in Titusville in 1886. Mass was now celebrated every Sunday in either the opera house or the armory. The Rev. John F. O’Boyle became the first resident priest in Daytona Beach in 1895. He purchased property on South Palmetto and Myrtle Avenues and built a church in 1898. The Rev. William J. Mullally arrived in 1923 and made plans to build a school and a new church. The school, which opened in 1925, was the only Catholic school on Florida's East Coast between St. Augustine and West Palm Beach at that time. He built the present church, which was completed in 1927. Construction costs totaled around $250,000. The cupola (dome) and cross on top of the building date from 2006. They replace the ones damaged in the hurricanes of 2004.

Pope Benedict XVI decreed on January 20, 2006, that St. Paul's church was elevated to the status of a minor basilica. It was solemnized by Bishop Thomas G. Wenski on the Feast of the Conversion of St. Paul that same year.

== Architecture ==
The Mission Revival structure was designed by Chicago architect Gerald A. Barry. When it was built it was the tallest building on the mainland, and it was one of the first buildings in the area to be built with central heat and air-conditioning. Above the altar is a fresco of the conversion of St. Paul.
