= Diocese of Orlando =

Diocese of the Catholic Church

Diocese of Orlando Dioecesis Orlandensis
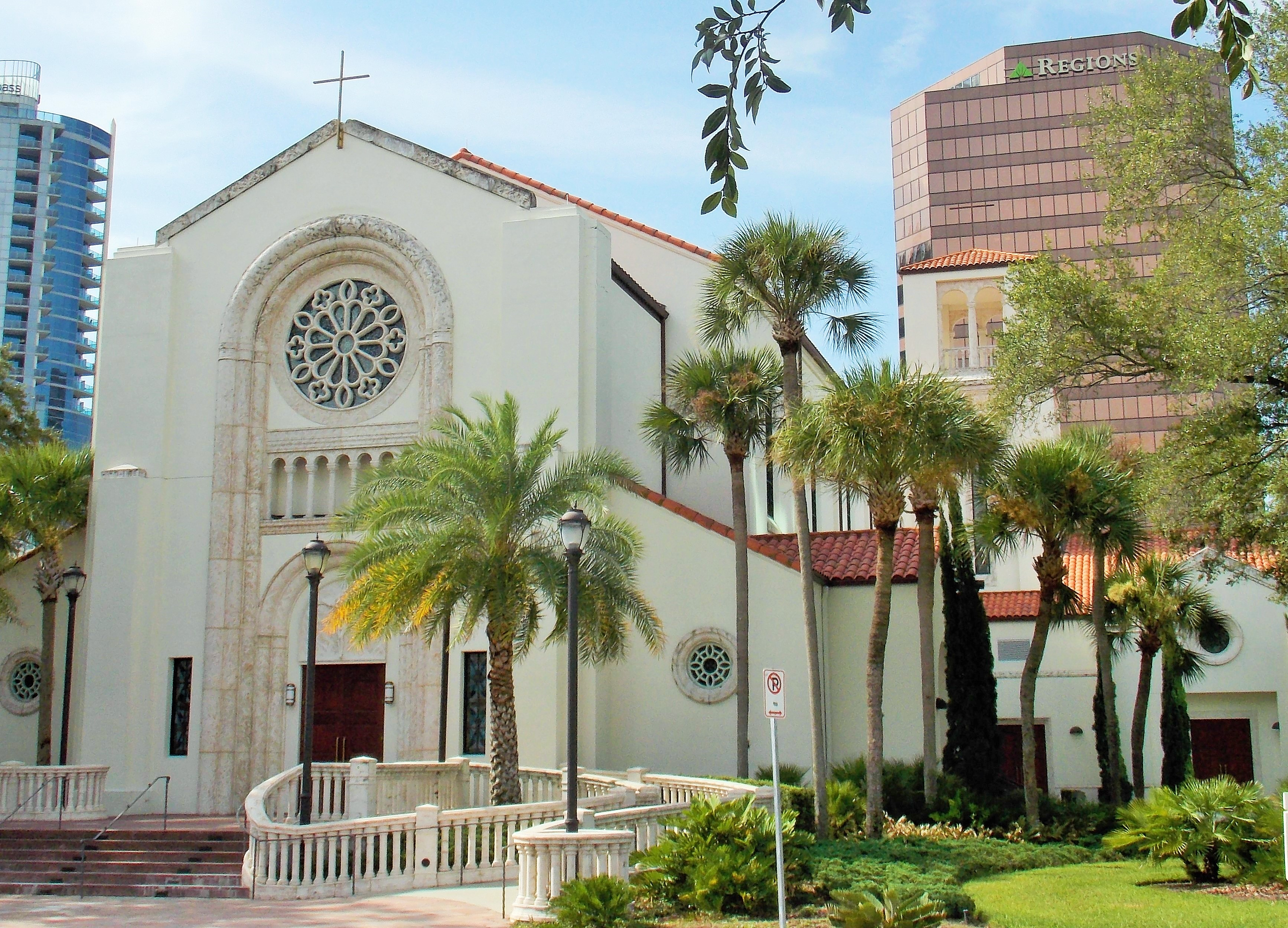
- St. James Cathedral

- Coat of arms

Location
- Country: United States
- Territory: Counties of Orange, Osceola, Seminole, Marion, Lake, Volusia, Brevard, Polk, Sumter
- Ecclesiastical province: Miami
- Coordinates: 28°32′43.2″N 81°22′40.11″W

Statistics
- Area: 24,893 km^{2} (9,611 sq mi)
- Population: Total; Catholics: (as of 2022); 5,064,237; 400,923 (8%)
- Parishes: 81
- Schools: 38

Information
- Denomination: Catholic
- Sui iuris church: Latin Church
- Rite: Roman Rite
- Established: March 2, 1968
- Cathedral: St. James Cathedral
- Patron saint: Mary, Mother of God

Current leadership
- Pope: Leo XIV
- Bishop: John Gerard Noonan
- Metropolitan Archbishop: Thomas Wenski
- Vicar General: John C. Giel
- Judicial Vicar: Martin Nguyen

Map
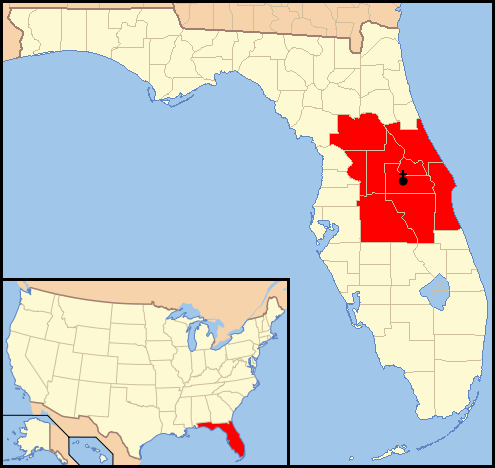

Website
- orlandodiocese.org

The Diocese of Orlando (Latin: Dioecesis Orlandensis) is a diocese of the Catholic Church in central Florida in the United States. St. James Cathedral serves as the seat of the diocese. The bishop is John Gerard Noonan.

== Statistics ==
The Diocese of Orlando encompasses about 9,611 square miles (24,890 km^{2}), spanning the Orange, Osceola, Seminole, Marion, Lake, Volusia, Brevard, Polk, and Sumter counties. The Kennedy Space Center and Walt Disney World are located within the diocese.

== History ==
=== 1700 to 1800 ===
By the early 1700s, the Spanish Franciscans had established a network of forty missions in what is now Northern and Central Florida. However, raids by British settlers and their Creek Native American allies from the Carolinas eventually shut down the missions.

After the end of the French and Indian War in 1763, Spain ceded all of Florida to Great Britain for the return of Cuba. Given the antagonism of Protestant Great Britain to Catholicism, the majority of the Catholic population in Florida fled to Cuba. After the American Revolution ended in 1783, Spain regained control of Florida in 1784. In 1793, the Vatican changed the jurisdiction for Florida Catholics from Diocese of Havana in Cuba (erected in 1787 from the Diocese of Santiago de Cuba), to the Diocese of Louisiana and the Two Floridas, based in New Orleans, but, after the Louisiana purchase (1803), Florida returned in 1806 to the Diocese of Havana (until 1823).

=== 1800 to 1900 ===
In the Adams–Onís Treaty of 1819, Spain ceded all of Florida to the United States, which established the Florida Territory in 1821.

In 1825, Pope Leo XII erected the Vicariate of Alabama and Florida, which included all of Florida, based in Mobile, Alabama. In 1858, Pius IX moved Florida into a new Apostolic Vicariate of Florida, which in 1870 was converted into the Diocese of St. Augustine. The new diocese covered all of Florida except for the Florida Panhandle region. The first Catholic church in Ocala was St. Philip Neri, a clapboard structure built in 1883. Today the parish is called Blessed Trinity.In 1898, St. Paul's Church was dedicated in Daytona Beach, the first Catholic church in that community.

=== 1900 to 1970 ===
The first Catholic church in Brevard County was St. Joseph in Melbourne, dedicated in 1914.In 1939 Florida Catholic started publication.Pope Paul VI erected the Diocese of Orlando on June 18, 1968, taking its present territory from the Diocese of St. Augustine and making it a suffragan of the Archdiocese of Miami. He appointed William Borders of the Diocese of Baton Rouge as the first bishop of Orlando. At its formation, the new diocese consisted of 50 parishes with 128,000 Catholics. Soon after his installation as bishop, Borders opened a chapter of the Council of Catholic Women.

In 1969, the Apollo 11 moon mission was launched from the Kennedy Space Center on Merritt Island. According to a diocesan publication, Borders joked to Paul VI that he was now bishop of the moon, citing canon law about newly discovered territories. (Note: Other bishops made similar claims, notably Archbishop Terence Cooke who had jurisdiction over the Kennedy Space Center as vicar of the Military Ordinariate. The validity of the bishop's Moon argument has been questioned. In any case, the pope has ultimate authority over diocesan boundaries. Additionally, the issue remains moot as long as the moon is uninhabited.) Also in 1969, Borders established the Catholic Charismatic Commission to serve Charismatic Catholics. In 1971, Borders initiated a ministry for migrant farm workers in Apopka. He also established that year a Catholic committee on Scouting for parishes sponsoring boy scout and girl scout packs.

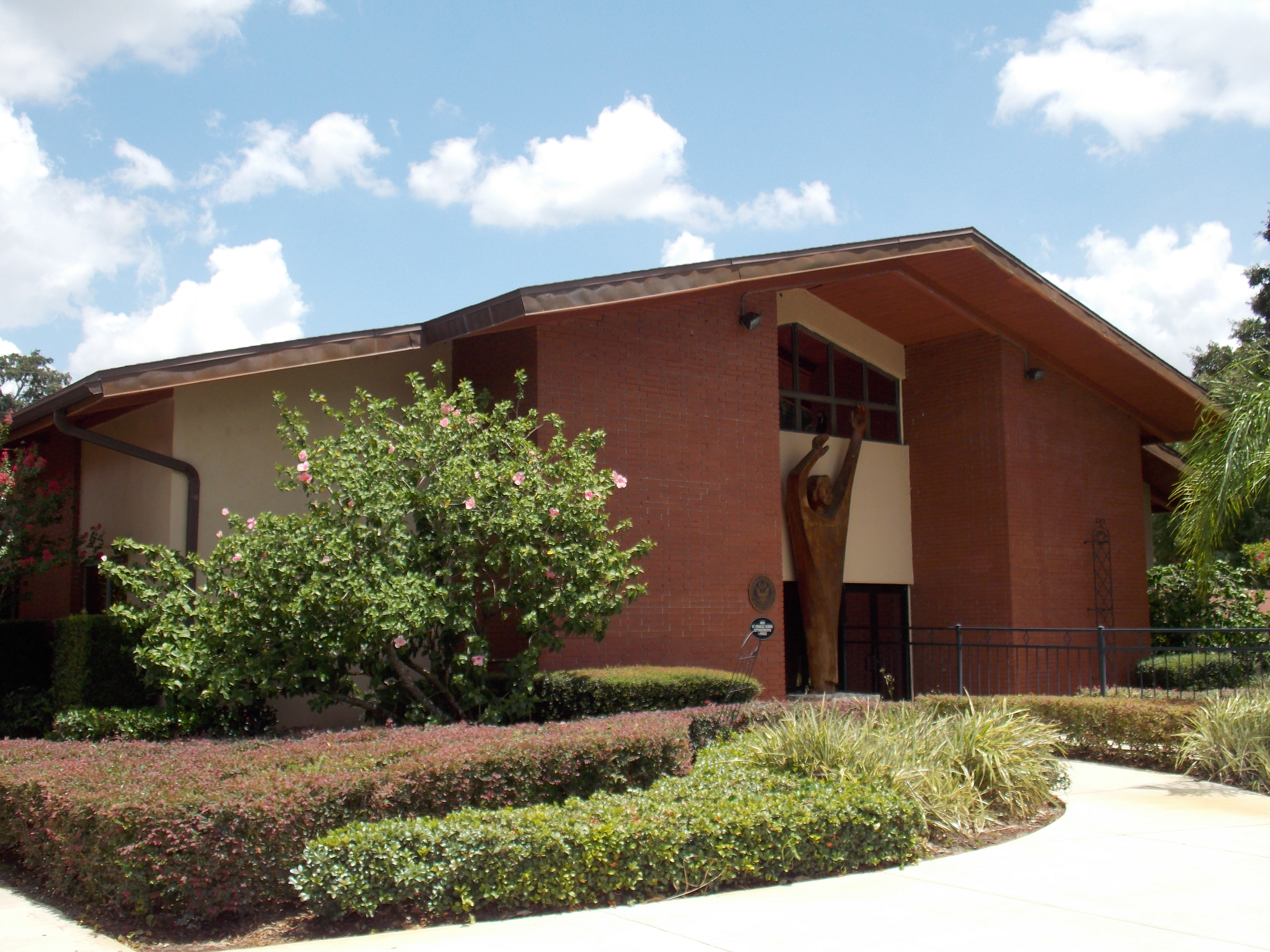
Former St. Charles Borromeo Cathedral, Orlando, Florida (2016)

During his tenure in Orlando, Borders oversaw the creation of parish councils and education boards, allowed the laity to serve as extraordinary ministers of the eucharist and formed a Sisters' Council for the nuns of the diocese. A Social Services Board correlated the work of already-existing agencies, and developed an educational program aimed at coordinating efforts in Catholic schools, campus ministry, and religious education. Borders also initiated social outreach centers to the poor.

=== 1970 to 1980 ===
In 1974, Paul VI named Borders as archbishop of the Archdiocese of Baltimore. The second bishop of Orlando was Auxiliary Bishop Thomas Grady from the Archdiocese of Chicago, appointed by Paul VI in 1974. Grady converted a diocesan summer camp in Winter Park into the San Pedro Spiritual Development Center. He oversaw the establishment of 18 new parishes.. Grady wrote a weekly column for the Florida Catholic.

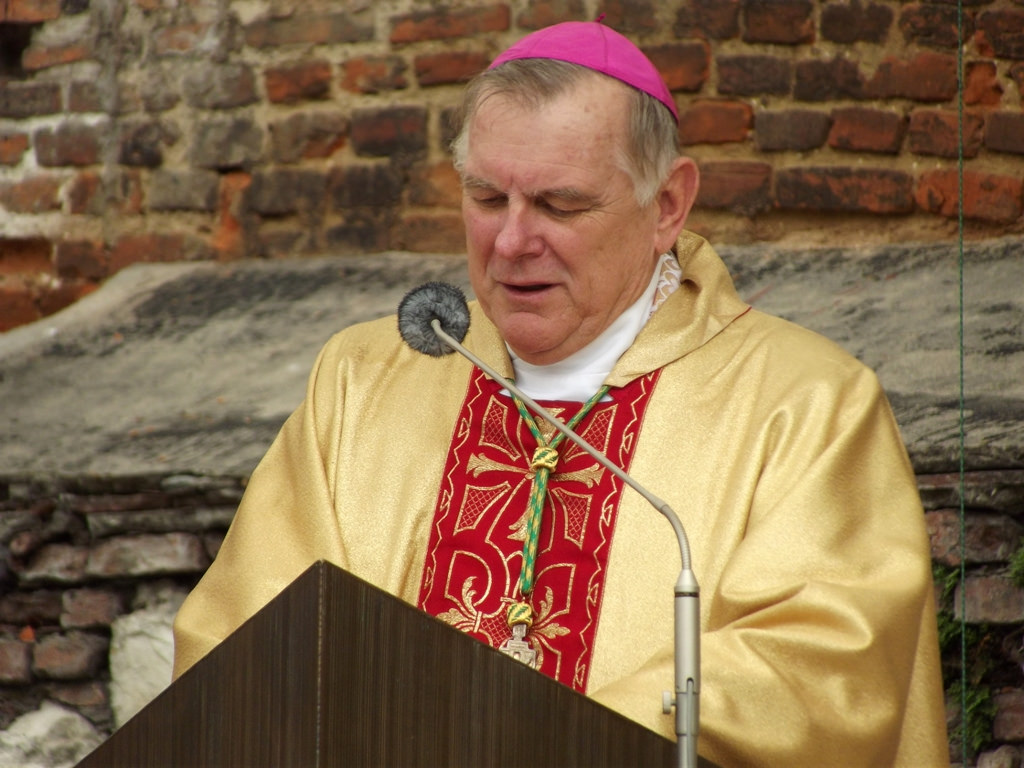
Archbishop Wenski (2014)

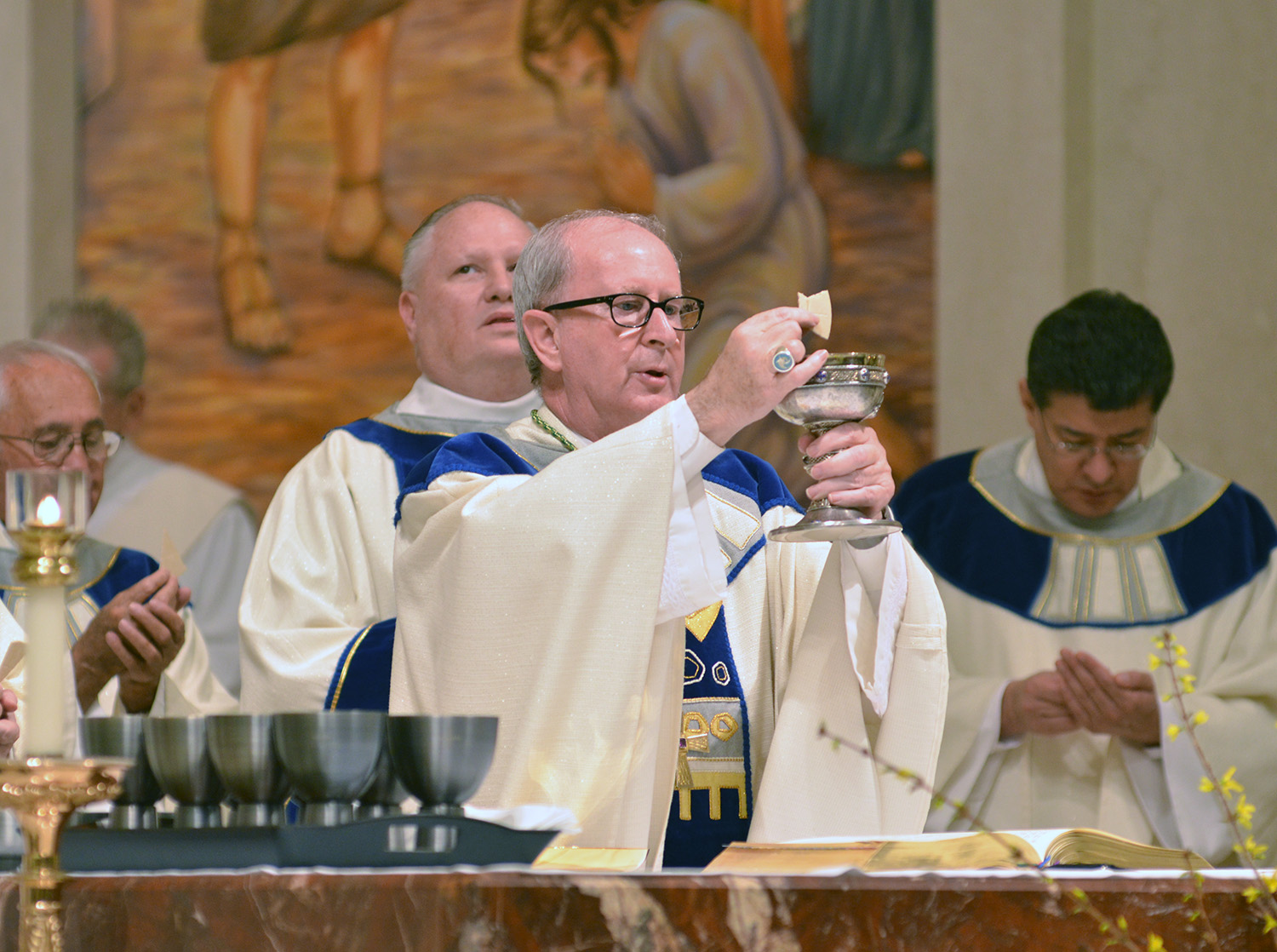
Bishop Noonan (2012)

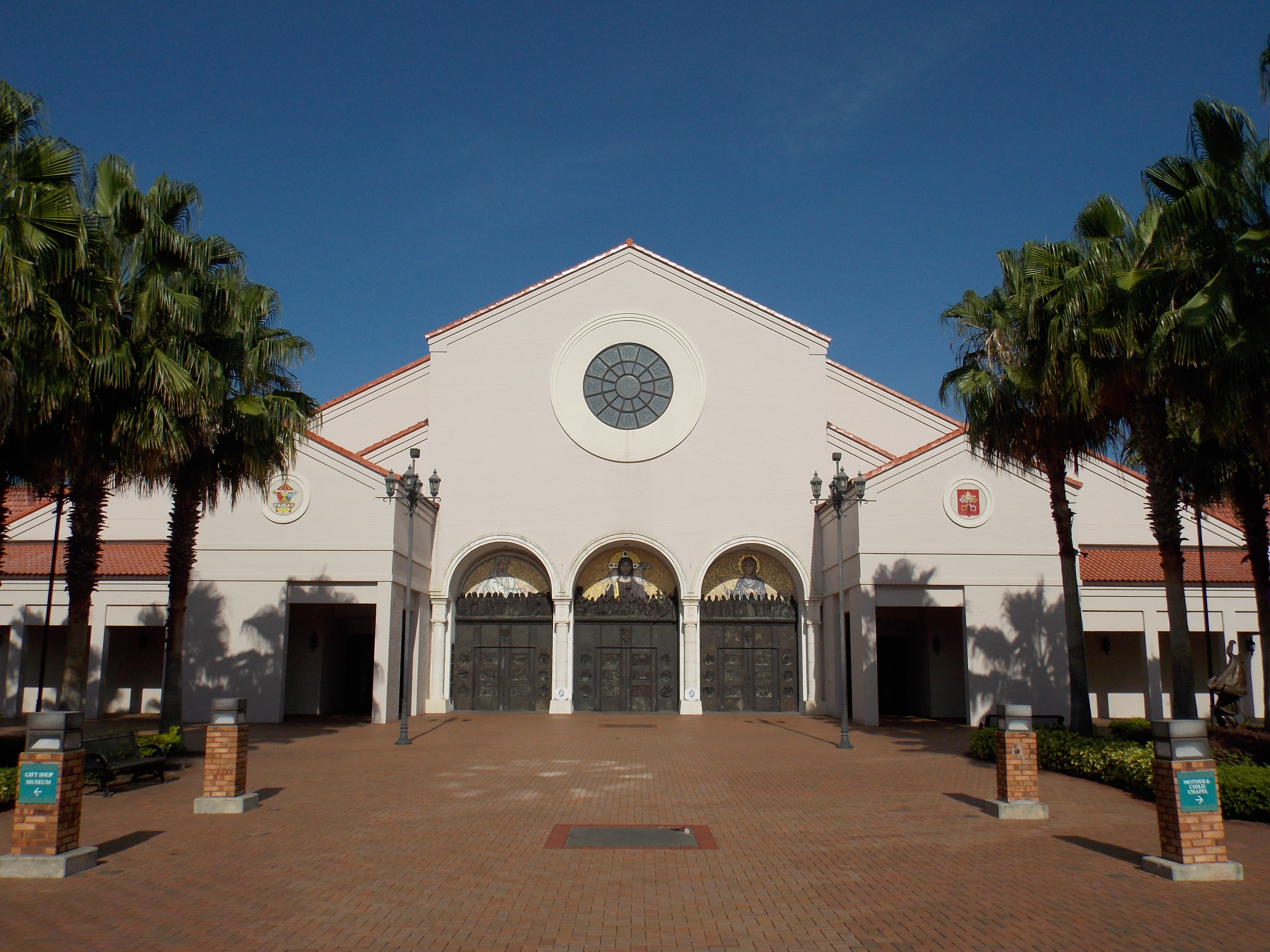
Basilica of Mary, Queen of the Universe, Buena Vista (2016)

During Grady's tenure, the diocese saw significant growth. In 1976, St. Charles Borromeo Church in the College Park section of Orlando, the original cathedral, was destroyed by fire. St. James Church in Orlando was designated as the new cathedral. To provide ministerial outreach to vacationers visiting Walt Disney World and the Lake Buena Vista Resort, Grady created a parish in the Lake Buena Vista area.

=== 1980 to 2000 ===
Grady in 1983 founded a mission office to coordinate with the Diocese of San Juan de la Maguana in the Dominican Republic.

In 1984, Grady oversaw the beginning of construction of the Shrine of Mary, Queen of the Universe in Buena Vista; it was a site closer to the Disney theme parks. The diocese also expanded ministries to migrants and minorities, founded a scholarship program for African American students, and built apartment buildings for the elderly.

The first Catholic Parish in The Villages was St. Timothy, erected to serve the retirees in that community.Grady resigned as bishop of Orlando in 1989. By the time of Grady's retirement as bishop of Orlando in 1990, the Catholic population of the diocese had grown over 76% and the number of parishes had increased by more than a third.

Pope John Paul II in 1990 named Auxiliary Bishop Norbert Dorsey of Miami as the next bishop of Orlando. In August 1993, the diocese dedicated Mary, Queen of the Universe Shrine. In 1996, the diocese held a large-scale confirmation ceremony at the Orlando Arena. Over 11,000 people attended the event.

=== 2000 to 2010 ===
The diocese in 2001 purchased the former post office in downtown Orlando for its new chancery.Auxiliary Bishop Thomas Wenski of Miami was selected by John Paul II as coadjutor bishop of Orlando in 2003 to assist Dorsey.

The United States Conference of Catholic Bishops (USCCB) at Wenski's request, designated the Shrine of Mary, Queen of the Universe as a national shrine in 2004. Dorsey's tenure saw further growth especially due to the growing Hispanic community. Radio Paz and health clinics for migrant and farm workers were established to minister to this community. Bishop Grady Villas in St. Cloud was founded by the diocese in 2004 as a residential community in Orlando for adults with intellectual and developmental disabilities. Today it is part of Magnify of Central Florida. Dorsey retired as bishop of Orlando in November 2004. Wenski automatically succeeded him as bishop or Orlando.

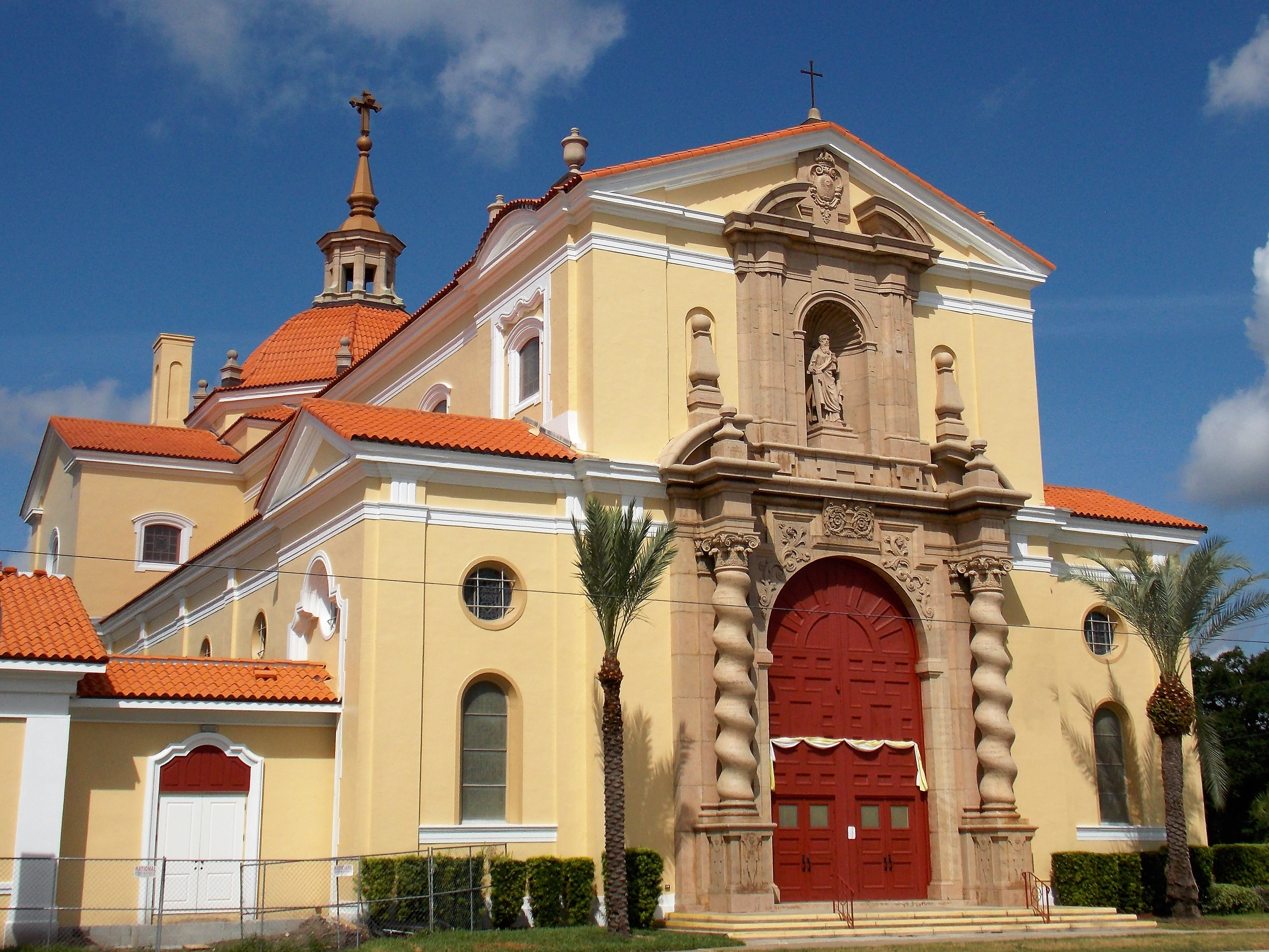
Basilica of St. Paul, Daytona Beach (2016)

Wenski convoked the first synod for the diocese in 2004. During his tenure, Wenski created six new parishes and two mission churches. A capital and endowment campaign raised $100 million. In 2006, Wenski celebrated the designation of St. Paul Church in Daytona Beach as the Basilica of St. Paul.

The Spanish language radio station, Buena Nueva FM, and a newspaper, El Clarin, were also started. The USCCB held their spring convocation in the diocese in 2008. Wenski also designated 2008 as the "Year of Evangelization".

=== 2010 to present ===
In 2009, the Vatican raised the Mary, Queen of the Universe National Shrine in Orlando to the status of minor basilicas. That same year, the diocese began both a $150 million capital campaign and an extensive renovation of St. James Cathedral in Orlando.

Pope Benedict XVI named Wenski as archbishop of Miami in April 2010. Richard Walsh, pastor of St. Margaret Mary Parish in Winter Park, was elected as diocesan administrator of Orlando until the next bishop was installed. Auxiliary Bishop John Noonan of Miami was Wenski's replacement, nominated in October of 2010.

In 2019, referring to the 1969 story about the moon being part of the diocese, a diocesan spokesperson stated that Noonan did not consider himself bishop of the moon or of the International Space Station.

A man set a fire inside Queen of Peace Church in Ocala in July 2020 while the staff was preparing for mass. He first crashed his minivan through the front doors, spilled gasoline on the floor and ignited it, then drove away. The fire was quickly extinguished and no one was injured. The perpetrator, reportedly suffering from schizophrenia, was quickly arrested.

==== Reports of sex abuse ====
In November 1985, the families of four boys sued the Diocese of Orlando, claiming sexual abuse by William Authenrieth, associate pastor at St. Mary's Parish in Rockledge. That same year, Bishop Grady permanently removed Authenrieth from ministry; he left the priesthood in 1986. In December 1987, the diocese settled the case with the Rockledge families for $3 million.

In February 1995, a man sued the diocese, saying that he had been sexually abused as a youth by former priest Thomas Pagni. The plaintiff claimed that Pagni, then a mental health counselor in Brevard County, sexually assaulted him for several months in 1992. Pagni was arrested in March 1995 on charges of engaging in sexual activity with a minor and engaging in lewdness. Another victim was added to the criminal case in June 1995. In January 1996, Pagni pleaded no contest to the ten charges against him and was sentenced to ten years in prison.

In 2004, the diocese announced that it had removed from ministry 12 priests accused of committing sex abuse since the founding of the diocese in 1968.

Wladyslaw Gorak (also known as Walter Fisher), pastor of the Church of the Resurrection in South Lakeland, was arrested in October 2004 after breaking down the door at the residence of a female acquaintance and sexually assaulting her. Gorak had transferred to Orlando in 2000 from the Archdiocese of Newark. Despite him having a record of inappropriate behavior with women in Newark, the archdiocese did not mention that to diocesan officials in Orlando. Gorak was sentenced to four years of probation in 2007. The woman later sued the Archdiocese of Newark and received a settlement from them.

== Bishops ==
=== Bishops of Orlando ===
1. William Donald Borders (1968 – 1974), appointed Archbishop of Baltimore
2. Thomas Joseph Grady (1974 – 1989)
3. Norbert Dorsey (1990 – 2004)
4. Thomas Wenski (2004 – 2010), appointed Archbishop of Miami
5. John Gerard Noonan (2010 – present)

=== Other diocesan priests who became bishops ===
- Gregory Lawrence Parkes, appointed Bishop of Pensacola-Tallahassee in 2012
- Stephen Douglas Parkes, appointed Bishop of Savannah in 2020

== Present administration ==
=== Deaneries ===
The 80 parishes and 11 missions of the Diocese of Orlando are divided into five deaneries:

- Eastern Deanery (Volusia County) – Daytona Beach
- Southern Deanery (Brevard County) – Melbourne
- Northern Deanery (Marion, Sumter, and Lake Counties) – The Villages
- Western Deanery (Polk County) – Lakeland
- Central Deanery (Osceola, Orange, Seminole Counties) – Orlando

The diocese has a sister diocese in La Cucarita in the Dominican Republic. Volunteers from the Diocese of Orlando built two churches and one community center in La Cucarita. The medical mission there helped 2,000 patients in 2007.

== Education ==
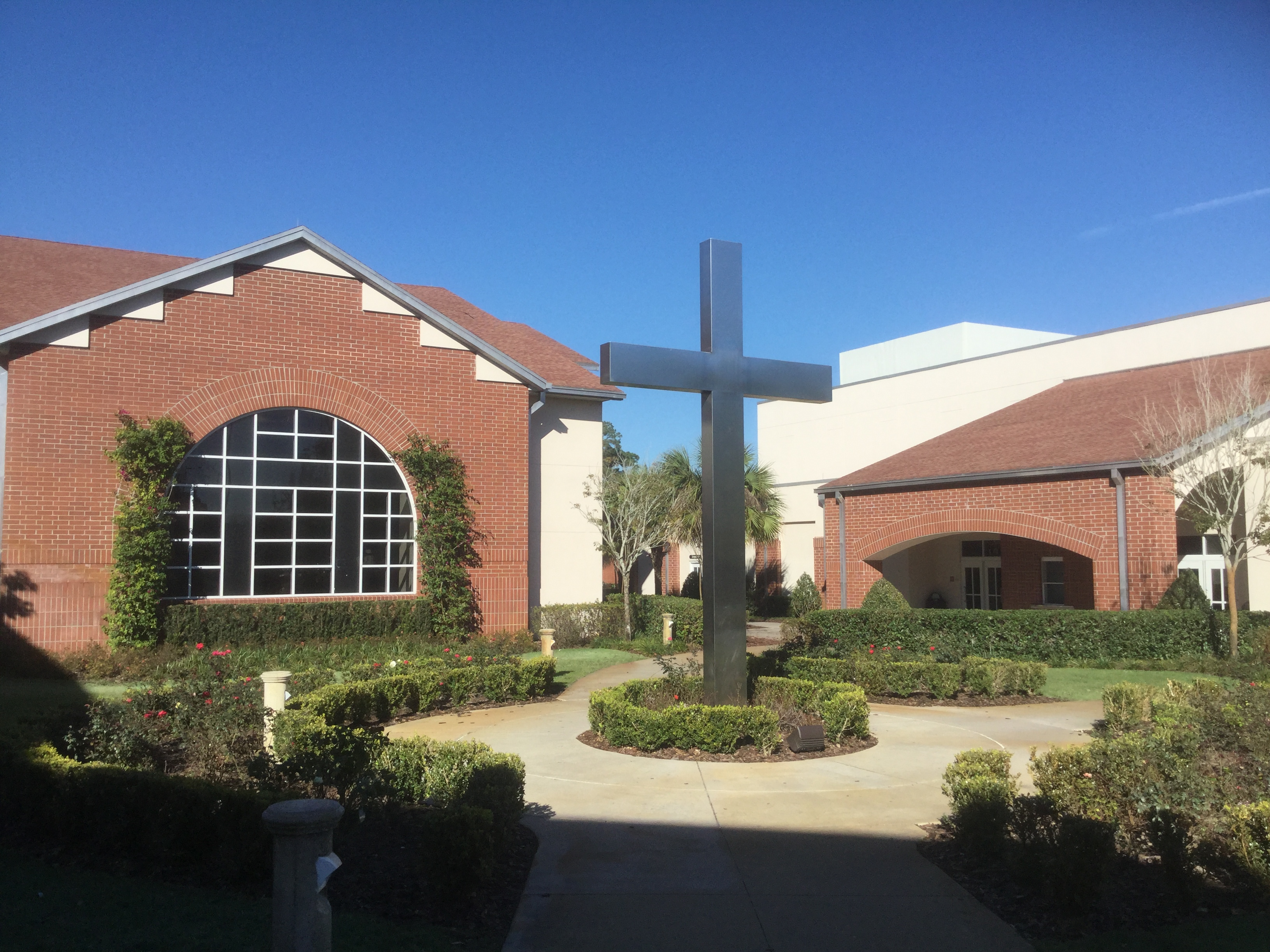
Bishop Moore High School

As of 2026, the Diocese of Orlando was operating five high schools, 29 elementary schools, one special education school, and three early childhood centers.

In 2008, the National Catholic Educational Association recognized the diocesan school board as "outstanding", the only diocesan board in the United States to receive that honor. At the same time, the Father Lopez Catholic High School board in Daytona Beach was also recognized as outstanding.

=== High schools ===
- Bishop Moore Catholic High School – Orlando
- Father Lopez Catholic High School – Daytona Beach
- Melbourne Central Catholic High School – Melbourne
- Santa Fe Catholic High School – Lakeland
- Trinity Catholic Catholic High School – Ocala

== Colleges and universities ==
The diocese supports Catholic campus ministries at the following institutions:

- Embry-Riddle Aeronautical University (ERAU) – Daytona Beach
- Florida Institute of Technology (Florida Tech) – Melbourne
- Florida Southern College (FSC) – Lakeland
- Rollins College – Winter Park
- Stetson University – Deland
- University of Central Florida (UCF) – Orlando

== Minor basilicas ==
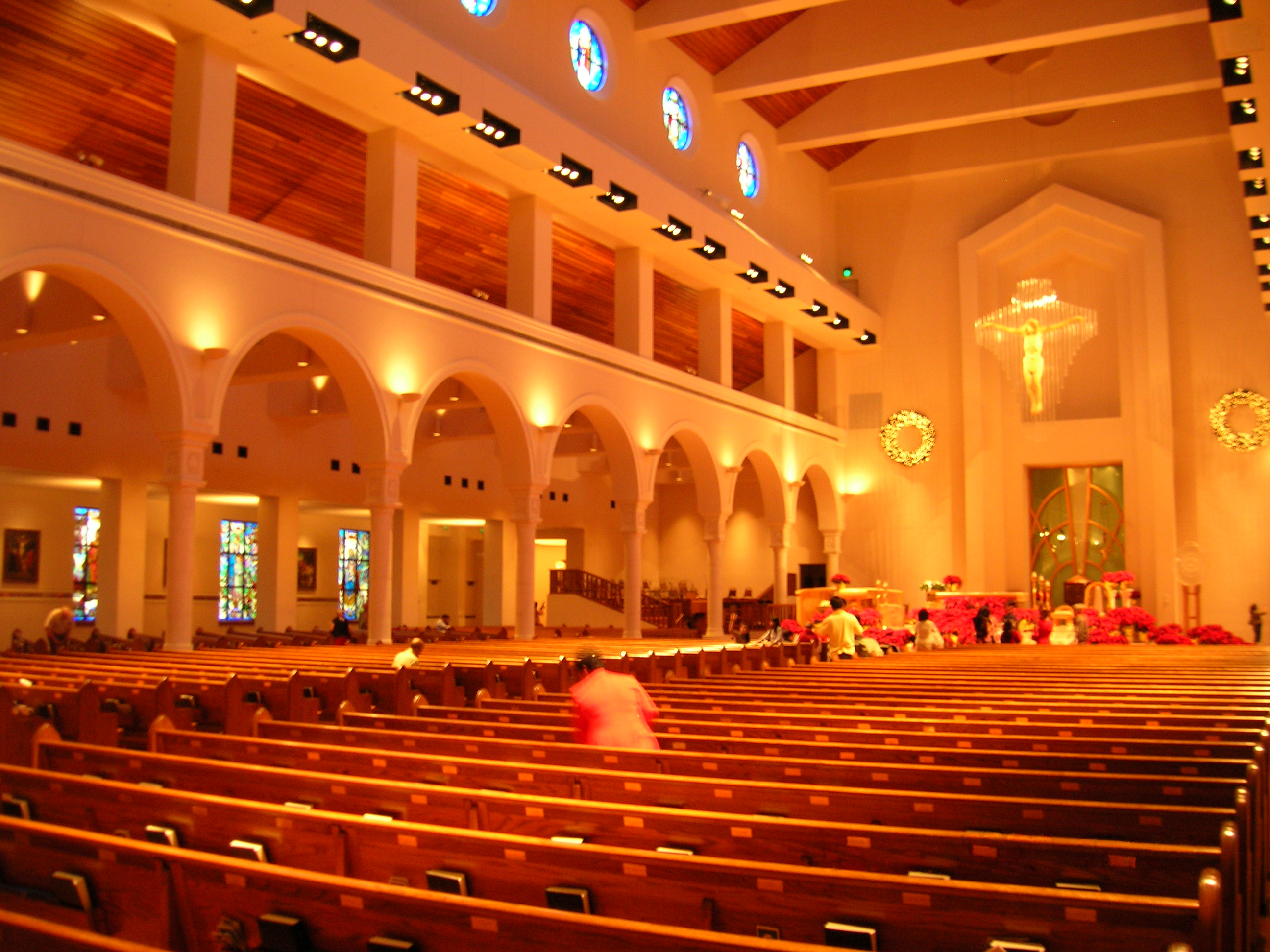
Basilica of Mary, Queen of the Universe (2006)

- Basilica of Mary, Queen of the Universe – Buena Park. Pope Benedict XVI raised it to a minor basilica in 2009.
- Basilica of St. Paul – Daytona Beach. Benedict XVI raised it to a minor basilica in 2006.

=== Other ===
- Immaculate Heart of Mary's Hermitage in West Melbourne is a hermitage with sacramental support from the Ascension Catholic Community.

== Newspaper ==
Florida Catholic newspaper is published 38 times a year.
