= USCOC =

USCOC or USCoC may refer to:

- United States Chamber of Commerce, a lobbying group
- United States Corps of Chaplains, a non-denominational Christian organization serving the American military
