= Norbert Dorsey =

American Roman Catholic prelate

His Excellency, The Most Reverend Norbert Dorsey S.P.
- Bishop of Orlando
- Church: Catholic Church
- See: Diocese of Orlando
- In office: March 20, 1990 - November 13, 2004
- Predecessor: Thomas Grady
- Successor: Thomas Wenski
- Previous posts: Auxiliary Bishop of Miami (1986–1990); Titular Bishop of Mactaris

Orders
- Ordination: April 28, 1956
- Consecration: March 19, 1986 by Edward A. McCarthy

Personal details
- Born: December 13, 1929 Springfield, Massachusetts, US
- Died: February 21, 2013 (aged 83) Orlando, Florida, US
- Coat of arms: Norbert Dorsey's coat of arms

Norbert Mary Leonard James Dorsey, C.P. (December 13, 1929 – February 21, 2013) was an American prelate of the Roman Catholic Church. He served as an auxiliary bishop of the Archdiocese of Miami in Florida (1986–1990) and as the third bishop of the Diocese of Orlando in Florida (1990–2004).

== Biography ==
=== Early life ===
Dorsey Dorsey was born in Springfield, Massachusetts, on December 13, 1929. He made profession as a member of the clerical Congregation of the Passion on August 15, 1949, when he was 19 years old.

On April 28, 1956, Dorsey was ordained a priest in that Congregation. In 1976, Dorsey was elected to the General Council of the Passionists worldwide, and re-elected in 1982.

=== Auxiliary Bishop of Miami ===
Pope John Paul II appointed Dorsey as titular bishop of Mactaris and as an auxiliary bishop of the Archdiocese of Miami on January 19, 1986, He was consecrated on March 19, 1986, with Archbishop Edward McCarthy as the principal consecrator: and as co-consecrators Bishop Joseph Maguire and Bishop Reginald Edward Vincent Arliss.

=== Bishop of Orlando ===
On March 20, 1990, Dorsey was appointed by John Paul II as the third bishop of the Diocese of Orlando. Dorsey resigned as bishop of Orlando on November 13, 2004, upon reaching 75 years of age.Norbert Dorsey died after a long battle with cancer in Orlando, Florida, aged 83.

== Awards ==
- Knight commander of the Order of the Holy Sepulchre (KCHS) for his work on behalf of Near East refugees in 1978
- Peace and Unity Award of the St. Martin Porres Association of Miami, Florida for building bridges of harmony between races and cultures, 1989
- Appreciation Award from the National Council of Christians and Jews, Interfaith Council of Miami 1990
- Founding President Award of the National Council of Christians and Jews, Orlando Chapter, 1991
- Pierre Toussaint Medallion from the Office of Black Ministry of Archdiocese of New York, presented at St. Patrick's Cathedral, New York by Cardinal John O'Connor, for special merit in the service of freedom, human rights, and spiritual values in the black community on May 5, 1996
- Appreciation Award of the Ancient Order of Hibernians (2001)

Catholic Church titles
Preceded by Thomas Joseph Grady	Bishop of Orlando; 1990–2004	Succeeded by Thomas Gerard Wenski
Preceded by –	Auxiliary Bishop of Miami; 1986–1990	Succeeded by –
