= Thomas Joseph Grady =

American prelate

His Excellency, The Most Reverend Thomas Joseph Grady
- Bishop of Orlando; Titular Bishop of Vamalla
- Church: Roman Catholic Church
- See: Diocese of Orlando
- Predecessor: William Donald Borders
- Successor: Norbert Dorsey
- Previous posts: Auxiliary Bishop of Chicago (1967 to 1974); Director, National Shrine of the Immaculate Conception (1956 to 1967)

Orders
- Ordination: April 23, 1938 by George Mundelein
- Consecration: August 24 1967 by John Cody

Personal details
- Born: October 9, 1914 Chicago, Illinois, US
- Died: April 21, 2002 (aged 87) Altamonte Springs, Florida, US
- Education: St. Mary of the Lake Seminary; Loyola University Chicago
- Motto: In Christ

Styles of Thomas Joseph Grady
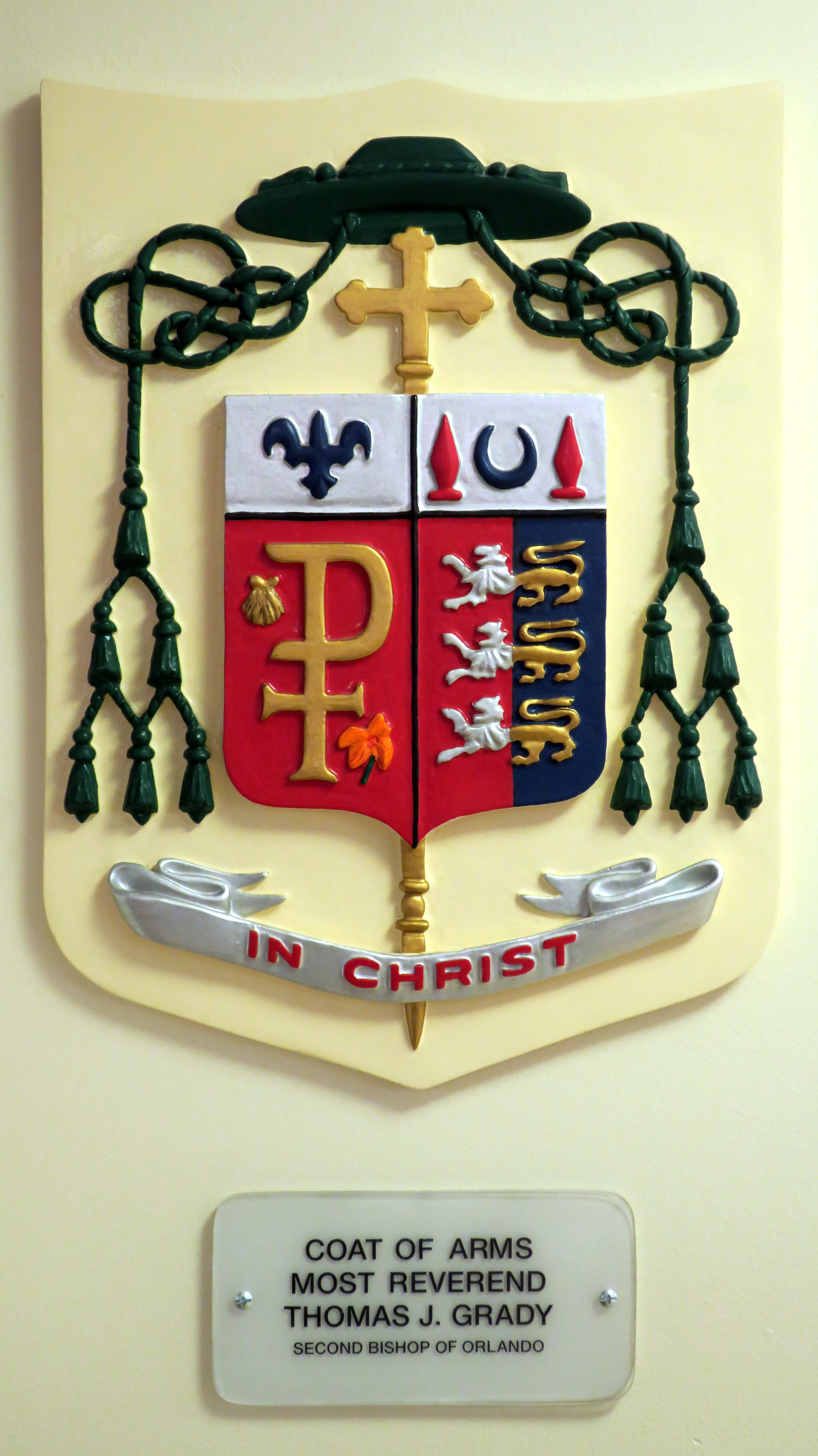
- Reference style: His Excellency; The Most Reverend
- Spoken style: Your Excellency
- Religious style: Bishop

Thomas Joseph Grady (October 9, 1914 – April 21, 2002) was an American prelate of the Roman Catholic Church. He was the second bishop of the Diocese of Orlando in Florida from 1974 to 1989, having previously served as an auxiliary bishop of the Archdiocese of Chicago in Illinois from 1967 to 1974.

== Biography ==
=== Early life and education ===
Thomas Grady was born on October 9, 1914, in Chicago, Illinois, the son of a police captain, Michael Grady, who twice arrested Al Capone. He attended Archbishop Quigley Preparatory Seminary in Chicago and St. Mary of the Lake Seminary in Mundelein, Illinois.

=== Ordination and ministry ===
On April 23, 1938, Grady was ordained to the priesthood for the Archdiocese of Chicago by Cardinal George Mundelein. Grady studied in Rome for a year before returning to Chicago. He earned a Master of Arts degree in English from Loyola University Chicago in 1944. Grady then taught at Archbishop Quigley and later joined the faculty of St. Mary of the Lake, serving as procurator.

In 1956, Grady was appointed director of the National Shrine of the Immaculate Conception in Washington, D.C., the largest Catholic church in the United States. As director, Grady oversaw a period of massive construction for the church, assuming his position just as building resumed after a 20-year hiatus. He worked with builders and architects to oversee the cladding of its interior and exterior with limestone and marble, the addition of 26 side chapels, the completion of the "Christ in Majesty" mosaic, the installation of a massive pipe organ, and a 56-bell carillon. Shortly after the 1963 assassination of US President John F. Kennedy, Grady celebrated a mass for US President Lyndon B. Johnson using a gold and bejeweled "Texas chalice".

=== Auxiliary Bishop of Chicago ===
On June 21, 1967, Grady was appointed auxiliary bishop of Chicago and titular bishop of Vamalla by Pope Paul VI. He received his episcopal consecration at Holy Name Cathedral in Chicago on August 24, 1967, from Cardinal John Cody, with Bishops Cletus F. O'Donnell and Aloysius John Wycislo serving as co-consecrators. As an auxiliary bishop, he served as vicar general of the archdiocese, started the permanent diaconate program, and headed the Archdiocesan Liturgy Committee.

=== Bishop of Orlando ===
Following the transfer of Bishop William Borders to the Archdiocese of Baltimore, Grady was appointed the second bishop of Orlando by Paul VI on November 11, 1974. He was installed on December 16 of that year.

During his 15-year tenure in Orlando, Grady guided the diocese through a period of significant growth. He oversaw the establishment 18 new parishes, a tourism ministry, the San Pedro Spiritual Development Center on the shores of Lake Howell, and a Mission Office to forge a relationship with a sister diocese. This sister diocese is the Diocese of San Juan de la Maguana in the Dominican Republic. He expanded ministries to migrants and minorities, founded a scholarship program for African American students, and helped develop apartment buildings for the elderly. He also wrote a weekly column called "The Bishop's Corner" for the Florida Catholic weekly newspaper.

=== Retirement and death ===
After reaching the mandatory retirement age of 75, Grady resigned as bishop of Orlando on December 12, 1989. He died from kidney disease at his home in Altamonte Springs, Florida, at age 87 on April 21, 2002.

== Awards and honors ==
The Guild of Carillonneurs in North America awarded Grady honorary membership in 1964.

== Episcopal succession ==
Catholic Church titles
Preceded by William Donald Borders	Bishop of Orlando; 1974–1989	Succeeded by Norbert Dorsey
