= Fachtna Joseph Harte =

Irish Catholic priest (1930–2020)

Monsignor Fachtna Joseph Harte (1930-2020), was an Irish Catholic priest, who served in Washington and Orlando, and founded the Basilica of Mary, Queen of the Universe, the national shrine in Florida.

Born in 1930 in County Mayo, in Ireland. Educated at St. Gerald’s Secondary School in Castlebar and St. Mary’s Secondary School in Athlone, he trained as Teacher in De La Salle College Waterford and joined the Marist Teaching order which i left in 1955 to become a priest training first in Mound Melleray Seminary Co. Waterford and at the foreign missionary college All Hallows College, Dublin. He was ordained for the priesthood in All Hallows College, Dublin in 1961, working first in Diocese of Yakima, Washington State where he worked as a priest and school teacher then being transferred to the Diocese of Orlando. He gained a masters in education from the University of Portland, and later a Masters in Religious Education from Barry University, Miami.

He was honoured with the title Monsignor, chaplain to his holiness in 2003, and retired in 2007.

His book They Shall Bear You Up - Memories of a Catholic Priest, was published in 2011. Monsignor Harte's, Flames at Twilight: The Novel of St. Patrick and Ireland was published in 2018 by Archway Publishing.

He died on 30 May 2020, and his body was returned to Ireland where he is buried.
