= Florida Catholic =

Catholic newspaper based in Florida

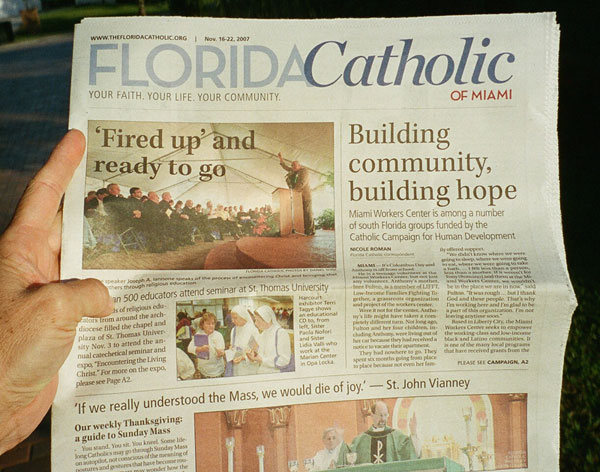
- The Florida Catholic newspaper, Miami Archdiocese edition
- Type: Orlando, Palm Beach and Venice dioceses editions: 24 times a year. Miami Archdiocese: 12 times a year newspaper
- Owner: Roman Catholic Ecclesiastical Province of Miami
- Publisher: Bishop Gerald Barbarito of Palm Beach; Bishop John Gerard Noonan of Orlando; Bishop Frank Joseph Dewane of Venice
- Founded: 1939
- Language: English
- Headquarters: Orlando, Florida
- Price: $26 per year
- ISSN: 0746-4584
- Website: www.thefloridacatholic.org

The Florida Catholic is the official newspaper for four of the seven dioceses in the Catholic Ecclesiastical Province of Miami. Based in Orlando, Florida, the newspaper publishes 48digital issues a year in three dioceses; these editions include local, state, national and International Catholic news. The Miami Archdiocese and the Palm Beach Diocese editions are also published/printed once a month with local content.

Other articles discuss faith issues and highlight specific schools, ministries or parish activities. The bishop of each Florida diocese offers a personal message to subscribers in their diocese on current events or faith subjects. A weekly online version of the newspaper (e-edition) offers the most recent edition as well as an archive of past articles and bishops' messages.

== History ==
The paper was first published as a weekly in Miami in 1939. It moved to St. Augustine in 1942. It moved to Orlando about 1952. In 1958, it was replaced in the Miami Archdiocese by The Voice, for the next 32 years.

In 1959, the paper moved to the Orlando suburb of Winter Park.

In 1972, the paper changed its format from broadsheet to tabloid.

In 1984, the Diocese of Pensacola-Tallahassee began publishing their own version of the newspaper.

In 1990, the Florida Catholic absorbed The Voice published by the Archdiocese of Miami and began serving that area. The addition of Miami gave the paper a circulation of 140,000, serving six out of the seven dioceses in the state.

In 1993, specific local sections were generated for each diocese.

In 2003, it was discovered that a bookkeeper had embezzled money totaling a large sum over decades. The bookkeeper was charged with grand theft and the editor felt obliged to resign. This resulted in an abbreviated publishing schedule for several years until losses could be recouped.

In 2004, the Catholic Press Association selected the paper to receive the Bishop John England Award for First Amendment rights, freedom of the press and/or freedom of religion.

In 2008, the paper was published for the final time in the St. Petersburg Diocese. It began production of a new publication for that diocese, Gathered, Nourished, Sent.

In 2012, the paper added a digital e-Edition subscription which combines content from three dioceses (Orlando, Palm Beach and Venice), and began a social media presence on Facebook, Instagram, Twitter, and YouTube.

== Associate Publisher ==
1. Father Vincent Smith ?-1965
2. Father David Page 1965-1990
3. Henry Libersat 1990-1999
4. Steven Paradis 1999-2003
5. Christopher Gunty 2003–2008
6. Denise O'Toole Kelly 2008-2009
7. Mary St. Pierre 2009–2010
8. Ann Borowski-Slade 2008–Present
