= Basilica of Mary, Queen of the Universe =

Roman Catholic basilica in Orlando, Florida, US

Basilica of the National Shrine of Mary, Queen of the Universe
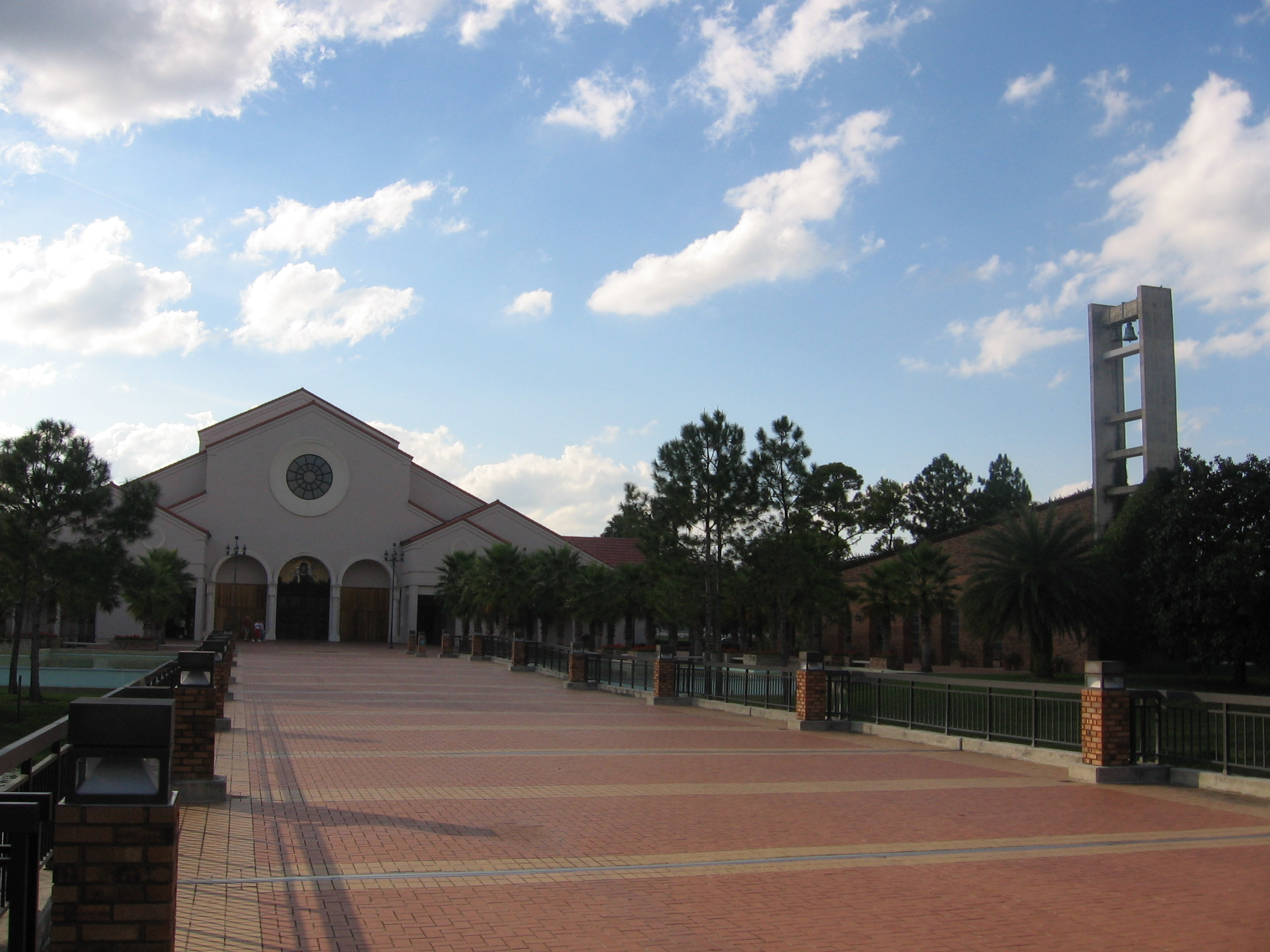

Religion
- Affiliation: Catholic Church (Latin Church)
- Ecclesiastical or organizational status: Minor Basilica, National Shrine
- Leadership: Fr. Ivan Olmo, Rector

Location
- Location: 8300 Vineland Avenue; Orlando, Florida
- State: Florida
- Interactive map of Basilica of the National Shrine of Mary, Queen of the Universe
- Coordinates: 28.384840°N 81.496521°W

Architecture
- Architect: RLF Architects
- Groundbreaking: 1990
- Completed: 1993
- Capacity: 3,800

Website
- www.mqus.org

The Basilica of the National Shrine of Mary, Queen of the Universe is a basilica located in Orlando, Florida at 8300 Vineland Avenue. It was built to service the large number of Catholic tourists who visit the attractions in the Greater Orlando area. While it is a 2,000-seat church of the Diocese of Orlando and provides Mass for the faithful, it has also become a regional tourist attraction. In 2009, it was designated as the 63rd minor basilica in the United States. Since it is not a parish church, only the Sacraments of Reconciliation and the Holy Eucharist are celebrated there.

The Shrine consists of the main church, the Rosary Garden, the Mother and Child Outdoor Chapel, the Blessed Sacrament Chapel, the Shrine Museum, and a gift shop.

== History ==
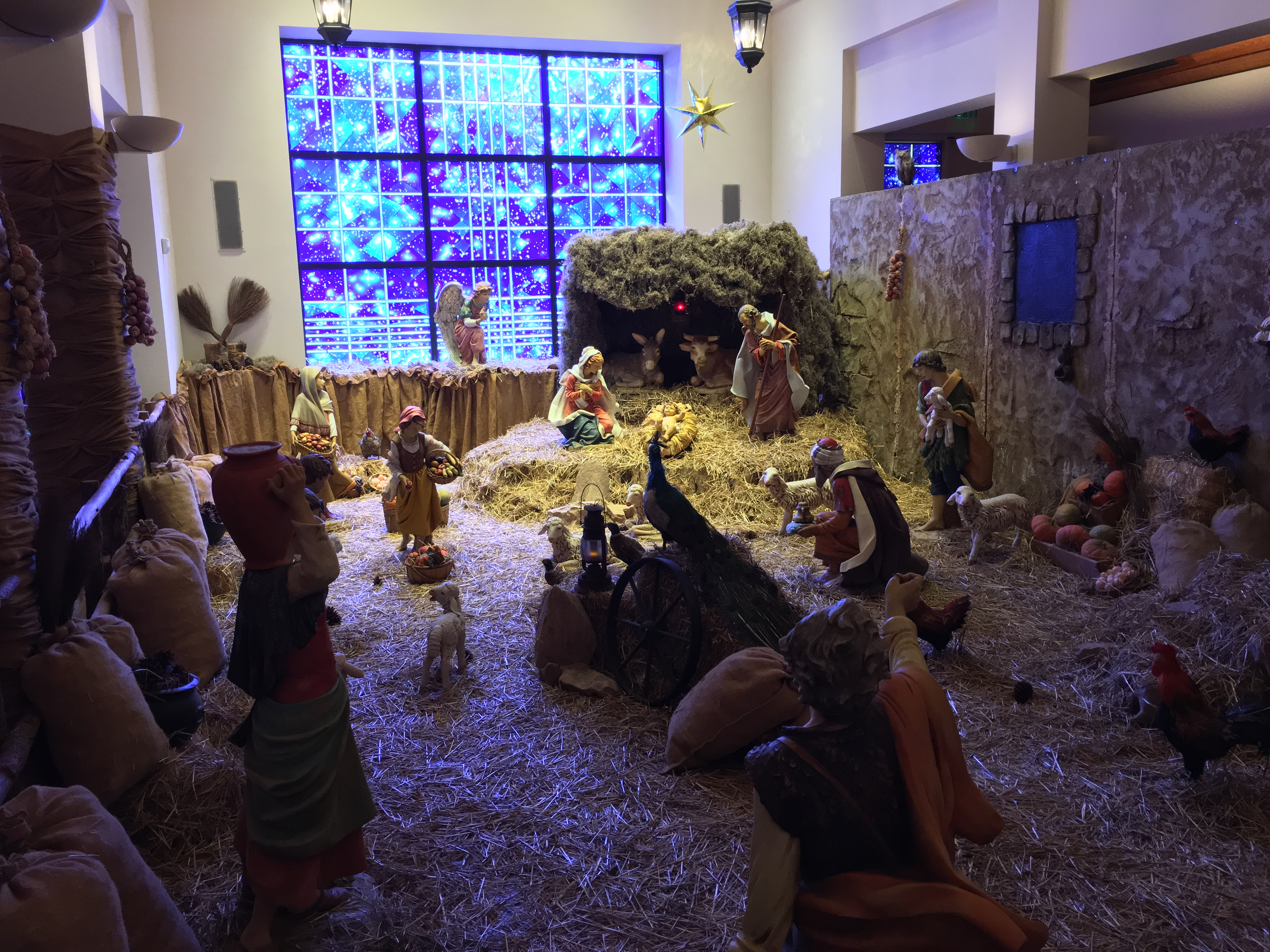
Nativity scene in the side chapel (December 2015)

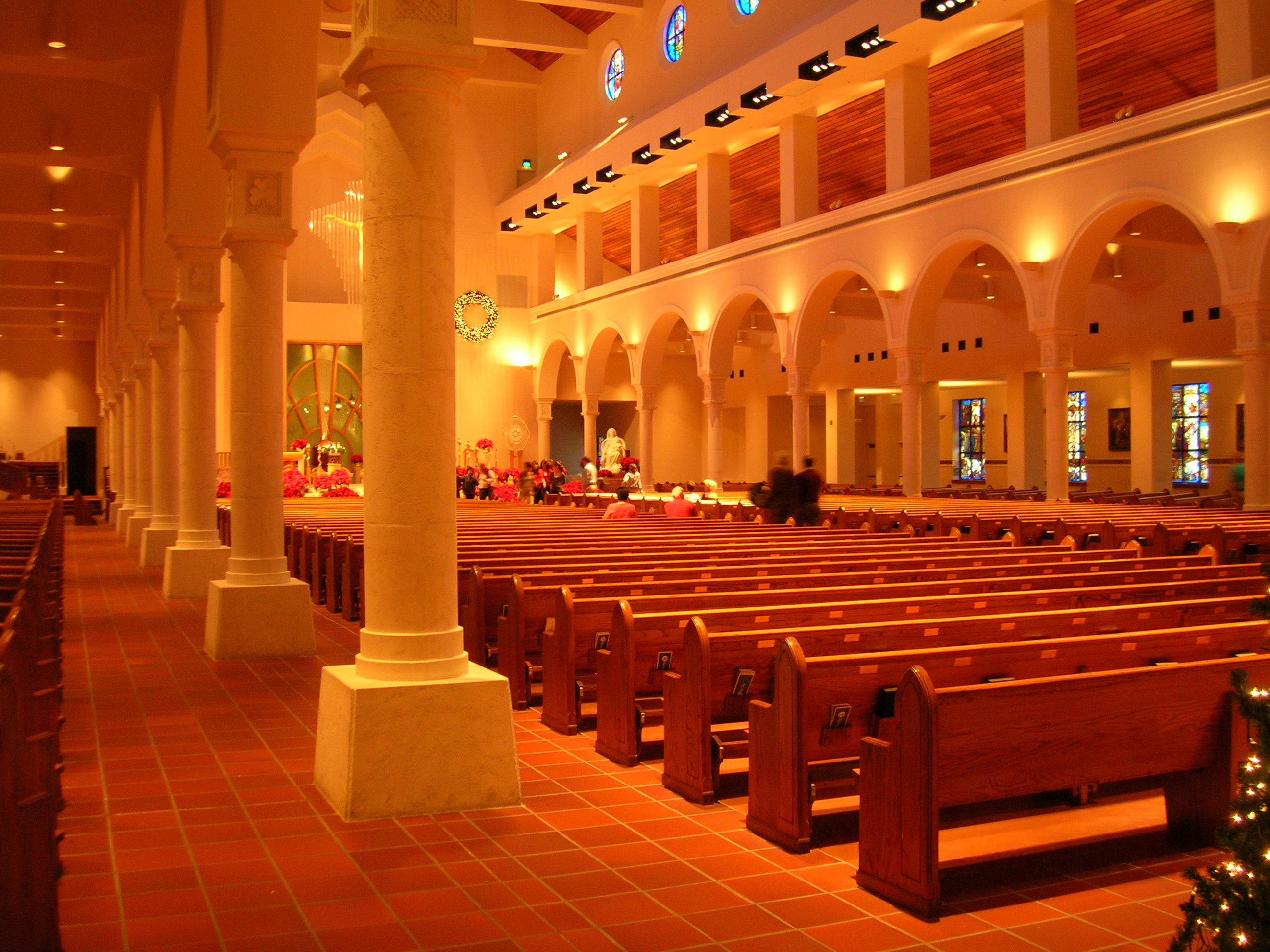
The inside of the shrine with Christmas decorations.

After the grand opening of Walt Disney World in Lake Buena Vista, Florida, the Diocese of Orlando determined that the thousands of Catholics visiting from around the world needed a place to attend Mass. The Diocese arranged for Masses at several area hotels, and in the spring of 1975 Bishop Thomas Grady placed Father Fachtna Joseph Harte in charge of tourism ministry. With projections predicting over 30 million annual visitors to Greater Orlando in the 1970s, Fr. Harte and Bishop Grady worked to establish a permanent location. In 1979, property was purchased for a new facility, named under the patronage of the Virgin Mary.

On December 8, 1984, the Feast of the Immaculate Conception, enough funds had been raised to break ground for the first phase of construction. Within two years, the initial facility was completed and on November 23, 1986, the Feast of Christ the King, the first phase was blessed by Archbishop Pio Laghi, Papal Nuncio to the United States. Phase one included landscaping, a building to use as a church and offices, and a bell tower.

On August 22, 1990, the Feast of the Queenship of the Blessed Virgin Mary, ground was broken for a main church that would seat as many as 2,000 people. “We want the shrine to be a temple, a sacred place to give glory to God and honor our mother,” said Bishop Norbert Dorsey. “Above all we want it to be a spiritual home, a real hearth.” A plaque in front of the church honors this 1990 dedication.

At long last, on January 31, 1993, the first Mass was celebrated in the new church, and on August 22, 1993, the church was dedicated. Archbishop Pio Laghi was once again present. Bishop Dorsey proclaimed “a day of great rejoicing” and asked God’s grace upon all who would be drawn to the Shrine.

The use of the title "Mary, Queen of the Universe" is drawn from section 59 of Lumen gentium, the Dogmatic Constitution on the Church issued in 1964 by the Second Vatican Council, which stated: "Finally, the Immaculate Virgin, preserved free from all guilt of original sin, on the completion of her earthly sojourn, was taken up body and soul into heavenly glory, and exalted by the Lord as Queen of the universe, that she might be the more fully conformed to her Son, the Lord of lords and the conqueror of sin and death." This usage could reflect Orlando's connection to nearby Cape Canaveral, the liftoff point for America's crewed space program, as spaceflight was likely the inspiration for the term. Cape Canaveral is part of the Diocese of Orlando.

In 2004, Archbishop Thomas Wenski petitioned the USCCB to ask for the Shrine to be elevated from a diocesan to a National Shrine. The petition was granted and “National” was added to the name.

The National Conference of Catholic Bishops held their spring convocation there in 2008. On July 17, 2009, Pope Benedict XVI declared the Shrine a minor basilica because of its ministry to the estimated half million pilgrims and tourists.

== Facts ==
- The fourteen aisle windows are entitled "The Magnificat Windows"
- It also ministers to Catholic workers at Walt Disney World, Universal Orlando Resort and SeaWorld Orlando.
- It is the nearest Catholic church to Walt Disney World.
- The Outdoor Chapel features a bronze sculpture of the Mother and Child by Jerzy Kenar
- The Museum displays Church art from around the world
- The Shrine contains an 8-foot-tall (2.4 m) sculpture featuring Mary and Baby Jesus bearing the same name "Mary, Queen of the Universe" sculpted by Jill Burkee of white marble from Carrara, Italy.
- In 2015, Bishop John Noonan designated the central door as a Holy Door as part of the celebration of the Extraordinary Jubilee of Mercy, and opened it on December 13.
- There is a cast iron statue of Mary and Jesus in the basilica courtyard known as the Salve Regina statue, which was designed in Germany and created in 1875. It stood near a convent close to Utrecht in Holland for over 100 years and was purchased for the basilica in 1992.

== Gallery ==
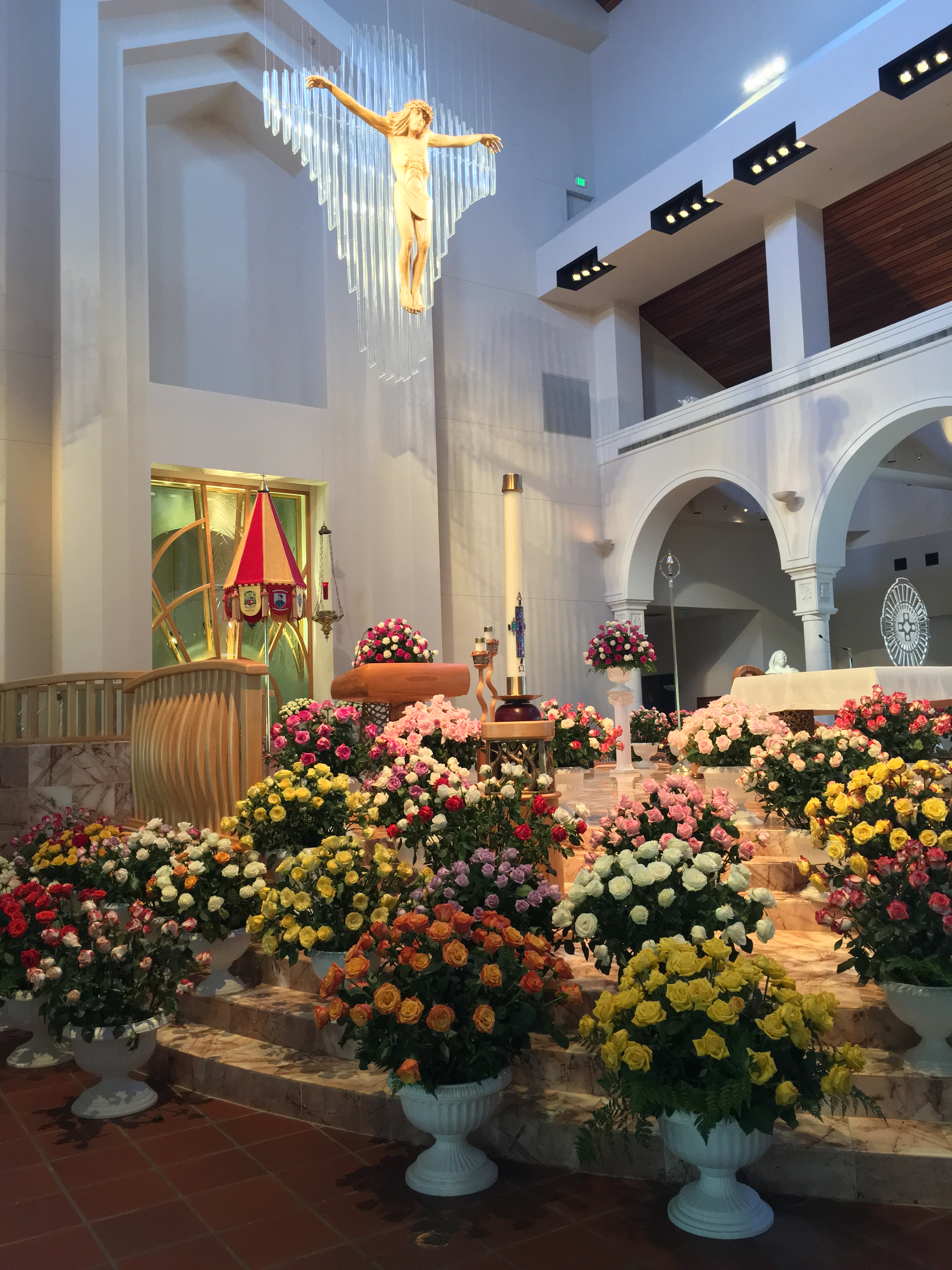
The altar area during the month of May, Mary is the Queen of May. Symbols of its designation as a Minor basilica can be seen, Umbraculum (left) and Tintinnabulum (right).

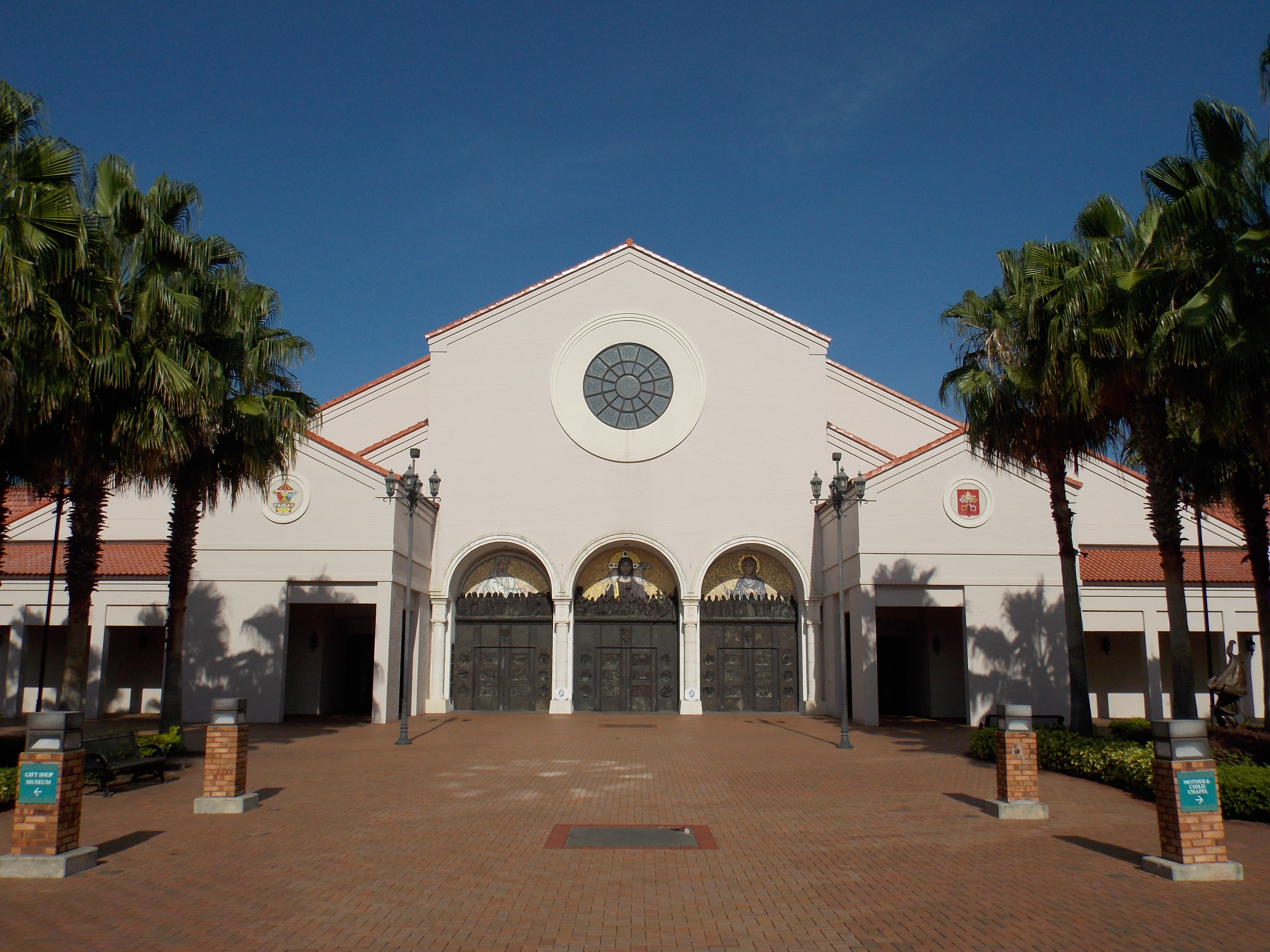
Main facade

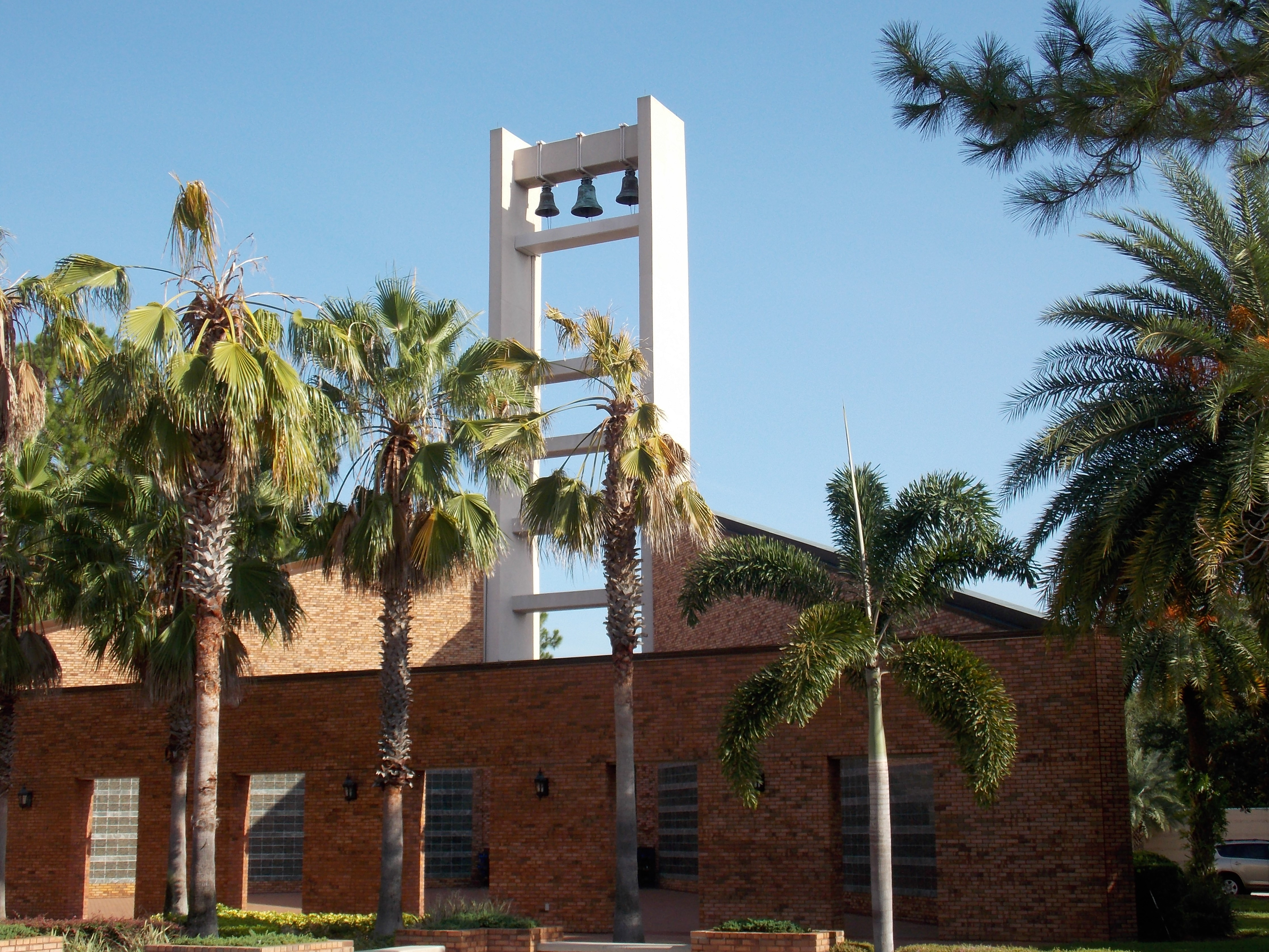
Bell tower

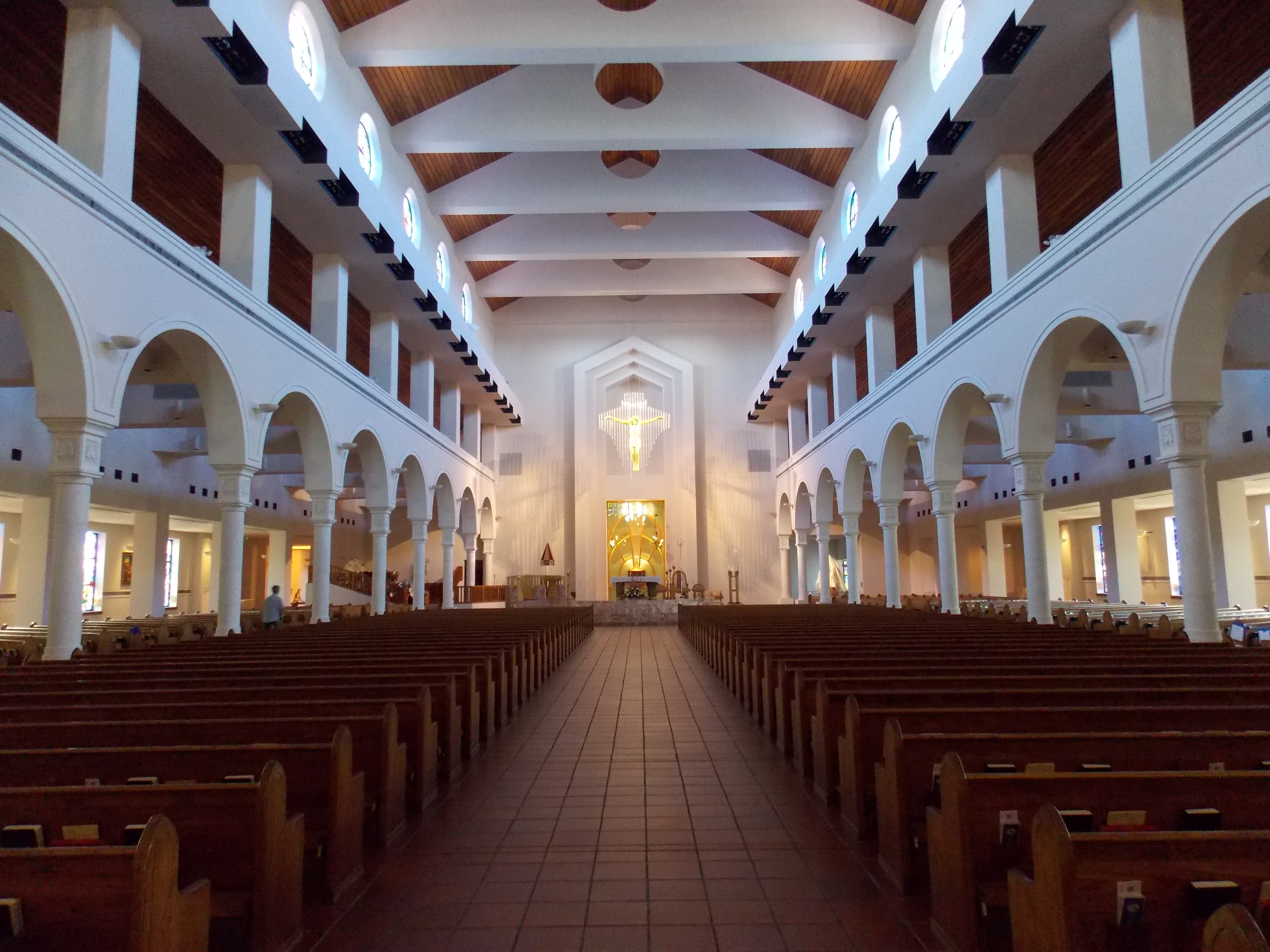
The nave

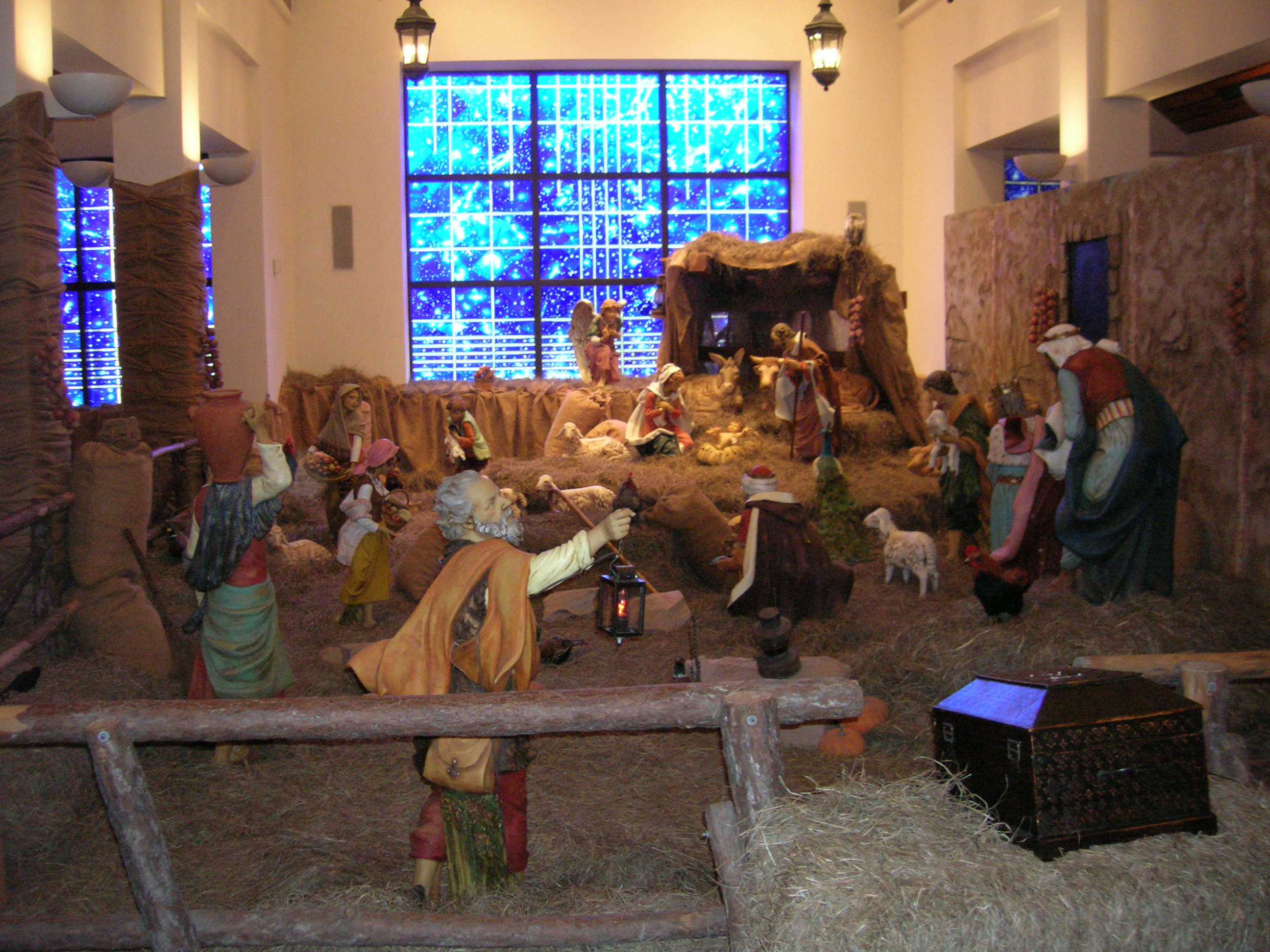
The Christmas Nativity

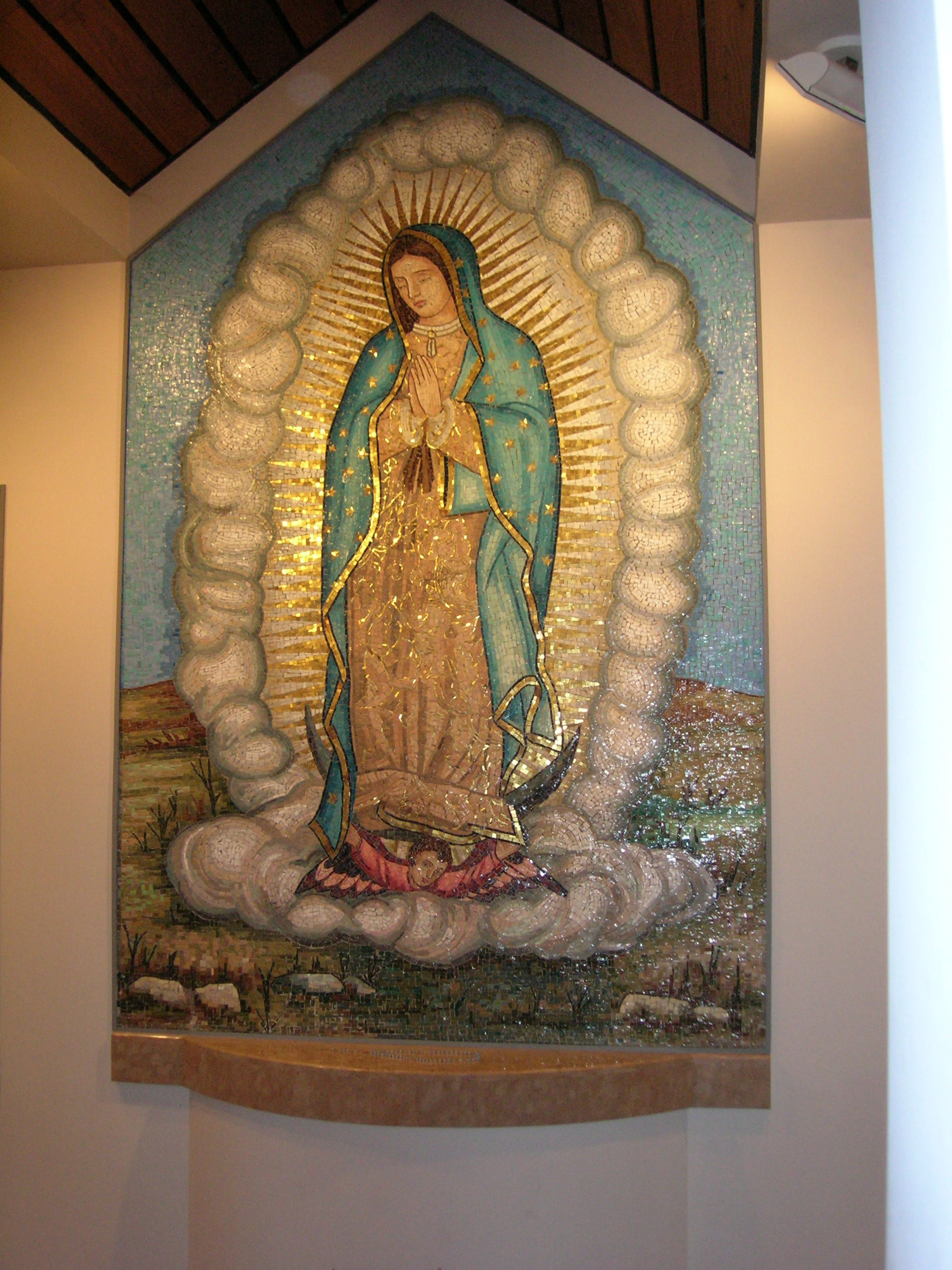
A mosaic of Our Lady of Guadalupe

A statue of the Virgin Mary and Baby Jesus

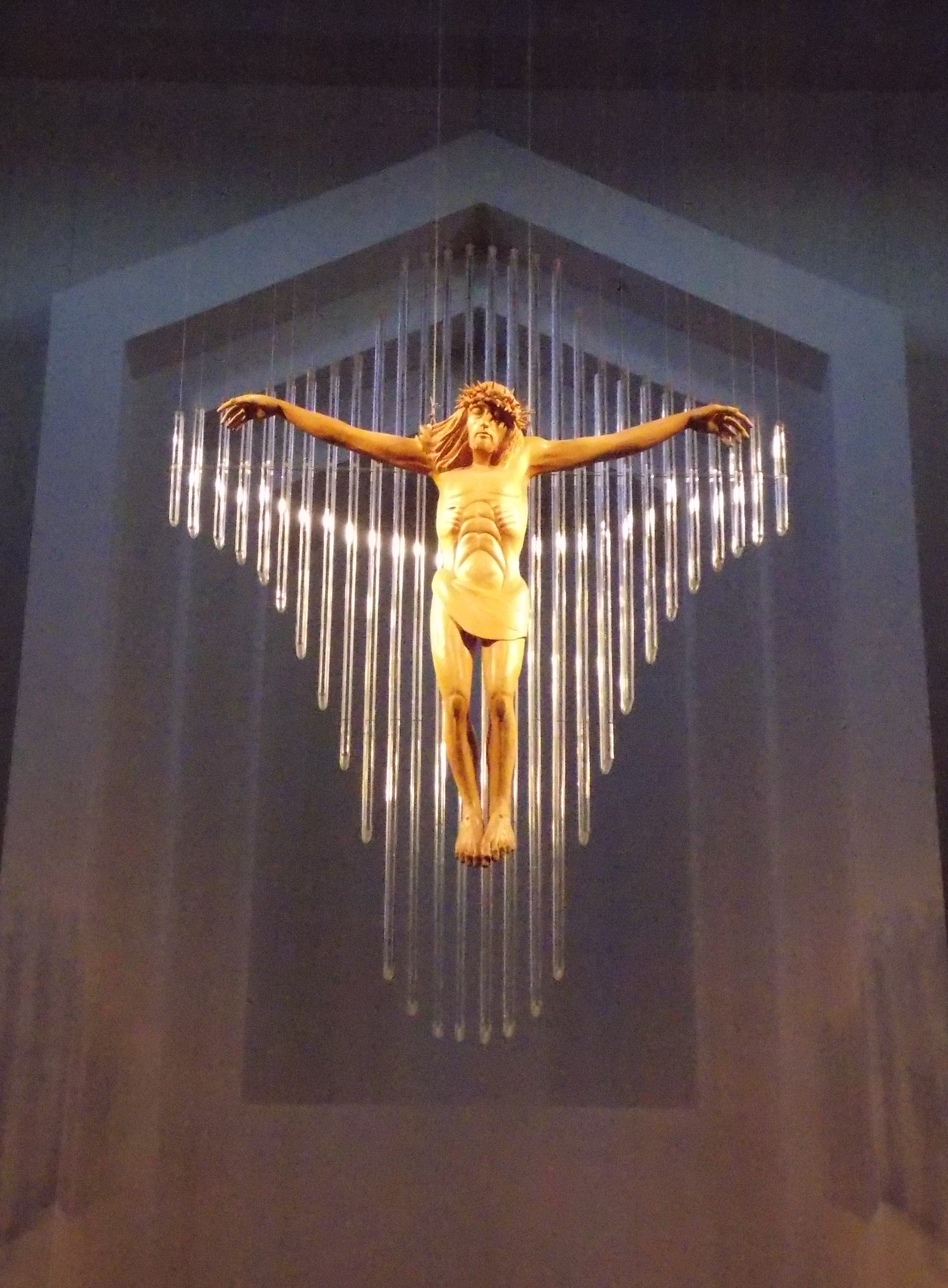
The Crucifix above the high altar
