= United States Corps of Chaplains =

The United States Corps Of Chaplains is a non-denominational Christian organization which provides ministerial assistance and other aid to active-duty military members, veterans, and their family members. The USCOC is also active in disaster-response activities, providing a needed and appreciated ministerial presence. Members of the USCOC wear distinctive uniforms and use ranks and unit designations similar to those of the U.S. Army. However, the USCOC is not an entity of, nor endorsed by, any branch of the military services or the United States government. The United States Corps Of Chaplains is governed by a board of directors, with the chairman of the board also holding the office of national commander.

This group seeks to spread the Gospel of Jesus Christ and to help those in need through various outreach projects across the US conducted by volunteers.
