= John Gerard Noonan =

American Catholic prelate (born 1951)

His Excellency, The Most Reverend John Gerard Noonan
- Bishop of Orlando
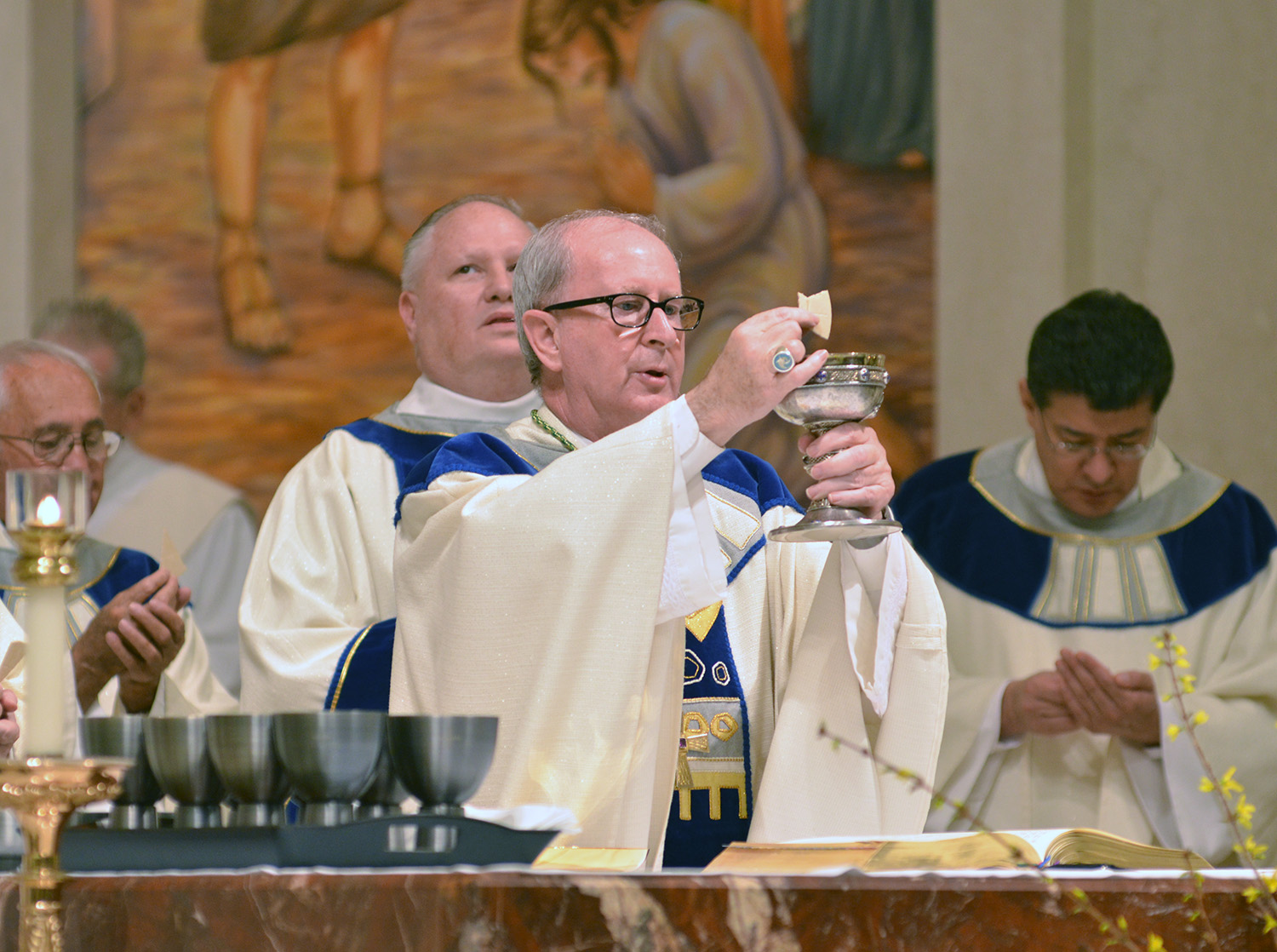
- Noonan in 2012, while celebrating Mass at St. James Cathedral
- Church: Catholic
- Province: Miami
- Diocese: Orlando
- Appointed: October 23, 2010
- Installed: December 16, 2010
- Predecessor: Thomas Wenski
- Previous post: Auxiliary Bishop of Miami and Titular Bishop of Bonusta (2005-2010)

Orders
- Ordination: September 23, 1983 by Edward Anthony McCarthy
- Consecration: August 24, 2005 by John Favalora, Agustin Roman, Felipe de Jesús Estévez

Personal details
- Born: February 26, 1951 (age 75) Limerick, Ireland
- Education: St. John Vianney College Seminary; St. Vincent de Paul Regional Seminary; Boston College
- Motto: God before me and God with me
- Styles
- Reference style: His Excellency; The Most Reverend
- Spoken style: Your Excellency
- Religious style: Bishop

John Gerard Noonan (born February 26, 1951) is an Irish-born American Catholic prelate serving as Bishop of Orlando in Florida since 2010. Noonan previously served as an auxiliary bishop of the Archdiocese of Miami in Florida from 2005 to 2010.

== Biography ==
=== Early life ===
Noonan was born in Limerick, Ireland, on February 26, 1951. His parents were John Noonan and Margaret Purcell. At age 18, John Noonan immigrated from Ireland to New York but later moved to Miami, Florida. In 1979, Noonan graduated from St. John Vianney College Seminary, with a Bachelor of Arts degree. In 1983, he earned a Master of Divinity degree from St. Vincent de Paul Regional Seminary in Boynton Beach.

=== Ordination and ministry ===
On September 23, 1983, Noonan was ordained a priest by Archbishop Edward McCarthy for the Archdiocese of Miami at St. Paul of the Cross Church in North Palm Beach.

After his ordination, the archdiocese assigned Noonan as parochial vicar at St. Elizabeth of Hungary Parish in Pompano Beach, (1983–1989) while also serving as the chaplain for youth ministry in Broward County (1985–1987).

Noonan was appointed dean of men at St. John Vianney (1989–1993), then priest in residence at St. Rose of Lima Parish in Miami Shores (1993–1994). Noonan next became supervising principal at Monsignor Edward Pace High School in Miami Gardens, (1993–1994) and then supervising principal at St. Brendan High School in Miami (1994–1996). In 1996, Noonan earned a Master of Education degree from Boston College in Boston, Massachusetts. Noonan served as rector/president of St. John Vianney from 1996 until 2005.

=== Auxiliary Bishop of Miami ===
On June 21, 2005, Noonan was appointed titular bishop of Bonusta and auxiliary bishop of the Archdiocese of Miami by Pope Benedict XVI. On August 24, 2005, he was consecrated at the Cathedral of Saint Mary in Miami. Noonan's principal consecrator was Archbishop John Favalora and his co-consecrators were Auxiliary Bishop Agustin Alejo Roman and Bishop Felipe de Jesús Estévez.

=== Bishop of Orlando ===
On October 23, 2010, Benedict XVI appointed Noonan as the fifth bishop of Orlando. He was installed at the Basilica of Mary, Queen of the Universe in Orlando on December 16, 2010. On August 13, 2014, an Orlando man filed a lawsuit against Noonan and the diocese. The plaintiff claimed to have been sexually assaulted when he was an altar boy in Sanford by William Authenrieth between 1976 and 1978. On June 15, 2017, Noonan attended a memorial service at St. James Cathedral in Orlando for the victims of the 2016 Pulse nightclub shooting in that city. He made these remarks:

"We need to walk with and accompany everybody — there is no exception, We treat everybody with dignity because they are made in the image and likeness of God and that's what it's all about."

On August 30, 2018, Noonan removed David Gillis, parochial administrator of the Our Savior Parish in Cocoa Beach. Gillis had been accused in a Pennsylvania investigation of sexual abuse of a minor years earlier.

== Episcopal succession ==
Catholic Church titles
Preceded by –	Auxiliary Bishop of Miami; 2005–2010	Succeeded by –
Preceded by Thomas Wenski	Bishop of Orlando; 2010–Present	Succeeded by Incumbent
