= Joseph Keith Symons =

American Roman Catholic Bishop (resigned 1998)

His Excellency, The Most Reverend Joseph Keith Symons
- Bishop Emeritus of Palm Beach
- Diocese: Palm Beach
- Appointed: June 12, 1990
- Installed: July 31, 1990
- Retired: June 2, 1998
- Predecessor: Thomas Vose Daily
- Successor: Anthony O'Connell
- Previous posts: Bishop of Pensacola-Tallahassee (1983-1990); Auxiliary Bishop of St. Petersburg and Titular Bishop of Sigus (1981-1983)

Orders
- Ordination: May 18, 1958 by Joseph Patrick Hurley
- Consecration: March 19, 1981 by William Thomas Larkin, Edward A. McCarthy, and Thomas Joseph McDonough

Personal details
- Born: October 14, 1932 (age 93) Champion, Michigan US
- Education: St. Thomas Seminary; St. Mary's Seminary
- Motto: With joyful trust

Styles of Joseph Keith Symons
- Reference style: His Excellency; The Most Reverend
- Spoken style: Your Excellency
- Religious style: Bishop

Joseph Keith Symons (born October 14, 1932) is an American prelate of the Roman Catholic Church. Symons served as bishop of the Diocese of Palm Beach in Florida from 1990 to 1998. Previously, he served as an auxiliary bishop of the Diocese of St. Petersburg in Florida for several months in 1981, then was appointed bishop of the Diocese of Pensacola-Tallahassee in Florida in October 1981.

In 1998, Symons tendered his resignation as bishop of the Diocese of Palm Beach to Pope John Paul II, after publicly admitting that he had sexually abused five boys earlier in his career. Symons then became the first US Catholic bishop to lose his position over the sexual abuse of minors. His successor as bishop of Palm Beach, Anthony O'Connell, was also forced to resign in 2002 after admitting to sexually abusing underage boys.

== Early life ==
Joseph Keith Symons was born in Champion Township, Michigan, on October 14, 1932. The family moved to Miami, Florida in 1945, where Symons graduated from Sts. Peter & Paul High School in 1949. He then studied for the priesthood at St. Thomas Seminary, in Bloomfield, Connecticut, and St. Mary's Seminary, also known as the "Pink Palace," in Baltimore, Maryland. At St. Mary's, Symons received a Bachelor of Arts degree in 1954 and a Bachelor of Sacred Theology in 1956.

== Priesthood ==
Symons was ordained a priest in Miami by Archbishop Joseph Hurley for the Diocese of St. Augustine on May 18, 1958. In 1968, he was transferred to the newly established Diocese of St. Petersburg, and in 1971 he was appointed as its chancellor.

== Auxiliary Bishop of St. Petersburg ==
On January 16, 1981, John Paul II appointed Symons as auxiliary bishop of St. Petersburg, with the titular see of Sigus. He was consecrated at the Cathedral of St. Jude the Apostle in St. Petersburg by Bishop William Larkin on March 19, 1981. Archbishops Edward McCarthy and Thomas Joseph McDonough were the co-consecrators.

== Bishop of Pensacola-Tallahassee ==
On October 4, 1983, John Paul II appointed Symons as the second bishop of Pensacola-Tallahassee. He was installed on November 8, 1983. Symons served for seven years at the head of that diocese, becoming known for his frequent visits to parishes and schools throughout the Florida panhandle.

== Bishop of Palm Beach ==
On June 12, 1990, John Paul II appointed Symons as the second bishop of Palm Beach. He was installed on July 31, 1990. Symons served as a member of the Committee for Latin America of the US Conference of Catholic Bishops. He also was a member of the Southeast Pastoral Institute in Miami, which provides outreach to Hispanics.

In 1991, Symons authorized the taping of an exorcism. The rite was performed by Reverend James J. LeBar and other priests on a 16-year-old girl identified as "Gina". Footage of the exorcism was then broadcast on ABC's 20/20 TV program. In allowing the taping, Symons said that he hoped it would help "counteract diabolical activities around us."

In 1996, a married couple charged that years earlier Symons, when serving as auxiliary bishop of St. Petersburg, had ignored their report that a priest of the diocese had abused their children. The couple claimed that Symons then tried to bribe them by offering to pay for therapy for their sons. Symons said he had the priest submit to a psychiatric evaluation.

In April 1998, a 53 year old man informed a priest and John Favalora, the Archbishop of Miami, that Symons had sexually abused him when he was an altar server decades earlier. When confronted with the allegations, Symons admitted his guilt. The Vatican immediately asked Bishop Robert Nugent Lynch of St. Petersburg to question Symons. During that session, Symons admitted that he had abused four other boys. He also said that he had confessed the abuses to a priest at the time, but the priest simply told Symons to avoid alcohol and remain chaste. According to Lynch, the molestations all took place in the Diocese of Pensacola-Tallahassee.

== Resignation and legacy ==
On June 2, 1998, Lynch announced that John Paul II had accepted Symons' resignation as bishop of Palm Beach and named Lynch as apostolic administrator of the diocese.Symons issued a written statement that said, in part,

As painful as it is for me and will be for others, I feel it important to make public the reason for my resignation. Early in my 40 years of priestly ministry, I was involved in inappropriate sexual behavior with minors. Realizing the gravity of my past actions, I have in succeeding years tried to live my promises of celibacy and chastity and have immersed myself in my ministry as priest and as bishop.... I have prayed each day for these persons and their families. It is a memory with which we have lived far too long. I apologize to all whom I have hurt in any way and if, by this action, they might seek spiritual, emotional, and psychological comfort and assistance, then this painful moment for the Church and me may prove to be beneficial.

After his resignation, Symons was to be sent away for treatment and counseling. On July 30, 1998, the St. Petersburg Times reported that Symons’ accuser had first complained to the church about Symons in 1995. John M. Smith, then bishop of Pensacola-Tallahassee, brokered a meeting between Symons and his accuser. In the meeting, Symons admitted his guilt. However, he denied molesting other youths (which he admitting doing later in 1998) and promised to get counseling, which he never did until after his resignation.

After his departure from Palm Beach, Symons retired to his native Michigan. There he leads spiritual retreats for adults with the permission of the Diocese of Lansing.

Catholic Church titles
Preceded by Thomas Vose Daily	Bishop of Palm Beach; 1990–1998	Succeeded by Anthony O'Connell
Preceded by René Henry Gracida	Bishop of Pensacola-Tallahassee; 1983–1990	Succeeded by John Mortimer Smith
Preceded by -	Auxiliary Bishop of St. Petersburg; 1981–1983	Succeeded by -
