= Tampa Catholic High School =

Location
- 4630 North Rome Avenue; Tampa, Hillsborough, Florida 33603; United States; 27°59′8″N 82°28′32″W

Information
- Type: Private, college-prep
- Motto: Veritas et Caritas (Truth and Charity)
- Religious affiliation: Roman Catholic
- Patron saint: Blessed Edmund Rice
- Established: 4 September 1962
- Founder: Msgr. John F. Scully
- Oversight: Diocese of Saint Petersburg
- Dean: Claire Harpool (Dean of Student Life)
- Principal: Robert Lees
- Chaplain: Fr. Elixavier Castro and Br. Chris Burns (Director of Campus Ministry)
- Faculty: 60
- Grades: 9–12
- Gender: Co-ed
  - Grade 9: 197
  - Grade 10: 194
  - Grade 11: 182
  - Grade 12: 191
- Average class size: 22–30
- Student to teacher ratio: Student Teacher Ratio of 14.8:1
- Campus: Urban
- Campus size: 40 acres (160,000 m^{2})
- Colors: Green & white
- Athletics: 20+ Sports Teams
- Mascot: Crusader
- Team name: Crusaders
- Rival: Jesuit High; Berkeley Prep; Clearwater Central Catholic
- Accreditation: Southern Association of Colleges and Schools
- School fees: $600–$1,000
- Tuition: $14,750
- Website: tampacatholic.org

Tampa Catholic High School is a diocesan, Catholic, coeducational high school located in Tampa, Florida, United States, founded in 1962. It is in the Roman Catholic Diocese of Saint Petersburg. Its motto is "Veritas et Caritas," which means "Truth and Charity."

== Description ==
The Diocese of St. Augustine opened Tampa Catholic High School on September 4, 1962, to serve the needs of Catholic education for the parish families of Hillsborough County. The school was guided through its early years by Monsignor John F. Scully, the founding President, and was staffed by diocesan priests, the Dominican Sisters of Adrian, Michigan, and dedicated lay personnel. The school opened with one classroom building and a convent.

After spending one year in temporary quarters at Christ the King parish, 230 ninth and tenth grade students made their way to the new Tampa Catholic campus. TC was initially planned to house a girls' division to be known as Lourdes Academy; the boys' division was to be located elsewhere in Tampa. The plan was changed to provide a coeducational facility, taking into account the already operating Academy of the Holy Names and Jesuit High School. The campus consisted of only the South and Center buildings, with the library, chapel and administration located in the Center building. The early classes were held in eight classrooms with a chemistry-physics-biology laboratory, a home economics room, a library, and an administration area.

In 1964 the first class of seniors was enrolled and the multi-purpose building (now the cafeteria) was completed. In 1965 Tampa Catholic graduated its first class, numbering 51. This was also the first year TC had a full squad for a football team, playing a schedule of both JV and varsity games. At the time they were the Tampa Catholic Colts.

In 1968, Tampa Catholic became fully accredited by the Southern Association of Colleges and Schools and saw the completion of the north building, chapel, gym, track and baseball diamond, all of which were dedicated by Bishop Charles McLaughlin, of the newly founded Diocese of St. Petersburg.

In the early 1970s the Assumptionist Brothers and the Sisters of Ste-Chrétienne assumed administrative and teaching duties. The administration building and the library complex were completed in 1972. These early years of the 1970s saw Tampa Catholic's enrollment rocket to nearly 1500 students. This was more than the buildings could accommodate so the school was separated into two campuses for three years. The 9th grade students attended the "East Campus" located on the grounds of Mary Help of Christians School, and additional portables were brought onto the TC campus to help house upperclassmen.

In late 1979 the leadership changed once again with the appointment of Br. Jude Byrne of the Franciscan Brothers Community taking over as principal. Following several changes in administration, stability was once again gained by the 1984 appointment of Br. John Casey of the Congregation of Christian Brothers. By this time Tampa Catholic High School had grown to a nine-building campus stretching over 40 acres.

During the 1983–84 school year, TC entered into the tech era by installing the first computers on campus. They were used to teach students in computer programming classes.

In 2002 efforts moved forward to establish a master plan for the 40-year-old school. This plan called for needed upgrades to the academic portion of the campus. Ground was broken that same year. In 2003 these improvements were completed, including the Archbishop Joseph P. Hurley Science & Technology Center and the Blessed Edmund Rice Chapel. Bishop Robert N. Lynch dedicated both buildings on August 27, 2003.

In 2019, Tampa Catholic alumni and tech entrepreneur Arnie Bellini, founder of ConnectWise, and his wife, Lauren, donated $15 million to Tampa Catholic High School. Their gift funded the creation of the Bellini Center for the Arts, a facility designed to nurture human creativity and cultivate the skills needed to ensure humanity stays relevant as AI is further integrated into society. The Center prepares future generations while providing community outreach to make artistic expression accessible to all. The center will expand the integration of arts programs in the school's curriculum, helping to attract top teachers and students. Spanning 28,000 square feet, the facility will include classrooms and studios for art, computer graphics, video production, stagecraft, and a performing arts practice area. Slated to open in March 2025, the center will also feature a 750-seat auditorium and a flexible event space for community activities such as reunions, lectures, and special events. This donation represents the largest contribution ever made to a Catholic school in Florida.

== List of presidents and principals ==
| President | Tenure | Principal | Tenure |
|---|---|---|---|
| Msgr. John F. Scully | 1962-1968 | Sr. Ann Bernard, OP | 1962-1968 |
| Fr. Norman Balthazar | 1968-1971 | Sr. Julie Sullivan, OP | 1968-1978 |
| none | 1971–present | Br. Venard Cullen, AA | 1978-1979 |
| none | 1971–present | Br. Jude Byrne, OSF | 1979 |
| none | 1971–present | Br. Patrick Ohmann, OSF | 1979-1981 |
| none | 1971–present | Mr. Frank Scaglione | 1981-1984 |
| none | 1971–present | Br. William Casey, CFC | 1984-1987 |
| none | 1971–present | Br. Michael Termini, CFC | 1987-1991 |
| none | 1971–present | Br. Myles B. Amend, CFC | 1991-1994 |
| none | 1971–present | Br. James J. MacDonald, CFC | 1994-1999 |
| none | 1971–present | Br. David M. McMahon, CFC | 1999-2003 |
| none | 1971–present | Ms. Patricia A. Landry | 2003-2008 |
| none | 1971–present | Mr. Thomas Reidy | 2008–2016 |

== Notable alumni ==
- Johni Broome, college basketball player for the Auburn Tigers
- Nardi Contreras, former professional baseball player (Chicago White Sox)
- Seminole Heights serial killer (Howell Emanuel "Trai" Donaldson III)
- JoAnna Garcia, actress
- Chaz Green, current NFL offensive tackle for the Dallas Cowboys
- Chuck Hernandez, current Miami Marlins pitching coach
- Darrell Jackson, former NFL wide receiver
- Kenny Kelly, former University of Miami quarterback; former professional baseball player (Tampa Bay Devil Rays, Seattle Mariners, New York Mets, Cincinnati Reds, Washington Nationals, Chicago White Sox)
- Karter Knox, basketball player
- Kevin Knox II, professional basketball player for the Portland Trail Blazers
- Julie Elizabeth Leto, author
- Tino Martinez, former New York Yankees first baseman; played for MLB (1990–2005)
- Lance McCullers, former professional baseball player (San Diego Padres, New York Yankees, Detroit Tigers, Texas Rangers)
- Joe Molloy, former Yankees managing partner
- Rich Monteleone, former professional baseball player (Seattle Mariners, California Angels, New York Yankees, San Francisco Giants)
- T. J. Moore, college football wide receiver for the Clemson Tigers
- J.R. Ramirez, actor
- Carlos Reyes, former professional baseball player (Oakland Athletics, San Diego Padres, Boston Red Sox, Philadelphia Phillies, Tampa Bay Rays)
- Bentlee Sanders, professional football player for the Calgary Stampeders
- Donnie Scott, former professional baseball player (Texas Rangers, Seattle Mariners, Cincinnati Reds)
- Manny Seoane, former professional baseball player (Philadelphia Phillies, Chicago Cubs)
- Gayle Sierens, news anchor for Tampa NBC affiliate WFLA-TV
- Denard Span, outfielder for the Tampa Bay Rays (formerly played with the Minnesota Twins, Washington Nationals, and San Francisco Giants)
- John Tamargo, former professional baseball player (St. Louis Cardinals, San Francisco Giants, Montreal Expos)
- Channing Tatum, actor
- D. J. Williams, professional American football player and coach
