= St. Petersburg Catholic High School =

Private school in Florida, United States

Location
- 6333 9th Avenue North; St. Petersburg, Pinellas County, Florida 33710; United States; 27°46′54″N 82°43′23″W

Information
- School type: Parents/Guardians, Private, Coeducational
- Motto: Fortes in Unitate ("Strong in Unity")
- Religious affiliation: Roman Catholic
- Opened: February 1957
- School code: 212
- President: Mr. Ross Bubolz
- Principal: Mr. Keith Galley
- Chaplain: Rev. Ralph F. D'Elia III
- Teaching staff: 28.3 (on an FTE basis) (2021–22)
- Grades: 9–12
- Age: 14 to 18
- Average class size: 18
- Student to teacher ratio: 14.7
- Hours in school day: 7.5
- Colors: Black and Gold
- Mascot: The Baron
- Team name: Barons
- Rival: Clearwater Central Catholic
- Accreditation: Southern Association of Colleges and Schools
- Tuition: $13,900
- Director of Athletics: Nick Vandewalle
- Website: spchs.org

St. Petersburg Catholic High School is a private, co-educational Roman Catholic high school in St. Petersburg, Florida. It is located in the Roman Catholic Diocese of Saint Petersburg. The campus was originally opened in February 1957 as Bishop Barry High School for boys. In 1973, Bishop Barry High School and the nearby Notre Dame Academy for girls merged to become St. Petersburg Catholic High School. (A decade earlier, St. Paul's High School for girls was merged into Notre Dame Academy.)

In July 1998, the Salesians of Don Bosco took over administration of the school. In March 2017, the Diocese of St. Petersburg announced that it would resume direct control through its Office of Catholic Schools and Centers.

In 2015, the school introduced a partnership with Project Lead The Way, offering engineering and later biomedical science courses through the national program.

== Notable alumni ==
- Chris Davis (wide receiver, born 1984), former professional football player
- Bill Freehan, Class of 1959, former professional baseball player for the Detroit Tigers
- John Kirby (admiral), Class of 1981, retired U.S. Navy rear admiral, assistant secretary of state for public affairs, deputy assistant secretary of defense for media operations
- David Girardi, Class of 2007, NFL football quarterbacks coach
- Marty Lyons, Class of 1975, former professional football player for New York Jets and collegiate football player at University of Alabama
- Darryl Rouson, Florida State Representative and State Senator
- Jock Sanders, Class of 2007, former professional football player – American football wide receiver; played for the West Virginia Mountaineers in college, was undrafted in the National Football League (NFL), and has played for several Canadian Football League (CFL) teams.
- Doug Jamerson, the first African-American elected to the Florida Legislature from Pinellas County.

== $1 million gift ==
On January 17, 2019, St. Petersburg Catholic High School announced it had received a $1 million gift from Raymond James CEO Paul Reilly (’72) and his wife Rose. The gift was the largest ever received by the school, and funded significant renovations on the campus, including classrooms, offices, bathrooms, and faculty workspaces. The diocese was also able to add a new student chapel and courtyard. These were the first renovations since the school opened 60 years earlier.

== Visit by papal ambassador ==
On Jan. 26, 2024, St. Petersburg Catholic High School was the site of an education forum moderated by Cardinal Christophe Pierre, the pope’s ambassador to the United States. The forum discussed “The Risk of Education,” a book published by Father Luigi Giussani, an Italian priest and teacher. The panel featured secular and Catholic educators from Florida and Ohio discussing how they apply the teachings of Father Giussani from the book.

== Allegations of Racism and Independent Investigation ==
In January 2022, racist graffiti was found in a school restroom calling for the killing of all Black people, using a racial slur. The St. Petersburg Police Department investigated the matter, but despite the school's full cooperation including opening an anonymous tip line to students, the person or persons responsible were not identified. In addition to the racist graffiti, the word “monkey” was carved into a classroom door, and it was also asserted that racial bullying occurred at the school with the dean of students allegedly calling Black students “hoodlums”; some students addressing Black students as “slave” or the N-word; and some students exhibiting confederate flags on their cars.

An independent investigation released in April 2022 found that accusations of racism leveled at the dean of students were unfounded and that the school promptly investigated each incident of student misconduct identified in the report, disciplining responsible students under the school's Code of Conduct.

The President of the St. Petersburg Branch of the NAACP requested to meet with the school's principal about the matter. The NAACP and St. Petersburg Catholic High School alumnus and State Senator Darryl Rouson denounced the acts of racism, and the President of the Pinellas County Chapter of the Democratic Black Caucus of Florida and a Pinellas County Commissioner called for the removal of the school's dean. However, the report released by independent investigators did not recommend his dismissal.

In April 2022, the Federal Bureau of Investigation and the United States Department of Justice contacted the St. Petersburg Chapter of the NAACP to host listening sessions to hear concerns about the safety of minority students at St. Petersburg Catholic High School and to present any accounts of racism to the office of the United States Attorney.

In a letter sent to parents and made public through local reporting, the school subsequently committed to implement all recommendations made by the independent investigation, to review the school handbook discipline structure, establish a student group and a community committee focused on human dignity and solidarity issues within the school community, and to update professional development for staff so they are more prepared to work with a more diverse student population.

== Touchdown Mary mural ==
Touchdown Mary mural located at St. Petersburg Catholic High School

On Aug. 30, 2024, Bishop Gregory Parkes unveiled a new mural, “Touchdown Mary”, at Joseph W. Paul Stadium on the school's campus. The mural was inspired by the Word of Life mural, known as “Touchdown Jesus” on the campus of the University of Notre Dame. The 42-foot-tall mural depicts the Immaculate Heart of Mary. It was produced by local artists Leon Bedore (TesOne) and Johnny Vitale of the Vitale Brothers. The school commissioned the mural in memory of their late chaplain, Father Carl Melchior, who left his career with the Tampa Bay Buccaneers to become a priest.

== See also ==
- Roman Catholic Diocese of Saint Petersburg
- Salesians of Don Bosco
- Clearwater Central Catholic High School
- Tampa Catholic High School
- Bishop McLaughlin Catholic High School
