= Donnie Scott =

American baseball player (born 1961)

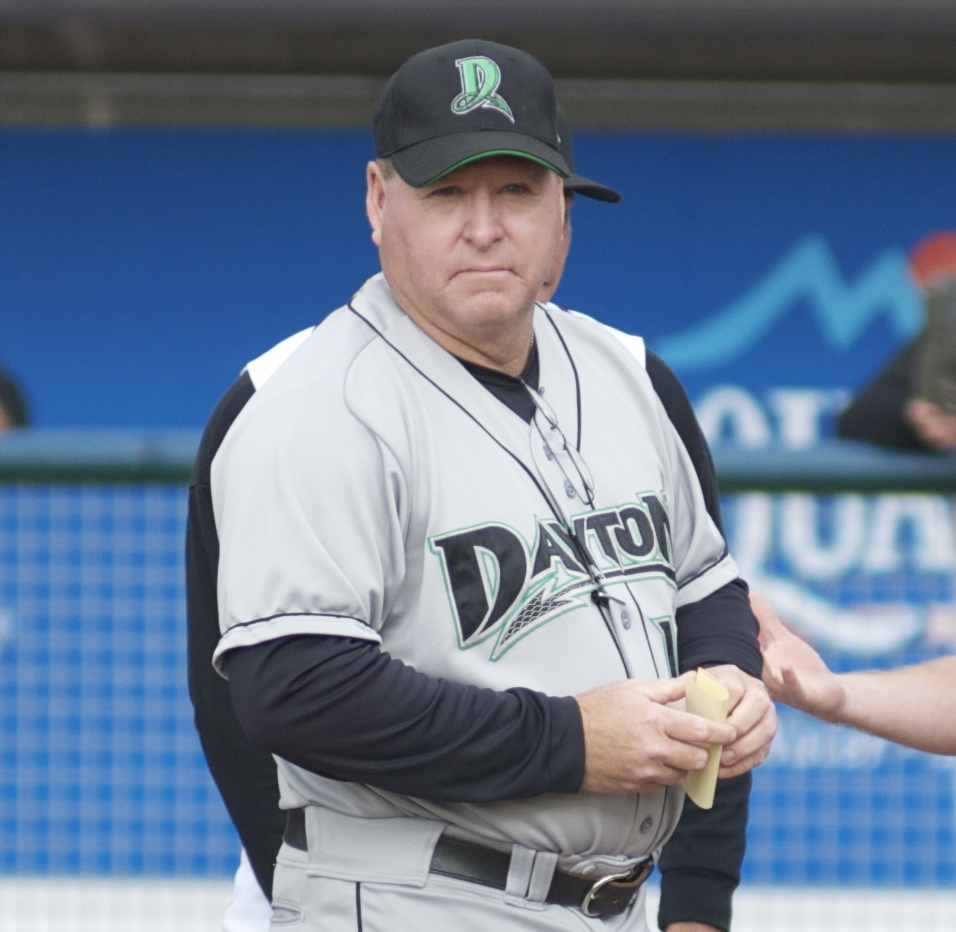
- Scott with the Dayton Dragons in 2007
- Catcher
- Born: August 16, 1961 (age 64); Dunedin, Florida, U.S.
- Batted: Switch Threw: Right

MLB debut
- September 30, 1983, for the Texas Rangers

Last MLB appearance
- October 4, 1991, for the Cincinnati Reds

MLB statistics
- Batting average: .217
- Home runs: 7
- Runs batted in: 43
- Stats at Baseball Reference

Teams
- Texas Rangers (1983–1984); Seattle Mariners (1985); Cincinnati Reds (1991)

Donald Malcolm Scott (born August 16, 1961) is an American former professional baseball catcher who is currently the manager of the Madison Mallards. From 1983 to 1985 and in 1991, he was a backup and part-time catcher in Major League Baseball (MLB) for the Texas Rangers, Seattle Mariners, and Cincinnati Reds. Scott also played in the farm systems for the Baltimore Orioles and Milwaukee Brewers. He worked as a minor league manager and coach in the Reds organization from 1992 to 2008.

== Playing career ==
Scott first played high school baseball at St. Petersburg Catholic High School in St. Petersburg, Florida, where threw a no-hitter as a pitcher. The Rangers selected Scott in the second round of the 1979 MLB draft out of Tampa Catholic High School in Tampa. He was a September call-up in 1983, batting 0-for-4 in two MLB games for the Rangers. He played in a career-high 81 games in his rookie season in 1984, batting .221 with three home runs, after playing in Triple-A in April and May.

Texas traded Scott to Seattle for Orlando Mercado on April 4, 1985. He hit a pinch-hit, two-run single in his first game for the Mariners on April 26. In 81 games with the Mariners, Scott set career bests with four home runs and 23 runs batted in. Seattle released him in March 1986.

Scott played in the minors from 1986 to 1991. He returned to the majors for 10 games with the Reds in 1991.

== Managing career ==
After his playing career, Scott managed the Billings Mustangs, where he would lead them to three straight Pioneer League championships from 1992 to 1994 and the league's best record in both halves of the season in 1995 (despite losing in the playoffs). He won the league's manager of the year awards in 1993. He returned to coach the Mustangs again in 1997, leading them to another league title. Until 2008, he was the manager of the Reds Single-A affiliate, the Dayton Dragons.

Scott then managed the Battle Creek Bombers, a collegiate summer team, winning the 2011 Collegiate Summer World Series and the Northwoods League manager of the year award. He became the manager of the Madison Mallards in 2013.

== Personal life ==
Scott and his wife reside in Pinellas Park, Florida. They have two children.
