= Sacred Heart Catholic Church (Tampa, Florida) =

Historic church in Tampa, Florida, U.S.

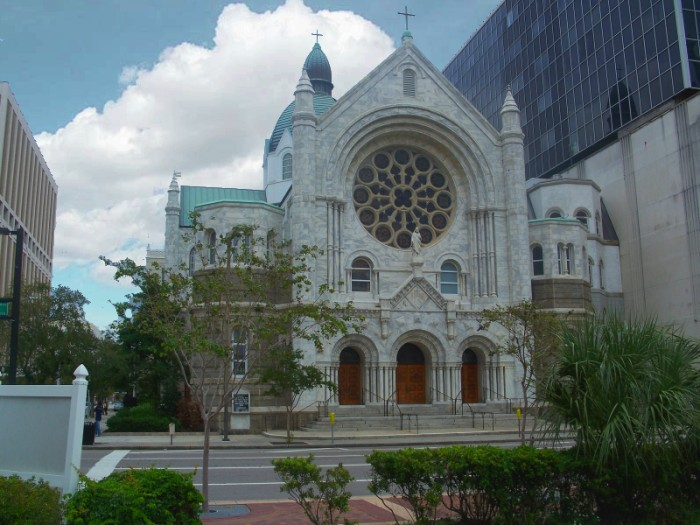

Religion
- Affiliation: Roman Catholic
- Province: Diocese of Saint Petersburg
- Rite: Latin Rite
- Leadership: Father Mike Jones, OFM
- Status: Active parish

Location
- Location: 509 North Florida Avenue; Tampa, Florida, U.S.
- Interactive map of Sacred Heart Catholic Church
- Territory: Diocese of Saint Petersburg
- Coordinates: 27.949354°N 82.457219°W

Architecture
- Architect: Nicholas J. Clayton
- Type: Church
- Style: Romanesque Revival
- Groundbreaking: February 16, 1898
- Completed: 1905
- Construction cost: $300,000

Website
- www.sacredheartfla.org

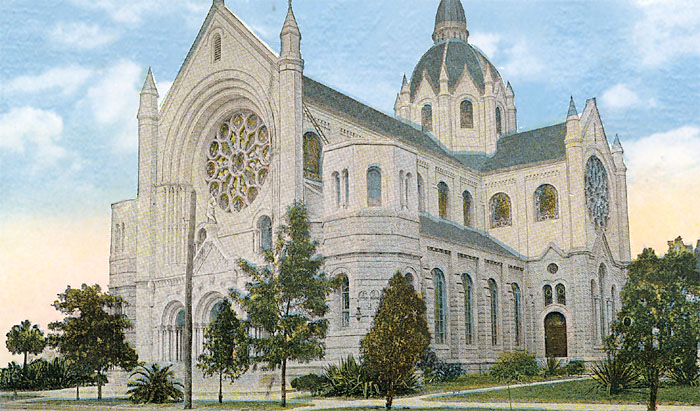
Post card image from the early 1900s

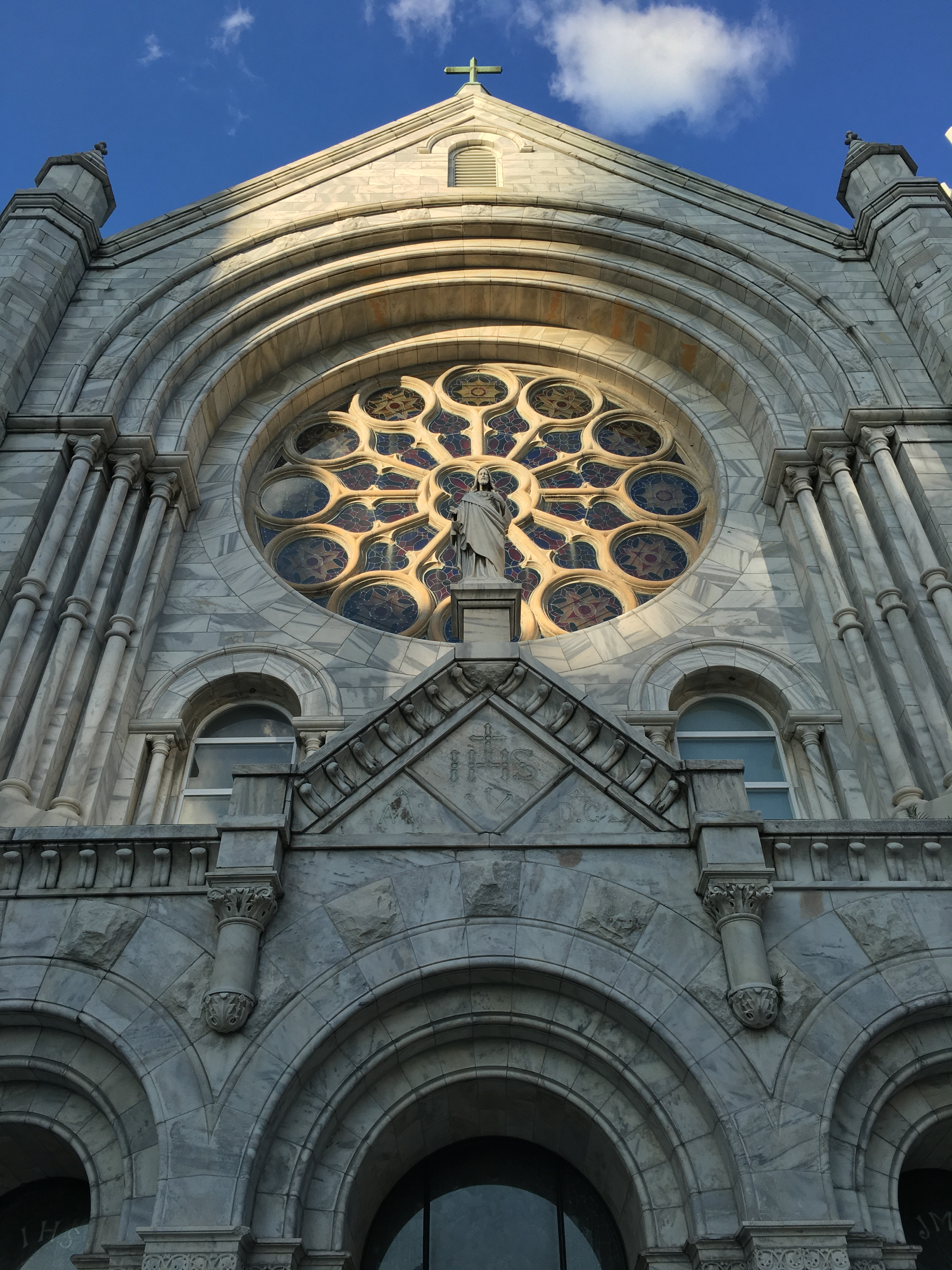
Late Afternoon at Sacred Heart Catholic Church - June 2016

Sacred Heart Catholic Church was constructed in 1905 in downtown Tampa, Florida and is one of the oldest churches in the city of Tampa. The church, located at 509 N. Florida Avenue, is predominantly a Romanesque structure, with other elements. The church is home to Sacred Heart Parish, part of the West Hillsborough Deanery of the Roman Catholic Diocese of Saint Petersburg.

The first Catholic parish on Florida's West Coast was established in 1860 and named St. Louis Parish in honor of Fr. Luis de Cancer, a Dominican missionary who was martyred on the shores of Tampa Bay in 1549. The initial wooden-frame building called St. Louis Church was erected on the site where Sacred Heart stands today. In 1888, the Jesuits took over the pastoral responsibilities of the parish, after a serious outbreak of yellow fever in Tampa took the lives of three diocesan priests. Using Tampa as their base, the Jesuits were given the responsibility of all of South Florida by Bishop Moore. In 1905, a new Church was constructed in Romanesque style and the parish was renamed Sacred Heart.

As Tampa grew, so did the parish, and by 1897 it was decided that a new church was needed. Construction on the church began with a groundbreaking on February 16, 1898, with the laying of the cornerstone taking place on February 4, 1900. The dedication of Sacred Heart Church took place on January 15, 1905, and at that time the parish was renamed Sacred Heart Parish.

The architect for the new Sacred Heart Church was Nicholas J. Clayton of Galveston, TX, who designed many Roman Catholic Churches in Texas and throughout the southern United States. The granite and marble structure includes a 135-foot dome, solid oak pews and doors, porcelain tiles, and a Carrara marble altar. Its 70 stained glass windows were designed and manufactured for Sacred Heart by Franz Mayer & Co. of Munich, Germany. The facility is a popular location for weddings, having hosted weddings for some parish families going back as many as six generations.

The parish operated a school, Sacred Heart Academy, which it established in 1931, on Florida Avenue in the city's Tampa Heights neighborhood. However, due to the changing demographics of the immediate area, Sacred Heart Academy was forced to close at the end of the 2011–12 school year. Previously affiliated with Sacred Heart Parish was another Tampa institution, Jesuit High School, founded in 1899, which thrives today.

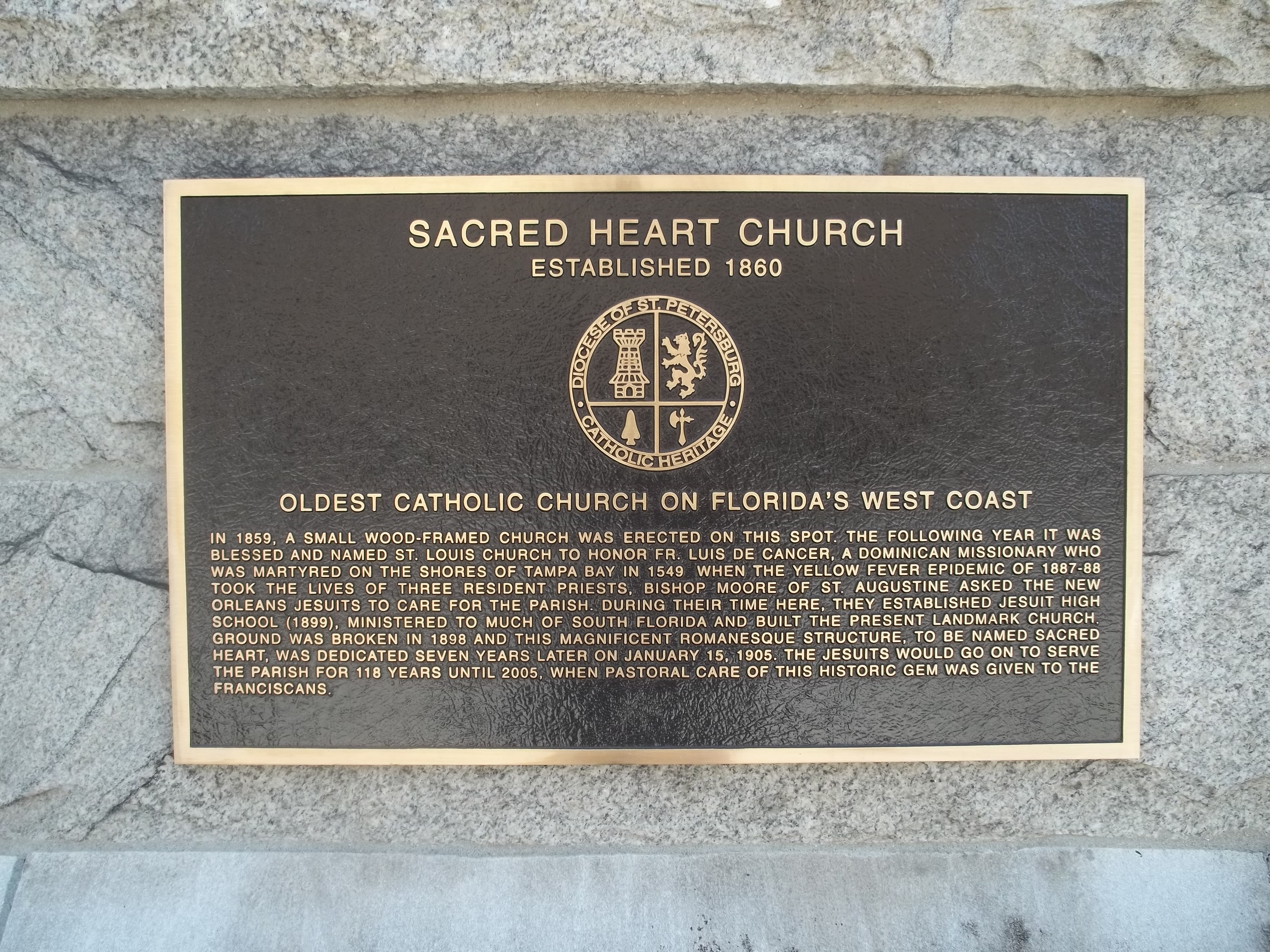
2010 Catholic Heritage Marker

In 2005, after the 100th anniversary of Sacred Heart Church, the Jesuit community which had long served the parish withdrew in order to concentrate on their academic institutions throughout the South. The fourth bishop of the Diocese of St. Petersburg, Most Rev. Robert Lynch, invited the Franciscan Friars of the Most Holy Name of Jesus Province to assume the pastoral responsibilities for the parish. The current pastor is Father Stephen Mimnaugh, OFM. In 2010 the Diocese of St. Petersburg added a Catholic Heritage Marker to the church exterior, recognizing its historic significance.

== See also ==
- Roman Catholic Diocese of Saint Petersburg
- St. Louis Catholic Cemetery
