= Luis Cáncer =

Spanish missionary (c. 1500–1549)

Servant of God Luis de Cáncer OP
- Born: c. 1500; Barbastro, Crown of Aragon, Spain
- Died: 26 June 1549 (aged 48–49); Tampa Bay, Spanish Florida

Luis Cáncer de Barbastro or Luis de Cáncer (1500 – 26 June 1549) was a Spanish Dominican priest and pioneer missionary to the New World. He undertook a non-violent approach to converting the American Indians to Christianity, and had significant success in this regard in the Caribbean and later in Guatemala. In 1549, he continued his mission work in Florida, an area already ravaged by previous explorers, and was killed on the shores of Tampa Bay. Since his death, he has been regarded by many as a martyr.

== Biography ==
=== Early life ===
Cáncer was born at Barbastro in Aragón in 1500. Luis entered the Dominican order and was inspired like many of his time to go to the New World in an effort to spread Christianity.

Fray de Cáncer came to the New World in 1518 and worked successfully for some time among the native peoples of Puerto Rico and Hispaniola. He then ventured to the mainland and had particular success in Guatemala. A disciple of the famed Indian protector, Bartolomé de las Casas, Father de Cáncer's efforts were so successful in an area that was known for its bellicose natives, that it was renamed the "Province of True Peace." He believed that aggression and violence were counter-productive to the spread of the Gospel and that the native peoples needed to be treated with dignity. He had great success in pacifying the Indians whom more violent methods had failed to subdue. He upheld the cause of the natives at an ecclesiastical assembly held in Mexico in 1546.

=== Florida expedition and death ===
Following his missionary success in Guatemala, Cáncer proposed a peaceful mission to Florida. The peninsula had already been ravaged by the expeditions of Pánfilo Narváez and Hernando de Soto and was regarded as very hostile to the Spanish, and Cáncer argued that further violence would never bring about its conversion to Catholicism and submission. In 1547, King Charles V approved Cáncer's Florida mission. However, the royal decree stipulated that the mission land at Florida's upper east coast, avoiding hostile territory in southern Florida and the Gulf Coast where earlier conquistadors had gone.

Cáncer recruited fellow Dominicans Gregorio de Beteta, Diego de Tolosa, Juan García, and a certain Brother Fuentes. Leaving Vera Cruz, they reached Havana in 1549. There, they took on a converted Florida Indian, Magdalena, a "highly recommended" interpreter. The expedition then left for Florida on a caravel captained by Juan de Arena. Despite the warnings to avoid the Gulf Coast, Arena took them to an area south of Tampa Bay, only miles from where the previous expeditions had landed. There, they encountered a group of apparently peaceful and receptive Indians, who told them about the many populous villages of the Tocobaga chiefdom around Tampa Bay. Perceiving the possibility of goodwill, the expedition split, with Magdalena, Diego de Tolosa, Brother Fuentes, and an unknown sailor joining the Indians on the half-day's land route, and Cáncer returning to the caravel to meet them at the bay.

The caravel reached Tampa Bay on 23 June 1549, but only Magdalena and a group of Indians greeted them. Magdalena, now "much changed" and wearing Indian attire, told Cáncer that she had convinced the local chief that the friars were peaceful, and that the other Spaniards were now his guests. Cáncer and the others returned to the caravel that evening, and on board they found Juan Munos, a sailor who had been enslaved by the Indians years before but now escaped. Munos indicated that the Tocobaga had killed the two friars and enslaved the sailor. Beteta and García wanted to flee immediately and sail for the east coast of Florida, but Cáncer refused to leave a land "hallowed by the life blood" of his compatriots. The next day, the three men rowed to shore, where they saw a group of hostile Indians, and Cáncer exited the boat. He waded to shore and prayed for a while. Upon rising, he was brought to the group and beaten to death with clubs.

== Veneration ==
Cáncer has been regarded as a proto-martyr of Florida, as one of the Martyrs of La Florida. In 1860, Bishop Augustín Verot decided that the first parish on Florida's west coast should be named St. Louis Church in his honor. Likewise, in 1918 Cáncer's likeness was installed as part of a large stained glass window at the Church of St. Vincent Ferrer (New York) run by the Order of Preachers. In 1998 the Diocese of St. Petersburg established the Fr. Luis de Cáncer Distinguished Priestly Service Award to be given annually to a priest of the Diocese of St. Petersburg who best exemplifies selfless and dedicated service to the people of God. The Espíritu Santo Catholic Church in Safety Harbor, Florida, which is not far from the location of Cáncer's death, also has a stained glass window that depicts de Cáncer's martyrdom. In 2011, the diocese placed a Catholic Heritage Marker at the main entrance of that church, acknowledging both his and other early Catholic missionary efforts in the Tampa Bay area.

In 2015, the Congregation for the Causes of Saints bestowed the title Servant of God on Cáncer and 85 other Native American and Spanish martyrs of Florida, the United States Conference of Catholic Bishops has endorsed the cause.
