= Jeff Smith (wide receiver, born 1997) =

American football player (born 1997)

Profile
- Position: Wide receiver

Personal information
- Born: April 21, 1997 (age 29); St. Petersburg, Florida, U.S.
- Listed height: 6 ft 1 in (1.85 m)
- Listed weight: 195 lb (88 kg)

Career information
- High school: Clearwater Central Catholic (Clearwater, Florida)
- College: Boston College
- NFL draft: 2019: undrafted

Career history
- New York Jets (2019–2022); New York Giants (2023)*; Arizona Cardinals (2023–2024)*
- * Offseason or practice squad member only

Career NFL statistics
- Receptions: 34
- Receiving yards: 426
- Stats at Pro Football Reference

Jeffrey Alan Smith II (born April 21, 1997) is an American professional football wide receiver. He played college football for the Boston College Eagles.

== Early life ==
Smith grew up in St. Petersburg, Florida and attended Clearwater Central Catholic High School, where he played high school football. He was the Marauders starting quarterback. As a senior, he passed for 2,165 yards, rushed for 1,236 yards, and accounted for 34 total touchdowns.

== College career ==
Smith was a member of the Boston College Eagles for four seasons from 2015 to 2018. As a true freshman, he started the final three games of the season at quarterback following an injury to starter Darius Wade. He completed 27 of 82 passes for 253 yards with two touchdowns and three interceptions while rushing for 454 yards and 6 touchdowns in five total games played. He moved to wide receiver before his sophomore year and finished the season with 27 receptions for 395 yards and 3 touchdowns while also rushing for 199 yards and a touchdown. As a junior, Smith caught 25 passes for 296 yards while rushing for 107 yards and a touchdown and also throwing for two touchdowns on trick plays. Smith had 20 catches for 387 yards and six touchdowns, rushed for 142 yards and a touchdown, and passed for 67 yards and a touchdown in his senior season. He finished his collegiate career with 73 receptions for 1,116 yards and 10 touchdowns, 906 rushing yards and nine touchdowns on 143 carries, and completed 34 passes for 404 yards, six touchdowns and three interceptions.

== Professional career ==
Pre-draft measurables
Height	Weight	Arm length	Hand span	40-yard dash	10-yard split	20-yard split	20-yard shuttle	Three-cone drill	Vertical jump	Broad jump	Bench press
6 ft 0 in (1.83 m)	191 lb (87 kg)	31 1/2 in (0.80 m)	9 in (0.23 m)	4.34 s	1.52 s	2.50 s	4.06 s	6.87 s	36.5 in (0.93 m)	10 ft 7 in (3.23 m)	15 reps
All values from Pro Day

=== New York Jets ===
Smith signed with the New York Jets as an undrafted free agent on April 27, 2019. He was cut at the end of training camp during final roster cuts, but was re-signed by the Jets to their practice squad on September 1, 2019. The Jets promoted Smith to the Jets active roster on December 9, 2019. Smith made his NFL debut on December 12, 2019 against the Baltimore Ravens, catching one pass for 12 yards. He was placed on injured reserve on December 17, 2019.

On September 7, 2020, Smith was placed on injured reserve. He was activated on October 1, 2020 prior to Week 4.

Smith signed an exclusive-rights free agent tender with the Jets on April 19, 2021.

In 2022, Smith played in 11 games and caught eight passes for 134 yards. On December 31, 2022, Smith was placed on season–ending injured reserve with a knee injury.

=== New York Giants ===
On March 17, 2023, Smith signed a one-year contract with the New York Giants. He was waived/injured on August 4, 2023, and placed on injured reserve. He was released with an injury settlement on August 11, 2023.

=== Arizona Cardinals ===
On September 20, 2023, Smith was signed to the Arizona Cardinals practice squad. On November 2, Smith was released with an injury settlement. He was re-signed to the practice squad on December 11. He signed a reserve/future contract on January 8, 2024. He was waived on August 13.
