= Juana Bordas =

Nicaraguan–American community activist

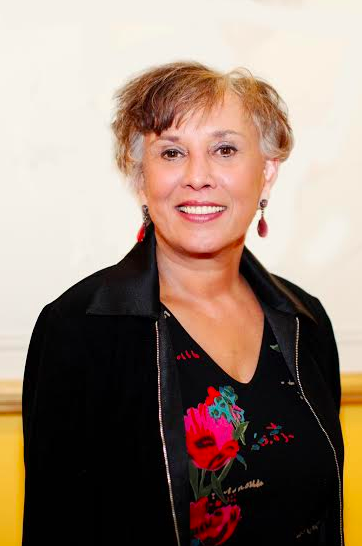
- Born: 1942 (age 83–84); Nicaragua
- Occupation: Community activist
- Years active: 1976—present
- Known for: Latino community activist, leadership training, diversity training
- Notable work: Salsa, Soul, and Spirit: Leadership for a Multicultural Age (2007)

Juana María Bordas (born 1942) is a Nicaraguan–American community activist specializing in leadership development and diversity training. She is a founder of several Denver, Colorado-area organizations promoting Latino and Latina leadership, including the Mi Casa Resource Center for Women, the National Hispana Leadership Institute, and Mestiza Leadership International, where she currently serves as president. She has authored two books and is a motivational speaker and workshop presenter for conferences and businesses. The recipient of numerous awards and honors, she was inducted into the Colorado Women's Hall of Fame in 1997.

== Early life and education ==
Juana María Bordas was born in a small mining town in Nicaragua in 1942. She is one of seven children. Her father left the family to earn money in the United States when she was a baby; at age 3, she and her older siblings and mother followed him to Tampa, Florida, on a banana boat.

She attended the Academy of the Holy Names, a Catholic all-girls high school, on a scholarship, and babysat during Sunday services at a local church to cover the rest of her tuition. She was the first in her family to attend college. She became involved in campus activism at the University of Florida; in 1963 she joined a march to the administration building to protest the non-enrollment of minority students. She earned her undergraduate degree at the University of Florida and her master's degree in social work at the University of Wisconsin–Madison.

Inspired by her parents, who believed that education was key to Latino advancement, and by President John F. Kennedy, who spoke on campus about the need to "give back to your country", she joined the Peace Corps after completing her undergraduate degree. In Santiago, Chile, she helped low-income men and women develop cooperative enterprises. Her 1964–1966 stint afforded her the first exposure to Latinos in positions of leadership, both in the economic and political realms.

== Career ==
Historically, leadership has been hierarchical, the domain of the influential few, and associated with control and dominance. This type of leadership is not strategically suited for the global multicultural age where change is constant and our problems are very complex. People are better educated and want to participate.

— Juana Bordas

Bordas moved to Denver in 1971. In 1976 she helped found the Mi Casa Resource Center for Women, which she led as executive director for the next decade. In 1987 she co-founded the National Hispana Leadership Institute, which grooms Latinas for leadership roles on the national level. She was president of the Institute for its first seven years. She was also the first Latina faculty member of the Center for Creative Leadership, and the first Hispanic certified psychiatric social worker in Colorado.

In 1993 she introduced the Latino Leadership Development Program, which provides individual assessments and coaching for Latinos interested in contributing to private and community initiatives. In 1995 she established the consulting firm Mestiza Leadership International, which provides diversity training and leadership programs in the workforce. In 2002 she debuted the Circle of Latina Leadership, which runs a nine-month community leadership development course and personal mentoring program for women aged 25 to 40.

Bordas is a motivational speaker and workshop facilitator for many public and private organizations. She was the Fall 2008 Scholar in Residence at Frostburg State University.

== Affiliations and memberships ==
Bordas has served as an advisor for the Hispanic Journal on Public Policy at Harvard University and the Kellogg National Fellows Program. She was vice chair of the Greenleaf Center for Servant Leadership, and a trustee of the International Leadership Association and Union Institute & University. In 1993 she was considered for the post of Peace Corps director by the Clinton administration; the position was ultimately filled by Carol Bellamy.

== Works ==
Bordas published her first book, Salsa, Soul, and Spirit: Leadership for a Multicultural Age, in 2007. The book presents eight principles of multicultural leadership gleaned from Latino, African American, and Native American cultures. It also profiles leaders from those backgrounds. In the book, Bordas mentions a common impediment for educational advancement in the Latino community called the "crab syndrome":

My parents wanted to protect me; they struggled with my decision to leave home to attend college. They were also afraid that once I left, I wouldn't come back. This tendency to hold on to people for safekeeping, which sometimes prevents them from leaving, is commonly known as the crab syndrome by many people in communities of color.

Bordas' second book, The Power of Latino Leadership: Culture, Inclusion, and Contribution, was published in 2013. Centering on Latino issues, the book sets forth ten principles of Latino leadership gleaned from the culture. Both books were "well-received by minority and corporate leadership experts". Salsa, Soul, and Spirit won the 2007 International Latino Book Award for best leadership book, and The Power of Latino Leadership received the 2014 Nautilus Award for best multicultural/indigenous book and the International Latino Book Award for best business/leadership book.

== Awards and honors ==
Bordas was inducted into the Colorado Women's Hall of Fame in 1997. She has received numerous awards and honors, including the 2006 Leadership Legacy Award from the Spellman College Center for Leadership; the 2008 Martin Luther King Jr. Social Responsibility Award; the 2009 Unique Woman of Colorado from The Denver Post and the Women's Foundation of Colorado; the 2015 Colorado's Most Influential and Powerful Women from the Colorado Diversity Council; the Outstanding Women in Business Award from the Denver Business Journal; and the Franklin Williams Award from the Peace Corps for "lifelong commitment to advancing communities of color".

Union Institute & University gave her an honorary Doctor of humane letters in 2009.

== Personal life ==
Bordas has three daughters.

== Bibliography ==
- Salsa, Soul, and Spirit: Leadership for a Multicultural Age. Berrett-Koehler Publishers. 2007. ISBN 978-1576754320. (2nd revised edition pub. 2012)
- The Power of Latino Leadership: Culture, Inclusion, and Contribution. Berrett-Koehler Publishers. 2013. ISBN 978-1609948870.
