= Dillon Mitchell (basketball) =

American basketball player (born 2003)

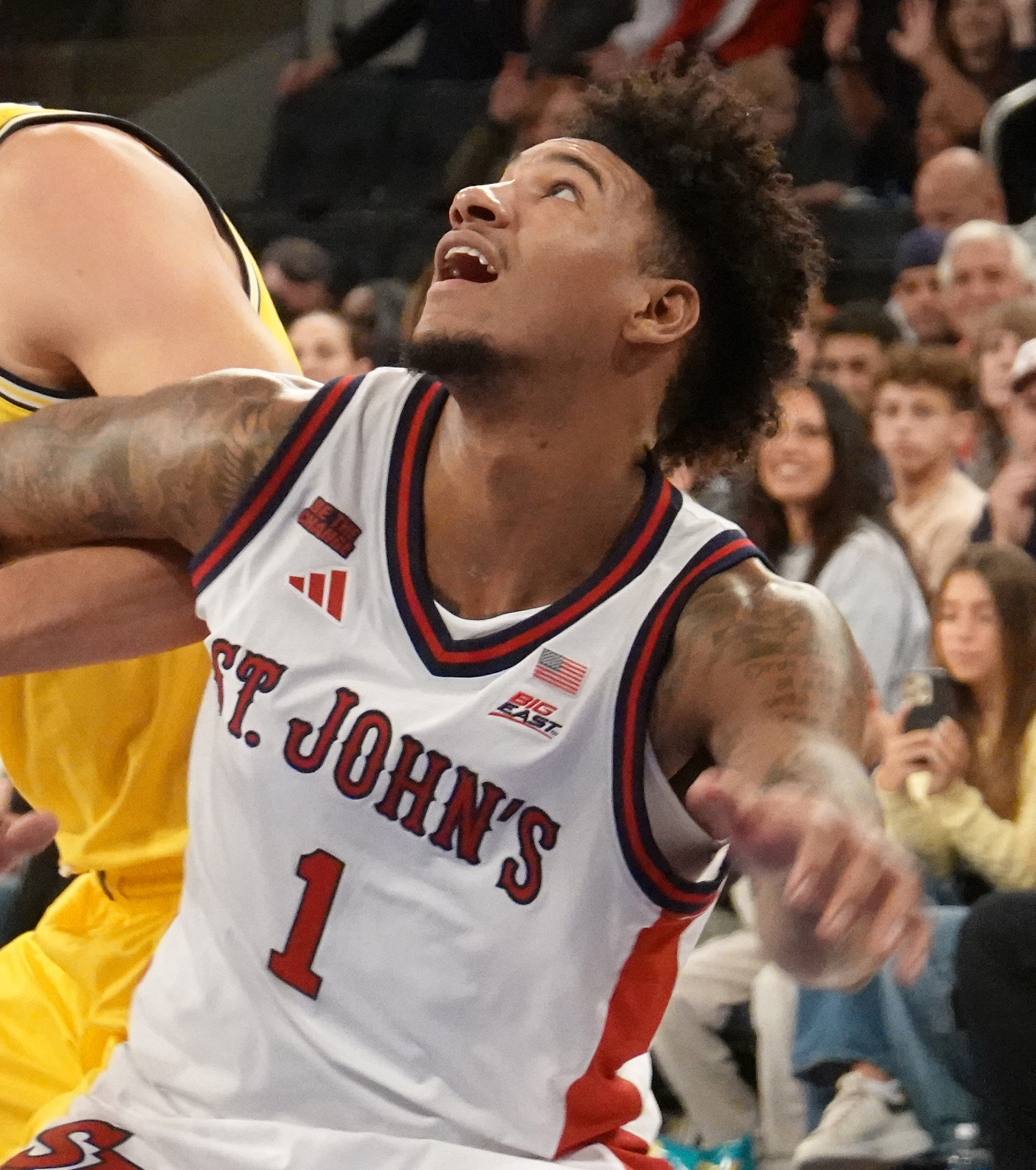
- Mitchell in 2025

No. 20 – Boston Celtics
- Position: Small forward
- League: NBA

Personal information
- Born: October 3, 2003 (age 23) Tampa, Florida, U.S.
- Listed height: 6 ft 6 in (1.98 m)
- Listed weight: 200 lb (91 kg)

Career information
- High school: Sickles (Citrus Park, Florida); Bishop McLaughlin Catholic (Spring Hill, Florida); Montverde Academy (Montverde, Florida)
- College: Texas (2022–2024); Cincinnati (2024–2025); St. John's (2025–2026)
- NBA draft: 2026: 2nd round, 40th overall pick
- Drafted by: Boston Celtics
- Playing career: 2026–present

Career history
- 2026–present: Boston Celtics
- 2026–present: →Maine Celtics

Career highlights
- Third-team All-Big East (2026); Big East All-Defensive Team (2026); McDonald's All-American (2022); Jordan Brand Classic MVP (2022); Nike Hoop Summit (2022)
- Stats at NBA.com
- Stats at Basketball Reference

Dillon Anthony Mitchell (born October 3, 2003) is an American professional basketball player for the Boston Celtics of the National Basketball Association (NBA), on a two-way contract for the Maine Celtics of the NBA G League. He was select with the 40th overall pick in the 2026 NBA draft. He played college basketball for the Texas Longhorns, Cincinnati Bearcats and St. John's Red Storm.

== High school career ==
Mitchell attended Sickles High School in Citrus Park, Florida, for his first two high school seasons before transferring to Bishop McLaughlin Catholic High School in Spring Hill, Florida, for his junior year. He averaged 17.6 points, 10.6 rebounds, 3.2 assists and 2.1 blocks per game while helping Bishop McLaughlin compile a 22–7 record and reach the 2021 Florida Class 3A state championship game.

Mitchell transferred to Montverde Academy for his senior season. He averaged 12.3 points, 10 rebounds and 1.5 blocks per game as Montverde won the 2022 GEICO High School Nationals championship. Mitchell recorded 17 points, 12 rebounds and three steals in the championship game against Link Academy.

Mitchell played in the 2022 McDonald's All-American Boys Game, the Jordan Brand Classic and the Nike Hoop Summit. He scored a game-high 18 points for Team Air in the Jordan Brand Classic and was named the team's most valuable player.

=== Recruiting ===
Mitchell was considered a consensus five-star recruit in the 2022 class. ESPN and Rivals ranked him fourth nationally, while the 247Sports Composite ranked him fifth. On October 25, 2021, he committed to play college basketball for Texas, choosing the Longhorns over Tennessee and Florida State.

College recruiting
Name	Hometown	School	Height	Weight	Commit date
Dillon Mitchell; SF	Tampa, FL	Montverde Academy (FL)	6 ft 8 in (2.03 m)	200 lb (91 kg)	Oct 25, 2021
Dillon Mitchell; SF	Recruit ratings: Rivals: 247Sports: ESPN: (94)				
Overall recruit ranking: Rivals: 4 247Sports: 8 ESPN: 4
Note: In many cases, Scout, Rivals, 247Sports, On3, and ESPN may conflict in their listings of height and weight.; In these cases, the average was taken. ESPN grades are on a 100-point scale.; Sources: "Texas 2022 Basketball Commitments". Rivals.; "2022 Texas Longhorns Recruiting Class". ESPN.; "2022 Team Ranking". Rivals.; "Texas 2022 Basketball Commits". 247Sports.

== College career ==
As a freshman at Texas, Mitchell started all 38 games and averaged 4.3 points and 3.9 rebounds per game while shooting 63.6 percent from the field. He was named to the Big 12 Academic All-Rookie Team. During his sophomore season, he averaged 9.6 points, 7.5 rebounds and 1.4 assists in 29.0 minutes per game while shooting 58.5 percent from the field. Following the season, Mitchell transferred to Cincinnati, choosing the Bearcats over Miami and Auburn.

Mitchell started all 35 games during the 2024–25 season at Cincinnati. He averaged 9.9 points and 6.9 rebounds per game while shooting 61.4 percent from the field. After the season, he transferred to St. John's.

In his lone season at St. John's, Mitchell appeared in 37 games with 25 starts and averaged 8.3 points, 7.0 rebounds, 3.0 assists and 1.3 steals in 28.2 minutes per game. He was selected to the third-team All-Big East and the conference's inaugural All-Defensive Team. Mitchell also earned Big East All-Tournament Team, second-team NABC North Atlantic All-District and second-team All-Met honors.

== Professional career ==
On June 24, 2026, the Boston Celtics selected Mitchell with the 40th overall pick in the 2026 NBA draft. The pick originally belonged to the Milwaukee Bucks and had been acquired by Boston from the Orlando Magic in a 2025 draft-night trade. Mitchell was named to Boston's roster for the 2026 NBA Summer League. He wore No. 20 in the Celtics' Summer League opener on July 10.

== Career statistics ==
Legend
GP	Games played	GS	Games started	MPG	Minutes per game
FG%	Field goal percentage	3P%	3-point field goal percentage	FT%	Free throw percentage
RPG	Rebounds per game	APG	Assists per game	SPG	Steals per game
BPG	Blocks per game	PPG	Points per game	**Bold**	Career high

=== College ===
Year	Team	GP	GS	MPG	FG%	3P%	FT%	RPG	APG	SPG	BPG	PPG
2022–23	Texas	**38**	**38**	17.4	**.636**	—	.405	3.9	.4	.6	.3	4.3
2023–24	Texas	34	33	**29.0**	.585	.000	**.598**	**7.5**	1.4	1.0	**.9**	9.6
2024–25	Cincinnati	35	35	28.1	.614	**.294**	.395	6.9	1.7	**1.4**	.6	**9.9**
2025–26	St. John's	37	25	28.2	.559	.067	.494	7.0	**3.0**	1.3	.7	8.3
Career		144	131	25.5	.593	.193	.488	6.3	1.6	1.1	.6	8.0
