= Gregory Parkes =

American Catholic prelate (born 1964)

His Excellency, The Most Reverend Gregory Parkes JCL
- Bishop of Saint Petersburg
- Church: Catholic Church
- Province: Miami
- Diocese: Saint Petersburg
- Appointed: November 28, 2016
- Installed: January 4, 2017
- Predecessor: Robert Nugent Lynch
- Previous post: Bishop of Pensacola-Tallahassee (2012-2016)

Orders
- Ordination: June 26, 1999 by Norbert Dorsey, C.P.
- Consecration: June 5, 2012 by Thomas Gerard Wenski, John Gerard Noonan, and Felipe de Jesús Estévez

Personal details
- Born: April 2, 1964 (age 62) Mineola, New York, US
- Motto: Nomini Tuo da gloriam (Latin for 'To Your name give the glory')
- Styles
- Reference style: His Excellency; The Most Reverend
- Spoken style: Your Excellency
- Religious style: Bishop

Gregory Lawrence Parkes (born April 2, 1964) is an American Catholic prelate who serves as the fifth bishop of Saint Petersburg in Florida. He previously served as bishop of Pensacola-Tallahassee in Florida from 2012 to 2016.

== Early life and education ==
Parkes was born on April 2, 1964, in Mineola, New York. His brother Stephen Parkes is bishop of the Diocese of Savannah; they are one of only 11 pairs of sibling-bishops in American Catholic history.

For primary school, Gregory Parkes attended St. Rose of Lima School in Massapequa, New York. He graduated from Massapequa High School and attended Daytona Beach Community College in Daytona Beach, Florida. He earned a Bachelor of Finance degree from Florida State University in Tallahassee, Florida, and worked in banking in Tampa, Florida for seven years.

Parkes later stated that he heard God's call to the priesthood while a parishioner at Christ the King Parish in Tampa. He studied for the priesthood at St. Vincent de Paul Regional Seminary in Boynton Beach, Florida. In 1996, Parkes entered the Pontifical North American College while studying at the Pontifical Gregorian University in Rome. He received a Bachelor of Theology degree in 1998 and a Licentiate in Canon Law in 2000.

== Priesthood ==
On June 26, 1999, Parkes was ordained a priest at Saint James Cathedral in Orlando for the Diocese of Orlando by Bishop Norbert Dorsey.

After his 1999 ordination, the diocese assigned Parkes as the parochial vicar of Holy Family Parish in Orlando. He was transferred in 2005 to become the founding pastor of Corpus Christi Parish in Celebration, Florida. That same year, Thomas Wenski appointed Parkes as chancellor of the diocese. He also became its vicar general in 2009.

=== Bishop of Pensacola-Tallahassee ===
On March 20, 2012, Pope Benedict XVI appointed Parkes as the fifth bishop of Pensacola-Tallahassee. Parkes attended his first ad limina meeting with Benedict XVI at the Vatican prior to his consecration. Parkes was installed and consecrated on June 5, 2012, at St. Paul's Church in Pensacola, Florida. Archbishop Thomas Wenski was the consecrating prelate. Bishops John Noonan and Felipe Estévez were the co-consecrators.

In March 2015, Parkes led a public procession on Palm Sunday. He helped carry a large wooden cross through the streets in Gulf Breeze, Florida. The procession stopped along the way to observe the stations of the cross.

In October 2015, Parkes authorized a petition for Pope Francis to canonize 86 Native Americans, priests, religious lay brothers, and men, women and children known as Martyrs of La Florida. A month later, Parkes presented the petition to the U.S. Conference of Catholic Bishops (USCCB). which subsequently endorsed the petition. In October 2023, that petition advanced from the diocese to the Vatican, where officials will determine if the individuals named in the petition qualify as martyrs, a prerequisite for their beatification.

In May 2016, a group of parents protested the appointment of Roy C Marien as principal of John Paul II Catholic High School in Tallahassee, Florida. The parents objected to several teen novels authored by Marien that they felt were sexually explicit. In response, Parkes cited Marien’s excellent record as a pastor and school administrator.

=== Bishop of Saint Petersburg ===
On November 28, 2016, Pope Francis appointed Parkes as bishop of St. Petersburg, succeeding Bishop Robert Lynch. Parkes was installed at the Cathedral of Saint Jude the Apostle on January 4, 2017. For his pastoral motto, Parkes chose “To your name give the glory” from Psalm 115, Verse 1. On November 14, 2018, Parkes was elected USCCB treasurer, serving in that role from 2019 to 2022.

In 2018, Parkes hosted a listening session, a day-long workshop, and a series of civil dialogues where local Catholics could discuss how racism was impacting their lives in the Catholic Church and the community. Bishop Shelton Fabre, chair of the USCCB Ad-Hoc Committee Against Racism, was also present for the listening session.

In response to the Pennsylvania Grand Jury Report released in August 2018, Parkes issued a statement asking forgiveness on behalf of fellow clergy who had not protected children. He also directed diocesan officials to launch an accountability website detailing the safeguards the diocese put in place for those working with children and vulnerable adults, such as background screening and fingerprinting.

On October 17, 2018, Parkes and the diocese were named in a sexual abuse lawsuit by Mark Cattell, a Virginia resident. Cattell alleged that, at age nine, he had been abused in 1981 by Robert D. Huneke from Christ the King Parish in Tampa. In 1980, Huneke had sent a letter to the Bishop of Rockville Centre in New York, saying he had abused a boy named John Salveson years earlier in New York. On August 7, 1981, Salveson, now an adult, had written Bishop William Larkin, then Bishop of St. Petersburg, about Huneke. Despite Salveson's complaints, the diocese did not remove Huneke from ministry until 1982. The diocese and Parkes defended against this action; it was dismissed on March 29, 2019, by agreement of the parties.

Parkes attended his second ad limina visit to the Vatican in 2019. While Francis met with Parkes, the pope noticed Parkes' 6'8" height and asked if he ever played basketball. Parkes started a "View from the Top" podcast, giving an overview of the diocese, and his "Invitation to Worship" podcast, giving a quick overview of the weekly reading. In May 2021, Parkes blessed the new altar and celebrated Mass at a new parish, the first of its kind for Vietnamese Catholics in Tampa. In June 2022, surgeons amputated Parkes's right leg below the knee after years of unsuccessful treatment. In September 2022, he reported being able to drive and walk unassisted again and to live independently.

In September 2023, Parkes presented Catholic Charities with a $100,000 donation to assist the victims of Hurricane Idalia within the diocese. In November 2024, he presented a $300,000 donation to Catholic Charities in response to Hurricanes Helene and Milton.Parkes instituted the diocese’s first parental leave policy in January 2024. The benefit provides eight weeks of paid parental leave for all qualified diocesan employees. The policy was named “Forming the Family in Faith” .

==== 50th Anniversary Vision Plan ====
In 2018, the diocese celebrated its Golden jubilee. In honor of the anniversary, Parkes led a three-year vision plan titled "Courageously Living the Gospel" focusing on evangelization, alleviating social and economic hardships, and meeting the spiritual needs of youth and young adults.

Parkes blessed several new facilities and programs focused specifically on affordable housing and shelter for the unhoused, including Catholic Charities’ first shelter in Citrus County in 2018, affordable housing in Crystal River in 2023, a shelter that allows male heads of households in Pasco County and a new permanent supportive housing project associated with the Society of St. Vincent de Paul in New Port Richey in 2021. He also blessed a new facility at BayCare Medical Respite Program located at Pinellas Hope. St. Anthony’s Hospital, a local Catholic hospital and part of the BayCare system, oversees the Medical Respite Program.Ten parishes in central Pinellas County began collaborating on a new counseling services program that offers professional mental health services for both Catholics and non-Catholics in the community.

== Episcopal succession ==
Catholic Church titles
Preceded by Robert Nugent Lynch	Bishop of Saint Petersburg; 2017–Present	Succeeded by Incumbent
Preceded by John Ricard	Bishop of Pensacola-Tallahassee; 2012–2017	Succeeded by William Albert Wack
