= Diocese of Saint Petersburg =

Latin Catholic ecclesiastical jurisdiction in Florida, USA

Coordinates: 27°46′23″N 82°38′24″W

Diocese of Saint Petersburg Dioecesis Sancti Petri in Florida Diócesis de San Petersburgo
- Coat of arms

Location
- Country: United States
- Territory: Florida: Tampa Bay (Pinellas, Hillsborough, Pasco, Hernando and Citrus counties)
- Ecclesiastical province: Miami

Statistics
- Population: Total; Catholics: 3,116,283; 461,209 (15%)

Information
- Denomination: Catholic
- Sui iuris church: Latin Church
- Rite: Roman Rite
- Established: March 2, 1968
- Cathedral: Cathedral of Saint Jude the Apostle
- Patron saint: Saint Jude

Current leadership
- Pope: Leo XIV
- Bishop: Gregory Parkes
- Metropolitan Archbishop: Thomas Wenski
- Vicar General: Msgr. Robert F. Morris
- Judicial Vicar: Fr. Joseph L. Waters
- Bishops emeritus: Robert Nugent Lynch

Map
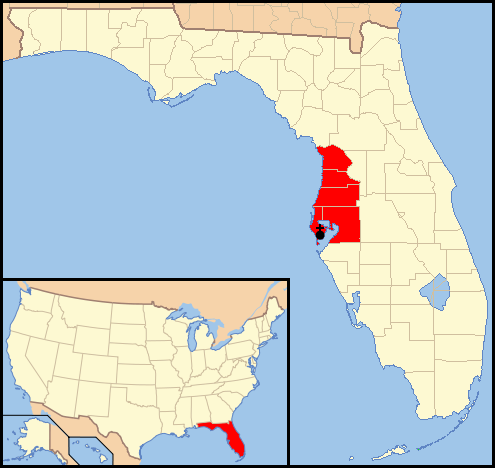

Website
- dosp.org

The Diocese of Saint Petersburg (Latin: Dioecesis Sancti Petri in Florida) is a diocese of the Catholic Church in the Tampa Bay region of Gulf Coast Florida. It is a suffragan diocese of the Archdiocese of Miami. Its Cathedral is St. Jude the Apostle Cathedral in St. Petersburg, Florida. The bishop is Gregory Parkes.

== Statistics ==
The Diocese of St. Petersburg comprises 3,177 square miles (8,230 km^{2}), encompassing Pinellas, Hillsborough, Pasco, Hernando, and Citrus counties. The principal cities are Tampa, St. Petersburg, and Clearwater.

As of 2023, the diocese had a total Catholic population of approximately 500,000, with 280,000 of them registered with the diocese.

As of 2026 the diocese encompasses 75 parishes, 4 missions, 1 shrine and 46 schools and early learning centers and celebrates Mass in 14 languages.

== History ==
=== Background ===
==== 1530 to 1800 ====
In 1539, Spanish explorer Hernando De Soto, hoping to find gold in Florida, landed near present-day Port Charlotte or San Carlos Bay. DeSoto led an expedition of 10 ships and 620 men. His company included 12 priests, there to evangelize the Native Americans. His priests celebrated mass almost every day. The De Soto expedition later proceeded to the Tampa Bay area and then into central Florida.

The Spanish missionary Luis de Cáncer arrived by sea with several Dominican priests in present-day Bradenton in 1549. Encountering a seemingly peaceful party of Tocobaga clan members, they decided to travel on to Tampa Bay. Several of the priests went overland with the Tocobaga while Cáncer and the rest of the party sailed to Tampa Bay to meet them. Arriving at Tampa Bay, Cáncer learned, while still on his ship, that the Tocobaga had murdered the priests in the overland party. Ignoring advice to leave the area, Cáncer went ashore, where he too was murdered. The Spanish attempted to establish another mission in the Tampa Bay area in 1567, but it was soon abandoned.

After the end of the French and Indian War in 1763, Spain ceded all of Florida to Great Britain for the return of Cuba. Given the antagonism of Protestant Great Britain to Catholicism, the majority of the Catholic population in Florida fled to Cuba. After the American Revolution, Spain regained control of Florida in 1784. In 1793, the Vatican changed the jurisdiction for Florida Catholics from the Diocese of Havana (erected in 1787 from the Diocese of Santiago de Cuba) to the Diocese of Louisiana and the Two Floridas, based in New Orleans.

==== 1800 to 1880 ====
After of the Louisiana purchase (1803), Florida returned in 1806 to the Diocese of Havana (until 1823). In the Adams–Onís Treaty of 1819, Spain ceded all of Florida to the United States, which established the Florida Territory in 1821.

In 1825, Pope Leo XII erected the Vicariate of Alabama and Florida, which included all of Florida, based in Mobile, Alabama. In 1858, Pius IX moved Florida into a new Apostolic Vicariate of Florida, which in 1870 was elevated into the Diocese of St. Augustine. The Tampa Bay region would remain part of this diocese for the next 98 years. The first Catholic parish in Tampa, St. Louis, was founded in 1859.

==== 1880 to 1900 ====
The Sisters of the Holy Names of Jesus and Mary founded the Academy of the Holy Names, a girls school in Tampa, in 1881. It was the first Catholic school on the Florida Gulf Coast. Arizona jurist Edmund F. Dunne established the Catholic colony of San Antonio in Pasco County in the early 1880s. The community originally allowed only practicing Catholics as residents; most of them were Irish and German immigrants. Its church, St. Anthony of Padua, was the first Catholic church in Pasco Country. A contingent of Benedictine monks arrived in San Antonio, Florida, in 1886 initially to serve German immigrants.

A yellow fever epidemic in Tampa in 1888 killed three of the priests in the area. Bishop John Moore then invited the Society of Jesus in New Orleans to assume control of the parishes in southern and central Florida. In succeeding years, as the area grew in population. the Jesuits established more parishes and schools. Benedictine monks and nuns entered the region in 1880s, founding Saint Leo Abbey in 1886 and Holy Name Priory in 1889, both in Saint Leo, Florida. The Sisters of St. Joseph, the Redemptorists and the Salesians also entered the diocese. In 1889, Bishop John Moore asked the Benedictines to establish several mission churches on the Florida Gulf Coast from Pasco County northward.

==== 1900 to 1968 ====
Saint Mary, Our Lady of Grace, founded in 1908, was the first Catholic parish in St. Petersburg. Sacred Heart was the first Catholic church in Pinellas Park. It was constructed with aid from the Catholic Extension in Chicago and from local Protestant churches. New Port Richey in 1919 saw its first parish open, Our Lady Queen of Peace. The first Catholic church in Clearwater, St. Cecilia, was dedicated in 1924. In 1931, the Franciscan Sisters of Allegany opened St. Anthony's Hospital in St. Petersburg. Today it is Baycare St. Anthony's Hospital. Three years later, they started St. Joseph's Hospital in Tampa. It is today Baycare St. Joseph's Hospital.

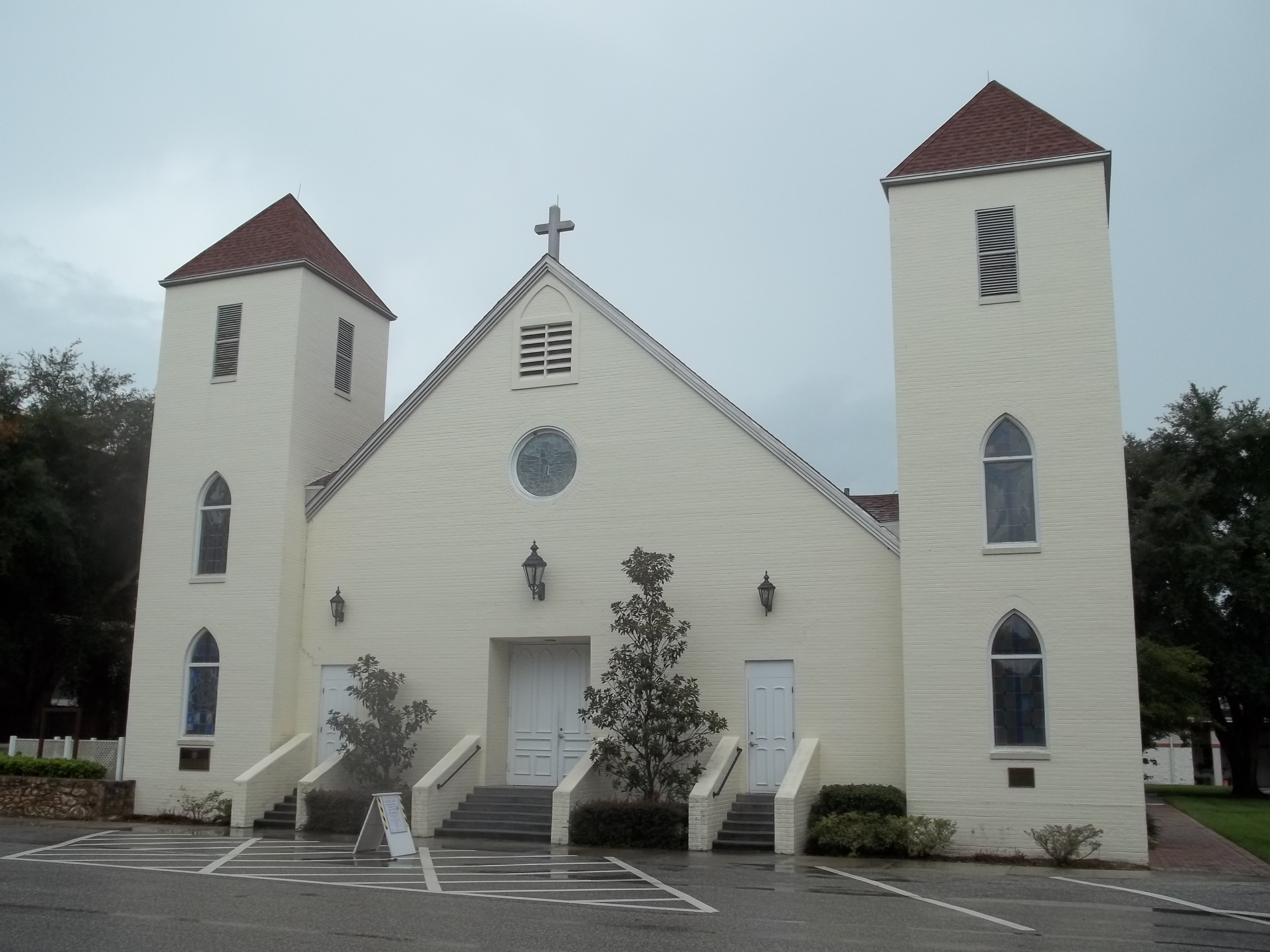
St. Anthony Church, San Antonio, Florida, (2011)

After the end of World War II in 1945, Bishop Joseph P. Hurley of St. Augustine started a massive program of purchasing property throughout Florida to develop new parishes for the increasing Catholic population. He also recruited many priests from the northern states and Ireland to serve in Florida. He founded over 40% of the parishes within the present Diocese of St. Petersburg. Nativity Catholic Church was established as a mission in Brandon in 1954. The first Catholic church in Largo, St Patrick's, was founded as a mission in 1957

=== Diocese of St. Petersburg ===
==== 1968 to 1980 ====
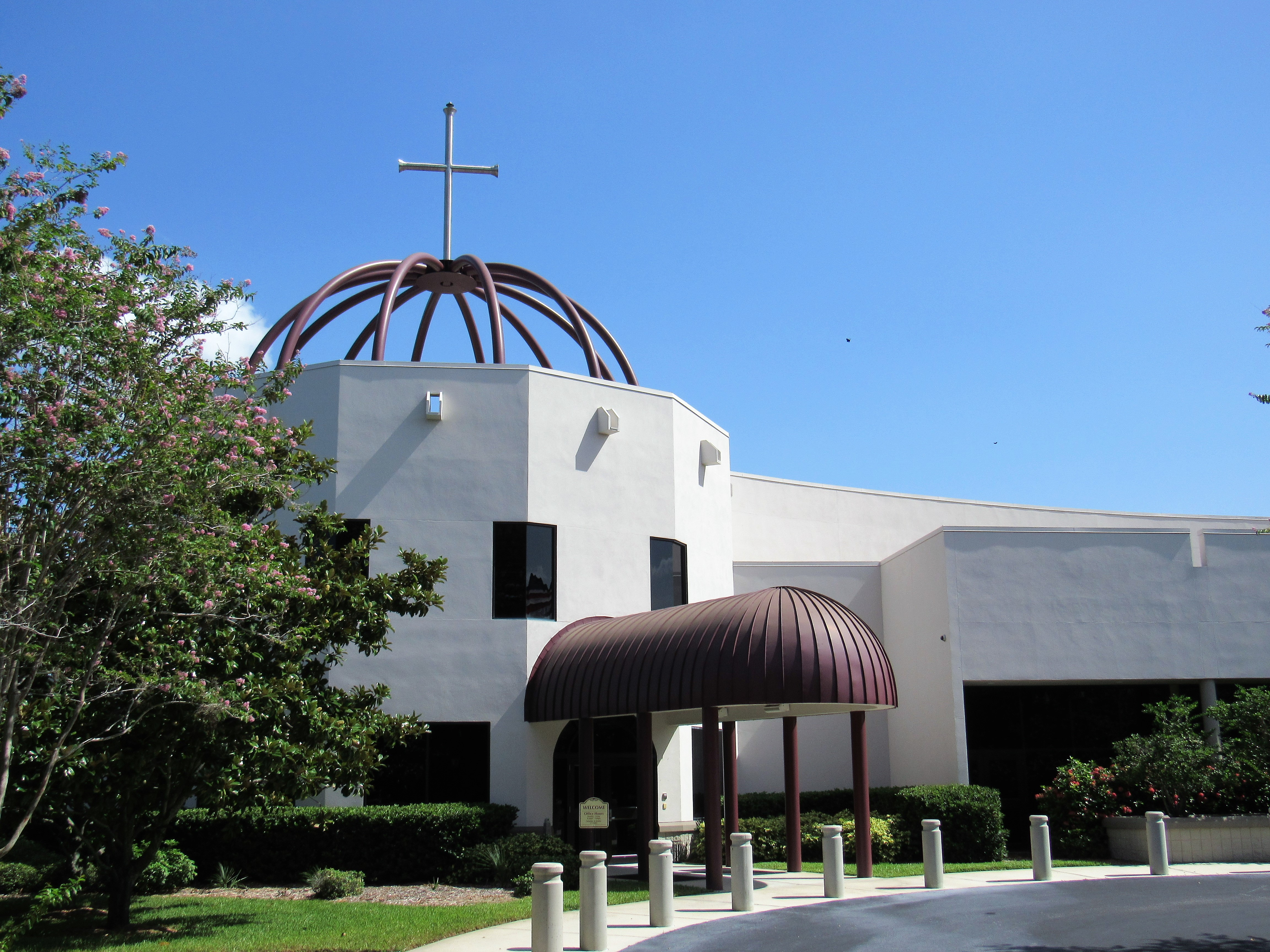
Bishop W. Thomas Larkin Pastoral Center, St. Petersburg, Florida (2017)

On June 17, 1968, Pope Paul VI erected the Diocese of St. Petersburg with territory taken from St. Augustine and the Diocese of Miami. The new diocese included most of the Florida Gulf Coast. He appointed Auxiliary Bishop Charles B. McLaughlin of the Diocese of Raleigh as the first bishop of St. Petersburg. The pope designated the Cathedral of St. Jude the Apostle in St. Petersburg as its seat.

McLaughlin's main task was to set up the new diocese. McLaughlin, a pilot, often flew from event to event, earning him the nickname "Hurricane Charlie." He died in 1978. Monsignor W. Thomas Larkin, the vicar general of the diocese and interim diocesan administrator, was appointed the second bishop of St. Petersburg by Pope John Paul II in 1979. Larkin established fifteen new parishes and three new schools.

==== 1980 to 2000 ====
In 1983, Larkin dedicated the diocese to the Immaculate Heart of Mary. John Paul II erected the Diocese of Venice in Florida in 1983, taking most of its territory from the Diocese of St. Petersburg. Larkin created new offices for African-American and Hispanic Catholics, along with an office for Catholics with disabilities. Larkin also worked on services for the needy and for those with HIV/AIDS, and was a strong advocate for ecumenicism. In 1988, St. Joan of Arc Parish opened in Spring Hill. Larkin retired as bishop of St. Petersburg in 1988.

John Paul II named Bishop John Favalora of the Diocese of Alexandria in Louisiana as the next bishop of St. Petersburg in 1989. He reorganized diocesan administrative functions and consolidated outreach programs. He started WLMS 88.3 FM to serve the northern area of the diocese. In 1993, Favarola declared a "A Year of Favor From The Lord" to celebrate the 25th anniversary of the erection of the diocese. In 1994, Favalora became archbishop of Miami.

In 1995, Robert N. Lynch became the fourth bishop of St. Petersburg. In the summer of 1998, Lynch inaugurated the Renew 2000 program to educated and motivate Catholic laity in the diocese. Later that year, he gave support to the Lay Pastoral Ministry Institute, a formal training program for the laity. Lynch also started a program to forgive the debt of parishes.

==== 2000 to present ====
In 2000, Lynch opened the Bishop W. Thomas Larkin Pastoral Center in St. Petersburg, consolidating ministries from throughout the diocese. The first diocesan synod was held in 2002 and the first eucharistic congress in 2003. He successfully completed the first capital campaign of the diocese. With this funding, Lynch opened Bishop McLaughlin Catholic High School in Spring Hill in 2003 and the Bethany Retreat Center in Lutz in 2007. Lynch also opened Pinellas Hope, a homeless shelter in Pinellas Park that evolved into a service center for the homeless.

After Lynch retired in 2016, Pope Francis that same year appointed Bishop Gregory Parkes of the Diocese of Pensacola-Tallahassee as his replacement. In 2018, Parkes consecrated the diocese to the Immaculate Heart of Mary.

== Mission ==
The diocese of St. Petersburg identifies it's mission as, "We, the Catholic Diocese of Saint Petersburg, are a joyful community of disciples proclaiming the Good News and inviting all people to encounter the love and mercy of Jesus Christ. The Diocese of Saint Petersburg includes all people in the counties of Pinellas, Hillsborough, Pasco, Hernando and Citrus. While many people identify as Catholic, it is also our “mission territory.”"

=== Pastoral Priorities ===
The Diocese of St. Petersburg casts its vision as "Courageously Living the Gospel" originating the Pastoral Plan for the diocese released in response to a public listening sessions held across the five counties after the current bishop, Bishop Parke's, installation. A new pastoral plan was released in 2025 outlining the current goals of the church organization entitled "A Call to Conversion."

Priority 1: We will place God first in all things

Priority 2: We will love as God loves and serve as God serves.

Priority 3: We will go and make disciples

=== Community Outreach ===
The diocese of St. Petersburg is responsible for a variety of social services through their Catholic charities arm. This work includes food, housing, shelters, financial assistance, immigration services, mental health counselling, pregnancy/adoption services, medical clinics, and disaster assistance.

== Sex abuse ==
In 2001, Bill Urbanski, the former diocesan spokesman, accused Bishop Lynch of inappropriate behavior during a business trip. Urbanski said Lynch bought him lavish gifts, forced to him to share a hotel room, grabbed his thigh at one point, and asked Urbanski to photograph him topless for a gag picture. The diocese denied any wrongdoing by Lynch, but paid Urbanski $100,000 in severance pay. Lynch apologized for his actions.

Robert L. Schaeufele, a diocesan priest, was arrested in Michigan in June 2002 on capital sexual battery charges from Pinellas County in Florida. Two men had accused him of giving them enemas when they were 11-years-old at Sacred Heart Church in Pinellas Park from 1983 to 1985. Schaeufele pleaded guilty in June 2003 to attempted capital sexual battery and was sentenced to 30 years in prison. Four of Schaeufele's victims sued the diocese in November 2003, claiming that it allowed him access to young children despite previous complaints about his behavior. By December 2003, seven lawsuits had been filed against the diocese regarding Schaeufele. In April 2004, the diocese reached a settlement with 12 victims of Shaeufele for $1.1 million.

Texas authorities arrested Gerry Appleby in March 2003 on a warrant from Pinellas County in Florida. Two men had accused the priest of sexually abusing them when they were minors at St. Ignatius of Antioch Catholic Parish in Tarpon Springs during 1978 or 1979. Appleby left Florida for Texas in 1979. A man had reported abuse by Appleby to the diocese in 1994; Appleby was laicized in 1995. In May 2004, Appleby pleaded guilty to attempted capital sexual battery and was sentenced to 12 years in prison.

In 2011, Lynch published a letter detailing how the diocese had spent $4.7 million since 1990 to settle sexual misconduct cases.

Salveston in 1980 wrote to Bishop Larkin, warning him about Huneke. Despite Salveson's complaints, the diocese did not remove Huneke from ministry in St. Petersburg until 1982. Huneke left the priesthood in 1989.

As of May 2020, the diocese lists nine priests and five lay workers as having credible accusations of sexual abuse of minors. The list does not include religious priests, brothers, or nuns.

In order to safe guard children from these injustices today, the diocese of St. Petersburg requires regular background checks and recurring training to detect signs of abuse/trauma of all staff and volunteers that work in proximity to minors or vulnerable adults. The diocese also employees a victims assistance coordinator to identify and assist anyone who may have been harmed in the past.

== Bishops ==
=== Bishops of St. Petersburg ===
1. Charles Borromeo McLaughlin (1968 – 1978)
2. William Thomas Larkin (1979 – 1988)
3. John Clement Favalora (1989 – 1994), appointed Archbishop of Miami
4. Robert Nugent Lynch (1995 – 2016)
5. Gregory Lawrence Parkes (2017 – present)

=== Other diocesan priest who became a bishop ===
David Leon Toups, appointed Bishop of Beaumont in 2020

== Coat of arms ==
Coat of arms of Diocese of Saint Petersburg
Notes Arms was designed and adopted when the diocese was erected Adopted 1968 Escutcheon The diocesan arms show an inverted Latin cross in a red and gold field. The four quarters contain a castle tower, a lion, an arrowhead and a halberd, or battle-ax Symbolism The inverted cross honors St. Peter, who was crucified upside down. The red and gold colors represent the Spanish explorers and missionaries in Florida. The castle tower and lion are part of the Coat of arms of the King of Spain. The arrowhead recognizes the Native American people of Florida. The halberd memorializes Jude the Apostle, who was killed with a halberd in Persia.

== Education ==
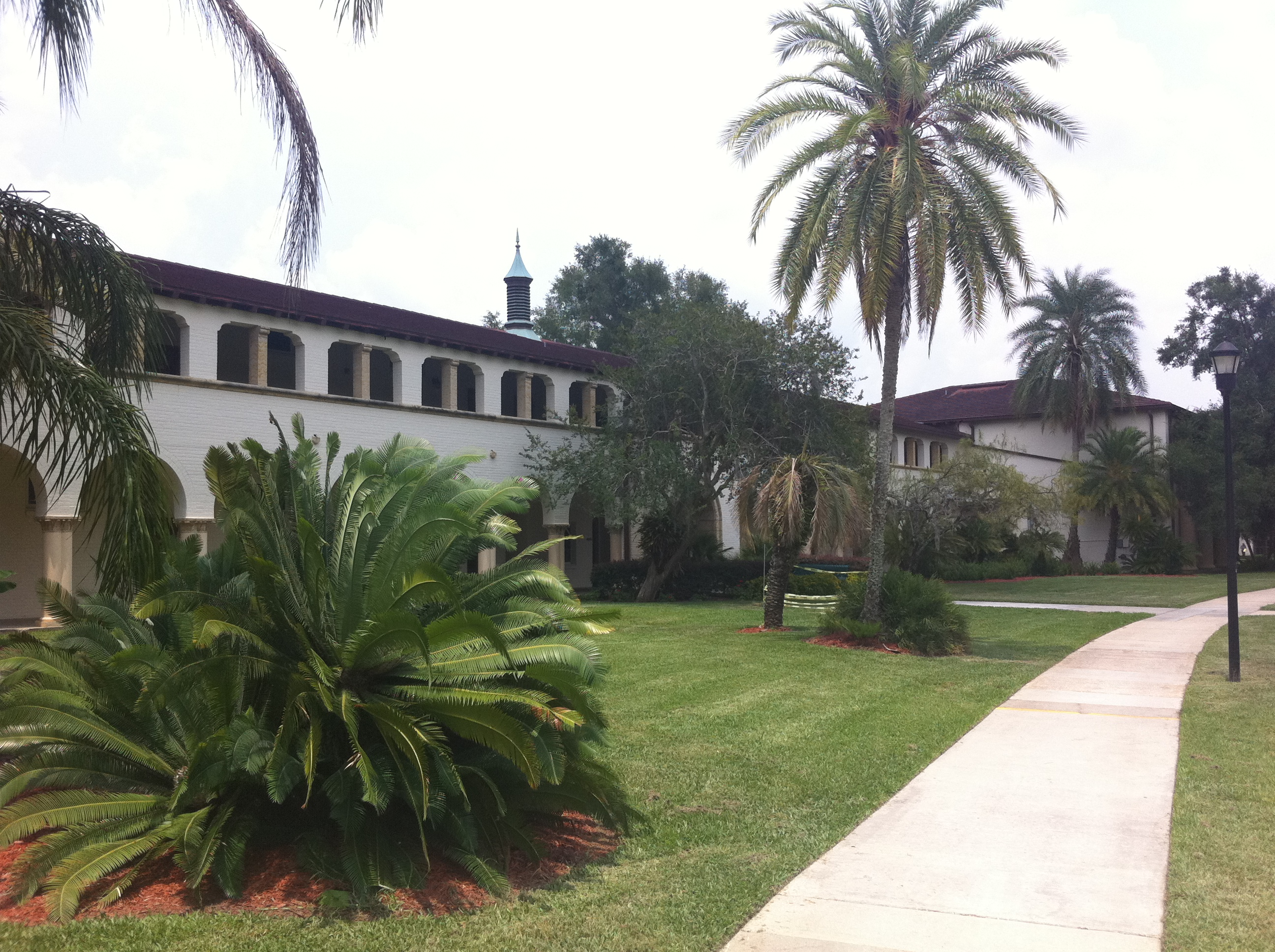
St. Leo University, St. Leo, Florida (2011)

As of 2023, the Diocese of St. Petersburg had 46 schools and early childhood centers along with two universities.

=== High schools ===
- Academy of the Holy Names – Tampa
- Bishop McLaughlin Catholic High School – Spring Hill
- Clearwater Central Catholic High School – Clearwater
- Jesuit High School – Tampa
- St. Petersburg Catholic High School – St. Petersburg
- Tampa Catholic High School – Tampa
