= David Girardi =

American football coach (born 1988)

Kansas City Chiefs
- Title: Quarterbacks coach

Personal information
- Born: September 26, 1988 (age 38); New Kensington, Pennsylvania, U.S.

Career information
- Position: Quarterback
- High school: St. Petersburg Catholic (St. Petersburg, Florida)
- College: Geneva (2007–2010)

Career history
- Seton Hill (2011–2012) Graduate assistant; Geneva (2013) Quarterbacks coach; Northwestern (2014) Offensive quality control coach; Northwestern (2015–2017) Defensive graduate assistant; Lafayette (2018) Quarterbacks coach; Kansas City Chiefs (2018–2020) Offensive quality control coach; Kansas City Chiefs (2021–2022) Assistant quarterbacks coach / Passing game analyst; Kansas City Chiefs (2023–present) Quarterbacks coach

Awards and highlights
- As coach: 3× Super Bowl champion (LIV, LVII, LVIII)

David Girardi (born September 26, 1988) is an American football coach who is the quarterbacks coach for the Kansas City Chiefs of the National Football League (NFL).

== Playing career ==
Girardi played at Geneva between 2007 and 2010. He started three years and finished with 5,997 passing yards and 37 touchdowns with a .572 completion percentage. He was inducted into the Geneva College Athletics Hall of Fame in 2022.

== Coaching career ==
=== College ===
Giraradi started out as a graduate assistant at Seton Hill. He later became the quarterbacks coach at his alma mater Geneva. He later coached at Northwestern from 2014 to 2017 as an offensive quality control coach and defensive graduate assistant. After that he was named the quarterbacks coach for Lafayette where he coached for one year in 2018.

=== Kansas City Chiefs ===
On January 29, 2018, the Chiefs hired Girardi as an offensive quality control coach. In 2019, Girardi won his first Super Bowl when the Chiefs defeated the San Francisco 49ers 31–20 in Super Bowl LIV. In 2021 he was promoted to assistant quarterbacks coach and passing game analyst. In 2022, Girardi won his second Super Bowl when the Chiefs defeated the Philadelphia Eagles 38–35 in Super Bowl LVII. On February 28, 2023, the Chiefs again promoted Girardi but this time to quarterbacks coach. In 2023, Girardi won his third Super Bowl when the Chiefs defeated the 49ers 25–22 in Super Bowl LVIII.
