= Bishop McLaughlin Catholic High School =

Private, Roman Catholic school in Spring Hill, Florida, United States

Location
- 13651 Hays Road; Spring Hill, (Pasco County), Florida 34610; United States
- 28°21′24″N 82°33′52″W

Information
- Type: Private, Roman Catholic
- Motto: Domine, dirige nos. "Lord, guide us."
- Religious affiliation: Roman Catholic
- Patron saint: St. Charles Borromeo
- Founded: 2003
- Founder: Bishop Robert Nugent Lynch
- School code: 101850
- Principal: Benjamin H. Moore
- Assistant Principal: Gary Schlereth
- Faculty: 29
- Grades: 9 - 12
- Gender: Co-educational
- Enrollment: 320
- Student to teacher ratio: 13:1
- Campus size: 88.76 acres
- Colors: Navy and Gold
- Athletics: FHSAA 3A
- Sports: Soccer, baseball, basketball, cheerleading, cross country, football, golf, softball, swimming, tennis, track, volleyball
- Team name: Hurricanes
- Accreditation: Southern Association of Colleges and Schools
- Affiliation: Diocese of St. Petersburg
- Website: www.bmchs.com

Bishop McLaughlin Catholic High School (BMCHS) is a private high school located in northern Pasco County, Florida, United States, not far from Spring Hill, in the Diocese of St. Petersburg. BMCHS is fully accredited by the Southern Association of Colleges and Schools (SACS), and also holds memberships in the National Catholic Education Association (NCEA) and the Florida High School Athletic Association (FHSAA).

== History ==
On January 20, 2000, the Diocese acquired the land for the future home of Bishop McLaughlin Catholic High School. On May 30, 2002, construction of the new BMCHS began. BMCHS was established in 2003. It is named after Charles Borromeo McLaughlin, the first Bishop of the Roman Catholic Diocese of St. Petersburg. An avid pilot, Bishop McLaughlin would meet the pastoral demands of a large diocese by flying from event to event in order to keep pace with his schedule. This fast-paced ministry affectionately earned him the nickname of "Hurricane Charlie." Therefore, BMCHS is the home of the "Hurricanes." On August 11, 2003, BMCHS welcomed its first freshman class. On May 29, 2007, commencement was held for the school's first graduating senior class.

== Academics ==
Bishop McLaughlin Catholic High School was ranked as the 7th-best Catholic High School in the state of Florida for 2020 by NICHE, with an overall grade of "A." In 2017, BMCHS's STREAM (Science, Technology, Religion, Engineering, Art and Math) Club won the Innovations in Catholic Education Technology Integration Award for its work in three-dimensional printing of prosthetic hands for children with limited upper limb mobility as a result of birth defect or injury, and was also honored by District Administration magazine as part of its Schools of TechXcellence program for this work. BMCHS is also one of the few private high schools in the Tampa Bay area to offer an Exceptional Student Education (ESE) program.

== Financial aid ==
Bishop McLaughlin Catholic High School offers various forms of financial assistance. Diocesan assistance includes the Catholic School Tuition Assistance Grant (C-STAG), Mary C. Forbes Foundation Scholarships and grants from the Catholic Foundation. BMCHS also accepts government-managed scholarships such as Step Up For Students, Gardiner Scholarships, AAA Scholarships and McKay Scholarships. BMCHS also manages several privately funded scholarships.

== Athletics ==
Bishop McLaughlin Catholic High School's athletic program is a Division 3A participating member of the Florida High School Athletic Association (FHSAA). BMCHS offers participation in competitive sports such as Football, Boys Basketball, Girls Basketball, Boys Baseball, Girls Softball, Girls Volleyball, Boys Boys Soccer, Girls Soccer, Swimming, Track & Field, Cross-Country Running, Tennis and Cheerleading. Known as "Thee Beach at Bishop," BMCHS also has one of the largest Beach Volleyball facilities in Florida, including 10 regulation-size sand volleyball courts.

In late 2021, BMCHS received sanctions from the FHSAA regarding the Football, Baseball, and Boys' Basketball teams, citing "improper contact with student-athletes, impermissible benefits and athletic recruiting" that took place under the watch of athletic director Rex Desvaristes, dating back to September of the previous year. The fines levied totaled $70,000. Violations of FHSAA rules included "two student-athletes with grade point averages below 2.0 take part in 11 interscholastic contests and another student-athlete playing in eight interscholastic contests despite being in high school for a fifth year" This resulted in the firing of three coaches from the three athletic programs concerned. The football team received a three-year ban from all FHSAA-sanctioned events, though this ban was rescinded in early 2022.

== Performing arts & activities ==
Bishop McLaughlin's facilities include an 880-seat state-of-the-art theater known as the Eleanor Dempsey Performing Arts Center (EDPAC). The EDPAC hosts school events (such as plays, musicals, concerts and speaking engagements), and is recognized as being a public entertainment venue by live entertainment ticket sales and distribution companies such as Ticketmaster and Live Nation Entertainment. Clubs, societies and activities include Student Government, National Honor Society, Yearbook, STEM Club, SADD (Students Against Destructive Decisions), Key Club, Teen Court, Student Ambassadors, Peer Ministry, Show Choir and Drama Club.

== Notable alumni ==
- Frank German (2015), MLB pitcher
- Nate Pearson (2015), MLB pitcher
- Dillon Mitchell (2022 - transferred), basketball player for the Boston Celtics in the NBA, and the St. John's Red Storm in college
- Emanuel Sharp (2022), Israeli-American basketball player who played for the Houston Cougars in college

== Notable faculty ==
- Derrick Sharp, American-Israeli basketball coach
