= Charles Borromeo McLaughlin =

American prelate of the Roman Catholic Church

His Excellency, The Most Reverend Charles Borromeo McLaughlin
- Bishop of St Petersburg; Titular Bishop of Risinium
- See: Diocese of Saint Petersburg
- Successor: William Thomas Larkin
- Previous post: Auxiliary Bishop of Raleigh (1964 to 1968)

Orders
- Ordination: June 6, 1941 by Francis Spellman
- Consecration: April 15, 1964 by Vincent Stanislaus Waters

Personal details
- Born: September 28, 1913 New York City, New York, US
- Died: December 14, 1978 (aged 65) St. Petersburg, Florida, US
- Motto: Ubi caritas ibi Deus (Where there is love, there is God)

Charles Borromeo McLaughlin (September 28, 1913 – December 14, 1978) was an American prelate of the Roman Catholic Church. He served as the first bishop of the new Diocese of Saint Petersburg in Florida from 1968 to 1978. He previously served as an auxiliary bishop of the Diocese of Raleigh in North Carolina from 1964 to 1968.

== Biography ==
=== Early life ===
Charles McLaughlin was born on September 28, 1913, in the Bronx borough of New York City. After completing seminary, McLaughlin was ordained a priest of the Archdiocese of New York by Cardinal Francis Spellman in New York City on June 6, 1941. McLaughlin later served as pastor of Our Lady of Grace Parish in Greensboro, North Carolina.

=== Auxiliary Bishop of Raleigh ===
McLaughlin was named titular bishop of Risinium and auxiliary bishop of the Diocese of Raleigh by Pope Paul VI on January 13, 1964. McLaughlin received his episcopal consecration at Our Lady of Grace Church in Greensboro, North Carolina, on April 15, 1964, from Bishop Vincent Waters. McLaughlin, a licensed pilot, often flew from one church event to another, earning him the nickname "Hurricane Charlie."

=== Bishop of St. Petersburg ===
On May 8, 1968, Paul VI established the Diocese of St. Petersburg, with McLaughlin as its first bishop. He was installed on June 17, 1968. The newly created diocese stretched from Crystal River to Ft. Myers, encompassing eleven Florida counties. His first task was to establish a new diocesan structure to unify priests, personnel, policy, and people from the two dioceses. He also faced the challenge of dealing with the rapidly increasing population within his diocese. McLaughlin implemented the reforms of the Second Vatican Council.

Charles McLaughlin died in St. Petersburg on December 14, 1978.Bishop McLaughlin Catholic High School, a private, Catholic school in Spring Hill, Florida, is named for him. Knights of Columbus Assembly 1818 in Venice, Florida, bears his name as well.

Catholic Church titles
Preceded by None	Bishop of St. Petersburg; 1968-1978	Succeeded by William Thomas Larkin
