= Sts. Peter & Paul Catholic Church (Miami) =

Church in Florida, United States

Coordinates: 25°45′37″N 80°12′44″W

Sts. Peter & Paul Church is located at 900 S.W. 26th Road, in Miami, Florida.

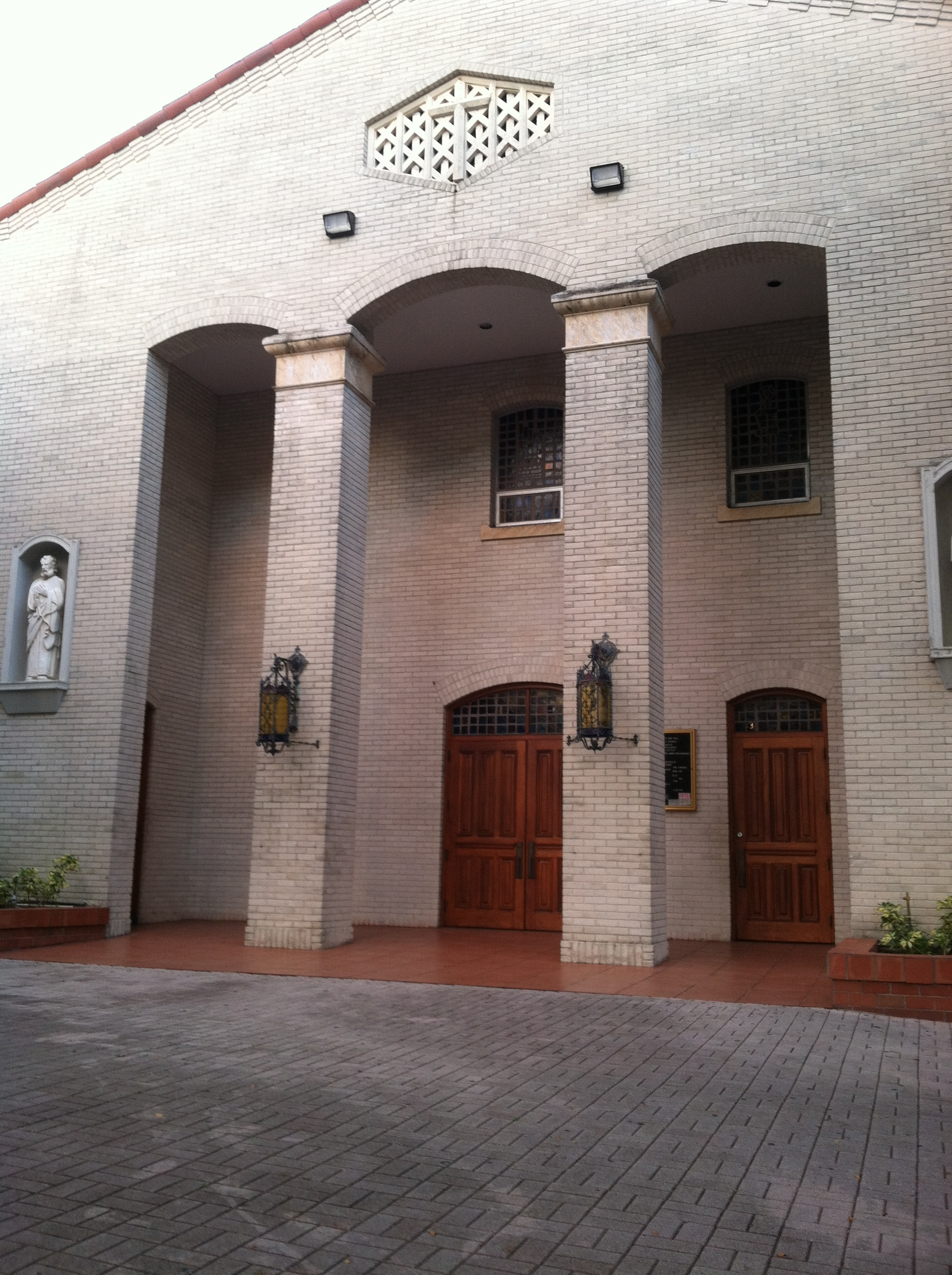
Sts. Peter and Paul Catholic Church

== History ==
The Sts. Peter & Paul Parish was established on December 25, 1939. The church building was completed and dedicated in February 1940. Father Juan M. Lopez has been pastor since 1989.

The school opened on September 15, 1941, with an enrollment of 300 students in grades 1 through 9. The school added a grade each year. There were 17 graduates in the first high school graduation in 1946. There were 650 students in 1945 and 1200 in 1962.

The last high school graduation was in 1956. There were 47 high school graduates that year. The school has continued having 8th grade graduations.

In 2023, Amanda Padierne Delgado, NBCT, Ed.S., Class of 1995 Alumni returned to her Alma Mater as Principal.

== Controversy ==
In February 2018 the school received criticism from parents, community members, and human rights groups after it fired a popular teacher because that teacher married a same-sex partner.

== Leadership ==
Below are lists of individuals who have led the church and school since their founding.

=== Church Pastors ===
- Rev. Robert P. Brennan
- Rev. Francis J. Dunleavy
- Msgr. Bryan Walsh
- Rev. Thomas Barry
- Rev. Vincent Tyson
- Rev. Jose Luis Paniagua
- Rev. Juan La Calle
- Fr. Federico Capdepón V.F.
- Rev. Gilberto Fernandez
- Rev. Juan M. Lopez
- Fr. Luis Flores

=== School Principals ===
- Sister St. John Colee, SSJ. (1941–1945)
- Sister M. Evangelista Slaid, SSJ. (1945, 1946 & 1947)
- Sister Marie de Lourdes Ortego, SSJ. (1948, 1949, 1950 & 1951)
- Sister Mary Ambrose (1952 & 1953)
- Sister Mary Herbert Rogero, SSJ. (1954, 1955 & 1956)
- Sister Frances Joseph, SSJ. (1957–1960)
- Sister St. Charles Bagwell, SSJ. (1960–1962)
- Sister Louis Angela O'Donnovan, SSJ. (1962–1968)
- Sister Dorothy Flowers, SSJ. (1968–1970)
- Sister Marie Carmela, SSJ. (1970–1972)
- Sister Mary Eleanor Callaghan, SSJ. (1972–1988)
- Sister M. Trinita McCarthy, SSJ. (1988–1993)
- Sister Mary Eleanor Callaghan, SSJ. (1993–2001)
- Dr. Carlota E. Morales, EdD (2001–2019)
- Mrs. Jocelyn Zlatkin, Ed.S (2019-2023)
- Mrs. Amanda Padierne Delgado, Ed.S. (2023- 2026)
