= William Thomas Larkin =

American prelate

His Excellency, The Most Reverend William Thomas Larkin
- Bishop of St. Petersburg
- Church: Roman Catholic Church
- See: Diocese of St. Petersburg
- Predecessor: Charles Borromeo McLaughlin
- Successor: John Clement Favalora

Orders
- Ordination: May 15, 1947 by Walter Foery
- Consecration: May 27, 1979 by Pope John Paul II

Personal details
- Born: March 31, 1923 Mount Morris, New York, US
- Died: November 4, 2006 (aged 83) Clearwater, Florida, US
- Education: St. Bernard Seminary; Angelicum University
- Motto: Omnia per ipsum (Everything through him)

William Thomas Larkin (March 31, 1923 – November 4, 2006) was a prelate of the Roman Catholic Church who served as bishop of the Diocese of St. Petersburg in Florida from 1979 to 1988.

== Biography ==
=== Early life ===
William Larkin was born in Mount Morris, New York, on March 31, 1923. He attended St. Andrews and St. Bernard seminaries in Rochester, New York.

=== Priesthood ===
Larkin was ordained as a priest in Syracuse, New York, at the Cathedral of the Immaculate Conception for the Diocese of St. Augustine on May 15, 1947, by Bishop Walter Foery.

After his ordination, Larkin served in a parish in Daytona Beach, Florida. He then studied at the Angelicum University in Rome, where he became a roommate of the future Pope John Paul II. Larkin help him study English. Larkin received a Doctor of Sacred Theology degree in 1949.

After returning from Rome in 1949, Larkin was assigned to work in the chancery of the Diocese of St Augustine. In 1951, he became associate pastor of Holy Family Parish in North Miami. Florida. He was transferred in 1954 to become pastor of Christ the King Parish in Jacksonville, Florida.Larkin became pastor in 1967 of St. Cecilia Parish in Clearwater, Florida, then part of the Diocese of St Augustine. also serving as vicar general of the diocese.

In 1968, Pope Paul VI erected the Diocese of St. Petersburg, taking territory from the Diocese of St. Augustine and the Archdiocese of Miami. At the same time, Larkin was incardinated, or transferred, into the new diocese. After the death of Bishop Charles McLaughlin in 1978, Larkin served as apostolic administrator of St. Petersburg.

=== Bishop of St. Petersburg ===
Larkin was appointed as the second bishop of St. Petersburg by John Paul II on April 18, 1979. He was consecrated on May 27, 1979, by the pope in Saint Peter's Basilica in Rome. During Larkin's tenure as bishop, the diocese added 15 new parishes, three new schools, and a radio station (WBVM 90.5 FM). He created new offices for African-American and Hispanic Catholics, along with an office for Catholics with disabilities. Larkin also worked on services for the needy and for those with HIV/AIDS, and was a strong advocate for ecumenicism.

=== Retirement and legacy ===
On November 29, 1988, John Paul II accepted Larkin's resignation as bishop of St. Petersburg for health reasons. William Larkin died of leukemia in Clearwater, Florida, on November 4, 2006, at age 83. Bishop Larkin Catholic School in Port Richey, Florida is named in his honor. The Bishop W. Thomas Larkin Pastoral Center in St. Petersburg is also named after him. He was a bishop of 24 years.

== Episcopal succession ==
Catholic Church titles
Preceded by Charles Borromeo McLaughlin	Bishop of St. Petersburg; 1979-1988	Succeeded by John Clement Favalora
