= Robert Nugent Lynch =

American prelate

His Excellency, The Most Reverend Robert Nugent Lynch
- Bishop Emeritus of St. Petersburg
- Church: Catholic Church
- Archdiocese: Miami
- Diocese: St. Petersburg
- Appointed: December 5, 1995
- Installed: January 26, 1996
- Retired: November 27, 2016
- Predecessor: John Clement Favalora
- Successor: Gregory Parkes

Orders
- Ordination: May 13, 1978 by Edward Anthony McCarthy
- Consecration: January 26, 1996 by John Favalora, Edward A. McCarthy, and Paul Marcinkus

Personal details
- Born: May 27, 1941 (age 85) Charleston, West Virginia, US
- Education: Pope St. John XXIII National Seminary
- Motto: Pro amicis suis (For his friends)

Styles of Robert Nugent Lynch
- Reference style: His Excellency; The Most Reverend
- Spoken style: Your Excellency
- Religious style: Bishop

Robert Nugent Lynch (born May 27, 1941) is an American prelate of the Roman Catholic Church, who served as bishop of the Diocese of St. Petersburg in Florida from 1996 to 2016.

== Biography ==
=== Early life ===
Robert Lynch was born on May 27, 1941, in Charleston, West Virginia. He grew up in Montgomery, West Virginia, to an Irish-American family that expected him to become a priest. Lynch soon entered the Pontifical College Josephinum. However, he found the college to be a dark, rigid place with strict rules and limited communication with his family. Eventually, Lynch dropped out and started working as an English teacher.

Lynch's next job was as a lobbyist in Washington, D.C., representing the Ohio Catholic Conference at the United States Conference of Catholic Bishops (USCCB). His roommates were priests; their positive actions inspired him to reconsider the priesthood. Lynch entered the Pope St. John XXIII National Seminary in Weston, Massachusetts, graduating with a Master of Divinity degree in May, 1978.

=== Priesthood ===
On May 13, 1978, Lynch was ordained a priest at the Cathedral of Saint Mary in Miami, Florida, by Archbishop Edward Anthony McCarthy for the Archdiocese of Miami in Charleston. After his ordination, Lynch served as associate pastor of St. James Parish in North Miami, Florida, and rector and president of St. John Vianney College Seminary in Miami. His last assignment before becoming bishop was in Fort Lauderdale, Florida, as the second pastor of St. Mark the Evangelist Parish.

=== Bishop of St. Petersburg ===
On December 5, 1995, Pope John Paul II appointed Lynch as the fourth bishop of St. Petersburg to fill the vacancy left by then Bishop John Favalora. Lynch was consecrated and installed at the Cathedral of Saint Jude the Apostle in St. Petersburg, Florida, on January 26, 1996. Favalora served as principal consecrator with Archbishop Edward McCarthy and Archbishop Paul Marcinkus serving as principal co-Consecrators.

Lynch served terms as the general secretary of the United States Catholic Conference (USCC) and the National Conference of Catholic Bishops (NCCB).

On June 6, 1998, Lynch was appointed as apostolic administrator of the Diocese of Palm Beach, while remaining the bishop of St. Petersburg. He took over after John Paul II removed the existing bishop, Bishop Joseph Symons, for sexual abuse crimes. Lynch remained as administrator in Palm Beach until November 12, 1998, when Bishop Anthony O'Connell was installed there as bishop.

Lynch continued the reorganization and management of the Diocese of St. Petersburg begun under Bishop Favalora. He commissioned the building of the Bishop W. Thomas Larkin Pastoral Center in St. Petersburg, which was dedicated on March 31, 2000, He also took an active role in planning for the future construction of new Catholic high schools, and improvements to the existing schools.

On June 2, 2011, Lynch published a letter detailing how the diocese had spent $4.7 million since 1990 to settle sexual misconduct cases. In 2001, Bill Urbanski, the diocese spokesman, accused Lynch of inappropriate behavior during a business trip. Urbanski said Lynch bought him lavish gifts, forced to him to share a hotel room, grabbed his thigh, and asked Urbanski to photograph him topless for a gag picture. The diocese denied any wrongdoing and paid Urbanski $100,000 severance. Lynch apologized for his actions.

=== Retirement and legacy ===
Pope Francis accepted Lynch's resignation as bishop of Petersburg on November 28, 2016, and named Bishop Gregory Parkes as his successor.

== See also ==
- Catholic Church hierarchy
- Catholic Church in the United States
- Historical list of the Catholic bishops of the United States
- List of Catholic bishops of the United States
- Lists of patriarchs, archbishops, and bishops

Catholic Church titles
Preceded by John Clement Favalora	Bishop of St. Petersburg; 1996–2016	Succeeded by Gregory Parkes
