= Academy of the Holy Names (Florida) =

Location
- 3319 Bayshore Boulevard; Tampa, (Hillsborough County), Florida 33629; United States; 27°54′53″N 82°29′37″W

Information
- Type: Private
- Motto: "Esse Quam Videri" (To be, rather than to seem.)
- Religious affiliation: Roman Catholic
- Established: July 17, 1881
- Founder: Sisters of the Holy Names of Jesus and Mary
- President: Kevin Whitney
- Principal: Bridgid Fishman (ES); Jeane McNamara (HS)
- Grades: PK to 12
- Gender: Co-ed (PK-8); Girls (9-12)
- Campus size: 19 acres (77,000 m^{2})
- Colors: Navy Blue and Gold
- Mascot: Jaguar
- Team name: Jaguars
- Accreditation: Cognia, Florida Council of Independent Schools, Florida Catholic Conference, Florida Kindergarten Council
- Publication: Accord (school magazine)
- Newspaper: Achona
- Yearbook: Echoes
- Website: www.holynamestpa.org

The Academy of the Holy Names in Tampa, Florida, is a Catholic, coeducational elementary school and a college preparatory high school for young women, sponsored by the Sisters of the Holy Names of Jesus and Mary. It is the oldest Catholic school on Florida's West Coast and the second oldest high school in the state.

== Athletics ==
The Academy has earned at least one state championship:

- Women's Swimming: 2022 (Class 2A)

== Notable former students ==
- Juana Bordas, Nicaraguan–American community activist
- Argentina Díaz Lozano, Honduran journalist and novelist
- Kayleigh McEnany, former White House press secretary, political commentator, and writer
- Colleen Moore, silent film actress
