= Clearwater Central Catholic High School =

Private school in Clearwater, Florida, US

Location
- 2750 Haines Bayshore Road; Clearwater, Florida 33760; United States; 27°55′49″N 82°43′25″W

Information
- Type: Private, Coeducational
- Motto: Tolle Lege (Latin: "Take Up and Read")
- Denomination: Roman Catholic
- Established: 1962
- Founder: Archbishop Joseph Hurley
- Oversight: Diocese of St. Petersburg
- President: Dr. John Venturella
- Principal: Jim Deputy
- Grades: 9–12
- Gender: co-educational
- Language: English
- Campus size: 40 Acres
- Colors: Red and Gold
- Athletics: Football, Soccer, Baseball, Basketball, Softball, Cross Country, Track & Field, Cheerleading, Golf, Swimming & Diving, Wrestling, Flag Football, Lacrosse
- Athletics conference: FHSAA, Class 3A, Class 1A
- Team name: Marauders
- Accreditation: Southern Association of Colleges and Schools
- Publication: Silent Epiphanies (literary magazine)
- Newspaper: The Central Voice
- Yearbook: Praedator
- Affiliation: Sisters of Notre Dame (1971-2009)
- Alumni: Dean Spanos
- Admissions Director: Tara Shea McLaughlin
- Athletic Director: Craig Everhart
- Campus Minister: Andrew Shannon
- Website: http://www.ccchs.org

Clearwater Central Catholic High School is a private college preparatory school for grades 9 through 12 and located in Clearwater, Florida, in the Roman Catholic Diocese of Saint Petersburg. Founded in 1962, the school enrolls approximately 500 students from the Tampa Bay area. Clearwater Central Catholic High School is an international IB World School.

Clearwater Central Catholic's mascot is the Marauder and the school's motto is Tolle Lege (Latin:"Take up and read"), a phrase from Book 8 of Saint Augustine's Confessions.

== History ==
The school was founded in February 1962 with the groundbreaking of its first building. CCC opened its doors in September 1963 with a seven-member staff and an enrollment of 96 students. In 1964, the first graduating class consisted of 26 students. The school has been awarded Blue Ribbon School of Excellence status.

== Sports ==
CCC athletes and teams have won 325 District, Sectional and Regional Championships. Teams representing the school have participated in 92 Final Four’s with 21 state runner-up finishes and a total of 36 State Championships. Individual athletes have participated in FHSAA Championship events and have won 21 individual State Championships. When looking at team and individual appearances after winning District Championships, CCC’s athletic program has appeared 475 times in FHSAA Championship events. In the school years of 1999-2000 and 2003-2004 CCC received from the FHSAA the Fred E. Rozelle Sportsmanship Award recognizing schools that exhibit exemplary sportsmanship during the regular season and FHSAA Championships. The Athletic Program has been recognized by the St. Petersburg Times in 1996-1997 with the "All Sports Award" and by the Florida Athletic Coaches Association and the Florida High School Activities Association in 1977-1978, 1978-1979, and 1979-1980 for having the "Most Successful Athletic Program in the State".

== Notable alumni ==
- Joe Belfiore (graduated 1986) — business executive
- Riley Cooper (graduated 2006) — American football player
- Kyle Curinga (graduated 2012) — soccer player
- Brooke Magnanti (graduated 1992) — scientist and author
- Colin McCarthy (graduated 2006) — American football player
- Jerjuan Newton (graduated 2019) — American football player
- Johnny Newton (graduated 2020) — American football player
- Jeff Smith (graduated 2015) — American football player
- David Toups (graduated 1989) — Catholic bishop
- Ryan Webb (graduated 2004) — baseball player
- Ryan Weber (graduated 2008) — baseball player
