= Cathedral of Saint Jude the Apostle (St. Petersburg, Florida) =

- Location in Florida Cathedral of Saint Jude the Apostle (the United States)
- 27°46′40″N 82°42′49″W
- Location: 5815 Fifth Avenue North; St. Petersburg, Florida
- Country: United States
- Denomination: Roman Catholic Church
- Website: cathedralalive.org

History
- Founded: December 12, 1950
- Founder: Rev. Paul Manning
- Dedicated: June 2, 1963
- Consecrated: September 12, 2013

Architecture
- Functional status: Cathedral/Parish
- Style: Modern
- Completed: 1963, 2013 (major renovation)

Administration
- Diocese: St. Petersburg

Clergy
- Bishop: Most Rev. Gregory Parkes
- Rector: Rev. Thomas T. Morgan
- Vicar: Msgr. Michael Carruthers

The Cathedral of Saint Jude the Apostle is a Roman Catholic cathedral located in St. Petersburg, Florida, in the United States. It is the seat of the Diocese of St. Petersburg.

== History ==
=== St. Jude the Apostle Church ===
During the 1940's, the Tampa Bay area was part of the Diocese of St. Augustine in northern Florida. At this time, the Pinellas County area had five parishes, but they were not enough to serve its booming population. In 1950, the diocese purchased a swampy property in the City of St. Petersburg for a new church. The parish, to be called St. Jude the Apostle, was organized that same year. The name was suggested by a parishioner who had prayed to St. Jude Thaddeus for his son's recovery after a serious car crash.

The first mass for the new parish was celebrated in February 1951 at the Admiral Farragut Academy in St. Petersburg. In April 1951, the groundbreaking for St. Jude the Apostle, a combination church and auditorium, was held. The first mass was held in the new building in October 1951 and its was dedicated in January 17, 1952. The parish soon acquired a nearby house to serve as its rectory.

In 1953, the parish broke ground for combination school and church building to meet the growth of the parish. The church would occupy the first floor and the school the second floor. The second St. Jude Church was dedicated in 1954. However, after a few years, planning was started for a dedicated church building.The groundbreaking for the third St. Jude's Church was held in 1961. The church was dedicated on June 2, 1963.

=== Cathedral of St. Jude the Apostle ===
When Pope Paul VI established the Diocese of Petersburg on March 2, 1968, St. Jude the Apostle Church became the Cathedral of St. Jude the Apostle.

The diocese in 1980 installed a carilion sound system. The next year, a parish center was constructed. In 1984, the diocese converted the original church and auditorium building into the Our Lady’s Chapel, a devotional chapel for small ceremonies and events. In 1997, the cathedral acquired a new pipe organ and a new rectory was constructed. A new school building was dedicated in 2007.

In 2008, the diocese began soliciting input on the first major renovation of St. Jude. The project started in May 2012. A major part of the project was installing four steel beams in the cathedral ceiling to provide more structural support for the roof and removing the pillars around the sanctuary. The diocese also installed new pews, floors and altar. The project was completed in September 2013.

Images of cathedral campus

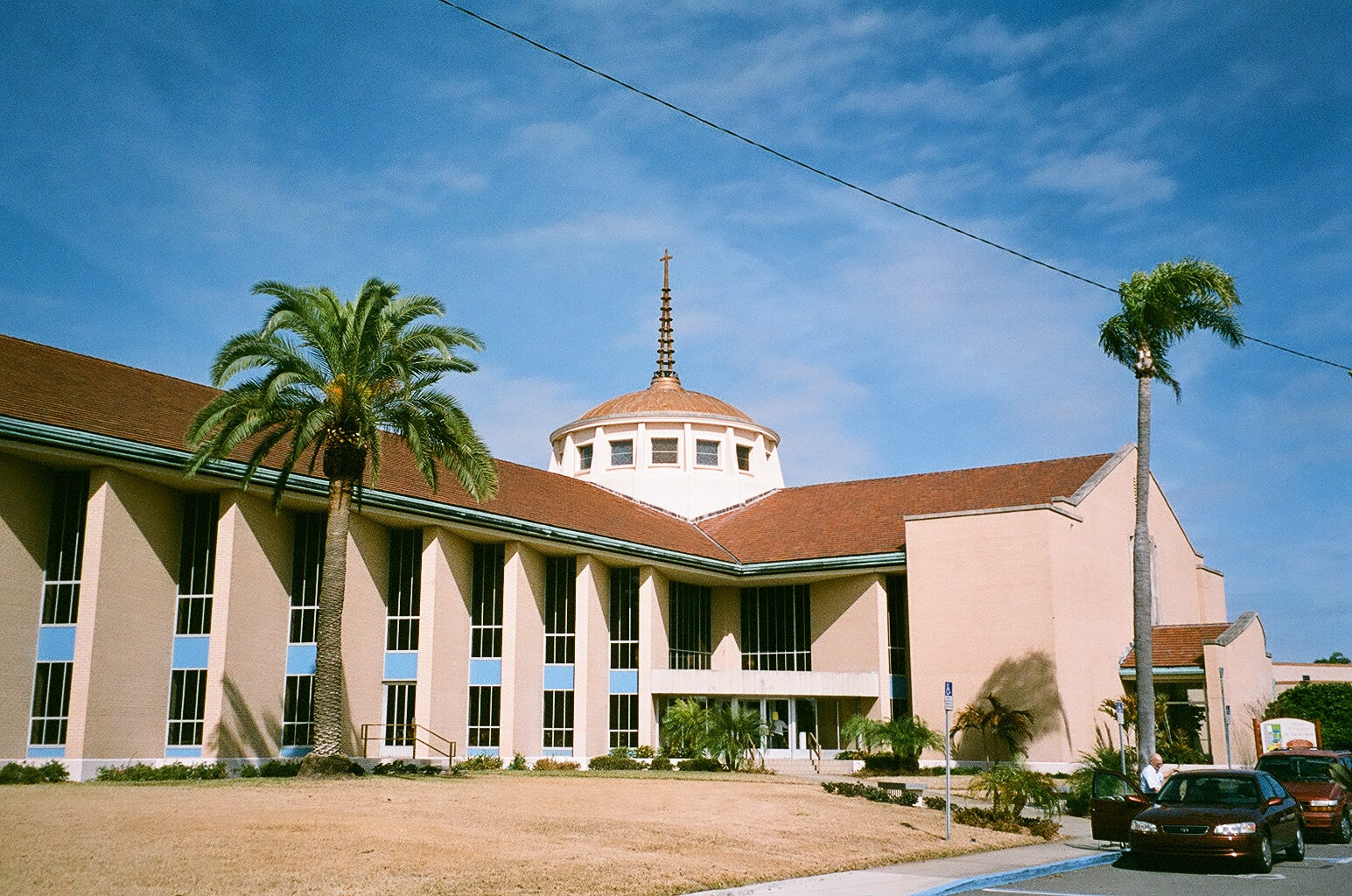
Cathedral before 2013 renovation (2010)

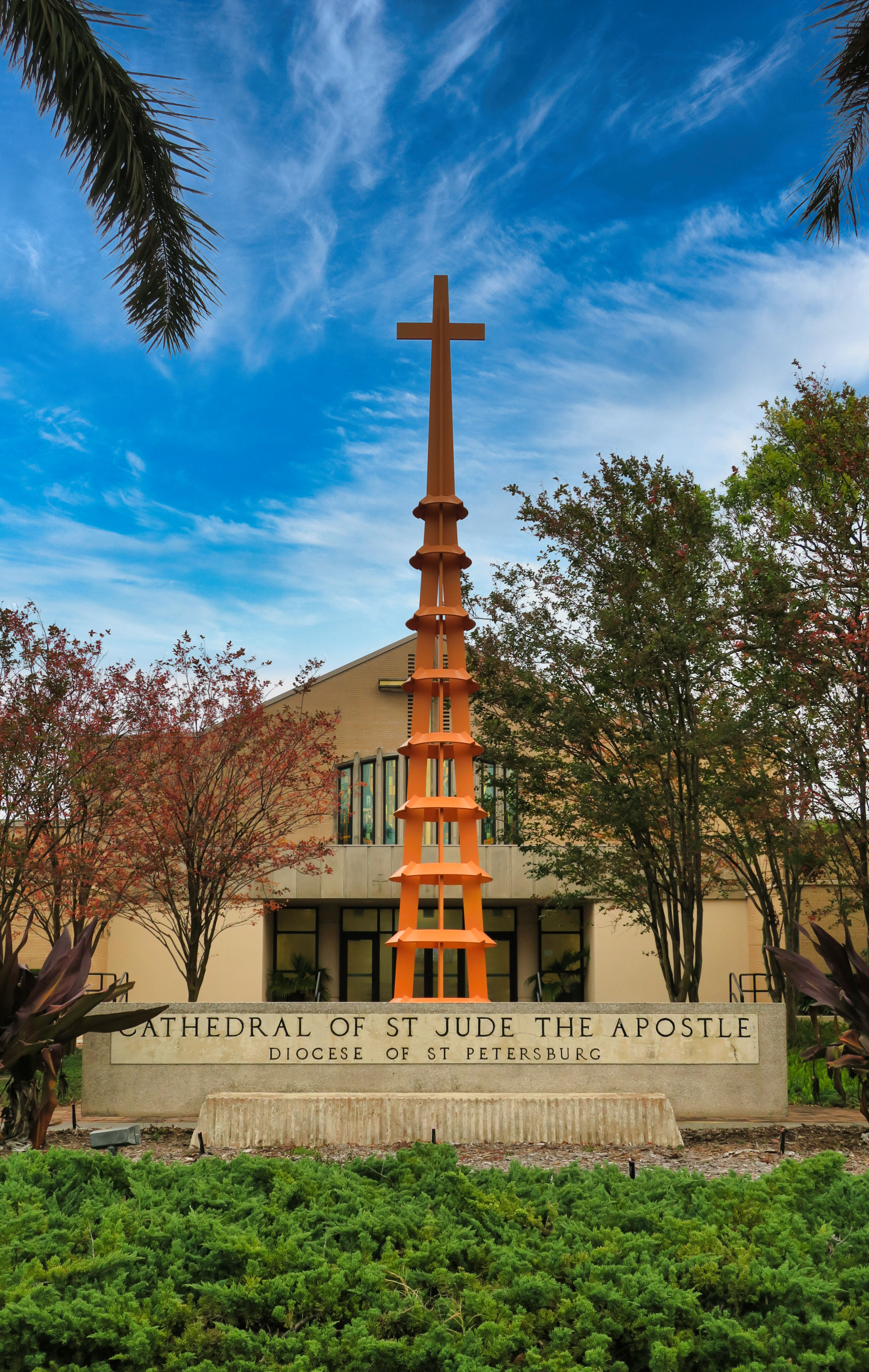
Cathedral after 2013 renovation (2025)

Cathedral interior (2019)

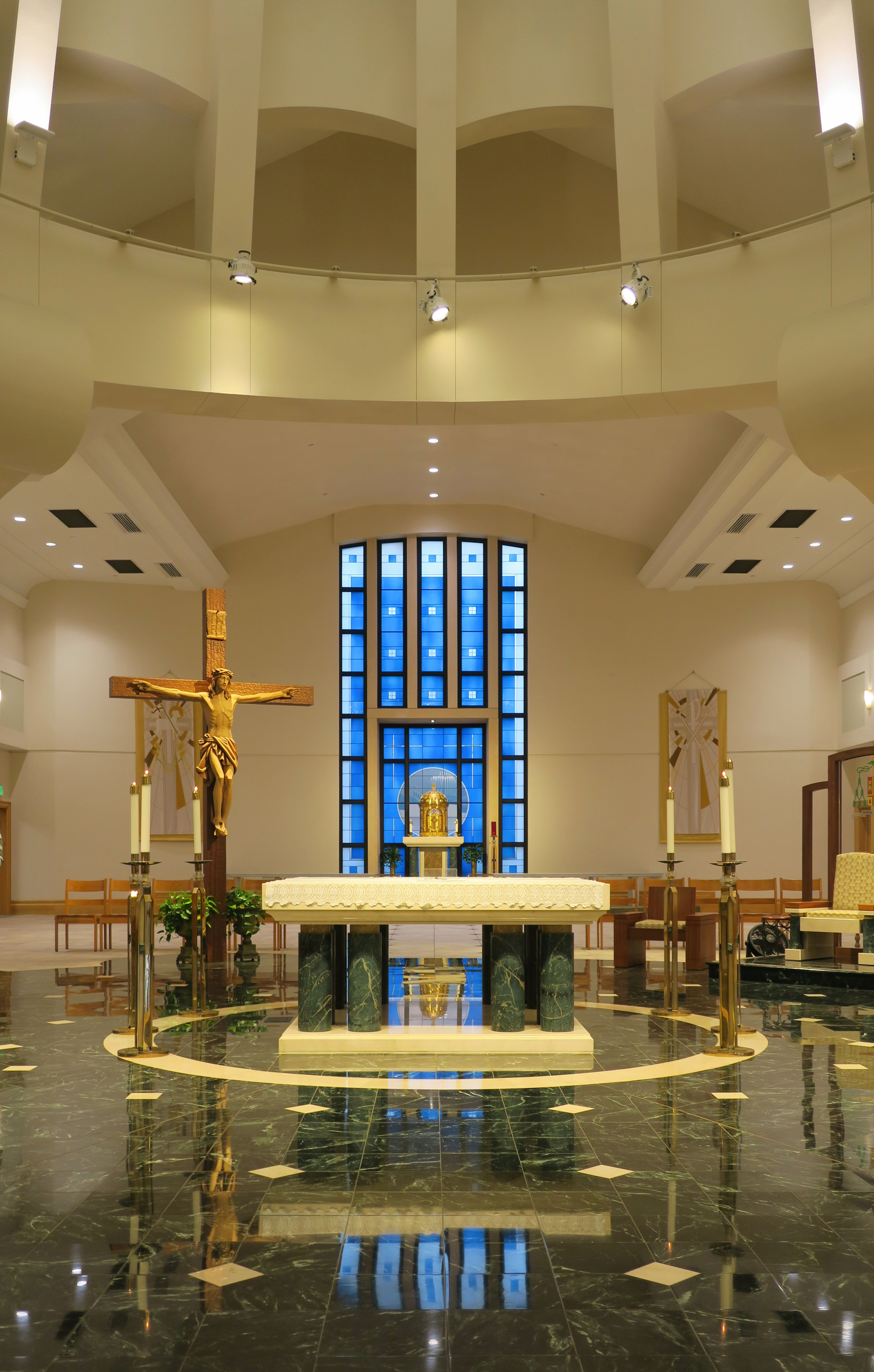
Sanctuary, cathedral (2025)

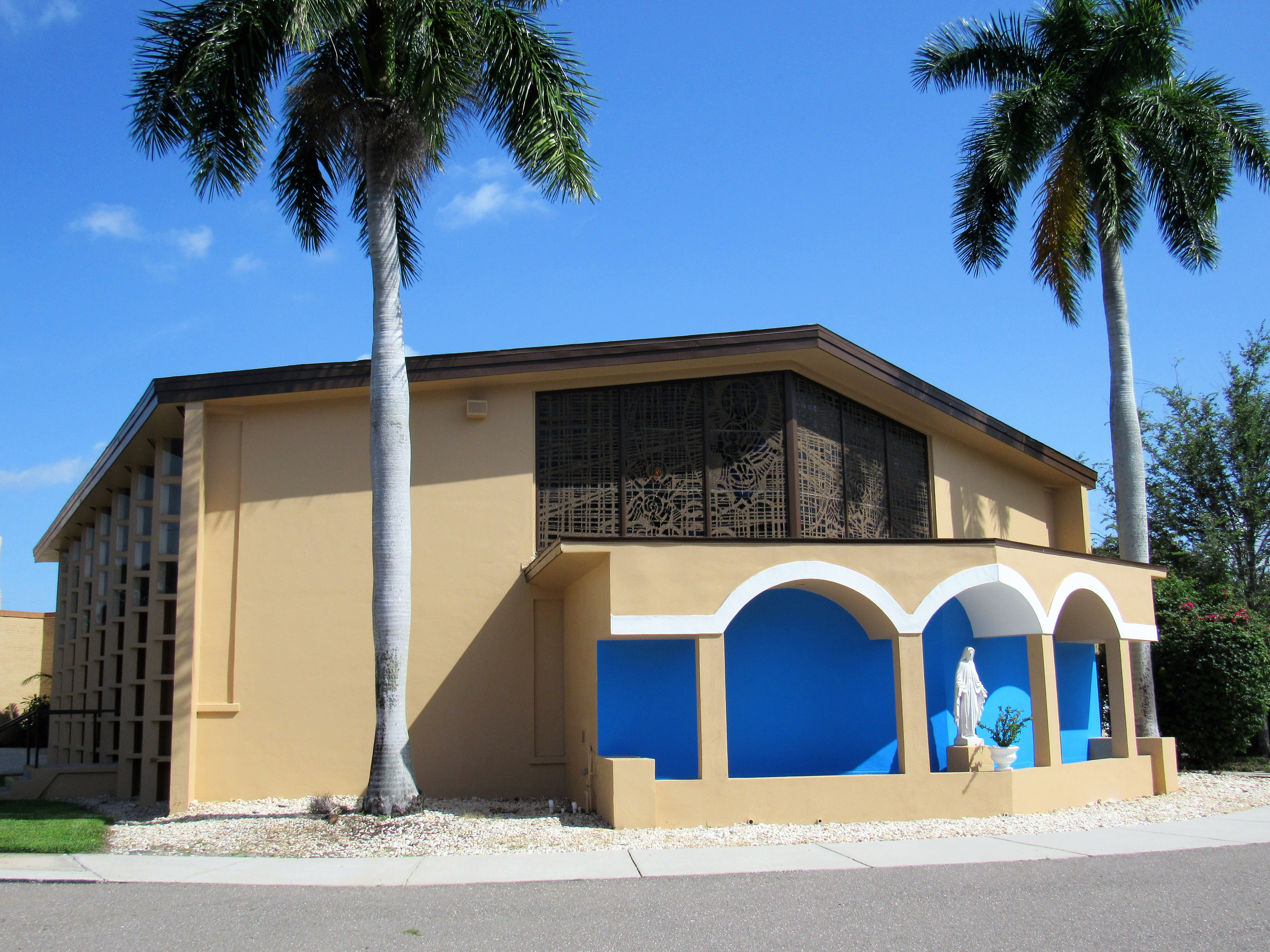
Our Lady's Chapel (2017)

== See also ==
- List of Catholic cathedrals in the United States
- List of cathedrals in Florida
