= Holy Name (disambiguation) =

Holy Name of Jesus is a Christian devotion to the name of Jesus.

== Feast days ==
- Feast of the Holy Name of Jesus, a Christian feast day, celebrated by a number of denominations
- Feast of the Holy Name of Mary, a Roman Catholic church feast day

== Places of worship ==
- Cathedral of the Holy Name, Mumbai, the Roman Catholic cathedral in the Indian city of Mumbai (Bombay)
- Holy Name of Jesus Parish (Stamford, Connecticut), a church in Stamford, Connecticut
- Holy Name of Jesus Church (Stratford, Connecticut), a church in Stratford, Connecticut
- Holy Name Cathedral, Brisbane, a Roman Catholic church in Queensland, Australia
- Holy Name Cathedral, Chicago, the seat of the Roman Catholic Archdiocese of Chicago, Illinois, United States
- The Holy Name of Jesus, Manchester, a former Jesuit church in Manchester, UK
- Holy Name of Jesus Church in San Francisco
- Holy Name of Jesus R.C. Church, a Roman Catholic church in New York City, New York
- Santissimo Nome di Maria (disambiguation), multiple churches
- Holy Name of Jesus Complex, a church in Massachusetts
- Holy Name of Jesus Cathedral (disambiguation), multiple churches
- Holy Name of Jesus Church (Redlands, California), a catholic church in Redlands, California.

== Prayers ==
- Litany of the Holy Name, a Christian prayer about the name of Jesus

== Religious societies ==
=== Anglican ===
- Community of the Holy Name, a community for women with autonomous provinces in Lesotho, the United Kingdom, and South Africa
- Community of the Holy Name (Australia), an Anglican religious order for women
- Chita che Zita Rinoyera (Order of the Holy Name), a community for women, based at Mutare in Zimbabwe

=== Roman Catholic ===
- Augustinian Province of the Most Holy Name of Jesus of the Philippines, missionaries in the Philippines.
- Sisters of the Holy Names of Jesus and Mary, the teaching order founded at Longueuil, Quebec, Canada.
- Society of the Holy Name, formally "Confraternity of the Most Holy Name of God and Jesus", a lay fraternity of the Dominican Order

== Schools ==
=== Canada ===
- Holy Name of Mary College School, an independent Catholic university preparatory girls' day school in Mississauga, Ontario
- Holy Name of Mary Catholic Secondary School, a regional girls' high school in Brampton, Ontario, formerly located in Mississauga
- Holy Names High School (Windsor), a Catholic high school in Windsor, Ontario

=== Trinidad and Tobago ===
- Holy Name Preparatory, a private primary school in Port of Spain, Trinidad and Tobago

=== United States ===
- Academy of the Holy Names, Albany, New York, a Catholic, college-preparatory girls' school
- Academy of the Holy Names, Tampa, Florida, a Catholic co-educational elementary school and girls' high school
- Holy Name Central Catholic High School, a Catholic high school in Worcester, Massachusetts
- Holy Name High School, a Catholic high school in Parma Heights, Ohio
- Holy Name High School (Reading, PA)
- Holy Name of Jesus Catholic School, a Catholic day school in Indialantic, Florida
- Holy Name School, a Catholic grade school in Birmingham, Michigan
- Holy Names Academy, a Catholic girls' high school in Seattle, Washington
- Holy Names High School (Oakland), a Catholic girls' school in Oakland, California
- Holy Names University, a Catholic university in Oakland, California
- Holy Name of Jesus Catholic School, a Catholic private day school
- Province of the Most Holy Name of Jesus (Western), a province of the Dominican order

== Other uses ==
- Pierce v. Society of Sisters of the Holy Names of Jesus and Mary, an important early 20th century United States Supreme Court decision

== See also ==
- Church of the Holy Name of Jesus (disambiguation)
- Jesus (name), a given name
- Names and titles of Jesus in the New Testament
- Names of God
- Nomina sacra, the abbreviation of several divine names
- Hare Krishna (mantra)
