= Holy Name Church =

Holy Name Church or Holy Name Catholic Church or Church of the Holy Name may refer to:

in Australia

- Holy Name Cathedral, Brisbane - Roman Catholic church in Queensland, Australia

in Canada

- Church of the Holy Name, Toronto

in India

- Cathedral of the Holy Name, Mumbai - a Roman Catholic cathedral in the Indian city of Mumbai (Bombay) and the seat of the Bombay Diocese

in New Zealand

in the United Kingdom

- The Holy Name Church Manchester - a Jesuit church in Manchester, UK

in the United States

(by state)

- Church of the Holy Name (Stamford, Connecticut), listed on the National Register of Historic Places (NRHP) in Fairfield County
- Holy Name Cathedral, Chicago - the seat of the Roman Catholic Archdiocese of Chicago, Illinois
- Church of the Holy Name (Topeka, Kansas), listed on the NRHP in Shawnee County
- Holy Name Church Rectory, Convent and School, Louisville, Kentucky, listed on the NRHP in Jefferson County
- Holy Name of Jesus Complex, Worcester, Massachusetts, listed on the NRHP in Worcester County
- Holy Name Church, Fall River, Massachusetts
- Holy Name Church - a Roman Catholic church in Birmingham, Michigan
- Holy Name Catholic Church (Kansas City, Missouri), listed on the NRHP in Jackson County
- Holy Name of Jesus R.C. Church - a Roman Catholic church in New York City, New York

== See also ==
- Holy Name (disambiguation)
