= Church of the Holy Name of Jesus (disambiguation) =

The Church of the Holy Name of Jesus (Church of the Gesù) is the mother church of the Society of Jesus (Jesuits).

Church of the Holy Name of Jesus or Holy Name of Jesus Church may also refer to:

== United Kingdom ==
- Church of the Holy Name of Jesus, Manchester, a Grade I listed building in England

== Canada ==
- Holy Name of Jesus Catholic Church (Kingston, Ontario), church in Ontario, Canada

== United States ==
- Holy Name of Jesus Church (San Francisco), a parish of the Archdiocese of San Francisco, California
- Holy Name of Jesus Parish (Stamford, Connecticut), a church in Stamford, Connecticut
- Holy Name of Jesus Church (Stratford, Connecticut), a church in Stratford, Connecticut
- Holy Name of Jesus Catholic Church (Indialantic, Florida), a Roman Catholic parish
- Holy Name of Jesus Roman Catholic Church (Manhattan), a church in New York City
- Holy Name of Jesus Church (New Orleans) on the campus of Loyola University New Orleans

== See also ==
- Holy Name Cathedral (disambiguation)
- Holy Name of Jesus Cathedral (disambiguation)
