= Holy Names School =

Holy Name School or Holy Names School may refer to:

== Canada ==
- Holy Name of Mary Catholic Secondary School, Brampton, Ontario
- Holy Name of Mary College School, Mississauga, Ontario
- Holy Names High School (Windsor, Ontario), Windsor, Ontario

== United States ==
- Holy Name Central Catholic High School, Worcester, Massachusetts
- Holy Name High School, Parma Heights, Ohio
- Holy Name High School (Reading, Pennsylvania), Reading, Pennsylvania
- Holy Name Parish School, West Roxbury, Massachusetts
- Holy Names Academy, Seattle, Washington
- Holy Names High School (Oakland, California), Oakland, California
- Holy Name of Jesus Catholic School, Indialantic, Florida
- Holy Name School, Birmingham, Michigan
