= Academy of the Holy Names =

Academy of the Holy Names may refer to:

- Academy of the Holy Names (Albany, New York)
- Academy of the Holy Names (Florida), in Tampa
- Academy of the Holy Names (Silver Spring, Maryland)

== See also ==
- Holy Names Academy, Seattle, Washington
- Holy Names High School (disambiguation)
- Holy Name (disambiguation)
