= James Gaffney =

James Gaffney may refer to:

- James Anthony Gaffney (1928–2016), British civil engineer
- James E. Gaffney (1868–1932), American owner of the Boston Braves
- James J. Gaffney (1863–1946), American architect
- James J. Gaffney III (born 1942), American attorney and politician
- James Gaffney (politician) (1853–1913), Australian politician for the Electoral district of Lyell
