= St. James Catholic Church (Louisville, Kentucky) =

Historic church in Kentucky, United States

- St. James Roman Catholic Church, Rectory, and School
- U.S. National Register of Historic Places
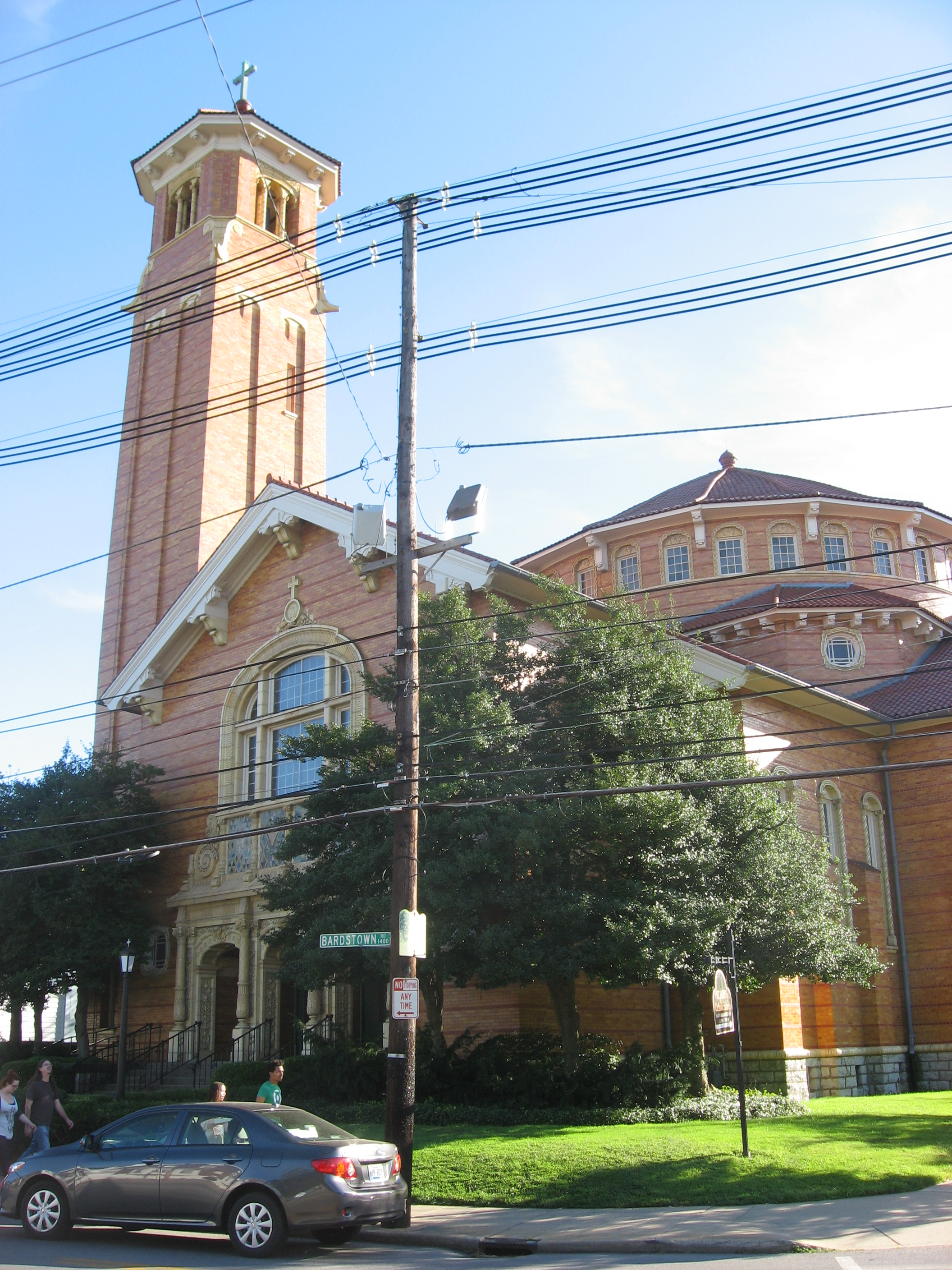
- Front of the church

- Location within Kentucky Location within the United States
- Location: 1430 Bardstown Rd., 1826 and 1818 Edenside Ave. Louisville, Kentucky
- Coordinates: 38°13′55″N 85°42′40″W
- Built: 1913
- Architect: J.J. Gaffney
- Architectural style: Byzantine Revival, Baroque Revival
- Website: www.stjameslou.org
- NRHP reference No.: 82002722
- Added to NRHP: March 1, 1982

St. James Church is a historic Roman Catholic church located at 1826 Edenside Avenue in the Highlands section of Louisville, Kentucky. March 1, 1982, it was listed on the National Register of Historic Places as St. James Roman Catholic Church, Rectory, and School.

== History ==
The parish of St. James was established in 1906 as the subdivisions in the surrounding area were rapidly being built up (three churches within a few blocks of St. James also trace their foundation to 1906). An initial wood-frame church was built in 1906 on the site of the present building, as was a wood-frame school building which was replaced with the modern brick school building in 1924. The parish house was completed in 1929.

Construction began on the modern church building in 1912 and was completed in 1913. It was designed by J.J. Gaffney, a local architect who designed buildings such as the Belvoir Apartments in Cherokee Triangle, the baroque house on Highland Avenue, Adath Jeshuran Temple and Holy Name Church.
