= Wight and Wight =

American architectural firm

Nelson Atkins Museum (before the 2007 remodeling)

Wight and Wight, known also as Wight & Wight, was an architecture firm in Kansas City, Missouri, United States, consisting of the brothers Thomas and William Wight. The firm designed several landmark buildings in Missouri and Kansas.

The brothers worked for McKim, Mead and White for 10 years. Thomas moved to Kansas City in 1904 and joined a firm with Edward T. Wilder. William joined the firm in 1911 and Wilder retired in 1916.

The firm achieved its greatest in fame in the late 1920s and early 1930s creating large Neoclassical structures which have become Kansas City landmarks.

== Selected works ==
Notable structures:

- Nelson-Atkins Museum of Art
- Kansas City City Hall
- Kansas Governor's Mansion
- Kansas City Livestock Exchange
- Approaches to the Liberty Memorial
- Jackson County Courthouse in Kansas City
- Clay County, Missouri Courthouse
- Wyandotte County, Kansas Courthouse
- Kansas City Life Insurance headquarters
- William Allen White home Red Rocks (now the William Allen White State Historic Site)

Works listed on the U.S. National Register of Historic Places include (with NRHP attribution):

- Central National Bank, 701–703 Kansas Ave. Topeka, Kansas (Wight & Wight)
- Harwelden, 2210 S. Main St. Tulsa, Oklahoma (Wight & Wight)
- Holy Name Catholic Church, 2800 E. 23rd St. Kansas City, Missouri (Wight & Wight)
- Frank Hughes Memorial Library, 210 E. Franklin St. Liberty, Missouri (Wight & Wight)
- Kirkwood Building, 1737-41 McGee St. Kansas City, Missouri (Wight and Wight)
- George H. Nettleton Home, 5125 Swope Parkway Kansas City, Missouri (Wight & Wight)
- George E. Nicholson House, 1028 W. 58th St. Kansas City, Missouri (Wight & Wight)
- Pickwick Hotel, Office Building, Parking Garage and Bus Terminal, 901-937 McGee St., 301-311 E. 9th St., 300-310 E. Tenth St., 906-912 Oak St. Kansas City, Missouri (Wight and Wight)
- U.S. Courthouse and Post Office-Kansas City, Missouri, 811 Grand Blvd. Kansas City, Missouri (Wight & Wight)
- Wyandotte County Courthouse, 710 N. 7th St. Kansas City, Kansas (Wight and Wight)
- One or more works in the South Liberty Courthouse Square Historic District, 2 S. Main St., 10 E. Kansas St., 1--17 E. Kansas St. Liberty, Missouri (Wight & Wight)
- Our Lady of Perpetual Help Redemptorist Church, 3333 Broadway Blvd. Kansas City, Kansas (Wight and Wight)
