= Holy Name Cathedral =

Holy Name Cathedral or the Cathedral of the Holy Name are the names of several cathedrals.

- Holy Name Cathedral, Brisbane (never completed)
- Holy Name Cathedral, Chicago
- Holy Name Cathedral, Mumbai
- Holy Name Cathedral (Steubenville, Ohio)

== See also ==
- Holy Name of Jesus Cathedral (disambiguation)
