= Cedar Crest (mansion) =

Historic house in Kansas, United States

- U.S. National Register of Historic Places
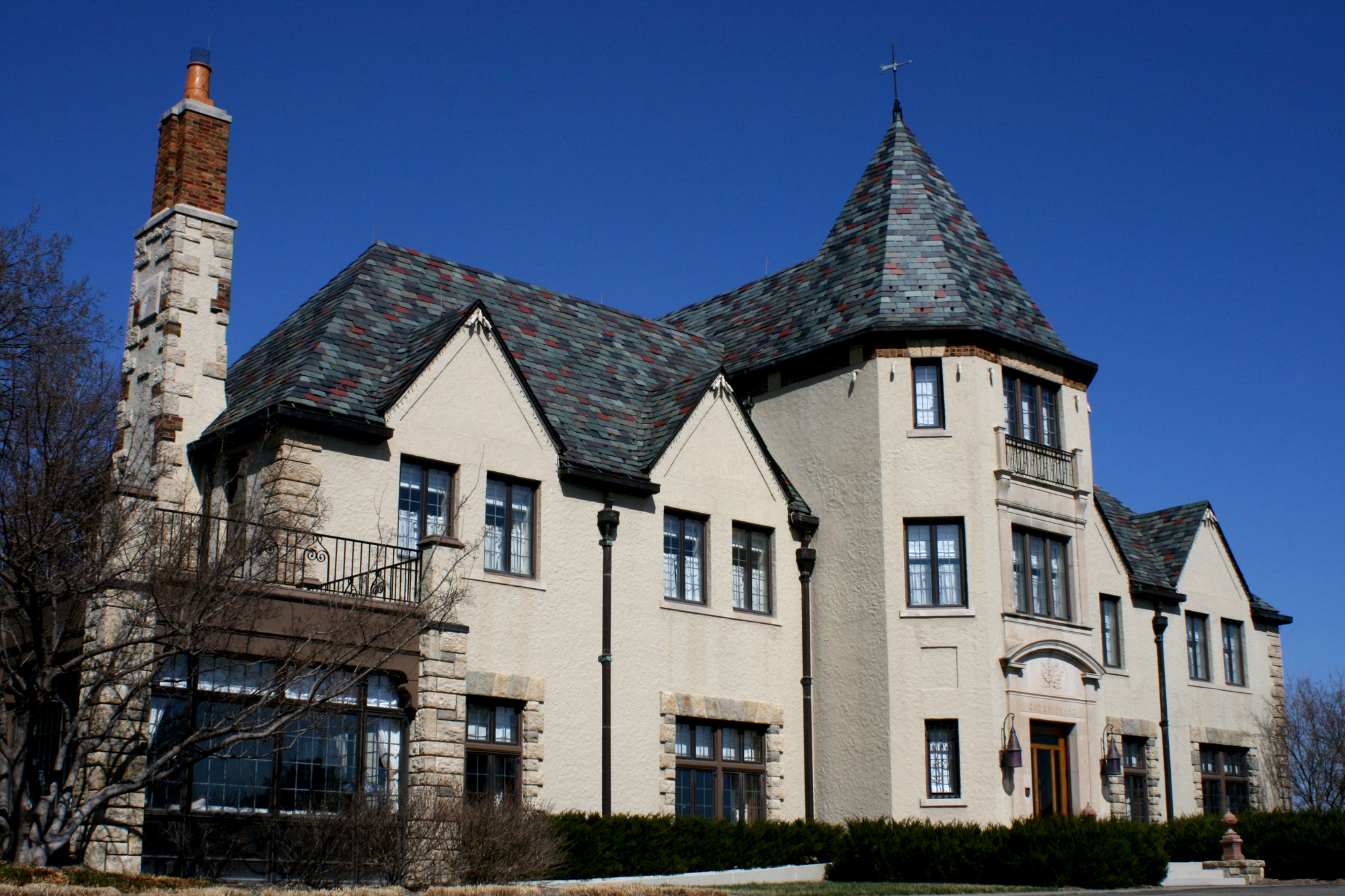

- Location within Kansas Location within the United States
- Location: Topeka, Kansas, U.S.
- Coordinates: 39°03′56″N 95°44′44″W
- Built: 1928
- Architect: William D. Wight
- Architectural style: French Normandy
- NRHP reference No.: 82002672
- Added to NRHP: May 6, 1982

The Kansas Governor's Residence, also known as Cedar Crest, is the official residence of the governor of Kansas. Built in 1928 and bequeathed to the state in 1955, it became the governor's residence in 1962.

== History ==
Kansas did not have an official governor's residence until 1901 when the state bought 801 Buchanan Street (a house originally built in 1887). The property was auctioned off in 1963, and the building was demolished in 1964. Portions of the building including bay windows, an oak staircase and balcony were incorporated in the downtown Ramada Inn, which was built in another part of Topeka in 1964.

Cedar Crest is on a hilltop on the west side of Topeka overlooking the Kansas River, and was designed by the architectural firm of Wight and Wight in 1928 for Topeka State Journal and Emporia News newspaper publisher Frank P. MacLennan. MacLennan died in 1933; when his widow died in 1955, she bequeathed Cedar Crest to the state of Kansas with the condition it be utilized as a home for the governor of Kansas. The gift included 244 acres (99 ha) of surrounding land to be used as a park (now known as MacLennan Park). After some debate, the state decided to accept the home in 1957. Since 1962 it has been used as the governor's residence.

It was listed in the National Register of Historic Places in 1982.

During the 1990s, the mansion underwent a $4.3 million refurbishment, which was completed in 2000.
