= Wyandotte County Courthouse =

- U.S. National Register of Historic Places
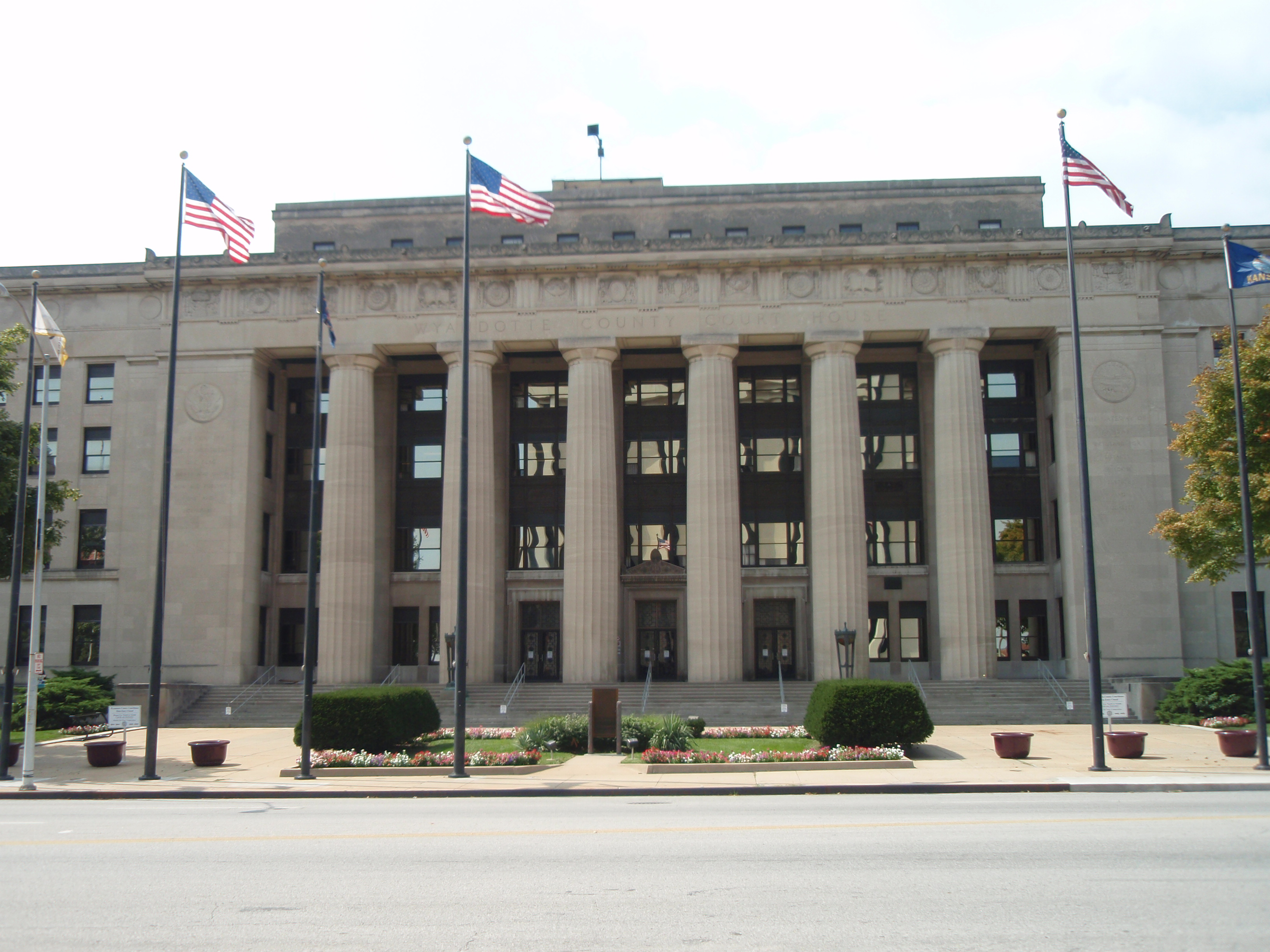

- Location within Kansas Location within the United States
- Interactive map showing the location of Wyandotte County Courthouse
- Location: 710 N. 7th St., Kansas City, Kansas
- Coordinates: 39°06′51″N 94°37′38″W
- Area: less than one acre
- Built by: Swensen, Godfrey
- Architect: Wight and Wight
- Architectural style: Classical Revival
- MPS: County Courthouses of Kansas MPS
- NRHP reference No.: 02000398
- Added to NRHP: April 26, 2002

The Wyandotte County Courthouse, located at 710 N. 7th St. in Kansas City, Kansas, is a courthouse which was listed on the National Register of Historic Places in 2002.

It was designed in Classical Revival style by architects Wight and Wight, and was built by contractor Godfrey Swensen.
