= South Liberty Courthouse Square Historic District =

Historic district in Missouri, United States

- U.S. National Register of Historic Places
- U.S. Historic district
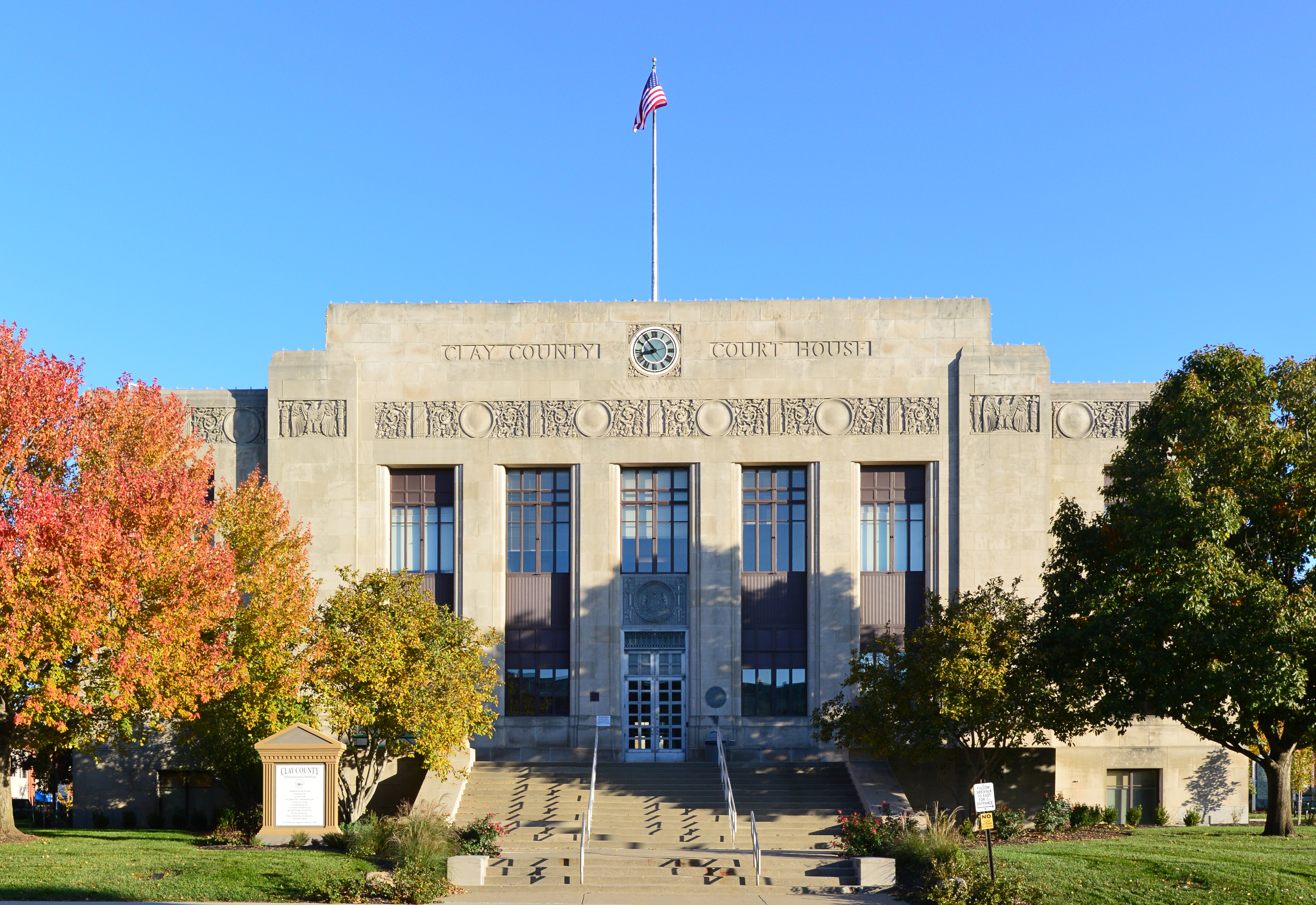
- Clay County Courthouse, July 2006

- Location within Missouri Location within the United States
- Location: 2 S. Main St., 10 E. Kansas St., 1-17 E. Kansas St., Liberty, Missouri
- Coordinates: 39°14′45″N 94°25′11″W
- Area: less than one acre
- Built: 1875
- Architect: Wight & Wight; Haeussler, A.F.
- Architectural style: Classical Revival, Late Victorian, Modern Movement
- MPS: Liberty MPS
- NRHP reference No.: 92001680
- Added to NRHP: December 28, 1992

South Liberty Courthouse Square Historic District is a national historic district located at Liberty, Clay County, Missouri. It encompasses nine contributing buildings in the central business district of Liberty. The district developed between about 1875 and 1942, and includes representative examples of Classical Revival, Late Victorian, and Modern Movement style architecture. Notable buildings include the Clay County Courthouse (1935–1936) by Wight and Wight and First National Bank (1923).

It was listed on the National Register of Historic Places in 1992.
