= Felician Sisters =

Roman Catholic order founded in 1855

Congregation of Sisters of St. Felix of Cantalice
- Congregatio Sororum S. Felicis A Cantalicio
- Abbreviation: CSSF
- Formation: 1855
- Type: religious congregation
- Headquarters: Via Aurelia, 472, 00165; Rome, Italy
- Members: 1500 (2016)
- Affiliations: Roman Catholic Church

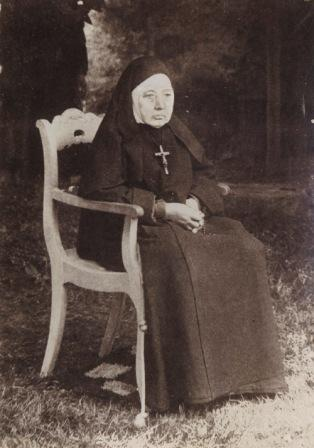
Blessed Mary Angela, foundress of the Felician sisters

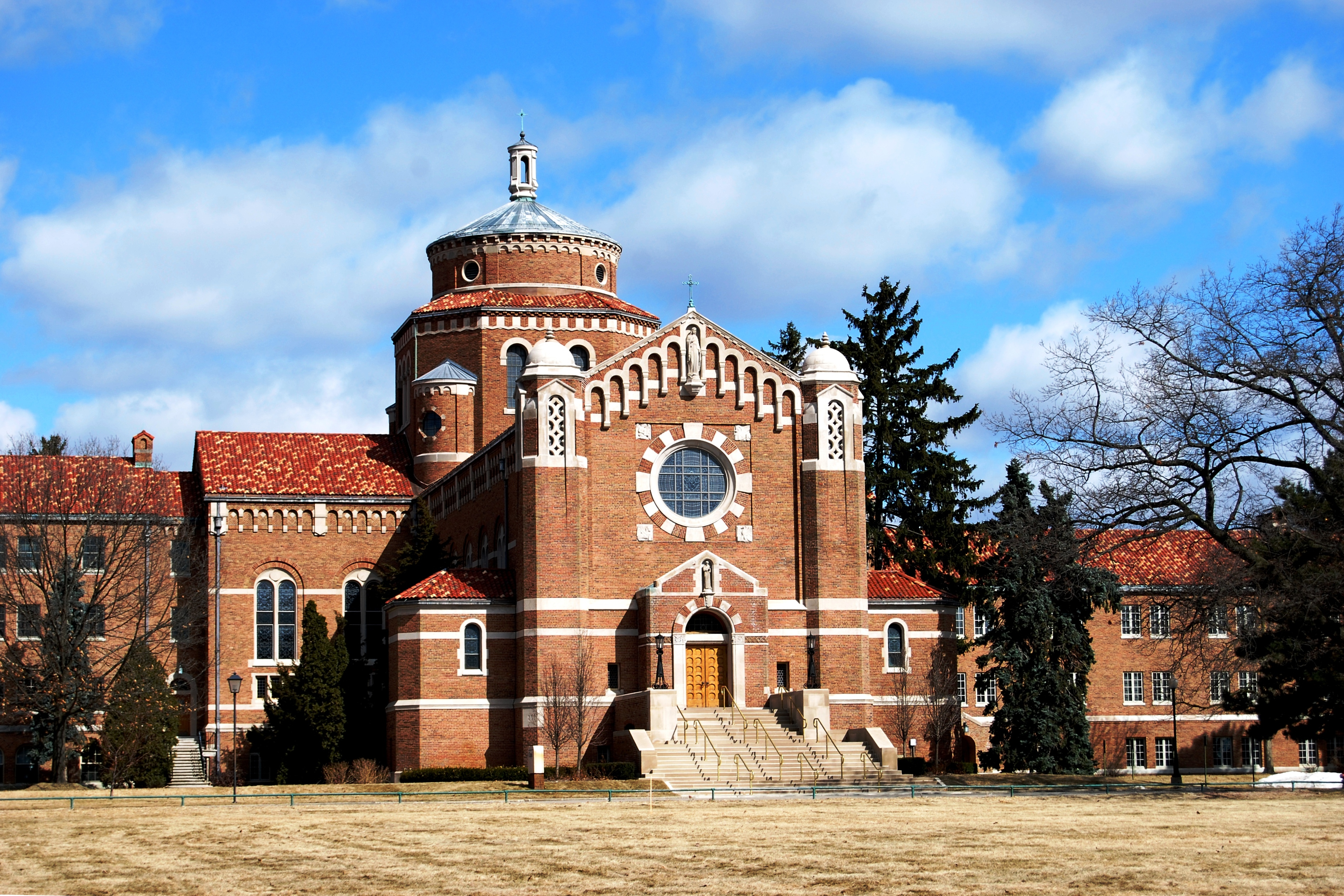
Chapel (1936) of the Felician sisters in Livonia, Michigan

The Felician Sisters, in full Congregation of Sisters of St. Felix of Cantalice Third Order Regular of St. Francis of Assisi (abbreviated CSSF), is a religious institute of pontifical right whose members profess public vows of and live in common. This religious institute was founded in Warsaw, Poland, in 1855, by Angela Truszkowska, and named for a shrine of Saint Felix of Cantalice, a 16th-century Capuchin especially devoted to children.

== History ==
=== Foundation ===
On the Feast of the Presentation of the Blessed Virgin Mary, November 21, 1855, while praying before an icon of Our Lady of Czestochowa, Angela Truszkowska and her cousins dedicated themselves to do the will of Jesus Christ in all things. Hereafter this was recorded as the official founding day of the Congregation of the Sisters of St. Felix of Cantalice.

People began calling them "Sisters of St. Felix", in reference to the shrine of St. Felix of Cantalice at a nearby Capuchin church. They were popularly referred to as Felician sisters. In 1857, she and several associates took the Franciscan habit. In 1869 health problems caused her to withdraw from administration of the Congregation. She spent the next thirty years on assignments in the garden and greenhouse, tending flowers for the chapel and in the liturgical vestment sewing room, embroidering altar cloths and chasubles. She died at the provincial house in Kraków on October 10, 1899. Mother Mary Angela Truszkowska was beatified by Pope John Paul II in 1993.

=== Expansion ===
The Felician sisters came to the United States in 1874, at the invitation of Rev. Joseph Dabrowski, pastor of St. Joseph Parish in Polonia, Wisconsin. There they taught in the parish school. Eventually some relocated to Detroit, MI, where they taught school starting in 1880 at St. Albertus's school. By 1900, they were responsible for the teaching of two-thirds of all Polish Catholic children in Poletown as they staffed St. Albertus, St. Casimir, St. Josaphat, and St. Stanislav.

In 1947 Felician Sisters of Our Lady of the Angels Province, Enfield, Connecticut, accepted an offer to purchase the Paine Private Hospital located in Bangor, Maine; the name of the facility was changed to St. Joseph Hospital. Eventually, their work spread to Canada and Haiti.

== Religious habit ==
Most Felician sisters maintain the religious habit of their foundress, Blessed Mary Angela Truszkowska, consisting of a brown tunic (beige during summer months), scapular, headdress, black veil, collar, Felician wooden crucifix suspended on tape or cord, and simple ring received at the perpetual vows. This remains a discipline in the Kraków, Przemyśl and Warsaw provinces in Poland. At the 1994 General Chapter, a proposal passed allowing the sisters to wear an alternate habit consisting of a brown, black, beige or white skirt, blazer, suit or jumper along with a white blouse. Sisters wearing the alternate habit wear the Felician Crucifix along with the ring received at final profession and may wear it with or without a veil.

== Ministry ==
The Felician Sisters have always sought to harmonize a deep spiritual and community life with dedication to diverse acts of mercy. As of 2014, there were 1,800 professed members of the Felician Sisters, with about 700 in the North American Province.

They remain active in education, operating, among other facilities, the St. Mary Child Care Center in Livonia, Michigan; Immaculate Conception High School, founded in 1915 in Lodi, New Jersey; and Villa Maria College in Buffalo, New York. Madonna University in Livonia, Michigan was originally founded as the "Presentation of the Blessed Virgin Mary Junior College" in 1937.

Built on the site of a former Felician orphanage, Our Lady of Grace Village in Newark, Delaware is a 60-unit affordable housing community. The St. Felix Centre in Toronto, Canada offers Respite services. In Holly, Michigan, they run the Maryville Retreat Center.

=== Volunteers in Mission Program ===
As part of the Catholic Volunteer Network, the North American Province has a Felician Volunteers in Mission (VIM) program which offers both short and long-term service opportunities to lay men and women interested in partnering with the Felician Sisters to serve, with compassion, mercy and joy, the disadvantaged and underserved.

== Provinces ==
- Immaculate Heart of Mary, Kraków, Poland (1861)
- Our Lady of Czestochowa, Przemyśl, Poland (1910)
- Our Lady Queen of Poland, Warsaw, Poland (1922)
- Nossa Senhora Aparecida, Curitiba, Paraná, Brazil (1950)
- Our Lady Mediatrix of Graces, Rome, Italy (1953) (Generalate)

In North America, the Felician Sisters have ministered primarily to Polish Americans since their arrival from Poland in 1874. The sisters provided social mobility for young Polish women. Although the congregation was involved in the care of orphans, the aged, and the sick, teaching remained its primary concern.

- Our Lady of Hope, North America (2009), an amalgamation of the following eight provinces:
  - Presentation of the Blessed Virgin Mary, Livonia, Michigan (1874)
  - Immaculate Heart of Mary, Buffalo, New York (1900)
  - Mother of Good Counsel, Chicago, Illinois (1910)
  - Immaculate Conception, Lodi, New Jersey (1913)
  - Our Lady of the Sacred Heart, Coraopolis, Pennsylvania (1920)
  - Our Lady of the Angels, Enfield, Connecticut (1932)
  - Assumption of the Blessed Virgin Mary, Rio Rancho, New Mexico (1953)
  - Holy Name of Mary Mississauga, Ontario Canada (1964)

== See also ==
- Josaphata Hordashevska student of the Felicians who went on to become a religious founder, teacher, and missionary
- Holy Name of Mary Catholic Secondary School
- Holy Name of Mary College School
- St. Florian Church (Hamtramck, Michigan)
- St. Adalbert Parish, South Bend, Indiana
- Our Lady of Mount Carmel Parish (Wyandotte, Michigan)
