= Waverly Hills, Louisville =

Neighborhood in Louisville, Kentucky

Waverly Hills is a neighborhood in Southwestern Louisville, Kentucky which is centered at Dixie Highway (US 31W) and Pages Lane. It is located in a hilly section of the city, which is part of the larger Knobs Region which extends into southeastern Kentucky. Its boundaries are roughly Stonestreet Road and 3rd Street Road to the south, Dixie Highway to the west, St Andrews Church Road to the north, and Auburndale to the east.

Until the 1990s, the area remained largely rural and heavily forested, but has since been developed with many upscale subdivisions, and is now the most affluent area of Louisville's South End, with a median family income of over $101,499 and over 30% of inhabitants having a bachelor's degree or higher. Development has been most intense along Arnoldtown Road.

It is named after the site of the former Waverly Hills Sanatorium. The area is also home to Waverly Park, which includes the 9-hole Bobby Nichols Golf Course.

== Geography ==
Waverly Hills, Louisville is located at 38°7′25″N 85°51′7″W.
