= Waverly Hills Sanatorium =

U.S. NRHP hospital

Coordinates: 38°07′48.53″N 85°50′30.22″W

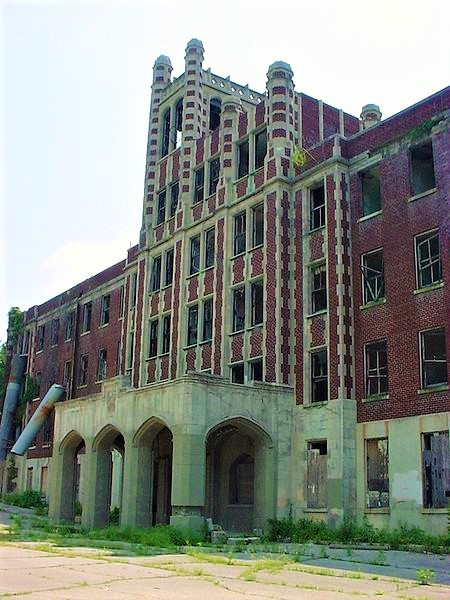
- Main entrance

Geography
- Location: Kentucky, United States

Organization
- Type: Specialist

Services
- Specialty: Tuberculosis sanatorium

History
- Constructed: 1910 (phase 1); 1924 (phase 2)
- Opened: 1910 (original); 2001 (renovated)
- Closed: 1961

Links
- Lists: Hospitals in Kentucky
- Waverly Hills Tuberculosis Sanatorium Historic Buildings
- U.S. National Register of Historic Places
- Location: 4400 Paralee Dr., Louisville, Kentucky
- Architects: James J. Gaffney, Dennis Xavier Murphy
- MPS: Jefferson County MRA
- NRHP reference No.: 83002746
- Added to NRHP: July 12, 1983

The Waverly Hills Sanatorium is a former sanatorium located in the Waverly Hills neighborhood of Louisville, Kentucky. In the early 1900s, Jefferson County was ravaged by an outbreak of tuberculosis – known as the "White Plague" – which prompted the construction of a new hospital.

The sanatorium opened in 1910 as a two-story facility able to accommodate between 40 and 50 tuberculosis patients. As the number of tuberculosis patients increased, a larger five-story facility was constructed and opened in 1926.

The hospital closed in 1961, due to the success of antibiotic drug streptomycin in lowering the needs for such a facility. At some point, plans were made to turn the abandoned hospital into a hotel, but this is no longer the case.

Currently, tours of the ex-hospital are conducted within the building. It is marketed as a haunted hospital.

== History ==
The land that is known today as "Waverly Hill" was purchased by Major Thomas H. Hays in 1883 as the Hays family home. Since the new home was far away from any existing schools, Mr. Hays decided to open a local school for his daughters to attend.

He started a one-room schoolhouse on Pages Lane and hired Lizzie Lee Harris as the teacher. Due to Miss Harris' fondness for Walter Scott's Waverley novels, she named the schoolhouse Waverley School. Major Hays liked the peaceful-sounding name, so he named his property Waverley Hill.

The Board of Tuberculosis Hospital kept the name when they bought the land and opened the sanatorium. It is not known exactly when the spelling changed to exclude the second "e" and became Waverly Hills. However, the spelling fluctuated between both spellings many times over the years.

=== Original sanatorium ===
In the early 20th century, Louisville had one of the highest tuberculosis death rates in the United States, with the city's location in the Ohio Valley and limited airflow considering attributing factors. In an effort to contain the disease, a two-story wooden sanatorium was constructed with and administrative building and two open-air pavilions, each housing 20 patients.

Artificial pneumothorax, a procedure in which the lung is deliberately collapsed, allowing it to rest, was among one of the many treatments among patients at Waverly Hills.

On August 31, 1912, all tuberculosis patients from the City Hospital were relocated to temporary quarters in tents on the grounds of Waverly Hills pending the completion of a hospital for advanced cases. In December 1912, a hospital for advanced cases opened for the treatment of another 40 patients.

In 1914, a children's pavilion added another 50 beds making the known "capacity" around 130 patients. The children's pavilion was not only for sick children but also for the children of tuberculosis patients who could not be cared for properly otherwise. This report also mentions that the goal was to add a new building each year to continually grow so there may have even been more beds available than specifically listed.

=== Building of a durable facility and later closing of the sanatorium ===
The Sanatorium's design reflected contemporary tuberculosis treatment practices that emphasized fresh air and a rural environment. Its extensive porches allowed patients to spend time outdoors during their treatments.

Due to constant need for repairs on the wooden structures, need for a more durable structure, as well as need for more beds so that people would not be turned away due to lack of space, construction of a five-story building that could hold more than 400 patients began in March 1924. The new building opened on October 17, 1926.

In the summer of 1926, Esther Maxwell Barrens became the first Black nurse hired at Waverly Hills. Waverly Hills operated segregated facilities for black and white patients. Black patients were housed separately from patients in the main sanitorium.

The new facility functioned as a largely self-contained community. Its grounds included laundry and water-treatment facilities, a slaughterhouse, vegetable gardens and a post office. A dormitory was constructed on the grounds to house nurses employed at the sanatorium.

The sanatorium featured a 500-foot tunnel built to carry steam and supplies between the heating plant located at the bottom of the hill and the main sanatorium building. The tunnel was equipped with a cable car used to transport items up and down the passageway. According to a number of stories and anecdotes, during a limited time between the 1920s and 1940s the tunnel also served to discreetly transport corpses to a waiting ambulance at the bottom of the hill, sparing patients the knowledge that someone had died.

After effective treatments for tuberculosis became available the number of tuberculosis cases gradually declined. The remaining patients were sent to Hazelwood Sanatorium in Louisville. Waverly Hills closed in June 1961.

=== Woodhaven Medical Services ===
The building reopened in 1962 as the Woodhaven Geriatric Center, a nursing home that cared for older patients, including people with dementia and mobility limitations, as well as patients with mental disabilities. The facility experienced overcrowding and staffing shortages, and reports of patient neglect contributed to increased scrutiny. Woodhaven closed in 1980.

=== Prison ===
Simpsonville developer J. Clifford Todd bought the hospital in 1983 for $3,005,000. He and architect Milton Thompson wanted to convert it into a minimum-security prison for the state, but the developers dropped the plan after neighbors protested. Todd and Thompson then proposed converting the hospital into apartments, but they counted on Jefferson Fiscal Court to buy around 140 acres (57 ha) from them for $400,000, giving them the money to start the project.

=== Statue ===
In March 1996, Robert Alberhasky bought Waverly Hills and the surrounding area. Alberhasky's Christ the Redeemer Foundation Inc. made plans to construct the world's tallest statue of Jesus on the site, along with an arts and worship center. The statue, which was inspired by the famed Christ the Redeemer statue on Corcovado Mountain in Rio de Janeiro, would have been designed by local sculptor Ed Hamilton and architect Jasper Ward.

The first phase of the development, coming in at a cost of $4 million, would have been a statue of 150 feet (46 m) tall and 150 feet (46 m) wide, situated on the roof of the sanatorium. The second phase would convert the old sanatorium into a chapel, theater, and a gift shop at a cost of $8 million or more.

The plan to construct this religious icon fell through because donations to the project fell well short of expectations. In a period of a year, only $3,000 was raised towards the project despite efforts to pool money from across the nation. The project was canceled in December 1997.

=== Restoration ===
After Alberhasky's plans fell through, Waverly Hills was sold to Tina and Charlie Mattingly in 2001. The Mattinglys began offering tours of Waverly Hills and hosting an annual Halloween haunted house attraction, with proceeds used toward restoration of the property. Restoration work has included repairs to the building's windows and interior.

=== Sounds of the Underground Music Festival ===
Waverly Hills Sanatorium hosted the last show of the touring music festival Sounds of the Underground on August 11, 2007. The show featured prominent acts in the extreme metal and metalcore scene, including Job for a Cowboy, The Acacia Strain Hatebreed, Shadows Fall, Chimaira, Gwar, Cameo, Lamb of God, and The Number Twelve Looks Like You.

Similar festivals or concerts will likely not happen again at the Waverly Hills Sanatorium, due to complaints made by local residents.

== In popular culture ==
- On February 28, 2006, the American horror film Death Tunnel was filmed at Waverly Hills Sanatorium.
- On March 29, 2006, Waverly Hills Sanitorium was featured on The Sci Fi Channel Ghost Hunters in the episode "Haunted Sanatorium."
- On October 8, 2010, Waverly Hills Sanatorium was featured on the Travel Channel series Ghost Adventures in the episode "Waverly Hills Sanatorium."
- On April 28, 2017, Waverly Hills Sanatorium was featured in the web-series Buzzfeed Unsolved in the episode "Haunted Halls of Waverly Hills Hospital."
- They later revisited it for the series premiere of Ghost Files, a similar series hosted on their independent Watcher channel.
- In 2021, Waverly Hills Sanitorium was featured on the Travel Channel series Destination Fear.
- The video game Project Zomboid, set in Kentucky, features a fictionalized version of the Waverly Hills Sanatorium, called the "Sunderland Hills Sanatorium".

== See also ==
- List of attractions and events in the Louisville metropolitan area
- List of reportedly haunted locations in the United States
- National Register of Historic Places listings in Jefferson County, Kentucky
