= Kirkwood Building =

- U.S. National Register of Historic Places
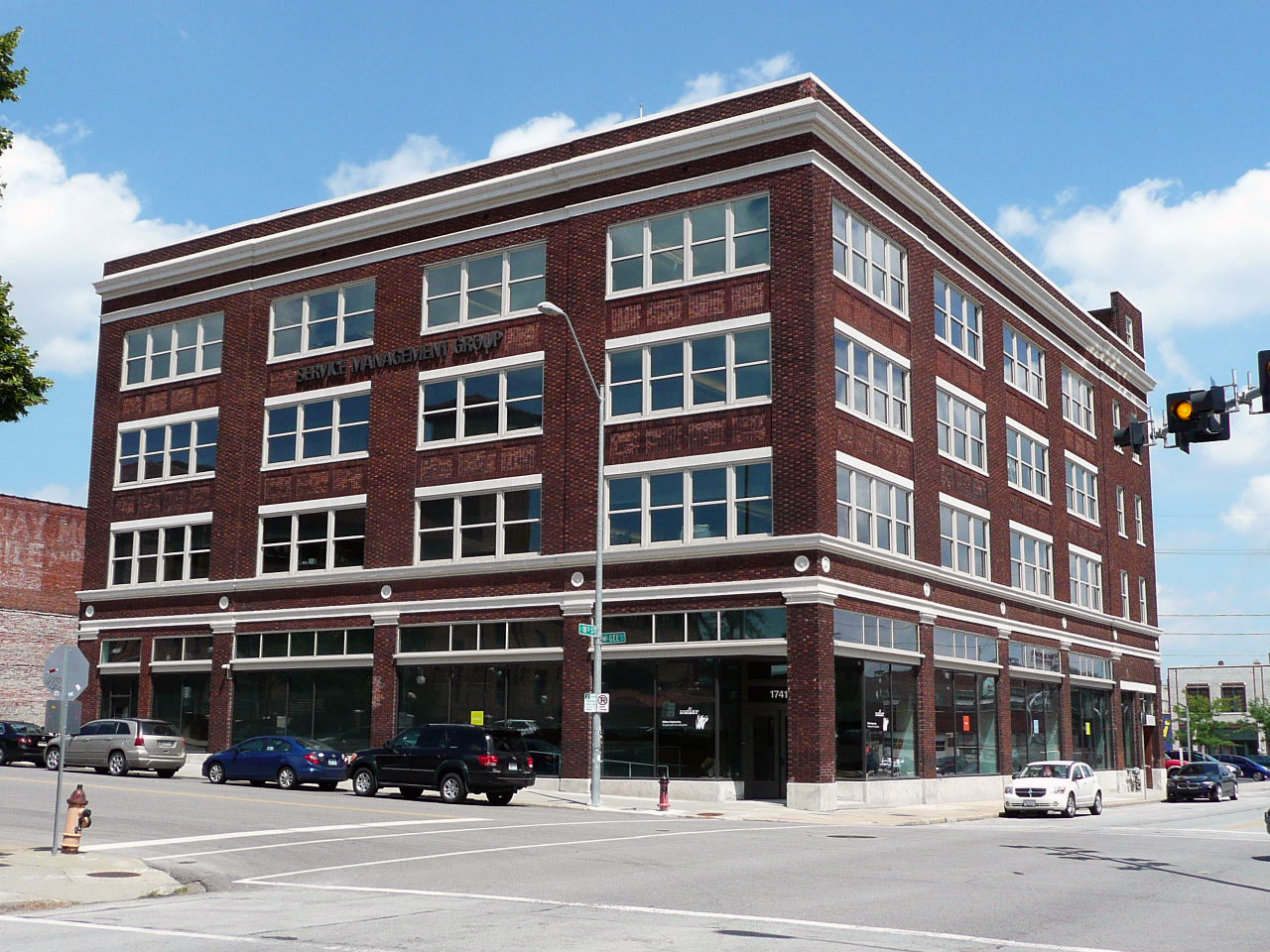
- Kirkwood Building in 2015

- Location within Missouri Location within the United States
- Location: 1737-41 McGee St., Kansas City, Missouri
- Coordinates: 39°5′38″N 94°34′47″W
- Area: less than one acre
- Built: 1920
- Architect: Wight and Wight; Long, R.A. Construction Co.
- Architectural style: Early Commercial
- NRHP reference No.: 01000767
- Added to NRHP: July 25, 2001

The Kirkwood Building in Kansas City, Missouri is a building from 1920. It was listed on the National Register of Historic Places in 2001.

It was designed by architects Wight and Wight in Early Commercial style.
