= Holy Names High School =

Holy Names High School may refer to:

- Holy Names High School (Windsor, Ontario), Canada
- Holy Names High School (Oakland, California), United States

== See also ==
- Academy of the Holy Names (disambiguation)
- Holy Names Academy, Seattle, Washington, United States
- Holy Name High School, Parma Heights, Ohio, United States
