= Repton (Louisville, Kentucky) =

Historic house in Kentucky, United States

- U.S. National Register of Historic Places
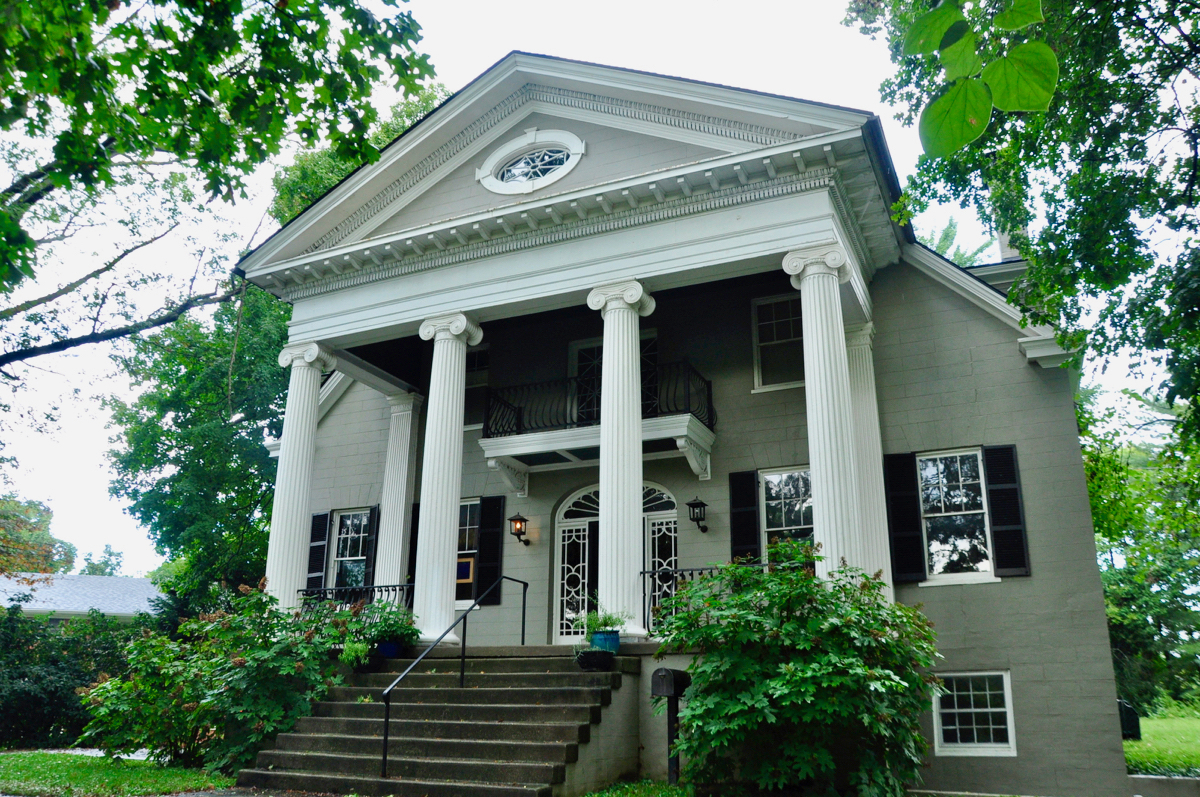

- Location within Kentucky Location within the United States
- Location: 314 Ridgedale Rd., Louisville, Kentucky
- Coordinates: 38°15′38″N 85°41′47″W
- Area: less than one acre
- Built: 1902
- Architect: Gaffney, J. J.
- Architectural style: Classical Revival
- NRHP reference No.: 82002717
- Added to NRHP: May 13, 1982

Repton is a historic house at 314 Ridgedale Road in Louisville, Kentucky that was designed by one of Louisville's leading architect J. J. Gaffney. The current Classical Revival structure was rebuilt in 1902, using the walls and foundation of the original structure which burned in approximately 1895. The original structure was the home of Norbourne Galt. The property was later owned by inventor Thomas W. Moran who built the current 1902 structure. The house was listed on the National Register of Historic Places in 1982.
