= Holy Name of Jesus Catholic Church (Indialantic, Florida) =

Church in Florida, United States

Holy Name of Jesus
- Holy Name of Jesus Catholic Church, Indialantic, Florida
- Holy Name of Jesus
- 28°8′3″N 80°34′53″W
- Country: (United States)
- Denomination: Catholic
- Website: http://www.hnj.org

History
- Founded: 1959

Administration
- Province: Ecclesiastical Province of Miami
- Diocese: Roman Catholic Diocese of Orlando
- Deanery: Eastern

Clergy
- Bishop: The Rt. Rev. Thomas Wenski
- Pastor: Fr. Tony Welle

Holy Name of Jesus Catholic Church is a Roman Catholic parish located in Indialantic, Florida. It is under the jurisdiction of the Diocese of Orlando. Its name is often shortened to "Holy Name" in conversation and "HNJ" in informal writing.

A book, Excellent Catholic Parishes, selected the Holy Name of Jesus (HNJ) as one of the top 100 parishes in the county.

The church is a founding member of the SpaceCoast Interfaith Coalition.

== Ministries ==
- Life Teen
- Hearts Out to Haiti
- Habitat for Humanity. In conjunction with an area Baptist church, they have built twelve houses since 1995.
- Society of St. Vincent de Paul Assistance Center - building containing items for sale for the benefit of the poor

== History ==
Holy Name of Jesus began as a mission parish of the Ascension Catholic Church in Eau Gallie. On Christmas Eve, 1959, the first Mass was celebrated by Father Martin B. Power, founding Pastor of Ascension as well as the mission parish in Canova Beach, across the street from where HNJ now resides. The Christmas Eve Mass was celebrated in an unfinished house in Indian Harbour Beach.

Bishop Joseph P. Hurley, of St. Augustine, affectionately known as "Ten Acres Joe" by his priests, for his farsighted policy of buying 10 acres (4.0 ha) all over Florida for future parish sites, had purchased 10 acres (40,000 m^{2}) in 1965, just south of the Eau Gallie Boulevard. In a letter dated January 1961, the pastor informed the Archbishop that the property was land-locked with no right of way on Highway A1A so an additional 3.7-acre (15,000 m^{2}) adjoining property was purchased in June, 1961, with a 290 feet (88 m) frontage on A1A.

Ground was broken for a provisional church on September 9, 1962. The church had a seating capacity of 480 and included a 2,000 sq ft (190 m^{2}). hall. Archbishop Hurley dedicated the church and hall in March 1963. There were about 250 families in the church then. Land had been purchased for the expansion of the mission, which was to include a school and convent.

Technically, Holy Name remained a mission of Ascension parish until May 1968 when the first pastor of Holy Name was appointed by William Donald Borders, the first bishop of Orlando.

After 1969, the church purchased land with 367 feet (112 m) of frontage on A1A and adjacent to the existing church property. This 4.3-acre (17,000 m^{2}) property purchased in 1970 included the Greystone Apartments, which were converted to a rectory while the garage was converted into parish offices. Holy Name of Jesus then had approximately 18 acres (7.3 ha) of beachside property.

The provisional church built in 1963 became overcrowded so the church raised a million dollars in 1978 to build a permanent church with a seating capacity of approximately 850 people. The first Mass was celebrated in the new church on April 25, 1980. Bishop Thomas Grady, dedicated the church on October 26, 1980.

In November, 1986, the first pastor was appointed pastor to the English speaking community of Our Savior Church in The Hague, Holland.

The parish became computerized in 1988. The convent was converted into the Administration Center in 1988 for office space for the pastoral and lay staff. During 1987–88 a nationally known consultant on church process facilitated a parish wide consensus process called Vision 2000 in which parishioners decided on priorities, both in regard to ministry and facilities. This in turn, in 1989, led to the restructuring of the parish ministries into seven commissions which implemented the goals of the then newly formed Pastoral council.

Also as a result of Vision 2000, a successful capital fund drive was conducted in the fall of ’88 to build an Education Center, a Parish Activity Center, a church organ, improved parking, drainage and traffic control, as well as sewer for the entire parish plant.

By 1989 the parish membership had doubled from 1100 to 2200 registered families with an estimated 500 to 800 additional families not registered. Continuing into the 90’s new ministries were developed and new buildings were constructed.

The HNJ School Board’s five-year plan, which included five new classrooms, was completed in time for the 1998–99 school year. The classroom building was constructed so that the rooms could be used by parish groups for evening meetings.

A new rectory for the priests was completed in 1995. This freed up space in the old rectory for the expansion of the St. Vincent de Paul Society Assistance Center, renovation of the Outreach Thrift Store and the only one of its kind, a Christian Marriage and Family Counseling Center, staffed by professional counselors with appropriate credential and licensed by the State of Florida.

Continued growth again presented the need for a larger worship space. On August 30–31, 1997, after fund raising and parish-style town meetings plans for a new church were underway. The pastor described HNJ’s move to the parish hall for weekend Masses during renovation and expansion of the church as "Back to our Roots."

Construction was completed of the renovated and expanded worship space, chapels and covered gathering space. The first Mass was celebrated August 23, 1998. Bishop Norbert Dorsey dedicated the church October 1998.

Hurricane Jeanne destroyed the Parish Hall and damaged other structures in 2004. A subsequent $12 million fundraiser was successful and construction of a new hall and gym for the school was completed in 2008.

== Staff ==
The parish has three priests, five permanent deacons, and six paid staff members, in addition to the school teaching staff.

=== Pastors ===
1. Monsignor Martin B. Power 1968–1969
2. Father Arthur Dunnigan 1969–1974
3. Father Patrick Quinn 1974–1976
4. Father Peter Henry 1976–1986
5. Monsignor David P. Page 1987–2010
6. Father Anthony Welle 2010–2017
7. Father Scott Circe 2017–present
