= Santissimo Nome di Maria =

Santissimo Nome di Maria may refer to two different churches in Rome:

- Santissimo Nome di Maria al Foro Traiano Church
- Santissimo Nome di Maria in Via Latina

See also:

- Santissimo Nome di Gesù e Maria in Via Lata, a church in Rome
