= James J. Gaffney =

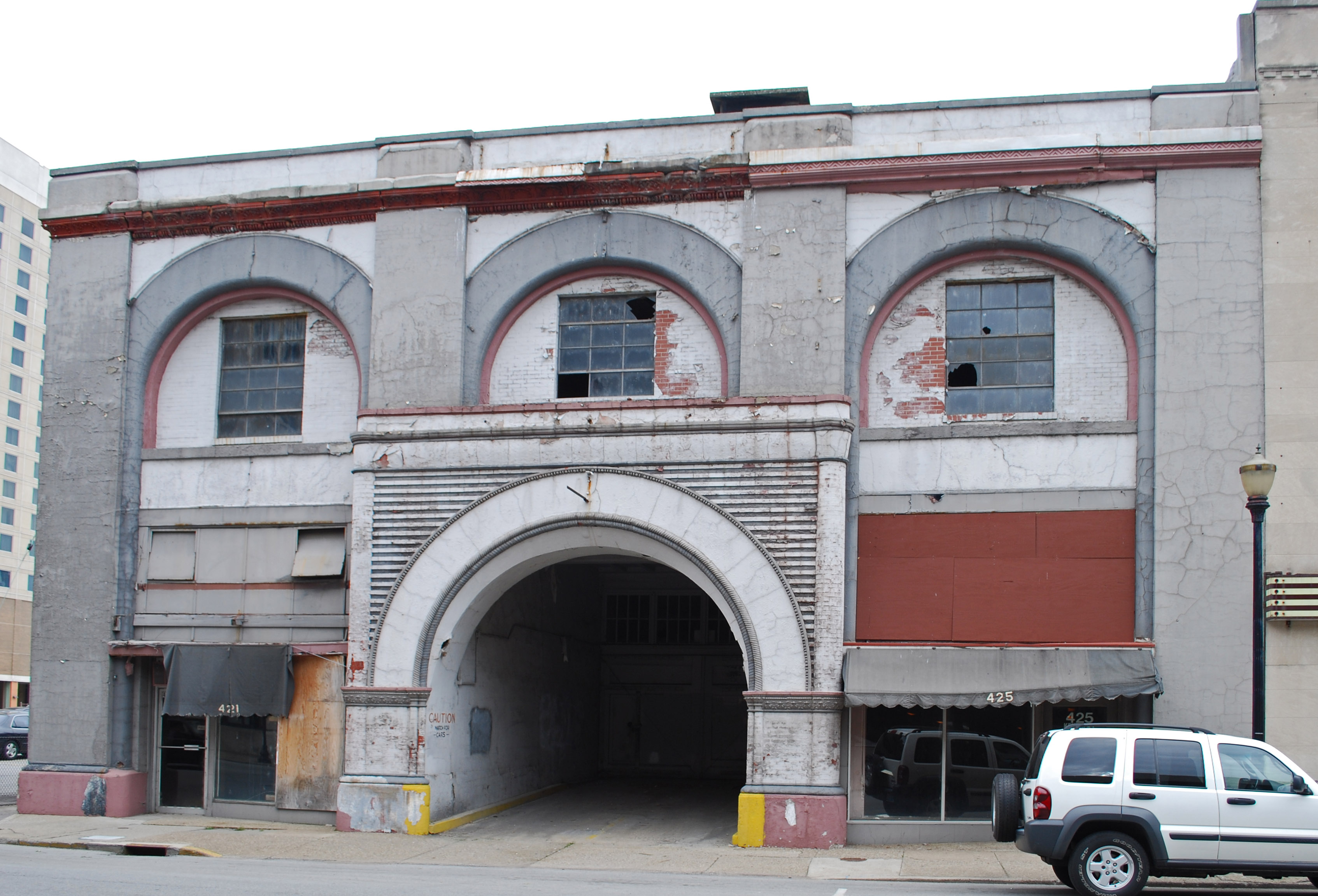
Bosler Fireproof Garage

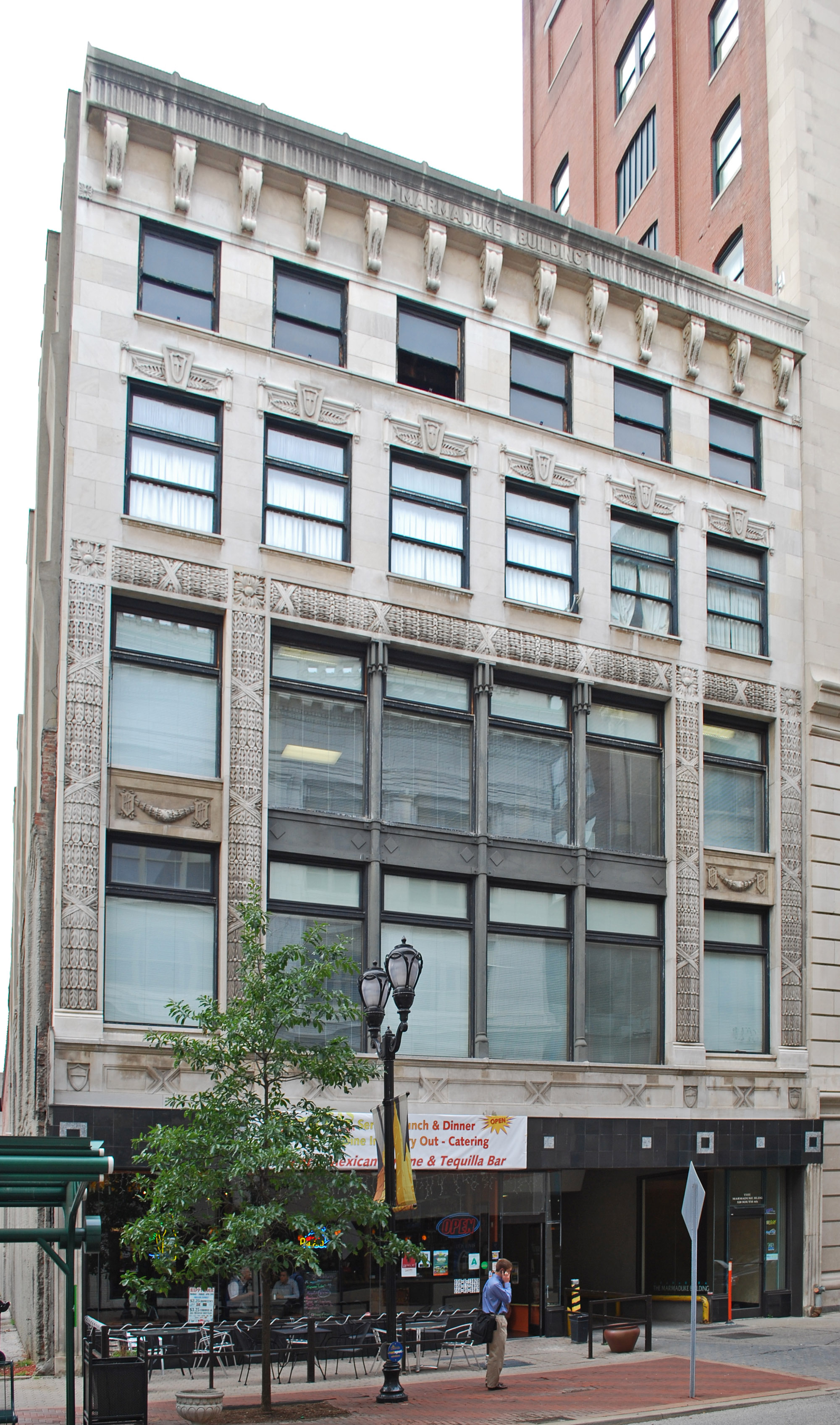
Marmaduke Building

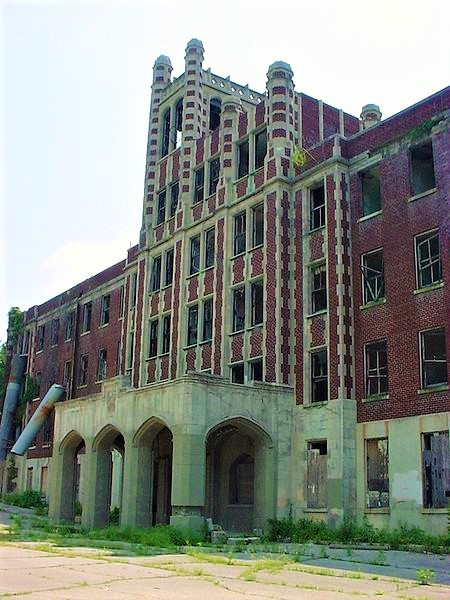
Waverly Hills Sanatorium

James J. Gaffney (June 18, 1863 – November 30, 1946), most often known as J. J. Gaffney, was an American architect in Louisville, Kentucky.

A number of his works are listed on the National Register of Historic Places.

== Personal life ==
Gaffney is buried at St. Louis Cemetery in Louisville.

== Works ==
- Adath Jeshurun Temple and School, 749-757 S. Brook St., Louisville, Kentucky, NRHP-listed
- Bosler Fireproof Garage (later called the Morrissey Garage), 423 S. 3rd St., Louisville, Kentucky, NRHP-listed
- Gaffney House (1910–1927), River Road between Longview Lane and Boxhill Lane, Louisville, Kentucky, NRHP-listed
- Highlands Historic District, Louisville, Kentucky. Gaffney is credited with several homes in the district, including those located at 703 Rubel Avenue (built 1899), 1411 Highland Avenue (built 1898), 2017-19 Murray Avenue (built 1907), and probable attribution to the homes at 1222 and 1224 East Broadway (built 1901).
- Marmaduke Building, 520 S. Fourth Ave., Louisville, Kentucky, NRHP-listed
- Repton, 314 Ridgedale Rd., Louisville, Kentucky, NRHP-listed
- St. James Roman Catholic Church, Rectory, and School, 1430 Bardstown Rd., 1826 and 1818 Edenside Ave., Louisville, Kentucky, NRHP-listed
- Taggart House, 5000 Bardstown Rd., Buechel, Kentucky, NRHP-listed
- Thierman Apartments, 416-420 W. Breckinridge St., Louisville, Kentucky, NRHP-listed
- Waverly Hills Tuberculosis Sanitarium, later known as Waverly Hills Geriatrics Center, 8101 Dixie Hwy., Louisville, Kentucky, NRHP-listed
