= Holy Name of Jesus Catholic Church (Kingston, Ontario) =

Coordinates: 44°17′54″N 76°25′28″W

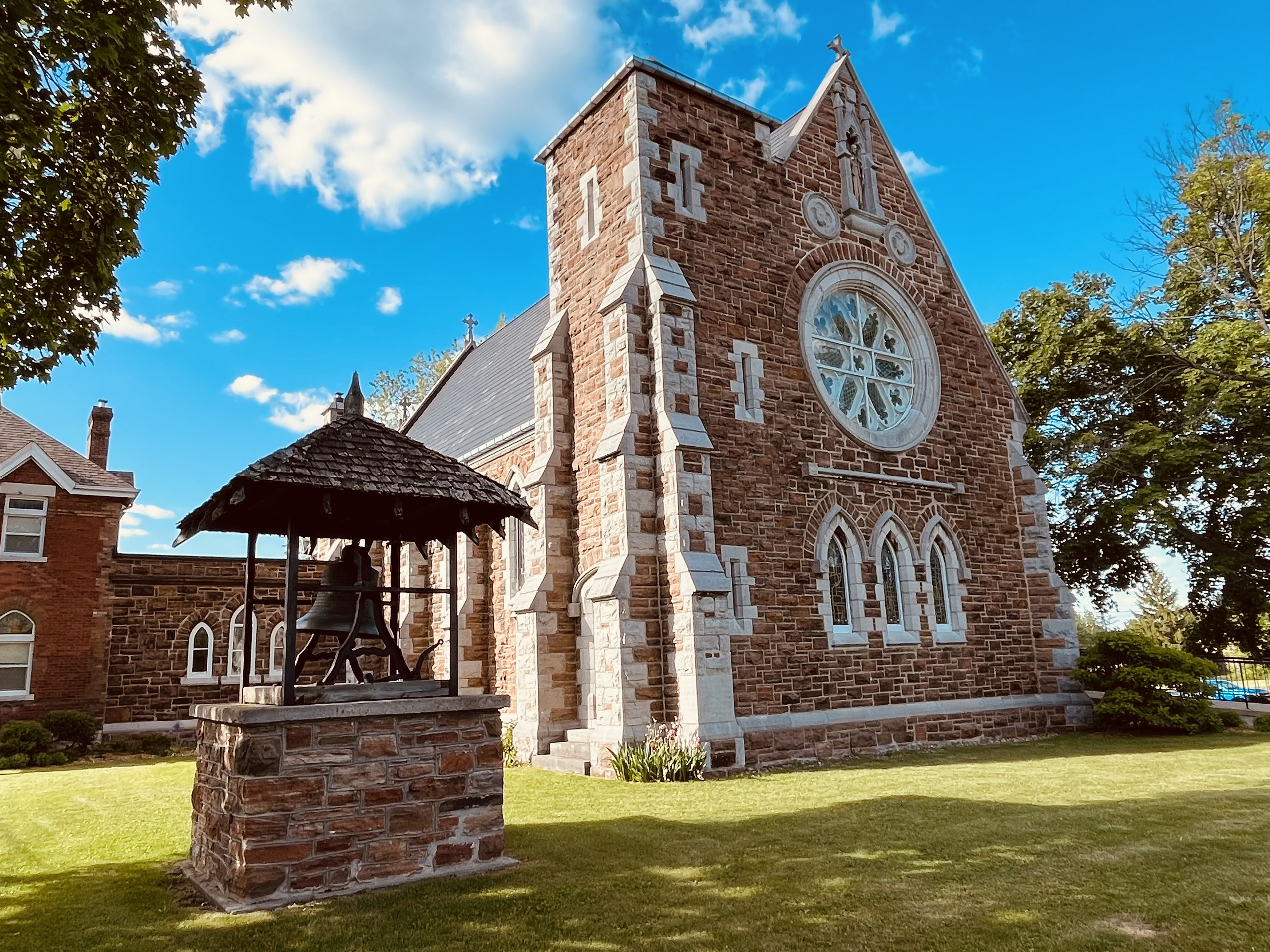
- Side view of the church building
- Holy Name of Jesus Catholic Church
- Location: Kingston, Ontario, Canada
- Denomination: Roman Catholic
- Website: www.holyname.ca

History
- Dedication: 1888

Architecture
- Architect: Joseph Connolly
- Architectural type: Gothic Revival architecture

Administration
- Archdiocese: Kingston

Holy Name of Jesus Church is a Roman Catholic church in Kingston, Ontario, Canada under the Archdiocese of Kingston.

== History ==
Constructed of logs about a mile north to its present location, the early foundation of the church was at Kingston Mills (also called the Cashendall). During the winter period, residents would walk across the Rideau Canal from the Aragon Road to help in the celebration of the holy mass. On June 26, 1886, Edward and Jane Braden donated a land for the construction of the church building and rectory.

Designed by architect Joseph Connolly, the foundation stone of the building was laid by Bishop J.V. Cleary in June 1887 as well as blessed a donated bell on August 15, 1892. It became a parish in 1896 with the appointment of Reverend J.P Kehoe as the first pastor. Reverend W.T. Kingsley, who succeeded him in 1907, was transferred in 1924, and D.A Casey became the pastor. Casey retired in 1953 due to health ailments, hence Reverend T.J Raby became the pastor in September 1953.

Father Raby brought the Sisters of Saint Martha to teach at Holy Name School in 1957, and built a convent for them between the church and the school building.
