= Academy of the Holy Names (Silver Spring, Maryland) =

Coordinates: 38°59′57″N 77°1′21″W

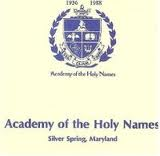
- Silver Spring, Maryland

Information
- Type: Private Girls' Secondary School
- Opened: 1936
- Closed: 1988

The Academy of the Holy Names, or AHN, was a Catholic girls college-preparatory high school located in Silver Spring, Maryland.

== History ==
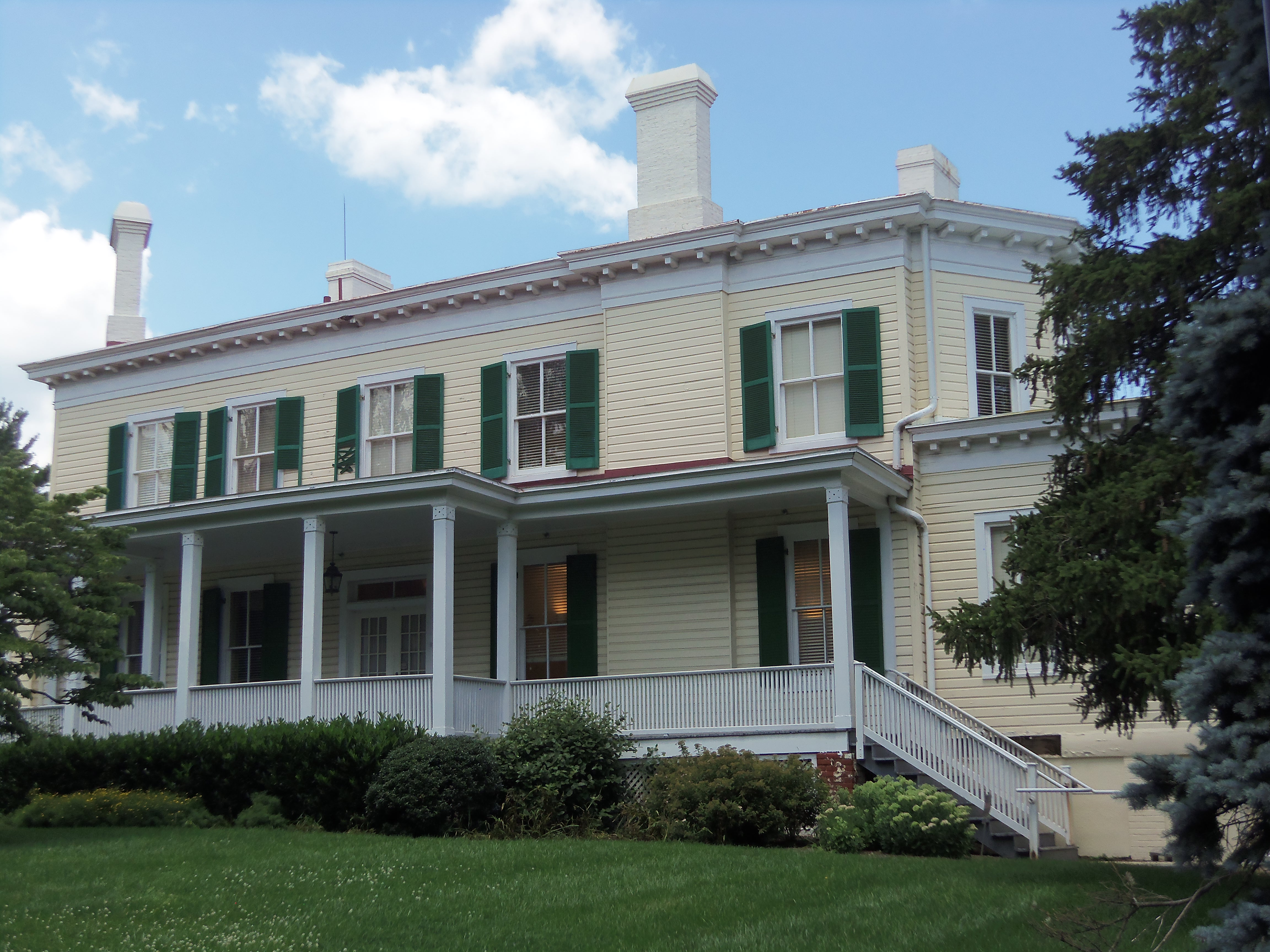
Riggs-Thomson House

Holy Names was built on land that was originally owned by Charles Carroll of Carrollton. England's King Charles granted the land to Carroll. In 1828 Carroll ceded a 147 acres to James and Mary Ann Reynolds who in turn sold it to Thomas and Christina Simpson. Later, the land was acquired by George Washington Riggs, the founder of Riggs Bank of Washington, DC.

On July 27, 1864, Joseph and Octabia Bryan purchased the property and built the first house on the land, which later became the Convent. The house was a white two-story home with a large kitchen, arched doorways, and carved doors. Fireplaces in each room provided heat.

The home also included a ballroom in which, according to legend, Abraham Lincoln danced. Later, the main house served as a "station" on the Underground Railroad.

The Bryans also built a second structure across the street from the school which became a nursing home. Eventually they sold the main house to the Thompsons and the land became known as Thompson's Farm.

In 1923 the Jordan family purchased the land. After the stock market crashed in 1929, Mr. Jordan died. In 1933 the Sisters of the Holy Names purchased the land from Mrs. Jordan for $16,000. The house was used as St. Michael's Elementary School.

The Sisters opened the high school in 1936 and in 1940 celebrated the first graduation of 24 students.

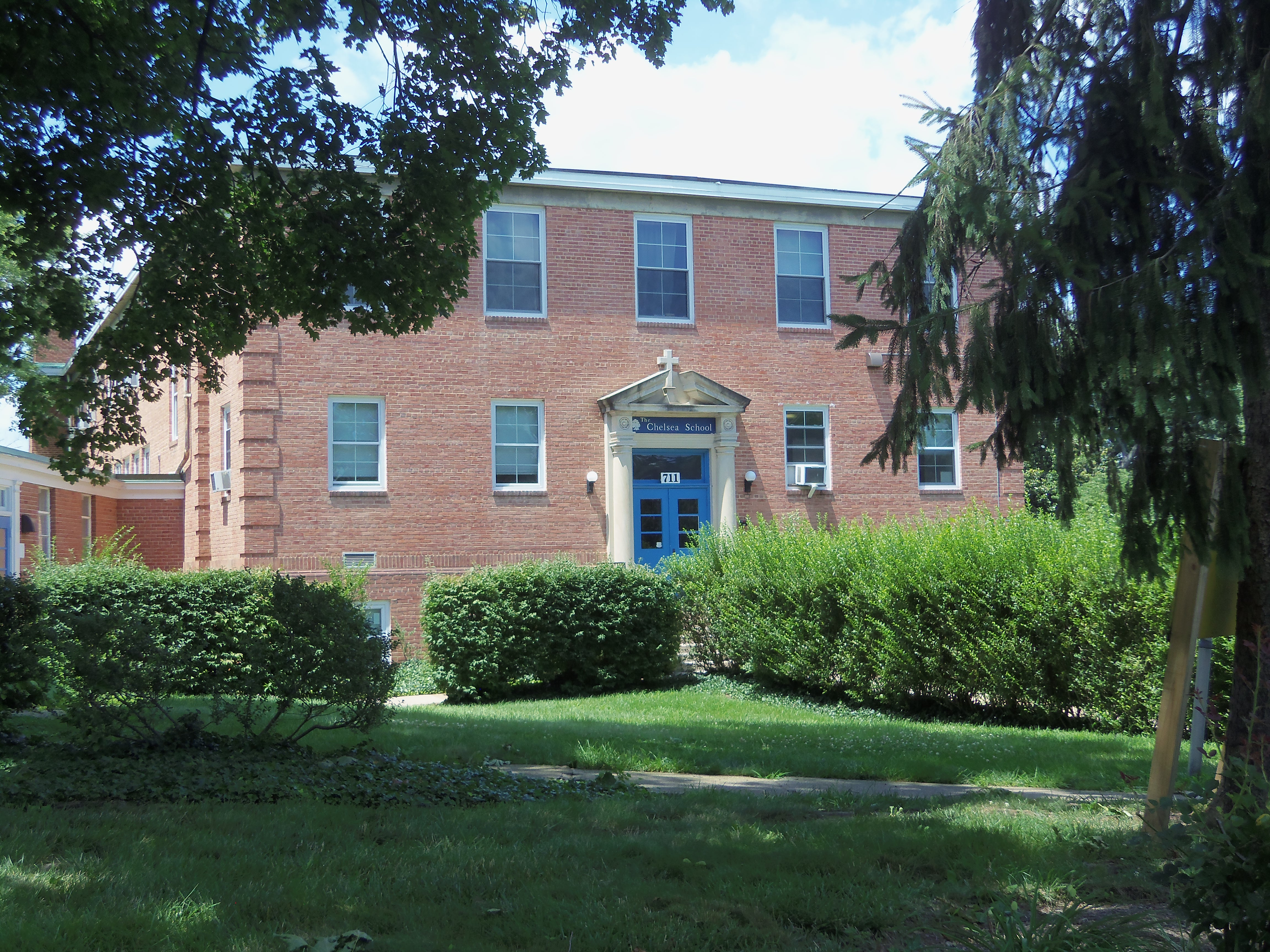
Academy building in 2013

The Sisters expanded the program and built a large two-story brick building in 1951 that served as the main school building although they continued to hold classes in the Convent when space was needed.

As of June 1988 there were 52 graduating classes and a total of 2,700 graduates. The school was founded in 1934 and run by the Sisters of the Holy Names of Jesus and Mary (SNJM).

In 1933, the Sisters of the Holy Names of Jesus and Mary purchased the Riggs-Thompson House and several undeveloped lots along Ellsworth Drive, Pershing Drive and Springvale Road. Originally the school began as an elementary school. High school classes were added in 1936. In 1951 the school added the main two-story brick building, facing Springvale Road.

The school closed due to declining enrollment. The Chelsea School purchased the property in 1988.

== Academics and Activities ==
The high school offered core college preparatory classes including English, Social Studies, Science, Mathematics, Religion, Music, Fine Arts, Business, and Physical Education.

Clubs and sports included Basketball, Field Hockey, soccer, softball, volleyball, Cheerleading, School Newspaper, Yearbook, Archery, Drama, One Act Play Competition and Chorus.

The school motto was "Esse Quam Videri" – To be rather than to seem.

== Enrollment ==
Approximately 2,700 girls graduated from AHN during its 52 years of operation. The school included grades 9–12 with total enrollment size typically between 250 and 350 girls.

According to the Archdiocese of Washington, once the school closed, the school records were archived in Baltimore at the Maryland State Department of Education, Non-Public School Approval Branch.

== Buildings ==
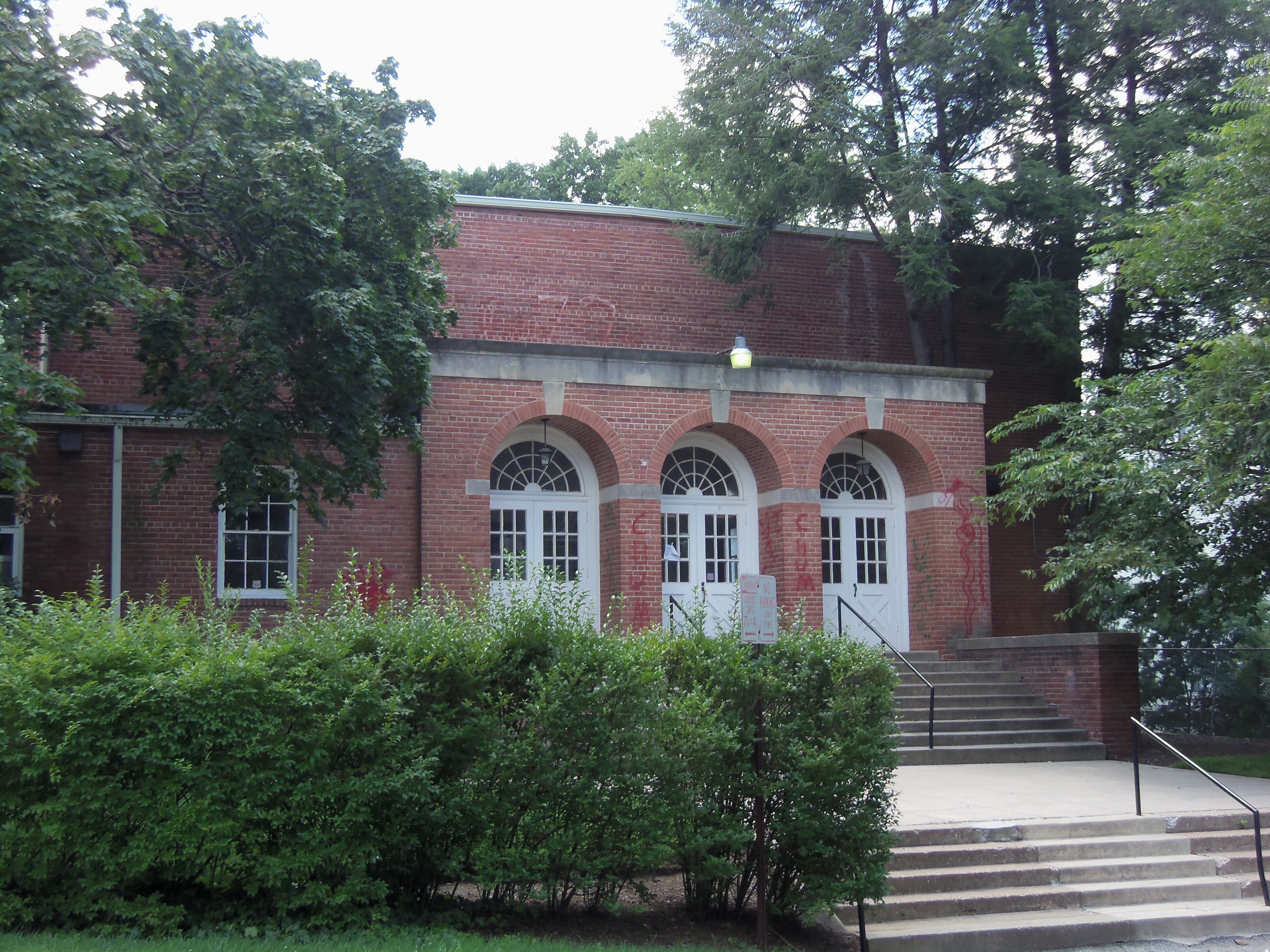
Auditorium entrance

The grounds included a three-level main building with classrooms, gymnasium, cafeteria and offices. A separate building housed the convent with an adjoining walkway connecting the two buildings, referred to as the "ambulatory".

The convent building, located at 711 Pershing Drive, also known as the Riggs-Thomson House, is listed in the Maryland Inventory of Historic Properties (M 36–8).

The school grounds included a garden with a Grotto and a statue of the Blessed Mother, open and wooded walking spaces, an athletic field, and down the sloped hill, a large parking lot.
