= Holy Name of Jesus Church (San Francisco) =

Holy Name of Jesus Church in San Francisco
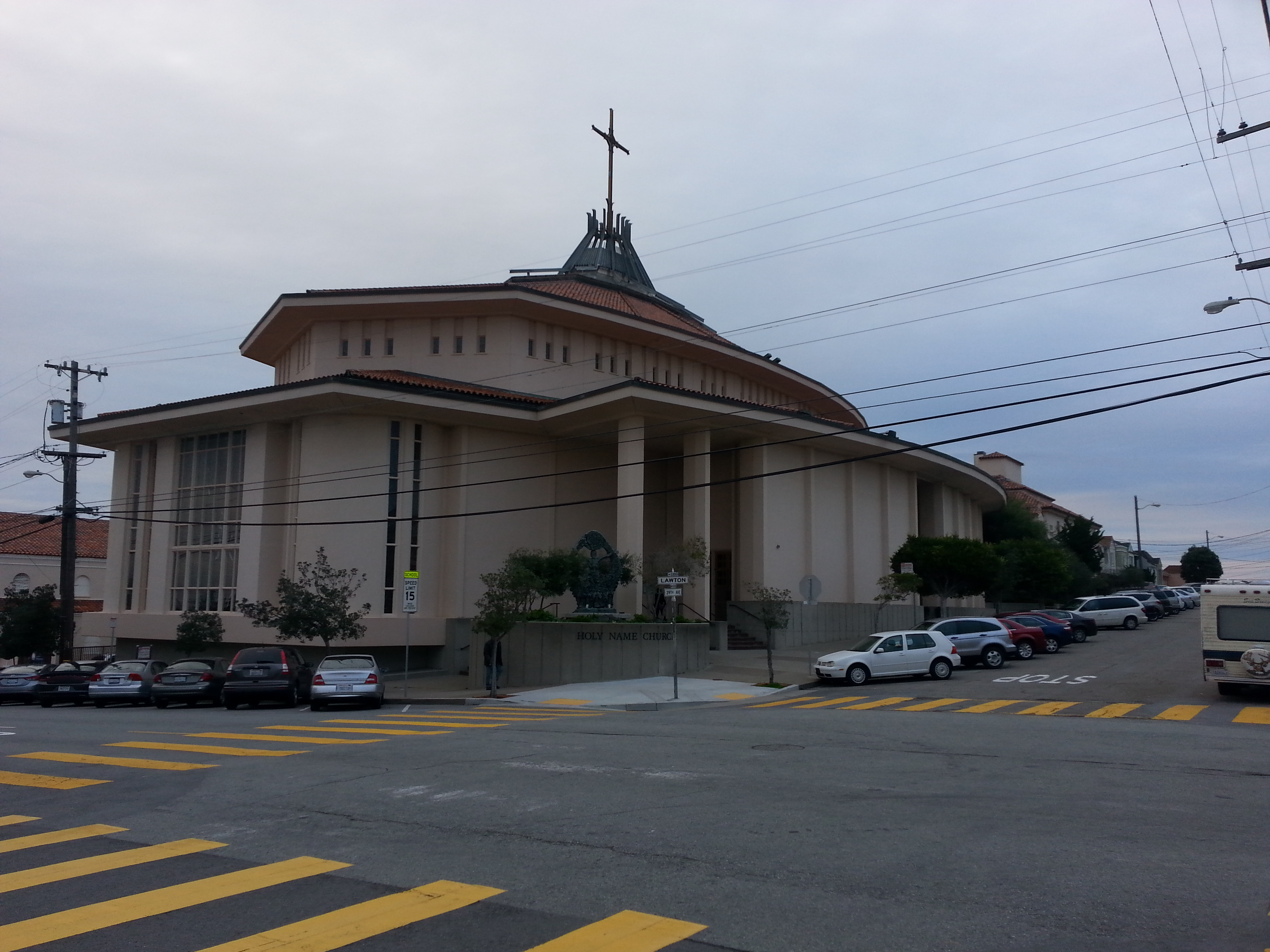
- East side of Holy Name of Jesus Church in San Francisco

- Location within San Francisco County
- 37°45′27″N 122°29′55″W
- Location: Sunset District, San Francisco
- Country: United States

Architecture
- Years built: 1964

Administration
- Diocese: Archdiocese of San Francisco

Holy Name of Jesus Catholic Church in San Francisco is a parish of the Archdiocese of San Francisco in San Francisco, California, United States, one of four Catholic churches in San Francisco's Sunset District, established on October 26, 1925.
