= Holy Name of Mary College School =

Independent school in Ontario, Canada

- Current Updated School Crest

Location
- 2241 Mississauga Road; Mississauga, Ontario, L5H 2K8; Canada; 43.542109°N 79.638063°W

Information
- School type: Independent School
- Motto: Curious, Courageous, Compassionate
- Religious affiliation: Roman Catholic
- Founded: 1964; reverted to Independent school in 2008
- Closed: 2026
- Head of School: Carrie Hughes-Grant
- Grades: 5 to 12
- Enrollment: 230; capped at 500
- Language: English
- Area: Mississauga
- Colours: Blue, Silver
- Mascot: Husky
- Website: holynameofmarycollegeschool.com

Holy Name of Mary College School, located in Mississauga, was Ontario's only independent Catholic school for girls in Grades 5 to 12. The school provided a liberal arts education on a 25-acre campus and has adopted a modified semester system starting in the 2021-2022 academic year. The school offered courses exclusively at the Academic level, except for certain Open courses like Music and Physical Education, and prepared girls to meet university entrance standards. The school placed a significant emphasis on vocal music, as evidenced by its three acclaimed choirs. Holy Name of Mary College School was affiliated with St. Michael's College School, a Catholic all-boys private school located in Toronto.

== History ==
Both Holy Name of Mary College School and Holy Name of Mary Catholic Secondary School trace their origin to the original Holy Name of Mary School founded on 7 September 1964 by the Felician Sisters as a private school for girls. In 1972, the school entered an agreement with the local school board that students in grades 9 and 10 would be publicly funded. In 1987, Holy Name of Mary became a fully funded Catholic secondary school.

The Felician Sisters and St. Michael's College School co-founded the independent Holy Name of Mary College School. In September 2008, Holy Name of Mary reopened as Holy Name of Mary College School, an independent, Catholic all-girls school.

2008 enrollment figures were very low, however the school community rallied and the school remained open. Father Joe Redican, CSB, and President of St. Michael's College School stated, "there has been incredibly strong community support expressed for the vision of an independent Catholic girls’ school, and specifically for the incredible work the current school is doing in educating the wonderful young women who currently attend."

On Sunday, November 1, 2009, Archbishop Cardinal Thomas Christopher Collins presided at the Blessing and Celebration of Holy Name of College School and students. The Holy Name of Mary College School choir and students from St. Michael's College School provided the music at the mass. Guests included Felician Sisters, Trustees, teachers, alumni, and clergy. The ceremony included a Papal Blessing for the school.

== Duke of Edinburgh Award ==
On Saturday, November 27, 2010, 78 participants from across the GTA and Ontario were presented with their Silver Duke of Edinburgh Award by Marc Kielburger, co-founder of Free the Children, at a ceremony held at HNMCS. Jill Hermant, Executive Director of The Duke of Edinburgh's Award said, "We are appreciative of all the support HNMCS is providing the Award on this occasion, over and above the stellar programme they run themselves." As of the 2020–2021 school year, many HNMCS students have pursued the award themselves, with 43 currently partaking in the award.

== Closure ==
On November 12, 2025 students and parents received an email from the Board of directors detailing that Holy Name of Mary College School would be closing as of the 2025-2026 academic year. The email detailed that "despite efforts to attract and retain students, enrolment has dropped by 39% in the past 7 years" and that "enrolment had dropped below the level necessary to sustain operations". The school ended operations on June 30, 2026.

== See also ==
- St. Michael's College School
