= Holy Name of Jesus Cathedral =

Holy Name of Jesus Cathedral may refer to:

- Holy Name of Jesus Cathedral, Fianarantsoa, Madagascar
- Holy Name of Jesus Cathedral, Raleigh, United States

== See also ==
- Holy Name Cathedral (disambiguation)
