= Holy Name Church Rectory, Convent and School =

Historic church in Kentucky, United States

- U.S. National Register of Historic Places
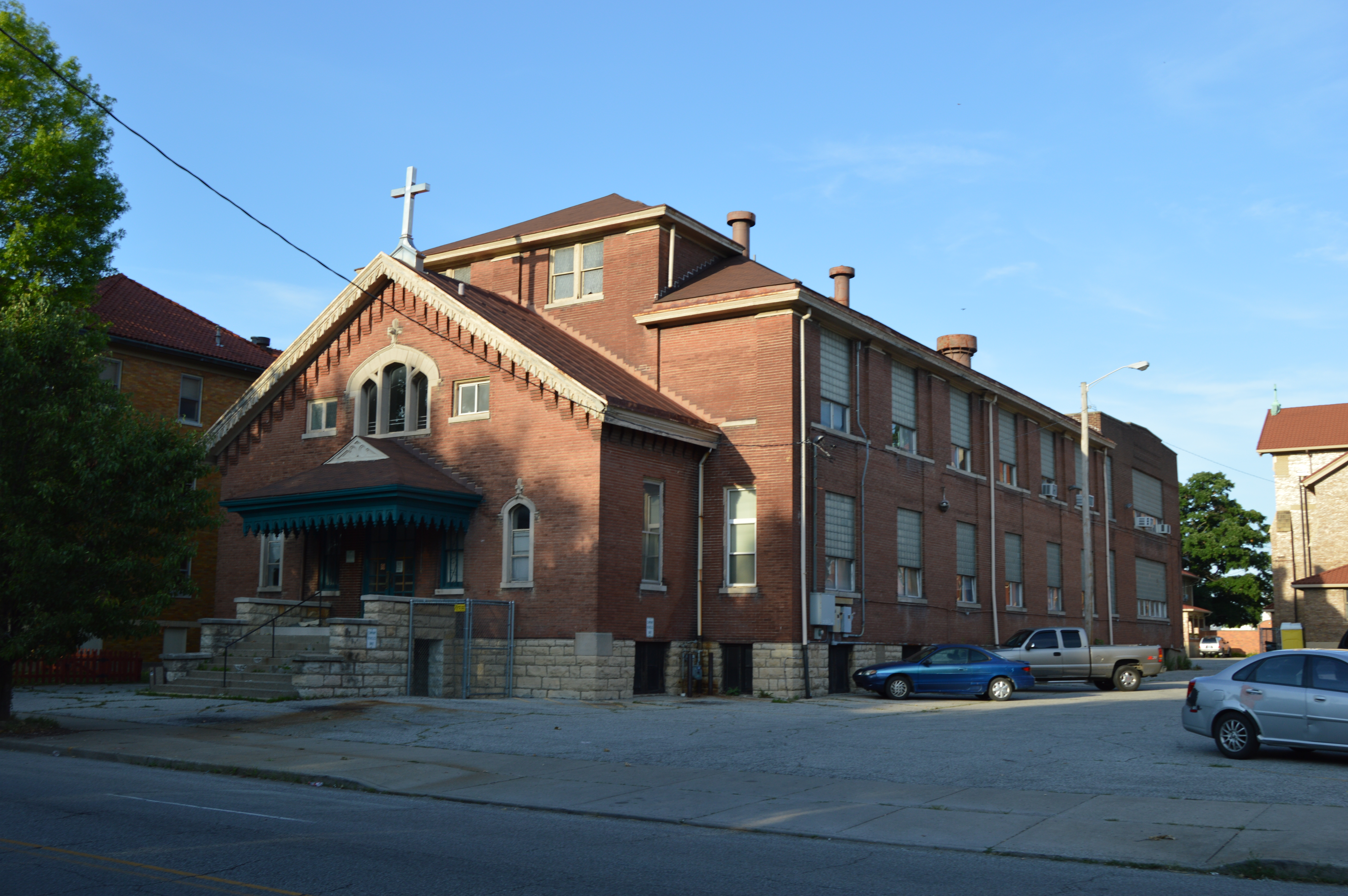
- Front and southern side

- Location within Kentucky Location within the United States
- Location: 2920 and 2914 S. 3rd St. and 2911 and 2921 S. 4th St., Louisville, Kentucky
- Coordinates: 38°12′24″N 85°45′51″W
- Area: 1.6 acres (0.65 ha)
- Built: 1902
- Architect: Multiple
- Architectural style: Classical Revival, Late Gothic Revival, Romanesque
- NRHP reference No.: 82002712
- Added to NRHP: May 13, 1982

Holy Name Church Rectory, Convent and School is a historic church at 2920 and 2914 S. 3rd Street and 2911 and 2921 S. 4th Street in Louisville, Kentucky.
