= Holy Name Catholic Church (Kansas City, Missouri) =

Historic church in Missouri, United States

- U.S. National Register of Historic Places
- Location within Missouri Location within the United States
- Location: 2210 Benton Blvd., Kansas City, Missouri
- Coordinates: 39°5′5″N 94°32′57″W
- Area: less than one acre
- Built: 1928, demolished 2011
- Architect: Wight & Wight; et al.
- Architectural style: Late Gothic Revival
- NRHP reference No.: 03000964
- Added to NRHP: September 25, 2003

The Holy Name Catholic Church in Kansas City, Missouri was a building from 1928. It was listed on the National Register of Historic Places in 2003. The building was demolished in 2011. Some of the exterior stone was used to repair the facade of St. Peter's church, also in Kansas City.
