= Holy Name of Jesus Catholic School =

Coordinates: 28.6819389°N 80.8475543°W

Holy Name of Jesus School

Location
- 3060 N Highway A1A, Indialantic, FL 32903; Indialantic, Florida; USA

Information
- Type: Parochial, Day
- Established: 1964
- Founder: Holy Name of Jesus Church
- Principal: Mary Ann Irwin
- Grades: PK3-8
- Enrollment: 483
- Accreditation: Florida Catholic Conference
- Affiliation: The Roman Catholic Church
- Student:Teacher ratio: 19.6:1
- Website: http://www.hnj.org/school/

Holy Name of Jesus Catholic School (HNJ) is a Catholic private day school in Indialantic, Florida. The school is part of the parish of the Holy Name of Jesus and under the control of the Diocese of Orlando. Annual tuition in 2002 was $2350 for parishioners.

== Teaching and facilities ==
The school teaches grades Pre-Kindergarten through 8th grade. HNJ School is accredited by the Florida Catholic Conference. The principal is Jesse De Leon. There is an enrollment of 280 students, from preschool at 2.5 years through 8th grade.

HNJ teaches the basic subjects of History, Math, and English, Art, Music, Computers, Spanish, and Physical education.

There are 28 classrooms including science lab, STREAM Lab, Mac Lab, Tech Lab, music and art room. There are interactive boards in every classroom, all networked internally and hooked up to the Internet, two mobile iPad labs and there is also a computer lab with 30 computers with Internet access. Middle school students work from Chromebooks in every class, with many textbooks now coming to the digital format. Teaching in all grade levels integrates technology into the curriculum.

== Achievements and awards ==
- Winner of the 1999 “National Catholic Teacher Schools for Tomorrow, Innovation in Technology Award”
- Home & School Association winner of 2000 “Distinguished Home & School Award by the NCEA”
- National School Board Award in 2000
- National Distinguished Principal Award 2001.
- U.S. Department of Education Blue Ribbon School of Excellence 2001
- No Child Left Behind-Blue Ribbon School of Academic Excellence 2003
- 99.5% of parents volunteering 20 or more hours a year
- 90% retention rate for teachers
- An educational endowment fund of over $2M to help fund long-term objectives of the school
- The 8th grade students’ group scores on the Iowa Test of Basic Skills (ITBS) standardized test in 1999, were - Reading 99th percentile, Language 99th, Math 97th and total battery 99th. Only one percent of the nation scored higher.
- In 2000 the 6th-8th grade group scores on the ITBS were higher than the 6th- 8th grade scores in the Diocese of Orlando and in all the Catholic Schools in the state of Florida. The 2nd grade group score was in the 92nd percentile.
- In 2001, at the regional Science and Engineering Fair students won three 1st Places, six 2nd Places, four 3rd Places, and seven 4th Places. In 2000, at the same fair, HNJ won three 1st places, two 2nd Places, two 3rd Places.
- In the Florida State Science Fair, a 7th grader scored 2nd in the state in Junior Botany, and a 6th grader scored 4th in the state in Junior Physics.

In 2000, the school board won an award for effectiveness.

== Athletics ==
- Flag football
- Volleyball
- Basketball
- Baseball
- Tennis
- Soccer

== History ==
The children of HNJ parish attended Ascension School, which opened in September 1961, staffed by the Irish Sisters of Mercy, from Ardee, Ireland.

In March, 1964, the new school began with approximately 50 students attending classes in the church hall.

By September 1964, the school building was completed and housed the first four grades that school year. Each year an additional grade was added through the eighth grade. In 1965 portable buildings were added and in 1968 a kindergarten class was opened.

The HNJ School Board’s five-year plan, which included five new classrooms, was completed in time for the 1998-99 school year.

In 2009 there were 260 students enrolled in PK-8.

Principals of HNJ School
1. Sister Monica 1964-1969? Sister of Mercy, Ardee, Ireland
2. Sister Rosari 1969?-1974 Sisters of Mercy, Ardee, Ireland
3. Sister Jane, OP (1974–76)
4. Sister Janet, OP 1976-1977, joint principal with
5. Sister Ruth, joint principal (1976–77)
6. Sister Shirley Hinks, (1977–1980)
7. Sister Rosemary Conlon OP (1980–84)
8. Sister Kathleen Gelatko LSF (1984–85)
9. Joyce Falk (1985–86)
10. Duane Schafer (1986–89)
11. Bruce Tepfer (1989–92)
12. Lois Scrivener (1992–2006)
13. Sister Teresa Bruno (2006–2009)
14. Ms. MaryEllen Massey 2009-2012)
15. Sister Joseph Barden (2012–2012)
16. Mary Ann Irwin (2012-
