= Holy Name of Mary Catholic Secondary School =

High school in Brampton, Canada

Coordinates: 43.7338°N 79.7164°W

Location
- 115 Glenvale Blvd; Brampton, Ontario, L6S 3J7; Canada

Information
- School type: Separate High School
- Motto: "Act justly, Love tenderly, Walk humbly with our God"
- Religious affiliation: Roman Catholic
- Founded: 1964; relocated 2008
- School board: Dufferin-Peel Catholic District School Board
- Superintendent: Les Storey
- Principal: Claudia Lehecka
- Grades: 9 to 12
- Enrolment: 646 (as of October 31, 2020)
- Language: English
- Area: Brampton East
- Colours: Blue & Gold
- Mascot: Lola the Lion
- Team name: Royals
- Website: hnmry.dpcdsb.org

Holy Name of Mary Catholic Secondary School is an all-girls regional high school in Brampton, Ontario, Canada founded by the Felician Sisters. Originally located in Mississauga, it relocated to Brampton in 2008.

Holy Name of Mary Catholic Secondary School is the only single-sex school in the Dufferin-Peel Catholic District School Board.

== History ==
Both Holy Name of Mary Catholic Secondary School and Holy Name of Mary College School can trace their origin to the original Holy Name of Mary School (HNM) founded September 7, 1964, by the Felician Sisters. Founded as a private school on Mississauga Road, the Felician Sisters entered into an agreement with the Dufferin-Peel Separate School Board in 1972 making Grades 9 and 10 publicly funded. In 1984, the Ontario government announced full funding for Catholic high schools, and by 1987 Holy Name was funded up to Grade 13.

The last Felician Sister to teach in the school was in 1998.

In a document dated January 3, 2005, the Dufferin-Peel Catholic District School Board released a planning committee report on the future of the school including options: (1) relocate the students to the vacant Loyala facility. (2) purchase the school from the Sisters (3) open a single gender boys' school (4) withdraw from single-sex school education.

The Planning Committee recommended option 1. This recommendation included opening "a consultation process with the Felician Sisters, staff, parents, and students to obtain feedback on all motions approved."

A June 2007 Star article stated, "Two years ago, the board tried to move the school to another, less attractive location, but parents resisted. Then, the provincial supervisor – who runs the board – axed busing. Parents, however, rallied and arranged for busing on their own. There are more than 600 kids on the bus, out of the 875 at the school, said Charlene Amlinger, chair of the parent council. She said the lack of board-funded transportation may have been the "final straw" for the sisters." "The plight of Holy Name for each year for the last 10 years, whether transportation or relocation – it's been arduous."

In a Toronto Star article published in 2007, Holy Name of Mary School was considered one of the finest schools in Ontario. That same year, two years after the submission of the Planning Committee's report, the Felician Sisters terminated the lease with the Dufferin-Peel Catholic District School Board for the Mississauga Road building effective September 2008. The Felician Sisters made this decision, "because they didn’t believe the board was committed to maintaining an all-girls school, said spokesperson Sr. Andrea Rita Marie Kowalczyk." "We’ve been committed to this (all-girls education) for over 40 years. We weren’t going to drop the ball now," said Kowalczyk. Where the provincially funded board would only commit to a five-year lease with a 15-month opt out clause, the sisters now have a 20-year lease with an option for either party to terminate the lease after five years.

Despite the length of time between the board's decision and the Felician Sisters termination of the lease, staff and students at the school seemed ill-prepared for the reality of moving. "When the Felician Sisters’ decision regarding the future of Holy Name was announced last Friday, a shockwave went through the school. It was as if someone had died. Staff and students found themselves at a loss for words and, instead, resorted to tears and hugs." A student, Stephanie Paddley stated, "I pray the Board will recognize what a gem Holy Name is, and make an effort to preserve what we have, even if it means switching buildings, and getting a new name."

In 2007 the separate board committed itself to keeping the original Holy Name community open as a publicly funded girls' school and, although the vacated Loyola facility was mentioned in the report, decided to use a vacant school site in Brampton as its permanent new home. Holy Name of Mary Catholic Secondary School welcomed students to the Glenvale Boulevard location in September 2008 (the building was originally the first home of nearby St. Thomas Aquinas SS). The school's re-dedication of its new building in Brampton was held on February 11, 2009. The guests included Felician Sisters, Trustees, Board Staff, teachers, alumni, former Principals, clergy and Archbishop Thomas Christopher Collins. The ceremony included a papal blessing for the school.

During the 2019-2020 school year the school underwent a $10.3M renovation, which included a 17-classroom, 2-storey rear addition. Due to the COVID-19 pandemic, the school delayed its reopening until January 2021.

== Change to semester system ==
The school implemented a semester system in September, 2011. Until the end of the 2010/2011 school year, the school followed a non-semester system. The change met considerable opposition from school administration, teachers, parents, and students. The issue of changing from a non-semestered system had been raised as early as May 2004.

== Fraser Institute ranking ==
The Fraser Institute's 2024 report on Holy Name of Mary Secondary School gave it an overall grade of 7.2/10, ranking it at 178 of 747 secondary schools in Ontario.

== Community service ==
Pumped in Pink: An awareness and fundraising campaign for breast cancer raised $8293.96 in October, 2010. It is an ongoing service. In 2025 they raised about $965.78.

== See also ==
- Education in Ontario
- List of secondary schools in Ontario
