= Cathedral of the Holy Name, Mumbai =

Cathedral of the Holy Name
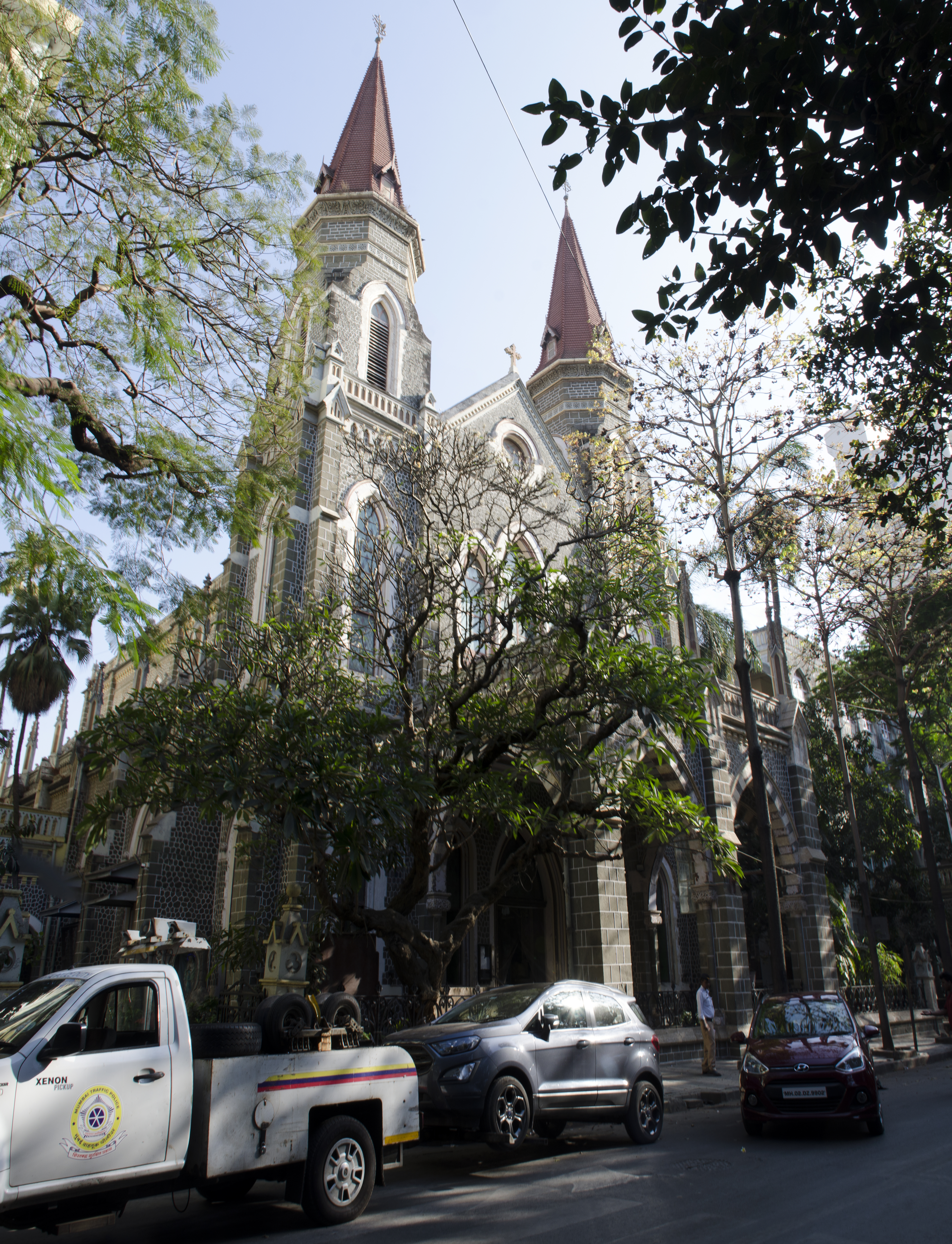
- Façade of Cathedral of the Holy Name in 2020
- Cathedral of the Holy Name
- 18°55′24″N 72°49′50″E
- Location: Colaba, Mumbai
- Country: India
- Denomination: Roman Catholic
- Website: www.cathedraloftheholyname.in

History
- Status: Cathedral

Architecture
- Functional status: Active
- Style: Gothic Revival
- Completed: 1905; 121 years ago

Clergy
- Archbishop: Cardinal Oswald Gracias

The Cathedral of the Holy Name or Holy Name Cathedral is a Roman Catholic cathedral in the Indian city of Mumbai (Bombay), that has the seat and is the headquarters of the Archbishop of Bombay. The cathedral is located in the Colaba area of South Bombay, built in the Gothic Revival style that was favoured by British architects.

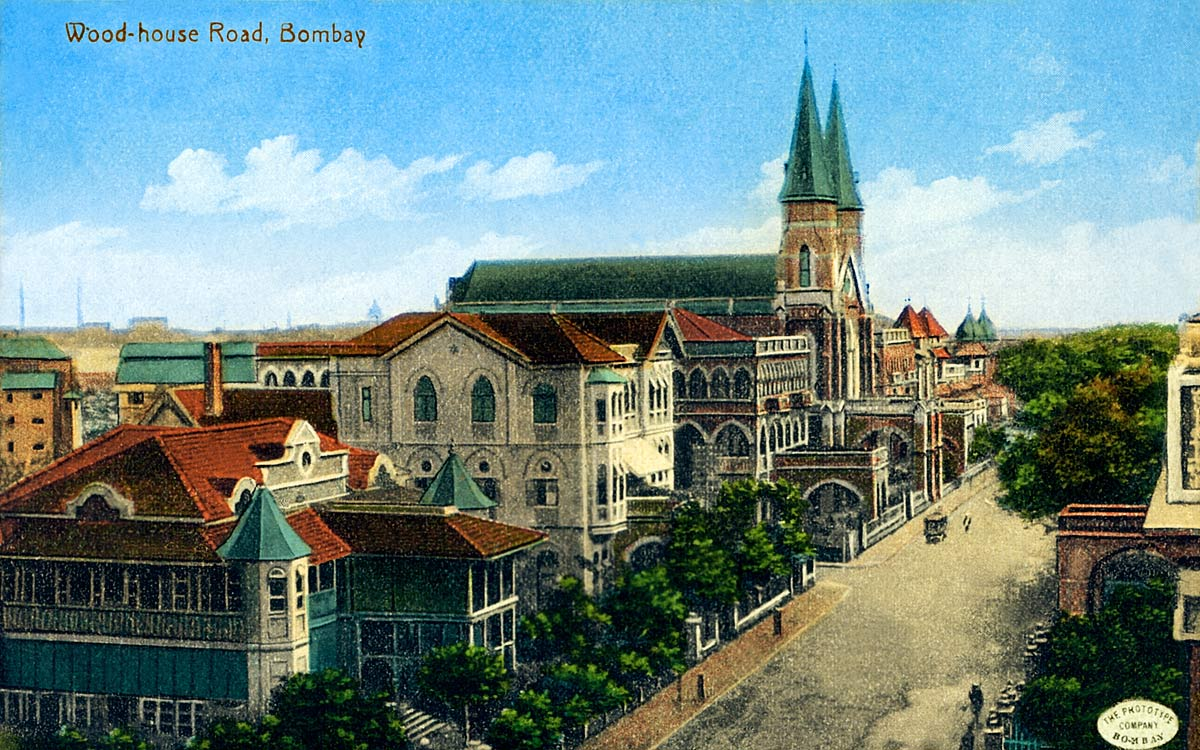
Old postcard of the wood-house road, Bombay, with the Cathedral of the Holy Name.

The Holy Name Cathedral was built in 1905 as a church, but designated a cathedral in 1964. It is contained within the premises of the Holy Name High School, founded in 1939.

During the Bombay plague epidemic that struck the city of Bombay (present-day Mumbai) in the early 1900s, the church worked to aid the victims of plague by providing them food and shelter.

== Architecture ==
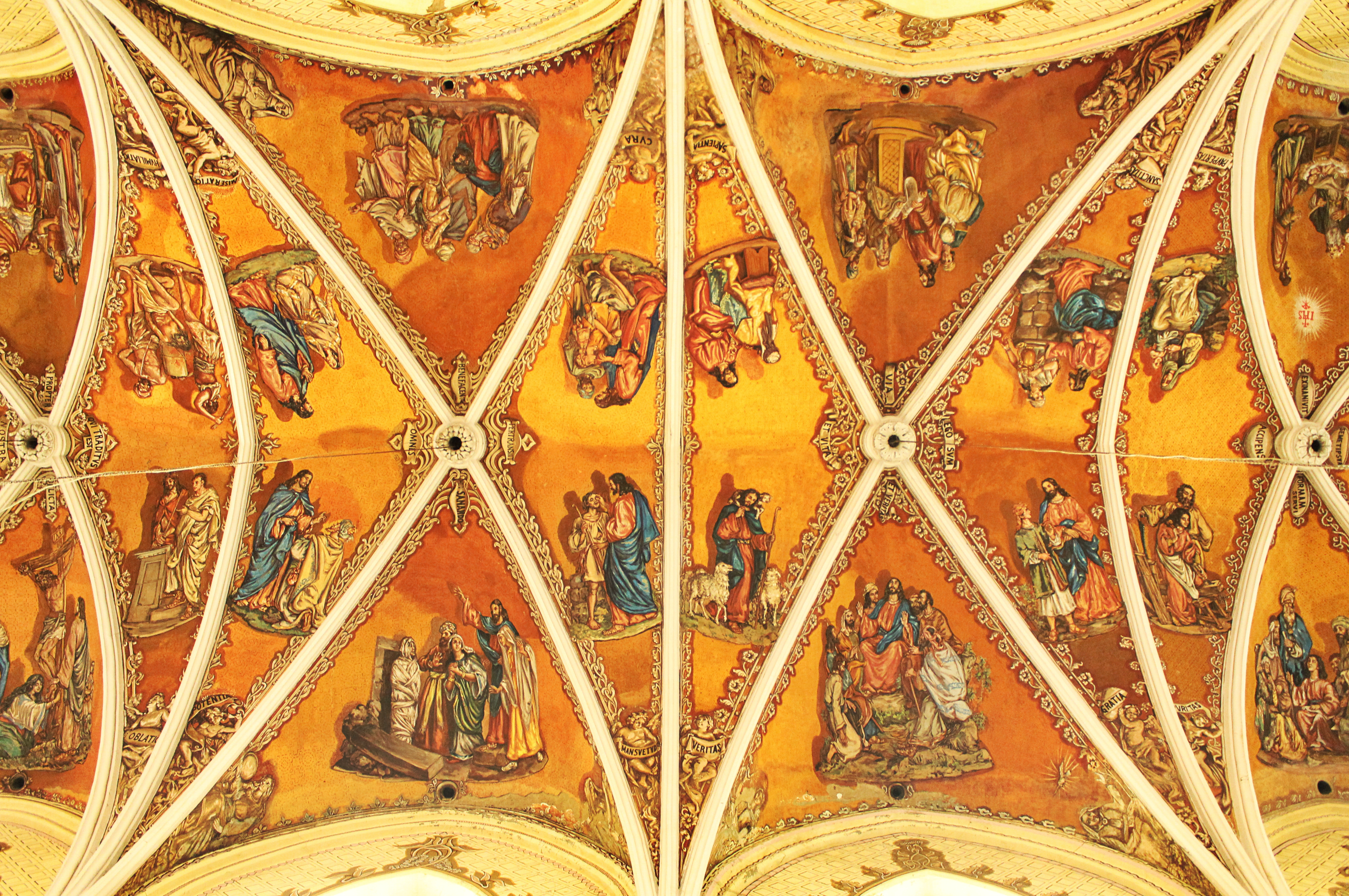
The fresco covered vaulted ceilings
