= Patrick Barry (bishop) =

Catholic bishop

His Excellency, The Most Reverend Patrick Joseph Barry
- Bishop of St. Augustine
- Church: Roman Catholic Church
- See: Diocese of St. Augustine
- In office: May 3, 1922 to August 12, 1940
- Predecessor: Michael Joseph Curley
- Successor: Joseph Patrick Hurley

Orders
- Ordination: June 9, 1895 by Michael Comerford
- Consecration: May 3, 1922 by Michael Joseph Curley

Personal details
- Born: November 15, 1868 County Clare, Ireland
- Died: August 12, 1940 (aged 71) Jacksonville, Florida, US
- Education: Mungret College; St Patrick's, Carlow College
- Motto: Gentium custos Deus (God is the guardian of the nations)

Patrick Joseph Barry DD (November 15, 1868 – August 12, 1940) was an Irish-born prelate of the Roman Catholic Church. He served as bishop of the Diocese of St. Augustine in Florida from 1922 until his death in 1940.

== Biography ==
=== Early life ===
Patrick Barry was born on November 15, 1868, in County Clare, Ireland, one of 18 children of Michael and Catherine (née Dixon) Barry. After attending national school, he enrolled at Mungret College in Limerick, Ireland, in 1887, taking exams in the Royal University of Ireland from which he graduated. In 1890, he began his studies for the priesthood at St. Patrick's College in Carlow, Ireland. As a seminarian, he was recruited to serve the missions in Florida in the United States.

=== Priesthood ===
Barry was ordained a priest by Bishop Michael Comerford in Carlow for the Diocese of St. Augustine on June 9, 1895. After his ordination, Barry immigrated to Florida, where he was appointed as a curate at Immaculate Conception Parish in Jacksonville. He later worked as a chaplain in 1898 for the US Armed Forces during the Spanish–American War. After the war, Barry served as pastor of St. Monica's Parish in Palatka, Florida (1903–1913), and then as rector of St. Augustine's Cathedral and as vicar general of the diocese (1917–1921).

=== Bishop of St. Augustine ===
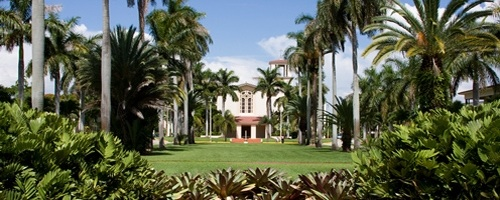
Barry University, Miami Shores, Florida (2010)

On February 22, 1922, Barry was appointed the fifth bishop of St. Augustine by Pope Pius XI. He received his episcopal consecration at Saint Augustine Cathedral in St. Augustine on May 3, 1922, from Archbishop Michael Curley, with Bishops John J. Monaghan and William Turner serving as co-consecrators.

In 1931, Barry instituted an annual pilgrimage to the Shrine of Our Lady of La Leche at the Mission Nombre de Dios in St. Augustine. The goal was to draw attention to the Catholic heritage of St. Augustine. In June 1932, Barry traveled with Cardinal Patrick Hayes to the World Eucharistic Congress in Dublin, Ireland. In 1940, Barry founded Barry University in Miami Shores, Florida, along with his sister, Mother M. Gerald Barry, and his brother, Father William Barry.

=== Death ===
Patrick Barry died from heart disease at St. Vincent's Hospital in Jacksonville, on August 12, 1940, at age 71.

Catholic Church titles
Preceded by Michael Joseph Curley	Bishop of St. Augustine; 1922–1940	Succeeded by Joseph Patrick Hurley
