= William John Kenny =

Catholic bishop

His Excellency, The Right Reverend William John Kenny
- Bishop of St. Augustine
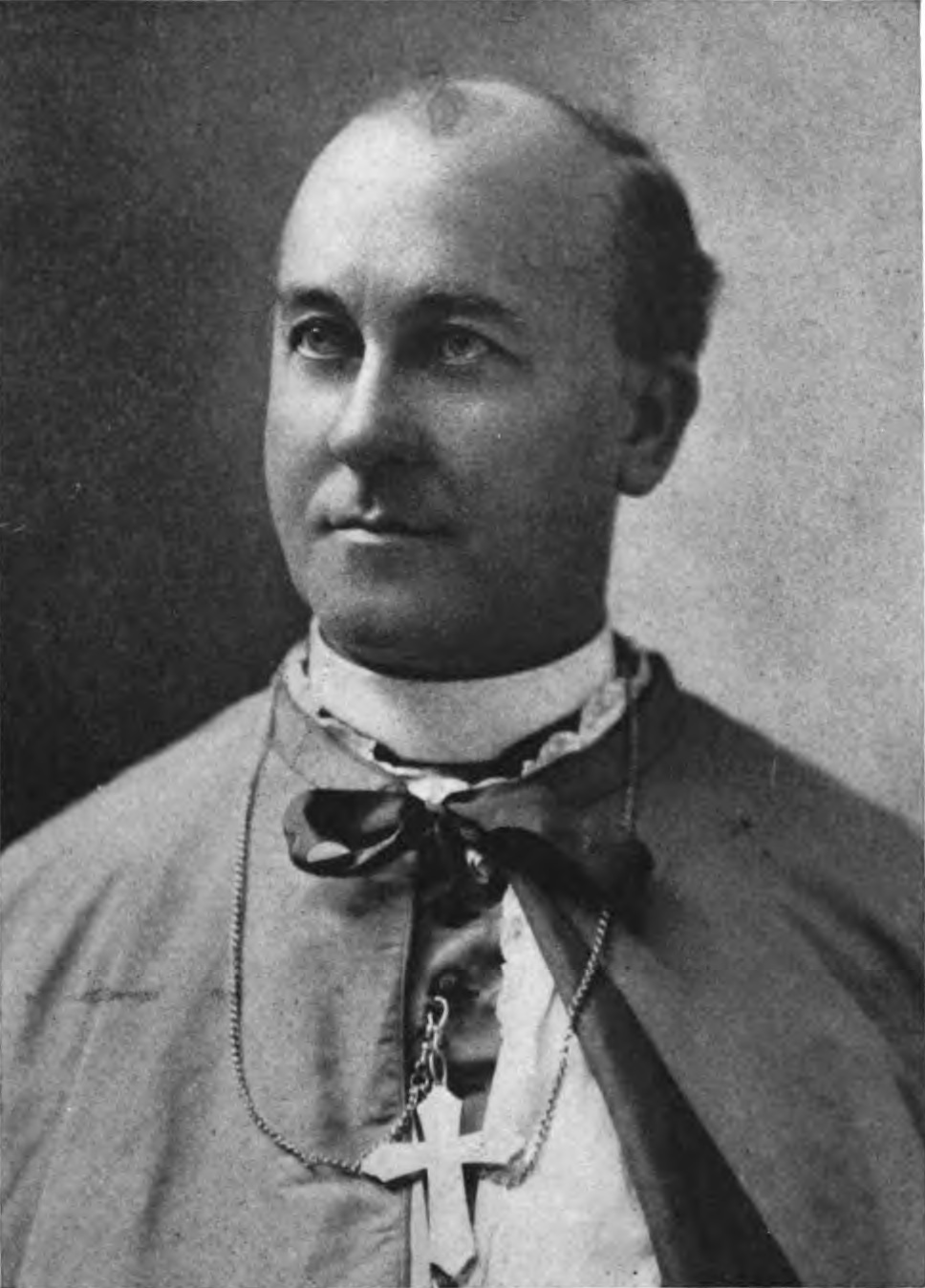
- See: Diocese of St. Augustine
- In office: March 25, 1902 - October 24, 1913
- Predecessor: John Moore
- Successor: Michael Joseph Curley

Orders
- Ordination: January 15, 1879 by John Moore
- Consecration: March 25, 1902 by James Gibbons

Personal details
- Born: January 12, 1853 Delhi, New York, USA
- Died: October 24, 1913 (aged 60) Baltimore, Maryland, USA
- Denomination: Roman Catholic
- Education: St. Bonaventure University

William John Kenny (January 12, 1853 – October 24, 1913) was an American prelate of the Roman Catholic Church. He served as bishop of the Diocese of St. Augustine in Florida from 1902 until his death in 1913.

== Biography ==
=== Early life ===
Kenny was born on January 12, 1853, in Delhi, New York, to John and Ann (née McDonough) Kenny. As a youth, he worked in Scranton, Pennsylvania, in newspaper jobs. After saving enough money for his seminary education, he entered St. Bonaventure University near Olean, New York.

=== Priesthood ===
On January 15, 1879, Kenny was ordained to the priesthood in St. Augustine, Florida, for the Diocese of St. Augustine by Bishop John Moore.

After his ordination, the diocese assigned Kenny as curate at Immaculate Conception Parish, the only parish in Jacksonville, Florida. After a few months there, he was assigned as pastor of a mission church in Palatka, Florida, remaining there for three years. In June 1884, Kenny returned to Immaculate Conception to serve as pastor. During his tenure as pastor, he became active in civic organizations and community service associations. Kenny led relief efforts during yellow fever outbreak of 1888, tending to the sick until he contracted the disease himself. Moore named Kenny as his vicar general in 1889.

During the Great Fire of 1901, Immaculate Conception Church and the other Catholic properties in Jacksonville were destroyed. Kenny again worked with civic leaders to address the crisis Moore named Kenny as his vicar general in 1889.Two months after the fire, Moore died. The priests in the diocese elected Kenny as the apostolic administrator to temporarily operated the diocese.

=== Bishop of St. Augustine ===
On March 25, 1902, Kenny was appointed the third bishop of Augustine by Pope Leo XIII. He was the diocese's first American-born bishop. He received his episcopal consecration on May 18, 1902, from Cardinal James Gibbons, with Bishops Benjamin Keiley and Leo Michael Haid serving as co-consecrators, in the Cathedral of St. Augustine.

After the fire, Kenny was left with only the clothes on his back. In recognition of his service during the fire, the citizens of Jacksonville, both Catholic and non-Catholic, raised $2,092 for his personal use.

During his tenure as bishop, Kenny increased the recruitment of Irish priests and nuns, reorganized diocesan offices, expanded missionary efforts to Florida's interior and smaller towns, and more than doubled diocesan fundraising. He also established the first Catholic parish for African Americans in Florida.

=== Death ===
While traveling to the American Missionary Congress in Boston, Massachusetts, in October 1913, Kenny stopped in Baltimore to visit St. Mary's Seminary. After falling ill at the seminary, he was hospitalized. William Kenny died on October 24, 1913, in Baltimore at age 60.Bishop Kenny High School in Jacksonville is named for him.

== Episcopal succession ==
Catholic Church titles
Preceded by John Moore	Bishop of St. Augustine; 1902–1913	Succeeded by Michael Joseph Curley
