= Bishop Kenny High School =

American private Catholic high school

Location
- 1055 Kingman Avenue; Jacksonville, (Duval County), Florida 32207; United States
- 30°18′33″N 81°38′26″W

Information
- Type: Private, Coeducational
- Religious affiliation: Roman Catholic
- Established: 1952
- Founder: Archbishop John P. Hurley
- Oversight: Diocese of St. Augustine
- Principal: Todd Orlando
- Athletic Director: Mark Thorson
- Faculty: 84
- Grades: 9–12
- Campus: Urban Riverfront
- Campus size: 55 acres (0.22 km^{2})
- Colors: Red, Black, and White
- Slogan: "Preparing young people for college and for life"
- Team name: Crusaders
- Rival: Bolles School; Episcopal School of Jacksonville
- Accreditation: Southern Association of Colleges and Schools
- Publication: The Avenue
- Newspaper: The Shield
- Yearbook: Crusader
- Tuition: $7,020-$9,900
- Alumni: 16,000+
- Website: bishopkenny.org

Bishop Kenny High School (commonly referred to as Bishop Kenny or BKHS) is a private, college-preparatory, coeducational Catholic high school in Jacksonville, Florida. It is located in and administered by the Roman Catholic Diocese of St. Augustine. The founder Archbishop Joseph Patrick Hurley established the school in 1952, following the merger of three previous Catholic high schools in the Jacksonville area. Bishop Kenny High School was renamed in honor of William John Kenny, the third bishop of the Diocese of St. Augustine.

Bishop Kenny High School is fully accredited by the Southern Association of Colleges and Schools. Bishop Kenny holds membership in the National Catholic Education Association, the Florida Catholic Conference, The College Board, the National Association for College Admission Counseling, and the Florida High School Athletic Association.

Bishop Kenny's sports teams, commonly known by their "Crusaders" nickname, are sanctioned by the Florida High School Activities Association (FHSAA). In their 60-year history, the school's varsity sports teams have won thirty-seven state team championships.

Among Bishop Kenny's alumni are the computer scientist Philip Don Estridge, the federal administrator Jim Towey, musicians Billy Powell and Virgil Roger du Pont III, the MLB All-Star Jonathan Papelbon, MLB player Ben Gamel, television host and model Yoanna House, Jacksonville Mayor Donna Deegan, and head coach Pat McMahon.

== History ==
In 1952 three area Catholic high schools were consolidated as Central Catholic High School under the direction of Archbishop John P. Hurley. In 1953 Central Catholic was re-dedicated and named for Bishop William John Kenny, the third bishop of the Roman Catholic Diocese of St. Augustine.

In 1989, Father Michael Houle was named President of Bishop Kenny. Over the last 20 years more than $20 million have been raised and invested to improve the school. In 2015 Father Michael Houle announced his retirement as President of Bishop Kenny, ending the tradition of Priests as Presidents.

=== Geography and setting ===
Bishop Kenny High School is located on 55 acres of riverfront property and can be found in the historic Southbank neighborhood of Saint Nicholas. The back of the campus is adjacent to the Saint Johns River. The school is located within the heart of the Jacksonville Metropolitan Area, a growing metropolitan center with a population of more than 1.5 million people.

Prior to the school being established it was once the site of a Spanish fortress, and in more modern times the property served as a shipyard during World War I.

=== Spiritual affiliation ===
Founded in the Catholic tradition, Bishop Kenny has retained its spiritual affiliation in an era when many other institutions have relinquished theirs. The majority of the students are Catholic, however they also have students from a variety of religious backgrounds and secular traditions. The students may attend services at the Paul F. Tanner Chapel which are conducted regularly.

=== School facts ===
- 15 varsity sports offered
- 48 percent faculty with or attaining graduate degrees
- 36 after-school clubs and activities
- $9.9 million in college scholarships and grants offered to 2017 graduating class
- 37 total state athletic championships won

== Admissions ==
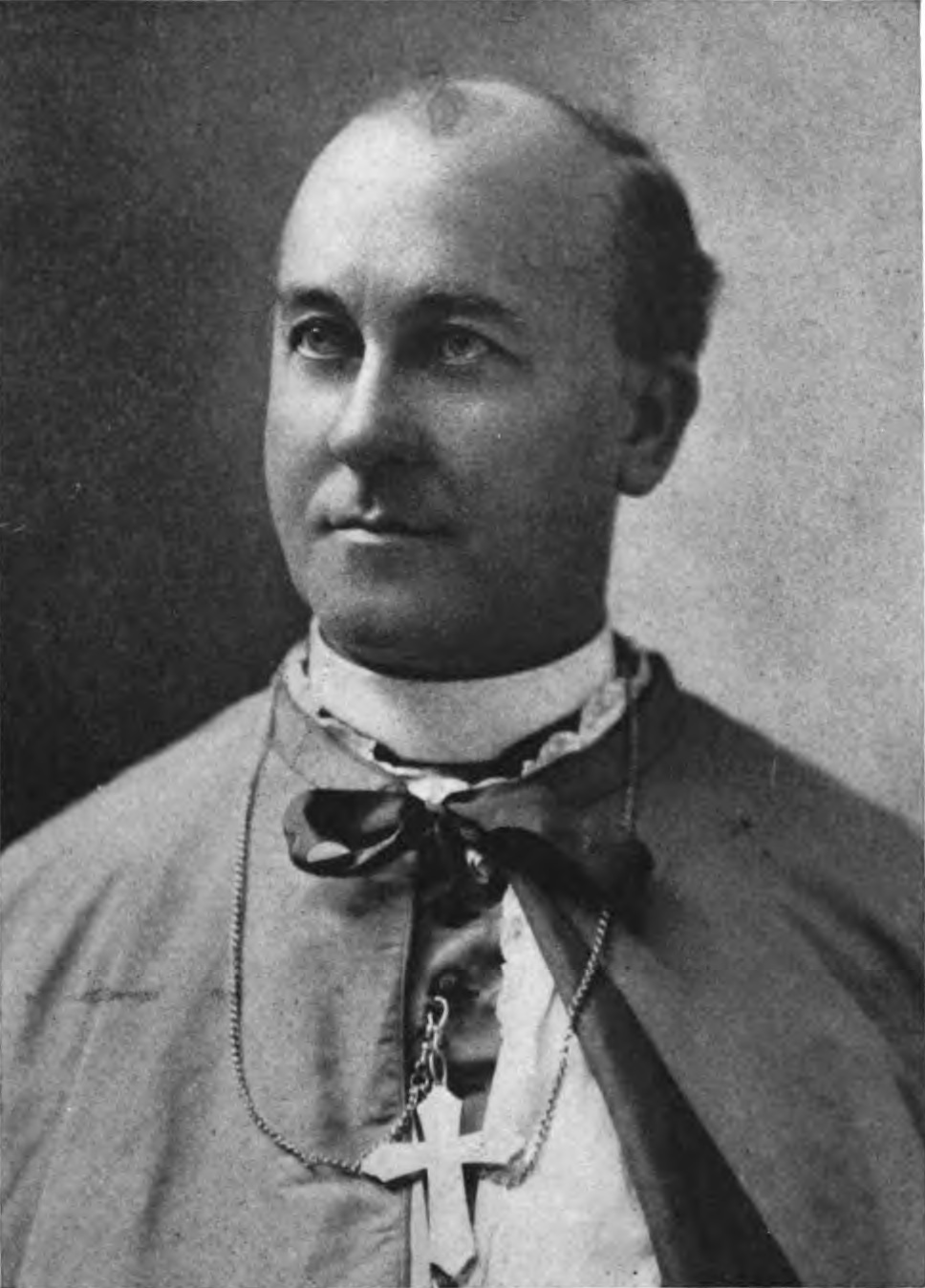
BKHS was named after Archbishop Kenny the Bishop of St. Augustine from 1902 to 1913.

The primary admissions entry point for Bishop Kenny is in 9th grade, with varying transfer opportunities offered in 10th and 11th grades. Transfer is not allowed going into the senior year, unless the student is transferring from a Catholic or Jesuit Highschool from outside of the Jacksonville area. Admission is based on standardized test scores; recommendations, grade point average, and involvement in extracurricular activities. After an application is completed, then the student must go through a formal interview process.

=== Statistical profile ===
Bishop Kenny currently enrolls 1,308 students. Minority populations constitute about 21 percent of the student body, including 5 percent African-Americans, 8 percent Hispanics, and 4 percent Asian-Americans or Pacific Islanders.

== Dress code ==
A student uniform is required. Male students are required to wear navy blue pants, white button down dress shirts, belts, embroidered ties, and brown or black dress shoes, with socks. Girls are required to wear uniform skirts, white button down blouses, and black or brown dress shoes and socks.

== Traditions ==
Homecoming week signals a week of accessorizing the school uniform in a daily themed schedule, which may include "Western day", "College day", and "Color Your Class".

Class colors are voted on by the student government and are traditionally: freshmen yellow, sophomores orange, juniors blue, seniors pink. Other traditions include athletic events with rivals The Bolles School and Episcopal School of Jacksonville.

"Yearbook Presents" is a ticket-only event held during the final week of senior classes in which the Drumline appears, a teacher produced skit imitating the most popular seniors is performed, and a multimedia presentation of Senior memories is shown.

== Tuition ==
Tuition to Bishop Kenny for the 2019–2020 school year is $8,020 for Catholic students and $12,900 for non-Catholic students. In addition, the cost for funding 2 Catholic students is $12,940, and the cost for funding 3 or more Catholic students is $17,420. There are also registration fees of $1,200 per academic year.

== Academics ==
Every student at Bishop Kenny is involved in a rigorous college preparatory curriculum. Honors and Advanced Placement sections exist in each of the curricular disciplines. Admissions are based on grades, an entrance exam, and various other criteria. Bishop Kenny is known for its academic rigor, and the diploma requirements exceed the requirements for a Florida high school diploma.

=== Faculty ===
The faculty at Bishop Kenny includes a total of 83 men and women. Approximately half of the faculty hold advanced degrees (master's or doctorates). Faculty members are state certified teachers with an average teaching experience of 17 years. Bishop Kenny High School is fully accredited by the Southern Association of Colleges and Schools (SACS).

Bishop Kenny High School has an honor system, which is formally known as the Honor Code. Students are obligated to follow the Honor Code and are expected to protect the privilege and not tolerate any violations.

=== Service ===
Bishop Kenny places a particularly strong emphasis on community service, encouraging their students to serve the community. All students are required to fulfill community service requirements of 25 hours per academic year. If a students fails to complete the service requirements, then they will face an academic penalty. During the 2016–2017 academic year the student body performed 17,248 hours of community service.

=== AP curriculum ===
Advanced Placement (AP) courses includes the following:

- Drawing
- 2-D Design
- 3-D Design
- Biology
- Chemistry
- Physics B
- Calculus AB
- Calculus BC
- Computer Science
- Statistics
- English Language
- English Literature
- Spanish Language
- Macroeconomics
- World History
- United States History
- United States Government and Politics

=== Junior Reserve Officer Training Corps ===
Bishop Kenny has a prestigious Navy Junior Reserve Officers Training Corps. Officially founded in 1973, it is one of the largest programs in the state. The program teaches discipline, honor, and dedication through the uniform inspections, drill instruction, and academics placed in the hands of the students.

The curriculum teaches four naval science courses for students who are in the program. The program is sponsored by the United States Navy and has a staff of two retired military personnel.

=== Student newspaper ===
The Shield is the student paper. In spring 2009, The Florida Times-Union bestowed the Henry A. Blumenthal Memorial Trophy to The Shield. This is an annual High School Journalism Awards contest for the best student newspaper in the Jacksonville area. The Shield also was awarded the Campus & Community Coverage award for the 2010–11 and 2011–12 academic years.

== Athletics ==
Bishop Kenny's athletic sports teams, known as the "Crusaders", compete in the Florida High School Athletic Association (FHSAA).

Athletic competition has long been a part of the Bishop Kenny tradition. In the 1970s the William H. Johnston Football Stadium was built and included bleachers, concession stands, and a press box. In addition the stadium is located on the St. Johns River, and is directly across the river from TIAA Bank Field (home of the Jacksonville Jaguars). The school won its first state championship in men's basketball in 1957, and the Baldwin Gymnasium (named after the late Kenny basketball coach John Baldwin) was completed in October 1961, which was the largest in the city of Jacksonville at the time.

Bishop Kenny competes in sports against schools from throughout the state of Florida. Teams are fielded at the varsity, junior varsity, and freshmen levels. There are 20 different sports in interscholastic competition. The athletic program has been awarded as the top program numerous times by the Jacksonville Sports Hall of Fame. In addition, the school field teams in every sport sanctioned by the Florida High School Athletic Association.

The official colors are red and white. The school offers 10 girls' sports and 12 boys' sports. Bishop Kenny maintains athletic rivalries with the Bolles Bulldogs and Episcopal Eagles.

Male

- Baseball
- Basketball
- Cross country
- Football
- Golf
- Sailing
- Soccer
- Swimming and diving
- Tennis
- Track and field
- Weightlifting
- Wrestling

Female

- Basketball
- Cross country
- Golf
- Sailing
- Soccer
- Softball
- Swimming and diving
- Tennis
- Track and field
- Volleyball

=== Athletic facilities ===
Bishop Kenny has several athletic facilities, such as the John Baldwin Athletic Center, a multi-purpose arena and home to the basketball teams and volleyball team. William Johnston Stadium is home to the football team and the track & field teams. The Abbie Lenahan Tennis Courts are home to the tennis teams (which consists of 6 courts). In addition, Bishop Kenny has a baseball stadium, multiple weight rooms, the Roger Strickland Field House, and a softball field.

=== Championships ===
In their 60-year history of athletic competition, Bishop Kenny's varsity athletic teams have won 40 state championships as of 2020.

Girls' state championships (15 team; 7 relay)
Basketball	1990, 1991, 1992
Cross country	1994, 1995, 1996, 1997, 1998, 1999, 2000, 2008, 2023
Track (relay)	1995, 1997, 1998, 2003, 2004, 2007, 2008
Volleyball	1999, 2014, 2020
Soccer	2020

Boys' state championships (15 team; 4 relay)
Baseball	2002, 2008
Basketball	1957
Cross country	1991, 1992, 1993, 2000, 2002, 2003, 2009, 2012
Soccer	1973
Swimming	2004, 2021, 2022, 2023, 2025
Track (team)	1991, 1992
Track (relay)	1995, 1997, 1998, 2000

== Alumni affairs ==
The Bishop Kenny Booster Club (BK Boosters) is an alumni organization and booster club for the school. It is a membership organization for alumni and friends, as it does not require one to be a graduate. In addition, Bishop Kenny's academics & athletics have been supported by this organization for over 30 years. In total the BK Boosters have raised over $3.5 million to support the school's athletic and extra-curricular programs. The BK Boosters serve the school through programs, events, and services targeted at alumni and friends. Some of the programs include membership options, golf tournaments, auctions, and tuition raffles.

== People ==
=== Presidents ===
The president of Bishop Kenny served as the principal executive officer for the school. Bishop Kenny has had many individuals lead it throughout its history:

- Monsignor Terence Farrelly (1952–1956)
- Monsignor Mortimer Danaher (1956–1967)
- Monsignor Daniel Logan (1970–1989)
- Father Michael Houle (1989–2015)

=== Notable alumni ===
Bishop Kenny has over 16,000 alumni and a large number of them are supporters of the school after they graduate. The following is a select list of notable alumni of Bishop Kenny High School sorted by last name:

- Philip Don Estridge (1955) - Computer specialist, known as "Father of the IBM PC"
- Roger Strickland (1958) - Former professional basketball player with National Basketball Association
- Maxey Dell Moody III (1961) - Former CEO of M. D. Moody & Sons, Inc.
- Pat McMahon (1971) - Former head coach for the Florida Gators and Mississippi State Bulldogs baseball baseball teams, current head coach for the Staten Island Yankees
- Billy Powell (1970) - Keyboardist of Southern rock band Lynyrd Skynyrd
- H. James Towey (1974) - Former president of Saint Vincent College, and director of the White House Office of Faith-Based and Community Initiatives
- Megan Blake (1976) - pet lifestyle expert and co-host of PBS show Animal Attractions, actress, and Miss Georgia in 1983.
- Donna Deegan (1979) - current mayor of JacksonvilleFormer weekday anchor for WTLV/WJXX
- Ernest Gibson (1979) - Former NFL player for the New England Patriots and Miami Dolphins
- P. Gardner Howe III (1980) - Retired United States Navy vice admiral, Navy SEAL, and associate director for military affairs at the Central Intelligence Agency; retired 55th President of the Naval War College and former Commander, Special Operations Command Pacific
- Toni Yates (1980) - Current news reporter and anchorwoman for WABC-TV
- Joi Williams Felton(1984) - Current head coach for UCF Women's Basketball 2007–present.
- Tommy Raffo (1986) - Former MLB baseball prospect with the Cincinnati Reds, and current head baseball coach for Arkansas State University
- Todd Dunn (1988) - Former MLB baseball player for the Milwaukee Brewers
- Virgil Roger du Pont III (1989) - Founding member and lead singer of the band The Crüxshadows
- Kevin Witt (1994) - Former MLB baseball player for the Toronto Blue Jays, and the St. Louis Cardinals
- Sam Rivers (non-graduate) - Current bassist, and co-founder of the band Limp Bizkit
- Travis Chapman (1996) - Former MLB baseball player for the Philadelphia Phillies, and currently first base / infielders coach for the New York Yankees.
- Kevin Gilbride, Jr. (1998) - Currently tight ends coach for the Chicago Bears of the National Football League and former tight ends coach for New York Giants
- Yoanna House (1998) - American fashion model. Winner of America's Next Top Model
- Jonathan Papelbon (1999) - Former MLB baseball player and closer for the Boston Red Sox and Philadelphia Phillies - |
- Darren O'Day (2001) - Current Major League Current Pitcher for the Atlanta Braves and former pitcher for the Baltimore Orioles.
- Mat Gamel (2003) - Major League Baseball player
- Alejandro Taylor (2007) - Current professional soccer player with Liga de Honra
- Ben Gamel (2010) - Major League Baseball player
- John Wolford (2014) - National Football League quarterback for the Tampa Bay Buccaneers
