= Michael Joseph Curley =

Irish-born Catholic bishop (1879–1947)

His Excellency, The Most Reverend Michael Joseph Curley
- Archbishop of Baltimore-Washington
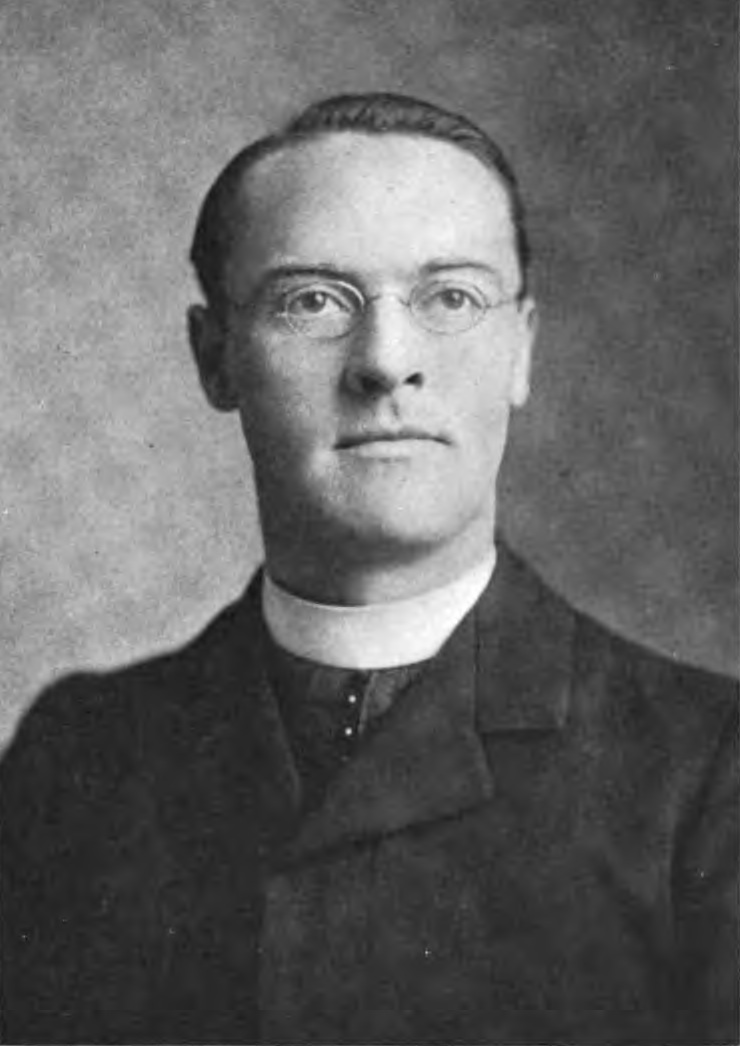
- See: Baltimore-Washington
- Appointed: August 10, 1921
- Installed: November 30, 1921
- Term ended: May 16, 1947
- Predecessor: James Gibbons
- Successor: Francis Patrick Keough (Baltimore); Patrick O'Boyle (Washington)
- Previous post: Bishop of St. Augustine (1914–1921)

Orders
- Ordination: March 19, 1904 by Pietro Respighi
- Consecration: June 10, 1931 by Benjamin Joseph Keiley

Personal details
- Born: October 12, 1879 Athlone, County Westmeath, Ireland
- Died: May 16, 1947 (aged 67) Baltimore, Maryland, US
- Denomination: Roman Catholic Church
- Education: Mungret College; Royal University of Ireland; Urban College of the Propaganda
- Motto: Quis ut Deus? (Who is like unto God)

Styles of Michael Curley
- Reference style: His Excellency; The Most Reverend
- Spoken style: Your Excellency
- Religious style: Archbishop

Michael Joseph Curley (October 12, 1879 – May 16, 1947) was an Irish-born American Catholic prelate who served as the first archbishop of Washington in the District of Columbia from 1939 to 1947. He also served as Archbishop of Baltimore in Maryland (1921–1947) and previously as bishop of St. Augustine in Florida (1914–1921).

Curley was known for his militancy in protecting the rights of Catholics and of his dioceses against perceived and real attacks from outside forces. As bishop of St. Augustine, he fought anti-Catholic efforts by the State of Florida and the Jesuits to claim what he felt was his rightful authority.

As archbishop of Baltimore and later Washington, he denounced the oppression of Catholic clergy in Mexico and Spain and of Jews in Germany. Curley is also known for his strong program of school construction in the Archdiocese of Baltimore.

== Biography ==
=== Early life and education ===
One of eleven children, Michael Curley was born on October 12, 1879, in Goldenisland Athlone, County Westmeath, Ireland to Michael and Maria (née Ward) Curley. He attended a primary school in Athlone that was run by the Marist Brothers. At age 16, Curley entered Mungret College in Limerick, Ireland. While at Mungret, Curley wanted to eventually become a missionary to the Fiji Islands. However, after speaking with Bishop John Moore during a school visit, Curley decided instead to go to the Diocese of St. Augustine in the United States after he finished his education.

After graduating from Mungret, Curley entered the Royal University of Ireland, earning a Bachelor of Arts in 1900. He then travelled to Rome to study at the Urban College of the Propaganda, receiving a Licentiate of Sacred Theology in 1903. His ordination was postponed until 1904 due to stress.

=== Priesthood ===
On March 19, 1904, Curley was ordained to the priesthood for the Diocese of Saint Augustine by Cardinal Pietro Respighi in the Basilica of St. John Lateran in Rome. He arrived in Florida in 1904, and was named pastor of St. Peter's Parish in DeLand, Florida. He lived in a rented room above a store and ate in a local diner. In 1914, Bishop William Kenny appointed Curley as chancellor of the diocese and as his personal secretary.

=== Bishop of Saint Augustine ===
On April 3, 1914, Pope Pius X appointed Curley as the fourth bishop of St. Augustine. He received his episcopal consecration at the Cathedral of Saint Augustine on June 30, 1914, from Bishop Benjamin Keiley, with Bishops Patrick Donahue and Owen Corrigan serving as co-consecrators. At age 34, Curley was the youngest bishop in the country — indeed 20 years later he was still the second youngest. He spent eight months out of every year on journeys throughout the diocese.

In 1913, the Florida Legislature passed legislation prohibiting white women from teaching African-American children in schools. At that time, the diocese had white nuns teaching in four schools for African-Americans in St. Augustine, Fernandina, Jacksonville, and Ybor City. Considering the law unconstitutional, the bishop at the time, William Kenny, told the sisters to ignore it. In a 1915 letter to the parishes in the diocese, Curley wrote:

We Catholics of the United States are victims of organized vilification and the government itself [through the mails] takes a hand by the distribution of lewd and lascivious anti-Catholic filth. It is high time for the sixteen million Catholics of the United States to assert their rights and claim that protection which their citizenship and demonstrated loyalty should guarantee them.”

On April 24, 1916, Florida Governor Park Trammell ordered the arrest of three Sisters of St. Joseph for violating the law. When one of the sisters refused to post bond, she was put under house arrest at her convent. Curley vigorously attacked the sisters' arrests, portraying them as a state-sponsored campaign against Catholic schools in Florida. He gained strong support from other Catholic prelates in the United States. Curley attracted national attention in 1917 by battling a bill in the Florida Legislature mandating state inspections of convents. Curley refused to comply with it. He led a successful legal campaign to have the law declared unconstitutional. He also sought to educate Floridians about Catholicism and demonstrate the bigotry of the Ku Klux Klan.

After the American entry into World War I in 1917, Curley provided strong support of the American war effort. That same year, he established the diocesan Catholic War Council, a group that gave spiritual guidance to Florida's Catholic soldiers. He spoke at Liberty Bond rallies. At the end of the war, Curley celebrated a large memorial mass for soldiers who died in the war at Battery Park in New York City.

In 1919, Curley appealed to Bishop Giovanni Bonzano, apostolic delegate to the United States, to end an agreement between the diocese and the Society of Jesus. In 1889, Bishop John Moore had asked the Jesuits to build Catholic missions and churches in Southwest Florida from Tampa Bay to Key West. Curley wanted them to surrender control of the area, along with Jesuit property, to the diocese. In 1921, the Vatican approved an agreement that gave the diocese jurisdiction over the region, but allowed the Jesuits to keep their property.

By the end of his tenure as bishop of St. Augustine, the Catholic population in the diocese had grown from 39,000 to 41,000, with 40 new churches built.

=== Archbishop of Baltimore ===
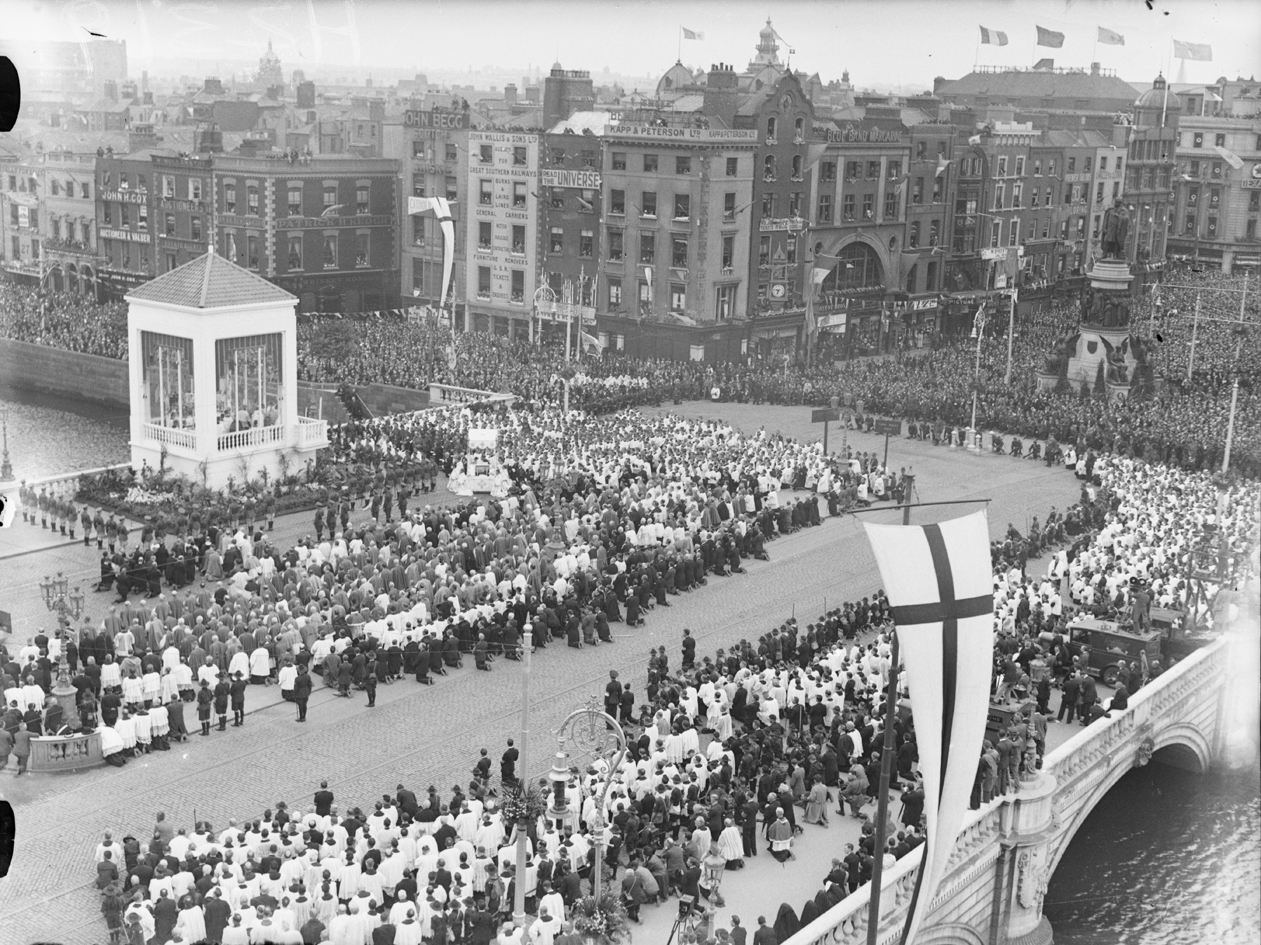
Closing ceremony, 1932 Eucharistic Congress, Dublin, Ireland

On August 10, 1921, Pope Benedict XV named Curley as the tenth archbishop of Baltimore. His installation took place on November 30, 1921. His arrival in his new city was described as "one of the greatest welcomes ever tendered a new citizen of Baltimore." During his tenure in Baltimore, Curley spent $30 million building 66 schools in 18 years, placing the importance of constructing schools over churches. In 1926, he declared,

"I defy any system of grammar school education in the United States to prove itself superior to the system that is being maintained in the Archdiocese of Baltimore."

Curley also established archdiocesan offices for Catholic Charities (1923) and for the Society for the Propagation of the Faith (1925). In 1922, in an article published in the Gaelic American during the Irish Civil War, Curley criticized the Irish politician Éamon de Valera for causing violence in Ireland, comparing him to the Mexican revolutionary Pancho Villa. In March 1926, Curley criticized the expropriation of Catholic Church property by the Mexican Government and the expulsion of foreign priests and nuns from Mexico:

In order to preach the doctrine of Jesus Christ in Mexico, one must be a Mexican by birth. If the Savior of the world came back to Mexico, he would be exiled forthwith...because he is not a born Mexican.

In the mid-1920s, many clergy became concerned about the spiritual well-being of the large number of Catholic students attending non-Catholic colleges. This prompted the establishment of the Newman Club movement, Catholic centers at these institutions. However, Curley denounced the movement, believing that Catholic youth belonged in Catholic universities only. He made these remarks in 1925:

The men backing the so-called Catholic Foundation Plan are waging a secret hypocritical warfare against the best interests of the Church in America. They are honest. They remind us of the Modernists who were bent on destroying the Church from within. The latter attacked the Church's teachings. The Foundationists attack the Church's right to educate. In fact, they pose as friends of the Church when they tell her to throw her millions of children into an atmosphere of destructive secularism in order that they may be educated.

In 1931, Pope Pius XI appointed Curley as an assistant to the papal throne; he was later named a member of the College of Patriarchs and Bishops. Curley celebrated the mass at the end of the 1932 Eucharistic Congress in Dublin. Combative by nature, Curley exemplified the militancy of many American bishops and archbishops during the 1920s and 1930s:

- Condemning the foreign policy of US President Franklin Roosevelt
- Protesting the anti-Semitic policies of Nazi Germany in 1933
- Criticizing the American film industry in 1934 for producing what he called filthy films. He vigorously fought efforts in Baltimore to open movie theaters on Sunday.
- Calling upon American bishops to conduct a study of the influences of communism in the United States.
- Terming policies of the Second Spanish Republic in 1939 as anti-clerical, blaming it for the deaths of hundreds of Spanish priests and nuns.

In 1934, an article in The Baltimore Sun compared the ruthlessness of German Chancellor Adolf Hitler to the Catholic theologian Ignatius of Loyola. After receiving complaints from several Jesuit priests, the Sun printed an apology. Unhappy over what he perceived as slights by the Sun, Curley demanded a fuller apology and threatened a subscriber boycott. While Curley was visiting Ireland, the Sun worked out a quiet settlement with the archdiocese.

=== Archbishop of Baltimore and Washington ===
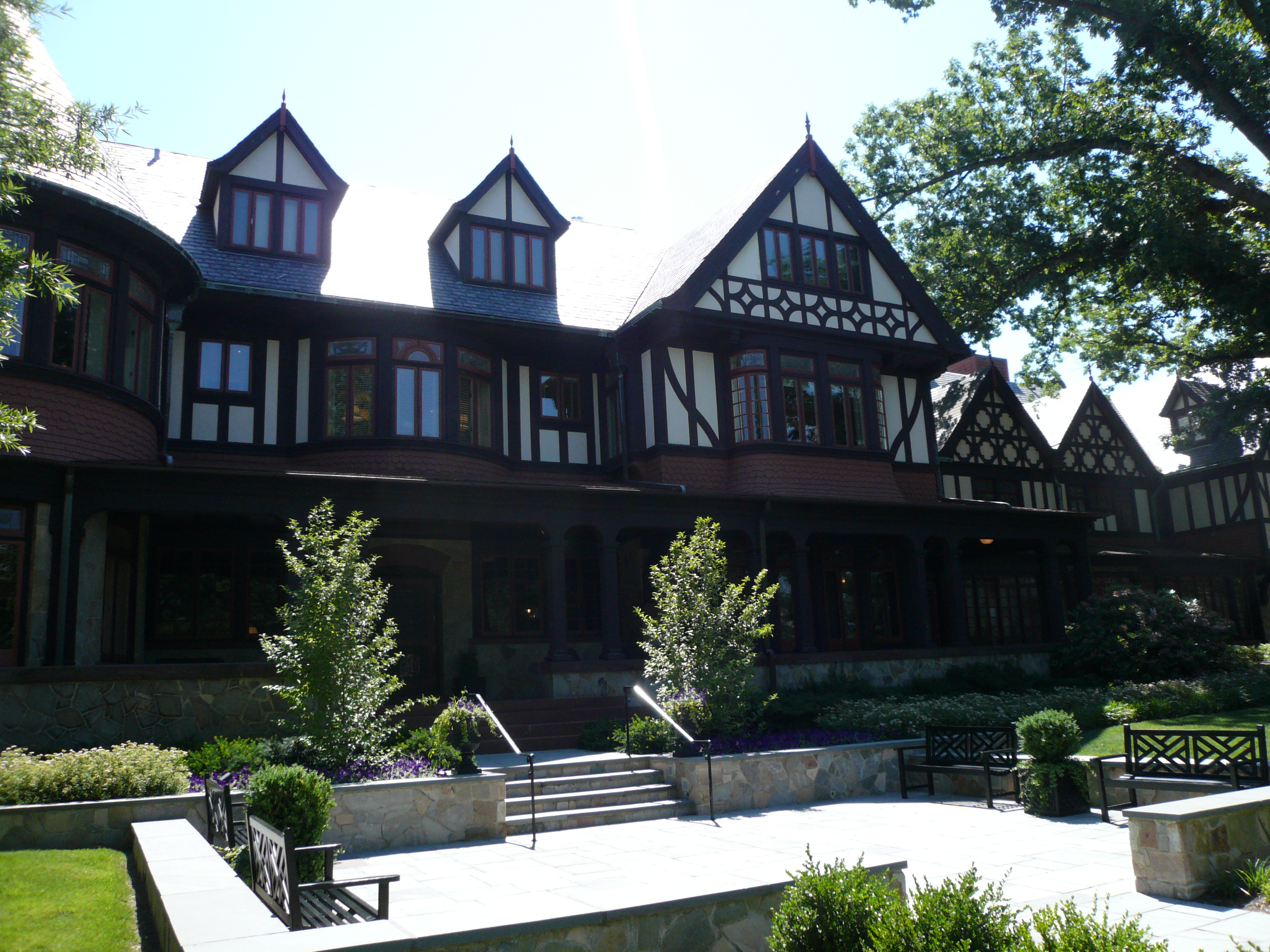
Loyola University Maryland, Baltimore, Maryland (2008)

On July 22, 1939, Pope Pius XII separated Washington, D.C., from the Archdiocese of Baltimore to form the new Archdiocese of Washington. While allowing Curley to retain his position as archbishop of Baltimore, the pope appointed him as the first archbishop of Washington. He governed the two archdioceses as a single unit.

In March 1941, Curley sued Loyola College in Baltimore and its president, Reverend Edward Bunn, over a bequest in a will. In 1937, Frances Stuart, a Catholic philanthropist, had written a will naming the archdiocese as a beneficiary. When Bunn arrived in Baltimore in 1938, he became a spiritual counselor to Stuart. In January 1940, in declining health, she revised her will, using a lawyer suggested by Bunn. In the new will, Stuart added Loyola College as a beneficiary and dropped the archdiocese. She died a few days later. In early 1940, Bunn tried to negotiate a lawsuit settlement with Curley, but he refused it. In February 1941, Curley demanded Bunn's firing as part of a settlement. In May 1941, a jury ruled that Stuart's second will was valid.

In December 1941, Curley made an inappropriate remark to a reporter about the Japanese attack on Pearl Harbor on December 7. His opponents in the Catholic hierarchy persuaded the apostolic delegate to the United States, Bishop Amleto Giovanni Cicognani, to reprimand him. From then on, Curley avoided any political comments. Although his predecessor in Baltimore, Archbishop James Gibbons, was appointed cardinal, Curley never received the same distinction.

=== Death and legacy ===
By 1943, after an operation for a detached retina, Curley had given up his public appearances. Curley suffered from sinusitis, shingles, and high blood pressure. A series of strokes caused him to have partial paralysis and blindness.

Curley died at Bon Secours Hospital in Baltimore from a stroke on May 16, 1947, at age 67. He is interred in the Basilica of the National Shrine of the Assumption of the Blessed Virgin Mary in Baltimore. After Curley's death, Pius XII appointed separate archbishops for Baltimore (Bishop Francis Keough) and Washington (Bishop Patrick O'Boyle).

Archbishop Curley High School in Baltimore, founded in 1960, was named after Curley.

== See also ==
- Catholic Church hierarchy
- Catholic Church in the United States
- Historical list of the Catholic bishops of the United States
- List of Catholic bishops of the United States
- Lists of patriarchs, archbishops, and bishops

Catholic Church titles
Preceded by William John Kenny	Bishop of St. Augustine; 1914–1921	Succeeded by Patrick Joseph Barry
Preceded by James Gibbons	Archbishop of Baltimore; 1921–1947	Succeeded by Francis Patrick Keough
New title	Archbishop of Washington; 1939–1947	Succeeded by Patrick O'Boyle
