= Curley Court =

- Location within the District of Columbia

General information
- Type: Dormitory
- Location: 620 Michigan Ave., N.E. Washington, DC 20064; United States
- Coordinates: 38.9380°N 77.0088°W
- Completed: 1998
- Renovated: 2007

Curley Court was a dormitory for 98 upper-class students at The Catholic University of America, Washington, DC, United States. Constructed in 1998 and named for the university's former chancellor, Cardinal Michael Curley, it was renovated in 2007. Curley Court consisted of 24 occupied mobile homes with one additional trailer serving as a laundry facility. Curley Court was last occupied by students in the Fall 2014 semester and removed beginning in the Spring 2015. New construction and reconfigured parking will replace Curley Court.

It was deconstructed in 2015.
