= Verot =

Verot may refer to:

- Alternate name for Bastardo (grape)
- Augustin Verot (1804–1876), French-born American Roman Catholic bishop
- Darcy Verot (born 1976), Canadian ice hockey player
