= Diocese of St. Augustine =

Latin Catholic ecclesiastical jurisdiction in Florida, USA

Coordinates: 29°53′39″N 81°18′48″W

Diocese of St. Augustine Dioecesis Sancti Augustini Diócesis de San Agustín
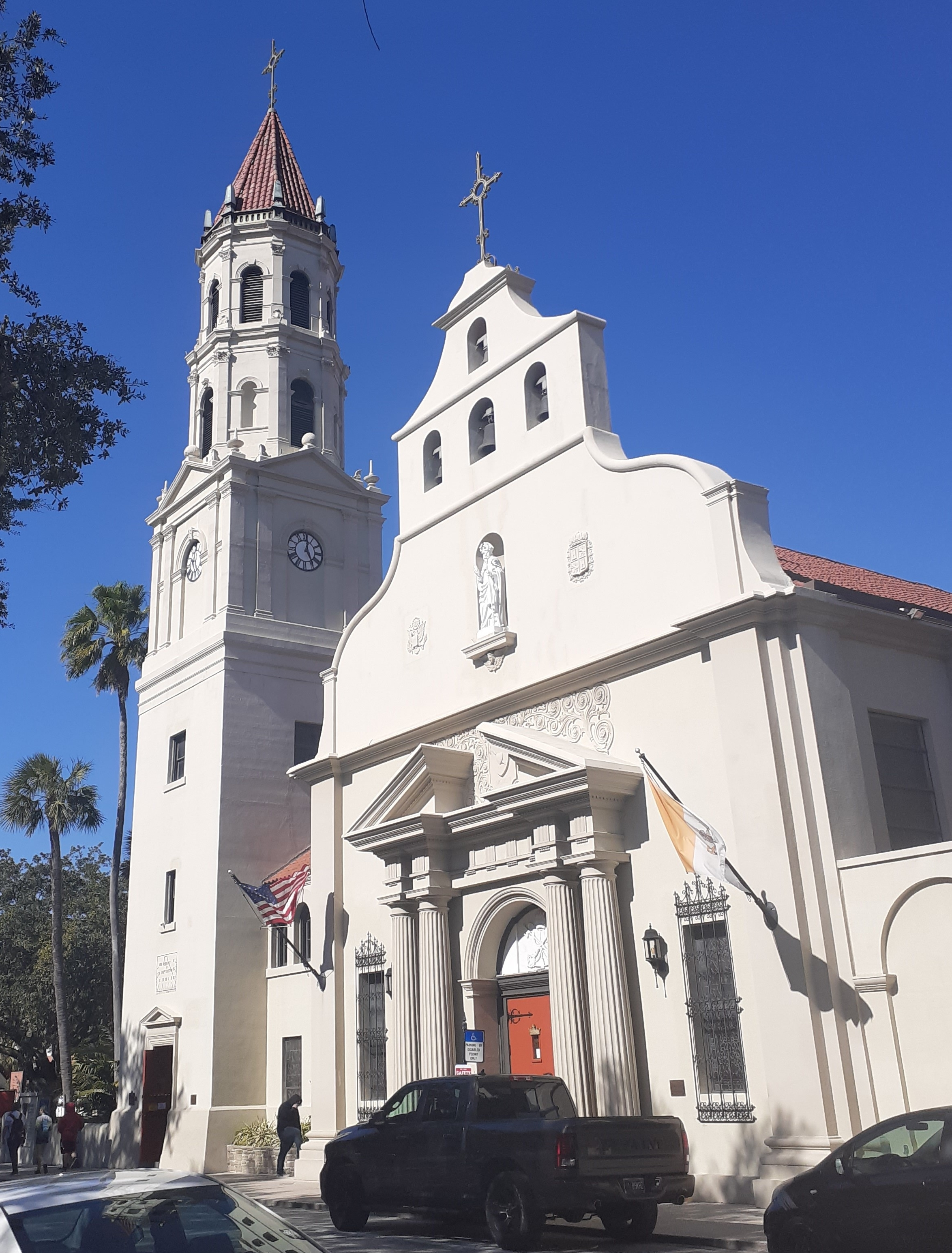
- Cathedral-Basilica of St. Augustine

- Coat of arms

Location
- Country: United States
- Territory: 17 counties in northeastern Florida: Alachua Baker Bradford Clay Columbia Dixie Duval Flagler Gilchrist Hamilton Lafayette Levy Nassau Putnam St. Johns Suwannee Union
- Ecclesiastical province: Province of Miami

Statistics
- Population: Total; Catholics: (as of 2022); 2,330,405; 153,041 (4.5%)
- Parishes: 54
- Schools: 29

Information
- Denomination: Catholic
- Sui iuris church: Latin Church
- Rite: Roman Rite
- Established: March 11, 1870
- Cathedral: Cathedral-Basilica of St. Augustine
- Patron saint: St. Augustine

Current leadership
- Pope: Leo XIV
- Bishop: Erik T. Pohlmeier
- Metropolitan Archbishop: Thomas Wenski
- Bishops emeritus: Felipe de Jesús Estévez

Map
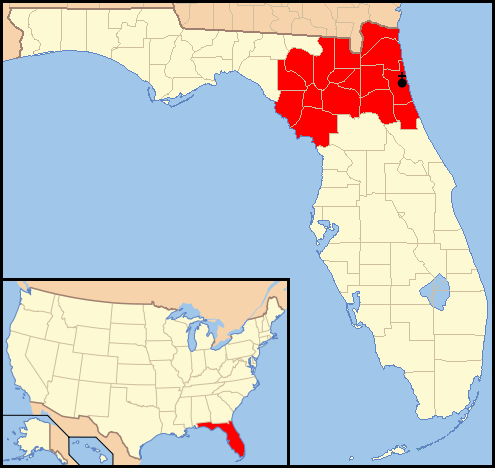

Website
- www.dosafl.com

The Diocese of St. Augustine (Latin: Dioecesis Sancti Augustini) is a Roman Catholic diocese located in the northeastern section of Florida in the United States. It includes the cities of St. Augustine, Jacksonville, and Gainesville. Erected in 1870, it is a suffragan diocese of Miami, covering much of North Florida. The bishop's seat is the Cathedral Basilica of St. Augustine. The bishop is Erik T. Pohlmeier.

== History ==
=== Background ===
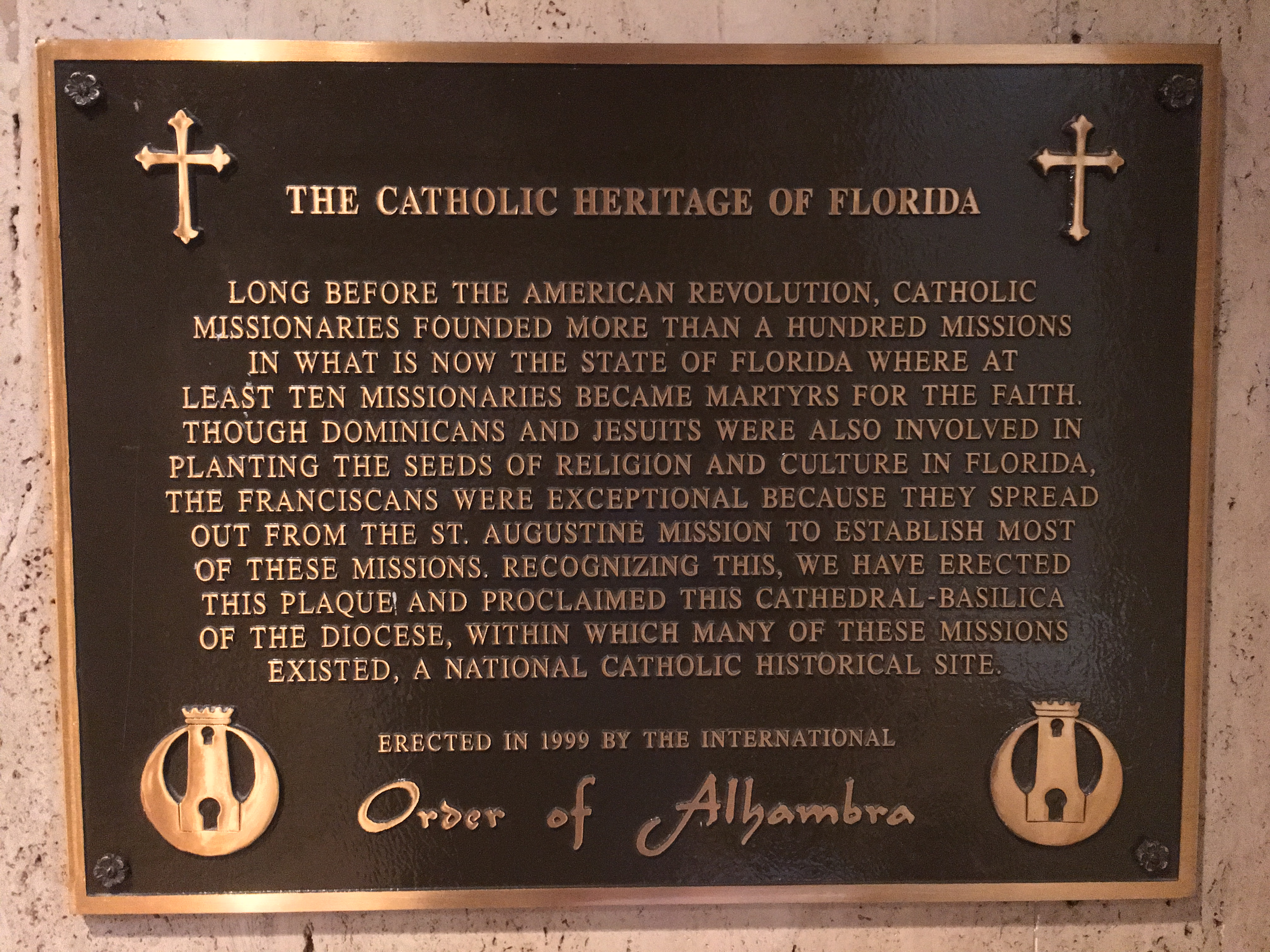
Catholic Heritage of Florida Plaque in Cathedral-Basilica (2016)

In 1571, Spanish Jesuit missionaries made a brief, unsuccessful trip to Northern Florida. Two years later, in 1573, several Spanish Franciscan missionaries arrived in present day St. Augustine. They established the Mission Nombre de Dios in 1587 at a village of the Timucuan people. By 1606, Florida was under the jurisdiction of the Diocese of Santiago de Cuba (until 1787, later of the Diocese of Havana in Cuba).

By the early 1700's, the Spanish Franciscans had established a network of 40 missions in Northern and Central Florida, with 70 priests ministering to over 25,000 Native American converts. However, raids by British settlers and their Creek Native American allies from the Carolinas eventually shut down the missions. Part of the reason for the raids was that the Spanish colonists gave refuge to enslaved people who had escaped the Carolinas. A number of Timucuan Catholic converts in Northern Florida were slaughtered during these incursions.

After the end of the French and Indian War in 1763, Spain ceded all of Florida to Great Britain for the return of Cuba. Given the antagonism of Protestant Great Britain to Catholicism, the majority of the Catholic population in Florida fled to Cuba. After the American Revolution, Spain regained control of Florida in 1784. In 1793, the Vatican changed the jurisdiction for Florida Catholics from Havana to the Diocese of Louisiana and the Two Floridas, based in New Orleans. but, after of the Louisiana purchase (1803), in 1806 Florida returned to the Diocese of Havana (until 1823). In the Adams–Onís Treaty of 1819, Spain ceded all of Florida to the United States, which established the Florida Territory in 1821.

In 1825, Pope Leo XII erected the Vicariate of Alabama and Florida, which included all of Florida, based in Mobile, Alabama. In 1850, Pope Pius IX erected the Diocese of Savannah, which included Georgia and all of Florida east of the Apalachicola River.

=== Establishment as vicariate ===
In 1858, Pius IX moved Florida into a new Apostolic Vicariate of Florida and named Bishop Augustin Verot as vicar apostolic. Since the new vicariate had only three priests, Vérot travelled to France in 1859 to recruit more. He succeeded in bringing back seven priests. Three Christian Brothers from Canada opened a boys' school in St. Augustine.

During the American Civil War, Vérot condemned the looting of the Catholic church at Amelia Island, Florida, by Union Army troops. He personally evacuated several Sisters of Mercy from Jacksonville to Savannah through the battle zone in Georgia. After the war, Vérot published a pastoral letter urging Catholics in the diocese to "put away all prejudice ... against their former servants". In 1866, the Sisters of St. Joseph were introduced from France, and despite the most adverse conditions, they had several flourishing schools and academies in operation before many years.

=== Elevation to diocese ===
Bishop Moore (pre-1914)

On March 11, 1870, Pius IX elevated the Vicariate of Florida into the Diocese of St. Augustine and named Vérot as its first bishop. The new diocese covered all of Florida except for the Florida Panhandle region. Vérot died in 1876. In 1877, John Moore became the second bishop of St. Augustine.

In 1887, a yellow fever outbreak in Florida killed several priests in the diocese. That same year, a fire destroyed the Cathedral of St. Augustine. At Moore's request, a group of Jesuit fathers arrived in Tampa, Florida, in 1888 to replace the priests lost to illness. In August 1888, the St. Mary's Home for Orphan Girls was opened in Jacksonville, Florida. That same year, yellow fever broke out again in Jacksonville. With the local priest William J. Kenny sidelined by the disease, Moore rushed there to run the parish and tend to the sick. Moore died in 1901.

=== Early 20th century ===
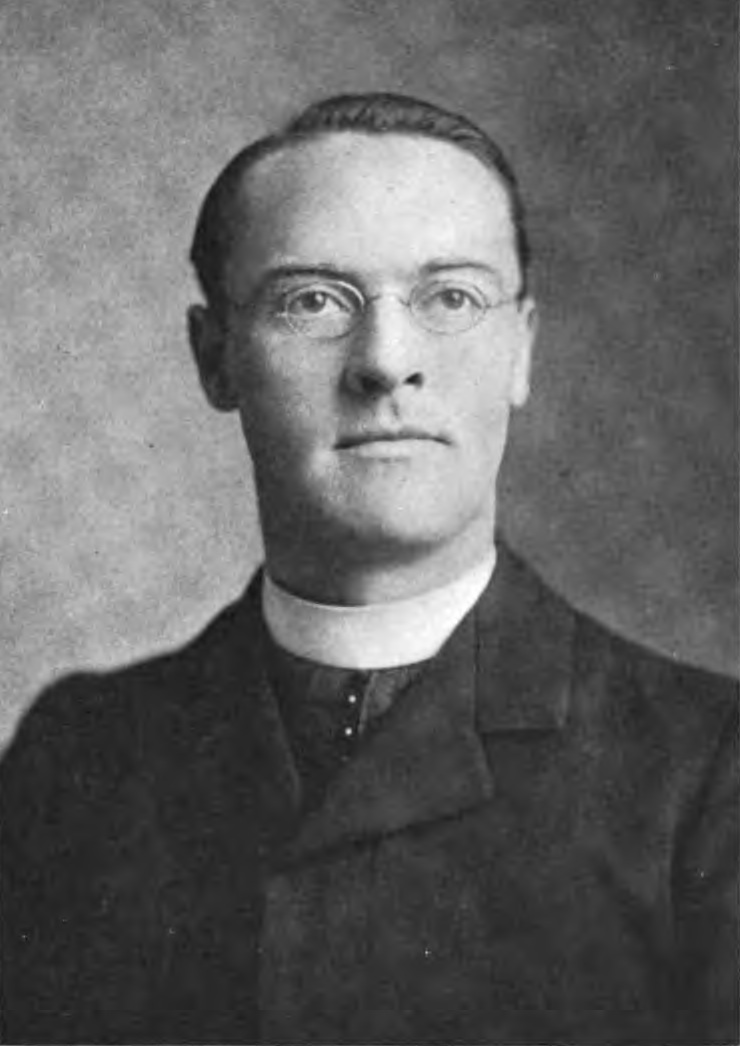
Bishop Curley (pre-1914)

In 1902, Monsignor William Kenny was appointed as the third bishop of the Diocese of St. Augustine by Pope Leo XIII. During his tenure as bishop, Kenny increased the recruitment of Irish priests and nuns, reorganized diocesan offices, expanded missionary efforts to Florida's interior and smaller towns, and more than doubled diocesan fundraising. He also established the first Catholic parish for African Americans in the state. In 1913, the Florida Legislature had passed legislation prohibiting white women from teaching African-American children, a measure aimed at non-segregated Catholic schools. Considering the law unconstitutional, Kenny told his teaching nuns to ignore it. Kenny died in 1913.

The next bishop of St. Augustine was Michael Curley, nominated in 1914. In 1916, Florida Governor Park Trammell ordered the arrest of three Sisters of St. Joseph for violating the law on teaching African-American children. Curley vigorously protested againt the arrests, identifying them as part of a campaign against Catholic schools.

Curley attracted national attention again in 1917 by successfully battling a bill in the Florida Legislature that would have mandated inspections of convents. Curley refused to comply with it. He led a successful legal campaign to have the law declared unconstitutional. He also sought to educate Floridians about Catholicism and demonstrate the bigotry of the Ku Klux Klan. By the end of his tenure, the Catholic population of the diocese had grown from 39,000 to 41,000, with 40 new churches built. In 1921, Pope Benedict XV named Curley as the new archbishop of the Archdiocese of Baltimore.

In 1922, Monsignor Patrick Barry was appointed the fifth bishop of St. Augustine by Pope Pius XI. In 1931, Barry instituted an annual pilgrimage to the shrine of Nuestra Señora de la Leche at the Mission Nombre de Dios in order to draw attention to the heritage of the Catholic Church in St. Augustine. In 1940, Barry founded Barry University in Miami Shores along with his family members. Barry died in 1940 after 18 years in office.

=== Late 20th century and reduction of territory ===
Pius XII named Monsignor Joseph Hurley of the Diocese of Cleveland as the next bishop of St. Augustine. In 1958, Pius XII erected the Diocese of Miami, taking its territory in South Florida from the Diocese of Augustine. Hurley was a staunch opponent of the American Civil Rights actions during the 1960s, even avoiding Martin Luther King Jr. at the airport when their paths crossed unexpectedly. King would eventually write Hurley a letter requesting his support for the movement, but failed to gain it. Hurley died in 1967.

Bishop Paul Tanner, general secretary of the National Catholic Welfare Conference, was the next bishop of St. Augustine, selected by Pope Paul VI in 1968. That same year, the pope erected the Dioceses of Orlando and St. Petersburg, both taking territory from the Diocese of St. Augustine. In 1975, Paul VI erected the Diocese of Pensacola-Tallahassee, taking more territory from St. Augustine. Tanner retired in 1979. His replacement was Auxiliary Bishop John J. Snyder from the Diocese of Brooklyn, named by Pope John Paul II that same year. Snyder entered retirement in 2000.

=== 21st century ===
In 2001, John Paul II appointed Monsignor Victor Galeone of the Archdiocese of Baltimore as bishop of St. Augustine. Galeone retired in 2011 and Pope Benedict XVI replaced him with Auxiliary Bishop Felipe de Jesús Estévez of Miami.

Estévez initiated the first ecumenical vespers at the bishop-level in Florida in 2014 at the Cathedral Basilica of St. Augustine. The service was attended by Protestant and Orthodox leaders, clergy and lay people. He attended the installation of Bishop Robert Schaefer of the Evangelical Lutheran Church in America near Tampa, Florida. He collaborated with local Eastern Orthodox Christian leaders in support of the meeting between Pope Francis and Patriarch Bartholomew in Jerusalem in 2014. In 2019, Estévez announced that the Shrine of Our Lady of La Leche, located in the Nombre de Dios mission, had been designated by the US Conference of Catholic Bishops as a national shrine. Estévez retired in 2022.

The current bishop of the Diocese of St. Augustine is Bishop Erik T. Pohlmeier from the Diocese of Little Rock, appointed by Pope Francis in 2022

=== Sex abuse ===
In 2003, a woman who had first accused the priest William Malone in 1991 repeated her allegations to Bishop Galeone. He never submitted the accusation to the diocesan review board, nor contacted the local district attorney. She returned to the diocese in 2018 with the same accusations. This time, the review board looked at the allegations and deemed them credible. After Malone was publicly listed with credible accusations, three more women in 2019 accused him of sexual abuse.

In March 2020, the diocese removed John H. Dux from ministry after determining that sex abuse allegations against him from 1976 were credible. His accuser, Patrick Colville, said that Dux abused him when he was a minor, in 1976.

In November 2020, the state of Florida released a list of 97 Catholic priests who were "credibly accused" of committing sex abuse, with five accused of committing sex abuse while serving in the diocese. A total of 13 priests on the statewide list were connected to the diocese.

== Coat of arms ==
Coat of arms of Diocese of St. Augustine
Escutcheon Quarterly gules and argent, over all a heart in fess point transfixed with an arrow bendways or Symbolism Based on the arms of Castile and León and with a symbol of St. Augustine.

== Bishops ==
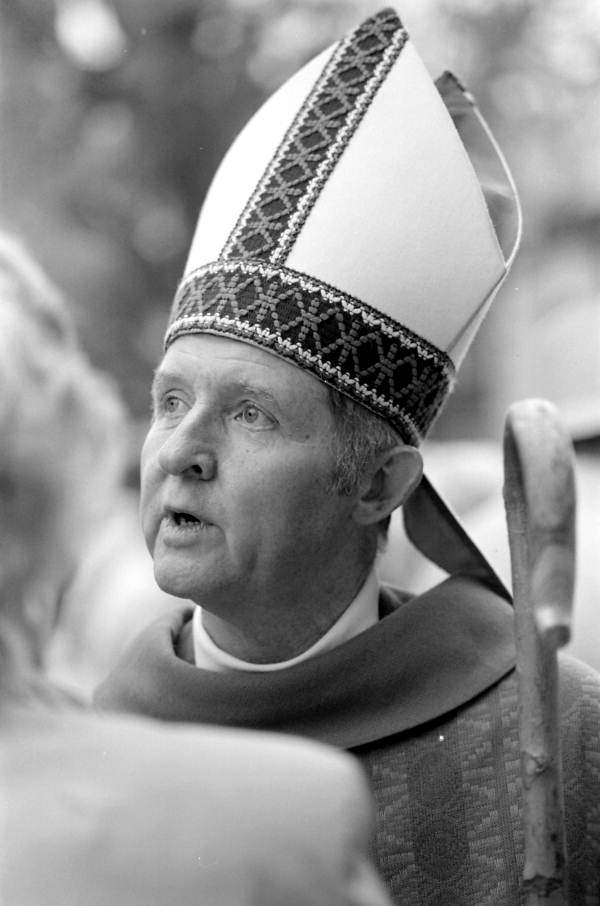
Bishop Snyder (1983)

=== Bishops of Saint Augustine ===
1. Augustin Verot, P.S.S. (1870–1876)
2. John Moore (1877–1901)
3. William John Kenny (1902–1913)
4. Michael Joseph Curley (1914–1921), appointed Archbishop of Baltimore-Washington
5. Patrick Joseph Barry (1922–1940)
6. Joseph Patrick Hurley (1940–1967), Archbishop (personal title) in 1949
7. Paul Francis Tanner (1968–1979)
8. John J. Snyder (1979–2000)
9. Victor Galeone (2001–2011)
10. Felipe de Jesús Estévez (2011–2022)
11. Erik T. Pohlmeier (2022–present)

=== Auxiliary bishop ===
- Thomas Joseph McDonough (1947–1957), appointed Auxiliary Bishop of Savannah and later Bishop of Savannah and Archbishop of Louisville

=== Other diocesan priests who became bishops ===
- Maurice Patrick Foley, appointed Bishop of Tuguegarao in the Philippines in 1910
- William Turner, appointed Bishop of Buffalo in 1919
- John Joseph Fitzpatrick (priest here, 1948–1958), appointed Auxiliary Bishop of Miami in 1968 and later Bishop of Brownsville
- William Thomas Larkin, appointed Bishop of Saint Petersburg in 1979
- Joseph Keith Symons, appointed Auxiliary Bishop of Saint Petersburg in 1981
- Robert Joseph Baker, appointed Bishop of Charleston in 1999 and later Bishop of Birmingham
- Thanh Thai Nguyen, appointed Auxiliary Bishop of Orange in 2017

== Education ==
=== High schools ===
- Bishop John J. Snyder High School – Jacksonville
- Bishop Kenny High School – Jacksonville
- Morning Star High School – Jacksonville
- Saint Francis Catholic Academy – Gainesville
- St. Joseph Academy – St. Augustine

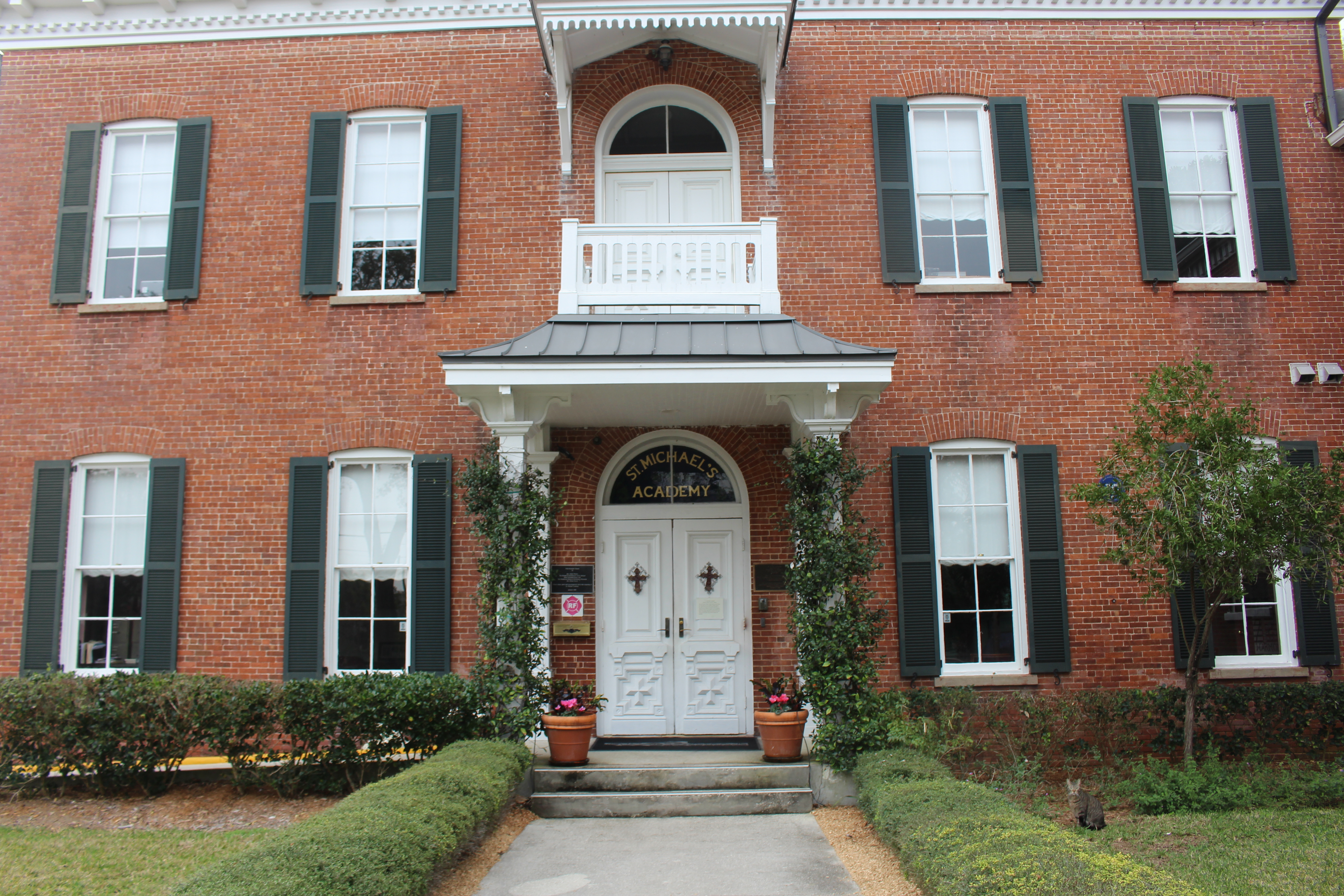
St. Michael Academy – Fernandina Beach

== Parishes ==
There are 54 active parishes in the Diocese of St. Augustine.

=== Basilicas ===
- Basilica of the Immaculate Conception - Pope Francis raised Immaculate Conception in Jacksonville to a Minor Basilica in 2013.
- Cathedral Basilica of St. Augustine (St. Augustine, Florida) - Originally established in 1565 and re-built in the 18th century, it is the oldest church in Florida. Pope Paul VI raised the Cathedral of St. Augustine to a Minor Basilica in 1976.

== Coat of arms ==
Coat of arms of Diocese of St. Augustine
Notes Arms was designed and adopted when the diocese was erected Adopted 1870 Escutcheon The diocesan coats of arms has a background of red (gules) and silver (argent) quarters. It displays a flaming heart pierced by a gold arrow. Symbolism The red and silver background represent the fields of Castile and Leon in Spain. The flaming heart pierced by the gold arrow is the traditional emblem of Augustine of Hippo, symbolizing his quotation from Confessions, Chapter 1: "Our hearts shall ever restless be, until they find their rest in Thee."
