= Augustin Vérot =

American Catholic prelate

The Right Reverend Augustin Vérot PSS
- Bishop of St. Augustine
- Church: Catholic Church
- Diocese: St. Augustine
- Appointed: March 11, 1870
- Term ended: June 10, 1876
- Predecessor: Office established
- Successor: John Moore
- Previous posts: Vicar Apostolic of Florida (1858–1870); Bishop of Savannah (1861–1870)

Orders
- Ordination: September 20, 1828 by Hyacinthe-Louis de Quélen
- Consecration: April 25, 1858 by Francis Kenrick

Personal details
- Born: May 23, 1805 Le Puy-en-Velay, Haute-Loire, France
- Died: June 10, 1876 (aged 71) St. Augustine, Florida, U.S.
- Motto: Fide et virtute (Latin for 'By faith and virtue')

Jean Marcel Pierre Auguste Vérot PSS (May 23, 1805 – June 10, 1876) was a French-born American prelate of the Catholic Church. He was a longtime Catholic leader of Florida, serving first as vicar apostolic of the state (1858–1861) and later as bishop of St. Augustine (1870–1876). He also served as bishop of Savannah in Georgia (1861–1870).

== Early life and education ==
Augustin Vérot was born on May 23, 1805, in Le Puy-en-Velay, in the Haute-Loire department of south-central France. He was the son of Pierre Vérot, a lace dealer, and his wife, Madeleine Verot (née Marcet).

Vérot received his early education at the Basilian-run Collège du Sacré-Cœur in Annonay, graduating in 1821. He then entered Saint-Sulpice Seminary in Issy-les-Moulineaux, where he completed his studies for the priesthood. Among his fellow seminarians were Félix Dupanloup and Jean-Baptiste Henri Lacordaire.

== Priesthood ==
Vérot was ordained a priest on September 20, 1828, by Archbishop Hyacinthe-Louis de Quélen. Shortly afterwards, he joined the Society of the Priests of Saint Sulpice, also known as the Sulpicians. In 1830, the Sulpician superior general sent Vérot to teach at St. Mary's College in Baltimore, Maryland.

At St. Mary's, Vérot served as professor of mathematics, astronomy, and chemistry. One of his students, Aloysius Leo Knott, later wrote that Vérot "had what I have never observed in any other teacher of mathematics, the faculty of interesting while initiating his students into the abstruse studies they pursued under his direction."

Following the closure of the college in 1852, Vérot became pastor of St. Paul Church in Ellicott City. He also did pastoral work among the enslaved people at the nearby Doughoregan Manor, the ancestral home of Charles Carroll. Future bishop William Hickley Gross, then a student at St. Charles College, later recalled, "Bishop Verot edified us all by his assiduous care of the many slaves belonging to the Carroll family, whose estates adjoined the college grounds."

== Vicar Apostolic of Florida ==
On December 11, 1857, Vérot was appointed the first vicar apostolic of Florida by Pope Pius IX, along with the honorary position of titular bishop of Danaba. The pope had initially selected Father Francis Patrick McFarland for the position, but he declined the appointment.

Vérot received his episcopal consecration on April 25, 1858, from Archbishop Francis Kenrick at the Baltimore Cathedral, with Bishops John McGill and John Barry serving as co-consecrators.

At the beginning of Vérot's tenure, the newly established vicariate covered the entire state of Florida and included three priests, two churches, and seven mission chapels. In 1859, he traveled to France, where he recruited six priests, four religious brothers, and two nuns to come to Florida. Later that year, he also recruited five Sisters of Mercy from Connecticut and three Christian Brothers from Canada to open girls' and boys' schools.

== Bishop of Savannah ==
On July 23, 1861, Vérot was appointed the third bishop of Savannah by Pius IX. In addition to his new duties in Georgia, he remained apostolic administrator of the Florida vicariate.

At the time, the Diocese of Savannah covered the entire state of Georgia, including ten churches and chapels, seven schools, and about 8,000 Catholics. By the end of Vérot’s tenure, the diocese had nine churches, 30 chapels and stations, 11 schools, and a Catholic population of about 20,000.

=== Civil War ===
Vérot's tenure in Savannah largely coincided with the Civil War (1861–1865), during which he supported the Confederacy and the institution of slavery. Vérot criticized the personal liberty laws enacted by Northern states in response to the Fugitive Slave Act of 1850, writing, "These enactments of state legislatures against the law of Congress constituted a true rebellion, which was, however, unchecked, either by armies or by blockades. This was tearing the social compact." While he acknowledged "the many privations, sufferings and calamities entailed upon us by the war," he believed the war was necessary for "the preservation of our just liberties and legitimate possessions." In the summer of 1862, he ordered Te Deum (a hymn of thanksgiving) to be sung at Catholic churches in Georgia and Florida for Confederate victories.

In March 1865, following the siege of Savannah, Union troops began constructing a defense line through a Catholic cemetery, destroying large sections and disinterring bodies. Vérot expressed his outrage to Secretary of War Edwin Stanton, writing, "I thought I could not do less than send my humble protest in behalf of the Catholic Church, whose right[s] and privileges I deem to be infringed by this proceeding; in behalf of an outraged community obliged now to carry away where they can the moldering remains of their relatives and friends; in behalf of the Irish-Catholic soldiers, who are obliged to perform the work of hyenas, and in behalf of those who will have to stand in the midst of exhalations arising from opened and mutilated graves." Stanton had Major General James Allen Hardie reply to Vérot, criticizing "the disrespectful and unbecoming language of your letters towards the Govt. and its officers." Vérot successfully demanded that the U.S. government restore the cemetery, reinterring the bodies in December 1866.

Despite his Confederate sympathies, Vérot and his priests were the only clergy of any denomination who ministered to Union prisoners of war, including at the Andersonville Prison. Recounting his experience at Andersonville, Vérot wrote, "The number of those who died was dreadful. Within the space of about two hours and without my advancing more than twenty paces into the enclosure, I personally confessed and anointed nine dying men, and I stopped only at the most urgent cases." In late 1865, he ministered to Samuel Mudd, a Catholic doctor accused of conspiring with John Wilkes Booth to assassinate Abraham Lincoln, while he was imprisoned at Fort Jefferson in Dry Tortugas. Mudd later wrote that Vérot was "a most saintly man, plain and unassuming as an old fiddlestick."

Following the end of the war, Vérot went on a fundraising tour in Northern states to collect money for repairing churches under his charge. In 1867, he opened a Catholic school for Black children in Savannah and recruited Sisters of St. Joseph from his native Le Puy-en-Velay to run it. He subsequently established more schools for Black children in Jacksonville (1868) and Fernandina (1870), as well as Palatka, Mandarin, and Key West.

=== First Vatican Council ===
Vérot participated in the First Vatican Council (1869–1870), first as bishop of Savannah and then as bishop of St. Augustine. He was opposed to the definition of papal infallibility, the most important issue before the council. In January 1870, he joined 20 other American bishops in unsuccessfully petitioning Pius IX to withdraw the infallibility decree, believing the debate would show lack of unity among the bishops and hurt relations with non-Catholics. The council held a preliminary vote on the decree on July 13, 1870. Vérot and 87 other bishops voted no, 451 voted yes, and 62 voted yes with conditions. Ahead of the scheduled final vote on July 18, many opponents of infallibility received permission to leave the council rather than offend the pope with their vote. Vérot left Rome on July 19, but still declared his formal adherence to the new dogma.

Beyond the issue of papal infallibility, Vérot argued for "the rehabilitation of Galileo in the name of science." He also sought a declaration upholding the humanity of Black people, condemning "the inept error" that "Negroes do not belong to the human family, or that they are not endowed with spiritual and immortal souls." Neither proposal was accepted by the council.

Vérot's comments at the council were often met with laughter and derision by his fellow bishops. At one point, in response to the reaction to his words, he said, "It is easier to laugh than to answer." Due to his outspoken role in the proceedings, Father Léon Dehon, who served as stenographer at the council, described Vérot as "an enfant terrible." Furthermore, Bishop James Alipius Goold noted in his personal diary that Vérot "had outraged the patience of all."

== Bishop of St. Augustine ==
In April 1869, the bishops at the tenth Provincial Council of Baltimore recommended elevating the Vicariate Apostolic of Florida into a diocese. On March 11, 1870, during the First Vatican Council, Pope Pius IX established the Diocese of St. Augustine and named Vérot as its first bishop.

As bishop, Vérot renovated the Cathedral of St. Augustine, restored the Chapel of Our Lady of La Leche, and dedicated many new churches in honor of the martyrs of La Florida. He also promoted Florida as a health and cultural resort.

== Death and legacy ==
After returning from a visitation of his diocese, Vérot died at St. Augustine on June 10, 1876, at age 71. For many years, it was incorrectly rumored that his remains had exploded during his Requiem Mass.

Vérot was buried at Tolomato Cemetery, in a vault alongside the remains of Félix Varela. In 1911, the vault was reopened to return Varela's remains to his native Cuba. However, doubts arose as to whether Varela's or Vérot's remains had been removed. In 1975, Bishop Paul Francis Tanner authorized the authentication of Verot's remains. In 1988, the bishop's remains were reinterred in a new location at Tolomato Cemetery.

Bishop Vérot High School, a private Catholic institution in Fort Myers, Florida, was named for Vérot in 1964.

== Views ==
=== Slavery ===
On January 4, 1861, a day designated for prayer by President James Buchanan ahead of the Civil War, Vérot delivered a sermon on slavery at St. Augustine. In his sermon, Vérot defended the religious and legal basis of slavery, saying it had "received the sanction of God, of the Church, and of society at all times, and in all governments." However, consistent with the 1839 In supremo apostolatus of Pope Gregory XVI, he condemned the Atlantic slave trade, saying, "What right has any man to steal another man and enslave him? This, next to murder, seems to be the grossest violation of justice that can be conceived."

Vérot also laid out the conditions under which he believed slavery was lawful. These conditions included: the slaveowner’s repudiation of the slave trade; respect for the rights of free people of color; avoiding the sexual exploitation of enslaved and free Black women; allowing enslaved people to marry and not separating married couples; providing adequate food, clothing, and shelter to enslaved people; and allowing enslaved people to practice religion.

His sermon was soon printed and widely circulated under the title A Tract for the Times: Slavery and Abolitionism. Vérot subsequently became known as the Rebel Bishop by many in the North. Archbishop Francis Kenrick of Baltimore sought to have the tract suppressed, and an official of the Congregation for the Propagation of the Faith noted: "It would seem that one cannot accept everything which is affirmed in this argument."

In October 1865, following the end of slavery in the United States, Vérot addressed a pastoral letter to the people of Georgia and Florida, writing

Peace has come to you, not with the perpetuation, but with the abolition of slavery. You have lost your servants. But let me ask you: had you complied faithfully with the obligation incumbent on you to give a truly Christian education and instruction to those servants...as it was your duty to do so? This obligation is now shifted from your hands into those of the servants themselves. Many will therefore find an enormous reduction in the account they will have to render to their God, at the bar of the divine justice. Is this not a just cause of joy and congratulation?

In another pastoral letter in August 1866, Vérot wrote about the necessity of "giving to that race admitted to the boon of freedom the opportunity of obtaining instruction and knowledge," allowing "the colored race to be admitted and invited to the benefits of Catholic schools and Catholic education." He concluded:

Hence we wish in all sincerity and with great earnestness, all kinds of blessings to the colored race, and we exhort all to put away all prejudice, all dislike, all antipathy, all bitterness against their former servants. Away with all feelings of bickerings, envy or jealousy which would only bespeak a narrow mind and the lack of noble and elevated feelings. The golden rule, love thy neighbor as thyself, must not admit of any exceptions...

=== Syllabus of Errors ===
In 1864, Pope Pius IX published the Syllabus of Errors, which condemned such things as freedom of religion and freedom of the press. Vérot disagreed with both of those particular points, saying "the Government of America ought not to make any discrimination [against religion]" and describing freedom of the press as one of the "cherished ideas of this Republic."

During the proceedings of the First Vatican Council, Vérot told the assembled bishops:

Now let me say that about twenty years ago there was a commotion in our America, a very vehement and acrimonious commotion against Catholics, and many of our churches were burned. It is my opinion, I may say, that if we are saddled with the obligation of promulgating the Syllabus, then that will be a sign of widespread conflagration, and all our churches will be burned.

=== Papal infallibility ===
Vérot strongly disagreed with the concept of papal infallibility at the First Vatican Council. Addressing his fellow bishops in May 1870, he declared "that we do not have here the most essential condition for defining any question; we do not have that constant tradition of the Church which would be required for defining papal infallibility." When Cardinal Annibale Capalti ordered him to leave the ambo, Vérot persisted, declaring, "I conclude that pontifical infallibility is not an apostolic tradition, but an opinion introduced by a piety and a zeal not based on knowledge. Therefore for me to give my vote for it would be a sacrilege—yes, a sacrilege."

Vérot also proposed the following decree to the Council Fathers: "If any man say that the pope has such plenary authority in the Church that he can dispose all things at his will, let him be accursed." This prompted Cardinal Capalti to stand up and say, "We are not in a theatre to hear buffooneries, but in the Church of the Living God to deal with important affairs of the Church; and nothing should be said in this discussion that is contumelious or foolish or erroneous."

== See also ==
- Catholic Church hierarchy
- Catholic Church in the United States
- Historical list of the Catholic bishops of the United States
- List of Catholic bishops of the United States
- Lists of patriarchs, archbishops, and bishops

== Sources ==
- Gannon, Michael V. (1964). Rebel Bishop: The Life and Era of Augustin Verot. Milwaukee: Bruce Publishing Company.

== Episcopal succession ==
Catholic Church titles
Preceded by None	Bishop of St. Augustine; 1857–1876	Succeeded by John Moore
Preceded by John Barry	Bishop of Savannah; 1861–1870	Succeeded by Ignatius Persico
