= John Moore (bishop of St. Augustine) =

Irish-born prelate

His Excellency, The Right Reverend John Moore
- Bishop of St. Augustine
- See: Diocese of St. Augustine
- In office: May 13, 1877 - July 30, 1901
- Predecessor: Augustin Verot
- Successor: William John Kenny

Orders
- Ordination: April 9, 1860 by Antonio Ligi-Bussi
- Consecration: May 13, 1877 by Patrick Neeson Lynch

Personal details
- Born: June 27, 1835 Castletown, County Westmeath, Ireland
- Died: July 30, 1901 (aged 66) St. Augustine, Florida, US
- Denomination: Catholic
- Education: College of Cambrai; Congregation for the Evangelization of Peoples

John Moore (June 27, 1835 – July 30, 1901) was an Irish-born prelate of the Catholic Church who served as the second bishop of St. Augustine in Florida from 1877 to 1901.

== Biography ==
=== Early life ===
John Moore was born in Castletown, County Westmeath, in Ireland on June 27, 1835. His family immigrated to Charleston, South Carolina, when he was age 14. Moore attended the seminary in Charleston. He was sent to Europe to study at the College of Cambrai in Cambrai, France. Moore then studied theology at the College of Propaganda in Rome.

=== Priesthood ===
Moore was ordained into the priesthood by Archbishop Antonio Ligi-Bussi in Rome on April 9, 1860, for the Diocese of Charleston. After his ordination, Moore returned to Charleston to assume assignments in parishes, most prominently St. Patrick's.

=== Bishop of St. Augustine ===
On February 16, 1877, Moore was appointed by Pope Pius IX as bishop of St. Augustine. He was consecrated on May 13, 1877, by Bishop Patrick Lynch at St John the Baptist Pro-Cathedral in Charleston. At that time, the diocese covered the entire State of Florida.

A contingent of Benedictine monks arrived in San Antonio, Florida, in 1886, initially to serve German immigrants. In 1887, a yellow fever outbreak in Florida killed several priests in the diocese. That same year, a fire destroyed the Cathedral of St. Augustine. At Moore's request, a group of Jesuit fathers arrived in Tampa, Florida, in 1888 to replace the priests lost there to illness.

In August 1888, the St. Mary's Home for Orphan Girls was opened in Jacksonville, Florida. That same year, yellow fever broke out again in Jacksonville. With the local priest, Reverend William John Kenny, sidelined by the disease, Moore rushed there to run the parish and tend to the sick.

In 1889, Moore asked the Benedictines to establish several mission churches on the Florida Gulf Coast from Pasco County northward. He requested that the Jesuits cover Hillsborough County southward to Key West,

=== Death and legacy ===
During the late 1890s, Moore suffered a debilitating stroke. Moore died at his home in St. Augustine on July 30, 1901. Bishop Moore High School in Orlando, Florida, is named for him.

== Episcopal succession ==
Catholic Church titles
Preceded by Augustin Verot	Bishop of St. Augustine; 1877–1901	Succeeded by William John Kenny
