= Joseph Patrick Hurley =

American prelate

His Excellency, The Most Reverend Joseph Patrick Hurley
- Archbishop (personal title); Bishop of St. Augustine
- Church: Roman Catholic Church
- See: Diocese of St. Augustine
- In office: 1940 to 1967
- Predecessor: Patrick Joseph Barry
- Successor: Paul Francis Tanner
- Other posts: Regent ad interim to Yugoslavia; 1945 to 1949

Orders
- Ordination: May 29, 1919 by John Patrick Farrelly
- Consecration: October 6, 1940 by Luigi Maglione

Personal details
- Born: January 21, 1894 Cleveland, Ohio, US
- Died: October 30, 1967 (aged 73) Orlando, Florida, US
- Education: John Carroll University; St. Bernard's Seminary; St. Mary's Seminary
- Motto: Virtus in arduis (Virtue in hardship)

Styles of Joseph Patrick Hurley
- Reference style: The Most Reverend
- Spoken style: Your Excellency
- Religious style: Monsignor
- Posthumous style: none

Joseph Patrick Hurley (January 21, 1894 – October 30, 1967) was an American Catholic prelate who served as bishop of St. Augustine in Florida from 1940 until his death in 1967.

Hurley also served as a Vatican diplomat in Asia during the 1920s and 1930s, and as regent ad interim in Yugoslavia between 1945 and 1949. He was awarded the personal title of archbishop in 1949.

== Biography ==
=== Early life ===
Joseph Hurley was born on January 21, 1894, in Cleveland, Ohio, one of nine children of Michael and Anna (née Durkin) Hurley. His parents were both Irish immigrants; Michael was from County Mayo, and Anna from Sligo. Hurley received his early education at Holy Name School from 1901 to 1909, and then attended St. Ignatius High School in Cleveland until 1912. He was the only one among his siblings to continue his education past age 16. Hurley applied to the US Military Academy at West Point, nominated by U.S. Representative Robert J. Bulkley. However, the nomination was disallowed when the US Army discovered that Hurley was not a resident of Bulkley's 21st congressional district.

Hurley attended John Carroll University in Cleveland from 1912 to 1915. At John Carroll, he was president of the College Debating Society and the speaker at the commencement ceremony. He also played football for the Geiger Clothes Company team, earning the nickname "The Breezer." Hurley began his studies for the priesthood at St. Bernard's Seminary in Rochester, New York. He was then sent to study theology at St. Mary's Seminary in Cleveland in 1917. During his summer vacations at St. Mary's, he worked as a naval observer in Sandusky, Ohio.

=== Priesthood ===
On May 29, 1919, Hurley was ordained a priest for the Diocese of Cleveland by Bishop John Farrelly at the Cathedral of St. John the Evangelist in Cleveland. His first assignment was as an assistant pastor at St. Columba's Parish in Youngstown, Ohio, where he remained for four years. In 1923, he received an interim assignment to St. Philomena's Parish in East Cleveland, Ohio. Later that year, Hurley was appointed to Immaculate Conception Parish in Cleveland.

In 1927, Hurley accepted an offer to serve as secretary to Archbishop Edward Mooney, his former professor at St. Mary's Seminary and now apostolic delegate to India. He accompanied Mooney in 1931 to Japan when Mooney was transferred to the apostolic delegation there. Following Mooney's return to the United States as bishop of Rochester in 1933, Hurley remained in Japan to serve as chargé d'affaires of the apostolic delegation from 1933 to 1934. During this period, he helped resolve a conflict that arose between Japan and Canada. Newspapers in Kagoshima, Japan, had accused Canadian Catholic missionaries of spying on the fortified islands off Kagoshima Bay.

Hurley was named a domestic prelate by Pope Pius XI in 1934. That same year, he became the first American to serve as an official of the Vatican Secretariat of State. During his work at the Secretariat of State, he acted as a liaison between the Vatican and the American Catholic hierarchy. He played an influential role in shaping the Vatican's policy towards Reverend Charles Coughlin, a controversial Michigan priest and radio personality.

=== Bishop of St. Augustine ===
On August 16, 1940, Hurley was appointed the sixth bishop of St. Augustine by Pope Pius XII. At that time, the diocese covered the entire State of Florida. Some believed that Pius XII appointed him there so that Hurley could remain in contact with the ailing diplomat Myron Charles Taylor, the American emissary to the Vatican. Others believed the appointment was a punishment; Hurley had become a critic of the wartime policy of the Vatican, believing that Pius XII was overly fearful about communism and not fearful enough about Nazism.

Hurley received his episcopal consecration on October 6, 1940, from Cardinal Luigi Maglione, with Archbishops Celso Costantini and Clemente Micara serving as co-consecrators, at the chapel of the Pontifical Urbaniana University in Rome. Returning to the United States, Hurley was installed as bishop of St. Augustine on November 26, 1940.

==== Opposition to Nazism ====
Before the December 1941 Japanese attack on Pearl Harbor in World War II, Hurley was considered the most outspoken interventionist among the American Catholic bishops. He made enemies among isolationist Catholic clergy and laity by labeling the Nazi Party "public enemy No. 1" of the United States and the Catholic Church. He declared,

"The foe of all we love, both as Americans and as Catholics, is the Nazi. Communism is still our enemy but ... in point of urgency if not in point of teaching, communism has now ceded its primacy to national socialism."

Hurley aligned himself with the U.S. Department of State and began to act under the direction of government officials. His efforts were largely composed of black propaganda, the use of false source attributions. In a radio address in July 1941, he expressed his belief that US President Franklin D. Roosevelt alone should decide upon U.S. entry into the war, saying,

"It is up to him to safeguard the interests of the nation in times of great emergency. ...The problem [of entering the war] should be left to the Commander-in-Chief, who alone ... is capable of bringing us safely through."

These remarks drew sharp criticism from Archbishop Francis Beckman, who subsequently denounced the "dictatorship pseudo-officially canonized by a brother cleric."

After the American entry into World War II, Hurley in 1943 became the only American bishop to demand Catholics to speak out against the extermination of the Jews taking place in the Nazi concentration camps, claiming that "the very basis of the Roman Catholic faith" compelled Catholics to challenge the "orgies of extermination" being perpetrated against the Jews.Hurley described the June 1943 Allied bombing of Rome as a "tragically mistaken decision," and predicted that "much of our national unity, much of the respect we enjoy abroad now lie with San Lorenzo, in ruins." He also opposed the idea that the United States should ally with Germany to oppose the Soviet Union.

==== Service in Yugoslavia ====
In 1945, in addition to his role as bishop, Hurley was appointed by Pius XII as regent ad interim to Yugoslavia. He thus became the first American to be raised to the equivalent rank of a nuncio. Relations between the Vatican and Yugoslavia had been deteriorating following the end of the war; the new communist government had been accused of murdering priests, denouncing the Catholic Church for so-called "obstructionist" activity.

During his five years in Yugoslavia, Hurley negotiated with President Josip Tito and worked closely with U.S. officials. In 1946, he represented Pius XII at the show trial of Archbishop Aloysius Stepinac in Yugoslavia by Tito for "crimes against the people." However, Hurley's relationship with Pius XII became strained after Hurley expressed his opposition to both the Vatican's policy towards Tito and the removal of Stepinac from his post in Croatia.

==== Return to St. Augustine ====
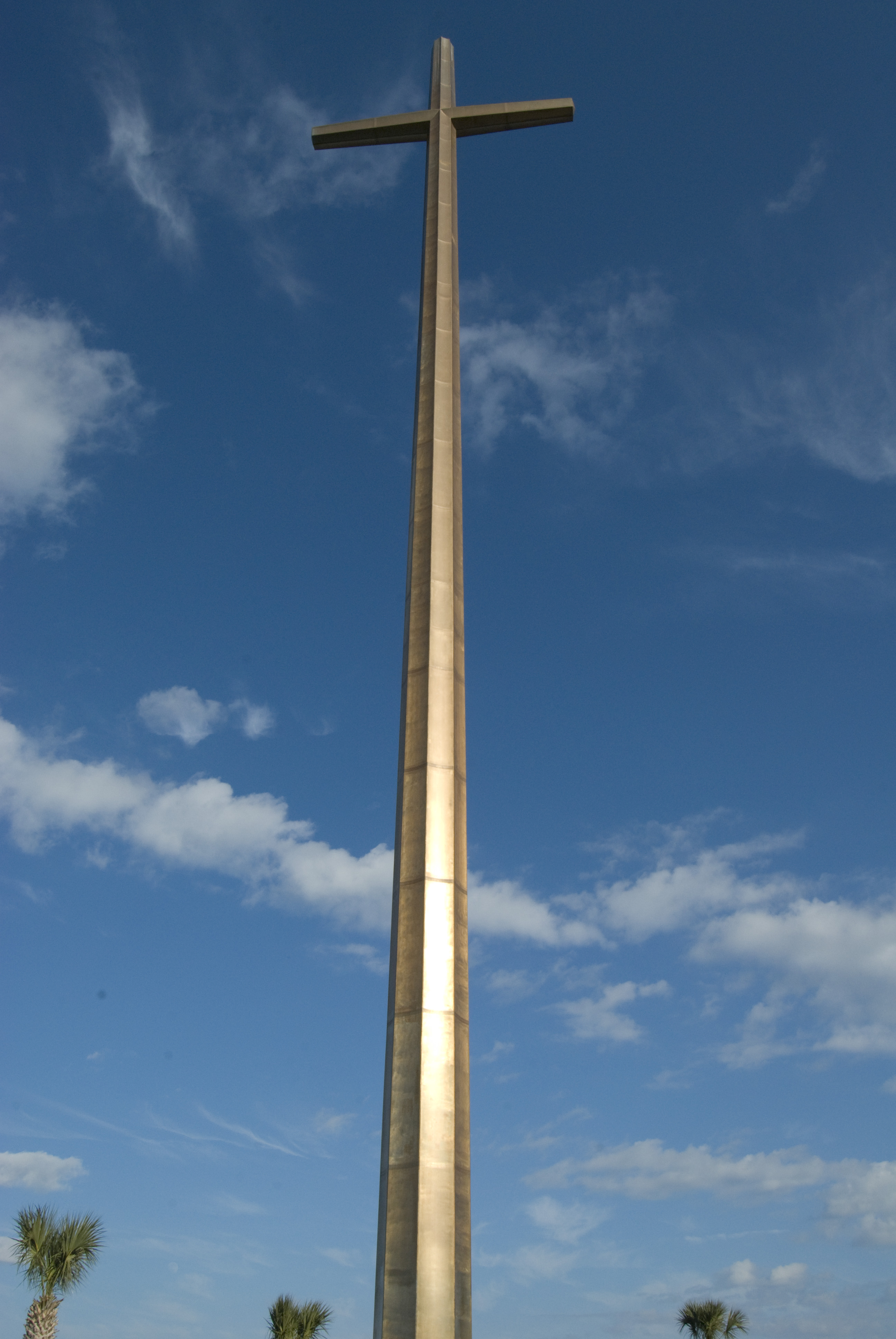
The Great Cross at the Mission Nombre de Dios, St. Augustine, Florida (2011)

Pius XII relieved Hurley of his diplomatic post in Yugoslavia and gave him the personal title of archbishop on August 14, 1949. Between 1962 and 1965, Hurley attended all four sessions of the Second Vatican Council in Rome In Florida, according to one retired priest, Hurley would fly around the state and locate property where the state was planning several new interstate highways. Hurley would buy up properties near the highways to establish future parishes.

Hurley was a staunch opponent of the American Civil Rights Movement actions during the 1960s. He avoided greeting Dr. Martin Luther King Jr. at the airport when their paths crossed unexpectedly. King would eventually write Hurley a letter requesting his support for the movement—though to no avail.

In September 1965, Hurley started the construction of the Great Cross at the Shrine of Our Lady of La Leche in St. Augustine. A 208 foot stainless steel structure, it was erected to celebrate the 400th anniversary of the founding of the Mission Nombre de Dios in that city. That same month, Hurley traveled to Rome to attend the Synod of Bishops. However, illness forced his return to Florida. In July 1966, Hurley joined St. Augustine Restoration and Preservation Commission.

=== Death ===
Joseph Hurley died at Mercy Medical Center in Orlando, Florida, on October 30, 1967, at age 73.

Catholic Church titles
Preceded by Patrick Joseph Barry	Bishop of St. Augustine; 1940–1967	Succeeded by Paul Francis Tanner
