= Cathedral Basilica of St. Augustine =

Historic church in Florida, United States

- U.S. National Register of Historic Places
- U.S. National Historic Landmark
- U.S. National Historic Landmark District – Contributing property
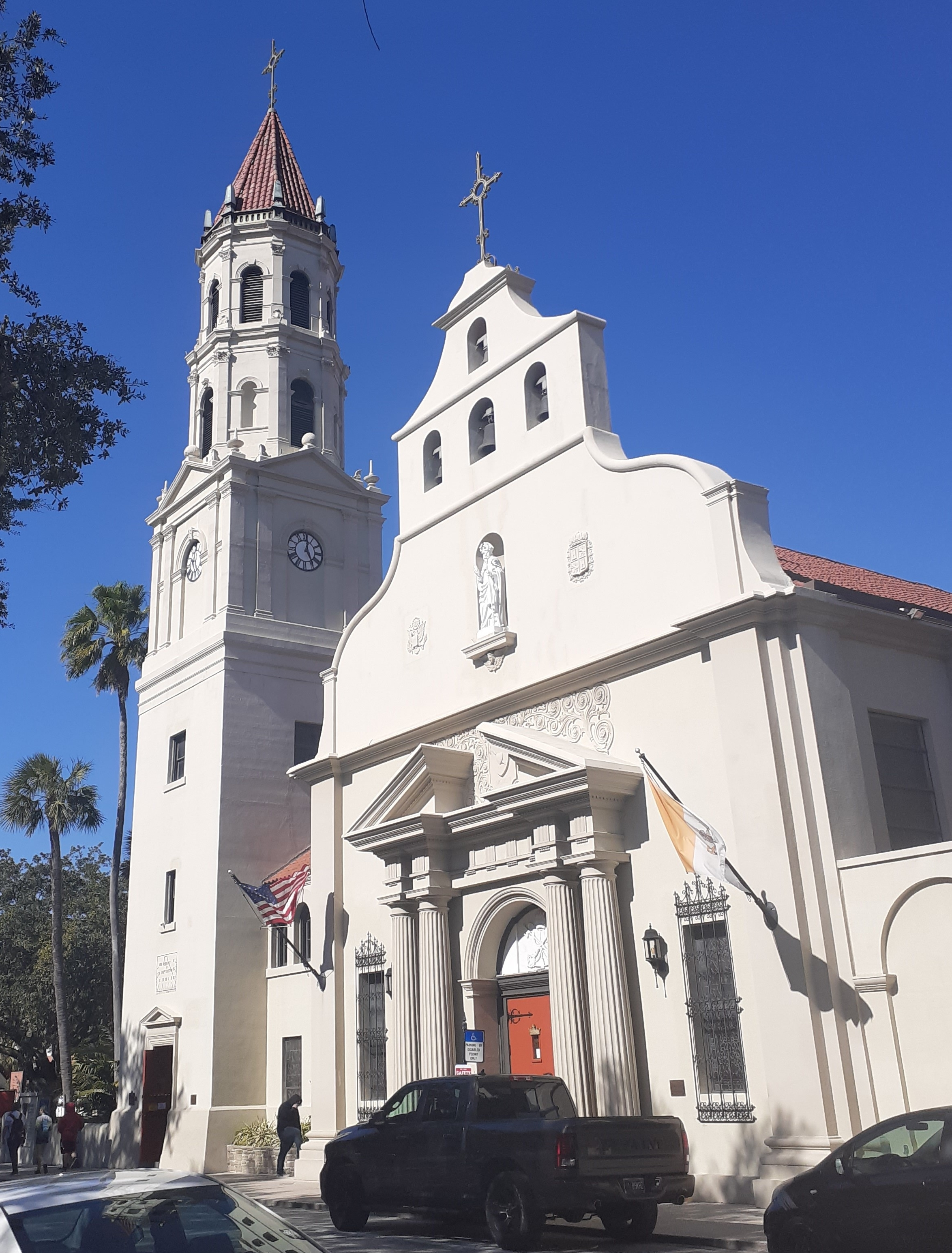

- Location within Florida Location within the United States
- Location: St. Augustine, Florida, USA
- Coordinates: 29°53′34″N 81°18′45″W
- Built: 1793–1797
- Architectural style: Spanish Colonial and Renaissance Revival
- Part of: St. Augustine Town Plan Historic District (ID70000847)
- NRHP reference No.: 70000844

Significant dates
- Added to NRHP: 15 April 1970
- Designated NHL: 15 April 1970
- Designated NHLDCP: 15 April 1970

The Cathedral Basilica of St. Augustine (Spanish: Catedral basílica de San Agustín) is a historic cathedral in St. Augustine, Florida, and the seat of the Catholic Bishop of St. Augustine. It is located at 38 Cathedral Place between Charlotte and St. George Streets. Constructed over five years (1793–1797), it was designated a U.S. National Historic Landmark on April 15, 1970. Its congregation, established in 1565, is the oldest Christian congregation in the contiguous United States. (Note: Including Puerto Rico would make the Cathedral of San Juan Bautista the oldest.)

== History ==
In the mid-1560s, as the Spanish Empire expanded northward from the Caribbean to unexplored Florida, it founded the colony of St. Augustine, which has become the oldest continuously occupied European settlement on the United States mainland. Spanish settlers immediately established a shrine of the Catholic Church, the religion essential to the Spanish monarchy throughout its history. From the mid-1500s to the mid-1600s, the kingdom of Spain was undergoing a Catholic Revival in opposition to the Protestant Reformation.

As the early colonists mainly were sailors or soldiers with little expertise in architecture, the first church of St. Augustine was of simple design and rapidly built of disparate materials. The original parish was short-lived, burning to the ground in a 1586 attack on the town by the Englishman Sir Francis Drake. Two decades previously, the colonists had hastily built a new church of straw and palmetto, which deteriorated quickly in the humid climate and burned down in 1599.

A tithe was raised in Spain, and in 1605, a third church was built, this time more permanently of timber by experienced architects and builders who had begun to make their way to the New World. For 95 years, it stayed intact, though in disrepair, before again burning down in 1702 during a failed English attempt on the city by Carolina Governor James Moore.

The church vanished for over ninety years, despite an attempt to rebuild in 1707, with royal rebuilding funds misspent on provisions, soldiers' pay, and graft by public officials. During the first half of the 18th century, priests held Mass in St. Augustine's hospital, which became too small for the congregation and embarrassed it before the Native American converts to Catholicism.

From 1763 to 1784, Florida fell under British rule, and reconstruction was forgotten. After Spain regained the colony in 1784, a new sense of pride in the citizenry led to the large-scale construction of the current church from 1793 to 1797. It became a cathedral in 1870 and a minor basilica in 1976.

== Architecture ==
The cathedral's eclectic facade is a combination of Spanish mission and Neoclassical styles. Spanish mission features include curving bell gables, limited fenestration, clay roof tiles, a semicircular tympanum, prominent statuary niche, and comparatively unadorned walls. Neoclassical details surround the entry door; an entablature embellished with triglyphs topped with a broken pediment above and supported by pairs of Doric columns below.

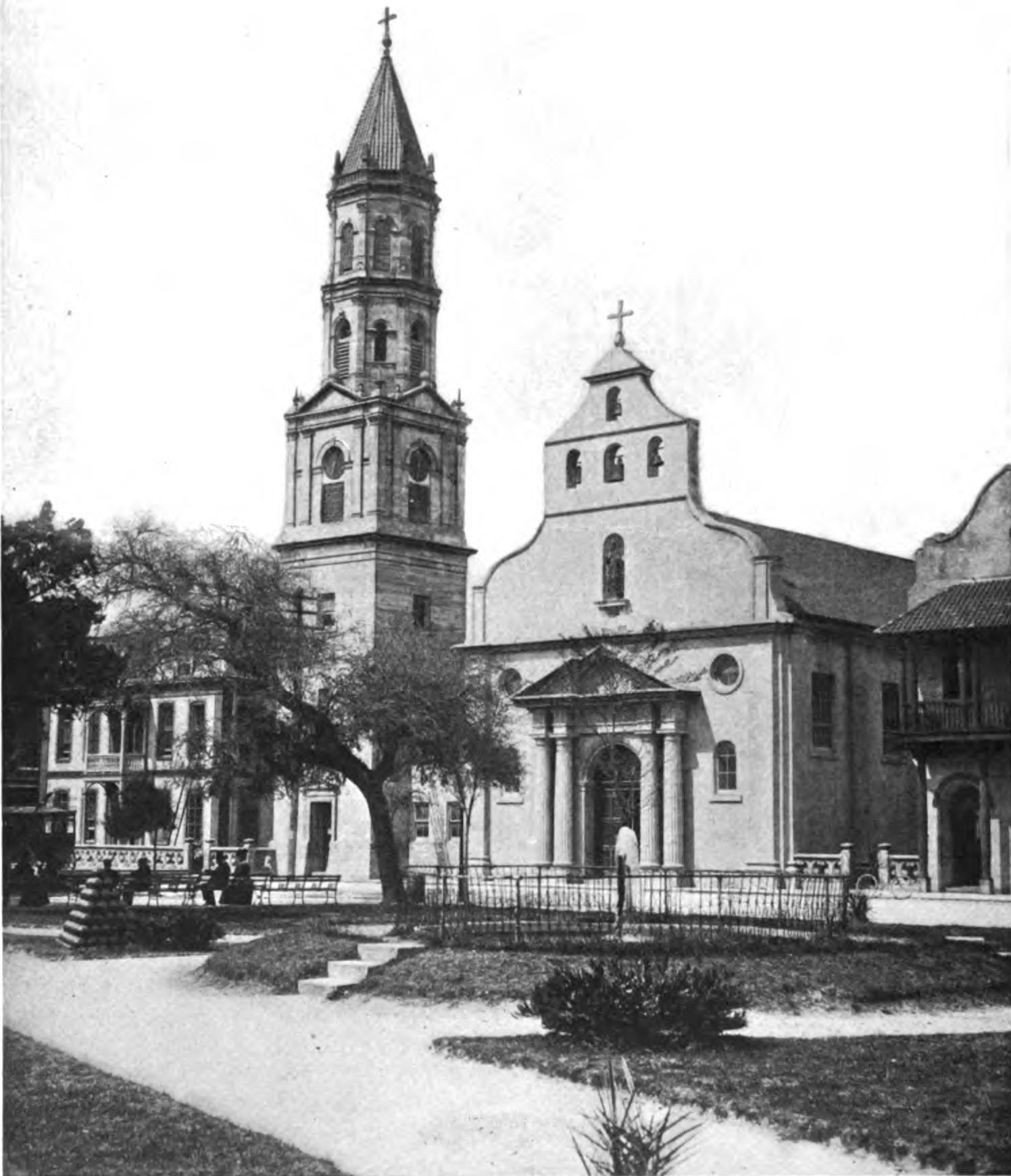
An historical image of the Basilica showing the facade with Neoclassical elements surrounding the doorway and Spanish mission styling at the gables

On April 12, 1887, with Florida, a part of the United States, the old Spanish structure burned once again, but the coquina blocks and cement masonry of the exterior were still salvageable. Reconstruction was begun with donations from Henry Flagler and funds raised in a national appeal. The congregation hired the visiting New York City architect James Renwick Jr., who rebuilt and enlarged the church with a rectangular-cruciform layout and a European-style transept.

Renwick devised an elegant roof truss system that exposed the decorated timbers, and he added a Spanish Renaissance-style bell tower, its exposed bell typical of older Spanish mission churches in the western hemisphere. Four bells were placed in the tower, one salvaged from a previous church and inscribed: "Sancte Joseph. Ora Pro Nobis. D 1682."; another taken from a British cathedral.

The coquina stone walls, which had saved the old structure from the flames, were of an unusual material inspired by Native American building techniques. Coquina is a sedimentary rock from the deposition of seashells on ancient shorelines and could be cheaply quarried and transported to the town. The wet quarry stone hardens when exposed to air, but remains soft enough to be readily worked, serving as a very convenient material. However, the new walls, including the bell tower, were made of modern cast-in-place concrete.

== Gallery ==
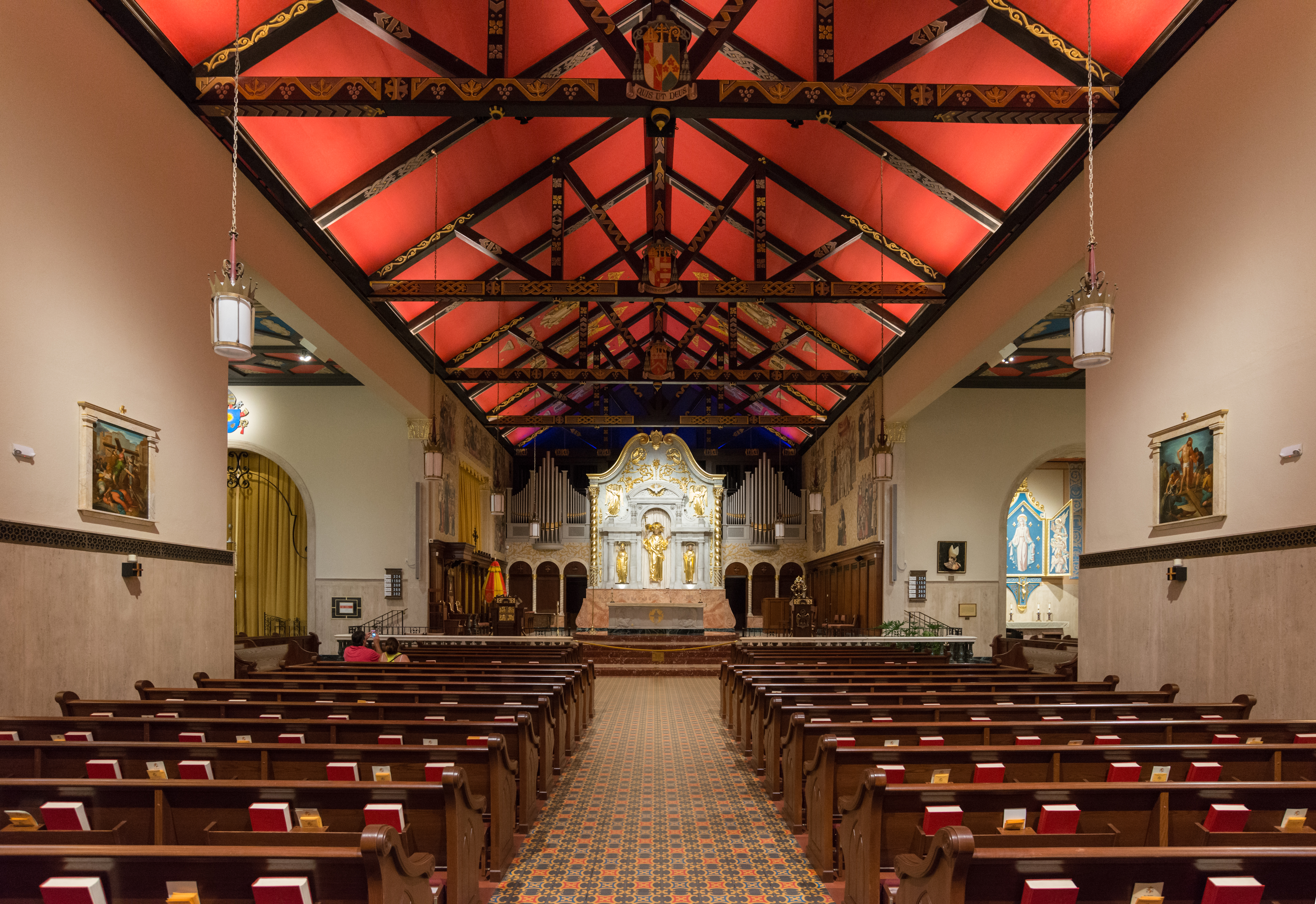
Cathedral interior

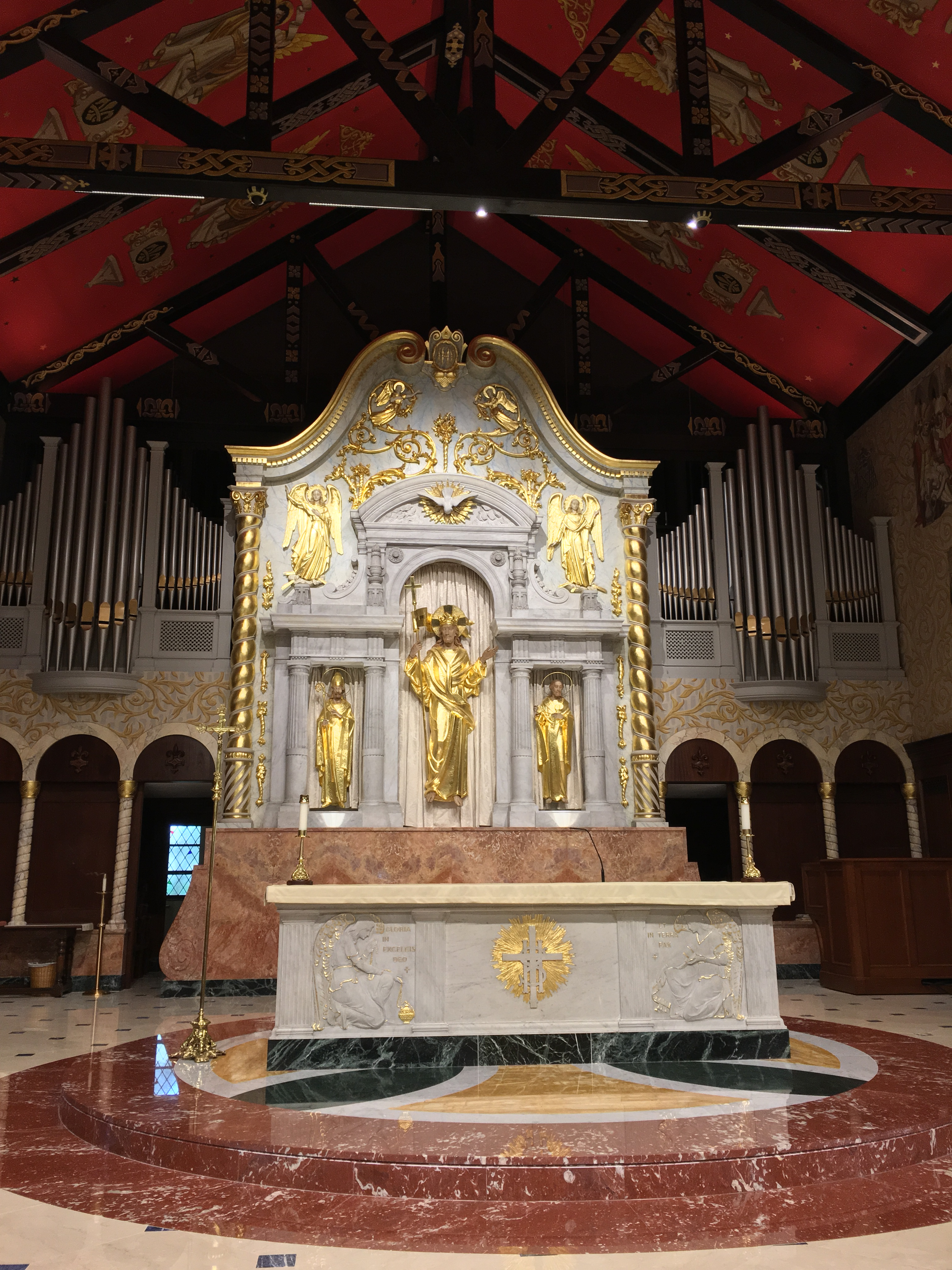
Main Altar

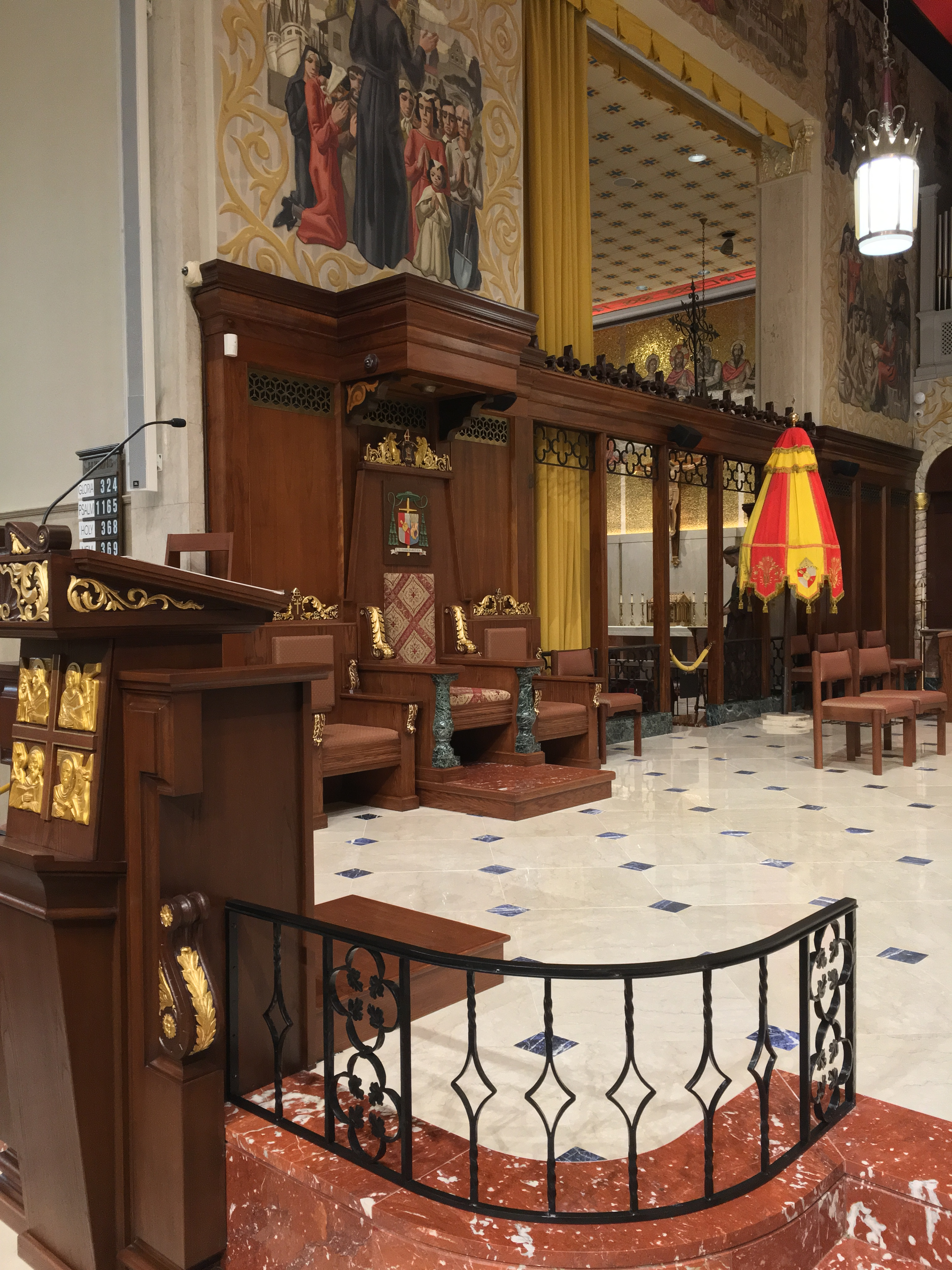
Ambo and Bishop's Cathedra, with his Coat of Arms above

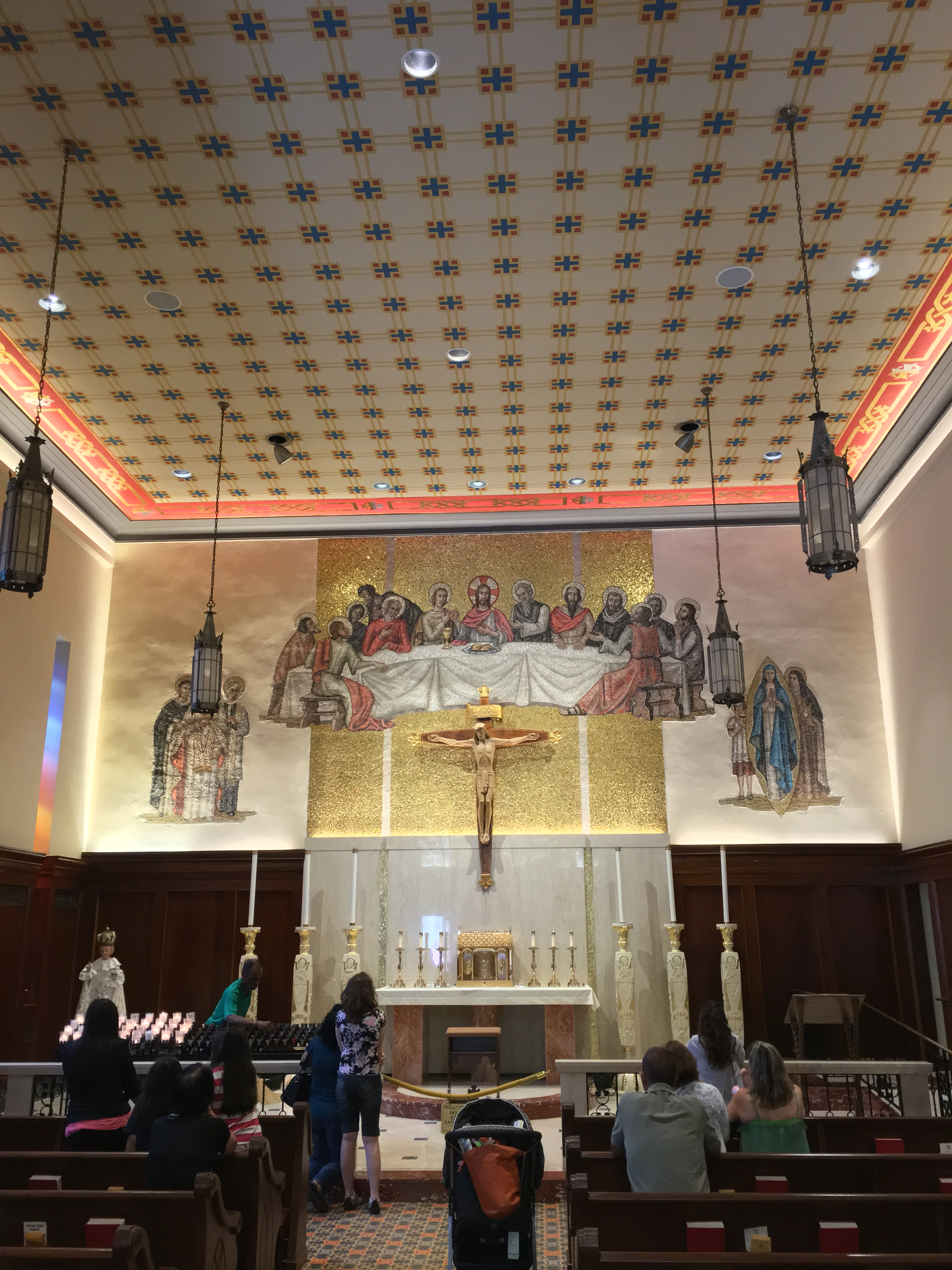
Side Chapel with mosaic

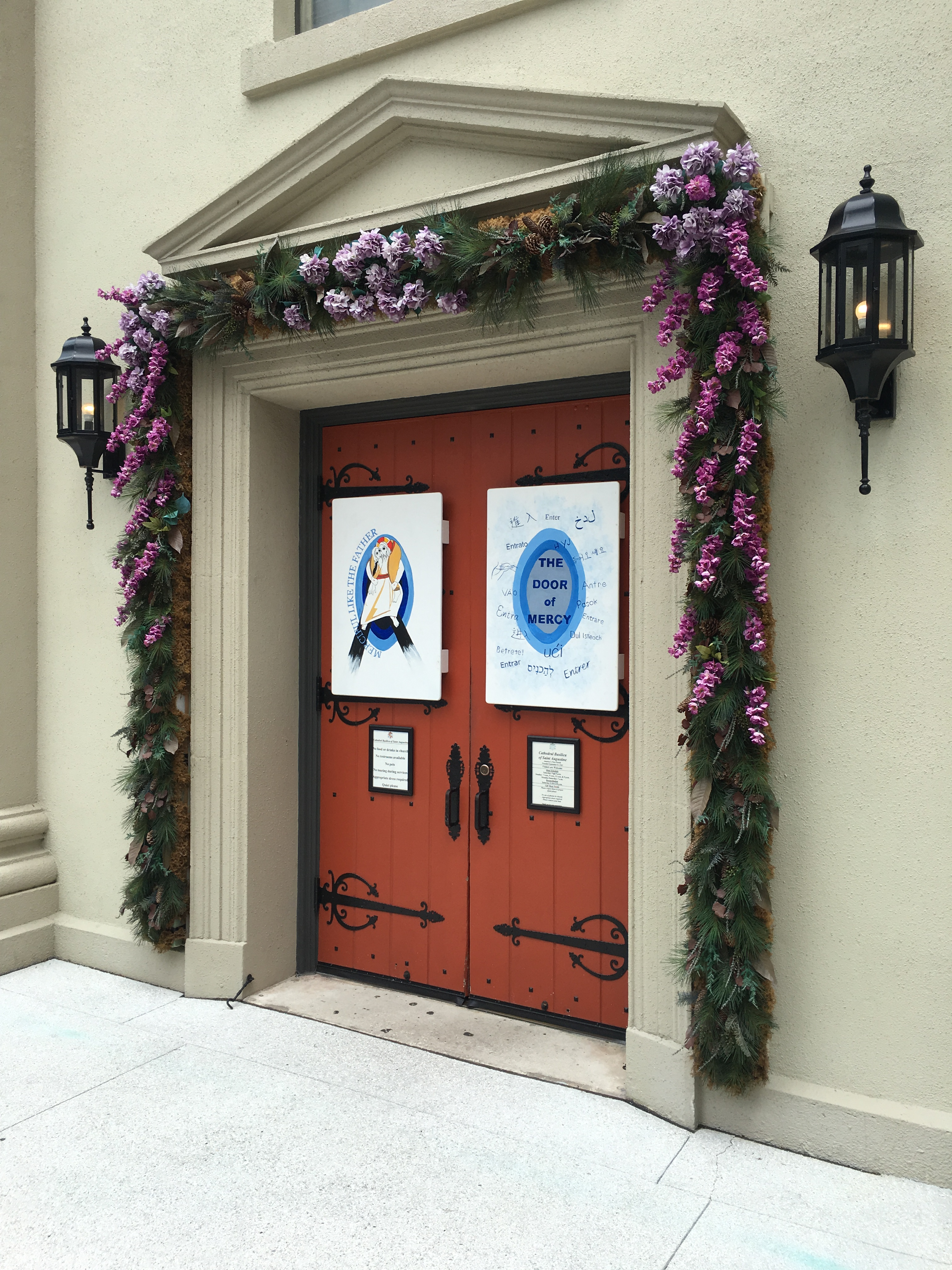
Holy Doors for the Year of Mercy at Cathedral-Basilica of St. Augustine

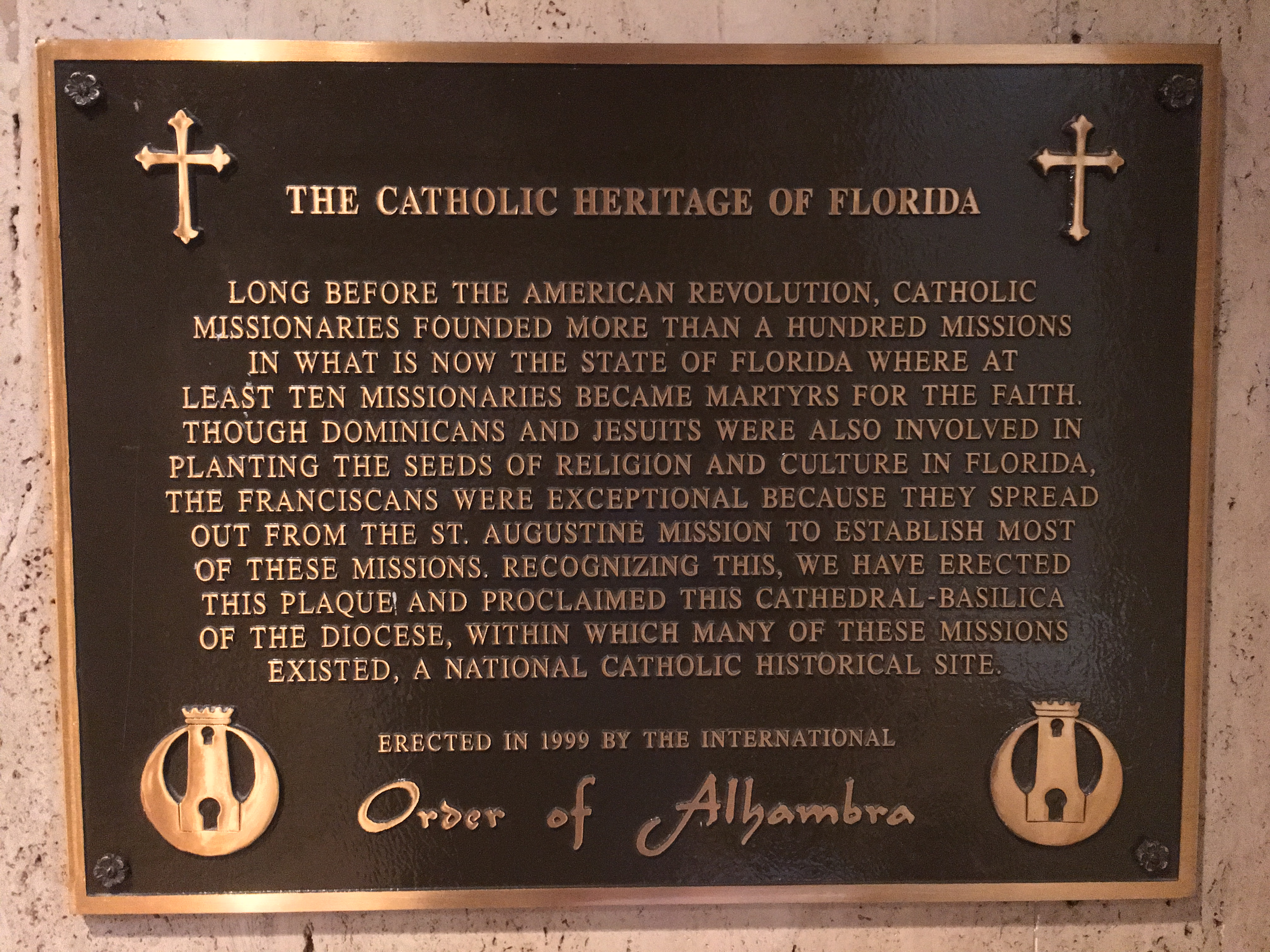
Catholic Heritage of Florida Plaque in Cathedral-Basilica located in narthex

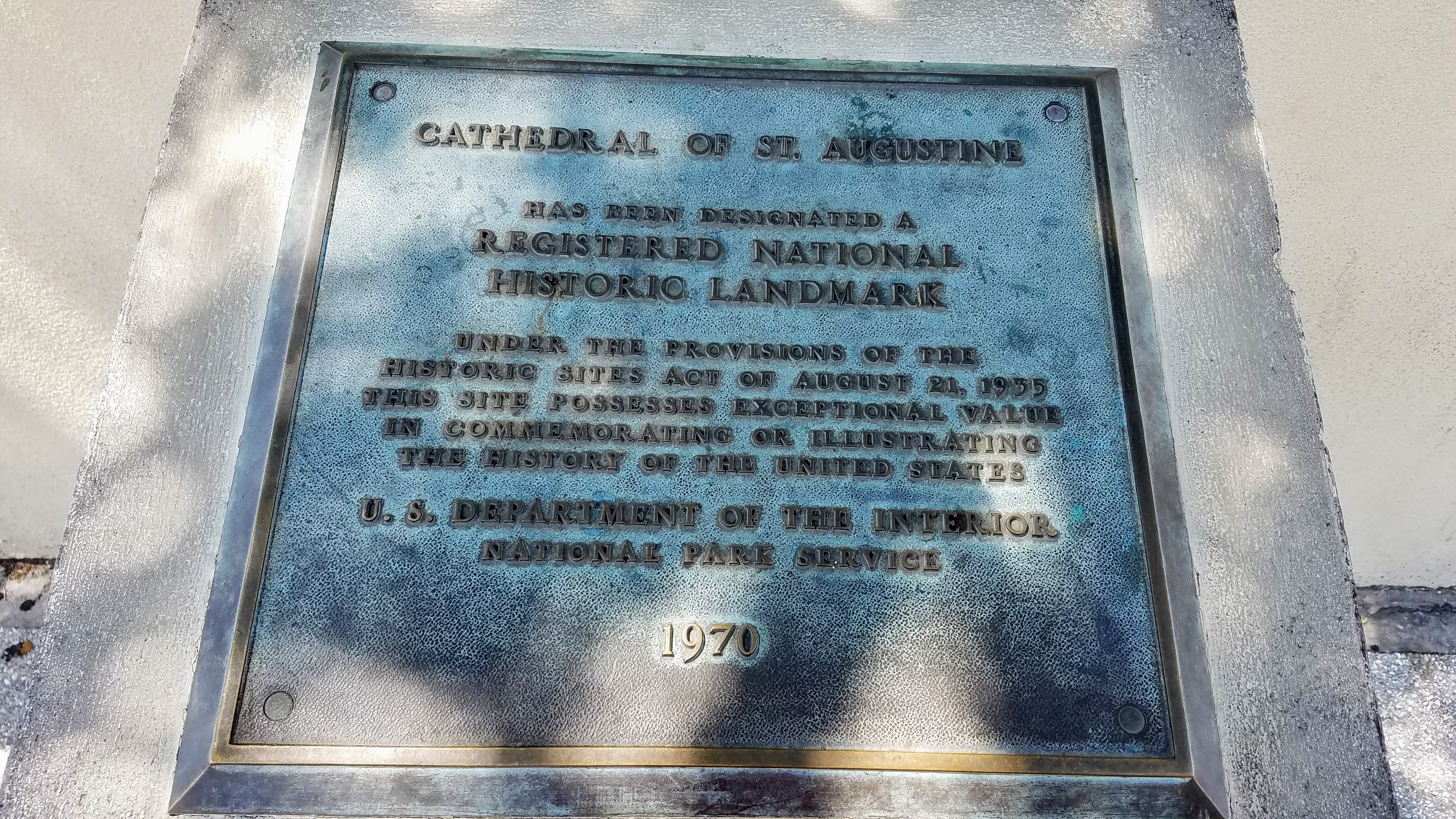
Cathedral of St. Augustine National Historic Landmark Plaque

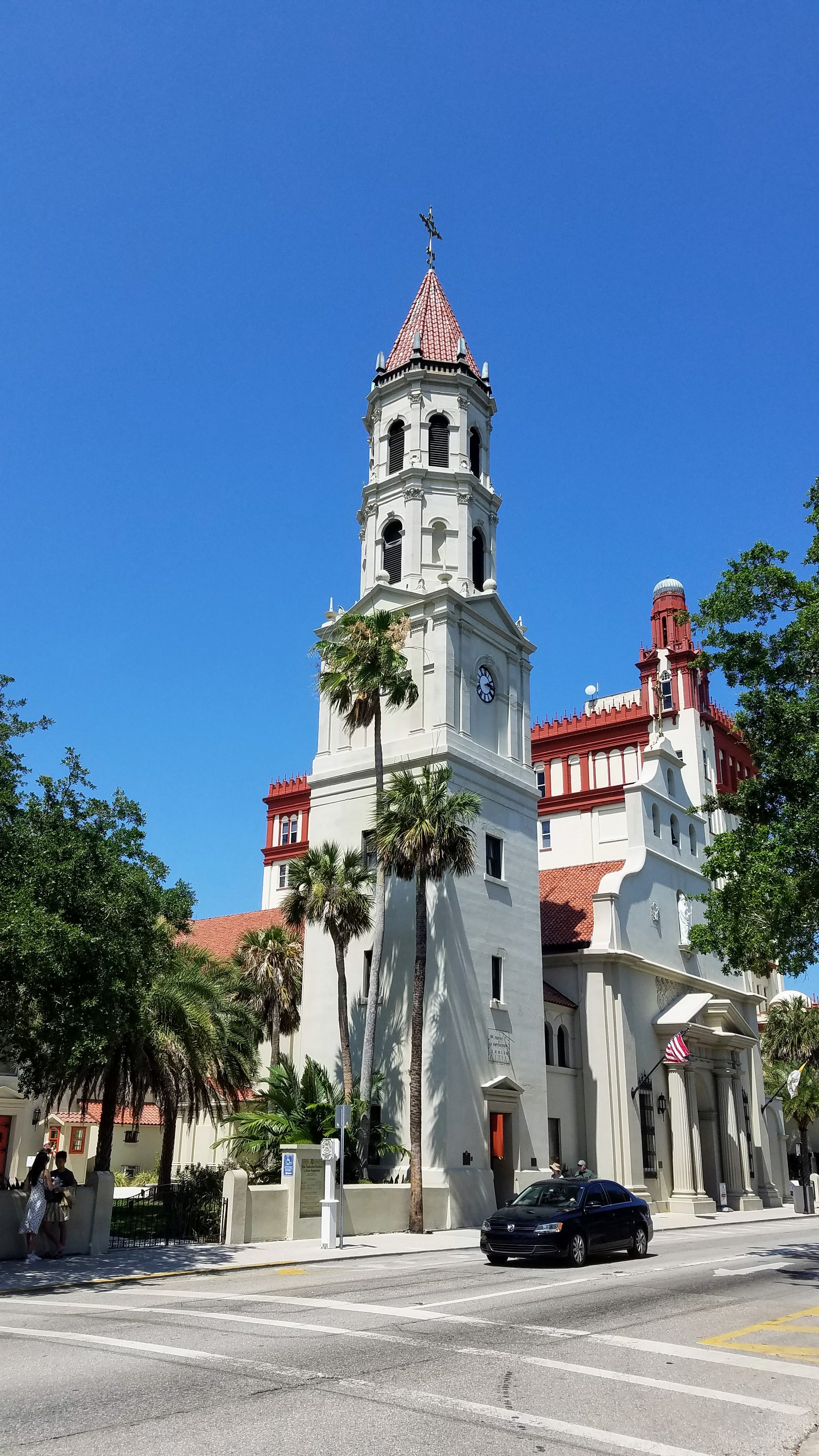
May 2019

== See also ==
- List of Catholic cathedrals in the United States
- List of cathedrals in Florida
