= Arkansas Catholic =

American weekly newspaper

- Type: Weekly newspaper
- Format: Tabloid
- Owner: Diocese of Little Rock
- Founder: Bishop John Baptist Morris
- Publisher: Bishop Anthony B. Taylor
- Editor: Malea Hargett
- Founded: March 25, 1911; 115 years ago
- Language: English
- Headquarters: Little Rock, Arkansas, United States
- Circulation: 6,500
- ISSN: 1057-8439
- Website: www.arkansas-catholic.org
- Free online archives: arc.stparchive.com

Arkansas Catholic is an American weekly newspaper and the official publication of the Roman Catholic Diocese of Little Rock. Founded in 1911 as The Southern Guardian, it was renamed the Arkansas Catholic in 1986. Today it has a circulation of 7,000.

== History ==
=== Founding ===
Ever since Bishop John Baptist Morris arrived in the Diocese of Little Rock from Tennessee in 1907, he wanted to establish a diocesan newspaper for the 22,000 Catholics in Arkansas. On 25 March 1911, the first issue of The Southern Guardian was published. The newspaper's first editor was Monsignor J. M. Lucey, a Confederate veteran of the American Civil War, pastor of St. Joseph Church in Pine Bluff, and vicar general of the diocese. In the first issue, he included a statement, writing:

"The Southern Guardian will be Catholic, by Catholic it is meant Roman Catholic, loyal to the Roman Pontiff, the supreme head of the Church, to the Bishop and clergy of the Diocese, and to the Catholic laity in their varied interests."

Bishop Morris included in the first issue "the bishop's approval" of the new newspaper, writing:

"This marks the realization of a hope cherished since I first came to the Diocese of Little Rock. [...] The Southern Guardian is the official organ of the Diocese of Little Rock, and I pray God that it may be an earnest champion in the cause of right, justice and truth and an ardent defender of the religion which we all love so well. I extend to it my blessing with the sincere hope that its career may be long and prosperous."

The Southern Guardian was published by the Diocese of Little Rock's Catholic Publication Society and printed the newspaper from the society's headquarters on West Markham Street in Little Rock. It was published 52 times a year, or weekly, and cost $1.50 for a subscription.

=== 1910s ===
Six months after its founding, Monsignor Lucey resigned, and Bishop Morris gave position of editor to Father Augustine Stocker, OSB, a Swiss-born Benedictine monk of New Subiaco Abbey. During his tenure, the newspaper offices moved elsewhere in Little Rock twice, first to Fourth and Center streets in 1912, and then to West Second Street in 1919, where they would remain until 1967. In 1915, the word "Southern" was dropped from the newspapers name, now called simply The Guardian. Beginning in 1920, Father Stocker began expanding The Guardian's coverage of Vatican events through Foreign News Service.

Father Stocker wrote over 1,000 editorials and articles during his time at The Guardian, and his editorship was not without controversy. During World War I, because of the Swiss-German heritage of the Subiaco monks, he and The Guardian were subject to suspicions of disloyalty by many locals. Stocker responded by writing an editorial condemning the German Empire and showing strong support of the United States:

"Why should we be suspected of disloyalty? We are all American citizens, and most of us were never Germans in the political sense. It was from Switzerland that the abbey got most of its members until the monastery could produce American-born recruits. We appeal then, to our fair minded fellow-citizens to discontinue the unjust whisperings that would make us traitors."

In addition to his editorial work and his responsibilities at the abbey, Father Stocker was a prolific writer on various subjects, his best-known piece being one on liberal education published by the National Catholic Educational Association. By the 1920s, however, his health was failing, and Stocker was suspicious of physicians, despite his nickname being "Doctor Stocker." He eventually gave in and visited a physician, but died in the doctor's office in 1922. He was replaced by Father George H. McDermott, a diocesan priest.

=== 1920s ===
By 1919, Father McDermott had already become one of the newspaper's better-known contributors after starting a weekly column called the 'Question Box'. It featured answers to religious questions and was written by multiple diocesan and religious priests throughout the decades. By the time Father MCDermott became editor, while The Guardian didn't own its print shop, it owned the press and linotype machine. A subscription in 1929 cost US$2.

=== 1930s ===
Father McDermott retired in 1933, and was replaced by two part-time editors. Monsignor J. P. Fisher served starting in 1933, but worked mostly as the secretary to Bishop Morris. Father Harold Heagney was editor until 1935, but was occupied as the pastor of the Catholic church in Stuttgart. During this time, the newspaper operated at an immense financial loss, partially due to the effects of the Great Depression.

In 1935, Monsignor Thomas J. Prendergast became The Guardian's first full-time editor. He stabilized the newspaper's situation, established its first board of directors and purchasing its own printing shop. During his tenure, The Guardian was transformed from a struggling newspaper to a financially sound and award-winning publication.

Five months after Monsignor Prendergast arrived, he was joined

== List of editors ==
#	Editor	Tenure	Managing Editor	Tenure
1	Msgr. J. M Lucey	1911		
2	Fr. Augustine Stocker, OSB	1911–1922		
3	Fr. George H. McDermott	1922–1933		
4	Msgr. J. P. Fisher	1933–?		
5	Fr. Harold Heagney	?–1935		
6	Msgr. Thomas J. Prendergast	1935–1959		
7	William O'Donnell	1959–1981		
8	Karl Christ	1981–1989	William O'Donnell	1981–1985
8	Karl Christ	1981–1989	Fr. Joseph Conyard, SJ	1985–1988
8	Karl Christ	1981–1989	Fr. Albert Schneider	1988–1995
9	Deborah Halter	1989–1993	Fr. Albert Schneider	1988–1995
10	Peter Hoelscher	1993–1994	Fr. Albert Schneider	1988–1995
11	Malea Hargett	1994–present	Fr. Albert Schneider	1988–1995
11	Malea Hargett	1994–present	Msgr. Francis I. Malone	1995–1997
11	Malea Hargett	1994–present	Daniel Straessle	1997–2000
11	Malea Hargett	1994–present	none	2000–present
