= Lawrence Preston Joseph Graves =

Roman Catholic bishop

His Excellency, The Most Reverend Lawrence Preston Joseph Graves
- Bishop of Alexandria-Shreveport; Titular Bishop of Vina
- See: Diocese of Alexandria-Shreveport
- In office: 1976 to 1982
- Predecessor: Charles Pasquale Greco
- Successor: William Benedict Friend
- Previous posts: Bishop of Alexandria (1973 to 1976); Auxiliary Bishop of Little Rock (1969 to 1973)

Orders
- Ordination: June 11, 1942 by John Baptist Morris
- Consecration: April 25, 1970 by Albert Lewis Fletcher

Personal details
- Born: May 4, 1916 Texarkana, Arkansas, US
- Died: January 15, 1994 (aged 77)
- Education: St. John Home Mission Seminary; Pontifical North American College; Catholic University of America

Lawrence Preston Joseph Graves (May 4, 1916 – January 15, 1994) served as the first bishop of the Diocese of Alexandria-Shreveport in Louisiana (1976–1982). He previously served as an auxiliary bishop of the Diocese of Little Rock in Arkansas (1969–1973) and as bishop of the Diocese of Alexandria (1973 -1976)

== Biography ==
Lawrence Graves was born on May 4, 1916, in Texarkana, Arkansas. He attended the St. John Home Mission Seminary in Little Rock, Arkansas. He then studied at the Pontifical North American College in Rome, and at the Catholic University of America in Washington, D.C.

Graves was ordained to the priesthood for the Diocese of Little Rock by Bishop John Baptist Morris on June 11, 1942.

=== Auxiliary Bishop of Little Rock ===
On February 24, 1969, Graves was appointed auxiliary bishop of Little Rock and Titular Bishop of Vina by Pope Paul VI. He received his episcopal consecration at the Cathedral of St. Andrew in Little Rock, Arkansas, on April 25, 1969, from Bishop Albert Fletcher, with Bishops Lawrence De Falco and Warren L. Boudreaux serving as co-consecrators.

=== Bishop of Alexandria and Alexandria-Shreveport ===
Following the retirement of Bishop Charles Greco, on May 10, 1973, Graves was named bishop of Alexandria by Paul VI . During his tenure, Graves established or improved continuing education for priests, offices for religious education and youth ministry, permanent diaconate program, and the communications apostolate in newspaper, radio, and television. Paul VI changed the Diocese of Alexandria to the Diocese of Alexandria-Shreveport in 1976, with Greco remaining as bishop.

=== Retirement and death ===
Graves resigned as bishop of Alexandria-Shreveport on July 20, 1982. He died on January 15, 1994 at age 77.

== Episcopal succession ==
Catholic Church titles
Preceded by Charles Pasquale Greco	Bishop of Alexandria in Louisiana; 1973—1982	Succeeded by William Benedict Friend
Preceded by –	Auxiliary Bishop of Little Rock; 1969—1973	Succeeded by –
