= Erik T. Pohlmeier =

American Catholic prelate (born 1971)

His Excellency, The Most Reverend Erik Thomas Pohlmeier
- Bishop of St. Augustine
- Diocese: St. Augustine
- Appointed: May 24, 2022
- Installed: July 22, 2022
- Predecessor: Felipe de Jesús Estévez

Orders
- Ordination: July 25, 1998 by Andrew Joseph McDonald
- Consecration: July 22, 2022 by Thomas Wenski, Felipe de Jesús Estévez, and Anthony Taylor

Personal details
- Born: July 20, 1971 (age 55) Colorado Springs, Colorado, US
- Education: University of Arkansas in Fayetteville; Pontifical Gregorian University; Pontifical University of Saint Thomas Aquinas
- Motto: Seek first the kingdom of God

Styles of Erik Thomas Pohlmeier
- Reference style: His Excellency; The Most Reverend
- Spoken style: Your Excellency
- Religious style: Bishop

Erik Thomas Pohlmeier (born July 20, 1971) is an American Catholic prelate who serves as the bishop of Saint Augustine in Florida.

== Biography ==
=== Early life ===
Erik Pohlmeier was born on July 20, 1971, in Colorado Springs, Colorado, one of five children of Tom and Sharon Pohlmeier. Pohlmeier enrolled in the University of Arkansas in Fayetteville in 1989 to study mechanical engineering. Having decided to become a priest, he left the university after two years to enter the Saint Meinrad Seminary and School of Theology in Indiana. He received a Bachelor of Arts degree in philosophy from Saint Meinrad in 1994.

After finishing at Saint Meinrad, Pohlmeier traveled to Rome to attend the seminary at the Pontifical North American College. He received a Bachelor of Sacred Theology degree from the Pontifical Gregorian University in Rome in 1997. He was ordained a deacon on October 7, 1997, at St. Peter's Basilica in Rome. The next year, Pohlmeier finished a Master of Arts degree in spirituality from the Pontifical University of Saint Thomas Aquinas in Rome.

=== Priesthood ===
Pohlmeier was ordained a priest at the Subiaco Abbey in Arkansas, for the Diocese of Little Rock by Bishop Andrew McDonald on July 25, 1998. After his 1998 ordination, the diocese assigned Pohlmeier as associate pastor at Christ the King in Little Rock from 1998 to 2001. He was then made pastor at these parishes in Arkansas:

- Our Lady of the Lake in Lake Village, St. Mary Church mission in McGehee and Holy Child of Jesus in Dumas (2001 to 2005)
- Holy Spirit in Hamburg (2004 to 2005)
- Church of Saint John the Baptist in Hot Springs (2005 to 2010)
- Our Lady of the Holy Souls in Little Rock (2010 to 2016)

In 2015, Bishop Anthony Taylor appointed Pohlmeier as director of the permanent diaconate formation program. In 2016, Pohlmeier became director of the office of faith formation. He was named director of continuing education of the clergy in 2019. In 2020, he returned to Christ the King in Little Rock as pastor, while retaining the aforementioned diocesan duties. Pohlmeier is fluent in Spanish.

=== Bishop of Saint Augustine ===
Pope Francis appointed Pohlmeier bishop of St. Augustine on May 24, 2022. Pohlmeier was consecrated as bishop by Archbishop Thomas Gerard Wenski at St. Joseph Church in Jacksonville, Florida, on July 22, 2022, with Bishops Felipe de Jesús Estévez and Anthony Taylor serving as co-consecrators. Pohlmeier chose as his episcopal motto: "Seek first the kingdom of God" (Mt 6:33).

In August 2023, Pohlmeier condemned the racially motivated 2023 Jacksonville shooting at a Dollar General store that left three African-Americans dead:

It has come to light that the shooter’s motivations were fueled by hatred and bigotry, as he targeted innocent lives solely because of their race. This reprehensible act reminds us of the deep-seated wounds that still afflict our society — wounds rooted in prejudice and racism.

== See also ==
- Catholic Church hierarchy
- Catholic Church in the United States
- Historical list of the Catholic bishops of the United States
- List of Catholic bishops of the United States
- Lists of patriarchs, archbishops, and bishops

Catholic Church titles
Preceded by Felipe de Jesús Estévez	Bishop of St. Augustine; 2022-present	Succeeded by Incumbent
