= Andrew Byrne =

Irish-born American Catholic priest and bishop

His Excellency, The Right Reverend Andrew Byrne
- Bishop of Little Rock
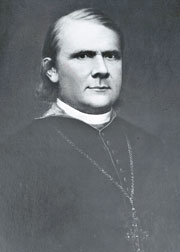
- Church: Catholic Church
- Diocese: Diocese of Little Rock
- Installed: November 28, 1843
- Term ended: June 10, 1862
- Predecessor: None (first bishop)
- Successor: Edward Fitzgerald

Orders
- Ordination: November 11, 1827 by John England
- Consecration: March 10, 1844 by John Hughes

Personal details
- Born: 1802 Navan, County Meath, Ireland
- Died: June 10, 1862 (aged 59) Helena, Arkansas, US
- Buried: Cathedral of St. Andrew, Little Rock, Arkansas, US
- Education: St. Finian College
- Motto: Vox clamantis in deserto (The voice of one crying in the wilderness)

Andrew J. Byrne (1802 – June 10, 1862) was an Irish-born American Catholic priest, who became the first bishop of the Diocese of Little Rock in Arkansas from 1844 until his death in 1862.

== Biography ==
=== Early life ===
Andrew Byrne was born in 1802 in Navan, County Meath, in Ireland, the son of Robert and Margery Moore Byrne. Baptized on December 3, 1802, he was possibly born on November 30. While studying at St. Finian's College in Navan, Byrne was recruited in 1820 by Bishop John England to immigrate to the United States and serve in the new Diocese of Charleston in South Carolina.

=== Priesthood ===
Byrne was ordained to the priesthood in Charleston, South Carolina, by Bishop England for the Diocese of Charleston, on November 11, 1827. After a period of missionary work in South Carolina and North Carolina, England appointed Byrne as pastor of St. Mary's Parish in Charleston. Byrne was eventually named vicar general of the diocese. At the Second Baltimore Council in Baltimore, Maryland, in 1833, he acted as England's theologian.

In 1836, Byrne was incardinated, or transferred, to the Diocese of New York, in New York City, where he served at St. Patrick's Parish, and St. James's Parish, both in Manhattan. In 1841, Bishop John Hughes sent him to Ireland to recruit the Christian Brothers to teach in the diocesan schools. After Catholics in Manhattan purchased the former Universalist Church known as Carroll Hall, Byrne founded St. Andrew Parish there, which Hughes dedicated on March 19, 1842. Byrne also organized the Church of the Nativity Parish in Manhattan, which Hughes dedicated on June 5, 1842.

=== Bishop of Little Rock ===
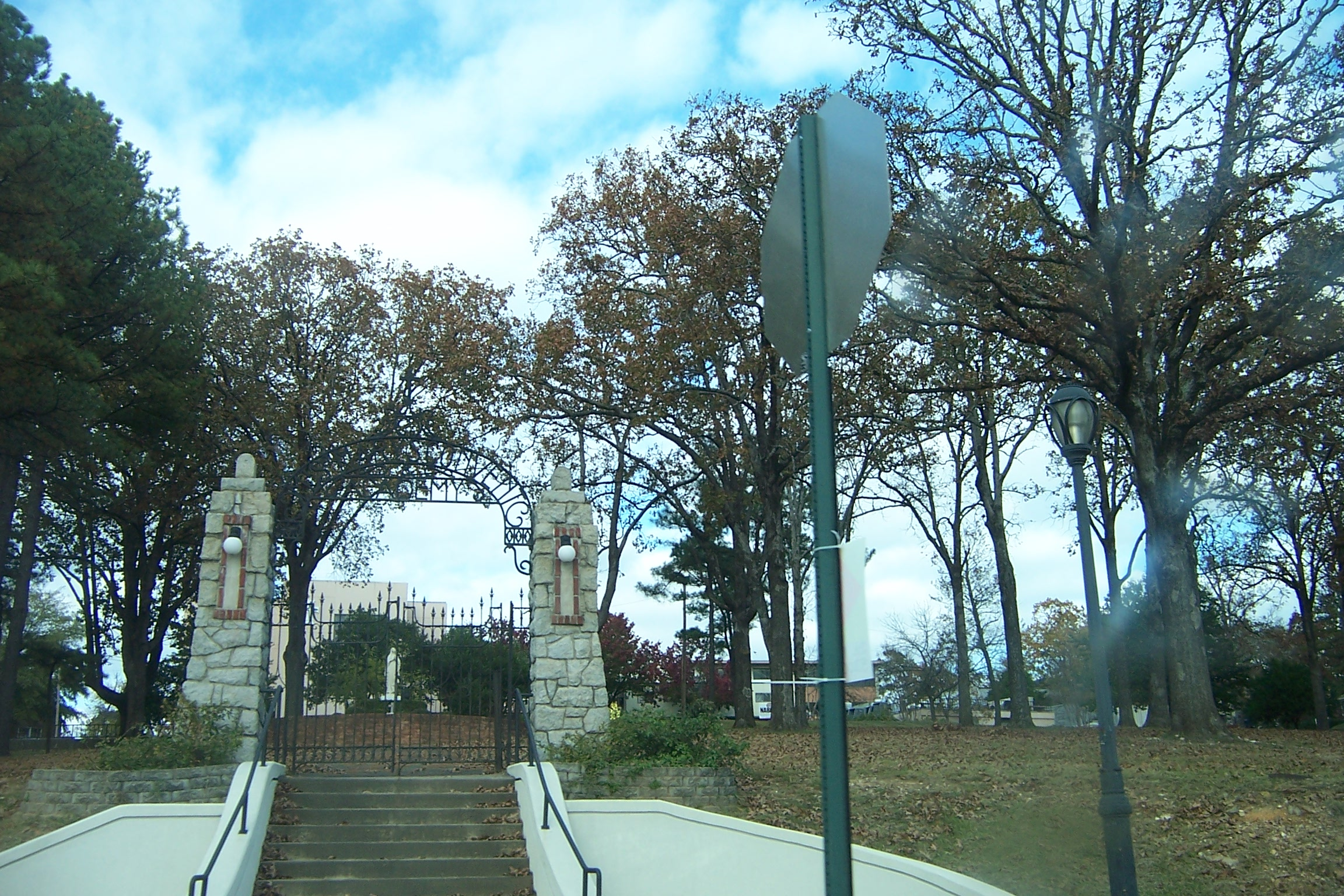
Mount St. Mary Academy, Little Rock, Arkansas (2008)

On November 28, 1843, Byrne was appointed bishop of the new Diocese of Little Rock by Pope Gregory XVI. Byrne was consecrated in St. Patrick's Cathedral in Manhattan on March 10, 1844, by Bishop Hughes.

When Byrne arrived in Arkansas, his diocese had approximately 700 Catholics, with four priests and four churches. He brought two priests with him, and together they established St. Ambrose Church at Arkansas Post, Arkansas. A year later, they designated St. Andrew Church in Little Rock as the first Cathedral of St. Andrew. Byrne established other parishes at Pine Bluff and New Gascony, Arkansas. Byrne visited Ireland twice to obtain assistants. He persuaded the Sisters of Mercy to come to his newly established diocese. Four sisters and five postulants arrived in 1851 and established a school in Little Rock that would later become Mount St. Mary Academy. The sisters also opened convent schools at Fort Smith and Helena, Arkansas.

A fire of suspicious origin destroyed the church in Helena in 1854, as the Know Nothings’ influence in Arkansas grew. Byrne avoided political issues, including that of slavery. The record shows that he was not a slave owner, but did not express any sentiments regarding the issue. Byrne attended the Sixth Provincial Council of Baltimore in May, 1846, and the First Provincial Council of New Orleans in 1856.

By Byrne's death, the diocese had grown to include nine priests, 13 churches, 30 stations, and 12 schools and academies, and had almost completed arrangements for the starting of a college at Fort Smith by the Congregation of Christian Brothers.

Andrew Byrne died on June 10, 1862, in Helena at age 59.

== Sources ==
- Catholic Almanac (Baltimore, 1864);
- John Gilmary Shea, The Catholic Church in N. Y. City (New York, 1878);
- Richard Henry Clarke, Lives of the Deceased Bishops (New York, 1872);
- James Roosevelt Bayley, Brief Sketch of the Early History of the Catholic Church on the Island of New York (New York, 1870)

Catholic Church titles
| Preceded by none (diocese erected) | Bishop of Little Rock; 1844—1862 | Succeeded by Edward Fitzgerald |
