= John J. Snyder =

American Roman Catholic prelate (1925–2019)

His Excellency, The Most Reverend John Joseph Snyder
- Bishop of St. Augustine; Titular Bishop of Forum Popilii
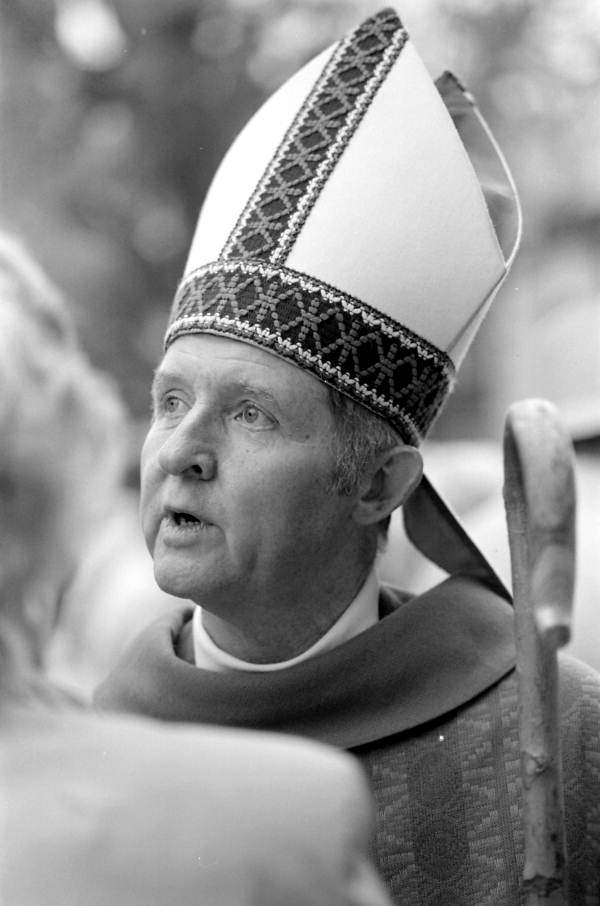
- Bishop Snyder in 1983
- Church: Catholic Church
- Diocese: Diocese of Saint Augustine
- Appointed: October 2, 1979
- Installed: December 5, 1979
- Term ended: December 12, 2000
- Predecessor: Paul F. Tanner
- Successor: Victor Galeone
- Previous post: Auxiliary Bishop of Brooklyn (1972 to 1979)

Orders
- Ordination: June 9, 1951 by Thomas Edmund Molloy
- Consecration: February 2, 1973 by Francis Mugavero, John Joseph Boardman, Paul Leonard Hagarty

Personal details
- Born: John Joseph Snyder; October 25, 1925 New York City, New York, US
- Died: September 27, 2019 (aged 93) Jacksonville, Florida, US
- Education: Cathedral College; Immaculate Conception Seminary
- Motto: Peace in Christ

Styles of John Joseph Snyder
- Reference style: His Excellency; The Most Reverend
- Spoken style: Your Excellency
- Religious style: Bishop

John Joseph Snyder (October 25, 1925 – September 27, 2019) was an American prelate of the Catholic Church. He served as the eighth bishop of the Diocese of St. Augustine in Florida from 1979 to 2000. Snyder previously served as an auxiliary bishop of the Diocese of Brooklyn in New York from 1972 to 1979

== Biography ==
=== Early life ===
Snyder was born in New York City on October 25, 1925, to John Joseph and Katherine Walsh Snyder. He attended St. Bartholomew and St. Andrew Avellino schools before studying for the priesthood at Cathedral College in Brooklyn, New York, and Immaculate Conception Seminary in Huntington, New York.

=== Priesthood ===
Snyder was ordained to the priesthood at the St. James Pro-Cathedral in Brooklyn for the Diocese of Brooklyn on June 9, 1951, by Bishop Thomas Molloy.After serving for six years at St. Mel Parish in Flushing, New York, Snyder was appointed assistant secretary (1957–1968) to Bishop Bryan J. McEntegart and then secretary (1968–1972) to Bishop Francis J. Mugavero.

=== Auxiliary Bishop of Brooklyn ===
On December 13, 1972, Pope Paul VI appointed Snyder as an auxiliary bishop of Brooklyn. He was consecrated on February 2, 1973, at the Church of Our Lady of Perpetual Help in Brooklyn. Mugavero served as principal consecrator, with bishops John Boardman and Paul Hagarty serving as principal co-consecrators.

=== Bishop of St. Augustine ===
In October 1979, Pope John Paul II appointed Snyder as bishop of Saint Augustine, where he was installed on December 5, 1979. His episcopal motto was "Peace in Christ".

=== Retirement and legacy ===
As required by canon law, Snyder submitted his resignation as bishop of St. Augustine to the Vatican on his 75th birthday on October 25, 2000. John Paul II accepted Snyder's resignation on December 12, 2000.Snyder was elected diocesan administrator on December 15, 2000, by the diocesan college of consultors and served as administrator until August 21, 2001, when Monsignor Victor Galeone was consecrated bishop. John Snyder died in Jacksonville, Florida, on September 27, 2019, at age 93.

Bishop John J. Snyder High School in Jacksonville, is named after him. Snyder celebrated an annual mass at the school and attended many home sports games.

== Episcopal succession ==
Catholic Church titles
Preceded by Paul F. Tanner	Bishop of St. Augustine; 1979–2000	Succeeded by Victor Galeone
Preceded by -	Auxiliary Bishop of Brooklyn; 1973–1979	Succeeded by -

== See also ==
- Catholic Church hierarchy
- Catholic Church in the United States
- Historical list of the Catholic bishops of the United States
- List of Catholic bishops of the United States
- Lists of patriarchs, archbishops, and bishops
