= Galeone =

Galeone is an Italian surname. Notable people with the surname include:

- Assunta Galeone (born 1998), Italian judoka
- Giovanni Galeone (1941–2025), Italian football player and manager
- Victor Galeone (1935–2023), American Roman Catholic bishop
