= St. Joseph Catholic Church (Tontitown, Arkansas) =

Historic church in Arkansas, United States

- Formerly listed on the U.S. National Register of Historic Places
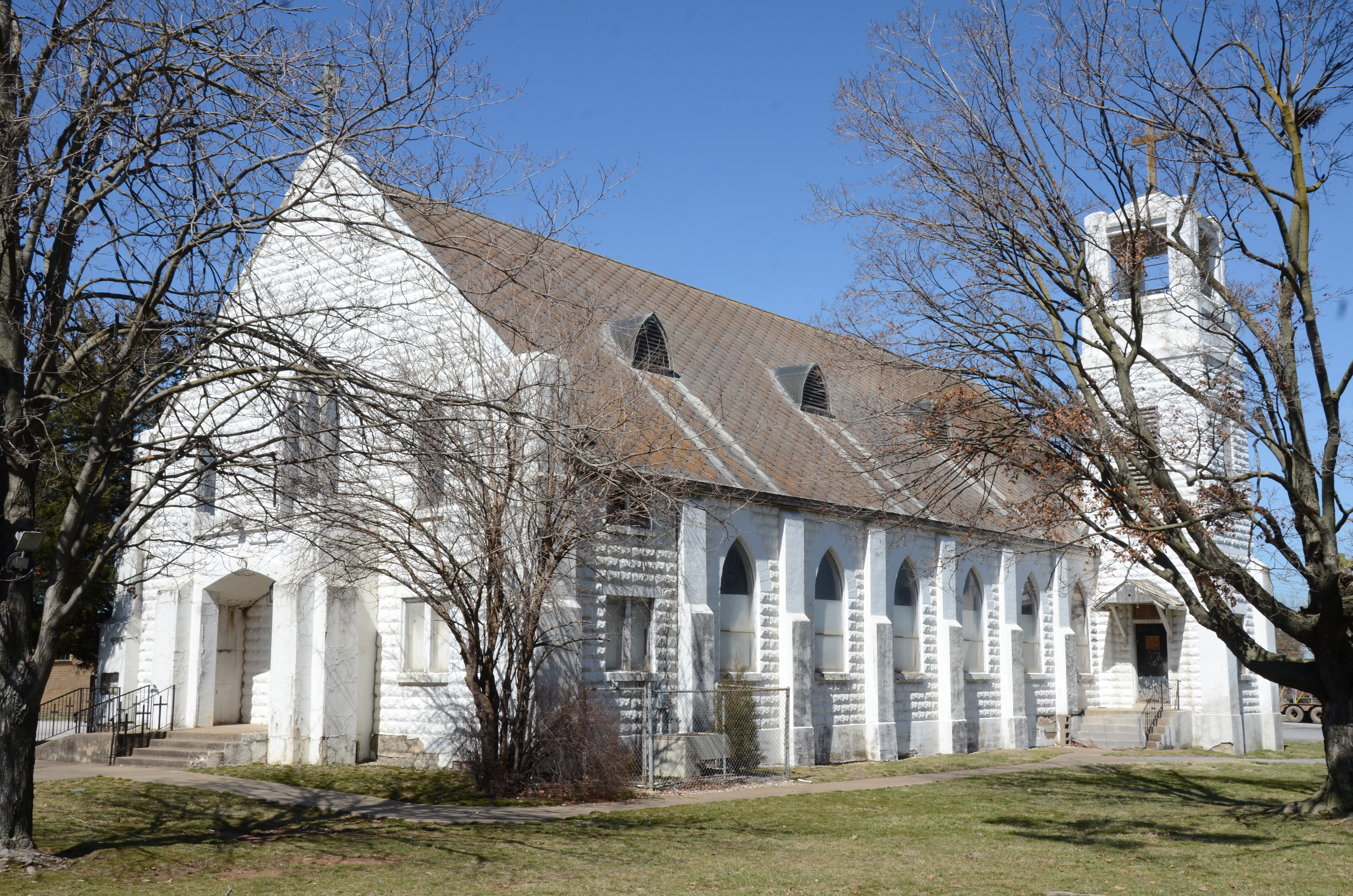

- Location within Arkansas Location within the United States
- Location: 110 E. Henri de Tonti Blvd., Tontitown, Arkansas
- Coordinates: 36°10′43″N 94°14′6″W
- Area: 5.1 acres (2.1 ha)
- Built: 1939
- Architectural style: Gothic Revival
- NRHP reference No.: 06000080

Significant dates
- Added to NRHP: March 2, 2006
- Removed from NRHP: January 2, 2024

St. Joseph Catholic Church is a parish of the Catholic Church located in Tontitown, Arkansas, in the Diocese of Little Rock. The parish and the town were established by a group of Italian Americans led by Father Pietro Bandini, who settled in the area as miners and tenant farmers in the late 19th century. According to local tradition, a picture of Saint Joseph hanging in the schoolhouse was untouched by an arson fire, and the parish was therefore dedicated to him.

The historic parish church is located at 110 E. Henri de Tonti Boulevard. It is a large Late Gothic structure, built in 1939–44 from rusticated concrete blocks that were fashioned on site. Its architecture is characterized by buttresses, lancet-arched windows, and a square tower with open belfry projecting at one corner. The main entrance, on the south gable end, has a projecting arched surround finished in stucco. The church has been a major cultural civic center for the local Italian community, and was listed on the National Register of Historic Places in 2006. It was delisted in 2024.

The high school Ozark Catholic Academy is on the church property.

== See also ==
- Tontitown School Building
- National Register of Historic Places listings in Washington County, Arkansas
