= Ozark Catholic Academy =

Catholic school in Arkansas, United States

Coordinates: 36.1771°N 94.2334°W

Location
- 192 E. Henri de Tonti Blvd; Tontitown, United States, Arkansas 72762

Information
- School type: Private
- Motto: Docilitas, Veritas, Libertas, Sanctificate (Docility, Truth, Freedom, Santification)
- Religious affiliation: Roman Catholic
- Opened: 2018
- President: Robbie Estes
- Principal: Angie Collins
- Grades: 9-12
- Student to teacher ratio: 24:1
- Colors: Blue and white
- Mascot: The Griffin
- Annual tuition: $9750

Ozark Catholic Academy is a Roman Catholic high school on the property of St. Joseph Catholic Church in Tontitown, Arkansas. It is affiliated with the Roman Catholic Diocese of Little Rock.

The school's student body was to originate from Tontitown, Bentonville, Cave Springs, Fayetteville, Rogers, Springdale, and Subiaco. It was the first upper secondary Catholic school to be created in the Northwest Arkansas area.

== History ==
Circa 1998 people associated with the school began efforts to create a Catholic high school in the area.

It opened in 2018 with grades 9 and 10, with other grade levels added after. Originally the school used six classrooms in the Father Bandini Education Center on a temporary basis. The school gained traction with the community.

In 2024, founder and then head of school John Rocha left his position after 6 years of leadership. The school transitioned to a President/Principal model of leadership moving forward with Robbie Estes becoming President and Angie Collins being hired as principal starting with the 2024-25 school year.

Ozark Catholic Academy had a strong track, cross country, and competitive dance programs with multiple state titles in each sport through the Arkansas Activities Association.
