= Jerry Jones Jr. =

American businessman (born 1969)

Jerral Wayne Jones Jr. (born September 27, 1969) is the chief sales and marketing officer and executive vice president of the Dallas Cowboys. Jones Jr. was the president and general manager of the Dallas Desperados when it was founded by his father in 2001 in the original Arena Football League He now leads the Cowboys' commercial initiatives.

Jones grew up in Arkansas and was inducted into the Arkansas Sports Hall of Fame in 2019 for his contributions to Little Rock Catholic.

== Personal life ==
Jones is the son of Dallas Cowboys owner Jerry Jones and the younger brother of Cowboys executives Stephen Jones and Charlotte Jones Anderson. He is the father of a daughter, Juliette Turner-Jones, as the result of a former relationship with television and film actress Janine Turner in the 1990s. He married Lori Lemon in 2006, and has two children with her.

In October 2024, Jones Jr. was involved in a car accident near Levi's Stadium in California. The incident occurred when a rising barricade caused significant damage to the vehicle carrying Jones Jr., his sister Charlotte, and his nephew Shy Anderson Jr. Jones Jr. sustained a concussion but has since been reported to be recovering.

== External ==
- Dallas Cowboys bio
