= Stephen Jones (American football) =

Executive Vice President/COO for the Dallas Cowboys (born 1964)

- Born: June 21, 1964 (age 61); Danville, Arkansas, U.S.
- Education: University of Arkansas
- Occupation: Businessman
- Parent: Jerry Jones
- Relatives: Charlotte Jones Anderson (sister); Jerry Jones Jr. (brother)

Stephen Jones (born June 21, 1964) is the co-owner, executive vice president, CEO, and director of player personnel for the Dallas Cowboys of the National Football League (NFL). He is the eldest son of Dallas Cowboys owner Jerry Jones, and the older brother of Cowboys executives Jerry Jones Jr. and Charlotte Jones Anderson.

Jones graduated from Catholic High School for Boys and the University of Arkansas with a degree in chemical engineering in 1988. During his collegiate career, he was a member of Phi Delta Theta. He was a 4-year letterman for the Razorbacks, playing linebacker and on special teams, and started in the 1987 Orange Bowl.
