= Tontitown School Building =

- U.S. National Register of Historic Places
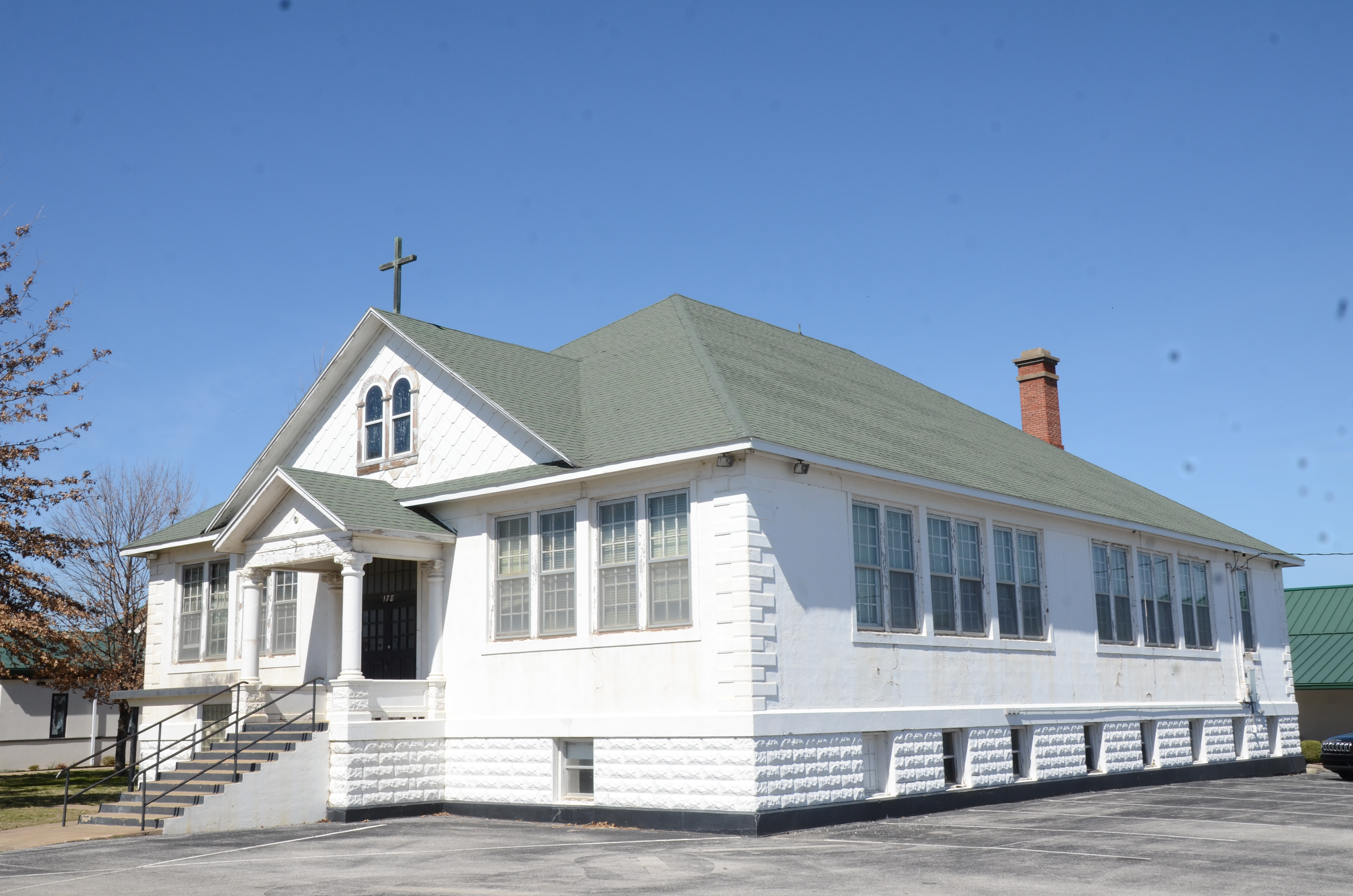

- Location within Arkansas Location within the United States
- Location: 178 E. Henri de Tonti Boulevard (US 412); Tontitown, Arkansas
- Coordinates: 36°10′36″N 94°14′0″W
- Area: less than one acre
- Architectural style: Late 19th And Early 20th Century American Movements, Classical;Plain Traditional
- MPS: Public Schools in the Ozarks MPS
- NRHP reference No.: 92001117
- Added to NRHP: September 4, 1992

The Tontitown School Building is a historic former school building on US Highway 412 (US 412) in Tontitown, Arkansas. It is a single-story hip-roofed building, fashioned out of concrete blocks. It has corner blocks set in a quoin pattern, and gabled dormers front and rear which house paired round-arch windows. The front entry is sheltered by a gabled portico supported by Corinthian columns. The school was built in 1920 to accommodated the community's growing Italian immigrant population. The building is now owned by the adjacent St. Joseph's Church.

The building was listed on the National Register of Historic Places in 1992.

== See also ==
- National Register of Historic Places listings in Washington County, Arkansas
