= Edward Fitzgerald (bishop) =

Catholic bishop

His Excellency, The Right Reverend Edward Mary Fitzgerald
- Bishop of Little Rock
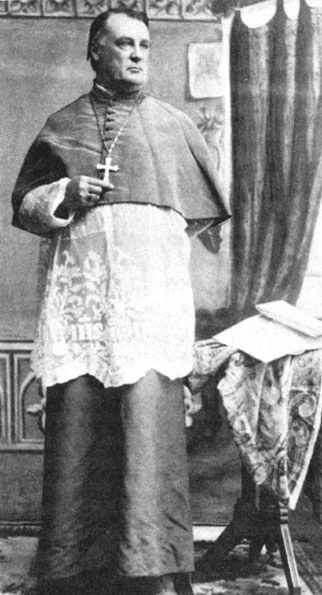
- Church: Roman Catholic Church
- See: Diocese of Little Rock
- In office: February 3, 1867— February 21, 1907
- Predecessor: Andrew Byrne
- Successor: John Baptist Morris

Orders
- Ordination: August 22, 1857 by John Baptist Purcell
- Consecration: February 3, 1867 by John Baptist Purcell

Personal details
- Born: October 28, 1833 Limerick, County Limerick, Ireland
- Died: February 21, 1907 (aged 73) Hot Springs, Arkansas, US
- Education: St. Mary's of the Barrens Seminary; Mount St. Mary's Seminary of the West; Mount St. Mary's College
- Motto: Infirma mundi elegit Deus (God chose the weak of the world)

Edward Mary Fitzgerald (October 28, 1833—February 21, 1907) was an Irish-born American prelate of the Roman Catholic Church. He served as bishop of the Diocese of Little Rock in Arkansas from 1867 until his death in 1907.

== Biography ==
=== Early life ===
Edward Fitzgerald was born on October 28, 1833, in Limerick, Ireland, to James and Joanna (née Pratt) Fitzgerald. He was one of eight children one of whom, Joseph, also became a priest. In 1849, the family immigrated to the United States due to the Great Famine of Ireland. Deciding to become a priest, Fitzgerald attended St. Mary's of the Barrens Seminary at Perryville, Missouri, from 1850 to 1852. Fitzgerald completed his theological studies at Mount St. Mary's Seminary of the West in Cincinnati, Ohio and at Mount St. Mary's College in Emmitsburg, Maryland.

=== Priesthood ===
Fitzgerald was ordained to the priesthood for the Archdiocese of Cincinnati by Archbishop John Baptist Purcell in Cincinnati on August 22, 1857. His first, and only pastoral assignment. was pastor of St. Patrick's Parish in Columbus, Ohio, where he mediated a divisive ethnic schism between the Irish and German immigrants. Fitzgerald gained his American citizenship in 1859.

During the American Civil War in the early 1860s, Fitzgerald organized an Irish-American military company called the Montgomery Guards that fought with the Union Army. He frequently visited Camp Chase in Columbus to minister to Confederate Army prisoners.

=== Bishop of Little Rock ===
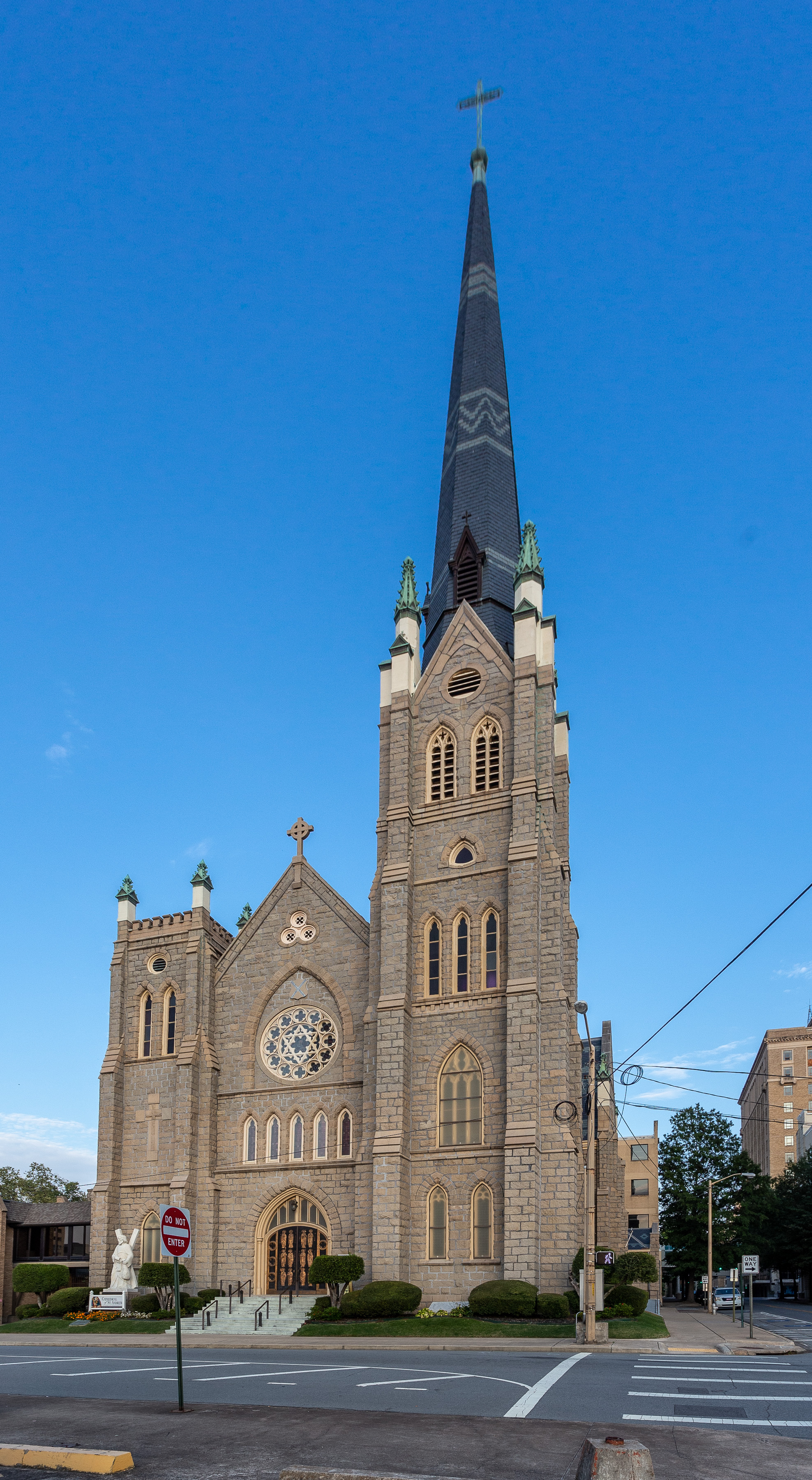
Cathedral of Saint Andrew, Little Rock, Arkansas (2022)

On April 24, 1866, Fitzgerald was appointed the second bishop of Little Rock by Pope Pius IX. Fitzgerald initially refused the appointment, but was commanded by Pius IX to accept it in December 1866. He received his episcopal consecration on February 3, 1867, from Purcell, with Bishops John Lynch and Sylvester Rosecrans serving as co-consecrators, at St. Patrick's Church. At age 33, he was the youngest member of the American hierarchy.

Arriving in Arkansas by steamboat in March 1867, he found four parishes, five priests, and 1,600 Catholics; by the time of his death in 1907, there were 41 churches with resident priests, 32 missions, 60 priests, and 20,000 Catholics. He first rebuilt the churches and missions ravaged during the war. From 1869 to 1870, he attended the First Vatican Council in Rome. At the council, Fitzgerald was the only U.S. bishop to vote against papal infallibility. While he believed in the theological grounds for infallibility, he feared that its dogmatic definition would hamper the conversion of non-Catholics in Arkansas. However, he fully submitted to the council's decision when the tally ended.

Fitzgerald encouraged Catholic immigration to Arkansas from Germany, Italy, and Poland; he introduced the Benedictine Sisters and the Sisters of Charity; and established St. Benedict's Priory in Subiaco, Arkansas. He laid the cornerstone of Cathedral of St. Andrew in July 1878, and dedicated it in November 1881. Fitzgerald delivered the opening sermon at the Third Plenary Council of Baltimore in 1884, and opened St. Vincent's Infirmary, the first Catholic hospital in Arkansas, in 1888. In 1894 he dedicated the first Catholic church in Arkansas for African Americans, at Pine Bluff, Arkansas.

Fitzgerald suffered a stroke in January 1900, and was subsequently paralyzed. Pope Pius X appointed Reverend John Morris as his coadjutor bishop in June 1906. Fitzgerald also suffered from depression, once writing,

"I find in me a growing dislike in making exertions of any kind, a bad sign in me, no longer a young man...I am overwhelmed with despondency and gloom."

=== Death and legacy ===
Edward Fitzgerald died at St. Joseph's Hospital in Hot Springs, Arkansas, on February 20, 1907, at age 73. He is buried in a crypt under the Cathedral of St. Andrew.

Catholic Church titles
Preceded by Andrew Byrne	Bishop of Little Rock; 1867—1907	Succeeded by John Baptist Morris
