= Charles Pasquale Greco =

American prelate

His Excellency, The Most Reverend Charles Pasquale Greco
- Bishop of Alexandria in Louisiana
- Church: Roman Catholic Church
- Diocese: Alexandria in Louisiana
- In office: 1946 to 1973
- Predecessor: Daniel Francis Desmond
- Successor: Lawrence Preston Joseph Graves

Orders
- Ordination: July 25, 1918 by John Shaw
- Consecration: February 25, 1947 by Joseph Rummel

Personal details
- Born: October 29, 1894 Rodney, Mississippi, US
- Died: January 20, 1987 (aged 92) Alexandria, Louisiana, US
- Education: St. Joseph Seminary; American College at Louvain
- Motto: Vivat Jesus (Jesus lives)

Charles Pasquale Greco (October 29, 1894 – January 20, 1987) was an American Catholic prelate who served as bishop of Alexandria in Louisiana from 1946 to 1973.

== Biography ==
=== Early life ===
Charles Greco was born on October 29, 1894, in Rodney, Mississippi, to Italian immigrants, Frank and Carmela (née Testa) Greco. He attended St. Joseph Seminary in Covington, Louisiana, before studying at the American College at Louvain in Belgium and the University of Fribourg in Switzerland.

Greco was ordained to the priesthood for the Archdiocese of New Orleans by Archbishop John Shaw on July 25, 1918. Greco served as vicar general of the archdiocese and pastor of Our Lady of Lourdes Parish in New Orleans.

=== Bishop of Alexandria ===
On January 15, 1946, Greco was appointed the sixth bishop of Alexandria by Pope Pius XII. He received his episcopal consecration on February 25, 1946, from Archbishop Joseph Rummel, with Bishops Richard Gerow and Thomas Toolen serving as co-consecrators.

During his tenure, Greco established 33 parishes, over 125 churches and chapels, 100 convents and rectories, and sevem health-care facilities. In 1954, he also founded St. Mary's Residential Training School in Clarks, Louisiana, and Holy Angels Residential Facility for Individuals with Intellectual and Developmental Disabilities in Shreveport, Louisiana.He was named supreme chaplain of the national Knights of Columbus in 1961.

He attended all four sessions of the Second Vatican Council in Rome between 1962 and 1965.

=== Retirement and legacy ===
On May 10, 1973, Pope Paul VI accepted Greco's resignation as bishop of Alexandria. Charles Greco died in Alexandria on January 20, 1987, at age 92. Greco is honored with a statue of himself standing between two children at St. Mary's Residential Training School in Alexandria.

== See also ==
Catholic Church titles
Preceded by Daniel Francis Desmond	Bishop of Alexandria in Louisiana; 1946—1973	Succeeded by Lawrence Preston Joseph Graves
