= Catholic High School for Boys (Little Rock, Arkansas) =

Little Rock Catholic High School for Boys
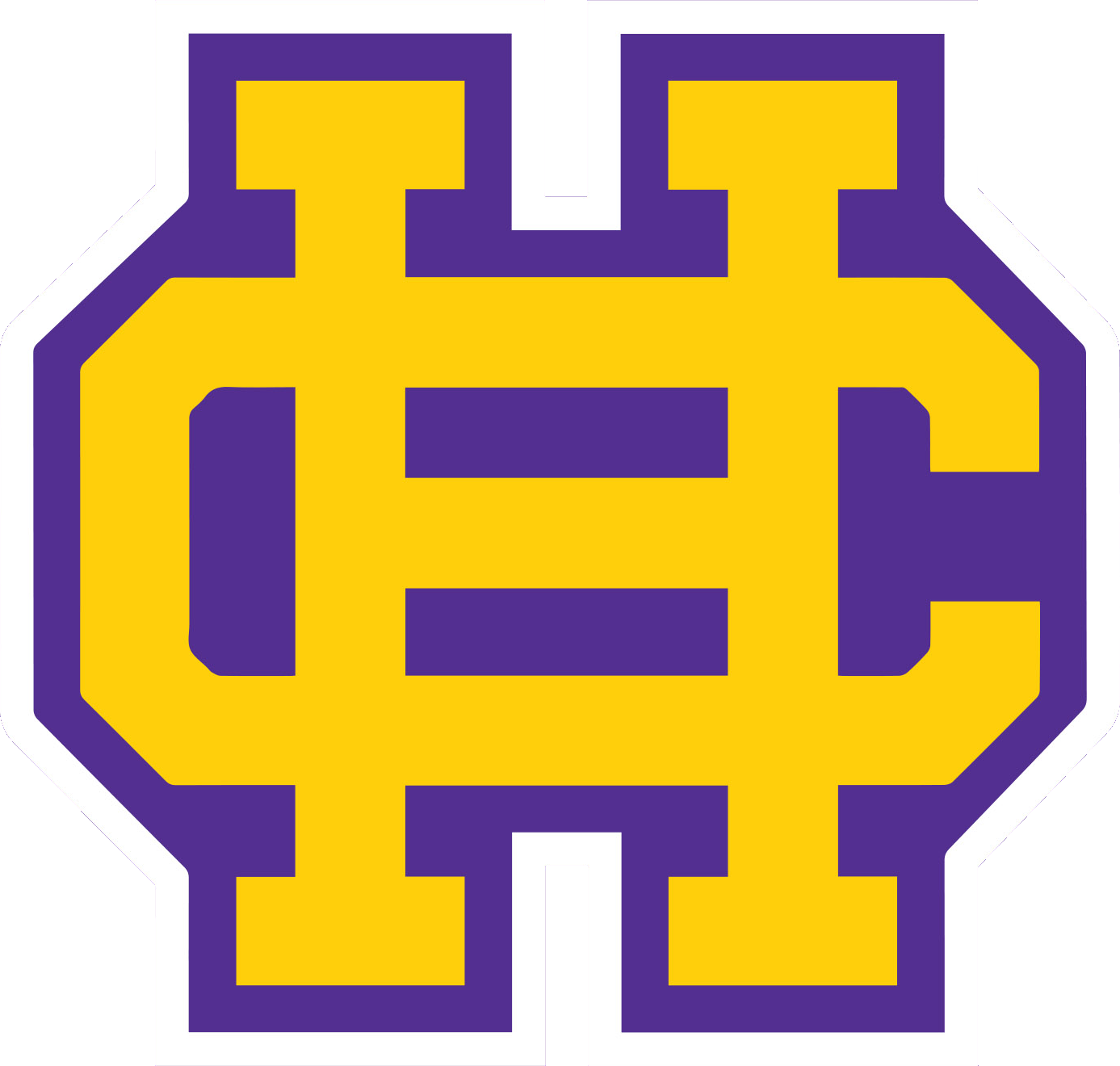

Location
- 6300 Father Tribou St. Little Rock, Arkansas 72205; United States; 34°45′21″N 92°20′39″W

Information
- Type: Private, All-Male
- Motto: Virtus in Veritate (Latin) (Manliness in the Truth)
- Religious affiliation: Roman Catholic
- Established: 1930 (96 years ago)
- Founder: Bishop John B. Morris
- Sister school: Mount St. Mary Academy
- CEEB code: 041420
- NCES School ID: 00047854
- Rector: Msgr. Lawrence Frederick
- Principal: Matthew Dempsey
- Head of school: Steve Straessle
- Faculty: 55
- Grades: 9–12
- Enrollment: 754
- Campus: Urban
- Colors: Purple and gold
- Mascot: Rockets
- Accreditation: Arkansas Nonpublic School Accrediting Association
- Newspaper: Rocket Times
- Yearbook: The Rocket
- Affiliation: Roman Catholic Diocese of Little Rock
- Website: www.lrchs.org

Little Rock Catholic High School for Boys is a private, Catholic high school located in Little Rock, Arkansas, established in 1930.

== Activities ==
=== Extracurricular activities ===
The Catholic High School for Boys mascot is The Rockets, with purple and gold serving as its school colors.

=== Athletics ===
The Little Rock Catholic Rockets compete in the 7A Classification, which is the state's largest classification, administered by the Arkansas Activities Association. The Rockets compete in the 7A/6A Central Conference.

Fall	Winter	Spring
Fall Football Girls Field hockey Girls Flag Football Girls & Boys Cross Country Girls Volleyball Girls Golf Girls Tennis Boys Water Polo	Girls & Boys Basketball Girls Water Polo Soccer Wrestling Cheer bowling	Boys Tennis Football Boys Volleyball Girls & Boys Swimming Boys Golf Boys Baseball Girls Softball Track & Field Beach Volleyball

The Rockets have won the following state championships:

- Baseball: 1971, 1972
- Football: 1984, 1985, 2024
- Golf: 1964, 1965, 1967, 1985, 1989, 1990, 1991, 2006, 2021, 2024 (boys)
- Swimming and diving: 1962, 1977, 1980, 1982, 1983, 1984, 1987, 1989, 2002, 2003, 2004
- Soccer: 2002, 2007, 2009, 2010, 2011 (7A)
- Wrestling: 2014 (7A/6A)
- Tennis: 1968, 1971, 1973, 1974, 1975, 1976, 1980, 1981, 1983, 1985, 1986, 1987, 1991, 1992, 1999, 2015, 2016, 2017, 2018, 2019 (boys)
- Basketball: 2008 (7A)
- Quiz Bowl state champions: 2009
- Chess state champions: 2021

=== Clubs and traditions ===
In addition to athletic competition, Catholic sponsors a United States Marine Corps JROTC unit, which participates in Drill, Physical Fitness, Academic, and Cyber Patriot competitions, as well as participating in Quiz Bowl, debate, and speech competitions.

- The MCJROTC unit was founded by Major General Sidney S. McMath (USMC), former Governor of Arkansas, on 27 November 1967, when General Clifford B. Drake (USMC) officially presented the unit colors during Charter Day ceremonies. The early cadets who attended the program were referred to as "Sid's Kids". The unit includes female cadets from Mount St. Mary Academy. The unit as a whole has received many awards, including:
- Designated Naval Honor School, Program with Distinction (2009, 2010, 2011, 2012, 2013, 2014, 2015, 2016)
- Marine Corps Reserve Association Junior ROTC Outstanding Unit Award (1982)
- Marine Corps Reserve Association, Region V Best Marine Corps Unit (2010, 2011, 2012, 2014, 2015, 2016)
- JROTC National Physical Fitness Champions ( 2010, 2011, 2012, 2015, 2016, 2017)
- JROTC Academic Bowl, Best MCJROTC Academic team (2016)
- The JROTC program sponsors many different teams, such as: Academic, Armed Drill, Armed Exhibition Drill, Rifle, Cyber Patriot, and Physical Fitness.

== Notable alumni ==
Name	Graduation Class	Best Known For
Pat Seerey	1941	Former MLB player for Cleveland Indians and Chicago White Sox
Gil Gerard	1961	Actor and star of television's Buck Rogers in the 25th Century
Dr. John C. York	1967	Cancer researcher and co-chairman of San Francisco 49ers
French Hill	1975	Current United States Congressman
Stephen Jones	1983	Former Arkansas Razorbacks football player, son of Dallas Cowboys owner Jerry Jones, and current executive vice president, CEO, and director of player personnel for the team
Jerry Jones Jr.	1988	Son of Dallas Cowboys owner Jerry Jones and chief sales and marketing officer and executive vice president of the Dallas Cowboys
Jimmy Kremers	1984	Former MLB player for Atlanta Braves
Ron Whittaker	1990	Professional golfer on the PGA Tour
Jake Bequette	2007	Former Arkansas Razorbacks football and New England Patriots player
