= Tontitown, Arkansas =

- City
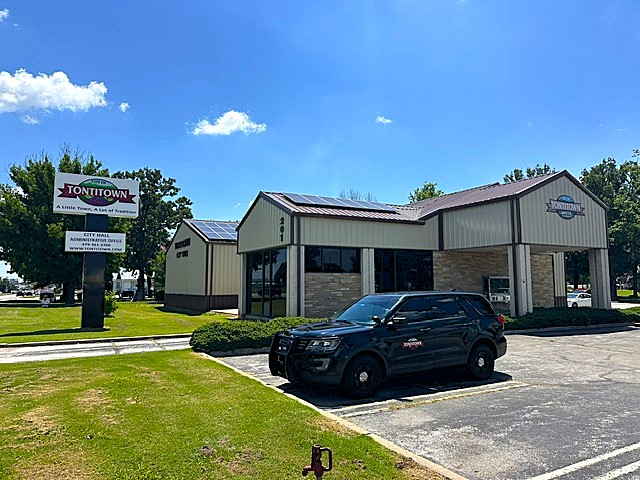
- Tontitown City Hall in July of 2026

- Logo

- Location of Tontitown in Washington County, Arkansas.
- Coordinates: 36°09′51″N 94°14′44″W
- Country: United States
- State: Arkansas
- County: Washington
- Settled: 1898
- Incorporated (city): 1909
- Founded by: Pietro Bandini
- Named after: Henri de Tonti

Government
  - Type: Mayor/Council
  - Mayor: Angela Russell

Area
  - Total: 18.05 sq mi (46.74 km^{2})
  - Land: 17.91 sq mi (46.39 km^{2})
  - Water: 0.14 sq mi (0.35 km^{2})
- Elevation: 1,296 ft (395 m)

Population (2020)
  - Total: 4,301
  - Estimate (2025): 8,046 ▲
  - Density: 240.1/sq mi (92.71/km^{2})
- Time zone: UTC-6 (Central (CST))
  - Summer (DST): UTC-5 (CDT)
- ZIP code: 72770
- Area code: 479
- FIPS code: 05-69740
- GNIS feature ID: 2405595
- Website: Tontitown.com

Tontitown is a city in northern Washington County, Arkansas, United States. As of the 2020 census, Tontitown had a population of 4,301. The community is located in the Ozark Mountains and was founded by Italian settlers in 1898. Known for its grapes and wines, Tontitown has hosted the Tontitown Grape Festival continuously since 1898. It is part of the Northwest Arkansas region, serving as a bedroom community for larger neighbors Fayetteville and Springdale. The town experienced a 160% growth in population between the 2000 and 2010 censuses.

== History ==
Led by Catholic priest Pietro Bandini, who eventually became mayor of the city, Italian settlers working on Sunnyside Plantation in the Arkansas Delta moved to northwest Arkansas and found the climate and terrain similar to their native Northern Italy. Tontitown was settled in 1898 and named for Italian explorer Henri de Tonti.

The 35 initial families settled on 10 acres (4.0 ha) plots, planting gardens and vineyards. In 1909, the community incorporated, having grown to 1,400 acres (570 ha). Some residents resisted and resented the Italian influx, which largely spoke Italian and remained insulated. After threats and arson of barns and the school, Bandini confronted a group to stop the terrorization of the nascent Tontitown community.

The Tontitown grapes eventually became a major crop in Washington County following the construction of a Welch Company plant in Springdale near the railroad. The area also grew apples, blackberries, peaches, strawberries, and tomatoes for canning in Springdale.

== Demographics ==
Historical population
Census	Pop.	Note	%±
1910	222		—
1920	235		5.9%
1930	188		−20.0%
1940	189		0.5%
1950	203		7.4%
1960	209		3.0%
1970	426		103.8%
1980	615		44.4%
1990	460		−25.2%
2000	942		104.8%
2010	2,460		161.1%
2020	4,301		74.8%
2025 (est.)	8,046	▲	87.1%
Encyclopedia of Arkansas; History and Culture

=== 2020 census ===
As of the 2020 census, Tontitown had a population of 4,301. The median age was 37.6 years. 25.8% of residents were under the age of 18 and 12.6% of residents were 65 years of age or older. For every 100 females there were 102.2 males, and for every 100 females age 18 and over there were 99.1 males age 18 and over.

33.0% of residents lived in urban areas, while 67.0% lived in rural areas.

There were 1,541 households in Tontitown, of which 40.2% had children under the age of 18 living in them. Of all households, 68.0% were married-couple households, 11.5% were households with a male householder and no spouse or partner present, and 15.6% were households with a female householder and no spouse or partner present. About 15.7% of all households were made up of individuals and 5.3% had someone living alone who was 65 years of age or older. There were 1,060 families residing in the city.

There were 1,627 housing units, of which 5.3% were vacant. The homeowner vacancy rate was 1.4% and the rental vacancy rate was 2.7%.

Tontitown racial composition
Race	Number	Percentage
White (non-Hispanic)	3,372	78.4%
Black or African American (non-Hispanic)	80	1.86%
Native American	44	1.02%
Asian	102	2.37%
Pacific Islander	30	0.7%
Other/Mixed	278	6.46%
Hispanic or Latino	395	9.18%

=== 2010 census ===
As of the 2010 census the ethnic and racial composition of the population was 92.0% non-Hispanic white, 0.3% African-American, 0.5% Native American, 0.6% Asian, 2.4% reporting two or more races and 5.7% Hispanic.

=== 2000 census ===
At the 2000 census there were 942 people in 351 households, including 273 families, in the city. The population density was 134.2 inhabitants per square mile (51.8/km^{2}). There were 368 housing units at an average density of 52.4 per square mile (20.2/km^{2}). The racial makeup of the city was 96.28% White, 1.70% Native American, 0.11% Pacific Islander, 0.85% from other races, and 1.06% from two or more races. 2.23%. were Hispanic or Latino of any race.

Of the 351 households 37.9% had children under the age of 18 living with them, 66.4% were married couples living together, 7.4% had a female householder with no husband present, and 22.2% were non-families. 18.5% of households were one person and 9.1% were one person aged 65 or older. The average household size was 2.68 and the average family size was 3.07. Tontitown has seen a very rapid growth in recent years as indicated by a 160% growth in population between the 2000 and 2010 censuses.

The age distribution was 27.0% under the age of 18, 6.5% from 18 to 24, 29.7% from 25 to 44, 24.6% from 45 to 64, and 12.2% 65 or older. The median age was 37 years. For every 100 females, there were 100.0 males. For every 100 females age 18 and over, there were 97.1 males. Tonitown is part of the Fayetteville, Springdale, Rogers metro area.

The median household income was $43,750 and the median family income was $47,589. Males had a median income of $32,917 versus $25,750 for females. The per capita income for the city was $20,058. About 4.9% of families and 8.7% of the population were below the poverty line, including 10.7% of those under age 18 and 6.9% of those age 65 or over.

== Culture ==
The city is known regionally for the Tontitown Grape Festival. Started in 1898 as a harvest festival to celebrate the settlement's establishment, a spaghetti and fried chicken dinner continues the tradition.

Many original families remain in Tontitown or nearby Springdale.

== Education ==
It is in the Springdale School District.

Jim Rollins Elementary School a.k.a. Jim D. Rollins School of Innovation, a part of the Springdale district, is in Tontitown. It uses an open classroom instructional model from New Zealand. Planning for the school began circa 2018 In October 2020 the district began building the school, which opened in fall 2021, though with some construction left unfinished. The dedication occurred in 2022. The school was named after a person who served as the superintendent of the Springdale district.

In 2022 much of Tontitown is zoned to Jim D. Rollins Elementary in Tontitown (areas south of 412) and Shaw Elementary School in Springdale (areas north of 412), with some areas in the east zoned to Bernice Young Elementary School. All of Tontitown is zoned to Hellstern Middle School, Central Junior High School, and Har-Ber High School, all in Springdale.

Most of the community, in 2006, was zoned to Bernice Young Elementary School, with a portion zoned to Walker Elementary School. Tontitown was divided between Hellstern and Helen Tyson middle schools, and Central and Southwest junior high schools. All portions were zoned to Har-Ber.

Ozark Catholic Academy, a Roman Catholic high school, is in Tontitown.

== Transportation ==
As of 2023, there is no fixed route transit service in Tontitown. Ozark Regional Transit operates bus services nearby in Springdale, but only demand-response service in Tontitown.

== Notable people ==
- Pietro Bandini (1852–1917), town founder and mayor
- Albert Lewis Fletcher, former Roman Catholic Bishop of Little Rock from 1947 to 1972, resided in Tontitown during his childhood.
- The Duggar family, reality TV stars, reside in Tontitown.

== See also ==
- St. Joseph Catholic Church (Tontitown, Arkansas)
- Tontitown School Building
