= Felipe de Jesús Estévez =

Cuban American Catholic prelate (born 1946)

His Excellency, The Most Reverend Felipe de Jesús Estévez
- Bishop Emeritus of St. Augustine
- Church: Catholic Church
- Diocese: St. Augustine
- Appointed: April 27, 2011
- Installed: June 2, 2011
- Retired: May 24, 2022
- Predecessor: Victor Galeone
- Successor: Erik T. Pohlmeier
- Previous posts: Auxiliary Bishop of Miami & Titular Bishop of Kearney (2004–2011)

Orders
- Ordination: May 30, 1970 by Leo Aloysius Pursley
- Consecration: January 7, 2004 by John Favalora, Pedro Claro Meurice Estiu, and Thomas Olmsted

Personal details
- Born: February 5, 1946 (age 80) Matanzas, Cuba
- Education: Montreal University; Pontifical Gregorian University
- Motto: In finem dilexit eos (Latin for 'He loved them to the end')
- Styles
- Reference style: His Excellency; The Most Reverend
- Spoken style: Your Excellency
- Religious style: Bishop

Felipe de Jesús Estévez (born February 5, 1946) is a Cuban-born American Catholic prelate who served as bishop of St. Augustine in Florida from 2011 to 2022. Estévez previously served as an auxiliary bishop of the Archdiocese of Miami in Florida from 2003 to 2011.

== Biography ==
=== Early life ===
Felipe Estévez was born in Pedro Betancourt, Matanzas, Cuba on February 6, 1946. He fled to the United States as a young man under Operation Peter Pan, a program to bring Cuban children to the United States. He is the second of three children (two boys and a girl) of Adriano and Estrella Estevez. Estévez studied at Montreal University in Montreal, Quebec, and received a Licentiate of Theology in 1970.

=== Priesthood ===
Estévez was ordained a priest by Bishop Leo Pursley for the Diocese of Matanzas in Cuba on May 30, 1970, in Fort Wayne, Indiana. Estévez was sent to Honduras, serving as associate pastor of Guascoran Parish in Guascoran, Honduras for one year. He became a faculty member in Honduras of the St. Joseph Seminary for one year and Our Lady of Suyapa Seminary for two years.

Returning to the United States in 1975, Estévez joined the faculty at St. Vincent de Paul Regional Seminary in Boynton Beach, Florida, serving there until 1977. In 1977, he received a Master's degree in Arts from Barry University in Miami Shores, Florida.

Estévez was incardinated, or transferred, into the Archdiocese of Miami on February 9, 1979. He then went to Rome to study at the Pontifical Gregorian University, receiving a Doctor of Sacred Theology degree in 1980. Estevez is fluent in Spanish, English, French, and Italian. After his return to Florida, he was appointed president/rector of St. Vincent de Paul, maintaining that role until 1986.

Estévez became the campus minister at Florida International University in Miami, Florida, in 1987. That same year, he was appointed pastor of St. Agatha Parish in Miami. Estévez left both positions in 2001 to become dean of spiritual formation at St. Vincent de Paul.

=== Auxiliary Bishop of Miami ===
Estévez was appointed by Pope John Paul II as an auxiliary bishop of Miami and titular bishop of Kearney on November 21, 2003. On January 7, 2004, he was consecrated at the Cathedral of St. Mary in Miami by Archbishop John Favalora. His co-consecrators were Archbishop Pedro Estiu and Bishop Thomas Olmsted. In 2010, Estévez was appointed vicar general for the archdiocese.

=== Bishop of St. Augustine ===
Pope Benedict XVI appointed Estévez as bishop of St. Augustine to succeed the retiring Bishop Victor Galeone on April 27, 2011 Estevez was installed at St. Joseph Catholic Church in Jacksonville, Florida. The installation was attended by over 2,000 lay people, deacons, priests, and bishops from around the country and was broadcast on EWTN.

Estévez initiated the first ecumenical vespers at the bishop-level in Florida in 2014, at the Cathedral Basilica of St. Augustine in St. Augustine. The service was attended by Protestant and Orthodox leaders, clergy, and lay people. He attended the installation of Bishop Robert Schaefer of the Evangelical Lutheran Church in America near Tampa, Florida. He collaborated with local Eastern Orthodox Christian leaders in support of the meeting between Pope Francis and Patriarch Bartholomew in Jerusalem on May 25, 2014.

On October 15, 2019, Estévez announced that the Shrine of Our Lady of La Leche, located in the Nombre de Dios mission in St. Augustine, had been designated by the US Conference of Catholic Bishops as a national shrine.

=== Retirement ===
On May 24, 2022, Pope Francis accepted Estévez's resignation as bishop of the Diocese of St. Augustine.

== Viewpoints ==
=== Abortion ===
On October 11, 2020, just before the 2020 US presidential election, Estévez asked Catholic voters to consider the church's opposition to abortion rights for women when selecting candidates. He called abortion the "preeminent human rights issue" of our time.

=== Capital punishment ===
On May 28, 2020, Estévez published a pastoral letter in which he condemned the use of capital punishment in Florida. He stated:

We don't want anyone in society to be in danger because of these criminals, but we don't think that death is the answer. Killing them because they have killed would perpetuate the cycle of violence."

=== Immigration ===
On June 19, 2019, Estévez said we must show compassion and acknowledge the dignity of undocumented immigrants in the United States and called for reform of the U.S. immigration system.

Catholic Church titles
Preceded by Victor Galeone	Bishop of St. Augustine; 2011–2022	Succeeded by Erik T. Pohlmeier
Preceded by –	Auxiliary Bishop of Miami; 2004–2011	Succeeded by –
