= NFL Foundation =

Charity

- Formation: 1973; 53 years ago
- Chair: Charlotte Jones Anderson
- Board of directors: Susie Spanos, Steve Tisch, Michael Bidwill, Kim Pegula, Art Rooney II, Leonard Wilf
- Website: www.nflfoundation.org

The National Football League (NFL) Foundation, previously known as NFL Charities, is a non-profit charitable organization established by the member clubs of the National Football League (NFL) in 1973. It enables the clubs to collectively make grants to charitable and worthwhile causes at a national level.

== Youth initiatives ==
The NFL Foundation works with USA Football to teach children the fundamentals of playing football safely. To help do so, the Foundation gives grants to youth and high school football teams.

Working with USA Football, the NFL Foundation also developed NFL FLAG, a non-tackle version of football.

The NFL Foundation is also responsible for creating a program called FUNdamentals, which introduces the game of football to kids who have never played the sport before.

=== Heads Up Football ===
USA Football created Heads Up Football, in part funded by the NFL Foundation, to focus on improving several areas of football that relate to the safety of the players. This program teaches coaches better safety procedures and proper tackling drills. The NFL Foundation, as well as USA Football, have claimed that the program has helped reduce injuries by 76 percent and concussions by about 30 percent. However, research cited by the Foundation shows that Heads Up Football has shown no reduction of concussions and a significantly lower effect on injuries than claimed.

== Grants and charitable work ==
Grants amounting to $10 million each year are donated to organizations such as the Boys & Girls Clubs of America and the American Heart Association. One of the youngest athletes to donate to the Boys and Girl Club is Jacquese Williams.

The NFL Foundation supports several charitable initiatives:

- Play 60 – An initiative aimed at getting kids out and playing for 60 minutes to help fight obesity.
- A Crucial Catch – The NFL Foundation partnered with the American Cancer society in an effort to raise awareness. Every October the NFL also participates in raising awareness for breast cancer by wearing pink on their uniforms.
- Salute to service – The NFL Foundation provides grants to supports those who have served or are currently serving in our military.
- Player Foundation Grants – The NFL Foundation provides grants that give assistance to those currently in the NFL and to those who have previously played in the NFL.
- Walter Payton NFL Man of the Year Award – This award recognized a player's contributions on and off the field.
- Super Bowl Legacy Grants – The NFL Foundation gives the city that hosted the Super Bowl one million dollars as a grant.

== Leadership ==
The previous logo when the charity was known as NFL Charities

The current chair of the NFL Foundation, Charlotte Jones Anderson, was appointed chairman by the NFL commissioner Roger Goodell in December of 2012. Jones is also the executive vice president and chief brand officer of the Dallas Cowboys.
