= Charlotte Jones Anderson =

American football executive (born 1966)

- Jones in 2026
- Born: Charlotte Jones; July 26, 1966 (age 60); Little Rock, Arkansas, U.S.
- Education: Stanford University (BS)
- Occupations: Executive vice president and chief brand officer of the Dallas Cowboys
- Spouse: David Anderson (1991–2019; divorced)
- Children: 3
- Parent: Jerry Jones
- Relatives: Jerry Jones Jr. (brother); Stephen Jones (brother)

Charlotte Jones Anderson (born July 26, 1966) is an American businesswoman and football executive. She is the executive vice president and chief brand officer of the Dallas Cowboys. Jones was appointed chairman of the Salvation Army's National Advisory Board in 2010 and is the first woman to ever serve in that role. In 2012, Jones was named chairperson of the NFL Foundation and is responsible for leading philanthropic efforts in player care, youth football, and medical research. Jones is the first woman to serve in this capacity for a National Football League charitable institution, and the first woman to represent club ownership as leader of a major professional sports league foundation.

== Biography ==
A native of Little Rock, Arkansas, Jones is a 1988 graduate of Stanford University where she earned a B.S. degree in human biology. Jones lives in Dallas, Texas, with her three children from her ex-husband David "Shy" Anderson to whom she was married from 1991 until their divorce in 2019. She is the daughter of Dallas Cowboys owner Jerry Jones and the sister of Cowboys executives Stephen Jones and Jerry Jones Jr.

In September 2013, Jones was named one of SportsBusiness Journal's 2013 Game Changers as a Team Leader. In the 2024 Netflix television series America's Sweethearts: Dallas Cowboys Cheerleaders, Jones and the Dallas Cowboys were criticized for exploiting the Dallas Cowboys Cheerleaders and justifying low pay.

Before coming to the Cowboys, Jones oversaw the office and legislative staff of U.S. Representative Tommy F. Robinson (R-Arkansas) as chief of staff from 1989 to 1990. She resigned shortly after Robinson began his 1990 bid for Arkansas governor and when her father endorsed Robinson's opponent, Sheffield Nelson.

She oversees all strategies and applications surrounding the team’s brand as it is presented to fans world-wide, and she is in charge of the marketing department of the Cowboys which includes the Dallas Cowboys Cheerleaders and the mascot Rowdy. Both entities report to Jones. Jones participated in the Forbes 9th Annual CMO Summit in Miami.

Jones engineered the Dallas Cowboys' collaboration with Victoria's Secret to launch the first Victoria's Secret PINK store inside a professional stadium or arena.

Jones was announced as the chairperson of the 2014 Final Four, which took place in April 2014. Jones was responsible for Cowboys Stadium playing host to Super Bowl XLV, the 2010 NBA All Star Game, and the annual AT&T Cotton Bowl Classic.

On June 26, 2016, Jones was named as the 89th most important person in the National Football League by USA Today.
