= Albert Lewis Fletcher =

His Excellency, The Most Reverend Albert Lewis Fletcher
- Bishop of Little Rock titular bishop of Samos
- Church: Roman Catholic Church
- See: Diocese of Little Rock
- Installed: 1920
- Term ended: 1972
- Predecessor: John Baptist Morris
- Successor: Andrew Joseph McDonald

Orders
- Ordination: June 4, 1920 by John Baptist Morris
- Consecration: April 25, 1940 by Amleto Giovanni Cicognani

Personal details
- Born: October 28, 1896 Little Rock, Arkansas, US
- Died: December 6, 1979 (aged 83) Little Rock
- Buried: Saint Andrew's Catholic Cathedral
- Parents: Thomas Fletcher; Helen (née Wehr)
- Education: Little Rock College; St. John Home Missions Seminary; University of Chicago
- Motto: "God is With Us"

Styles of Albert Fletcher
- Reference style: The Most Reverend
- Spoken style: Your Excellency
- Religious style: Monsignor
- Posthumous style: none

Albert Lewis Fletcher (October 28, 1896 – December 6, 1979) was an American prelate of the Roman Catholic Church. He served as bishop of the Diocese of Little Rock in Arkansas from 1946 to 1972. He previously served as an auxiliary bishop of the same diocese from 1939 to 1946.

== Biography ==
=== Early life ===
Albert Fletcher was born on October 28, 1896, in Little Rock, Arkansas, to Thomas and Helen (née Wehr) Fletcher. His parents were both converts to Catholicism; his father was originally an Episcopalian and his mother a Lutheran. He and his family moved to Paris, Arkansas, a few months after his birth, then to Tontitown and Mena, both in Arkansas. In 1912, Fletcher entered Little Rock College in North Little Rock, obtaining a Bachelor of Arts degree in chemistry in 1916.

=== Priesthood ===
After completing his theological studies at St. John Home Missions Seminary, Fletcher was ordained to the priesthood for the Diocese of Little Rock by Bishop John Morris on June 4, 1920 in Little Rock. The diocese then assigned Fletcher as an assistant professor of chemistry and biology at Little Rock College. In 1922 he earned a Master of Science degree from the University of Chicago. After returning to Little Rock, he was named president of Little Rock College in 1923.

Fletcher in 1925 started teaching dogmatic theology and canon law at St. John Seminary (1925–1929). He was named chancellor (1926–1933) and vicar general (1933–1946) of the diocese. The Vatican elevated Fletcher to the rank of papal chamberlain in 1929 and a domestic prelate in 1934.

=== Auxiliary Bishop and Bishop of Little Rock ===
On December 11, 1939, Fletcher was appointed auxiliary bishop of Little Rock and titular bishop of Samos by Pope Pius XII. He received his episcopal consecration at the Cathedral of St. Andrew in Little Rock on April 25, 1940, from Archbishop Amleto Cicognani, with Bishops Jules Jeanmard and William O'Brien serving as co-consecrators. Fletcher became the first Catholic bishop from Arkansas, and his was the first consecration to be held in that state.

Fletcher was named bishop of Little Rock by Pius XII on December 7, 1946. Fletcher was a staunch advocate of racial desegregation, supporting the U.S. Supreme Court's 1954 ruling in Brown v. Board of Education. Fletcher reprimanded Arkansas Governor Orval Faubus for attempting to prevent desegregation at Little Rock Central High School in 1957. In a 1960 publication entitled "An Elementary Catholic Catechism on the Morality of Segregation and Racial Discrimination", Fletcher described segregation as "immoral ... unjust and uncharitable", and stated that it could even constitute mortal sin "when the act of racial prejudice committed is a serious infraction of the law of justice or charity".

From 1962 to 1965, Fletcher attended the Second Vatican Council in Rome. Although he inaugurated the liturgical use of the vernacular in his diocese as early as 1964, he did not follow the council's advice on creating permanent deacons, and closed St. John Seminary after some of its faculty publicly questioned the Church's stance on birth control and papal infallibility. Fletcher was also supported American participation in the Vietnam War and opposed giving amnesty to men who avoided conscription.

=== Retirement and legacy ===
On July 4, 1972, Pope Paul VI accepted Fletcher's resignation as bishop of Little Rock. Albert Fletcher died in Little Rock on December 6, 1979, at age 83. He is buried in the crypt of the Cathedral of Saint Andrew.

Catholic Church titles
Preceded by John Baptist Morris	Bishop of Little Rock; 1946–1972	Succeeded by Andrew Joseph McDonald
Preceded by –	Auxiliary Bishop of Little Rock; 1940–1946	Succeeded by –
