= Victor Galeone =

Catholic bishop (1935–2023)

His Excellency, The Most Reverend Victor Benito Galeone
- Bishop of St. Augustine
- Church: Catholic Church
- Archdiocese: Miami
- Diocese: St. Augustine
- Appointed: June 26, 2001
- Installed: August 21, 2001
- Term ended: April 27, 2011
- Predecessor: John J. Snyder
- Successor: Felipe de Jesus Estevez

Orders
- Ordination: December 18, 1960 by Martin John O'Connor
- Consecration: August 21, 2001 by John Favalora, John J. Snyder, and William Francis Malooly

Personal details
- Born: September 13, 1935 Philadelphia, Pennsylvania, U.S.
- Died: May 29, 2023 (aged 87) Catonsville, Maryland, U.S.
- Education: Pontifical Gregorian University; Loyola College in Maryland
- Motto: Love, joy, peace

Styles of Victor Benito Galeone
- Reference style: His Excellency; The Most Reverend
- Spoken style: Your Excellency
- Religious style: Bishop

Victor Benito Galeone (September 13, 1935 – May 29, 2023) was an American prelate of the Roman Catholic Church. He served as bishop of the Diocese of St. Augustine in Florida from 2001 to 2011.

== Biography ==
=== Early life ===
Victor Galeone was born in Philadelphia, Pennsylvania, on September 13, 1935, the son of Angelo and Rita Galeone and the fourth of five children. He attended St. Elizabeth of Hungary Parochial School in Baltimore, Maryland. After deciding to become a priest, Galeone in 1949 entered the minor seminary of St. Charles College in Catonsville, Maryland. Galeone was then sent to Rome to enter the Pontifical North American College and study at the Pontifical Gregorian University.

=== Priesthood ===
Galeone was ordained to the priesthood for the Archdiocese of Baltimore by Bishop Martin J. O’Connor in the chapel of the North American College on December 18, 1960. He received his Licentiate in Sacred Theology and Bachelor of Theology degree from the Gregorian University in 1961.

On his return to Baltimore in 1961, Galeone was assigned as an associate pastor in several parishes in the archdiocese. He started teaching at St. Paul Latin High School in Baltimore and soon became principal. Galeone received a Master of Education degree from Loyola College Maryland in Baltimore in 1969.

In 1970, Galeone traveled to Peru to serve a five year term as a missionary priest for the Missionary Society of St. James. In 1978, Galeone went back to Peru, serving there again as a missionary until 1985.

On returning to Baltimore, Galeone served as pastor in several archdiocese parishes. In 1989 to 1996, Galeone was appointed pastor of St. Thomas More Parish in Baltimore. In 1995, Pope John Paul II named Galeone as a prelate of honor, with the title of monsignor. After seven years at St. Thomas More, he was reassigned in 1996 as pastor of St. Agnes Parish in Catonsville, Maryland, his final assignment with the archdiocese. Galeone's archdiocesan positions included parochial vicar and memberships on the Priests Council, the College of Consultors and the national board of directors of the Holy Childhood Association.

=== Bishop of St. Augustine ===
On June 26, 2001, John Paul II appointed Galeone as bishop of St. Augustine. He was consecrated on August 21, 2001, in the Cathedral Basilica of St. Augustine. Archbishop John C. Favalora served as the principal consecrator with Bishop Snyder and Bishop W. Francis Malooly serving as the principal co-consecrators. Galeone's episcopal motto is "Love, Joy, Peace."

In 2003, a Florida woman wrote Galeone about being sexually abused when she was 11 years old by Reverend William Malone, a diocese priest. The woman had brought these same accusations in 1991 to Bishop John J. Snyder. The diocese had dismissed the accusations then as not being credible. After receiving her recent complaint, Galeone met with the woman, but never submitted the accusation to the Diocesan Review Board, nor contacted the local district attorney. This was despite the fact that the diocese was providing financial support for Malone's child by another victim. In 2018, Malone was added to a list of diocese priests with credible accusations of child sexual abuse.

Galeone was arguably one of the most outspoken orthodox bishops in the country. He had, on several occasions, strongly condemned birth control and politicians who support abortion rights for women. In 2016, Galeone removed Reverend Glenn Charest from his post as pastor of Holy Spirit Parish in Lake Wales, Florida. Charest had been arrested for solicitation to commit lewdness. He was arrested after soliciting oral sex from an undercover sheriff's deputy in a wooded area in Winter Haven. Charest had previously been removed in 2010 from Our Lady of the Star of the Sea Catholic Church in Ponte Vedra Beach.

=== Retirement and death ===
Galeone's letter of resignation as bishop of St. Augustine was accepted by Pope Benedict XVI on April 27, 2011. Galeone was succeeded by Bishop Felipe de Jesus Estevez in June 2011.Galeone died at St. Martin’s Home for the Aged in Catonsville, Maryland, on May 29, 2023, at age 87.

== Bibliography ==
- Galeone, Victor Benito (2014). Joyful good news : for young and old. Houston: Magnificat Institute Press. ISBN 978-0-9657125-7-6.

== See also ==
- Catholic Church hierarchy
- Catholic Church in the United States
- Historical list of the Catholic bishops of the United States
- List of Catholic bishops of the United States
- Lists of patriarchs, archbishops, and bishops

== Episcopal succession ==
Catholic Church titles
Preceded by John J. Snyder	Bishop of St. Augustine; 2001–2011	Succeeded by Felipe de Jesús Estévez
