= Andrew Joseph McDonald =

Catholic bishop

His Excellency, The Most Reverend Andrew Joseph McDonald
- Bishop of Little Rock
- Church: Roman Catholic Church
- See: Diocese of Little Rock
- Predecessor: Albert Fletcher
- Successor: J. Peter Sartain

Orders
- Ordination: May 8, 1948 by Emmet M. Walsh
- Consecration: September 5, 1972 by Thomas McDonough

Personal details
- Born: October 24, 1923 Savannah, Georgia, US
- Died: April 1, 2014 (aged 90) Palatine, Illinois, US
- Education: St. Charles College; St. Mary's Seminary; Catholic University of America; Pontifical Lateran University
- Motto: Ave crux (Hail the cross)

Styles of Andrew McDonald
- Reference style: The Most Reverend
- Spoken style: Your Excellency
- Religious style: Monsignor
- Posthumous style: not applicable

Andrew Joseph McDonald (October 24, 1923 – April 1, 2014) was an American prelate of the Catholic Church. He served as bishop of the Diocese of Little Rock in Arkansas from 1972 to 2000.

== Biography ==
=== Early life ===
The second youngest of 12 children, McDonald was born on October 24, 1923, in Savannah, Georgia, to James Bernard and Theresa (née McGrael) McDonald. After graduating from Marist School for Boys in Brookhaven, Georgia, he studied at St. Charles College in Catonsville, Maryland. McDonald then attended St. Mary's Seminary in Baltimore, Maryland, obtaining a Licentiate of Sacred Theology (1948).

=== Priesthood ===
McDonald was ordained to the priesthood at the Cathedral of Saint John the Baptist in Savannah, Georgia, for the Diocese of Savannah by Bishop Emmet M. Walsh on May 8, 1948. He then attended Catholic University of America in Washington, D.C. McDonald completed his studies in Rome at the Pontifical Lateran University, earning a Doctor of Canon Law in 1951.

Upon his return to the South Carolina, the diocese named McDonald as chancellor, as an official of the Marriage Tribunal, and as curate of a parish in Port Wentworth, Georgia. The Vatican elevated him to the rank of papal chamberlain in 1956 and domestic prelate in 1959. From 1963 to 1972, McDonald served as pastor of Blessed Sacrament Parish in Savannah; he also served as vicar general of the diocese starting in 1967.

=== Bishop of Little Rock ===
On July 4, 1972, McDonald was appointed the fifth bishop of Little Rock by Pope Paul VI. He received his episcopal consecration at the Cathedral of Saint John the Baptist on September 5, 1972, from Archbishop Thomas McDonough, with Archbishop Philip Hannan and Bishop Gerard Frey serving as co-consecrators. McDonald was formally installed as bishop in Little Rock two days later.

Unlike his predecessor, Bishop Albert Fletcher, McDonald followed the suggestion of the Second Vatican Council in instituting permanent deacons, largely because of the diocese's shortage of priests. McDonald opposed the U.S. Supreme Court's 1973 legalization of abortion rights for women in Roe v. Wade; he later established an anti-abortion office in the diocesan curia and led the March for Life each January in Little Rock. In 1982, McDonald invited Mother Teresa to open a home for single mothers in Little Rock.

A dedicated ecumenist, McDonald reached out to other denominations in Arkansas throughout his tenure, and once assisted in promoting a Billy Graham crusade at War Memorial Stadium in Little Rock in 1989. In 1990, McDonald condemned the execution of John Swindler by the State of Arkansas. Swindler had been convicted of murdering a police officer in Fort Smith. McDonald became known for his affable personality, his involvement with the laity, and his personal interest in those Catholics under his jurisdiction.

=== Retirement and legacy ===
On January 4, 2000, Pope John Paul II accepted McDonald's resignation as bishop of Little Rock. Afterwards, McDonald lived outside of Chicago, Illinois, where he served as chaplain for the Little Sisters of the Poor. McDonald died in Palatine, Illinois, on April 1, 2014, at age 90.

Catholic Church titles
Preceded by Albert Lewis Fletcher	Bishop of Little Rock; 1972–2000	Succeeded by J. Peter Sartain
