= John Joseph Boardman =

American prelate

- Auxiliary Bishop of Brooklyn
- Church: Roman Catholic Church
- See: Roman Catholic Diocese of Brooklyn
- In office: 1952-1977

Orders
- Ordination: May 21, 1921
- Consecration: June 11, 1952

Personal details
- Born: November 7, 1893 Brooklyn, New York, U.S.
- Died: July 16, 1978 (aged 84)
- Denomination: Roman Catholic Church

John Joseph Boardman (1893 - 1978) was an American prelate of the Roman Catholic Church who served as Auxiliary bishop of the Diocese of Brooklyn, New York, and Titular Bishop of Gunela.

== Biography ==
Boardman was born on November 7, 1893, in Brooklyn and ordained a parish priest on May 21, 1921, aged 27. The Principal Consecrator was Archbishop Thomas Molloy.

On March 28, 1952, aged 58, he was appointed as Auxiliary Bishop of Brooklyn and Titular Bishop of Gunela. He received his episcopal consecration on June 11, 1952. In 1959, Bishop Boardman was sent from Holy Name Parish where he was pastor, and appointed as pastor of Our Lady of Angels in Bay Ridge, Brooklyn.

In October 1977 he retired as Auxiliary Bishop of Brooklyn and died on July 16, 1978, at the age of 84 as Auxiliary Bishop Emeritus.

He was a priest for 57 years and a bishop for 26 years.

Catholic Church titles
Preceded by –	Auxiliary Bishop of Brooklyn; 1952–1977	Succeeded by –
