= Mount St. Mary Academy (Little Rock, Arkansas) =

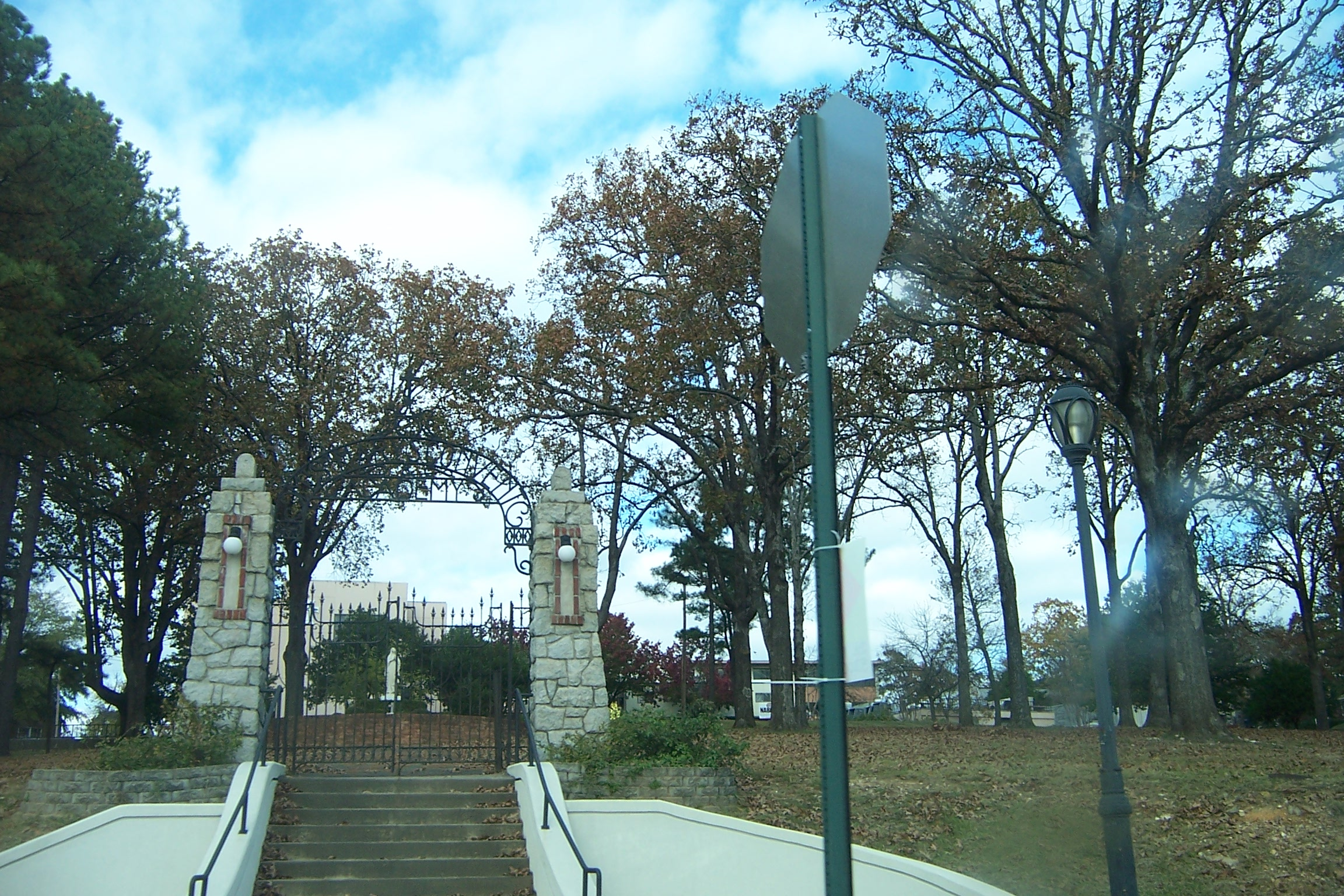
- Entrance Gate to Mount St. Mary Academy

Location
- 3224 Kavanaugh Boulevard; Little Rock, Pulaski County, Arkansas 72205; United States; 34°45′39″N 92°19′46″W

Information
- School type: Private, college-preparatory all-girls Catholic high school
- Religious affiliation: Roman Catholic
- Founded: 1851 (175 years ago)
- Founder: Sisters of Mercy
- Status: Open
- Oversight: Sisters of Mercy
- CEEB code: 041440
- NCES School ID: 00047978
- Chairperson: Donna Chachere
- Head of school: Sara Jones. Ed.S.
- Faculty: 33.5 (on an FTE basis)
- Grades: 9–12
- Gender: Female
- Enrollment: 496 (2017-2018)
- Student to teacher ratio: 14:4
- Classes offered: Regular College Preparatory; Honors; Advanced Placement (AP)
- Campus size: 10 acres (40,000 m^{2})
- Campus type: Midsize city
- Colors: Purple, white, grey
- Athletics conference: 6A Central (Arkansas Activities Association)
- Team name: Belles
- Accreditation: Arkansas Nonpublic School Accrediting Association (ANSAA)
- Newspaper: The Mount
- Yearbook: The Mercian Times
- Affiliation: Mercy Education System of the Americas (MESA); National Catholic Educational Association (NCEA); National Association of Independent Schools (NAIS); National Association for College Admissions Counseling (NACAC); Southern Association for College Admissions Counseling (SACAC); The College Board
- Alumni: Nearly 9,000
- Website: www.mtstmary.edu

Mount St. Mary Academy is a private, Roman Catholic, all-girls high school, serving grades 9 through 12, in the Hillcrest neighborhood of Little Rock, Arkansas, United States. It is an all-female institution, and has an all-male brother school, Catholic High School for Boys. It is located within the Diocese of Little Rock. Having been founded in 1851, it is the oldest high school in Arkansas.

== History ==
Mount St. Mary Academy was founded by the Sisters of Mercy in 1851 at Seventh and Louisiana Streets in downtown Little Rock. The school moved to the present Hillcrest location in 1908 after outgrowing her Louisiana Street location. The 10-acre (40,000 m^{2}) site was purchased with funds from the sale of the downtown property and contributions from local residents and landowners.

== Academics ==
Mount St. Mary Academy students complete a curriculum that is aligned with the Smart Core curriculum developed by the Arkansas Department of Education (ADE), which requires 22 units to graduate; the typical Mount St. Mary student completes 28 units in regular and honor coursework and exams. Mount St. Mary Academy began offering the International Baccalaureate (IB) Diploma Programme in January 2000; however, in the 2016–2017 year, the school started offering the Advanced Placement (AP) program instead. The last class to receive an IB education was the class of 2017.

Mount St. Mary maintains affiliations with the National Catholic Educational Association (NCEA) and the Mercy Education System of the Americas. Academic Departments also hold membership in educational professional organizations such as the National Council of Teachers of English (NCTE), the National Council of Teachers of Mathematics (NCTM), the American Counseling Association, the National Association of Secondary School Principals, and the College Board. Mount St. Mary is accredited by the Arkansas Nonpublic School Accrediting Association.

Student publications for journalism students include The Mercian Times (yearbook) and The Mount (newspaper).

== Extracurricular activities ==
The Mount St. Mary Academy mascot is The Belles with purple, grey and white as its school colors.

=== Athletics ===
The Mount St. Mary Belles compete in the state's largest classification, administered by the Arkansas Activities Association. The Belles compete in the 6A Central Conference. Interscholastic activities include: basketball, bowling, cross country running, golf, soccer, softball, swimming and diving, track and field, and volleyball.

The Belles have won the following state championships:

- Swimming and diving 11 state championships between 1953 and 2008
- Golf 1978, 1983, 1998, 1999, 2023, 2024, 2025
- Tennis 1975, 1980, 1981, 1984, 1998, 1999, 2000, 2002, 2008

== Notes ==
- Hayes, Jan. History of Mount St. Mary's Academy, Little Rock, Arkansas, 1851–1987. St. Louis, MO: Sisters of Mercy, 1987.
- Lester, Jim, and Judy Lester. Greater Little Rock: A Pictorial History. Norfolk, VA: The Donning Company, 1986.
- Woods, James M. Mission and Memory: A History of the Catholic Church in Arkansas. Little Rock: August House, 1992.
