= Diocese of Little Rock =

Latin Catholic ecclesiastical jurisdiction in Arkansas, USA

Coordinates: 34°44′10″N 92°19′52″W

Diocese of Little Rock Dioecesis Petriculana
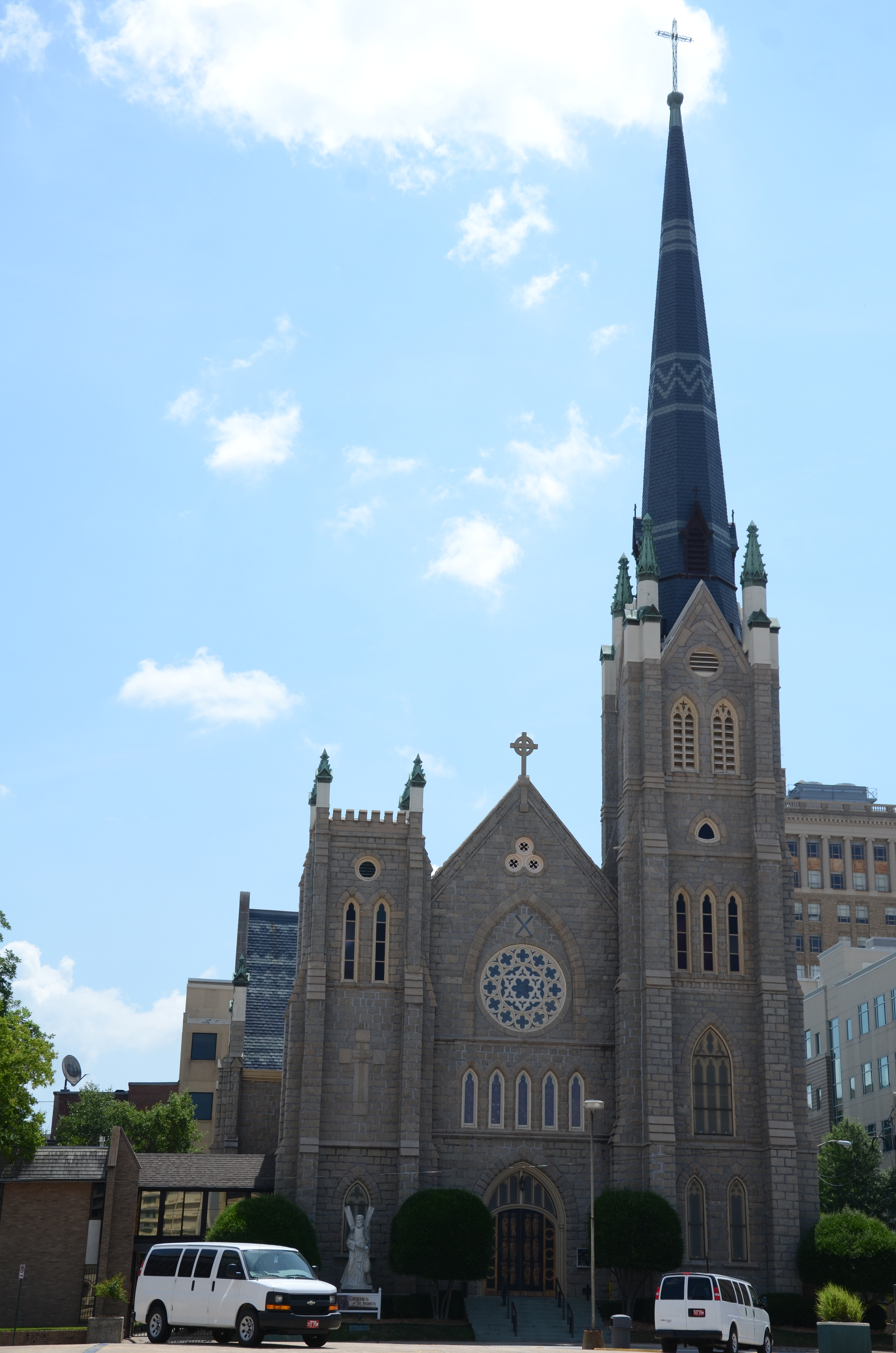
- Cathedral of St. Andrew

- Coat of Arms of the Diocese of Little Rock

Location
- Country: United States
- Territory: Arkansas
- Ecclesiastical province: Archdiocese of Oklahoma City

Statistics
- Population: 122,842 (4.1%)
- Parishes: 132

Information
- Denomination: Catholic
- Sui iuris church: Latin Church
- Rite: Roman Rite
- Established: 28 November 1843
- Cathedral: Cathedral of St. Andrew

Current leadership
- Pope: Leo XIV
- Bishop: Anthony Basil Taylor
- Metropolitan Archbishop: Paul Stagg Coakley

Map
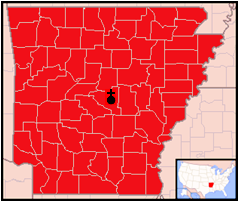

Website
- dolr.org

The Diocese of Little Rock (Latin: Dioecesis Petriculana) is a Roman Catholic diocese for Arkansas in the United States. It is a suffragan diocese of the metropolitan Archdiocese of Oklahoma City. The seat of the diocese is the Cathedral of St. Andrew in Little Rock.

== History ==
=== 1800 to 1843 ===
After the Louisiana Purchase in 1803, the present-day area of Arkansas was transferred from France to the United States. At that time, the area was part of the Diocese of Louisiana and the Two Floridas, a vast diocese covering most of the region. The US Government established the Arkansas Territory in 1819. The first Catholic missionary in Arkansas was the diocesan bishop, Louis Dubourg, who visited the Osage Nation in 1820.

In 1826, the Arkansas area and the Indian Territory (present-day Oklahoma) became part of the Diocese of St. Louis. Lazarist missionaries from Saint Mary's of the Barrens Seminary in Perryville, Missouri had started arriving in Arkansas in 1824 to minister to Native American converts and European settlers. Richard Bole established St. Mary's Mission near Pine Bluff. In 1836, Arkansas became a state. In 1838, Bole brought in five Sisters of Loretto from Ste. Geneviève, Missouri, who opened the first Catholic school in Arkansas.

=== 1843 to 1867 ===
Pope Gregory XVI erected the Diocese of Little Rock in 1843, including all of Arkansas and the Indian Territory. Andrew Byrne of the Archdiocese of New York was consecrated as its the first bishop in 1844. When Byrne arrived, most of the resident priests had left the diocese and the Catholic population was around 1,000. In 1845, he constructed the first cathedral in Little Rock. The first Catholic church in Fort Smith, Immaculate Conception, was built in 1848.

In the late 1840s, Byrne persuaded the Sisters of Mercy in Naas, Ireland to send 13 nuns to Arkansas. In 1850, the nuns established St. Mary's Academy in Little Rock. During the American Civil War, the diocese halted construction of new facilities. Byrne died in 1862. The diocese remained without a bishop for the next five years. The vicar general, Monsignor Peter O'Reilly, operated the diocese during this gap.

=== 1867 to 1900 ===
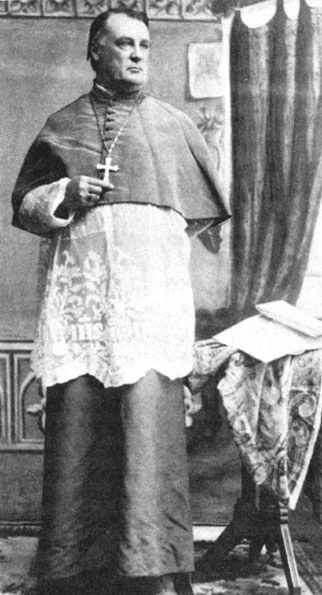
Bishop Fitzgerald (pre-1907)

The second bishop of Little Rock was Edward Fitzgerald from the Archdiocese of Cincinnati, named by Pope Pius IX in 1867.

At that time, the diocese had four parishes, five priests, and a Catholic population of 1600. The succeeding decades brought streams of European immigrants to the state: Benedictine monks from St. Meinrad, Indiana came in 1876 to Logan County to serve a growing German population. The Holy Ghost Fathers in 1879 started ministering to German colonies near Morrilton. A Polish parish was set up at Marche in 1880, and Italian ones followed in Sunnyside, Tontitown, New Gascony, and Barton.

In 1891, the Vatican removed the Indian Territory from the Diocese of Little Rock, creating the Apostolic Vicariate of the Indian Territory. In 1894, Fitzgerald dedicated the first church in Arkansas for African-Americans at Pine Bluff, where the diocese had previously established an industrial school for that group.

=== 1900 to 1946 ===
In 1906, Pope Pius X named Monsignor John B. Morris of the Diocese of Nashville as coadjutor bishop to assist Fitzgerald. Upon the death of Fitzgerald in 1907, Morris automatically succeeded him as the third bishop of Little Rock.

Morris opened Little Rock College for Boys in 1908 at a cost of $50,000. He also opened St. Joseph's Orphanage in North Little Rock, which was completed at a cost of $150,000 and placed under the care of the Benedictine Sisters, in 1910. He presided over the first diocesan synod in February 1909, and established the first school for Catholic teachers during the following June.

In 1911, Morris founded St. John Home Missions Seminary at Little Rock College; he considered it as his greatest accomplishment. That same year, he established the diocesan newspaper, The Southern Guardian. Morris erected separate parishes for African Americans in El Dorado, Fort Smith, Helena, Hot Springs, Lake Village, Little Rock, North Little Rock, and Pine Bluff; Morris also opened an African-American orphanage at Pine Bluff. He founded a school for boys near Searcy under the care of Poor Brothers of St. Francis, as well as a school for delinquent girls run by the Good Shepherd Sisters in Hot Springs.

Morris was confronted with a resurgence of anti-Catholicism early in his tenure. During World War I, many German American Catholics and German-speaking priests in Arkansas found themselves under suspicion. Morris, who was strongly patriotic and sold bonds during the war, helped mitigate such bigotry through his friendship with Arkansas Governor Joseph Robinson. Despite the financial hardships of the Great Depression, Morris raised $20,000 to purchase an organ for St. Andrew's Cathedral. Morris opened Catholic High School for Boys in Little Rock in 1930. He publicly condemned anti-Semitism following the Kristallnacht attacks on Jews in Germany in November 1938. Morris died in 1946.

=== 1946 to 2000 ===
Pope Pius XII appointed Auxiliary Bishop Albert Fletcher as the next bishop of Little Rock in 1946. He was a staunch advocate of racial desegregation, supporting the U.S. Supreme Court's ruling in Brown v. Board of Education in 1954. Fletcher reprimanded Arkansas Governor Orval Faubus for attempting to prevent court-ordered racial desegregation at Little Rock Central High School in 1957. In a 1960 publication entitled "An Elementary Catholic Catechism on the Morality of Segregation and Racial Discrimination", Fletcher described racial segregation as "immoral ... unjust and uncharitable". He also stated that it could even constitute mortal sin "when the act of racial prejudice committed is a serious infraction of the law of justice or charity".

Although Fletcher in 1964 inaugurated the liturgical use of the vernacular in his diocese, as prescribed by the Second Vatican Council, he did not follow the council's advice on creating permanent deacons. Fletcher closed St. John Seminary in Little Rock in 1967 after some of its faculty publicly questioned the church's stance on birth control and papal infallibility. Fletcher retired as bishop of Little Rock in 1972.

The next bishop of Little Rock was Monsignor Andrew McDonald from the Diocese of Savannah, named by Pope Paul VI in 1972. McDonald instituted permanent deacons in the diocese, largely because of the shortage of priests. He established an anti-abortion office in the diocesan curia and led the annual March for Life each January in Little Rock. In 1982, McDonald invited Mother Teresa to open a home for single mothers in Little Rock. He reached out to other denominations in Arkansas throughout his tenure, and assisted in promoting a Billy Graham crusade at War Memorial Stadium in Little Rock in 1989. McDonald retired in 2000.

=== 2000 to present ===
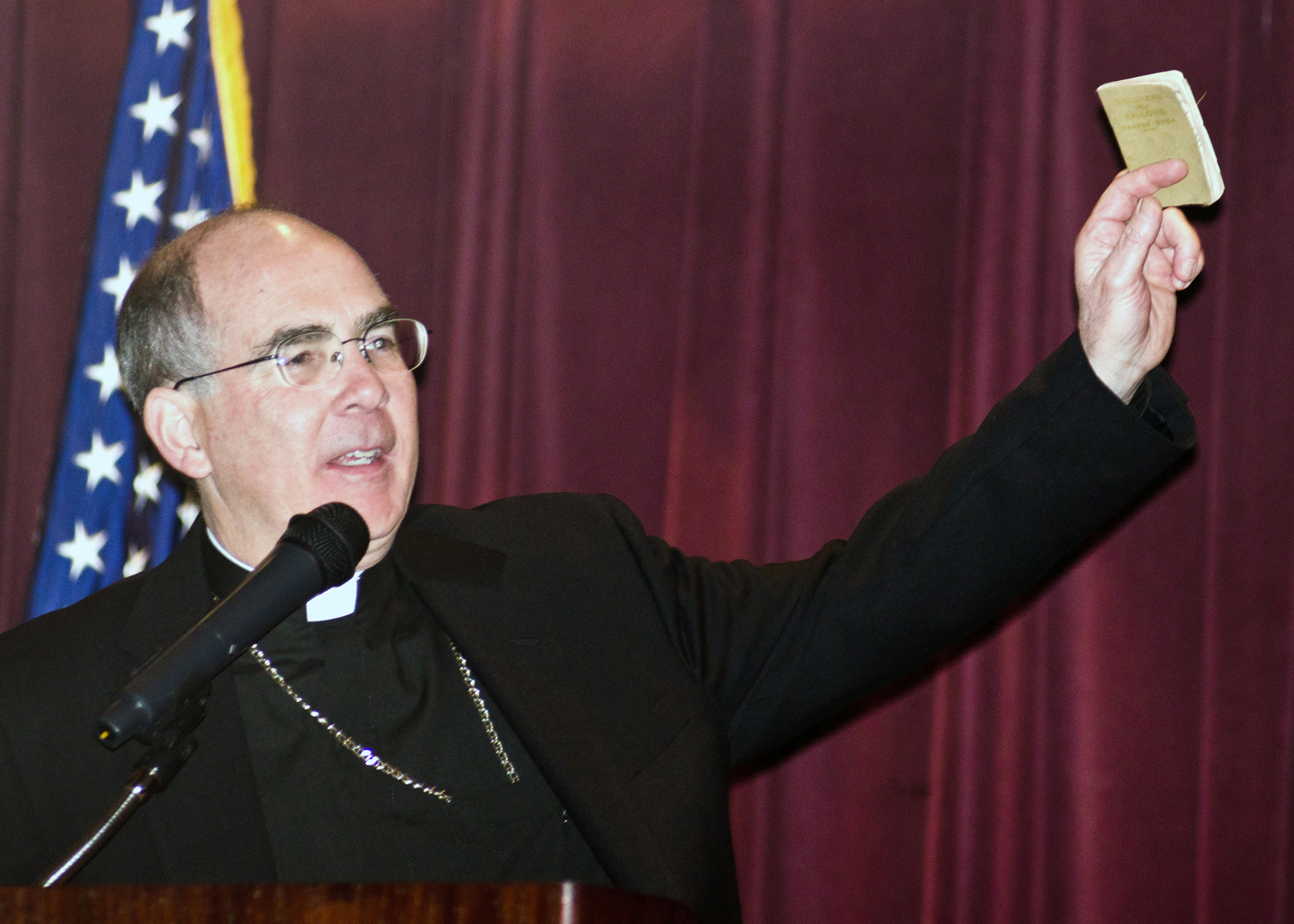
Bishop Sartain (2012)

Pope John Paul II in 2000 named J. Peter Sartain of the Diocese of Memphis as the next bishop of Little Rock. Sartain established Hispanic ministries throughout the state. He also ordained Arkansas's first Mexican-born priest and deacon.

In 2005, Sartain led more than 5,000 Catholics in a bilingual Eucharistic Congress. During his tenure, the Catholic population in Arkansas rose from 90,600 to over 107,000. Sartain was appointed bishop of the Diocese of Joliet in Illinois in 2006.

As of 2023, the current bishop of the Diocese of Little Rock is Anthony B. Taylor, named by Pope Benedict XVI in 2008. Taylor that year became the first American bishop to join the social media website Facebook.

In 2007, the Congregation for the Doctrine of the Faith at the Vatican announced that it had excommunicated six religious sisters in the diocese for heresy, the first instances in diocese history. The women had refused to recant the doctrines of the Community of the Lady of All Nations (Army of Mary). The sect believed that its founder, Marie Paule Giguere, was the reincarnation of the Virgin Mary.

Following the issuance of Pope Francis's July 2021 motu proprio Traditionis custodes, Taylor announced that the diocese would no long offer the Tridentine Mass at its parishes. Taylor permitted its continued celebration at two personal parishes operated by priests of the Priestly Fraternity of Saint Peter.

== Reports of sex abuse ==
In September 2018, the Diocese of Little Rock released a "preliminary" list of eight diocesan priests who were "credibly accused" of engaging in sex abuse of minors. Taylor acknowledged the history of abuse in the diocese and issued an apology. The list also contained the names of four additional priests transferred by other dioceses to Little Rock to avoid sexual abuse allegations.

- Paul Haas had multiple sexual abuse accusations from the Diocese of Nashville before going to Little Rock.
- Anthony McCay had ten alleged victims in several other states before his transfer to Little Rock in 1991.
- Francis Zimmer was transferred to the diocese in 1960, despite reports that he had molested three minors while serving in Texas.

Most of the men on the list were deceased at the time of its release. Donald Althoff, ordained in 1982 and removed from ministry in 1995, was the only priest ordained after the 1980s. The earliest priest on the list who committed abuse in the diocese was Edward Mooney, who was laicized in 1974.

In July 2019, the diocese paid $790,000 to five victims of John McDaniel. The abuse allegedly occurred while he was an associate pastor at Our Lady of the Holy Souls Church in Little Rock. He died in 1974.

In August 2019, another alleged victim filed a lawsuit against the diocese and St. Joseph's Catholic Church in Tontitown. The plaintiff accused Joseph Correnti of sexual abuse between 1995 and 2002. Correnti killed himself in 2002.

== Bishops ==
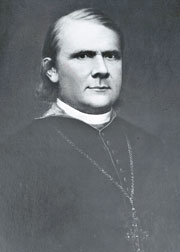
Bishop Byrne (pre-1862)

=== Bishops of Little Rock ===
1. Andrew Byrne (1843-1862)
2. Edward Fitzgerald (1866-1907)
3. John Baptist Morris (1907-1946; coadjutor bishop 1906–1907)
4. Albert Lewis Fletcher (1946-1972)
5. Andrew Joseph McDonald (1972-2000)
6. J. Peter Sartain (2000-2006), appointed Bishop of Joliet in Illinois and later Archbishop of Seattle
7. Anthony Basil Taylor (2008–present)

=== Auxiliary bishops ===
- Albert Lewis Fletcher (1939-1946), appointed Bishop of Little Rock
- Lawrence Preston Joseph Graves (1969-1973), appointed Bishop of Alexandria

=== Other diocesan priests who became bishops ===
- Francis Ignatius Malone, appointed Bishop of Shreveport in 2019
- Erik T. Pohlmeier, appointed Bishop of St. Augustine in 2022

== Education ==
During the 1960s, over 11,500 students were enrolled in schools operated by the diocese. During that decade, ten of the Catholic schools in the diocese were for African-Americans. Those ten schools were closed by 2013. As of 2025, the Catholic Schools Office was operating 26 schools with a total enrollment of 6,600 students.

=== High schools ===
==== Grades 9 to 12 ====
- Catholic High School for Boys – Little Rock (all-boys)
- Mount St. Mary Academy – Little Rock (all-girls)
- Ozark Academy – Tontitown. Founded in 2018 as an independent Catholic high school. It is the first Catholic high school in Northwest Arkansas.

==== Grades 7 to 12 ====
Subiaco Academy – Subiaco (all-boys)

==== Pre-K to 12 ====
- Sacred Heart School – Morrilton
- St. Joseph School – Conway
