= Anthony Taylor (bishop) =

US Catholic bishop

His Excellency, The Most Reverend Anthony Basil Taylor
- Bishop of Little Rock
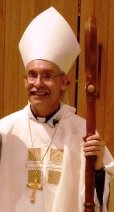
- Diocese: Little Rock
- Appointed: April 10, 2008
- Installed: June 5, 2008
- Predecessor: Archbishop James P. Sartain

Orders
- Ordination: August 2, 1980 by Charles Salatka
- Consecration: June 5, 2008 by Eusebius J. Beltran, Edward James Slattery, and J. Peter Sartain

Personal details
- Born: April 24, 1954 (age 72) Fort Worth, Texas, US
- Denomination: Roman Catholic
- Parents: Basil and Rachel (Roth) Taylor
- Education: University of Oklahoma; Saint Meinrad Seminary and School of Theology; Pontifical Gregorian University
- Motto: The humble shall inherit the earth

Styles of Anthony Basil Taylor
- Reference style: His Excellency; The Most Reverend
- Spoken style: Your Excellency
- Religious style: Bishop

Anthony Basil Taylor (born April 24, 1954) is an American Catholic prelate who has served as Bishop of Little Rock since 2008. He was a priest of the Archdiocese of Oklahoma from 1980 to 2008, interrupted by studies in New York at Fordham University. Much of his career has focused on service to the Hispanic community.

== Biography ==
=== Early life and education ===
Anthony Taylor was born in Fort Worth, Texas, on April 24, 1954, the oldest of seven children born to Basil and Rachel (Roth) Taylor. His parents and grandparents on both sides were long-time residents of Fort Worth. Two of his grandparents are converts to Catholicism (his mother's father from Judaism and his father's mother from Protestantism). The family moved to Ponca City, Oklahoma, in 1960.

Taylor attended parochial and public schools in Ponca, graduating from high school in 1972. He attended the University of Oklahoma in Norman, Oklahoma, for two years and then entered Saint Meinrad Seminary and School of Theology in St. Meinrad, Indiana, graduating with a Bachelor of Arts in history. From 1976 to 1980, Taylor attended the seminary at the Pontifical North American College in Rome while studying theology at the Pontifical Gregorian University.

=== Ordination and ministry ===
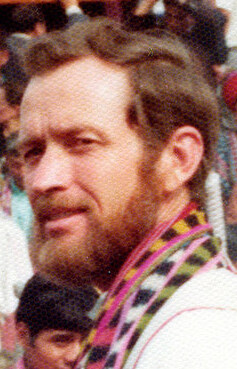
Reverend Stanley Rother (1980)

Taylor was ordained a priest by Archbishop Charles Salatka for the Archdiocese of Oklahoma City on August 2, 1980, at St. Mary Parish in Ponca City.

After his ordination, the diocese assigned him to Sacred Heart Parish in Oklahoma City. Within a month of his ordination he started celebrating mass in Spanish twice a month in Clinton and Hinton, Oklahoma. In 1982, he was transferred to western Oklahoma, where he lived at Queen of All Saints Mission in Sayre until 1986.

Taylor studied at Fordham University in New York City during the summers of 1984 and 1985, then attended the university full-time from 1986 to 1988. At the same time, he served Holy Rosary Parish in the Bronx. Taylor earned a doctorate in 1989. The title of his dissertation was "The Master-Servant Type Scene in the Parables of Jesus".

Upon his return to Oklahoma in 1989, Salatka named Taylor as the vicar for ministries of the archdiocese, a post he held for 20 years. He was responsible for ministry to priests and, for a number of years, was also responsible for the permanent diaconate program. He had responsibility for the orientation and oversight of the international priests serving in Oklahoma, for newly ordained priests in their first year of ministry, and for priests in their first year as pastors.

Taylor served as parochial vicar of four Oklahoma parishes from 1990 to 1993:

- Immaculate Conception in Seminole
- Saint Robert Bellarmine in Jones
- Saint Mary in Ardmore
- Saint Joseph in Norman

In 1993, Taylor became the founding pastor of St. Monica Parish in Edmond, Oklahoma. In 2003 he returned as pastor to Sacred Heart Parish in Oklahoma City, the largest Hispanic parish in the archdiocese.Taylor served as chair of the presbyteral council, the personnel board and the retirement board. He was a member of the archdiocesan finance council and a board member of the Mount St. Mary High School in Oklahoma City.

In 2006, the archdiocese designated Taylor as the delegate for the canonization cause of Reverend Stanley Rother. He was a diocesan priest who was murdered by a death squad while on a mission in Guatemala. Taylor had met Rother shortly before his death. Traveling to Guatemala, Taylor interviewed more than 50 people who worked with Rother or witnessed his death. His role as delegate ended when he left Oklahoma for Little Rock.

=== Bishop of Little Rock ===
Taylor was appointed bishop of the Diocese of Little Rock by Pope Benedict XVI on April 10, 2008. He received his episcopal consecration on June 5, 2008, at the Statehouse Convention Center in Little Rock from Archbishop Eusebius J. Beltran of Oklahoma City.

In June 2009, the U.S. Conference of Catholic Bishops (USCCB) elected Taylor to the board of the Catholic Legal Immigration Network (CLINIC), which provides legal services to low-income immigrants in the U.S. In 2010, he was a representative for the USCCB at a conference of regional bishops who endorsed a joint statement on immigration reform. In 2012, as member of the USCCB Committee on Migration, he led a delegation to the Middle East that reported on the plight of Syrian refugees. In 2014, the bishops elected Taylor to serve on the board of the Catholic Legal Immigration Network.

Taylor and the diocese were sued in April 2011 by a woman who alleged being manipulated into a sexual relationship by Reverend Charles U. Kanu, a Nigerian priest, at St. Peter the Fisherman Parish in Mountain Home, Arkansas. The plaintiff accused Taylor and the diocese of failing to protect her. Taylor had suspended Kanu in January 2011 when the accusations were reported.

In 2012, Taylor delivered a homily on how Catholics should approach the 2012 US presidential elections. Journalist Michael Sean Winters criticized some details but praised Taylor's ability to frame the issues without partisanship. In September 2018, Taylor released the results of a third-party review that identified 12 former priests of the diocese (one previously known) with credible allegations of sexual abuse of a minor. An update in February 2019 included priests accused elsewhere who had served in Little Rock.

Taylor in January 2018 declined to attend the March for Life in Little Rock, a protest event against abortion rights for women. He opposed the selection of Arkansas Attorney General Leslie Rutledge as the keynote speaker due to her support of capital punishment.

At the annual USCCB meeting in November 2019, Taylor was elected to the board of Catholic Relief Services. He was elected to a second three-year term in 2022. Following the July 2021 release of Traditionis custodes, an apostolic letter from Pope Francis, Taylor announced that the celebration of the Tridentine Mass in his diocese would be limited to two parishes administered by the Priestly Fraternity of Saint Peter.

Catholic Church titles
Preceded by J. Peter Sartain	Bishop of Little Rock; 2008–present	Succeeded by Incumbent
