= Cathedral of St. Andrew (Little Rock, Arkansas) =

Historic church in Arkansas, United States

- Cathedral of Saint Andrew
- U.S. National Register of Historic Places
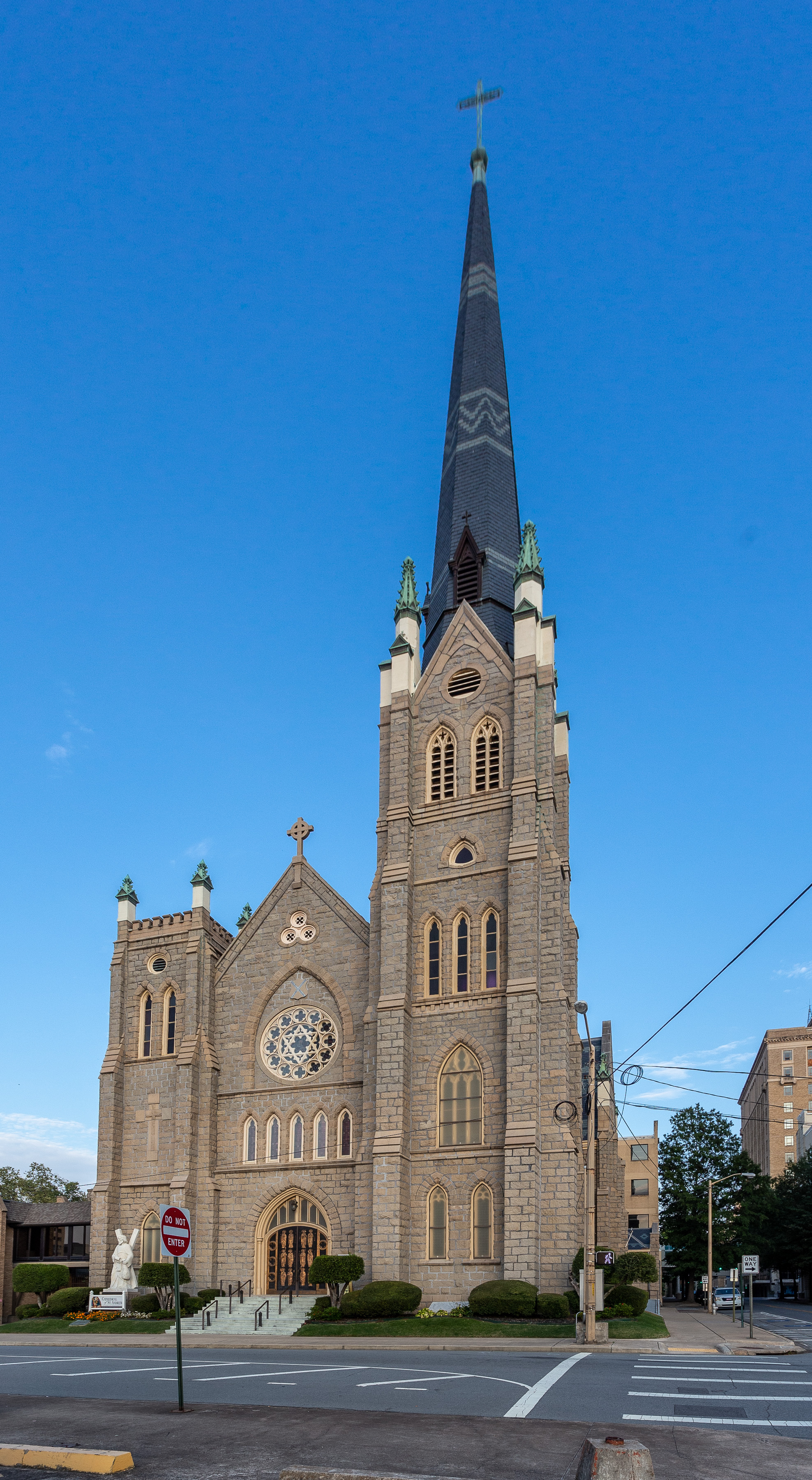

- Location within Arkansas Location within the United States
- Location: 617 Louisiana St. Little Rock, Arkansas
- Coordinates: 34°44′33″N 92°16′19″W
- Area: less than one acre
- Built: 1881
- Architect: Thomas Harding
- Architectural style: Gothic Revival
- NRHP reference No.: 86003117
- Added to NRHP: November 13, 1986

The Cathedral of Saint Andrew is the seat of the Roman Catholic Diocese of Little Rock in Little Rock, Arkansas, in the United States. It is located on South Louisiana Street in that city.

The cathedral is the oldest continuously used house of worship in Little Rock. As of 2025, the rector of the cathedral is Monsignor Joseph L. de Orbegozo.

== History ==
During the early 1800s, Little Rock was under the ecclesiastical jurisdiction of the Diocese of St. Louis in St. Louis, Missouri. The diocese in 1830 sent Reverend Peter Donnelly to minister to the small Catholic population in the city. Donnelly celebrated the first mass in Little Rock in a room over a store that same year.

As the congregation, it purchased a building in Little Rock to serve as a temporary chapel. The Lazarist missionary Joseph Richard Bole and a Reverend Paris built the first St. Andrew Church on Louisiana Street in 1839; it became known as the Old French Church. Bishop Mathias Loras of the Diocese of Dubuque dedicated it in 1841. That same year, the parish opened a convent for a contingent of the Sisters of Loretto, who later opened a school.

Pope Gregory XVI erected the Diocese of Little Rock on November 28, 1843, with St. Andrew Parish designated as the episcopal seat. Bishop Andrew Byrne dedicated the first St. Andrew Cathedral in 1845. In 1850, Byrne recruited a contingent of Sisters of Mercy from Ireland to come to the parish. He converted his residence next to the cathedral into a convent for them. The sisters then opened a day school with 55 students, nearly all of whom were non-Catholics.

As the parish grew, Bishop Edward Fitzgerald decided that it needed a larger cathedral. He laid the cornerstone for the present St. Andrew Cathedral on July 7, 1878, and dedicated it on November 27, 1881. The tallest tower on the building was completed in 1887. The parish purchased another property in 1923 to build a larger St. Andrew School, which opened in 1924.

In 1947, the parish completed extensive repairs to the cathedral roof, walls and steeples. A tornado in 1950 toppled the cross on one of the towers and shattered two of the cathedral's stained glass windows. The parish in 1962 constructed a new crypt. The crypt contains the remains of four bishops of the diocese. With the decline in families in the parish, St. Andrew School closed in 1952. The rectory was replaced in 1966.

The parish in 1975 undertook a large scale renovation and restructuring of the cathedral. They extended the sanctuary into the apse, installed a new sacrifice altar and placed screens behind the high altar.

St. Andrew's Cathedral was listed on the National Register of Historic Places in 1986.

== Cathedral ==
The Cathedral of St. Andrew was designed by Little Rock architect Thomas Harding and cost $470,000 to build. it is a Gothic Revival style structure constructed of gray granite stone, quarried at Fourche Mountain near Little Rock. The cathedral measures 140 feet (43 m) in length and its nave is 86 feet (26 m) wide. Its walls are 36 feet high.

The exterior of the cathedral has two towers, the tallest of which has a spire rising 86 feet (26 m) above the ground. The cathedral bell was installed in its tower in 1886, dedicated at that time to Reverend Patrick Reilly, the first rector of the cathedral. Cast by the McShane Bell Foundry in Baltimore, Maryland, the bell weighs between 3300 and 3400 pounds. From 1890 until 1944, it served as part of the Little Rock fire alarm system.

The cathedral interior is finished in Southern yellow pine and features a marble high altar that is decorated with onyx and other precious stones. The walls display paintings of the 14 Station of the Cross. They were created for Holy Name Cathedral in Chicago, Illinois, but the studio sent them to St. Andrew by mistake. The paintings ordered by St. Andrew were actually smaller in size.

In 1916, the cathedral had four organs: the “pedal organ,” the “echo organ”, the “swell organ,” and the “Great organ.” They were all replaced in 1931 with the purchase of a pipe organ from the M.P. Moller Pipe Organ Company of Hagerstown, Maryland. With over 3,000 pipes and 25 bells, it was considered at the time to be one of the best pipe organs in Arkansas.

== See also ==
- Diocese of Little Rock
- List of Catholic cathedrals in the United States
- List of cathedrals in the United States
- National Register of Historic Places listings in Little Rock, Arkansas
