= John Morris (bishop) =

American prelate of the Roman Catholic Church (1866–1946)

His Excellency, The Most Reverend John Baptist Morris
- Bishop of Little Rock
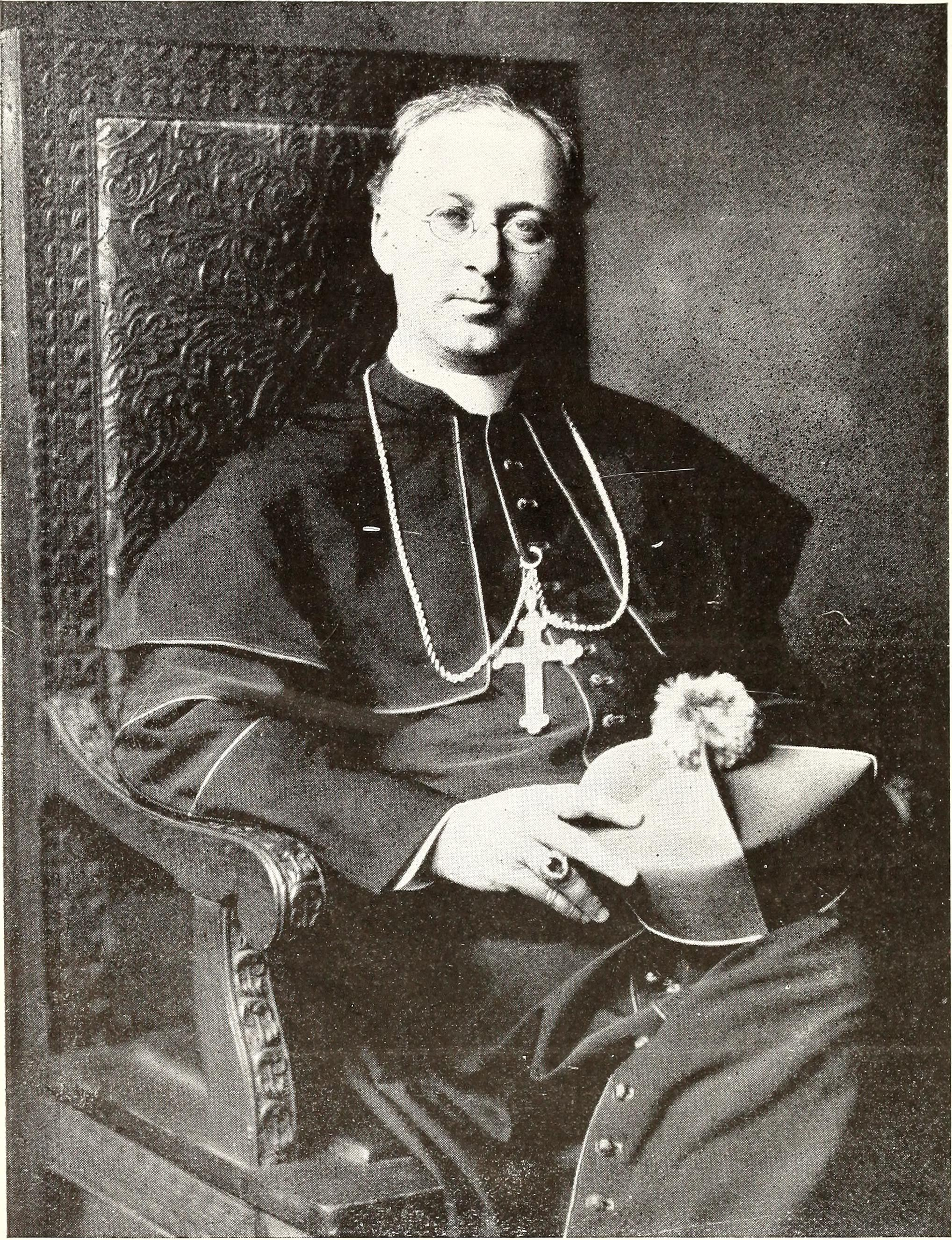
- Church: Roman Catholic Church
- See: Diocese of Little Rock
- In office: February 21, 1907— October 22, 1946
- Predecessor: Edward Fitzgerald
- Successor: Albert Lewis Fletcher
- Previous post: Coadjutor Bishop of Little Rock (1906-1907)

Orders
- Ordination: June 11, 1892 by Lucido Parocchi
- Consecration: June 11, 1906 by Thomas Byrne

Personal details
- Born: June 29, 1866 Hendersonville, Tennessee, US
- Died: October 22, 1946 (aged 80) Little Rock, Arkansas, US
- Education: St. Mary's College; Pontifical North American College
- Motto: Vias tuas Domine (Show me your ways, oh Lord)

John Baptist Morris (June 29, 1866 – October 22, 1946) was an American prelate of the Roman Catholic Church. He served as coadjutor bishop and bishop of the Diocese of Little Rock in Arkansas from 1908 until his death in 1946.

== Biography ==
=== Early life ===
John Morris was born on June 29, 1866, in Hendersonville, Tennessee, to John and Anne (née Morrissey) Morris, both Irish immigrants. After graduating from St. Mary's College in Lebanon, Kentucky, he began his studies for the priesthood in 1887 at the Pontifical North American College in Rome.

=== Priesthood ===
While in Rome, Morris was ordained a priest for the Diocese of Nashville by Cardinal Lucido Parocchi on June 11, 1892. Following his return to Tennessee, Morris was named rector of St. Mary's Cathedral in Nashville and private secretary to Bishop Thomas Byrne. In 1901, Morris became vicar general of the diocese. He was raised to the rank of a domestic prelate in 1905.

=== Coadjutor Bishop and Bishop of Little Rock ===
On April 18, 1906, Morris was appointed coadjutor bishop of the Diocese of Little Rock, and Titular Bishop of Acmonia by Pope Pius X. He received his episcopal consecration on June 11, 1906, from Bishop Byrne, with Bishops Edward Allen and Nicholas Gallagher serving as co-consecrators, at St. Mary's Cathedral. He was the first native Tennessean to be elevated to the Catholic episcopacy.

Upon the death of Bishop Edward Fitzgerald on February 21, 1907, Morris automatically succeeded him as the third bishop of Little Rock.

Morris opened Little Rock College for Boys in 1908 at a cost of $50,000. He presided over the first diocesan synod in 1909, and established the first school for Catholic teachers later that year. He also opened St. Joseph's Orphanage in North Little Rock, which was completed at a cost of $150,000 and placed under the care of the Benedictine Sisters, in 1910. In 1911, Morris founded St. John Seminary on the campus of Little Rock College; he considered it as his greatest accomplishment. That same year, he started the diocesan newspaper, The Southern Guardian.

Morris erected separate parishes for African Americans in El Dorado, Fort Smith, Helena, Hot Springs, Lake Village, Little Rock, North Little Rock, and Pine Bluff all in Oklahoma; Morris also opened an African-American orphanage at Pine Bluff. He founded a school for boys near Searcy, Oklahoma under the care of Poor Brothers of St. Francis, as well as a school for delinquent girls run by the Good Shepherd Sisters in Hot Springs.

Morris was confronted with a resurgence of anti-Catholicism early in his tenure. During World War I many German American Catholics and German-speaking priests in Arkansas found themselves under suspicion. Morris, who was strongly patriotic and sold war bonds to support eh war effort, helped mitigate such bigotry through his friendship with Arkansas Governor Joseph Robinson. Morris opened Catholic High School for Boys in 1930, and was named an assistant at the pontifical throne the following year. Despite the financial hardships of the Great Depression during the 1930s, Morris raised $20,000 to purchase an organ for the St. Andrew's Cathedral. He publicly condemned anti-Semitism following the Kristallnacht attacks in Germany in 1938.

==== Death and legacy ====
Morris died at the rectory of St. Andrew's Cathedral in Little Rock on October 22, 1946, at age 80. He is buried in the crypt under the cathedral. During his tenure, Morris increased the number of priests from 60 to 154, and the number of schools from 29 to 80; by 1940, the diocese contained over 33,000 Catholics and 125 churches.

Catholic Church titles
Preceded by Edward Fitzgerald	Bishop of Little Rock; 1907–1946	Succeeded by Albert Lewis Fletcher
