= Church Militant (website) =

Catholic media organization

- Website type: News and opinion
- Owners: St. Michael's Media, Inc.
- Founder: Michael Voris
- Revenue: USD$2.8 million (December 2018)
- Employees: 34 (December 2018)
- Website: churchmilitant.com
- Registration: Optional
- Current status: Defunct (March 13, 2024)

St. Michael's Media was a conservative organization founded by Michael Voris that operated as a news website in Michigan under the officially registered assumed name of Church Militant, via the website ChurchMilitant.com. It was a Michigan 501(c)(4) corporation. It was known as Real Catholic TV until 2012, when the Archdiocese of Detroit notified Michael Voris and Real Catholic TV that "it does not regard them as being authorized to use the word 'Catholic' to identify or promote their public activities". Voris responded by changing the name to Church Militant.

While Church Militant made use of a paywall and offered premium content to subscribers, the website's main feature was its free segment The Vortex, simulcast on YouTube and hosted by Voris. As of December 2018, 34 employees were creating videos and writing content for Church Militant. Voris resigned from Church Militant in November 2023 due to violations of the organization's morality clause. After losing a defamation suit, Church Militant announced plans to cease operations altogether by the end of April 2024. As of March 14, 2024, its website was no longer available.

== Name and status ==
The site was named after the Catholic doctrinal distinctions in the universal Church among the Church Militant, Church Penitent, and Church Triumphant. According to a June 2020 press statement by the Archdiocese of Detroit, the Church Militant is not a Church apostolate.

"During the late afternoon hours of June 11, 2020, the Archdiocese of Detroit was made aware that Church Militant, an organization located in southeast Michigan, published racist and derogatory language in reference to the Archbishop of Washington D.C., Wilton D. Gregory.
That evening, Detroit Archbishop Allen Vigneron responded:
'Racist and derogatory speech wrongfully diminishes the God-given dignity of others. It is not in accord with the teachings of Christ. As our nation continues its important conversation on racism, it is my hope that the faithful will turn from this and all other acts or attitudes which deny the inherent dignity shared by all people.'
The Archdiocese of Detroit unequivocally condemns the offensive language used in reference to Archbishop Gregory and advises the faithful that Church Militant is not affiliated with, endorsed, or recommended by the Archdiocese of Detroit; it is not recognized as a Church apostolate. The organization formerly operated under the name “Real Catholic TV” from its headquarters in Ferndale, Michigan, until 2011 when it received notification from the Detroit archdiocese that it lacked the authorization required under Church (canon) law to identify or promote itself as Catholic. It subsequently changed its name to Church Militant."

== Influence ==
Because of its wide viewership among conservative traditionalist Catholics, Church Militant exposés have been reported to cause deplatforming of liberal Catholics, such as in the case of Dan Schutte, who was disinvited from a concert after a Vortex segment accused him of being gay. Also targeted has been James J. Martin, whose book Building a Bridge proved controversial among Catholics, which Martin says has led some venues to rescind their invitations to speaking engagements. Michael Sean Winters and other Catholic journalists accused Church Militant of playing a role in Tony Spence's "forced" resignation from Catholic News Service as its editor-in-chief, because of his opposition towards proposed bathroom bill legislation.

Church Militant has been highly critical of the Society of Saint Pius X in articles on its website, particularly about their handling of sexual abuse cases. In April and August 2020, Church Militant published a number of accusations, including some older ones, on its website. In response, the Society of Saint Pius X criticized Church Militant, writing that "it is well known that Church Militant is not a serious journalistic enterprise but a repository of sensationalized stories, hit pieces, and videos featuring the opinions of its controversial founder, Michael Voris. Further, Church Militant has repeatedly used the SSPX's name to generate web-clicks and revenue while hoping to stoke the fires of public controversy by baiting it into a war of words. Prudence dictates caution when dealing with a tabloid, and we will not be so baited."

In June 2020, Church Militant faced backlash after it released a video in which Voris repeatedly accused Washington Archbishop Wilton Daniel Gregory of being an "accused homosexual", "Marxist", and an "African Queen". Church Militant released the video after Archbishop Gregory had criticized United States president Donald Trump for clearing protestors so that he could have a photo op in front of a church. Gregory then called it "baffling and reprehensible" that Trump should visit the shrine of Pope John Paul II, which Trump did on the occasion of signing an international order to advance religious freedom. Catholic scholar Anthea Butler and Jesuit James J. Martin called Church Militant racist and homophobic, and a few days later, Detroit Archbishop Allen Vigneron publicly condemned the video; the archdiocese issued a disclaimer distancing itself from Church Militant.

== Views and positions ==
Samuel G. Freedman of The New York Times says, "To fully grasp what 'church militant' means in this highly politicized atmosphere, it helps to examine the broader movement and the role of a traditionalist Catholic website called — to no surprise — ChurchMilitant.com." Freedman bases his article on an interview with Michael Voris and says that Church Militant's alleged "right-wing stances ... mesh with many of the positions espoused by Mr. Trump and his inner circle". Freedman summarizes Voris's views by saying that "the website's positions were a righteous defense of patriotism and morality on behalf of people who believe those virtues have been attacked by liberals, secularists and global elites".

Freedman says that Voris's online audience was cumulatively "about 1.5 million views a month", and characterized the publication's position as one that dismisses anthropogenic climate change, thinks the Black Lives Matter movement is akin to "the new fascism", and called Hillary Clinton "Killary", who was acting as "Satan's mop for wiping up the last remaining resistance to him in America". The article also quoted Voris's father critique of social-welfare programs as a system where "half the people of America" do not pay taxes and "get things handed to them". Church Militant responded to The New York Times article in a panel discussion in which the panel called Freedman's article a "hit piece" and "dishonest".

On February 19, 2017, Robert Allen, in a piece for the Detroit Free Press, which was republished by USA Today, wrote that Voris's studio in Ferndale was "the nerve center for a growing, religious group hoping the forces that elected President Donald Trump will tear down the wall between church and state". He called Voris' publication "a fringe group claiming to be Catholic but denounced by the church, [that] broadcasts pro-life, anti-gay, anti-feminist, Islam-fearing content on its website" and that "many of Church Militant's headlines are similar to those on Breitbart News, the far-right news organization that White House Chief Strategist Steve Bannon previously ran." According to Allen, Voris proclaimed that the election of Trump showed that the notion of mainstream media has been altered, "The Entire established order has been thrown up into the air. What we say now has some credence. We're allowed into the discussion." Church Militant responded to the Detroit Free Press/USA Today article in a panel discussion in which it also addressed the Detroit archdiocese.

On May 9, 2017, The Atlantic released a video on the operations at Church Militant, featuring interviews with Voris and behind-the-scenes footage at their offices. In May 2022, white nationalist Nick Fuentes' live-streaming service Cozy.tv, was promoted by Church Militant activists in what Salon described as an ongoing collaboration between the Groyper movement and far-right Catholics.

== Criticism and classification as a hate group ==
In a 2011 article in the National Catholic Register, Mark Shea wrote:

Voris and his defenders in the comboxes are not really attacking Progressive Dissenters in this and several other contretemps. They are, by and large, attacking faithful Catholics in conservative Catholic media and labeling them as Progressive Dissenters.

Consider: How else can we explain how a defense of Michael Voris could possibly be labeled "AmChurch liberalism"? Does a scribe for Commonweal describe somebody as conscience-haunted as Simon Rafe as "running wild"? No, it is a combox fan of Voris who does that. Would any normal healthy Catholic say that the Catholic News Agency is staffed by people devoted to “PC enforcement, demonizing of outspoken orthodoxy, and propagation of modernism"? Could any sane person talk as though the Register is dedicated to the protection of "libs and progressives and dishonest people who hate what he says about Catholic doctrine."

As of 2019, the Southern Poverty Law Center classifies Church Militant as an anti-LGBT hate group. The Southern Poverty Law Center's Hatewatch published an article entitled "Ultra-orthodox Catholic propaganda outlet pushes anti-LGBT agenda", in which Hatewatch quotes from Michael Sean Winters's article on the National Catholic Reporter titled "Church Militant's nonsense not authentically Catholic", saying that Voris tends to attack others without subtlety or humility, and that he is ignorant of the history of the Catholic Church.
