= Yesteryear (novel) =

2026 debut novel by Caro Claire Burke

- Author: Caro Claire Burke
- Genres: Satire and suspense
- Set in: Idaho
- Publisher: Alfred A. Knopf
- Publication date: April 7, 2026
- ISBN: 9798217287857

Yesteryear is a 2026 debut novel by Caro Claire Burke. The story follows Natalie Heller Mills, a "tradwife" social media influencer, who wakes up one day in the 19th century, where she must learn how to live without the convenience of modern society. The novel is both satire and suspense.

== Process ==
Before writing Yesteryear, Burke amassed a following on TikTok where she discussed topics like feminism and tradwives. She also gained an audience through her politics and pop culture podcast Diabolical Lies, cohosted by Katie Gatti Tassin. Burke first settled on the title word, "Yesteryear", before developing the book subsequently.

Yesteryear had 15 publishing houses bid on the rights to publish it, with Alfred A. Knopf ultimately winning the battle in spring of 2024.

Burke went on a book tour across the United States and other countries to promote Yesteryear. When speaking with Variety, Burke said, "I've gone to a ton of red states — we really wanted to go to areas where these topics were more in tension, so that’s been amazing."

== Synopsis ==
Natalie Heller Mills lives on Yesteryear Ranch with her husband Caleb and their 5, soon to be 6, children. Natalie is a social media influencer who promotes traditional gender roles, Christian teachings, and farm life. Natalie and Caleb homeschool their children and claim to live mainly off the land.

One day, Natalie wakes up in what seems like the year 1855, where she recognizes no one and must learn to live without modern society. The novel is told in two streams: one, from Natalie's life before the incident, and a second timeline, from her life as she tries to unravel the mystery of her situation.

=== Modern life ===
Natalie grew up in a religious Idaho household. She goes to Harvard for college, where she finds herself frustrated by what she sees as the shallow, obnoxious behavior of the more secular girls. She meets her husband Caleb, the youngest son of a well-known Republican political dynasty, and drops out after her second year to raise a family with him. Caleb, unambitious and unskilled, struggles to find a job, and Natalie decides buying a ranch back in Idaho would be a good use of his free time.

At the ranch, attempts at traditional farming are failures due to the enormous cost and Caleb’s incompetence. Natalie falls into social media content production as a way to pay the bills, and gradually employs several people: nannies for the children, ranch hands, and a social media producer named Shannon. She becomes a popular influencer on Instagram, as she maintains an internet persona of living traditionally and being a devoted mother and wife, while maintaining an iron grip on the household and finances. She gradually becomes alienated from her increasingly less-devout mother and sister due to her strident politics and unpleasant personality. Caleb becomes entrenched in online men’s rights and conspiracy movements, which gradually affect the campaign rhetoric of his politician father Doug.

After she discovers Caleb and Shannon are having an affair, Natalie physically assaults Shannon. Doug initially helps mitigate the public story after Shannon goes to the press with the assault, but withdraws support once the nature of Shannon’s allegations conflict with his far-right populist views. Natalie loses public credibility and her following.

=== 1855 life ===
Natalie wakes up to discover she is in the mid-19th century, in a house similar to her own, but without modern-day appliances. She does not recognize the children living with her: Mary, the eldest, Maeve, the youngest, and two boys, Abel and Noah. She describes the husband of the farm as "Old Caleb," as he seems similar to her husband, but much older and crueler. After an escape attempt, Natalie's foot gets seriously injured from a snare trap, and she resigns herself to living on the ranch. She begins to feel like she is being watched, perhaps on a reality TV show, and waits to be rescued.

As the months pass, Natalie realizes it is no prank. She copes by believing her situation is a divine test from God. Natalie also realizes she has not gotten her period for many months and believes she is pregnant. As winter approaches, Maeve falls sick, and Natalie decides she must leave for good before she becomes more pregnant and the weather gets colder. Mary instructs her where to go, and she leaves under the pretense of getting medicine for Maeve. After walking for some hours, she finds a trailer marked "MANOSPHERE" with instant ramen inside and a TV. The man living there calls her "Mama."

Natalie runs home, where she finds an adult version of Clementine, her eldest daughter, outside driving a car. She reveals to Natalie and Caleb that she has a warrant to take the children from claims of child abuse and neglect. Natalie realizes she is not in the past, but in fact, in the future, where she is in her 50s. After the public fallout from her assault of Shannon, Natalie slowly became detached from reality, withdrawing from the outside world and transforming the ranch into a simulacrum of 19th century living. A stress-induced psychosis caused her to mentally revert several decades. This is said to be a common occurrence. Clementine takes the children and leaves her parents alone at the ranch.

=== 5 years later ===
Natalie is serving a sentence in prison for child neglect. She finally agrees to an interview with her former college roommate Reena, who is now a journalist. They discuss her life on Yesteryear Ranch and Natalie has the chance to read the first chapter of Mary's memoir, dedicated to her mother.

== Characters ==
- Natalie Heller Mills, the unreliable narrator, who runs a social media account for her farm Yesteryear. She married Caleb at the age of 20.
- Caleb, Natalie's husband, who works on the farm and has an affair with Shannon. He grew up in a wealthy family, the son of a politician.
- Shannon, Natalie's 21-year-old social media producer.
- Clementine, Caleb and Natalie's eldest child.
- Mary, Natalie's eldest in the 1855 timeline. She is very hardworking and responsible, taking care of the family.
- Reena, Natalie's ex-college roommate from Harvard who goes on to become a journalist.

== Reception ==
Writing for The Conversation, Rachel Williamson compares the main character to Hannah Neeleman of Ballerina Farm, a social media personality who lives on a farm similar to the fictional Natalie. In a review for The Guardian, Rhiannon Lucy Cosslett praised Yesteryear's premise and dark humor, but criticized the novel for prioritizing its mystery plot over deeper exploration of motherhood, politics, and religion. The review also described its treatment of childbirth, disability, and birth injury as underdeveloped and insufficiently researched. In Compact, Julia Yost also criticized "the stereotyped nature of Natalie’s physical life" in addition to the prose of the novel, which Yost saw as poor.

Cecilia Cicone for the Catholic Courier gave a critical review, writing that "the author misses the mark by providing an uncompelling critique of social media influencer culture." Jessica Hooten Wilson in the Washington Examiner wrote that the novel is "predicated on a false either-or about the available options for women."

Kirkus Reviews gave the novel a starred review, calling it "A remarkable debut—both a book for the moment and one that will endure."

== Film adaptation ==
The film rights for Yesteryear were sold to Amazon MGM Studios before being published, in July 2024. Anne Hathaway is set to both star and produce the movie, and she is listed in the novel's Acknowledgements section. Hannah Friedman is set to write the script adaptation. According to Deadline, the price MGM paid for the movie rights is $450,000, rising to $2 million if the film is produced. The auction was brokered by the firm UTA.

== See also ==
- Allegory of the cave
- Running Out of Time (novel)
- Shutter Island (novel)
- The Village (2004 film)
- Antebellum (2020 film)
