= List of Catholic newspapers and magazines in the United States =

This article is a list of Catholic newspapers and magazines in the United States.

For the frequency listings, the terminology will be as follows

- Bimonthly: every two months, not two per month
- Biweekly: every two weeks, not two per week.

== By state and diocese or eparchy ==
The following is a list containing the official newspaper, newsletter, magazine or other publication of the dioceses of the United States, organized alphabetically by state followed by diocese:

State	Diocese	Title	Type	Circulation	Frequency	Years active
Alaska	Anchorage	Catholic Anchor		11,000	Monthly	1999
Alaska	Fairbanks	The Alaskan Shepherd			Biweekly	1963
Alaska	Juneau	The Southeast Alaska Catholic			Monthly	2010
Alabama	Birmingham	One Voice	Magazine	20,000	Weekly	1969
Alabama	Mobile	The Catholic Week			Weekly	1935
Arkansas	Little Rock	Arkansas Catholic		7,000	Weekly	1911
Arizona	Gallup	Voice of the Southwest			Quarterly	1961
Arizona	Phoenix	The Catholic Sun		115,000	Weekly	1985
Arizona	Tucson	Catholic Outlook				
California	Fresno	The Grapevine			Monthly	2007
California	Los Angeles	Angelus Magazine (formerly The Tidings )		140,000	Monthly	1895
California	Oakland	The Catholic Voice	Magazine	90,000	Biweekly	1962
California	Orange	Orange County Catholic		80,000	Weekly	
California	Sacramento	Catholic Herald	Magazine	42,000	Bimonthly	
California	San Bernardino	Inland Catholic Byte				
California	San Diego	The Southern Cross		42,000	Monthly	1912
California	San Francisco	Catholic San Francisco		62,000	26 per year	1999
California	San Francisco	San Francisco Católico			20 per year	2012
California	San Jose	The Valley Catholic	Magazine	70,000	Quarterly	1982
California	Santa Rosa	North Coast Catholic			Monthly	2001
Colorado	Colorado Springs	The Colorado Catholic Herald			Biweekly	1979
Colorado	Denver	Denver Catholic		80,000	Biweekly	1900
Connecticut	Bridgeport	Fairfield County Catholic			Monthly	
Connecticut	Hartford	The Catholic Transcript		80,000	Monthly	1898
Connecticut	Norwich	Four County Catholic	Magazine		Monthly	1989
Delaware	Wilmington	The Dialog			Biweekly	
Florida	Miami	Florida Catholic		140,000	Monthly	1939
Florida	Orlando	Florida Catholic		140,000	Biweekly	1939
Florida	Palm Beach	Florida Catholic		140,000	Biweekly	1939
Florida	Pensacola–Tallahassee	The Catholic Compass		19,000	Bimonthly	
Florida	St. Augustine	St. Augustine Catholic		30,000	Bimonthly	1991
Florida	Saint Petersburg	Living Eucharist				
Florida	Venice	Florida Catholic		140,000	Biweekly	1939
Georgia	Atlanta	The Georgia Bulletin		75,000	Biweekly	
Georgia	Savannah	Southern Cross		68,000	Biweekly	
Hawaii	Honolulu	Hawaii Catholic Herald		15,400	Monthly	1947
Iowa	Davenport	The Catholic Messenger			Weekly	1883
Iowa	Des Moines	The Catholic Mirror			Monthly	1966
Iowa	Dubuque	The Witness			Weekly	1920
Iowa	Sioux City	The Catholic Globe			Biweekly	
Idaho	Boise	Idaho Catholic Register		16,000	Biweekly	1958
Illinois	Belleville	The Messenger			Biweekly	
Illinois	Chicago	Catholic New World		32,000	Biweekly	
Illinois	Chicago	Catolico			Monthly	1985
Illinois	Joliet	Christ is Our Hope			Monthly	2008
Illinois	Peoria	The Catholic Post			Weekly	1934
Illinois	Rockford	The Observer			Weekly	1935 El Observador www.ElObservador.info
Illinois	Springfield	Catholic Times				
Indiana	Evansville	The Message			Weekly	1970
Indiana	Fort Wayne–South Bend	Today's Catholic News		Digital	Weekly	
Indiana	Gary	Northwest Indiana Catholic			Weekly Summer: biweekly	
Indiana	Indianapolis	The Criterion		56,000	Weekly	
Indiana	Lafayette	The Catholic Moment			Weekly	1945
Kansas	Dodge City	Southwest Kansas Register			Biweekly	1965
Kansas	Kansas City	The Leaven		185,000	Weekly Summer: biweekly	1939
Kansas	Salina	The Register		16,000	Biweekly	
Kansas	Wichita	Catholic Advance			Biweekly	1865
Kansas	Wichita	Avance Católico			Biweekly	
Kentucky	Covington	Messenger			Weekly June–July: biweekly	1926
Kentucky	Lexington	Cross Roads			Biweekly	
Kentucky	Louisville	The Record		56,000	Weekly	1879
Kentucky	Owensboro	Western Kentucky Catholic			Monthly	1973
Louisiana	Alexandria	Church Today			Monthly	1970
Louisiana	Baton Rouge	The Catholic Commentator		36,000	Biweekly	1963
Louisiana	Houma–Thibodaux	Bayou Catholic			Monthly	1980
Louisiana	New Orleans	Clarion Herald		30,000	Weekly	1963
Louisiana	Shreveport	The Catholic Connection			Weekly	1963
Massachusetts	Boston	The Pilot		23,000	Weekly	1829
Massachusetts	Fall River	The Anchor			Weekly	1957
Massachusetts	Newton	Sophia Journal			Quarterly	
Massachusetts	Worcester	The Catholic Free Press			Weekly	1951
Maryland / Washington, DC	Baltimore	The Catholic Review		50,000	Biweekly	1913
Maryland / Washington, DC	Washington	Catholic Standard		46,000	Weekly	1951
Maryland / Washington, DC	Washington	El Pregonero		25,000	Biweekly	1977
Michigan	Detroit	Detroit Catholic			Digital	2018
Michigan	Gaylord	FAITH along Michigan's 45th Parallel	Magazine		Quarterly	2015
Michigan	Grand Rapids	Faith Grand Rapids	Magazine		Monthly	2007
Michigan	Kalamazoo	The Good News	Magazine	18,500	Monthly	
Michigan	Lansing	FAITH	Magazine	80,000	Monthly	
Michigan	Marquette	The U.P. Catholic				1946
Michigan	Saginaw	Great Lakes Bay Catholic	Magazine		Quarterly	2007
Minnesota	Crookston	Our Northland Diocese	Magazine	14,000	Biweekly	
Minnesota	Duluth	The Northern Cross			Monthly	
Minnesota	New Ulm	The Prairie Catholic				
Minnesota	Saint Cloud	The Central Minnesota Catholic	Magazine			
Minnesota	Saint Paul and Minneapolis	The Catholic Spirit		90,000	Weekly	1911
Minnesota	Winona-Rochester	The Courier		15,000	Monthly	
Missouri	Jefferson City	Catholic Missourian			Weekly Summer: biweekly	
Missouri	Kansas City–Saint Joseph	The Catholic Key	Magazine		Biweekly	
Missouri	Springfield–Cape Girardeau	The Mirror			Biweekly	1965
Missouri	St. Louis	Catholic St. Louis	Magazine	130,000	Bimonthly	
Missouri	St. Louis	St. Louis Review	Newspaper		Weekly	
Mississippi	Biloxi	Gulf Pine Catholic			Biweekly	
Mississippi	Jackson	Mississippi Catholic			Biweekly	1954
Montana	Great Falls–Billings	The Harvest			Bimonthly	1985
North Carolina	Charlotte	Catholic News Herald		58,000	Biweekly	1991
North Carolina	Raleigh	NC Catholics	Magazine		Monthly	2005
North Dakota	Bismarck	Dakota Catholic Action		23,000	Monthly	1941
North Dakota	Fargo	New Earth			Monthly	1979
Nebraska	Grand Island	West Nebraska Register			Biweekly	1930
Nebraska	Lincoln	Southern Nebraska Register		24,000	Weekly Summer: biweekly	1932
Nebraska	Omaha	The Catholic Voice			Biweekly	
New Hampshire	Manchester	Parable	Magazine		Bimonthly	
New Jersey	Camden	Catholic Star Herald				1951
New Jersey	Metuchen	The Catholic Spirit		18,000	Weekly	1996
New Jersey	Newark	The Catholic Advocate			Monthly	1951
New Jersey	Paterson	The Beacon			Weekly	
New Jersey	Trenton	The Monitor		40,000	Biweekly	
New Mexico	Gallup	Voice of the Southwest			Quarterly	1961
New Mexico	Las Cruces	Agua Viva			Bimonthly	
New Mexico	Archdiocese of Santa Fe	People of God			Monthly June–July: bimonthly	
Nevada	Las Vegas	Desert Clarion			Bimonthly	
Nevada	Reno	High Desert Catholic	Magazine		Monthly	
New York	Albany	The Evangelist		37,000	Weekly	
New York	Brooklyn	The Tablet		75,000	Weekly	1908
New York	Buffalo	The Catholic Union/The Catholic Union and Times			Weekly	25 April 1872
New York	Buffalo	Western New York Catholic		139,000	Monthly	
New York	New York	Catholic New York			Biweekly	1981
New York	Roman Catholic Diocese of Ogdensburg	North Country Catholic			Weekly	1946
New York	Rochester	Catholic Courier		107,000	Weekly	1889
New York	Rochester	El Mensajero Católico			Monthly	
New York	Rockville Centre	The Long Island Catholic			Monthly	
New York	Syracuse	The Catholic Sun		18,000	Weekly Summer: biweekly	1892
Ohio	Cincinnati	The Catholic Telegraph		148,000	Monthly	1831
Ohio	Cleveland	Northeast Ohio Catholic	Magazine	230,000	Bimonthly	2015
Ohio	Columbus	Catholic Times			Weekly	1951
Ohio	Steubenville	Steubenville Register		16,000	Biweekly	1945
Ohio	Youngstown	The Catholic Exponent		31,000	Biweekly	1944
Oklahoma	Oklahoma City	Sooner Catholic			Biweekly	
Oklahoma	Tulsa	Eastern Oklahoma Catholic	Magazine	23,000	Monthly	
Oregon	Baker	Catholic Sentinel El Centinela		15,000	Biweekly	1870
Oregon	Portland	Catholic Sentinel El Centinela			Biweekly	
Pennsylvania	Allentown	The A.D. Times			Biweekly	
Pennsylvania	Altoona–Johnstown	Catholic Register			Biweekly	
Pennsylvania	Greensburg	The Catholic Accent		44,000	Biweekly	1961
Pennsylvania	Harrisburg	The Catholic Witness			Biweekly	1966
Pennsylvania	Philadelphia	Catholic Philly		155,000	Biweekly	2013
Pennsylvania	Pittsburgh	Pittsburgh Catholic	Newspaper	111,250	Weekly	1844-2020
Pennsylvania	Pittsburgh	Pittsburgh Catholic	Magazine		Bimonthly	2021
Pennsylvania	Scranton	The Catholic Light		50,000	Triweekly	
Rhode Island	Providence	Rhode Island Catholic		27,000	Weekly	1875
Rhode Island	Providence	El Católico de Rhode Island				1993
South Carolina	Charleston	The Catholic Miscellany	Magazine	28,000	Biweekly	1997
South Dakota	Rapid City	West River Catholic			Monthly	1973
South Dakota	Sioux Falls	The Bishop's Bulletin			Monthly	
Tennessee	Knoxville	East Tennessee Catholic			Monthly	
Tennessee	Memphis	The West Tennessee Catholic			Monthly	
Tennessee	Memphis	Faith West Tennessee			Monthly	
Tennessee	Nashville	Tennessee Register				1937
Texas	Amarillo	The West Texas Catholic			Biweekly Summer: monthly	
Texas	Austin	Catholic Spirit	Magazine	85,000	10x per year July–August: bimonthly	1982
Texas	Beaumont	East Texas Catholic	Magazine		BiMonthly	2021–Present
Texas	Corpus Christi	South Texas Catholic		24,000	Biweekly	1966
Texas	Dallas	The Texas Catholic		55,000	Biweekly	
Texas	Dallas	Revista Católica				
Texas	El Paso	The Rio Grande Catholic			Monthly	
Texas	Fort Worth	North Texas Catholic		60,000	Bimonthly	1982
Texas	Galveston–Houston	Texas Catholic Herald		75,000	Monthly	
Texas	Laredo	La Fe	Magazine		12,000	Quarterly
Texas	San Angelo	West Texas Angelus			Monthly	
Texas	San Antonio	Today's Catholic Newspaper		15,000	Biweekly	1892
Texas	Tyler	Catholic East Texas	Magazine		Monthly	1987
Texas	Victoria	The Catholic Lighthouse		6,400	Monthly	1987
Utah	Salt Lake City	Intermountain Catholic				
Virginia	Arlington	Arlington Catholic Herald		70,000	Weekly	
Virginia	Richmond	The Catholic Virginian		73,000	Biweekly	
Vermont	Burlington	Vermont Catholic			Monthly	2010
Washington	Seattle	Northwest Catholic		123,000	Monthly	2013
Washington	Spokane	Inland Register				
Wisconsin	Green Bay	The Compass		18,000	Weekly Summer: biweekly	
Wisconsin	La Crosse	Catholic Life	Magazine		Monthly	2015
Wisconsin	Madison	Madison Catholic Herald				
Wisconsin	Milwaukee	The Catholic Herald				
Wisconsin	Superior	The Superior Catholic Herald		12,000	Biweekly	1953
West Virginia	Wheeling–Charleston	The Catholic Spirit			Biweekly	
Wyoming	Cheyenne	Wyoming Catholic Register				

== Non-diocesan newspapers and magazines ==
Newspaper / magazine	Circulation	Frequency	Year founded
Aleteia.org		Daily	2011
America	45,000	Monthly	1909
St. Anthony Messenger	65,000	Monthly	1893
Black Catholic Messenger		Daily	2020
Catholic Answers Magazine		Bimonthly	
Catholic Digest	300,000	Monthly	1936
Catholic Family News		Monthly	1993
The Catholic Worker	25,000	7 times a year	1933
Commonweal	20,000	Monthly	1924
Crux (online newspaper)		Weekly	2014
Homiletic and Pastoral Review		Biweekly	1900
National Catholic Register	39,000	Biweekly	1927
National Catholic Reporter	35,000	Biweekly	1964
Our Sunday Visitor	45,000	Biweekly	1912
The Pillar (online)			2021
The Remnant		Biweekly	1968
U.S. Catholic		Monthly	1936
The Wanderer		Weekly	1867
The Word Among Us	430,000	Monthly	1981
