= BCM =

BCM may refer to:

== Automotive ==
- Body Control Module, in automotive electronics

== Business ==
- Boots Contract Manufacturing, previously part of Alliance Boots
- Bravo Company Manufacturing, an American firearms manufacturing company
- Bus contracting model of Singapore, a bus industry contracting model introduced in Singapore by the Land Transport Authority
- Business Capability Model, a model showing what an organization can do
- Business Contact Manager, a Microsoft add-in product for Microsoft Outlook|Microsoft Office Outlook that adds CRM features
- Business Continuity Management, an interdisciplinary peer mentoring methodology used to create a plan for recovery of a business after disaster or disruption
- Broadcom Inc., designer, developer and global supplier of semiconductor products
  - Broadcom Corporation, subsidiary of Broadcom Inc.

=== Banks ===
- Banque Centrale de Madagascar, a financial institution in Madagascar
- Banque Centrale de Mauritanie, a financial institution in Mauritania
- Banque Commerciale du Maroc, a financial institution in Morocco that is now the Attijariwafa Bank

== Religion ==
- Baptist Church of Mizoram
- Baptist Collegiate Ministries, an entity of the Baptist Student Union at some American and Canadian colleges

== Units of measure ==
- Bank Cubic Metre (mining term), a cubic metre of rock or material in situ before it is extracted
- Billion Cubic Microns per square inch, a unit used in printing that measures the amount of ink that an anilox roll delivers to a printing plate
- Billion Cubic Metres, a unit of measure equivalent to 1 cubic kilometre, see also Orders of magnitude (one cubic kilometre to one cubic megametre)
- Billion cubic metres of natural gas, one of the common measures used in the international energy trade

== Science and medicine ==
- Baylor College of Medicine, a private medical school in Houston, Texas, USA
- BCM theory, a model of synaptic plasticity
- Blue cone monochromacy, a rare form of color-blindness
- British Chess Magazine, a magazine published in the United Kingdom
- Bromochloromethane, a mixed halomethane

== Other ==
- Bak chor mee, a Singaporean noodle dish
- Band Corporal Major, a warrant officer appointment in the bands of the British Household Cavalry
- BCM, the IATA airport code for Bacău International Airport
- Beijing Capital Museum, an art museum in Beijing, China
- Binary chemical munition, a weapon requiring two separate media to combine for activation
- Black Consciousness Movement, a political movement in apartheid South Africa
- Black Catholic Messenger, African-American Catholic newspaper
