= Robert Hoyt =

Robert Hoyt may refer to:

- Robert Hoyt (journalist) (1922–2003), American journalist
- Robert P. Hoyt (born 1968), American physicist and engineer
- Robert Hoyt (sound engineer) (1925–2012), American sound engineer

== See also ==
- Hoyt (disambiguation)
