= Black Catholic Messenger =

Catholic non-profit media publication in the U.S.

- Company type: Nonprofit
- Website type: Online newspaper
- Available in: English
- Founded: October 2020
- Country of origin: United States
- Founders: Nate Tinner-Williams; Preslaysa Williams; Alessandra Harris
- Editor: Sheila Hodges
- Parent: Black Catholic Messenger Foundation
- Website: blackcatholicmessenger.org
- Current status: Active

Black Catholic Messenger (BCM) is a nonprofit media publication covering stories of interest to African-American Catholics. Its coverage has been featured in The Philadelphia Inquirer, La Croix, The New Yorker, Black Enterprise, and The Root. BCM established a republishing partnership with the National Catholic Reporter in 2022.

== History ==
The publication was founded in New Orleans, Louisiana, in late 2020. Nate Tinner-Williams—inspired by the model of Daniel Rudd, the 19th- and 20th-century Black Catholic journalist from Ohio—formed a group of young African-American Catholics to create a publication that could possibly revive Rudd's journalistic legacy.

The group, consisting of Tinner-Williams and authors Alessandra Harris and Preslaysa Williams, began their work in October of that year. Nate Tinner-Williams serves as editor of the publication and in that capacity has been featured in NPR, CBC News, America, the National Catholic Reporter, and The Philadelphia Inquirer, among other outlets.

The publication reports on various issues in the Catholic Church and the Black community, to include politics, education, episcopal governance, racism, vocations, abuse, and notable deaths, as well as interviews and art, including photography and poetry. BCM established a republishing partnership with the National Catholic Reporter in 2022.

BCM's general coverage has been featured in The Philadelphia Inquirer, La Croix, Aleteia, Black Enterprise, The Christian Post, National Catholic Register, the New Pittsburgh Courier, the Rockford Register Star, WIFR-LD, the Catholic Worker, and the Baltimore Afro-American. In 2025, the publication was among the first to report on the Black ancestry of Pope Leo XIV, resulting in citations from The New Yorker, The Root, and other outlets. The fifth anniversary of BCM was covered by the National Press Foundation and Word in Black.

Sheila Hodges was named the new editor of Black Catholic Messenger in 2026.

== See also ==
- Black Catholicism – African-American religious group
- List of Catholic newspapers and magazines in the United States
- Daniel Rudd – Black Catholic journalist and activist
