= Flight 375 =

Flight 375 may refer to:

- Eastern Air Lines Flight 375, crashed on 4 October 1960
- VASP Flight 375, hijacked on 29 September 1988
