= Mark P. Shea =

American Catholic writer (born 1958)

Mark P. Shea (born August 5, 1958) is an American author, blogger, and speaker working in the field of Roman Catholic apologetics.

Born on August 5, 1958, and raised in Everett, Washington, Shea describes himself as a "double-jump convert[,] raised more or less as an agnostic pagan, [who] became a non-denominational Evangelical in 1979, and entered the Catholic Church in 1987".

== Blogging ==
Since June 2020, Shea has maintained the Stumbling Toward Heaven, blog. From April 2002 until May 2020, he wrote the Catholic and Enjoying It!, blog.

== Books ==
- This is My Body: An Evangelical Discovers the Real Presence (Christendom Press, 1993) ISBN 978-0931888489
- By What Authority?: An Evangelical Discovers Catholic Tradition (Ignatius Press, 1996) ISBN 978-1586177829
- Making Senses Out of Scripture: Reading the Bible as the First Christians Did (Basilica Press, 1999) ISBN 978-0964261068
- Shaken by Scandals: Catholics Speak Out About Priests' Sexual Abuse (Charis Books, 2002). ISBN 156955353X (Contributed "Chapter 9 - Dark Hour: The Long Good Friday of 2002")
- Tolkien on Film: Essays on Peter Jackson's 'The Lord of the Rings' (Mythopoeic Press, 2004). ISBN 978-1887726092 (Contributed "The Lord of the Rings: A Source-Critical Analysis")
- A Guide to the Passion: 100 Questions About The Passion of the Christ (Ascension Press, 2004) ISBN 978-1932645422
- A Guide to Narnia: 100 Questions About The Chronicles of Narnia: The Lion, the Witch, and the Wardrobe (Ascension Press, 2005) ISBN 978-1932645972
- The Da Vinci Deception: 100 Questions about the Facts and Fiction of The Da Vinci Code (Ascension Press, 2006) ISBN 978-1932927641 (co-author with Edward Sri)
- Amazing Grace for Survivors (Ascension Press, 2008). Contributed "All is Forgiven, Sadie Hawkins!". ISBN 978-1934217474
- Mary, Mother of the Son (Amazon, 2014)
- Catholic Controversies: Understanding Church Teachings and Events in History (Moorings Press, 2010) ISBN 978-0982766200 (Contributed "The Mother of the Son: The Case for Marian Devotion" and "Purgatory: Where is That in the Bible?")
- Disorientation: The 13 "isms" That Will Send You to Intellectual "La La Land" (Ascension Press, 2010) ISBN 978-1934217948 (Contributed "Americanism")
- The Church and New Media: Blogging Converts, Online Activists, and Bishops Who Tweet (Our Sunday Visitor, 2011). ISBN 978-1592760336 (Contributed "Chapter 4: - Modern Epistles: Blogging the Faith")
- The Work of Mercy: Being the Hands and Heart of Christ (Servant books, 2012) ISBN 1616360097
- The Heart of Catholic Prayer: Rediscovering the Our Father and the Hail Mary (Our Sunday Visitor, 2012) ISBN 978-1592761777
- Salt and Light: The Commandments, the Beatitudes, and a Joyful Life (Servant books, 2013) ISBN 978-1616364960
- The Church's Best-Kept Secret: A Primer on Catholic Social Teaching (New City Press, 2020) ISBN 978-1565481183

== Periodicals ==
Shea has been published in the National Catholic Register, Our Sunday Visitor, Catholic Weekly, Catholic Answers, St. Anthony Messenger, the American Spectator, Beliefnet, the Catholic World Report, New Oxford Review, The Door, and Catholic Digest.

== Radio ==
Shea's one-minute "Words of Encouragement" segments have been broadcast nationally in the United States on Ave Maria Radio.

== Podcasting ==
From 2015 to 2018, Shea hosted Connecting the Dots.

== TV ==
Shea played Innocent Smith on Dale Ahlquist's television program G. K. Chesterton: The Apostle of Common Sense, on the Eternal Word Television Network (EWTN).

Shea also appeared on EWTN in the made-for-television film adaptation of Chesterton's play The Surprise, as the captain of the guard.

In addition, Shea appeared on The Journey Home on ETWN.

== Film ==
In 2015, Shea appeared in Convinced, a documentary by Donald J. Johnson on the conversions of over 20 people to the Catholic faith.
