= Michael Sean Winters =

American journalist and writer

Michael Sean Winters is an American journalist and writer who covers politics and events in the Roman Catholic Church for the National Catholic Reporter, where his blog "Distinctly Catholic" can be found.

== Bio ==
"Distinctly Catholic" received the Catholic Press Association award for "Best Individual Blog" multiple times. Winters is also the US correspondent for The Tablet, the London-based international Catholic weekly. He is currently a Senior Fellow at the Greenberg Center for the Study of Religion in Public Life at Trinity College in Hartford, Connecticut.

Winters previously served as a visiting fellow at Catholic University's Institute for Policy Research and Catholic Studies, but is no longer connected to the institute. Prior to that, Winters wrote a daily political blog for America and was the political columnist for The Catholic World. In 2002, National Journal's Hotline asked George Stephanopoulos, "Who is the most important person in Washington nobody has ever heard of?" His response was, "Michael Sean Winters."

Winters has described himself as an "Ella Grasso Democrat," a reference to the pro-labor, pro-life, pro-Israel Governor of Connecticut in the 1970s. Winters has written in opposition to the agenda of President Donald Trump.

== Works ==
Winters's writing has appeared in The Washington Post, The New Republic, and The New York Times Magazine.

=== Books ===
- Left at the Altar: How the Democrats Lost the Catholics and How the Catholics Can Save the Democrats
- God's Right Hand: How Jerry Falwell Made God a Republican and Baptized the American Right, HarperCollins (2012)
