= Preslaysa Williams =

American actress and journalist

- Born: June 11, 1979 (age 47); Brunswick, New Jersey, USA
- Occupation: Author
- Writing career
- Notable awards: 2015 American Christian Fiction Writers Genesis Award for Short Novel
- Website: preslaysa.com

Preslaysa Williams (née Edwards; born June 11, 1979) is an American actress, journalist, and author from New Brunswick, New Jersey. She is a novelist with HarperCollins, specializing in contemporary romance and women's fiction, with a focus on diverse characters. She has been featured in The New York Times, Kirkus Reviews, Publishers Weekly, NPR, and Writer's Digest. During her acting career, she was best-known for her role as Cindy Ornette on Nickelodeon's The Mystery Files of Shelby Woo (1996-1998). She was also a panelist on Figure It Out.

== Personal life ==
Preslaysa Williams was born June 11, 1979, in Brunswick, New Jersey. Williams attended Bishop Ahr High School in Edison, New Jersey and graduated from Columbia University. She has also earned graduate degrees from the College of Charleston and Seton Hill University.

== Career ==
=== Acting ===
Williams began acting in the early 1990s where she performed under the stage name Presley Edwards. In 1990, she appeared in the Off-Broadway play, The Onliest One Who Can't Go Nowhere at the Ensemble Studio Theatre directed by the acclaimed director Woodie King, Jr and written by J.E. Franklin. She was called "appealing in the central role" by the New York Times.

She played Cindy Ornette on Nickelodeon's The Mystery Files of Shelby Woo from 1996 to 1998, and in 1997 was a panelist on the game show Figure It Out. In 1999, she acted as Gertrude in the Horton Foote play The Death of Papa, which was part of a series of plays called The Orphans' Home Cycle.

=== Novelist ===
==== Self-published ====
In November 2018, Williams released her debut short story, Touched by Fate, the first work in the Lowcountry Bride continuity. In November 2019, Williams released her debut novel, Healing Hannah's Heart, a fictional romance novel. She was included in two Luxe romance anthologies thereafter, in 2018 and again in 2019.

==== HarperCollins ====
In early 2020, it was announced by Publishers Weekly that Williams had signed a book deal with Avon Books (a romance imprint of HarperCollins) as part of the #OwnVoices initiative. Her first novel under the deal, A Lowcountry Bride, was released June 2021. A sequel was released in 2022, A Sweet Lowcountry Proposal, and a third novel in the series is due in 2024.

Williams has been noted as "carving out [her] place on the American bookshelf with own-voices diaspora heroines."

=== Journalism ===
In 2020, Williams co-founded Black Catholic Messenger, a nonprofit media publication covering stories of interest to African American Catholics. She has also written for Literary Hub.

== Awards and recognition ==
Williams' writing accolades include the 2015 American Christian Fiction Writers Genesis Award for Short Novel (for her work "Coming Home to Love"), and the Indiana Romance Writers of America's Golden Opportunity Award.

Williams has been featured in Publishers Weekly, Kirkus Reviews, NPR, The Root, Boston.com, Writer's Digest, and Columbia Magazine.

== Bibliography ==
- A Lowcountry Bride: A Novel. New York: HarperCollins, 2021. ISBN 9781665096447
- A Sweet Lowcountry Proposal: A Novel. New York: HarperCollins, 2022. ISBN 9780063236981
- A Wedding in the Lowcountry: A Novel. New York: HarperCollins. (expected 2025)

== Filmography ==
=== TV ===
Year	Title	Role	notes
1996	Weinerville Election Special:From Washington B.C.	Liberty Brown	
1996-1998	The Mystery Files of Shelby Woo	Cindy Ornette	
1997	Figure It Out	herself	
2017	This Is Us	college student (uncredited)	
2018	Homeland (TV series)	various uncredited roles	

=== Theater ===
Year	Title	Role	notes
1990	The Onliest One Who Can't Go Nowhere	Addie	Off-Broadway
1994	Joan of Arc	Joan of Arc	
1999	The Death of Papa	Gertrude	

=== Film ===
Year	Title	Role	notes
2020	Last Moment of Clarity	Yoga-woman (uncredited)	
