= Peachy Keenan =

American cultural commentator

Peachy Keenan is the pseudonym of an American cultural commentator. She is known for her critiques of modern feminism and advocacy for traditional family life. In 2023, she authored the book Domestic Extremist: A Practical Guide to Winning the Culture War. The book calls for a return to traditional family values. In 2026 she published SuperVillains: Architects of America's Decline, which investigates people in positions of power who Keenan argues wield ideologies to create chaos and destroy the country.

She is based in Southern California. She is the mother of five children.

== Publications ==
- Keenan, Peachy (June 2023). Domestic Extremist: A Practical Guide to Winning the Culture War. Washington, D.C.: Regnery. ISBN 978-1-68451-352-9.
- Keenan, Peachy (September 2026). SuperVillains: Architects of America's Decline. Los Angeles, CA: Passage Press. ISBN 979-8901-1-60220.

== See also ==
- Tradwife – Woman promoting traditional gender roles
