= Morris Air =

Low-cost airline of the United States (1984–1992)

IATA	ICAO	Call sign
KN	MSS	WASATCH
- Founded: 1984 (as Morris Air Service)
- Ceased operations: June 1, 1994 (merged into Southwest Airlines)
- Hubs: Salt Lake City International Airport
- Fleet size: 21, all Boeing 737
- Destinations: 21, western U.S.
- Headquarters: Salt Lake City, Utah, U.S.
- Key people: David Neeleman (president)
- Founder: June Morris (CEO)
- Revenue: $116 million (1992)
- Profit: $5.3 million (1992)
- Employees: 2,000 (1993)

Morris Air was a low-fare airline in the Western United States, based in Salt Lake City, Utah. It began scheduled operations in 1992, and was sold to Southwest Airlines in December 1993 for over $120 million in stock. The airline officially became part of Southwest in the autumn of 1994. Morris Air was the first airline in the world to invent e-ticket (ticketless) travel based on the suggestion of Stuart Thatcher, an employee at the time. Although Southwest Airlines is often credited with offering the first e-ticketing system, it was in fact created and implemented by Morris Air and later integrated into Southwest Airlines after Southwest purchased Morris Air.

== History ==
The airline began charter operations as Morris Air Service in 1984. It was launched by Utah businesswoman June Morris, who also founded Morris Travel in 1970, and David Neeleman who also co-founded WestJet and JetBlue. Neeleman worked with Southwest for a short period and when his non-compete agreement expired, he founded JetBlue Airways. June Morris sat on the board of directors of Southwest Airlines until she retired at the annual shareholders' meeting on May 17, 2006.

Charter flights were operated by Ryan International Airlines during 1992, and by both Ryan International and Sierra Pacific Airlines with some flights being operated with Boeing 737-200 jets before 1992.

Morris obtained its own FAR 121 operating certificate in December 1992 and then began operating as its own carrier.

The airline was based at Salt Lake City International Airport where it operated a hub and flew many routes primarily in the western U.S. using Boeing 737-300 aircraft. In late 1993, it operated over 1,000 flights per week with a fleet of 21 planes.

== Destinations ==
The following destination information is taken from Morris Air route maps with the airline not serving all of these airports at the same time.

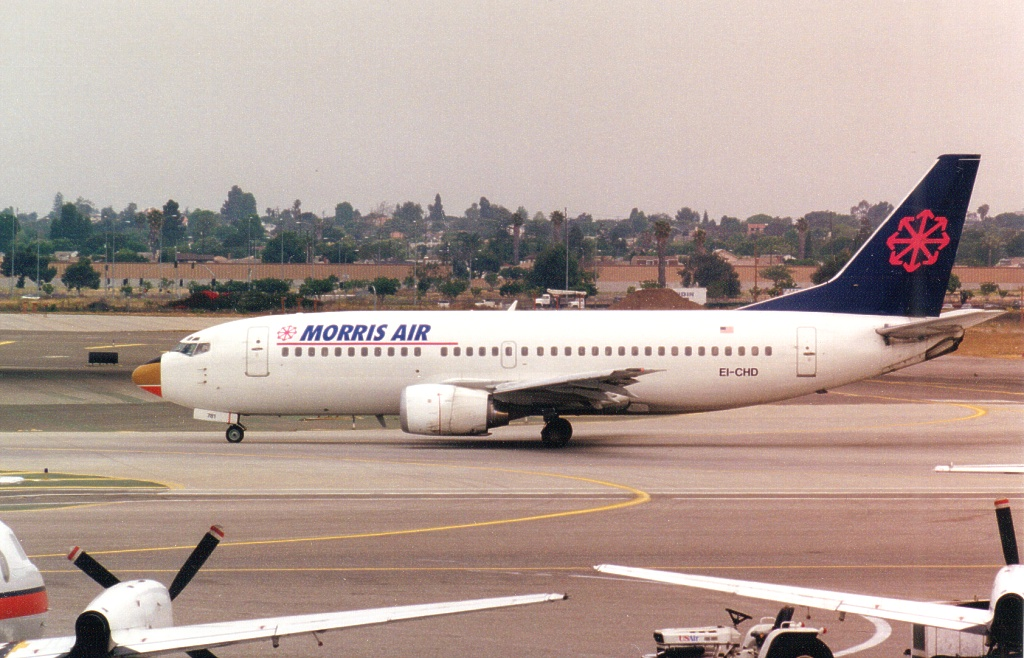
Morris Air Boeing 737-300 at LAX post-merger; note the nose with Southwest colors on the radome. This aircraft was involved in VASP Flight 375

- Alaska
  - Anchorage – Ted Stevens Anchorage International Airport
- Arizona
  - Bullhead City – Laughlin/Bullhead International Airport
  - Phoenix – Phoenix Sky Harbor International Airport
  - Tucson – Tucson International Airport
- California
  - Fresno – Fresno Yosemite International Airport
  - Los Angeles – Los Angeles International Airport
  - Oakland – Oakland San Francisco Bay Airport
  - Ontario – Ontario International Airport
  - Palm Springs – Palm Springs International Airport
  - Sacramento – Sacramento International Airport
  - San Diego – San Diego International Airport
  - San Jose – San Jose Mineta International Airport
  - Santa Ana – John Wayne Airport
- Colorado
  - Colorado Springs – Colorado Springs Airport
  - Denver – Stapleton International Airport
- Florida
  - Orlando – Orlando International Airport (seasonal)
- Hawaii
  - Honolulu – Daniel K. Inouye International Airport (seasonal) – flights to and from Hawaii operated on behalf of Morris Air by American Trans Air (ATA)
- Idaho
  - Boise –Boise Airport
  - Twin Falls – Magic Valley Regional Airport
- Nevada
  - Las Vegas – Harry Reid International Airport
  - Reno – Reno–Tahoe International Airport
- Oregon
  - Eugene – Eugene Airport
  - Portland – Portland International Airport
- Utah
  - Salt Lake City – Salt Lake City International Airport
- Washington
  - Seattle – Seattle–Tacoma International Airport
  - Spokane – Spokane International Airport
- Mexico (seasonal)
  - Cancún – Cancún International Airport
  - Cabo San Lucas – Los Cabos International Airport
  - Mazatlan – Mazatlán International Airport
  - Manzanillo – Playa de Oro International Airport
  - Puerto Vallarta – Licenciado Gustavo Díaz Ordaz International Airport

== Fleet ==
- 21 - Boeing 737-300

== See also ==
- List of defunct airlines of the United States
