= Tradwife =

Woman promoting traditional gender roles

A tradwife (a portmanteau of the words traditional and wife) is a member of an internet subculture made up of women who promote traditional gender roles, often on social media.

Tradwife aesthetics have been associated with far-right politics, particularly the alt-right and alt-lite movements. Researchers have identified differing political views among tradwives, ranging from conservatism to right-wing extremism.

== Terminology ==
The term tradwife is a portmanteau of the words traditional and wife. The term emerged within the early 2020s to describe creators like Nara Smith and Hannah Neeleman (of Ballerina Farm). Though the idea of a traditional wife has been continually present through history, it became a distinct movement or subculture, including but not only on social media, during the 2020s. It was partially born out of the number of women that felt unseen by the fourth wave of feminism that mainly centers awareness for sexual assault, but has been interpreted to mainly apply to women in the workplace.

== History ==
As a hashtag and aesthetic, #tradwife has gained a lot of traction on social media, particularly TikTok. Many creators have gone viral for videos performing domestic labor such as cooking, cleaning, and caring for children. The videos often involve an aesthetic that is purported to be reminiscent of a housewife during the 1950s, Western Expansion of the American Frontier or the Victorian era. A large number of people felt seen by the increased content of "tradwives" on social media and began to identify with the rejection of working. One of the pioneers of the idea of "tradwife", Alena Kate Pettitt, wrote two books on the subject of being a woman in the home and not in the workforce. She rose to fame during a 2020 interview with BBC News where she expressed her desire to serve her husband. However, as Pettitt watched the "tradwife" aesthetic grow, she stated that it had "become its own monster".

== Aesthetics ==
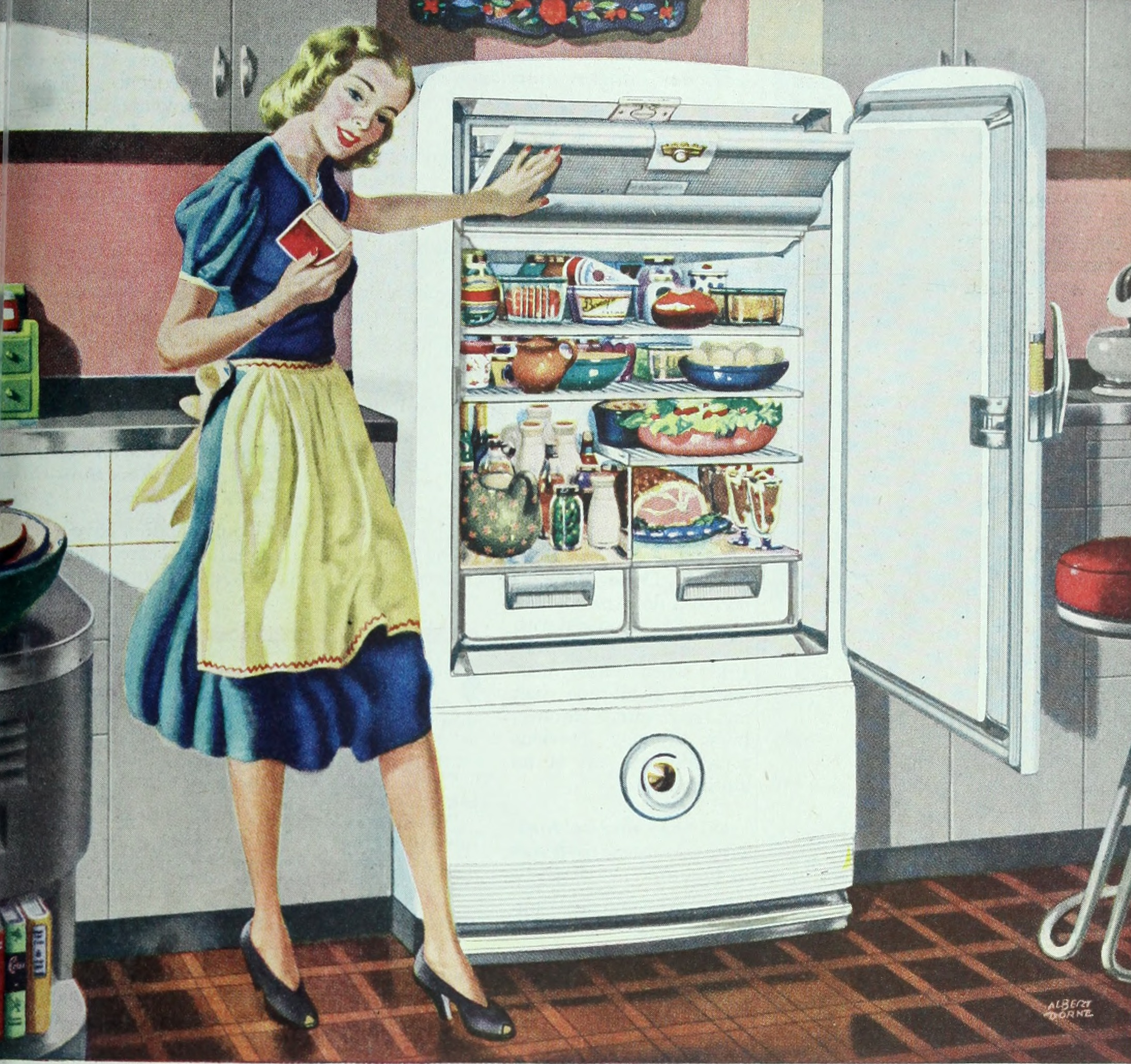
A Frigidaire refrigerator advertisement from The Ladies' Home Journal represents the lifestyle idealized by many tradwives.

The tradwife subculture is based on advocating for traditional values, and, in particular, a 'traditional' view of wives as mothers and homemakers.

Tradwives are diverse demographically, and may have a variety of cultural inspirations. Influences on the trend range from 1950s-era American culture, Christian religious values, conservative politics, choice feminism, and neopaganism. Tradwives also often draw from cottagecore visuals, particularly those that reference the prairie-style self-sufficiency associated with the expansion of the American frontier.

One key aspect of appearing to be a tradwife is reclaiming—or at least appearing to reclaim—some leisure time, because women, and especially mothers, who earn an income often have a double burden.

=== Consumer choices ===
The tradwife aesthetic tends to glamorize a retro aesthetic from white suburbia in the 1950s. She may wear a dress, an apron, and high heels. Her house may be decorated in trendy pastel colors. The tradwife aesthetic has a significant influence on home decorating. Others may prefer a back to nature appearance.

=== Social media ===
The tradwife movement is a social media-based subculture that many conservatives or far-right extremists often push. Multiple platforms, notably TikTok, Instagram, and YouTube, are used to commodify and spread the conservative ideologies underpinning the movement. Platforms such as Reddit and 4chan are also used to promote traditional heterosexual relationships. Influencer marketing strategies, the showcasing of private lives, and contemporary social media use promote the commercialisation of traditional heteronormativity and gendered relationships. The traditional housewife aesthetic has spread across the Internet in part through social media.

The rising success of contemporary tradwives is driven by clever and active use of social media and persistent positioning as online influencers. Videos with titles like "a day in my life" showcasing activities such as cooking from scratch, cleaning, caring for children, packing the lunches of their working husbands, advocating for gender roles wherein the man holds social and political power, and women, for the most part, are confined to the home as a wife and mother.

==== Critique ====
Social media influencers promoting a tradwife lifestyle have been scrutinized for alleged superficiality, including by former tradwife influencers. A controversy occurred in the tradwife community in February 2025, when the owner of the account "Patriarchy Hannah" on X, who was popular in the community, apologized for "misleading followers into thinking the account owner was an ultraconservative married mother of 14". History professor Marissa C. Rhodes wrote that many tradwife social media influencers promote incorrect beliefs about how women lived during the 19th and early 20th century.

== Practices ==
Key to the tradwife identity is being a stay-at-home wife or a stay-at-home mother and the various activities involved in managing the household, such as cooking, cleaning, managing laundry, and tending to vegetables. Additionally, special attention is paid to the importance of raising children. Some self-identified tradwives choose to take a homemaking role within their marriage, and others leave their careers to focus on meeting their family's needs in the home.

A report in America magazine, a Catholic publication, has also reported that some Catholic tradwives have adopted the practice of wearing veils at mass, a practice embraced by some Catholic women as a means of reverence and empowerment.

One suggested reason for the criticism of tradwives is that they are reviled for appearing to truly live out an idealized home life in practice, when most social media users only achieve the superficial appearance (e.g., through a decision to wear a retro dress or to buy a trendy kitchen item).

== Finances ==
Some women who identify as tradwives prefer a division of labor wherein their husband manages family finances more broadly while they focus on managing food and household consumables.

However, many of the tradwife internet celebrities earn an income outside the home, in addition to running their influencer businesses on social media. For example, Hannah Neeleman runs food-related businesses with her husband, and Nara Smith is a professional model.

== Backlash to women in the workforce ==
Perhaps an equal and opposite identity to the tradwife is the girlboss. Originally popularized by the Tumblr and Instagram subcultures in the late 2010s, the term "girlboss" was initially used to empower women in leadership and entrepreneurship, aligning with broader feminist ideals. However, over time, the term evolved into a symbol for specifically White feminism that often focuses on individual success without challenging the underlying structures of power, such as the capitalist heteropatriarchy. It tends to prioritize acquiring wealth and social status for oneself, potentially undermining collective feminist goals aimed at systemic change. In response, tradwives emerged partially as a counterculture movement to the girlboss phenomenon, advocating for women who choose traditional roles such as homemaking and motherhood, often emphasizing values like family, stability, and community, and expressing a desire to reject the individualistic and entrepreneurial ideals associated with the girlboss movement.

Tradwife ideals advocate against wives and mothers working outside the home. However, this ideal fails to account for the work and labor involved in the home and in raising children. People who choose to stay at home rather than participate in the workforce make a significant contribution to society's functioning, often without receiving compensation for this labor. Domestic labor includes cleaning, cooking, laundry, childcare, household maintenance, and significant emotion work. The performances often seen on social media of tradwives rarely display the amount of tedious and difficult labor that goes into being a stay-at-home parent or homemaker. The nature of social media creates an environment where the content circulated is an idealized and carefully curated image that does not portray the effort and labor that go into the work being done, as well as the work of creating content itself.

Tradwife ideals hold that wives should be financially dependent on their husbands. There is a certain element of deception to this claim because high-profile tradwives may generate financial gain through creating social media content. Furthermore, historically and currently, the tradwife ideal is often associated with a certain level of wealth. The amount of wealth required to support a family, particularly to the aesthetic standards that traditional homemakers display, is substantial. However, many of the tradwives that portray life as a homemaker generate wealth that they frequently do not talk about.

Many influencers have monetized their lives as tradwifes through brand deals and partnerships, merchandise, and promoting products for which they receive a commission. Nara Smith and Hannah Neeleman have jobs, yet they perform as traditional homemakers, also known as tradwives. Hannah Neeleman, who has been referred to as "Queen of the Tradwives", espouses wanting a different lifestyle from the aforementioned "girlboss", similarly to the other tradwives. However, Neeleman is co-CEO of her and her husband's company, Ballerina Farm. Their work, as well as that of other influencers, involves real labor in creating videos and marketing themselves; however, they perpetuate a narrative that discredits and hides their influencer careers. Furthermore, these influencers, who have their own sources of income, cannot be compared to the homemakers of the 1950s, who were unable to acquire their own money or even have a credit card in their own name. It perpetuates misinformation about the tradwife lifestyle as well as discrediting the work they do.

== Demographics ==
=== Racial balance ===
A 2025 study sampled 61 tradwife influencers on TikTok, finding that approximately half of them were white, while the other half were not. Several influencers who self-identify as tradwives have also been found to push anti-immigration and even white supremacist narratives, such as the white genocide conspiracy theory.

Refinery29 reported that a growing number of Black women are embracing traditional marriage, not explicitly using the "tradwife" neologism, but instead framing their identity within a "submissive" or "biblical" marriage. These Black women argue that traditional marriage is the "key to liberation from being overworked, economic insecurity, and the stress of trying to survive in a world hostile to our survival and existence". This perspective has been criticized as lacking awareness of broader structural and social issues in American capitalism.

=== Political orientation ===
Tradwives have been linked to the alt-right movement. Other researchers have identified a wide range of political views among tradwives, which, while primarily conservative, range from the moderate to the extreme.

Despite their broader link to extreme right-wing ideologies, not all tradwives endorse extreme ideas, and ideology is not an integral part of the subculture. Prominent British tradwife and influencer Alena Pettitt posted on social media in 2020 that she was "dumbfounded" by the media's "smear campaign" against tradwives, arguing they were all being unfairly linked to extremism. Historian Kristy Campion of Charles Sturt University has cautioned against "denouncing all tradwives as far-right extremists", saying that, for many women, embracing a "traditional wife" lifestyle was a personal choice unconnected to a specific ideology.

Seyward Darby discussed the tradwife aesthetic in her 2020 book, Sisters in Hate: American Women and White Extremism, and shared interviews with women who identify as traditional. She found that some women in the movement espoused tenets of the American far right, including white supremacy, antisemitism, populism, and ultraconservatism.

One 2025 study found a diversity of ideological beliefs among TikTok tradwife influencers, with the exception that anti-feminism was common across the group.

Published in 2024, Trump's Project 2025 outlines a default structure for American life. This structure includes the push for women's sole role as mothers. With the government outlining what is said to be an ideal family, through the media, some women have responded by embracing this culture. As outlined in an article in The New Yorker, self-proclaimed "Advocate for Women" Alena Kate Pettitt has contributed to this by discussing her ambitions to serve her husband and claiming that women like her would have thrived in the 1950s, a time when she states that "Everyone wouldn't be asking me [Pettitt] when I'm going back to work."

According to Wired in 2026, more and more wealthy young American men are tending to look for tradwives as partners, not only in red states, but also in blue states.

It has been argued from a Black feminist perspective that the tradwife inherently promotes alt-right and far-right ideals through the promotion of traditional values that are closely connected to ideals of White supremacy.

Though many of the tradwife influencers do not directly address politics or outright endorse any politicians, they have contributed towards an alt- and far-right shift by virtue of being "apolitical". Many far-right tradwife influencers either avoid discussing politics openly or state that they will stop doing so once they get married and start their family. Though this is seemingly apolitical, it functions as a tactic to perpetuate the right's ideologies of traditionalist conservatism, White supremacy, and misogyny. By virtue of being influencers, defined as "a person who is able to generate interest in something (such as a consumer product) by posting about it on social media", tradwives drive their viewers' likelihood of purchasing advertised products and assuming their lifestyle. As stated by British journalist Hadley Freeman, "It is especially popular among White supremacists, who are extremely down with the message that White women should submit to their husband and focus on making as many White babies as possible".

=== Relationship with feminism ===
The tradwife philosophy has a complicated relationship with feminism, being at times criticized and supported by feminists. Some who follow the tradwife aesthetic suggest that it is a form of anti-feminism, advocating for a return to "simpler" times and traditional family systems.

Critics often argue that tradwives embody toxic femininity and internalized sexism.

== See also ==
- Barefoot and pregnant – Phrase promoting the housewifery of women
- "Be fruitful and multiply" – Biblical phrase
- Complementarianism – Theological view on gender roles
- Cottagecore – Aesthetic of nostalgia popular among youths
- Culture of Domesticity – 19th-century value system for American women
- Home Economics – Study of household management
- Kinder, Küche, Kirche – Expression of traditional gender roles for women
- Natalism – Belief that promotes human reproduction
- Peachy Keenan – American cultural commentator
- Quiverfull – Pro-natalist Christian movement
- Separate spheres – Gendered separation of public and private spheres
- Yesteryear – 2026 debut novel by Caro Claire Burke
