= The Mystery Files of Shelby Woo =

- Genre: Mystery
- Created by: Alan Goodman
- Starring: Irene Ng; Pat Morita; Adam Busch; Preslaysa Edwards; Steve Purnick; Jeremy Lakemacher; Ellen David; Eleanor Noble; Noah Klar
- Composer: Bill Johnson
- Countries of origin: United States; Canada
- No. of seasons: 4
- No. of episodes: 41

Production
- Executive producers: Alan Goodman; Micheline Charest; Ronald A. Weinberg
- Producers: Angelika Bartenbach-Kidd; Jim Burns; Stewart Harding
- Camera setup: Single-camera
- Running time: 30 minutes
- Production companies: Out of My Mind Productions; Nickelodeon Productions; CINAR Corporation

Original release
- Network: Nickelodeon
- Release: March 16, 1996 – April 4, 1999

The Mystery Files of Shelby Woo is a mystery television series that ran on Nickelodeon between 1996 and 1999. A total of 41 episodes of 30 minutes each were produced. Episodes from the first three seasons were taped at Nickelodeon Studios at Universal Studios in Orlando, Florida, and was one of the few single-camera productions there, while the final season's episodes were shot in Montreal, Quebec, Canada.

== History ==
The series first aired in March 1996 as a six-episode test run, since Nickelodeon usually produced one major new series at a time and they were already producing Space Cases. The success of the test run prompted Nickelodeon to re-introduce the series on SNICK in January 1997, along with seven new episodes. During the show's third season, production stopped after eight of a proposed thirteen episodes were filmed due to a crew strike, as the show's budget did not cover the International Alliance of Theatrical Stage Employees's demands, partly due to the decision to shoot film instead of videotape. Production resumed in Montreal in February 1998, after Cinar agreed to co-produce the series. As a result, the show's setting changed from Cocoa Beach, Florida, to Boston, Massachusetts.

== Premise ==
Shelby Woo is a Chinese American teenage girl who lives with her innkeeper grandfather and works as a non-sworn intern at the local police department where she helps out with odds and ends around the office. Occasionally an intriguing case comes to Shelby's attention, prompting her to apply her unique insight and enlist the help of her friends to solve it. Her supervisors, however, do not appreciate her help, as she is only a teenager. Her grandfather also does not want her getting involved in cases, often reminding her "We are not detectives with warrant badges, we are innkeepers with brooms." Many of the stories, with three clear suspects, keep the audience guessing until the truth is ultimately explained.

== Cast ==
=== Primary characters ===
- Shelby Woo (Irene Ng): Main protagonist of the show, who solves mysteries and is an overachiever. She lives in Cocoa Beach, Florida in Seasons 1-3 and moved to Boston with her grandfather in Season 4. Despite Shelby being portrayed as a teenager, in reality, Ng was 21 when the series began and was close to 25 by the end of the series. Shelby's parents are not seen though are mentioned in episode "Hot Seats" to be in China after Shelby receives a package from them.
- Michael "Mike" Woo (Pat Morita): Shelby's loving grandfather and legal guardian who is looking after Shelby while her parents are in China. He is a practical retired detective with the San Francisco PD. Mike does not want Shelby to solve mysteries because he is afraid that she will get hurt.
- Cindy Ornette (Preslaysa Edwards): Shelby's perky best friend in Cocoa Beach; like Shelby, she likes getting involved in cases. Cindy is close to her cousin Wayne.
- Noah Allen (Adam Busch): Shelby's other best friend in Cocoa Beach; he does not like getting involved in cases. Noah wants to be an actor.
- Detective Whit Hineline (Steve Purnick): Works at the Cocoa Beach PD; he is Shelby's sarcastic former boss and does not like her interfering in his investigations. Detective Hineline does care about Shelby's well-being.
- Detective Sharon Delancey (Ellen David): Works at the Boston PD, and is Shelby's new boss. While she is not thrilled with Shelby's help, she is more accepting of it than Detective Hineline was.
- Angela "Angie" Burns (Eleanor Noble): Shelby's new best friend from Boston who replaces Cindy; very good at science and applies that knowledge in certain cases.
- Vincent "Vince" Rosania (Noah Klar): Shelby's other new best friend from Boston who replaces Noah; a talented mechanic who was originally a suspect in one of Shelby's first cases in Boston. He becomes Shelby's love interest.

=== Recurring characters ===
- Detective Muldoon (Angelo Tsarouchas): heavy set detective who assists Shelby in a few cases in Detective Delancey's absence; does needlepoint.
- Will (Joshua Harto): works at CJ's burger joint where Shelby and her friends hang out in Cocoa Beach; known for breaking things or coming up with poorly-thought-out ideas.
- Christie Sayers (Jennifer Finnigan): Shelby's nemesis who is determined to solve a case before she does and fails each time; only appears in season 4.

== Episodes ==
=== Series overview ===
Season	Episodes	Originally released	
Season	Episodes	First released	Last released
1	6	March 16, 1996	April 21, 1996
2	7	January 4, 1997	February 22, 1997
3	8	September 28, 1997	August 27, 1998
4	20	September 6, 1998	April 4, 1999

=== Season 1 (1996) ===
No. overall	No. in season	Title	Directed by	Written by	Original release date	Prod. code
1	1	"Fool's Gold"	Chuck Vinson	James Ponti & Paul Stubenrauch	March 16, 1996	104
A priceless gold coin is stolen from a local surf shop.
2	2	"The Missing Dolphin"	Chuck Vinson	Eric Weiner	March 24, 1996	105
A popular dolphin vanishes from a research facility in Cocoa Beach.
3	3	"Wipeout"	Maggie Greenwald	Joyce Wadler	March 31, 1996	103
When a local surf champ is poisoned, his rival is blamed. Shelby must prove the man's innocence.
4	4	"The Missing Astronaut"	Chuck Vinson	Carin Greenberg Baker	April 7, 1996	106
A NASA astronaut is kidnapped during a party held in his honor at Shelby's own house.
5	5	"Hot Seats"	Maggie Greenwald	Alan Goodman	April 14, 1996	101
Shelby must clear a scalper's name when he's framed for giving out counterfeit concert tickets.
6	6	"Hot Seats - Part 2"	Maggie Greenwald	Alan Goodman	April 21, 1996	102
Conclusion. The mystery tightens when the young man accused of selling fake tickets vanishes.

=== Season 2 (1997) ===
No. overall	No. in season	Title	Directed by	Written by	Original release date	Prod. code
7	1	"The Alligator Mystery"	Chuck Vinson	Suzanne Collins	January 4, 1997	207
A gambling addict goes missing in an alligator park.
8	2	"The Alley Cat"	Chuck Vinson	Alan Goodman	January 11, 1997	209
A criminal who eluded Shelby's grandfather resurfaces.
9	3	"Tag, Not It"	Chuck Vinson	James Ponti	January 18, 1997	211
Shelby, Cindi, and Noah must clear Cindi's cousin's name when he's framed for graffiti.
10	4	"The Smoke Screen Case"	Allison Liddi	Suzanne Collins	January 25, 1997	210
Shelby investigates an arson that covered up the disappearances of animals.
11	5	"Two Faced"	Allison Liddi	Marty Stevens-Heebner	February 1, 1997	213
It is a case of mistaken identity when Noah is kidnapped due to his resemblance to a son of a scientist.
12	6	"Eye of the Storm"	Maggie Greenwald	James Ponti	February 15, 1997	208
During a hurricane, a valuable watch is stolen from its safe.
13	7	"The Case of the Knockout Gas"	Maggie Greenwald	Susan Kim	February 22, 1997	212
Cashiers at local mini-marts are being knocked unconscious by gas seeping through air vents. Who is responsible?

=== Season 3 (1997–98) ===
No. overall	No. in season	Title	Directed by	Written by	Original release date	Prod. code
14	1	"The Macbeth Mystery"	Maggie Greenwald	Susan Kim	September 28, 1997	320
Accidents begin to plague a play.
15	2	"The Hit and Run Case"	Allison Liddi	Suzanne Collins	October 5, 1997	314
Detective Hineline is framed for a hit and run.
16	3	"Mystery in the Wilderness"	Allison Liddi	Alan Goodman	October 12, 1997	316
A thief steals a computer chip during Shelby, Cindi, and Noah's nature trip.
17	4	"The Mascot Mystery"	Maggie Greenwald	James Ponti	October 26, 1997	317
The school mascot assaults the soccer champ.
18	5	"The Hot Dog Mystery"	Allison Liddi	Bobby Bowman	November 2, 1997	319
Students get sick from eating the school's hot dogs.
19	6	"The Shell Game Mystery"	Allison Liddi	James Ponti	January 4, 1998	315
Someone takes advantage of a campaign to help sea turtles to commit robberies.
20	7	"The John Doe Mystery"	Directed by: Maggie Greenwald; Additional scenes: Adam Weissman	James Ponti	August 25, 1998	TBA
An amnesiac man may play a role in the search for a missing satellite
21	8	"The Seminole Mystery"	Directed by: Maggie Greenwald; Additional scenes: Adam Weissman	Suzanne Collins	August 27, 1998	TBA
An authentic Seminole weapon is stolen.

=== Season 4 (1998–99) ===
No. overall	No. in season	Title	Directed by	Written by	Original release date	Prod. code
22	1	"The Paul Revere Mystery"	Adam Weissman	Alan Goodman	September 6, 1998	TBA
Shelby is a suspect when someone steals a silver bowl made by Paul Revere.
23	2	"The Spare Parts Mystery"	Adam Weissman	Suzanne Collins	September 13, 1998	TBA
Shelby has to find who has been stealing parts from cars being worked on at the school's auto shop.
TBA	TBA	"The Toy Store Mystery"	Allison Liddi	Beth Stewart	TBA	TBA
A popular doll and its accessories begin to malfunction.
TBA	TBA	"The Skin Deep Mystery"	Lorette Leblanc	Steve Purnick & Danno Sullivan	TBA	TBA
Shelby goes undercover at a beauty pageant where mysterious accidents are occurring.
TBA	TBA	"The UFO Mystery"	Lorette Leblanc	Susan Kim	TBA	TBA
Shelby sets out to disprove a UFO sighting.
TBA	TBA	"The Robot Mystery"	Jim Donovan	David Hoffman	TBA	TBA
A brilliant inventor has been attacked, and some of his blueprints have been stolen.
TBA	TBA	"The Haunted House Mystery"	Lorette Leblanc	Robert Bowman	TBA	TBA
Shelby helps a woman who believes her house is being haunted.
TBA	TBA	"The Big Cheese Mystery"	Jim Donovan	Carin Greenberg Baker	TBA	TBA
A bank robber wears a cheese costume from a popular children's show while committing the crime.
TBA	TBA	"The Racetrack Mystery"	Adam Weissman	Matthew Salsberg	November 15, 1998	TBA
A race horse about to retire goes missing.
TBA	TBA	"The Art Attack Mystery"	Jean-Marie Comeau	Heather Conkie	TBA	TBA
A new outdoor art exhibit has been trashed and the artist disappears shortly thereafter.
TBA	TBA	"The Mystery of The Mice That Roared"	Allison Liddi	John Boni	December 20, 1998	TBA
Someone is playing pranks on the diners at a new restaurant.
TBA	TBA	"The Jinxed Campaign Mystery"	Jean-Marie Comeau	Susan Kim	January 3, 1999	TBA
Shelby gets involved with politics when someone tries to get a mayor candidate to drop from the race.
TBA	TBA	"The Moon Rock Mystery"	Adam Weissman	James Ponti	TBA	TBA
A rock from the Moon is stolen from an exhibit at a space camp.
TBA	TBA	"The Itchy Shorts Mystery"	Adam Weissman	Susin Nielsen	TBA	TBA
Someone has stolen the basketball team's money and put itching powder in their uniforms.
TBA	TBA	"The Baseball Fan Mystery"	Adam Weissman	Peter Bakalian	January 31, 1999	TBA
Shelby investigates the disappearance of four valuable baseball cards.
TBA	TBA	"The Movie Star Mystery"	Lorette Leblanc	Dennise Fordham	February 7, 1999	TBA
When a detective movie is being filmed in town, one of the stars goes missing, and Shelby is on the case.
TBA	TBA	"The Mystery Under Our Noses"	Adam Weissman	Alan Goodman	February 21, 1999	TBA
When the President of the United States is planning a visit, the itinerary is stolen from the police station.
TBA	TBA	"The Train Mystery"	Lorette Leblanc	John Boni	February 28, 1999	TBA
An architect is thrown off of a train on a trip from Boston to Washington DC.
TBA	TBA	"The Yearbook Mystery"	Lorette Leblanc	David Preston & Edith Rey	TBA	TBA
Shelby and her friends investigate why page 86 is missing from most of the yearbooks.
TBA	TBA	"The Egg Mystery"	Adam Weissman	Suzanne Collins & James Ponti	April 4, 1999	TBA
In 1926, a priceless Faberge egg vanished from what later became the Easterly Breeze. 70 years later, Shelby's grandfather attempts to reenact the crime.

== Broadcast ==
The series originally aired from March 16, 1996 to April 4, 1999 on Nickelodeon in the United States. After its final episode, it continued airing in reruns until July 15, 2001.

On December 29, 2011, TeenNick aired the episode "The Smoke Screen Case" on The '90s Are All That block. The series later had intermittent airings from October 29, 2015 to March 21, 2016 on The '90s Are All That's successor block, The Splat.

== Home media ==
All 12 episodes from seasons 1 and 2 are available for purchase on the iTunes Store and Amazon Video. Season 2 is available for purchase on Fandango at Home.

On November 24, 2014, the entire series was released on DVD exclusive to Amazon.com in region 1.
