= David Neeleman =

American aviation entrepreneur (born 1959)

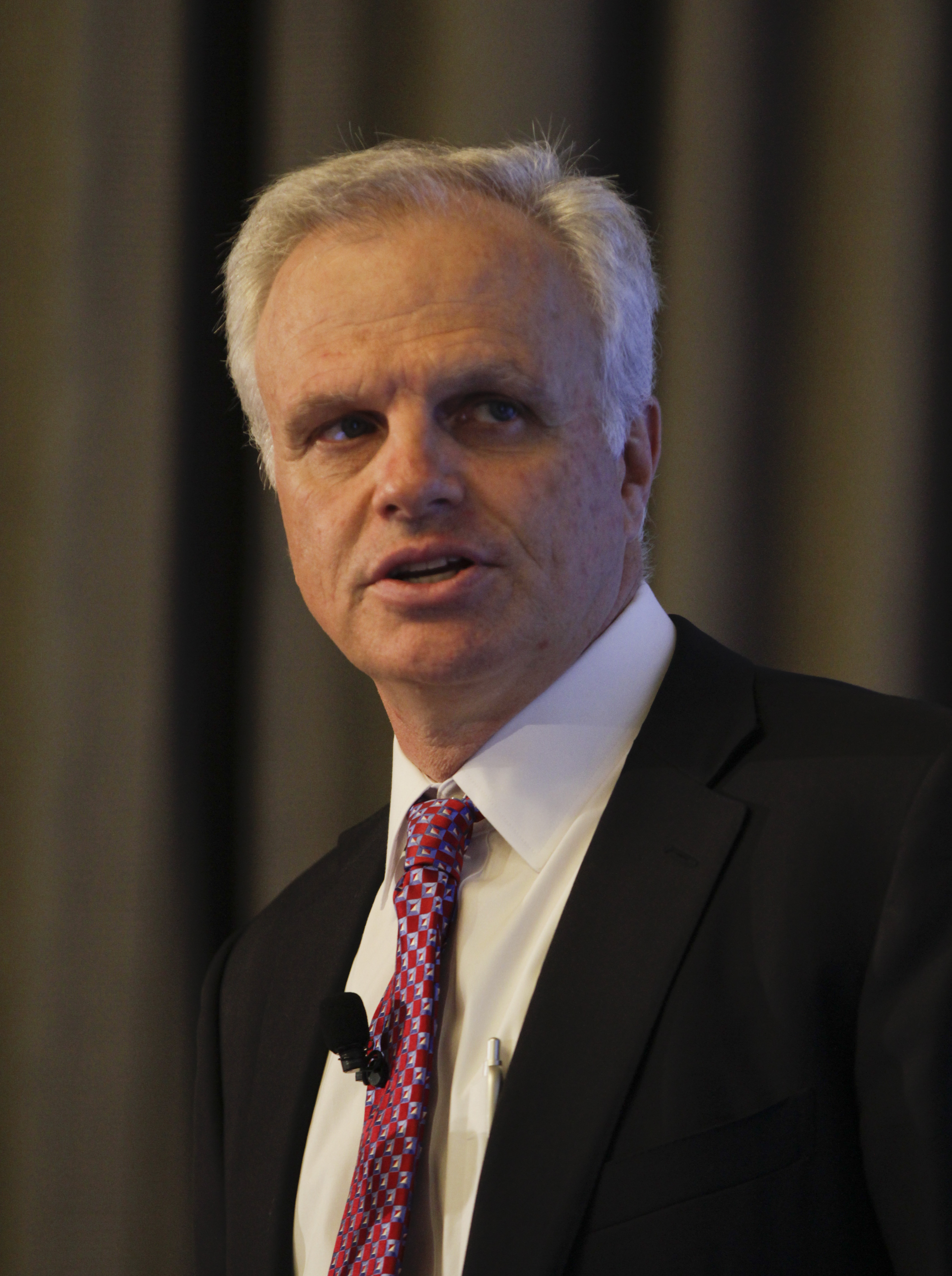
- Neeleman in 2015
- Born: October 16, 1959 (age 67); São Paulo, Brazil
- Citizenship: Brazil; United States; Cyprus
- Occupations: Chairman of Azul Brazilian Airlines; CEO of Breeze Airways
- Known for: Commercial airline entrepreneur
- Board member of: Azul Brazilian Airlines; Azorra; JetBlue (former)
- Spouse: Vicki Vranes (m. 1980; div. 2013)
- Children: 10
- Relatives: Zach Wilson (nephew); Hannah Neeleman (daughter-in-law)
- Website: LinkedIn Page

David Gary Neeleman (born October 16, 1959) is a Brazilian-American businessman and entrepreneur. He has founded five commercial airlines: Morris Air, WestJet, JetBlue Airways, Azul Brazilian Airlines, and Breeze Airways. Along with Humberto Pedrosa and Aigle Azur, he owned 45% of TAP Air Portugal. In 2017 he became a citizen of Cyprus.

== Biography ==
Neeleman was born in São Paulo, Brazil, and raised in Sandy, Utah. He lived in Brazil until he was five.

His grandfather John Neeleman was born in Utah to Dutch immigrants and owned nine convenience stores.

== Career ==
He co-founded (with June Morris) Morris Air, a low-fare charter airline, and from 1984 to 1988, he was the executive vice president of the company.

In 1988, Neeleman assumed the helm of Morris Air as its president. In 1993, when Morris Air was acquired by Southwest Airlines for $130 million (Neeleman received $25 million from the sale), he worked for five months on its Executive Planning Committee.

After leaving Southwest, Neeleman became the CEO of Open Skies, a touch screen reservation and check-in systems company, later acquired by Hewlett-Packard in 1999. At the same time, he helped to found two new airlines, WestJet and NewAir, which later became JetBlue.

As the CEO of JetBlue Airways, his 2002 salary was $200,000 with a bonus of $90,000. Neeleman donated his entire salary to the JetBlue Crewmember Crisis Fund, which was established for JetBlue employees who had fallen on hard times.

On May 10, 2007, Neeleman was replaced by David Barger as CEO of JetBlue and, on May 21, 2008, he was replaced as chairman of the board by Joel Peterson.

On March 27, 2008, Neeleman officially announced plans to launch a new airline, Azul (Portuguese for "blue"), a domestic carrier in Brazil. Azul completed 2013 with over 5 Billion (BRL) in sales and is currently Brazil's largest airline.

On October 30, 2013, Neeleman and his youngest brother, Mark James Neeleman, a co-founder of Azul, announced the launch of a new company, Vigzul, a home security and monitoring company. Vigzul came from an idea of Mark Neeleman and was founded by David Allred, Brett Chambers and Neeleman serves as chairman of the board and principal investor.

In June 2015, the Portuguese Government decided to sell the TAP Air Portugal Group, owner of the national air carrier, TAP Air Portugal, to Atlantic Gateway, a joint venture between Neeleman and Portuguese entrepreneur Humberto Pedrosa; Atlantic Gateway took control of 61% of the capital of the Portuguese carrier, and promised to maintain Portugal as the airline's main hub for a minimum of 30 years. In July 2020 the Portuguese state increased its stake to 72.5 %. It acquired this stake from Atlantic Gateway, which now holds 22.5%.

In June 2022, Neeleman joined the board of Azorra, an aircraft lessor.

=== New US startup ===
In June 2018, he announced plans for a new US airline called Breeze Airways for which he raised $100m capital. On July 17, 2018, Breeze Airways signed a memorandum of understanding with Airbus for 60 A220-300 aircraft to be delivered beginning in 2021.

=== COVID-19 controversy ===
Neeleman was a critic of COVID-19 lockdowns. In 2020, he funded a study by John Ioannidis to estimate the prevalence of SARS-CoV-2 in Santa Clara County, California. Ioannidis, a physician and Stanford University professor, was also a prominent opponent of lockdowns during the COVID-19 pandemic. Ioannidis did not initially disclose his funding from Neeleman, thus creating a potential conflict of interest in his research findings if the researcher experienced pressure to align his findings with his funder's beliefs.

== Personal life ==
Neeleman, a member of the Church of Jesus Christ of Latter-day Saints, served a two-year mission in Brazil when he was 19. He has been diagnosed with ADHD. He is the father of 10 children with his former wife, Vicki Vranes. The couple has since divorced.

His brother, Stephen Neeleman, a general and trauma surgeon, was one of the founders of the American health care company HealthEquity. His nephew by his sister, Lisa, is New Orleans Saints quarterback Zach Wilson. His son, Daniel Neeleman, and daughter-in-law, Hannah Neeleman, run the social media account Ballerina Farm.

Neeleman was the 2005 recipient of the Tony Jannus Award for his contributions in the commercial aviation industry. He speaks fluent Portuguese and holds citizenships of Brazil, U.S. and Cyprus.
