= Michael Voris =

Catholic author and apologist

- Education: University of Notre Dame (B.A.); Pontifical University of Saint Thomas Aquinas (STB)
- Occupations: Journalist; author

Gary Michael Voris is an American Catholic author, speaker and apologist. Voris was the founder and president of St. Michael's Media, an outlet to produce catechetical and news videos and articles on the website Church Militant. In November 2023, Voris was asked to resign as president by the board of directors, due to Voris "breaching the Church Militant morality clause", behavior later reported as having sent unsolicited shirtless selfies to male staffers. Voris confirmed his resignation on his personal X account.

== Education and early career ==
Voris attended the University of Notre Dame, and graduated in 1983 with a degree in communications with a focus on history and politics. Between 1983 and 1986 he was a television anchor, producer and reporter for various CBS affiliates in New York, Albany, Duluth and Cheyenne, Wyoming. In 1989 he became a news reporter and producer for a Fox affiliate in Detroit, where he won four Regional Emmy Awards for production between 1992 and 1996.

In 1997 he began operation of an independent television production company called Concept Communications, LLC. This company was registered by co-owners Gary Michael Voris and John Fitzpatrick Mola with the State of Michigan on July 8, 1997.

Voris has confessed that "for most of my years in my thirties, confused about my own sexuality, I lived a life of live-in relationships with homosexual men. From the outside, I lived the lifestyle and contributed to scandal in addition to the sexual sins. On the inside, I was deeply conflicted about all of it. In a large portion of my twenties, I also had frequent sexual liaisons with both adult men and adult women. These are the sins of my past life in this area which are all now publicly admitted and owned by me. That was before my reversion to the Faith. Since my reversion, I abhor all these sins".

Voris cites the death of his brother from a heart attack in 2003, followed by his mother dying from stomach cancer in 2004, as the events that moved him from being "a lukewarm Catholic, someone who usually just went through the motions at church" to an "aggressive global advocate for conservative Catholics… on a burning mission to save Catholicism and America by trying to warn the public about what is a decline of morality in society."

Voris was reported to work "up to 18 hours a day, seven days a week" on creating presentations for St. Michael's Media.

In 2009, Voris received an STB degree from the Angelicum in Rome via Sacred Heart Major Seminary, graduating magna cum laude.

== St. Michael's Media ==
After being a guest speaker at several Catholic parishes in Detroit and serving as a host on the Michigan Catholic Radio network, in 2006 Voris started the digital television studio St. Michael's Media in Ferndale, Michigan.

In 2011 the Archdiocese of Detroit, citing canon 216 of the 1983 Code of Canon Law, published notice to Voris and RealCatholicTV that "it [did] not regard them as being authorized to use the word 'Catholic' to identify or promote their public activities." In 2012 the company name RealCatholicTV.com was changed to "ChurchMilitant.tv", which later became ChurchMilitant.com.

In 2011 the Catholic News Agency reported that St. Michael's Media was accepting donations, despite not being having been registered as a nonprofit since 2009.

Church Militant rejected the archdiocese's claims of disobedience and published an article detailing the apostolate's relationship with the archdiocese and the origins of the notice. "To this day, the archdiocese of Detroit has never specified any programming or content produced by St. Michael’s Media that it has found heterodox or problematic. It has issued no censure or delict against this apostolate, which remains in good standing in the Church," the article states.

Some critics of Voris within the Catholic Church ("from Pennsylvania to Spain to Detroit") have said that "his remarks, at times, promote division and extremism." Other critics of Voris have said he uses rumors or suggestions of a kind of guilt by association to slander priests and bishops. In 2023, the Church Militant website displayed criticism of US bishops, without specific names, calling them Marxists and anti-American.

The Southern Poverty Law Center (SPLC) included Church Militant/St. Michael's Media in its 2021 list of anti-LGBTQ hate groups. The website has been classified as a hate group by the SPLC since 2018.

In November 2023, Voris was asked to resign as president of Church Militant/St. Michael's Media by the board of directors, with the explanation that Voris had been "...breaching the Church Militant morality clause." Voris confirmed his resignation in a video posted to his personal X.com account. Two months later, The Washington Post reported that his violations consisted of sending unsolicited shirtless selfies, taken while he was working out, to male staffers.

=== Scranton ban ===
Voris has questioned the validity of Rabbinical Judaism, and such comments were later cited when he attempted to give a presentation in the Diocese of Scranton, Pennsylvania. In April 2011, Voris, who had intended to give a talk entitled "Living Catholicism Radically", was banned from speaking at Marywood University or any facilities owned by the diocese. This action was taken after complaints were made about Voris's statements. In a letter to the talk's organizers, Paul and Kristen Ciaccia, the diocese declared that it had "learned from" the United States Conference of Catholic Bishops (USCCB) and Voris's home Archdiocese of Detroit that Voris's presentations had caused "'a number of controversies' and that his programs are not endorsed by his home archdiocese."

Using a press release issued by the Archdiocese of Detroit, the Catholic Diocese of Scranton issued a statement in response to a planned speaking engagement of Voris in that diocese, saying that, "Although the Diocese shares Mr. Voris’ support of efforts to protect human life, his extreme positions on other faiths are not appropriate and therefore the Diocese cannot host him."

Voris ascribed this decision to "political correctness. Anything somebody takes offense at, whether it's true or not, seems to be out of bounds." The speech was moved to the Best Western Genetti Hotel and Conference Center in Wilkes-Barre, and the talk's organizers invited local bishop Joseph Bambera to attend "to evaluate Mr. Voris' knowledge of the faith, free from opinions formed by others." The bishop did not attend. The Ciaccias said the ban "belies deeper inconsistencies in diocesan policy." Voris spoke about the events in a video segment, noting the diocese allowed Sara Bendoraitis, the director of the Gay, Lesbian, Bisexual, Transgender and Ally Resource Center at American University, to speak at the University of Scranton the previous spring.
