= Franciscan Media =

American Catholic media company

- Founded: 1970
- Country of origin: United States
- Headquarters location: Cincinnati, Ohio
- Publication types: Books, magazines, websites
- Nonfiction topics: Catholicism
- Owners: Order of Friars Minor, St. John the Baptist Province
- Official website: www.franciscanmedia.org

Franciscan Media, formerly St. Anthony Messenger Press, is a multimedia company comprising St. Anthony Messenger magazine, Franciscan Media and Servant books, Catholic Greetings, Saint of the Day, Minute Meditations, and AmericanCatholic.org, used by millions of people, primarily in the United States, but also worldwide.

Located in Cincinnati, Ohio, Franciscan Media is a not-for-profit limited liability corporation (LLC) owned, financed, and operated by the Franciscan Friars of St. John the Baptist, a province of the worldwide Order of Friars Minor. Father Dan Kroger, OFM, is the CEO of Franciscan Media.

The Franciscans came to Cincinnati in 1844 from Tyrol (Austria) to minister to German-speaking immigrants. In 1876, the friars began publishing the German-language monthly Der Sendbote (German-American Messenger of the Sacred Heart). In 1892, the Franciscans introduced a new German-language St. Franciscus Bote.

In June 1893 the Franciscans of St. John the Baptist Province published the first copy of St. Anthony Messenger, for inspirational reading. It has continued uninterrupted publication since that time. It reached as many as 450,000 subscribers in the 1980s; today, at about 100,000 subscribers, it depends upon Internet and social media for its broad reach. The magazine has earned professional recognition for its design and editorial excellence.

In 1970, St. Anthony Messenger expanded its mission by launching St. Anthony Messenger Press to publish books, then audio and video publications. Those developed into today's line of digital products. An immensely popular parish handout product, Catholic Update, used by parishes across the United States for over 40 years, was sold in 2014. There were other handouts and parish products along the way.

In 2011, St. Anthony Messenger Press changed its name to Franciscan Media to better reflect the breadth of its mission. The company is a member of the Association of Catholic Publishers.

The mission of Franciscan Media is to "share God's love through thoughtful communications in the spirit of St. Francis."
