= The Catholic Telegraph =

American religious magazine in Ohio

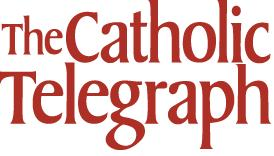

- June 2020 cover
- Editor: Jessica Rinaudo
- Director of digital engagement: Dominick Albano
- New media editor: Gregory Hartman
- Categories: Catholic
- Frequency: Monthly
- Format: Letter
- Publisher: Most Rev. Dennis Marion Schnurr
- Total circulation: 145,000 (2020)
- First issue: October 22, 1831; 194 years ago
- Company: Roman Catholic Archdiocese of Cincinnati
- Country: United States
- Based in: Cincinnati, Ohio
- Language: English
- Website: thecatholictelegraph.com
- ISSN: 1073-6689

The Catholic Telegraph is a monthly magazine published by the Roman Catholic Archdiocese of Cincinnati primarily for its 500,000 congregants. The archdiocese covers 19 counties in Ohio, including the Cincinnati and Dayton metropolitan areas. Originally a weekly newspaper, the Telegraph has published continuously since 1831, except for a brief period in 1832, making it the first diocesan newspaper and second oldest Catholic newspaper in the United States. The Telegraph became a monthly newspaper in September 2011 and began publishing in magazine format in June 2020.

== History ==
The Catholic Telegraph was established on October 22, 1831, by Bishop Edward Fenwick, O.P., the Archdiocese's first bishop. Its first editor put the paper on a short hiatus the next fall to care for victims of a cholera outbreak. The paper's use of the word "telegraph" predated the invention of the communication device by over a decade. As one of the first Catholic newspapers in the nation, the Telegraph was sold in cities throughout the country's middle section, including Louisville, Kentucky, Baltimore, Maryland, Washington, D.C., St. Louis, Missouri, and Pittsburgh, Pennsylvania. From 1849 to 1861, The Catholic Telegraph and Advocate also served as the Diocese of Louisville's official newspaper.

Early in the episcopal reign of John Baptist Purcell, the Telegraph fell into significant financial difficulties. As its closure appeared imminent, large numbers of common Catholics formed the Roman Catholic Society for the Diffusion of Knowledge, with its primary purpose being the rescue of the Telegraph. Their goal being accomplished, the Society's success became famous throughout the American Catholic Church, and a similar organization, patterned after the one in Cincinnati, was established in the Archdiocese of Baltimore.

From 1837 to 1907, the Telegraph had a German-language sister publication, known as Der Wahrheitsfreund. It was the country's first Catholic periodical published in German.

During the Civil War, the Telegraph took a difficult position on the questions of slavery and union. Under Archbishop Purcell, who emphasized the "prudential motives" that made the abolition of slavery inadvisable, the Telegraph stridently opposed slavery, secession, and initially abolition. Its antislavery stance stood in stark contrast to other Catholic newspapers, particularly the New York Freeman's Journal. In an editorial, the Telegraph condemned the New Orleans Catholic newspaper, Le Propagateur Catholique, for running an advertisement about a mulatre who was available for rent or sale. The Telegraph opined that "It is not necessary to be an abolitionist... to condemn a practice so repugnant to Catholic feeling." In April 1861, the month the Civil War started, the paper continued to urge accommodation with the slave states so strongly that an abolitionist, Unionist bishop condemned its editorial stance as "aid of treason." However, in 1863, it became the first prominent Catholic newspaper to advocate emancipation.

In 1937, the Telegraph renamed itself The Catholic Telegraph Register and joined the Denver-based Register System of Newspapers, which would later become the National Catholic Register. In 1961, the Archdiocese of Cincinnati assumed control of the Telegraph.

The Telegraph switched from a broadsheet format to a tabloid format in the 2000s. It launched a new website and Twitter account in March 2009. The paper switched from weekly to monthly publication in September 2011. Beginning with its October 2013 issue, it "move[d] towards a less 'newsy' mode".

In June 2020, the Telegraph began publishing in magazine format, after 188 years publishing as a newspaper. Each issue is focused on a different theme.

== Online presence ==
The online logo of The Catholic Telegraph.

The magazine's website, TheCatholicTelegraph.com, publishes news daily and reaches roughly 30,000 readers per month.

The Catholic News Archive provides free, full-text access to 2,726 issues of the Telegraph and the Telegraph and Advocate from the first issue on October 22, 1831, to December 31, 1885. The archive was digitized by the Catholic Research Resources Alliance with funding from the State Library of Ohio and Hamilton County Genealogy Society. Issues through the 1874 are also available from the Public Library of Cincinnati and Hamilton County. As of 2018, the library is working to digitize the rest of the issues that have entered the public domain, through 1922.

== See also ==
- St. Anthony Messenger
- List of Catholic newspapers and magazines in the United States
