= The Valley Catholic =

Catholic magazine published in San Jose, California

- The inaugural issue of The Valley Catholic as a magazine in May 2021, celebrating the diocese's 40th anniversary.
- Editor: Liz Sullivan
- Frequency: Bimonthly
- Publisher: Most Rev. Oscar Cantú
- Founded: March 1981
- Company: Roman Catholic Diocese of San José in California
- Country: United States
- Based in: San Jose, California
- Language: English, Spanish, Vietnamese
- Website: thevalleycatholic.org
- ISSN: 8750-6238

The Valley Catholic is the official bimonthly magazine of the Roman Catholic Diocese of San José in California. Its motto is "The Magazine of the Diocese of San José" (Spanish: La revista de la Diócesis de San José; Vietnamese: Tạp chí của Giáo phận San José).

== Content ==
The trilingual publication features parallel text in English, Spanish, and Vietnamese, the three most commonly spoken languages in the diocese. In the print edition, half of the articles are printed in English and Spanish, while the other half are in English and Vietnamese. Each article includes a QR code to read the article online in a third language.

The diocese relies on native language speakers to translate text from English and ensure diverse representation in photographs. Special features commemorate culturally significant feast days and celebrations, such as Santo Niño, Tết, Simbang Gabi, and Our Lady of Guadalupe.

== History ==
Weeks after the Diocese of San José split from the Archdiocese of San Francisco, The Valley Catholic began publishing as a newspaper in March 1981. The San Francisco archdiocese's newspaper, The Monitor, folded in 1984 partly due to reduced readership in the South Bay. The Valley Catholic originally published 19 times a year, roughly biweekly. In 2021, after a 14-month hiatus due to the COVID-19 pandemic, it was relaunched as a magazine.

== See also ==
- List of Catholic newspapers and magazines in the United States
