= St. Thomas Aquinas High School (New Jersey) =

Catholic high school in Edison, New Jersey, United States

Location
- 1 Tingley Lane; Edison, (Middlesex County), New Jersey 08820; United States
- 40°34′41″N 74°22′35″W

Information
- Former names: Bishop George Ahr High School
- Type: Private, Coeducational
- Religious affiliation: Roman Catholic
- Established: 1969
- School district: Diocese of Metuchen
- NCES School ID: 00866669
- President: Kevin Sacco
- Principal: Harry Ziegler
- Faculty: 45 FTEs
- Grades: 9–12
- Enrollment: 575 (as of 2021-22)
- Student to teacher ratio: 12.75:1
- Colors: Scarlet and white
- Athletics conference: Greater Middlesex Conference (general); Big Central Football Conference (football)
- Team name: Trojans
- Accreditation: AdvancED
- Newspaper: Satoma
- Yearbook: Insight
- Tuition: $16,975 (2024-25)
- Website: www.stahs.net

St. Thomas Aquinas High School, formerly known as Bishop George Ahr High School, is a private four-year college preparatory and coeducational Roman Catholic high school for students from ninth through twelfth grades. It is located on a campus covering 34 acres (14 ha) in the northern section of Edison, in Middlesex County, in the U.S. state of New Jersey. The school operates under the auspices of the Roman Catholic Diocese of Metuchen.

The school has an enrollment of 570 students and 45 classroom teachers, for a student–teacher ratio of 12.75:1. Students attend the school from Middlesex, Union, Monmouth, and Somerset counties in Central New Jersey.

The administration and teaching faculty hold B.S. or B.A. degrees; a significant percentage have M.A. degrees; and some hold a Ph.D. degree. St. Thomas Aquinas High School is overseen by the New Jersey Department of Education and is accredited by AdvancED.

== History ==
The school opened in 1969 as St. Thomas Aquinas High School. For the first year, the building was occupied by St. Thomas Aquinas High School on the first floor and St. Pius High School on the second floor, as St. Pius was still under construction. Originally a part of the Diocese of Trenton, St. Thomas Aquinas High School joined the newly-formed Diocese of Metuchen in 1981.

The school was renamed Bishop George Ahr High School in 1983, in honor of George W. Ahr, Trenton's longest-serving bishop.

In fall 2006, a multi-million dollar addition opened, which featured a second gymnasium, two computer labs, a weight room, a new music room, and several classrooms and conference rooms.

On July 1, 2019, as part of several significant changes in honor of its 50th anniversary, the school reverted to its original name.

== Academics ==
=== Graduation requirements ===
Graduation from St. Thomas Aquinas High School requires a minimum of 130 credits. Subjects required for graduation are as follows:

Theology	4 years
English	4 years
Mathematics	4 years
Physical Education & Health	4 years
Science	3 years
Social Studies	3 years
World Language	2 years (3 recommended)
Fine Arts	1 year
Computer Science	1 year
Financial Literacy	1 semester (senior year)
Career & College Education	2 quarters (sophomore and junior years)

=== Course levels ===
St. Thomas Aquinas High School offers courses at the College Prep, Accelerated, Honors, and Advanced Placement levels.

Advanced Placement courses are offered in AP 2D Art & Design, AP Art History, AP Biology, AP Chemistry, AP Computer Science, AP English Language and Composition, AP English Literature and Composition, AP United States History, AP Calculus, AP Statistics, AP Physics B, AP Psychology, and AP Statistics.

== Athletics ==
The St. Thomas Aquinas High School Trojans compete in the Greater Middlesex Conference, which is comprised of public and private high schools in the Middlesex County area and operates under the supervision of the New Jersey State Interscholastic Athletic Association. Sports offered for men include: baseball, basketball, bowling, cross country, football, golf, lacrosse, soccer, swimming, tennis, wrestling, and winter and spring track. Women's sports include: basketball, bowling, cheerleading, cross country, golf, gymnastics, lacrosse, soccer, softball, swimming, tennis, volleyball, and winter and spring track. With 510 students in grades 10–12, the school was classified by the NJSIAA for the 2019–20 school year as Non-Public A for most athletic competition purposes, which included schools with an enrollment of 381 to 1,454 students in that grade range (equivalent to Group II for public schools). The football team competes in Division 2B of the Big Central Football Conference, which includes 60 public and private high schools in Hunterdon, Middlesex, Somerset, Union and Warren counties, which are broken down into 10 divisions by size and location. The school was classified by the NJSIAA as Non-Public Group B (equivalent to Group I/II for public schools) for football for 2024–2026, which included schools with 140 to 686 students.

The football team won the Non-Public A South state sectional championship in 1984, 1985 and 1986. The 1984 team won the Parochial A South state sectional title with a 17–0 victory against Holy Cross Academy in the championship game. The 1985 team finished the season with a 9–2 record after defeating Holy Spirit High School by a score of 10-6 by scoring a fourth-quarter touchdown in the Parochial A South championship game. The team was champion of the Middlesex County Blue Division in 2005, 2007, 2008, and 2009.

The girls' gymnastics team has won the team state championship in 1992, 1994, 1995, 2003–2007, 2010 and 2013; the 10 titles are the second-most of any school in the state.

The boys bowling team won the overall state championship in 1995.

The girls swimming team won the state Non-Public A South sectional championship in 1996, 1997 and 1998. The school's swimming team won the Greater Middlesex Conference in 2005, 2006, 2007 and 2011.

The baseball team won the 2006 Non-Public South A sectional championship over St. Augustine, 16–15.

The wrestling team won the Parochial B South state sectional title in 2007 and the PArochial A South title in 2011. The team won the 2007 Non-Public South B sectional championship with a 46–27 win over Holy Cross.

The softball team took the 2009 Non-Public South A sectional title, shutting out both Holy Spirit High School and Camden Catholic High School, and won the tournament final over Gloucester Catholic High School to win the team's first sectional title for nine years.

The girls soccer team won the Non-Public A state championship in 2013 with a 1–0 win in the tournament final against Immaculate Heart Academy, which came into the game ranked fourth in the state by The Star-Ledger.

The varsity cheerleading team won the National Championship and best overall Grand Champion in Myrtle Beach, S.C. on March 11, 2017.

== Performing arts ==
The St. Thomas Aquinas Drama Department oversees production of at least three full-length performances each school year with opportunities throughout the year both onstage and offstage.

Fall opportunities include the “Shakespeare and the Classics” program which begins rehearsals In late summer to produce a play in mid-September. Then, in November, the department puts on another full-length play or musical. Recent Fall Productions include "Into the Woods," "Noises Off!" and "Little Shop of Horrors."

In the spring, the department presents a large-scale musical. Recent performances include "Something Rotten," "The SpongeBob Musical," and "Legally Blonde: The Musical."

The Music Department includes a Marching Band with Color Guard (the Marching Trojans), a symphonic band (the Concert Band), a mixed chorus (the Concert Choir) an a cappella group (the Director’s Select Chorus), a Liturgical band, and a jazz ensemble (the Jazz Band).

== Notable alumni ==
- Ralph Citarella (born 1958), former Major League Baseball pitcher who played for the St. Louis Cardinals and Chicago White Sox
- Joe Gallo (born 1980), college basketball head coach for the Merrimack Warriors men's basketball team
- Ed Kalegi (born 1967), actor / radio personality / host / voice actor
- John McCormac (class of 1976), Mayor of Woodbridge Township, New Jersey
- Patrick Morrisey (born 1967), Governor of West Virginia
- Kevin Mulvey (born 1985), former MLB pitcher who played for the Minnesota Twins and Arizona Diamondbacks
- Matt Popino (born c. 1991), college football coach, who has been the head football coach for Carthage College since 2024
- Preslaysa Williams (born 1979), actress, journalist and author
- Darrin Winston (1966–2008), Major League Baseball player who played two seasons for the Philadelphia Phillies
