= Robert Hoyt (journalist) =

American journalist

Robert G. Hoyt (1922 – April 10, 2003) was an American journalist, and the founder in 1964 and first editor of the National Catholic Reporter, an independent weekly newspaper focusing on the Catholic Church.

== Biography ==
=== Career ===
In 1964, Hoyt founded the National Catholic Reporter because he wanted to bring the professional standards of secular news reporting to the Catholic press. In the first two years, he conducted extensive reporting about the Second Vatican Council, a major reform effort in the Catholic Church that resulted in significant changes in practices and doctrines. The paper also published secret reports from the commission studying the church's position on birth control, which was a major scoop. Although the commission recommended that the church revise its condemnation of contraception, the pope disagreed and refused.

Hoyt was credited with attracting a number of talented columnists, such as John Leo, Garry Wills, Rabbi Arthur Hertzberg, and Martin Marty. The paper's circulation climbed rapidly from 11,000 to 100,000 in a few years. Hoyt influenced the way the Catholic Church was understood in the United States and how the media reported on it. Other Catholic newspapers began to adopt the Reporter's high standards of journalism.

=== Leaving NCR ===
After becoming increasingly involved in Democratic Party politics, Hoyt left the newspaper in 1970. He opposed the Vietnam War, and worked on the presidential campaigns of both US senators Eugene McCarthy (D-MN) in 1968 and George McGovern (D-SD) in 1972.

Hoyt returned to journalism and writing about religion and society. From 1977 to 1985, he was executive editor and subsequently editor-in-chief of Christianity & Crisis, a liberal ecumenical journal. He was also senior writer at Commonweal.

=== Death ===
Hoyt died in Manhattan, New York City on April 10, 2003.

== Personal life ==
Hoyt married Bernadette Lyon in 1948 and they had six children together. They divorced in 1970. He later married Mig Boyle and they had a daughter together.
