= Business capability model =

Structured map of business capabilities

A business capability model or business capability map (BCM) provides structured graphical representations of all organizational business capabilities, their relationship and hierarchy.

== Overview ==
Business capability models represent high-level views of an organization from the perspective of its business capabilities. Essentially, they briefly describe everything that an organization can do. Business capability models are very stable and organizationally neutral in nature. They are largely independent of specific organizational structures, reporting relationships, political agendas and cultural aspects of individual business leaders, current initiatives and projects. Furthermore, most changes happening in organizations do not affect the fundamental structure of their business capability models.

== Contents ==
Business capability models are structured in a hierarchical manner, i.e. each higher-level business capability includes multiple constituting lower-level capabilities. They can have several nested levels of depth and granularity, typically from two to four distinct abstraction levels depending on the size, complexity and experience of an organization. At the highest level, often considered as level zero, all business capabilities can be separated into customer-facing (front office) capabilities and operational (back office) capabilities. Top-level business capabilities can be also organized according to main organizational functions, e.g. enable, manage and run, or aligned to core activities of the value chain, e.g. logistics, operations, sales and service. Underlying lower-level business capabilities are naturally more numerous and fine-grained. Specific business capabilities in business capability models can be titled using either a noun-verb style or a verb-noun style, e.g. "product development" or "develop products".

In their simplest form business capability models can show only structured sets of nested business capabilities and sub-capabilities. However, more sophisticated versions of these EA artifacts can also provide additional information regarding an organization and its environment relevant for strategic decision-making. Complex business capability models often include an organizational mission, strategy and vision, document its long-term goals, objectives and constraints and even show the most important elements of its external business environment that should be taken into account during strategic planning, e.g. key competitors, strategic partners, major suppliers, target markets, core customer groups, industry regulators or some other critical elements of the organizational context.

== Development ==
Since business capability models offer only a very high-level view of an organization, usually they can be created rather quickly. Perfect accurateness and correctness are not among their most important or critical qualities. Moreover, more intuitive and simple business capability models are more likely to resonate with the thought processes of business executives. In many industries the development of business capability models can be accelerated via taking openly available industry-standard reference models or even proprietary generic reference models provided by commercial vendors as the basis for producing customized, organization-specific capability models. In some cases, separate parts of business capability models representing common groups of the most typical capabilities, e.g. customer management or product management, can be borrowed from other industries and adapted to the organizational needs.

== Usage ==
Business capability models are often used for strategic planning up to 3-5 years ahead in the future. Business executives and architects usually discuss the relative importance of different business capabilities from the strategic perspective, identify the capabilities requiring the most significant enhancements in the long run and then employ the so-called technique of heatmapping, i.e. explicitly highlighting or color-coding the business capabilities that should become the primary focus of future IT investments. Often the necessary strategic capability improvements can be also classified into different types reflecting the nature of these improvements, e.g. fundamentally new business operations should be added to the capability, the quality of current operations should be raised or the existing capability should be performed at lower cost, and then color-coded appropriately in business capability models. In some cases completely new business capabilities that need to be developed from scratch may be added to business capability models and heatmapped accordingly, while some existing capabilities that lost their importance may be removed as irrelevant.

The set of heatmapped business capabilities in business capability models represents a consensus understanding of the organizational focus and strategic priorities agreed by business and IT. In their turn, these business capabilities provide a sound basis for further, more detailed IT planning. Using heatmapped business capabilities as a starting point for IT planning, architects and business leaders can propose candidate IT initiatives intended to uplift these capabilities and thereby directly contribute to the execution of a business strategy. By means of heatmapping, business capability models offer very effective instruments for translating an abstract business strategy into more specific and actionable plans for IT. Essentially, they help view an entire organization as an investment portfolio with different types of assets, proactively focus IT investments on the assets with highest returns and achieve the greatest possible strategic impact. However, not all enhancements of business capabilities can be relevant to IT, especially the ones related to people aspects.

Besides highlighting the most critical target capabilities for future IT investments and indicating respective maturity levels and capability gaps, business capability models can be also color-coded in many other useful ways to facilitate strategic decision-making. For example, business capability models can be color-coded to distinguish core capabilities from non-core ones and thereby identify the opportunities for outsourcing. While core capabilities should be cultivated and mastered within an organization, non-core capabilities can be considered as good candidates for outsourcing with minimal business risk.

== See also ==
- Enterprise architecture
- Enterprise architecture artifacts
