= Hannah Neeleman =

American social media personality in Utah

- Born: Hannah Wright; June 25, 1990 (age 36); Springville, Utah, U.S.
- Education: Juilliard School
- Occupation: Social media influencer
- Spouse: Daniel Neeleman (m. 2011)
- Children: 9
- Relatives: David Neeleman (father-in-law); Zach Wilson (cousin-in-law)
- Beauty pageant titleholder
- Title: Mrs. American 2023; Mrs. Utah 2021; Miss New York City 2010; Miss Springville New York
- Hair color: Blonde
- Major competitions: Miss New York 2011; Mrs. Utah 2021 (won); Mrs. America 2022

TikTok information
- Page: ballerinafarm
- Followers: 10.6 million
- Last updated: November 6, 2025
- Website: ballerinafarm.com

Hannah Neeleman (née Wright; born June 25, 1990) is an American social media figure and businesswoman, known by her social media handle Ballerina Farm. Named for her farm in Kamas, Utah, Neeleman is known for posting about homemaking, farming, and raising her nine children.

== Early life ==
Neeleman grew up in a Mormon family of nine children in Springville, Utah. Her parents owned a flower shop. At the age of 14, she attended a Juilliard School summer ballet program. Two years later, she received a scholarship to Brigham Young University's theatre ballet program and finished her university ballet studies at Juilliard School in New York City.

== Pageants ==
Neeleman won the title of Miss New York City 2010 and competed in the Miss New York pageant while a Juilliard School ballet student. After getting married and having children, she competed in the Mrs. America competition and was crowned Mrs. Utah in 2021.

In 2023, she competed as Mrs. South Dakota and was crowned Mrs. American (which is a separate pageant from Mrs. America, though both are run by Elaine Marmel, who also heads the Mrs. World competition). She appeared on stage in Las Vegas less than two weeks after giving birth to her eighth child. Her answer to a question about female empowerment attracted attention from conservative media: "After I hold that newborn baby in my arms [...] the feeling of motherhood and bringing them to the earth is the most empowering feeling I have ever felt."

== Social media ==
As of 2024, Neeleman had 10 million Instagram followers and 9.8 million TikTok followers. She is considered a tradwife on social media, an aesthetic and lifestyle emblematic of mid-century housewives, though she does not personally identify with the label. She is frequently seen wearing vintage-style dresses and gingham aprons, earning her comparisons to Ma from Little House on the Prairie. Neeleman's home cooking videos are set in her kitchen. Her green AGA cooker, named Agnes, is a prominent feature of her kitchen.

The New York Times wrote that Ballerina Farm was "simultaneously one of the most popular social media stars in the country and a lightning rod for criticism." Neeleman has been criticized for romanticizing traditional gender roles, failing to publicly display the farm's hired employees, and not acknowledging the family's financial privilege. Viewers have speculated that the family is likely not living off the profits of the farm, and have pointed out that their home's stove, which Hannah says she purchased used, retails for about $20,000; their property was also listed for $2.75 million when they purchased it in 2018.

== Farm and business operations ==
Neeleman purchased her 328-acre farm in 2018 after returning to Utah after years abroad. While living in Brazil, the Neelemans discovered farm life after spending time in farm hotels. The farm's name, suggested by Neeleman's older brother, is inspired by her background as a professional ballerina. Neeleman considers herself the founder and chief executive of Ballerina Farm.

Neeleman raises cattle, chickens, sheep, pigs, and other livestock. Cattle and pigs are part of the farm's meat packing operations, where the packaged meat is sold on her online store. The Ballerina Farm store sells a range of other products including pre-packaged baked goods, beeswax candles, honey, sourdough starter, kitchen supplies, clothing, flowers grown in Ecuador, and more. Three full-time workers assist in the day-to-day operations of Ballerina farm, while thirty are employed at a warehouse and ten in an office. Neeleman said in 2024 that about 90% of products are exported out of Utah.

In a 2024 interview with The New York Times, Neeleman said that she intended to expand the Ballerina Farm brand. Ballerina Farm's annexation of land for a 14-acre (5.7 ha) agricultural tourism site on the main highway in Kamas was unanimously approved by the Kamas City Council on August 27, 2024. An opening date has not yet been announced. Plans include a Ballerina Farm store, where visitors will be able to purchase perishable farm goods and online bestsellers. The planned dairy building and creamery includes production of milk, ice cream and butter.

In January 2026, journalists reported that during late May and early June 2025, the farm's raw milk was measured as having a level of coliform bacteria that exceeded safety limits. In February 2026, Ballerina Farm published a statement that they stopped the sale of raw milk in August 2025 but claimed that, during the period in which they sold raw milk, they met Utah's raw milk health standards and that their milk was "100% safe". Utah's Department of Agriculture and Food requires that a business's permit to sell raw milk to be suspended if monthly tests fail to meet health standards three times in a period of five months.

== Personal life ==
Neeleman was first introduced to her husband Daniel through a mutual friend while attending Juilliard. (Note: On her website, Neeleman writes that she met Daniel during the summer break preceding her senior year at Juilliard.) Six months later, he used his connections to ensure he sat next to her on a JetBlue flight, and they began dating afterwards. They got engaged three weeks later. They were married in July 2011 at the Manti Utah Temple. Daniel is also a Latter-day Saint (Mormon), and grew up in a family of nine children. He is the son of David Neeleman, who founded five airlines, including JetBlue, and led efforts to take TAP Air Portugal private.

The couple spent several years living in Brazil for Daniel's job as director of home security company, Vigzul, which was founded by his father. Upon returning to the United States, Daniel attended business school at the University of Utah while serving on the board of a different security company. They spent three years looking for farmland and initially purchased a different farm in 2017 prior to purchasing Ballerina Farm in 2018.

Neeleman told The New York Times in 2024 that the family hires a personal assistant, a homeschool teacher for five of her school-aged children, and an occasional babysitter. Hannah and Daniel have a total of nine children, with three sons and six daughters. The couple were raised in Mormonism as members of the Church of Jesus Christ of Latter Day Saints, which they still adhere to.
