= VASP Flight 375 =

1988 attempted aircraft hijacking

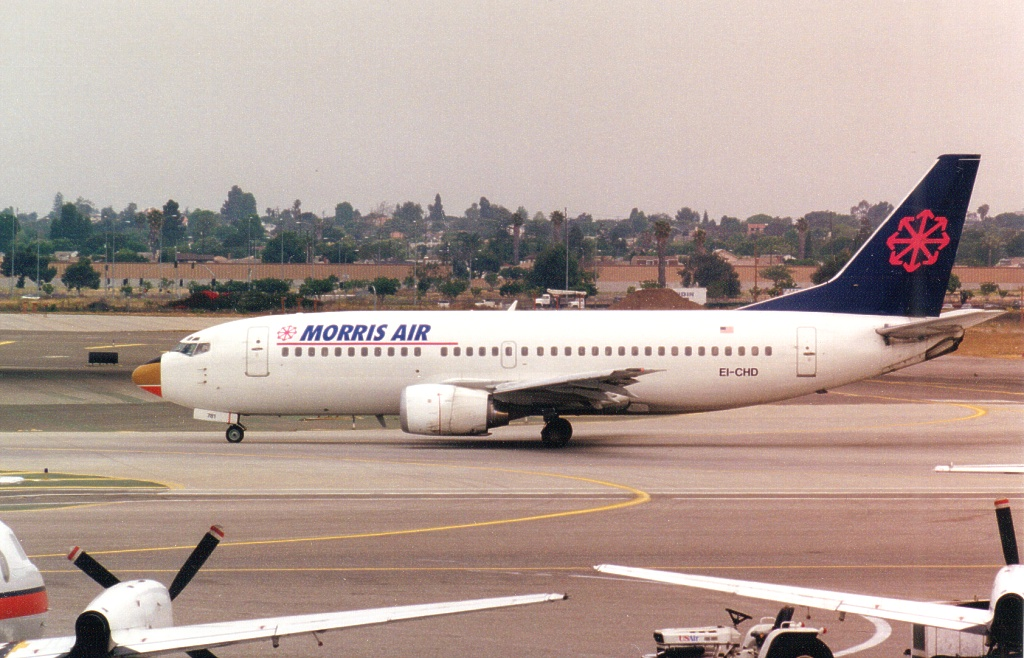
- The aircraft involved in the hijacking, seen now in service with Morris Air

Hijacking
- Date: September 29, 1988
- Summary: Hijacking
- Site: Initially over Minas Gerais, over Brasília; subsequently Santa Genoveva Airport, Goiânia

Aircraft
- Aircraft type: Boeing 737-317
- Operator: VASP
- IATA flight No.: VP375
- ICAO flight No.: VSP375
- Call sign: VASP 375
- Registration: PP-SNT
- Flight origin: Porto Velho International Airport, Porto Velho, Brazil
- 1st stopover: Brasília International Airport, Brasília, Brazil
- 2nd stopover: Santa Genoveva Airport, Goiânia, Brazil
- 3rd stopover: Tancredo Neves International Airport, Belo Horizonte, Brazil
- Destination: Rio de Janeiro/Galeão International Airport, Rio de Janeiro, Brazil
- Occupants: 105
- Passengers: 98
- Crew: 7
- Fatalities: 1
- Injuries: 3
- Survivors: 104

VASP Flight 375 was a hijacked flight on September 29, 1988, by Raimundo Nonato Alves da Conceição, who aimed to crash the plane with 98 passengers and 7 crew aboard against the Planalto Palace in Brasília. The flight, operated by a Boeing 737-300 aircraft, left Porto Velho to Rio de Janeiro, making stops in Brasília, Goiânia and Belo Horizonte. In the final phase of the flight, between Belo Horizonte and Rio de Janeiro, the plane was hijacked and diverted to Brasília. The hijacking was unsuccessful, and the aircraft landed safely in Goiânia. The only fatality as a result of the hijacking was the First Officer, Salvador Evangelista.

The pilot who averted the tragedy, Fernando Murilo de Lima e Silva, was honoured in October 2001 by the National Aeronaut Union and received the Aeronautical Highlight trophy for preventing the deaths of almost 100 passengers aboard the aircraft.

== Background ==
By the end of the 1980s, Brazil was facing a poor economic phase with high unemployment and inflation. Raimundo Nonato Alves da Conceição, who was from a poor family and had recently lost his job, decided to punish the person he thought responsible for the bad situation he and the country were going through: the then President of the Republic, José Sarney, launching an airplane against the Planalto Palace, where the Presidential Office is located.

Raimundo bought a 32-caliber revolver and boarded VASP flight 375. At the time, X-ray machines and metal detectors were not used to check baggage at Confins Airport, which allowed free passage of the passenger.

== Aircraft ==
The aircraft was a Boeing 737-317 (manufacturer's serial number 23176, Boeing line number 1213, registration PP-SNT). It had its first flight on March 18, 1986, and was delivered to Canadian airline CP Air on April 2, 1986. Subsequently, it was delivered to VASP, Morris Air, and ultimately ended up in the fleet of U.S. carrier Southwest Airlines. Southwest stopped service of the aircraft under the registration N698SW in 2013, and it was scrapped in Greenwood-Leflore Airport.

== Hijacking ==
The flight, which came from Porto Velho and stopped at Belo Horizonte, took off at 10:42 am and about 20 minutes after takeoff, with the plane already in the air space of Rio de Janeiro, Raimundo Nonato announced the hijacking: he said he wanted to enter the cockpit, and he shot Ronaldo Dias, a flight attendant, when he tried to stop him. He fired several times at the cockpit door, broke it open, and went inside. Upon entering, Raimundo shot the extra crew member, Gilberto Renhe, who had his leg fractured by the shot.

Without the hijacker noticing, pilot Fernando Murilo de Lima e Silva called for the transponder code 7500, which in the language of aeronautics indicates illegal interference (hijacking). While attempting to answer the radio response from CINDACTA (Brazilian air traffic control), First Officer Salvador Evangelista was shot by the hijacker and died instantly. Raimundo then pointed the revolver at the captain and demanded that the aircraft be diverted immediately to Brasília. Raimundo eventually gave up on crashing the plane into the Planalto Palace but prevented the pilot from landing the plane with almost no fuel at Brasília International Airport or at Anápolis Air Force Base. When he approached Goiânia, the pilot made two acrobatic maneuvers (a "tonneau" and a spin) that were witnessed by a Mirage III fighter. It was successful in the second maneuver, which allowed a quick landing at Santa Genoveva Airport at 1:45 pm.

On land, the hijacking and negotiations continued for several hours. The hijacker even demanded a smaller plane to flee, but around 7:00 pm, when he was descending the flight ladder using the pilot as a shield, he was shot three times by the elite Brazil Federal Police team. He died two days later, a victim of sickle-cell disease, unrelated to the shots, according to the coroner Fortunato Badan Palhares.

== See also ==
- Lufthansa Flight 181 - an aircraft hijacking in 1977
- United Airlines Flight 93 - another hijacking that was possibly attempting to crash into the presidential residence
