= St. Anthony Messenger =

Catholic magazine

- Cover of the March 2013 issue
- Executive Editors: Christopher Heffron and Susan Hines-Brigger
- Franciscan editors: Pat McCloskey, OFM and John Barker, OFM
- Managing Editor: Daniel Imwalle
- Categories: Catholic magazine
- Frequency: Monthly
- First issue: June 1, 1893
- Final issue: 2025
- Company: Franciscan Media
- Country: United States
- Based in: Cincinnati, Ohio
- Language: English
- Website: www.stanthonymessenger.org
- ISSN: 0036-276X

St. Anthony Messenger was a national Roman Catholic family magazine published by the Franciscan Friars (O.F.M.) of St. John the Baptist Province, Cincinnati, Ohio in the United States, with the explicit ecclesiastical approval of the Archbishop of Cincinnati.

== History ==
The first issue of the magazine was published by the Franciscans on June 1, 1893. Over the decades it grew into one of the principal Catholic family magazines in the United States.

In recent decades, in the wake of the Second Vatican Council, the magazine expanded into Franciscan Media, which has become one of the country's largest publishers of popular, inspirational, and educational Roman Catholic spirituality resources.

The magazine has featured interviews with and articles about prominent Catholics, and includes educational, inspirational, and informative articles and columns each month.

Two of its longest-lived and popular regular features are Pete and Repeat and Ask a Franciscan.

In December 2025, Franciscan Media announced they would be closing at the end of 2025. The November/December 2025 edition was the final issue of St. Anthony Messenger. Per the letter, the decision to discontinue publication of St. Anthony Messenger was made after much prayer, discernment, and heartfelt conversation. The decision to conclude operations was made in response to shifting financial, technological, and cultural realities.

== See also ==
- The Catholic Telegraph
