= Catholic Courier =

American Catholic newspaper

- Type: Monthly newspaper
- Owner: Roman Catholic Diocese of Rochester
- Founded: 1889; 136 years ago
- Language: English
- City: Rochester, New York
- Country: United States
- OCLC number: 8483383
- Website: catholiccourier.com
- Free online archives: nyshistoricnewspapers.org

The Catholic Courier is the newspaper of the Roman Catholic Diocese of Rochester, New York.

== History ==
The journal was first published as The Catholic Journal in October 1889. It has had several names combining the words Catholic, Courier, and Journal over nearly 130 years. In 2004 the paper started putting all content online. In 2013 the paper completed a digital archive of all issues back to 1889.

== Current form ==
The Courier is currently published ten times per year (January–June and August–December) as a printed newspaper, reaching nearly 100,000 homes in the 12-county Diocese of Rochester, New York. An interactive digital replica of the print format is available 12 months of the year, and news is updated daily. The newspaper also offers free weekly e-newsletters.
