= National Catholic Reporter =

American newspaper covering Catholic issues

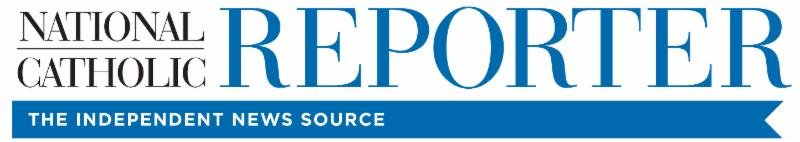
- Type: Biweekly
- Format: Non-profit newspaper
- Owner: The National Catholic Reporter Publishing Company
- Founder: Robert Hoyt
- Publisher: Joe Ferullo
- Editor-in-chief: Michael J. O'Loughlin
- Founded: 1964; 62 years ago
- Language: English
- Headquarters: Kansas City, Missouri
- Circulation: 35,000 (as of 2013)
- ISSN: 0027-8939
- Website: ncronline.org

The National Catholic Reporter (NCR) is a national newspaper in the United States that reports on issues related to the Catholic Church. Based in Kansas City, Missouri, NCR was founded by Robert Hoyt in 1964. Hoyt wanted to bring the professional standards of secular news reporting to the press that covers Catholic news, saying that "if the mayor of a city owned its only newspaper, its citizens will not learn what they need and deserve to know about its affairs". The publication, which operates outside the authority of the Catholic Church, is independently owned and governed by a lay board of directors.

== Overview ==
The paper is published bi-weekly, with each issue including national and world news sections, as well as an opinion and arts section. Each paper runs an average of 32 pages, which includes special sections, a section published in each issue devoted to a particular topic.

Each issue includes news stories, analysis, commentary, opinion and editorials. The Opinion and Arts section contains book and film reviews, as well as spiritual reflections, along with letters to the editor, classifieds and editorials.

The organization reported $4.3 million in annual revenue in 2013. The Conrad N. Hilton Foundation is a major financial supporter of the newspaper. The Global Sisters Report is a project of NCR.

== Editorial stance ==
NCR presents itself "as one of the few, if not the only truly independent, journalistic outlet for Catholics and others who struggle with the complex moral and societal issues of the day." Russell Shaw, writing in the supplemental volume of the Encyclopedia of Catholic Social Thought, Social Science, and Social Policy writes that NCR "has been criticized for ideological bias and a tilt in favor of progressive Catholicism and dissent, not only in its editorial and opinion pages but in its news coverage as well, together with an excessive readiness to dispute and oppose statements and actions of the Holy See and the bishops". For example, NCR has asserted that climate change is the "No. 1 pro-life issue" facing the Catholic Church today.

According to Thomas Tweed, director of the Ansari Institute of Global Engagement with Religion at the University of Notre Dame, "I think the same thing that has happened in American political life and media has happened to some extent to Catholics. Progressive Catholics read Commonweal and the National Catholic Reporter, and traditionalist Catholics watch EWTN and read newsletters from the Blue Army."

== Criticism ==
In April 1967, NCR published confidential reports of a commission appointed by Pope Paul VI to review the church's teaching on artificial contraception. The majority of the commission recommended revisions to the teaching. The action was among the reasons Bishop Charles H. Helmsing of Kansas City, Missouri, in 1968, issued a condemnation of NCR and demanded that it remove the word Catholic from its name. Bishop Helmsing issued a statement condemning NCR, saying it had a "policy of crusading against the Church's teachings", a "poisonous character" and "disregard and denial of the most sacred values of our Catholic faith." Because the publication "does not reflect the teaching of the Church, but on the contrary, has openly and deliberately opposed this teaching", he asked the editors to "drop the term 'Catholic' from their masthead" because "they deceive their Catholic readers and do a great disservice to ecumenism by [...] watering down Catholic teachings."

NCR did not comply with his request. Dozens of Catholic journalists would sign a statement disagreeing with the condemnation, citing its "underlying definition of the legitimate boundaries of religious journalism in service to the church." The Catholic Press Association reported that the dispute arose from a difference of opinion regarding the function of the press.

In 2013, Bishop Robert Finn of Kansas City, Missouri, wrote a column in his diocesan newspaper discussing Helmsing's condemnation of NCR. He stated, "From my perspective, NCR's positions against authentic Church teaching and leadership have not changed trajectory in the intervening decades." Finn wrote that the paper had refused to "submit their bona fides as a Catholic media outlet in accord with the expectations of Church law", and considered itself an "independent newspaper which commented on 'things Catholic'."

NCR publisher Thomas C. Fox denied the implication that there was a decades-long animosity between the diocese and the newspaper, noting that Bishop John Sullivan and Bishop Raymond Boland "had cordial relations with NCR". He pointed out that NCR is a member of the Catholic Press Association of the United States and Canada, whose honorary president is Bishop John Charles Wester, who also serves as the chairman of the Committee of Communications of the United States Conference of Catholic Bishops. Fox noted an NCR editorial in November 2012 had called on Finn to resign or be removed from his position after Finn was found guilty "of failing to report suspected child abuse involving a local priest." Finn resigned from the Diocese of Kansas City on April 21, 2015, after an internal Vatican investigation.

== Awards ==
NCR has won the "General Excellence" award from the Catholic Press Association in the category of national news publications six times between 2008 and 2014.

The Catholic Press Association in June 2017 awarded former NCR editor and publisher Tom Fox its highest honor for publishers, the Bishop John England Award.

== See also ==
- Institute for Nonprofit News (member)
- List of Catholic newspapers and magazines in the United States
