= National Catholic Register =

Catholic newspaper in the United States

- Cover of National Catholic Register, February 26 - March 10, 2012 issue
- Type: Catholic
- Format: Print; Online
- Owner: EWTN
- Founder: Matthew J. Smith
- Publisher: Michael Warsaw
- Founded: November 8, 1927; 98 years ago
- Language: English
- Headquarters: Irondale, Alabama
- Circulation: 24,706 (as of 2013)
- ISSN: 0027-8920
- Website: ncregister.com

The National Catholic Register is a Catholic newspaper in the United States. It was founded on November 8, 1927, by Matthew J. Smith as the national edition of the Denver Catholic Register. The Register's current owner is the Eternal Word Television Network, Inc. of Irondale, Alabama, which also owns the Catholic News Agency.

Content includes news and features from the United States, the Vatican, and worldwide, on such topics as culture, education, books, arts, and entertainment, as well as interviews. Online content includes various blogs and breaking news.

The Register's print edition is published biweekly (26 times a year). Tom Wehner has been the managing editor since 2009. Jeanette DeMelo became editor in chief in 2012. She was succeeded by Shannon Mullen in January 2023.

== History ==
=== Diocesan ownership ===
The National Catholic Register was founded as the national edition of the Denver Catholic Register, the official weekly newspaper of the Diocese of Denver. The National Catholic Register began publication on November 8, 1927, with four pages of national and international news. Monsignor Matthew J. Smith was its first editor.

In June 1929, the Diocese of Monterey–Fresno asked to bundle local news with the National Catholic Register, and other dioceses followed suit. The arrangement turned into a chain known as the Register System of Newspapers. Dioceses across the United States could wrap their own diocesan newspapers around the national edition. In 1931, Msgr. Smith founded the Register School of Journalism at St. Thomas Seminary in Denver. The chain's circulation peaked in the 1950s, with the national edition and at least 34 diocesan editions reaching 850,000 households.

=== Twin Circle ownership ===
After Msgr. Smith's death in 1960, the chain entered a period of decline. By 1970, the chain had been dismantled, with each diocesan edition being transferred back to local diocesan management. On August 6, 1970, Patrick Frawley's Twin Circle Publishing Co. purchased the financially struggling National Catholic Register, changing its editorial focus from progressive to conservative. At the point of sale, the paper had a circulation of 112,000.

=== Legionary ownership ===
In 1995, Frawley sold the paper to Circle Media, a ministry of the Legion of Christ. During the church sex abuse scandals of the 2000s, the paper downplayed allegations of sexual abuse by Legionary founder Marcial Maciel, and defended him against the Congregation for the Doctrine of the Faith on its editorial pages. After new revelations in 2009, benefactors cut ties with the paper, leaving it in a precarious state. In 2010, the paper's publisher, Father Owen Kearns, issued an apology for its coverage of Maciel and his victims. He was replaced by Dan Burke, who moved the paper from weekly to biweekly publication and launched a new website.

=== EWTN ownership ===
In 2011, Eternal Word Television Network acquired the paper from the Legion of Christ.

In 2013, the Register had a print circulation of 24,706.

The 2017 Catholic Press Association awards named the Register Newspaper of the Year.

In 2021, the Register had an average print circulation of 43,117 based on its 2021 Statement of Ownership on file at the USPS.

== Former Register newspapers ==
- The Advance Register, Dioceses of Wichita and Dodge City (1940–?)
- The Alamo Register, Archdiocese of San Antonio (1942–?)
- The Catholic Telegraph-Register, Archdiocese of Cincinnati (1937–1961)
  - Catholic Telegraph-Register, Dayton–Miami Valley Edition (1939–1961)
- The Columbus Register, Diocese of Columbus (1940–before 1951)
- The Eastern Kansas Register, Diocese of Kansas City in Kansas (1939–?)
- The Inland Register, Diocese of Spokane (1942–?)
- The Lake Shore Visitor-Register, Diocese of Erie (1938–?)
- The Messenger, Des Moines Edition of The Register (1941–?)
- The Register, Altoona Edition, Diocese of Altoona (1934–?)
- The Register, Arizona Edition (1940–?)
- The Register, Central California Edition, Diocese of Monterey–Fresno (1929–?)
- The Register, Duluth Edition, Diocese of Duluth (1937–?)
- The Register, Eastern Montana Edition, Diocese of Great Falls (1931–?)
- The Register, Intermountain Catholic Edition, Diocese of Salt Lake (1937–?)
- The Register, Kansas City, Missouri, Edition, Diocese of Kansas City (1939–?)
- The Register, La Crosse Edition, Diocese of La Crosse (1936–?)
- The Register, Local Edition, Archdiocese of Denver (1938–1970)
- The Register, Nebraska Edition, Diocese of Grand Island (1931–?)
- The Register, Nevada Edition, Diocese of Reno (1932–?)
- The Register, Northwestern Kansas Edition, Diocese of Salina (1937–?)
- The Register, Peoria Edition, Diocese of Peoria (1934–?)
- The Register, Santa Fe Edition, Archdiocese of Santa Fe (1934–?)
- The Register, Southern Nebraska Edition, Diocese of Lincoln (1932–?)
- The Register, St. Cloud Edition, Diocese of Saint Cloud (1938–?)
- The Register, Superior California Edition, Diocese of Sacramento (1932–before 1951)
- The Register, Superior California–Nevada Edition, Dioceses of Reno and Sacramento (1930–1932)
- The Register, Tennessee Edition, Diocese of Nashville (1937–?)
- The Register, Texas Panhandle Edition, Diocese of Amarillo (1936–?)
- The Register, West Virginia Edition, Diocese of Wheeling (1934–?)
- The Register, Western Montana Edition, Diocese of Helena (1932–?)
- The Southern Colorado Register, Diocese of Pueblo (1945–1967)
- The St. Louis Register, Archdiocese of St. Louis (1941–?)
- The Steubenville Register, Diocese of Steubenville (1945–?)

== Notable people ==
- Matthew Bunson, senior editor
- Greg Burke
- Raymond J. de Souza, contributor
- Robert J. Fox, columnist

== See also ==
- Catholic News Agency
- List of Catholic newspapers and magazines in the United States
