= Tim Gilmore =

Tim Gilmore is an American author based in Jacksonville, Florida, who has written numerous books and maintains a blog, Jax Psycho Geo, a growing collection of over 800 stories about various locations in Northeast Florida. He holds a Ph.D. from the University of Florida and teaches Literature and Writing at Florida State College at Jacksonville (FSCJ). Gilmore and his wife, fellow professor Jo Carlisle, founded the JaxbyJax Literary Arts festival. He posts story portraits on his blog, which he describes as "literary true-crime, anti-racism, historical narrative nonfiction, Southern noir". He is a native and lifelong resident of Jacksonville, and has written poetry, fiction, and non-fiction books on subjects including the history of the city, Eartha White, violent crime, island squatter Rollians Christopher, Virginia King, and Ottis Toole. Gilmore is the author of The Wilderness and Willie Browne (2024) and 25 other books, including The Mad Atlas of Virginia King ((2015) and Devil in the Baptist Church: Bob Gray's Unholy Trinity (2016).

Gilmore says he learned the term that became the namesake of his blog from the University of North Florida professor, Alexander Menocal: "He introduced me to the term psychogeography, the psychology of geography which is the psychology of place. So I started looking around and exploring different places that I thought were interesting around town".

== Career ==
The son of Leslie William Gilmore and Joan Irene Gilmore (née Keene), Gilmore was raised in a staunchly fundamentalist Christian household and attended Trinity Christian Academy, where his parents worked in the early 1970s. (Note: The founder of Trinity Church and Trinity Christian Academy, Robert Gray, was arrested in 2006 on charges of sexually molesting children in his church in the 1960s and 1970s. Several women then came forward and accused Gray of having sexually abused them when they were aged 5 to 10 and in the first and second grades at the academy. He died in jail in 2007, awaiting trial on four counts of capital sexual battery, after talking openly about assaulting children.) He enrolled in the public school system in his junior year of high school. According to Folio Weekly, he began writing when he was seven or eight years old and remembers the crucial moment he realized that being a writer was "a big deal". Gilmore's mother published a 23-page autobiography when he was still very young, and the image of her typewriter sitting on the kitchen table is a memory he clings to. He told Liza Mitchell: "I remember a kid asking me when I was about eight years old if my mother was a writer. I'd never thought about that word before, but it sounded important and magical to me. I said yes. It stuck. Writing is a calling."

According to a feature article in First Coast Magazine, Gilmore did not go to college immediately after graduating high school: "I wrote constantly growing up ... but I didn't show it to anybody." In his late 20s he returned to school and then he began meeting other writers. "I stuck around for my master's and that's when I started meeting people."

As a student at the University of North Florida, Gilmore, along with Homa Mojadidi and Nick Mansito, created a forum, deadpaper.com, for writers and aspiring writers to present their work to a literary audience. The website showcased a variety of works including "poetry, short fiction, novellas, novels, social commentary and a calendar of spoken-word events". Speaking to a reporter from the student newspaper, he called Deadpaper "a literary village that's centered on literary activity in Jacksonville and St. Augustine."

Gilmore has taught literature and English at Florida State College at Jacksonville since 2006, and taught a course called "Ghost Stories". Previously, he edited the Northeast Florida literary e-zine deadpaper for two years, while his writing, according to the literary journal Flock, appeared in Exquisite Corpse, Fiction Fix, 580 Split, Jack Magazine, and other publications. An interviewer wrote in 2012:

He has visited Panama and Mexico and England. He has driven forklifts and sold vacuum cleaners. He has grown beans and tomatoes and winter greens and herbs. He has held hatchling bluebirds in his hands. He has robbed bees. He knows the difference between the Sublime and the Beautiful. He’s bad at math. He needs to wash his car. He has horrible hay fever.

In 2017 Gilmore conducted a phone interview of Donal Godfrey, who was speaking from his home in Monrovia, Liberia. On February 16, 1964, Godfrey had survived a bombing by the Ku Klux Klan of his family's house in Jacksonville.

Years later, Hal Jacobs, a filmmaker living in Decatur, Georgia, read the piece Gilmore had written about the bombing and its aftermath. Jacobs had grown up in the same Murray Hill neighborhood as Godfrey, and decided to make a documentary of the incident called "Just Another Bombing? This is Donal and Iona's Story". In 2022, Godfrey and his mother Iona returned, with some hesitation, to Jacksonville to be interviewed by Jacobs. They visited the place where their house once was, and stood before Lackawanna Elementary, where Donal had been the first Black student. Two years later, they returned again, to view the first screening of the film at the University of North Florida.

In an article about the removal of statues, part of a large Confederate monument, from Springfield Park (formerly Confederate Park), the Washington Post noted that Gilmore has written extensively about Jacksonville's's racist past, and that he credited the city's mayor, Donna Deegan, with taking action on the controversial issue. The paper quoted his statement: "Mayor Deegan has caught us up with where we should have been sometime well back in the 20th century. Deegan has put an end to the Lost Cause lie in Jacksonville." Two months earlier, before the statues had come down, Gilmore said, "I think that the difficulty Jacksonville has had in figuring out what to do with the monuments that were built to praise the defense of slavery is as much a symbol of how the city is dealing with its history as the monuments themselves."

In an interview he conducted for Burrow Press in the lobby of Sun-Ray Cinema, an independent movie theater in the Five Points district of Jacksonville, Hurley Winkler quoted Gilmore:

There are a lot of people in the South who want that story to be cleaned up and whitewashed. To say that the Confederacy was just about states' rights, and black people fought for the Confederacy, and nonsense like that—I feel that if the South is ever going to be the best South it can be, it has to own up, take responsibility, and tell the truth. Only once you do that do you figure out how to be better. I want it to be the best place it can be.

Mark Woods, a columnist for the Florida Times-Union, describes Gilmore as "a prolific local chronicler of local characters, both on his website and in his books. He often gravitates toward eccentric people and overlooked places, full of history and mystery." Local journalist Anne Schindler says Gilmore "[...] likes to think of his blog as a literary companion to Jacksonville, but also a way to help the city reckon with its past." Arbus Magazine calls him a "historian [...] who knows a lot about bizarre, local lore and our city's most idiosyncratic characters."

Gilmore writes,

Historically, Jacksonville hasn't told its story well. It chased the early motion picture industry out of town shortly after running James Weldon and J. Rosamond Johnson off. It forgot its great historic architect, Henry John Klutho, before he was even dead, left him bitter, and tore down his buildings. It's barely acknowledged its poets, its artists, its thinkers. Even now, outsider art masterworks like the Jax-indigenous Whetstonian and Coquina Gates are on the verge of oblivion.

As reported by Liza Mitchell, Gilmore conceived the JaxbyJax Literary Festival as an venue for the city's literary figures to read selections from their works. A student showcase provides a platform for upcoming writers to have their voices heard by the literary community as well. She quotes Gilmore:

Jacksonville will never be Paris or Seattle, nor need it be. Austin isn't Paris either, but it's a damn fine town. Jacksonville just needs to be the best Jacksonville it can be. In order to do that, and I think the city's writers have a real responsibility in their reflection of the city, Jacksonville has to know what it's been."

In 2023, he published his book, The Culture Wars of Warren Folks, in which he investigates racism, societal division and cultural changes in Florida during the 1950s and 1960s and through the 1990s. The book considers the life of a local white barber, an anti-Semite and an avowed racist segregationist, who made headlines for decades in the local news with his public antics "waving inflammatory placards, pestering local reporters, choosing hot-button issues, [and] propagating conspiracy theories". Gilmore says his book tells important local, regional and national Black history and seeks the counsel of prominent Black voices.

Gilmore published The Wilderness and Willie Browne in 2024, about a man who lived alone in his small cabin in the woods with no running water or electricity for decades before he died in 1970, bequeathing hundreds of acres of pristine land and marshes he owned to the Nature Conservancy. This land overlooking the St. Johns River is now a 600-hundred acre park called the Theodore Roosevelt Area, part of the Timucuan Ecological and Historic Preserve.

In 2025, he published When We Tried to Save the Castle, the history of a mansion in the Riverside neighborhood and the "immigrants and spies ... herpetologists and hippies" who figure in its story. The book tells of the city's historic preservation movement and has a foreword by the local historian, Wayne Wood.

Gilmore has written extensively about the Jacksonville artist Memphis Wood and the resurgence of interest in her work, along with an ongoing reassessment of its aesthetic value. He describes her efforts to get art taken seriously in the community, her dedication to teaching the subject to generations of students, and the long process of forging her own artistic identity.

== Personal life ==
Gilmore is married to fellow FSCJ English professor Jo Carlisle and has two daughters. He described himself as a Cormac McCarthy fan in a 2024 interview, saying that he has assigned McCarthy's book, The Road, to numerous classes over the years. He recommends works such as Peter Ackroyd's novels Chatterton and Hawksmoor, and Toni Morrison's novel, Beloved, which tells the story of formerly enslaved persons whose home is haunted by a malevolent spirit.

After writing on his blog about protests in Jacksonville, he told the Florida Times-Union, in reference to the similarities between past and present protests:

In most of my writing, I try to juxtapose what's happened in the past with what's happening now. The patterns are often uncanny, ghostly even. [...] What's happening now is deeply connected to what's been happening for years, decades, even centuries. And what's happened before and is happening now deeply influences the events of years to come. It's a tapestry. We never see how all the dots connect, but I think we have to see as many connections as we can.

== Awards ==
Gilmore received a Distinguished Faculty Award in 2018 for his teaching of Literature and Writing at Florida State College at Jacksonville. The Cultural Council of Greater Jacksonville named Gilmore Literary Artist of the Year, also in 2018. The same year Gilmore served on the Jacksonville City Council's "Civil Rights History Task Force" and was presented a City of Jacksonville Melody Starr Anne Bishop Community Service Award.

== Books ==
=== Non-fiction ===
- This Kind of City: Ghost Stories and Psychological Landscapes (2012))
- Stalking Ottis Toole: A Southern Gothic (2013), he also adapted it as a play, and it was staged at FSCJ
- In Search of Eartha White: Storehouse for the People (2014)
- The Ocean Highway At Night (2014)
- Ghost Story / Love Song: A Collection Of Clues (2015)
- The Mad Atlas of Virginia King (2015)
- Central Georgia Schizophrenia (Everything Buried Will Rise) (2016)
- The Devil in the Baptist Church: Bob Gray's Unholy Trinity (2016)
- Goat Island Hermit: The State of Florida vs. Rollians Christopher (2018)
- Channeling Anna Fletcher: a nonfiction novel (2019)
- Repossessions: Mass Shootings in Baymeadows (2019), a work of documentary theater, from interviews
- Murder Capital, 8 Stories 1890s – 1980s (2020)
- Box Broken Open: The Architecture of Ted Pappas (2022)
- The Culture Wars of Warren Folks (2023)
- The Wilderness and Willie Browne (2024)
- We Are All Used Books: 70 Conversations with Ron Chamblin
- When We Tried to Save the Castle (2025)

=== Fiction ===
- Discarded Windows: Scenes Dreamt In Old Glass (2013)
- Doors in the Light and the Water: The Life and Collected Work of Empty Boat (2013)
- Ghost Compost: Strange Little Stories (2013)
- The Book of Isaiah: A Vision of the Founder of a City (2017), illustrated by Shep Shepard
- Pink Motel: A Christmas Tale (2021)

=== Poetry ===
- Flights of Crows: Poems, 2002-2006 (2006)
- Horoscopes for Goblins: Poems, 2006-2009 (2012)
- Jesus of the South (2016)
- Solstice: A Life Story (2024)
