= The House of Doctor Dee =

1993 novel by Peter Ackroyd

- First edition
- Author: Peter Ackroyd
- Cover artist: unknown (c. 1594), portrait of John Dee from Ashmolean Museum
- Language: English
- Publisher: Hamish Hamilton
- Publication date: September 1993
- Publication place: United Kingdom
- Media type: Print (Hardback & Paperback)
- Pages: 288
- ISBN: 978-0-241-12500-7
- OCLC: 788032939
- Preceded by: English Music
- Followed by: Dan Leno and the Limehouse Golem

The House of Doctor Dee is a 1993 novel by the English author Peter Ackroyd.

== Plot summary ==
The narrative alternates between two timelines, in the 1990s and the sixteenth century.

In modern London, researcher Matthew Palmer inherits his father's house in Clerkenwell and begins to take an interest in its history. With the help of his friend Daniel Moore he discovers that it was once owned by the Elizabethan alchemist John Dee. He has strange dreams in the house and becomes increasingly aware of supernatural events.

In Tudor London, John Dee works as a builder of stage illusions. He describes his backstory, Cambridge education and tour of Europe to visit the house of Paracelsus. He becomes interested in the occult and plans to create a homunculus in a glass tube. Dee meets Edward Kelley, another occultist who claims to have discovered a crystal ball in Glastonbury Abbey that allows him to communicate with spirits. Kelley moves into Dee's house in Clerkenwell, though Dee's servants Philip and Audrey mistrust him. Dee and Kelley begin to perform scrying rituals with the crystal, in which they see and hear Matthew and Daniel's activities in the house.

Matthew discovers papers in the house describing "Doctor Dee's recipe" for creating a homunculus. Matthew remembers almost nothing of his childhood, in which his mother implies that he was abused by his father. Matthew reads through his father's papers and learns that he too was interested in the occult, had bought the house because of its connection to John Dee and attempted to perform magical rituals in it with Daniel, who admits to having been his lover.

Dee's wife Katherine becomes seriously ill, and Philip finally convinces Dee that Kelley is poisoning her. Dee discovers letters revealing that Kelley intends to kill Katherine and steal the homunculus. Dee throws Kelley out of the house. Katherine later dies, but continues to speak to Dee in visions, encouraging him to "see the world with love".

Matthew's father had also bought a lockup in Wapping on a site that was owned by Dr Dee. Matthew and his mother visit the lockup, where they see Dee in the distance. On returning to the house Matthew smells burning and hears the frantic voices of Dee's household. Daniel comes to the house and explains that Matthew is himself Dee's homunculus.

Back in Tudor times, Dee finds the upper part of the house on fire after Kelley has knocked over a lamp while returning to steal papers and the homunculus tube. Dee overhears a conversation between Matthew and Daniel in a vision, and the novel itself becomes part of the story, with Peter Ackroyd implying that the words he has written are not his own but Dr Dee's.

== Reception ==
There is a page devoted to the novel in 1001 Books You Must Read Before You Die. The novel is discussed extensively in the books The Heritage of Hermes: Alchemy in Contemporary British Literature and The Golden Egg: Alchemy in Art and Literature in relation to alchemy.
