= Andrew R. Nicholas =

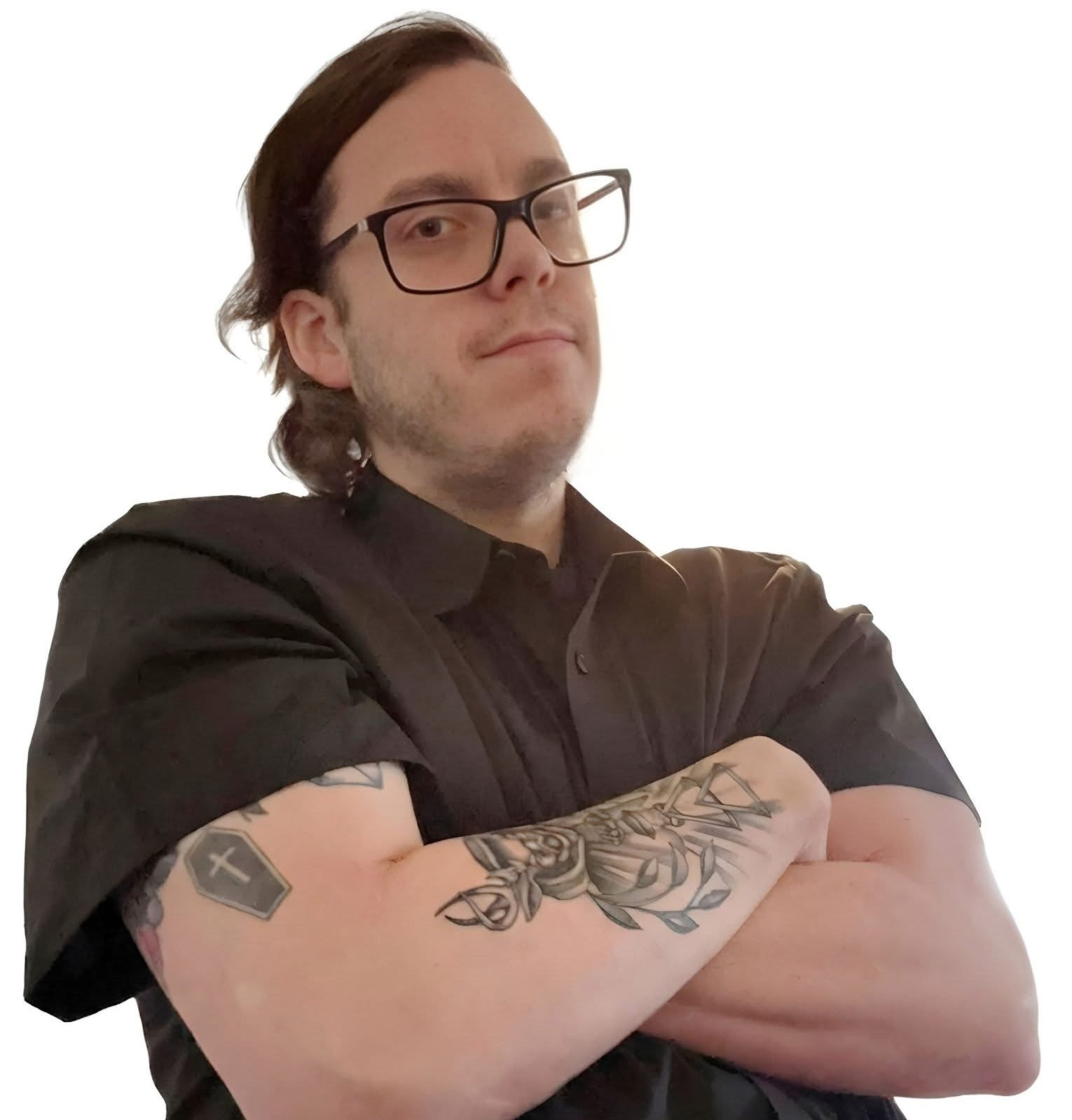
- Born: Andrew Ryan Nicholas; February 15, 1989 (age 37); Tampa, Florida
- Education: University of North Florida (BA); Anderson University (MBA)
- Parent(s): Daniel Andrew Nicholas; Elizabeth Moody
- Relatives: Maxey Dell Moody III (grandfather)

Andrew Ryan Nicholas (born February 15, 1989) is an American author, writer and historian.

== Career ==
After graduating from University of North Florida in 2013 Nicholas proceeded to work a variety of warehouse jobs including Interline Brands. In 2019 Nicholas began writing his first book for Arcadia Publishing called Lake City and Columbia County because he had been living in Lake City, Florida. In 2020 Nicholas began writing a second book called Jacksonville in the 1920s which was released in 2021. Nicholas began writing for the website The Jaxson in 2020 and Jacksonville Today in 2023 on local history of Jacksonville. In 2023 Nicholas published his third book called Exploring the St. Johns River. In 2025, Nicholas published his fourth book Brewing In Jacksonville.

Nicholas researched a local cemetery in Jacksonville called Camp Captain Mooney Cemetery in 2021 to determine its origins. His researched along with Tim Gilmore discovered that the cemetery was mostly a Confederate fabrication by the United Daughters of the Confederacy and that Captain Mooney had never been to Camp Mooney.

== Personal life ==
Nicholas grew up in Jacksonville. Nicholas is the son of Elizabeth Moody and grandson of Maxey Dell Moody III. From 2005 to 2018 Nicholas was an avid guitar player and was once in a band called Arlynn with local drummer from Skyliner Benjamin Brenner.

== Published books ==
- Nicholas, Andrew R. (2020). Lake City and Columbia County. Charleston, South Carolina: Arcadia Publishing.
- Nicholas, Andrew R. (2021). Jacksonville In The 1920s. Charleston, South Carolina: Arcadia Publishing.
- Nicholas, Andrew R. (2023). Exploring the St. Johns River. Charleston, South Carolina: Arcadia Publishing.
- Nicholas, Andrew R. (2025). Brewing in Jacksonville. Charleston, South Carolina: Arcadia Publishing.

== Published articles ==
- Nicholas, Andrew R.; Delaney, Bill (July 2, 2020). "The Photography of Max Moody Jr". The Jaxson.
- Nicholas, Andrew R.; Delaney, Bill (August 10, 2020). "The Muller house: Jax Beach's oldest residence". The Jaxson.
- Nicholas, Andrew R. (December 4, 2020). "A history of The Florida Times-Union". The Jaxson.
- Nicholas, Andrew R. (August 18, 2021). "Fort Caroline: The French settlement on the St. Johns". The Jaxson.
- Nicholas, Andrew R. (February 22, 2022). "The Civil War photography of Jacksonville". The Jaxson.
- Nicholas, Andrew R. (March 8, 2023). "Nirvana Live at the Morocco Shrine Auditorium". The Jaxson.
- Nicholas, Andrew R. (August 23, 2023). "The history of the Maxey Moody Sr. house". Jacksonville Today.
- Nicholas, Andrew R. (November 14, 2023). "Jacksonville in the 1870s". Jacksonville Today.
- Nicholas, Andrew R. (December 19, 2024). "Merrill-Stevens: Legacy of the Southside Shipyard". The Jaxson.
- Nicholas, Andrew R. (March 11, 2026). "Latter-day Saints of Jacksonville: A history of the Mormon church". Jacksonville Today.
