= Bishop John J. Snyder High School =

Location
- 5001 Samaritan Way; Jacksonville, Florida 32210; United States
- 30.251855°N 81.837640°W

Information
- Type: Private school
- Religious affiliation: Roman Catholic
- Established: 2002
- Founder: Bishop John J. Snyder
- Oversight: Roman Catholic Diocese of St. Augustine
- NCES School ID: A0300789
- Principal: Deacon David Yazdiya
- Teaching staff: 28.3 (on an FTE basis)
- Grades: 9–12
- Gender: Co-educational
- Enrollment: 445 (2022-2023)
- Student to teacher ratio: 16.0
- Colors: Red and gold, occasionally black
- Slogan: "Competence, Conscience, Compassion"
- Mascot: The Cardinal
- Nickname: Cardinals, Cards
- Accreditation: Southern Association of Colleges and Schools
- Newspaper: Cardinal Chronicles
- Website: www.bishopsnyder.org

Bishop John J. Snyder High School is a private Roman Catholic college preparatory high school in Jacksonville, Florida, United States. It was established in 2002 and located in the Roman Catholic Diocese of St. Augustine. It is named for John J. Snyder, bishop of the diocese from 1979 to 2000, and the campus was blessed by Snyder before opening. He was a regular visitor of the school while he lived. He personally chose the mascot of the school, the Cardinals.

== History ==
Bishop Snyder was established in 2002 to serve the growing Catholic population in the west Jacksonville area. The school was established on a 50-acre site with a cost of $11 million. It is named after Bishop John J. Snyder who had retired as the eighth Bishop of the Diocese of St. Augustine in 2000. The first students at Bishop Snyder were 75 freshmen in 2002.

== Alumni ==
- Ross Minor (2016) - shooting survivor, accessibility content creator, former Paralympic swimmer
- Andrew R. Nicholas (2007) - historian and author
