= Jane Goldman =

British screenwriter and producer (born 1970)

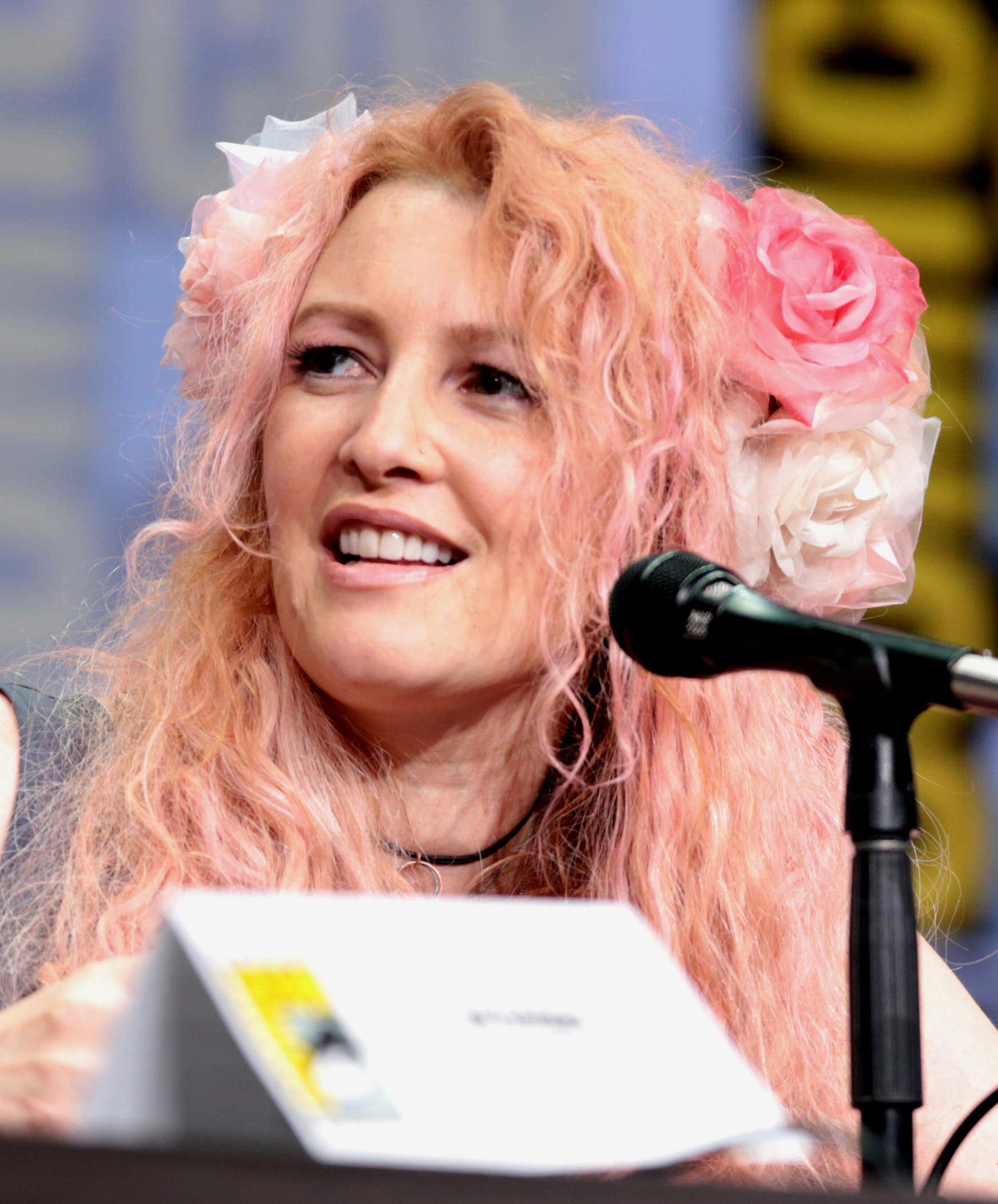
- Goldman at the 2017 San Diego Comic-Con
- Born: Jane Loretta Anne Goldman; 11 June 1970 (age 56); Hammersmith, London, England
- Education: King Alfred School, London
- Occupations: Screenwriter; film producer; journalist; author
- Years active: 1993–present
- Spouse: Jonathan Ross (m. 1988)
- Children: 3

Jane Loretta Anne Goldman (born 11 June 1970) is an English screenwriter, film producer, journalist and author. She collaborated with director Matthew Vaughn on the screenplays of Kingsman: The Secret Service (2014) and its sequel Kingsman: The Golden Circle (2017), as well as X-Men: First Class (2011), Kick-Ass (2010), and Stardust (2007). Goldman also worked on the story of X-Men: Days of Future Past (2014), the sequel to First Class, again in partnership with Vaughn. Both met high critical praise for their work.

Goldman's first solo screenplay is The Woman in Black (2012). She wrote the script for The Limehouse Golem and Tim Burton's Miss Peregrine's Home for Peculiar Children, both released in 2016. She has written books including The X-Files Book of the Unexplained (1995) and the novel Dreamworld (2000). Goldman presented her own TV show, Jane Goldman Investigates (2003–04), a non-fiction series on the paranormal, for the channel Living.

== Early life ==
Goldman was raised in a liberal, middle-class family in north London, the only child of a Jewish father, Stuart, and a Buddhist mother, Amanda. She attended the King Alfred School, an independent school in Hampstead, until the age of 15 before moving to the United States to follow Boy George on tour. Upon her return to the UK, she took a job as an entertainment reporter with the Daily Star. When she was 16, she met TV presenter Jonathan Ross. They married in 1988, when Goldman was 18 and Ross was 28. They have two daughters and a son.

== Professional career ==
=== Journalism, books and TV ===
Goldman became a freelance writer at the age of 19. As a journalist, she worked on newspapers and magazines including Just Seventeen, Cosmopolitan, The Times, Evening Standard, Zero, Daily Star, Total Guitar, Game Zone and Sega Zone.

Goldman's books include: Thirteen-Something (1993), Streetsmarts: A Teenager's Safety Guide (1996), Sussed and Streetwise (1997), the two-volume best-selling series The X-Files Book of the Unexplained (1997), her novel Dreamworld (2000), and Do the Right Thing (2003), among others.

Between 2003 and 2004 she had her own television series; Jane Goldman Investigates researched the paranormal and was transmitted by channel Living. Goldman is in the production teams of a number of TV shows, including The Big Fat Quiz of the Year.

She modelled for Fantasie Bras in 2000.

=== Screenwriting ===
Goldman was part of the writing team for David Baddiel's short-lived sitcom Baddiel's Syndrome, in 2001. She co-wrote the screenplay of Stardust (2007), directed by Matthew Vaughn and based on Neil Gaiman's novel of the same name. Gaiman introduced Goldman to Vaughn to help with the adaptation process. The film received many accolades and gave the screenwriters a Hugo Award for Best Dramatic Presentation, Long Form.

Goldman became a frequent collaborator with Vaughn. In a 2011 interview, Goldman said that when she works with Vaughn he acts as architect while she does the construction work and interior design. Goldman co-wrote Vaughn's next films, the comic-book adaptations Kick-Ass (2010) and X-Men: First Class (2011), both films won strong praise. Kick-Ass has developed a cult following, while Rotten Tomatoes consensus says of X-Men: First Class: "With a strong script, stylish direction, and powerful performances from its well-rounded cast, X-Men: First Class is a welcome return to form for the franchise." Goldman has described the film as an "alternate history" for the X-Men, saying that while rebooting, the writers did not want to go fully "against the canon of the X-Men trilogy", comparing to the various approaches the comic had in over fifty years of publication.

She was co-writer with Vaughn and Peter Straughan for the 2011 drama-thriller The Debt, directed by John Madden based on the 2007 Israeli film HaHov. Goldman adapted for Hammer The Woman in Black, a gothic horror film based on Susan Hill's novel, the first solo screenplay by Goldman. The film was directed by James Watkins and was released in 2012 to generally positive reviews. It won the 2013 Empire Award for Best Horror.

Goldman shares writing credit on X-Men: Days of Future Past with Matthew Vaughn and Simon Kinberg, after which she co-wrote with Vaughn the script for Kingsman: The Secret Service (2015), based on the comic book by Mark Millar and Dave Gibbons.

She wrote the script for Miss Peregrine's Home for Peculiar Children, an adaptation of the Ransom Riggs novel of the same name, which was directed by Tim Burton. The next project was The Limehouse Golem, an adaptation of Peter Ackroyd's 1994 murder mystery novel Dan Leno and the Limehouse Golem. Goldman had read the book years before she was a professional screenwriter and kept it in mind as a potential project. She told ScreenCraft: "What's funny is that I read the book long before I was screenwriting. I think it was the only time that I can remember when I read a book and thought, 'Gosh, I hope somebody makes a movie of this!' ... Weirdly, years later I was on a film jury together with the producer whom I had read had the rights and I asked him whatever happened to the adaptation and said that I loved the book. That is how this came about, because he said the rights were free again and asked, 'Do you want to do it?'"

Goldman and Vaughn collaborated again for the screenplay of Kingsman: The Golden Circle, the sequel to The Secret Service. The film was released in 2017.

In May that year, HBO announced Goldman as one of four writers working on a potential pilot for a Game of Thrones spin-off, the others being Carly Wray, Max Borenstein, and Brian Helgeland. Goldman worked with George R. R. Martin, the author of A Song of Ice and Fire, the series of novels upon which the original show is based. In June 2018, it was confirmed that Goldman's pilot had been greenlit by HBO, and would focus on "the world's descent from the golden Age of Heroes into its darkest hour", thousands of years before the events of Game of Thrones. Naomi Watts was cast in a lead role and S. J. Clarkson was chosen as director for the opening episode. In late October 2019, it was announced that HBO would not be moving forward with the pilot.

In December 2017, Goldman was announced as the writer of Disney's live-action adaptation of The Little Mermaid. She was not credited in the final script.

Goldman co-wrote the 2020 adaptation of Daphne du Maurier's Gothic romance Rebecca, directed by Ben Wheatley.

=== Upcoming projects ===
In May 2024, Goldman and her screenwriter daughter, Honey Goldman, were in negotiations to write Barbarella, a remake of the 1968 science fiction classic. Edgar Wright was in negotiations to direct, with Sydney Sweeney in the lead role and Sony Pictures as distributor.

== In popular culture ==
Alongside her husband, broadcaster Jonathan Ross, Goldman appeared as a character in Neil Gaiman's short story "The Facts in the Case of the Departure of Miss Finch" in 1996. Gaiman is a personal friend of the couple.

== Bibliography ==
Year	Title	Publisher	Notes	Ref
1993	Thirteensomething: A Survivor's Guide	Puffin Books		
1994	Sex: How? Why? What?	Piccadilly Press		
1995	For Weddings, a Funeral and When You Can't Flush the Loo	Puffin Books		
1995	Sussed and Streetwise	Piccadilly Press (London, England)	Reprinted as Streetsmarts: A Teenager's Safety Guide, Barron's Educational Series (Hauppauge, NY), 1996	
1995	The X-Files Book of the Unexplained – Vol. 1	Harper Prism		
1997	The X-Files Book of the Unexplained – Vol. 2	Harper Prism		
2000	Dreamworld	Pocket Books, MTV Books		
2003	Do the Right Thing: A Teenager's Survival Guide for Tricky Situations	Piccadilly Press		
2008	The X-Files Book of the Unexplained: Volumes 1 and 2	Harper Collins		

== Filmography ==
=== Film ===
Year	Title	Functioned as		Director	Notes
Year	Title	Writer	Producer	Director	Notes
2007	Stardust	Yes	No	Matthew Vaughn	Co-writer with Vaughn
2010	Kick-Ass	Yes	Yes	Matthew Vaughn	Co-writer with Vaughn
2010	The Debt	Yes	No	Matthew Vaughn	Co-writer with Vaughn and Peter Straughan
2011	James Bond Supports International Women's Day	Yes	No	Sam Taylor-Johnson	Short film
2011	X-Men: First Class	Yes	No	Matthew Vaughn	Co-writer with Vaughn and Ashley Edward Miller & Zack Stentz; story by Bryan Singer and Sheldon Turner
2012	The Woman in Black	Yes	No	James Watkins	
2014	X-Men: Days of Future Past	Story	No	Bryan Singer	Co-writer of story only, with Matthew Vaughn and Simon Kinberg
2015	Kingsman: The Secret Service	Yes	Yes	Matthew Vaughn	Co-writer with Vaughn
2016	Miss Peregrine's Home for Peculiar Children	Yes	No	Tim Burton	
2016	The Limehouse Golem	Yes	Yes	Juan Carlos Medina	
2017	Kingsman: The Golden Circle	Yes	Yes	Matthew Vaughn	Co-writer with Matthew Vaughn
2020	Rebecca	Yes	No	Ben Wheatley	Co-writer with Joe Shrapnel and Anna Waterhouse

=== Television ===
Year	Title	Functioned as		Notes	Ref
Year	Title	Writer	Producer	Notes	Ref
2001	Baddiel's Syndrome	Yes	No	Additional material	
2003–04	Jane Goldman Investigates	No	Yes	Also presenter	
2004–present	The Big Fat Quiz of the Year	No	Yes		
2007–15	The Big Fat Anniversary Quiz	No	Yes		
2012	The Big Fat Quiz of the 00s	No	Yes		
2012–13	The Big Fat Quiz of the 80s	No	Yes		
2012–13	The Big Fat Quiz of the 90s	No	Yes		
2016–18	The Big Fat Quiz of Everything	No	Yes		

== Awards and nominations ==
Year	Award	Category	Work	Result	Ref
2008	Glamour Woman of the Year Awards	Filmmaker of the Year	Body of work	Won	
2008	Hugo Award	Best Dramatic Presentation, Long Form	Stardust	Won	
2010	British Independent Film Awards	Best Screenplay	Kick-Ass	Nominated	
2010	Scream Awards	Best Scream-play	Kick-Ass	Nominated	
2010	Women in Film and Television	UK Film Council Writing Award	Body of work	Won	
2010	Writers' Guild of Great Britain Awards	Best Screenplay	Kick-Ass	Won	
2011	Evening Standard British Film Awards	Best Screenplay	Kick-Ass	Nominated	
2011	Glamour Woman of the Year Awards	Filmmaker of the Year	Body of work	Won	
2012	Bram Stoker Awards	Best Screenplay	The Woman in Black	Nominated	
2016	Saturn Awards	Best Writing	Kingsman: The Secret Service	Nominated	

Goldman also won the Cosmopolitan magazine Woman of Tomorrow award for achievement in journalism.
