= The Limehouse Golem =

2016 British film by Juan Carlos Medina

- Theatrical release poster
- Directed by: Juan Carlos Medina
- Screenplay by: Jane Goldman
- Based on: Dan Leno and the Limehouse Golem by Peter Ackroyd
- Produced by: Elizabeth Karlsen; Stephen Woolley; Joanna Laurie
- Starring: Bill Nighy; Olivia Cooke; Douglas Booth; Daniel Mays; Sam Reid; María Valverde; Henry Goodman; Morgan Watkins; Eddie Marsan
- Cinematography: Simon Dennis
- Edited by: Justin Krish
- Music by: Johan Söderqvist
- Production companies: New Sparta Films; HanWay Films; LipSync Productions; Day Tripper Films; Number 9 Films; Ingenious Meida; Cutting Edge Group
- Distributed by: Lionsgate
- Release dates: 10 September 2016 (TIFF); 1 September 2017 (United Kingdom)
- Running time: 105 minutes
- Country: United Kingdom
- Language: English
- Box office: $2.3 million

The Limehouse Golem is a 2016 British mystery film directed by Juan Carlos Medina from a screenplay by Jane Goldman. The film, an adaptation of Peter Ackroyd's 1994 murder mystery novel Dan Leno and the Limehouse Golem, stars Olivia Cooke, Bill Nighy and Douglas Booth.

The film had its world premiere at the Toronto International Film Festival on 10 September 2016. It was released in the United Kingdom on 1 September 2017, by Lionsgate.

== Plot ==
A series of murders has shaken the community of Limehouse in the docklands of Victorian London. Journalists dub the murderer the Golem, after the Jewish legend. When music-hall star Elizabeth Cree is accused of poisoning her husband, John, on the same night as the last Golem murder, Inspector John Kildare discovers evidence linking John Cree to the murders and wants to solve the cases before Elizabeth is hanged.

Kildare finds a diary written by the Golem of the crimes, handwritten in a printed copy of Thomas De Quincey's essay "On Murder Considered as one of the Fine Arts", in a collected volume in the British Museum Library Reading Room. He deduces that the Golem must be one of the four men who were in the library on the date of the last entry: Dan Leno, Karl Marx, George Gissing and John Cree. Kildare acquires handwriting samples of the other three men, while listening to Elizabeth's story about how she was the daughter of an unmarried mother and went from sewing sail-cloths at the docks to becoming a star.

When Elizabeth's abusive mother died, she was befriended by Dan Leno and fell in with his music-hall troupe, performing comic songs while dressed as a man. Her act quickly becomes second in popularity only to Leno, but she aspires to become a dramatic actor. She is wooed by John Cree, a struggling playwright. Her fellow performer, Aveline Ortega (María Valverde), becomes jealous since she herself is interested in John, and sabotages Elizabeth's first dramatic role.

Elizabeth is entrapped by the theatre's owner, a man known as 'Uncle' (Eddie Marsan) and is forced to pose nude for photographs and to beat him for his sexual gratification. She tells John, who offers to marry her and keep her safe. Elizabeth accepts and Kildare notes that Uncle died suddenly only days later, leaving the theatre to Dan Leno. John's career stalls, and he grows bitter toward Elizabeth, who supports him financially, but is only interested in what he can do for her career. She hires Aveline as a maid and facilitates an affair between Aveline and John so that she will not have to keep sleeping with him. The two remain estranged until John Cree's poisoning.

Kildare finds a handwritten copy of the play written by Cree before his death on the day Elizabeth is to be hanged. He finds it to be a match with the diary and gets an hour's postponement to her sentence, hoping that revealing John Cree's crimes will cause her sentence to be commuted. Kildare instructs her to write a statement, but she writes the confession "I am the Golem", her handwriting matching the diary. Kildare realises that she is the true Golem rather than her husband. She killed 'Uncle' and began committing murders as the Golem to make a lasting name for herself, poisoning her husband when he found evidence.

Broken at this revelation, Kildare destroys Elizabeth's confession and allows her to be hanged for the murder of her husband, robbing her of the fame of being the Golem, allowing the solution that John Cree was the Golem to stand, for which Kildare is acclaimed, and granting Elizabeth the fame of having eliminated the Golem rather than the greater fame of being the Golem, which she actually desired. In the final scene, Dan Leno's troupe perform John's play, rewritten to tell Elizabeth's life story. Aveline, playing Elizabeth, dies during the hanging scene because the safety mechanism is not in place. Leno dresses as Elizabeth to continue the play. He takes a bow, and looks knowingly at Kildare in the audience. Then we no longer see Leno but Elizabeth herself on the stage.

== Cast ==
- Bill Nighy as Inspector John Kildare
- Olivia Cooke as Elizabeth “Lizzie” Cree
  - Amelia Crouch as Young Elizabeth
- Douglas Booth as Dan Leno
- Daniel Mays as Constable George Flood
- Sam Reid as John Cree
- María Valverde as Aveline Ortega
- Eddie Marsan as Uncle
- Henry Goodman as Karl Marx
- Paul Ritter as Augustus Rowley
- Morgan Watkins as George Gissing
- Peter Sullivan as Inspector Roberts
- Adam Brown as Mr Gerrard
- Clive Brunt as Charlie

== Production ==
Screenwriter Jane Goldman read the book years before she was a professional screenwriter and kept it in mind as a potential project. She explains, "What’s funny is that I read the book long before I was screenwriting. I think it was the only time that I can remember when I read a book and thought, 'Gosh, I hope somebody makes a movie of this!' ... Weirdly, years later I was on a film jury together with the producer whom I had read had the rights and I asked him whatever happened to the adaptation and said that I loved the book. That is how this came about, because he said the rights were free again and asked, 'Do you want to do it?'"

It was announced on 17 April 2015 that Alan Rickman, Olivia Cooke and Douglas Booth had been cast in leading roles for the film, to be directed by Juan Carlos Medina. Rickman later left the project due to declining health after he was diagnosed with pancreatic cancer. Principal photography for The Limehouse Golem began in October 2015 in West Yorkshire, with filming taking place in locations such as Leeds and Keighley. Production also took place in Manchester, with cast members Bill Nighy and Daniel Mays being spotted on set in Deansgate, with Nighy replacing Rickman. Principal photography concluded on 26 November 2015. Johan Söderqvist composed the film's score. The film is dedicated to Rickman, who died in January 2016.

== Release ==
The film had its world premiere at the Toronto International Film Festival on 10 September 2016. It was released in the United Kingdom on 1 September 2017 and in the United States on 8 September 2017, in a limited release and through video on demand by RLJ Entertainment.

== Reception ==
The Limehouse Golem received mostly positive reviews from film critics. It holds a 74% approval rating on review aggregator website Rotten Tomatoes, based on 78 reviews, with a weighted average of 6.4/10. On Metacritic, the film has a weighted average score of 63 out of 100, based on 20 critics, indicating "generally favorable reviews".
