= English music =

English music may refer to:

- Folk music of England
- Music of the United Kingdom
- English Music (novel), 1992 novel by Peter Ackroyd
