= London Under =

Book by Peter Ackroyd

- Cover of the first edition
- Author: Peter Ackroyd
- Language: English
- Subject: History of London
- Set in: London
- Publisher: Vintage Books
- Publication date: 2012
- Publication place: United Kingdom
- Media type: Print
- Pages: 202
- ISBN: 9780099287377
- Dewey Decimal: 942.1

London Under is a 2012 book by British biographer, novelist, and critic Peter Ackroyd about the history of underground London.

== Synopsis ==
The book '...is an introduction to everything that goes on under London'. It profiles underground constructions and natural features such as rivers, Roman amphitheaters, Victorian sewers and gang hideouts; these are written up in Ackroyd's psychogeographical style, where the landmarks themselves are described less as factual objects and more as reference points for the author's literary, figurative imagination.

== Reception ==
In The Independent Christopher Hirst wrote 'Ackroyd's stylistic brilliance explains why the book remains a rattling good read despite its pervasive psycho-geographical angst.' In Londonist Matt Brown writes 'the author is also skilled at connecting past, present and future. He notes, for example, that our modern Underground system was initiated by a man born when Marie Antoinette still possessed a head' however he also notes 'Oddly, the book begins by stating that ‘there is little interest in this vast underworld’. The bibliography, listing 40 similar volumes, begs to differ. Given the popularity of the Kingsway and Thames tunnels, and the disused Aldwych station, which all briefly opened to visitors recently, it seems a bizarre assertion' while in the London Evening Standard Stephen Smith wrote 'Sure enough, 11 years after he produced London: The Biography, he now examines the hidden organs of the capital, its "nerves" and guts and bowels' and 'We owe Ackroyd a great debt, all the same. He has memorialised London so well, it's time London returned the compliment'. The New York Times called it a "windy treasure", and considered its chapters on the London Underground to be "the true reward of the book".
