= Dan Leno and the Limehouse Golem =

Book by Peter Ackroyd

- First edition
- Author: Peter Ackroyd
- Language: English
- Publisher: Sinclair-Stevenson
- Publication date: 1994
- Publication place: United Kingdom
- Media type: Print (hardback & paperback)
- Pages: 282 pp
- ISBN: 1856195074
- Preceded by: The House of Doctor Dee
- Followed by: Blake

Dan Leno and the Limehouse Golem (published in the United States as The Trial of Elizabeth Cree) is a 1994 novel by the English author Peter Ackroyd. It is a murder mystery framed within a story featuring real historical characters, and set in a recreation of Victorian London.

== Plot summary ==
As Elizabeth Cree sits every day in a courtroom, on trial for the murder of her husband, the story moves from courthouse to music hall to the back alleys of Limehouse, a notorious district of Victorian London, teeming with the poorest of the poor, the most violent of criminals and helpless preyed-upon immigrants, following the trail of slaughter laid by the Golem, an almost mythical predecessor of Jack the Ripper. Fact and fiction blend as Dan Leno, king of the music-hall comedians, is dragged unwittingly into the investigation of some of London's most notorious murders. Karl Marx and George Gissing are connected to the same crimes.

== Reception ==
A review in The Independent on Sunday declared that "Ackroyd has pulled off the greatest coup of all, a foursquare crime novel as aesthetically pleasing as it is morally shocking". A review in The Observer called the novel "a flawlessly good read".

== Adaptations ==
In 2015, it was announced that The Limehouse Golem, a film adaptation based on the book, was planned, starring Olivia Cooke, Bill Nighy and Douglas Booth, with a script written by Jane Goldman, to be directed by Juan Carlos Medina. The film was released in September 2017.

The opera Elizabeth Cree by Kevin Puts and Mark Campbell, based on the novel, was given its world premiere by Opera Philadelphia in September 2017.

== See also ==
- Golem, a creature of Jewish legend
