= Queer City =

2017 book by Peter Ackroyd

Queer City: Gay London from Romans to the Present Day
- Author: Peter Ackroyd
- Language: English
- Subject: LGBT culture in London; LGBT history of London
- Published: London
- Publisher: Chatto & Windus (UK), Abrams Books (US)
- Publication date: 2017 (UK)/2018 (US)
- Pages: 262
- ISBN: 978-0-7011-8881-8
- Dewey Decimal: 306.766094212

Queer City: Gay London from Romans to the Present Day is a 2017 book by British biographer, novelist and critic Peter Ackroyd.

== Background and synopsis ==
Queer City follows the history and experiences of the LGBT population of London beginning with Roman Londinium and exploring the "endless loop of alternating permissiveness and censure" that followed. Queer City explores the "diversity, thrills and energy" of the "hidden city" and concludes that "In a city of superlatives, it is perhaps this endless sexual fluidity and resilience that epitomise the real triumph of London."

== Reception ==
Simon Callow wrote in The Guardian (which judged Queer City as Book of the Day) that "It was inevitable that London’s great chronicler, who happens himself to be queer, would give us the lowdown on homosex in the city. His book is predictably droll, provocative and crammed to bursting with startling facts and improbable names."

In the New Statesman, Philip Hoare described the book as "both a commemoration and a celebration of 'the ultimate triumph of London' and its diversity" and praised Ackroyd for creating "a triumphantly queer picture of a city he loves."

Mark Sanderson, writing for the London Evening Standard described Queer City as a "colourful toilet book" which "tells a torrid tale of persecution and pleasure, of blackmail and blue murder."

This is Ackroyd's second non-fiction book dealing with part of the LGBTQ world. In 1979 he published Dressing Up: Transvestism and Drag: The History of an Obsession.

== Audiobook ==
In 2018, US publisher Abrams Books released an audiobook version of Queer City narrated by British voiceover artist Will M. Watt.
