= Donal Godfrey =

Home bombing victim

Donal H Godfrey is a former elementary school student whose home was bombed in February 1964 after he was enrolled in the previously all-white Lackawanna Elementary School in Jacksonville, Florida. One man pleaded guilty, mechanic William Sterling Rosencrans Jr., and was sentenced to seven years in prison. Five other men were acquitted in a federal trial with an all-white jury. All were accused of being part of the Ku Klux Klan.

Godfrey's home was at the corner of Gilmore Street and Owen Avenue. He was six and in first grade. Godfrey and his mother were at home at the time of the bombing but were uninjured.

J. B. Stoner served as defense attorney for the acquitted defendants. Stoner also represented Martin Luther King Jr.'s assassin James Earl Ray.

Godfrey wrote a book about his life experiences titled Leaving Freedom to Find Peace: My Life's Journey. He was interviewed about the book on the podcast This Week in America by Ric Bratton.

Author Tim Gilmore interviewed him by phone from his home in Monrovia, Liberia. A new documentary about the bombing, including interviews with Godfrey and his mother, Iona King, will premiere in February 2024, the 60th anniversary of the bombing. The director of the film, Hal Jacobs, lived four streets over from Godfrey at the time of the bombing.

== See also ==
- Murray Hill, Jacksonville, Florida
