= London: The Biography =

2000 book by Peter Ackroyd

- First edition cover
- Author: Peter Ackroyd
- Language: English
- Subject: London
- Genre: Non-fiction
- Published: 2000
- Publisher: Chatto & Windus
- Publication place: United Kingdom
- Media type: Print
- Pages: 822 pp.
- ISBN: 978-0385497701

London: The Biography is a 2000 non-fiction book by Peter Ackroyd published by Chatto & Windus.

== Content ==
Ackroyd's work, following his previous work on London in one form or another, is a history of the city. It is chronologically wide in scope, proceeding from the period of the Upper Jurassic through to the period of the Druids and on to the 21st century.

Although it does have a broadly chronological aspect to its structuring, the work is organised in a thematic fashion, particularly from the late medieval period to the end of the 19th century where the approach taken is one that eschews a linear time-based narrative and instead focuses upon the organisation of the material on the basis of themes. There are sections and digressions on everything from the history of silence in relation to the city, the history of light, childhood, ghosts, prostitution, Cockney speech, graffiti, the weather, murder, suicide, theatres and drink.

The work is constructed from data and stories accumulated from a large assemblage of both primary and secondary sources that incorporate literary sources such as diaries or newspaper articles as well as maps, pictures and public street signs. There are small elements of the personal or the autobiographical, such as a discussion of Ackroyd's discovery of Fountain Court in the Temple as a child, but the tone is overwhelmingly public rather than personal.

An important aspect of the tone and methodology of the book is its tendency towards antiquarianism, a fact that is heightened by Ackroyd's lionisation of the work of John Stow, with a tendency towards a focus upon details and the microcosmic rather than grand or broad sweeps of history.

Two particular elements underlying the work are Ackroyd's belief that London is a unique metropolis on the one hand, and that on the other it has long been resistant to 'planning'. He cites the example of Paris's development under Baron Haussmann as a counterpoint and contrast.

== Critical reception ==
Some commentators have focused on Ackroyd's political perspective and how this affects his analysis. In one example, Iain Sinclair argued that his message is fundamentally conservative: "poll-tax riots and uprisings at Broadwater Farm Estate are coeval with the burning of Newgate Prison: they are virtual-reality panoramas from the Museum of London...Subversion may excite for a moment, but it will be crushed."
