= The Clerkenwell Tales =

Book by Peter Ackroyd

- First edition
- Author: Peter Ackroyd
- Language: English
- Publisher: Chatto & Windus
- Publication date: 2003
- Publication place: United Kingdom
- Media type: Print (hardback & paperback)
- Pages: 213 pp
- ISBN: 1856197069
- Preceded by: Dickens: Public Life and Private Passion
- Followed by: The Lambs of London

The Clerkenwell Tales is a historical novel by English writer Peter Ackroyd, first published in 2003.

The novel is set in the late 1390s. It focuses on the Lollardy and on a conspiracy against Richard II of England.

== Plot summary ==
The novel is set in London in the year 1399, a year of revolt, revolution and religious conspiracy. As Henry Bolingbroke challenges Richard II for the throne of England, the reader's attention is focused on Dominus, a secret society of religious fundamentalists, known to history as Lollards. The story is oriented similar to Geoffrey Chaucer's The Canterbury Tales and makes use of some of the characters from The Canterbury Tales as well. It turns on the conspiracies of a religious sect, led by the mad nun and making use of the prophecies of the mad Clerkenwell nun to foment panic and hysteria to bring forth the dethroning of Richard II. The result is a gothic novel which effortlessly merges fact and fiction into an almost recognizable alternate history.
