= The Last Testament of Oscar Wilde =

1983 novel by Peter Ackroyd

- First edition cover
- Author: Peter Ackroyd
- Language: English
- Publisher: Hamish Hamilton
- Publication date: April 1983
- Publication place: United Kingdom
- Media type: Print (Hardback & Paperback)
- ISBN: 978-0-241-10964-9

The Last Testament of Oscar Wilde is a 1983 novel by Peter Ackroyd. It takes the form of a fictional diary written by Oscar Wilde. Ackroyd's second novel, it won the 1984 Somerset Maugham Award for authors under the age of 35.

== Plot summary ==
The novel is written in the form of a diary which Oscar Wilde was writing in Paris in 1900, up to his death. The diary itself is completely fictional, as is the detail contained, although the events and most of the characters (such as the characters of Lord Alfred Douglas, Robert Ross and the Earl of Rosebery and his incarceration, at Pentonville, later Reading) are real. In this diary he looks back at his life, writing, and ruin through trial and gaol. Included are fairy tales much like those Wilde wrote, although again these are wholly Ackroyd's invention. The last pages are written in the character of Maurice, Wilde's valet.

== Reception and analysis ==
In 1984, the novel won the Somerset Maugham Award for authors under the age of 35. The Glasgow Herald, which called it "brilliant and moving", singled it out as a novel missing from the Booker Prize shortlist.

In 2005, looking back at Ackroyd's career to date, The Guardian noted that the novel displays "a gift for literary ventriloquism that would become something of a signature style" In 2019, S.J. Parris described Ackroyd as the master of writing "convincingly in the language of the past without going full hey-nonny-nonny" and this novel as a pitch-perfect imitation of period dialogue.

It has been the subject of a number of critical works, focussing on it as an example of postmodernism and as an example of fictional biography, especially fictional biographies of Wilde. Martin Middeke finds that the work functions as a novel "that masterly performs all elements of postmodern fiction", as a detailed, carefully researched account of Wilde's life, and as "a pastiche of the highest quality, a brilliant stylistic imitation of Wilde's witty, paradoxical and ironic style". Laura Savu notes "the heterogeneity and complexity of his writing, which justifies labels as diverse as postmodern, neo-Gothic, metaphysical-detective, and historiographic metafictional".
