= Dickens (TV series) =

- Genre: Docudrama
- Written by: Peter Ackroyd
- Directed by: Chris Granlund; Mary Downes
- Presented by: Peter Ackroyd
- Starring: Anton Lesser; Natasha Little; Avril Ellis
- Composer: Andrew Blaney
- Country of origin: United Kingdom
- Original language: English
- No. of series: 1
- No. of episodes: 3

Production
- Executive producer: Andrea Miller
- Producers: Chris Granlund; Mary Downes
- Editors: Colin Minchin; Michael Duly
- Running time: 60 minutes

Original release
- Network: BBC Two
- Release: 11 May – 25 May 2002

Dickens (renamed Uncovering the Real Dickens upon its DVD release) was a 2002 BBC docudrama on the life of the author Charles Dickens. It was presented by Peter Ackroyd, on whose biography of Dickens it was based, and Dickens was played by Anton Lesser. It was broadcast in three hour-long episodes.
