= Memphis Wood =

American artist

- Born: 1902; Dacula, Georgia, US
- Died: June 29, 1989 (aged 86–87); Atlanta, Georgia
- Known for: Visual arts: painting, sculpture, crafts, stitchery, fiber art

Memphis Wood (1902-1989) was an American artist who worked in various media over the course of her career. She worked in drawing, painting, sculpture, ceramics, pottery, and jewelry design, but she is probably best known for her unusual large-scale abstract fiber art, especially her textile wall-hangings. She was one of the first art educators in the Jacksonville, Florida school system, and taught art at Landon Junior-Senior High School in the city for 33 years until she retired in 1962. She helped establish the Jacksonville Art Museum and the Crown Craftsmen Association, a regional arts organization.

== Early life and education (1902–1922) ==
Memphis Wood was born in Dacula, a small town in north Georgia, and was a senior in high school before she saw an oil painting, an experience that ignited her interest in art. She took art lessons, and talked her older sister into payng the fifty cents a week fee. Following her mother's death. Wood attended the State Normal School for Women, a teacher's college in Athens, where she took an art history course. According to the art reviewer Wayne Hamm, she did not train as an artist or as an art teacher. At the time all teachers were required to teach an art course. She found a temporary job in Andrews, South Carolina; there she and the other teachers worked out an arrangement allowing her to teach all the art courses while they assumed responsibility for teaching her academic classes. She heard there were two openings for a permanent teaching job, one of them In Jacksonville, so she came to the city and took the job. She attended the University of Georgia during summer vacations, and in 1933, she was awarded a Bachelor's of Science degree in education. She returned later and earned her Master of Fine Arts degree in 1947.

== Career ==
According to the Mandarin Museum, when Wood moved to Jacksonville in 1929, she initially moved into a San Marco garage apartment. In the 1950s she built a home on Woodside Lane in Mandarin, which allowed her the space she needed to create her larger works, and a place to store them. There she formed a lifelong friendship with her neighbor, the artist Charlie Brown, who became a well-known potter in his own right. They built an enduring network of creative people who were the nucleus of Jacksonville’s growing art scene in the 1950s through the 1970s. Wood lived in that home, which she helped build herself, until just a few years before her death in Atlanta in 1989.

In a 1970 feature article, Cynthia Parks dubbed Wood "Jacksonville's first lady of art" and described her approach to teaching art, writing that she developed a broad taste, kept up-to-date on current art, and tried her hand in numerous media, believing that these things were essential to "keep students from being bored to death. Not all of them could draw or paint, nor should they, so we tried weaving, jewelry making, casting, pottery, assemblage... ". Wood expressed her view on the creation of art with the words, "I am not interested in 'messages.' I leave that to others. I am interested only in the visual aspects, in showing joyousness. I want my work to lift me out of myself".

On a trip to New York, Wood saw a hand-stitched hanging by Mariska Karasz, a fashion designer and textile artist, that inspired her. When she got home, she bought a piece of linen cloth, and, stretching it out on a bed, filled in the spaces with loops and colored stitches of yarn and string. She later met Karasz in Miami, and eventually Karasz visited Wood in Jacksonville. During the course of her tenure at Landon High School, Russell Hicken, director of the Jacksonville Art Museum at the time, asked Wood to show her wall hangings—it took her a year to create enough of them for an exhibition. After that showing, she gave up painting.

Upon retiring from the school system, she taught full time at Jacksonville University for five years and worked there part time even longer. She taught classes at the Children's Museum (most recently known as the Jacksonville Museum of Arts and Sciences (MOSH), and also taught classes at the Jacksonville Art Museum (now the Museum of Contemporary Art Jacksonville). In 1980, during an interview by the art historian Mary Campbell, Wood said, "I always had a great appreciation for fabrics. My old maid aunts made the most beautiful quilts and hand-stitched dresses."

In time she gained public recognition for her own stitchery. According to Wayne Hamm, Wood committed herself to fabric and stitchery through her membership in the Crown Craftsmen Association. To join the Craftsmen Gallery, she had to create pieces. Then Russell Hickens asked her to do a show for the Jacksonville Art Museum, and she gave up painting for good. Wood said she wanted "to make things that delight the vision". Her work features colors arranged in large, uncomplicated sections filled with the contrasting textures of yarns, felt, and velvet. Saying that she loved "bright, exciting colors", Wood credited a course in color taught by R. Roy, an extension teacher from Tallahassee, with teaching her how to group related colors in a composition.

== Reception ==
The Times-Union art reviewer Wayne Hamm took up Cynthia Park's earlier sobriquet for the artist, calling Memphis Wood "Jacksonville's first lady of art, who has taught or influenced almost every native regional artist." Elizabeth "Peggy" Friedmann, the co-editor of "Kalliope", a Jacksonville-based international women's literary magazine, took a course in stitchery from Wood and described the artist as "... a noble presence, a genius with color and texture... ". In 1984, Friedmann conducted an interview that was released as a short film titled "An Interview with Memphis Wood" produced by Florida State College of Jacksonville. Sally Ann Freeman, a fine art consultant and former owner of the Gallery Contemporanea in Jacksonville, said, "She has probably done more to communicate what art is all about to the citizens of Jacksonville than any other single artist." The writer Cynthia Parks quotes Russell Hicken, the director of the Jacksonville Art Museum, as saying that Wood's "most astounding contribution to the arts and crafts of Jacksonville is her own life."

== Works ==
Many of Wood's works are held in museums and in university, church, corporate, and private collections. According to the author Tim Gilmore, Wood's most famous artwork is a 22-foot tall tapestry mounted behind the pulpit in the Unitarian Universalist Church of Jacksonville (1967), designed by the architect Robert Broward. Gilmore writes that "the tapestry stands like a tree-of-life in lieu of crucifixion." He says there was a resurgence of interest in Wood's work when the Museum of Contemporary Art Jacksonville (MOCA) deaccessioned its Memphis Wood collection. Because the artist had lived for several decades in Mandarin, the comparatively small Mandarin Museum accepted the collection as a gift from MOCA in 2022. The museum says it is now considered to hold the largest known institutional Memphis Wood collection, having acquired more than 40 of her works. In 2024, the museum exhibited "Memphis Wood Revisited", curated by the art historian Elizabeth Heuer and the artist Nofa Dixon, a younger contemporary of Memphis Wood and her friend as well. The exhibit featured Memphis Wood works from Mandarin Museum's permanent collection, the UNF Special Collections, and select pieces loaned by local collectors of her work, including John Bunker and Vina Schemer.

The Thomas G. Carpenter Library Special Collections at the University of North Florida hold three of her sculptural fiber art pieces, and several of her other works. Before she died in 1989, Wood exhibited her work in North Carolina, Atlanta, and New York. She kept some of her sculptures at home, among them a pair of 7-foot-tall totems standing on wooden bases with shafts about 10 inches in diameter. One is wrapped in Naugahyde and has a feather top—the other is wrapped with yarn alternating with bands of fur, topped with colorful stuffed fabric tentacles like those of an anemone, as described by Mary Campbell.

== Education ==
(per Artists of Old Florida)

- Normal School for Women, Athens, Georgia
- University of Georgia, BS in education, 1933, MFA, 1947
- University of Florida, with Roy Craven, John Kacere
- with Howard Thomas
- Lamar Dodd
- Atlanta Art Institute, with Ben Shute
- Jacksonville Art Museum with William Parker
- Howard Thomas
- Sculpture with Ralph Hurst, Fred Holchum
- University of Florida extension art course, 1955

== Membership ==
(per Artists of Old Florida)

- Arts Exhibition Club of Jacksonville, name later changed to Jacksonville Arts Club
- Florida Federation of Art
- Jacksonville Art Museum
- Florida Artist Group
- Florida Art Teachers Association

== Exhibits ==
(per Artists of Old Florida)

- Arts Exhibition Club of Jacksonville, Packard building, Riverside Drive, October 1946, best oil in show, Party Dress, oils, Samantha, Under the Shadow of the Almighty, watercolors, Jessie's Transfer, Coal Car, Decks
- Arts Exhibition Club, 1946, 1st prize, oil, Party Dress, 1st and 3rd prizes, landscapes
- Jacksonville Arts Club Annual, May 1947, landscape watercolor, 1st prize, It Doesn't Look Real, 2nd prize, Old Trees, 2nd prize, oil still life
- Jacksonville Arts Club, Fall Exhibition, November 1947, at American School of Art, East Adams Street, oils, The Young Chemists, The Nativity
- Jacksonville Arts Club, Spring Exhibition, May–June 1948, at Children's Museum, Riverside Avenue, honorable mention, Autumn Leaves
- Southeastern Annual at High Museum of Art, as a Georgia artist, October 1949
- Florida Federation of Art, annual meeting, Gainesville, November 29 to December 1, Chamber of Commerce award, Wharves
- Florida Federation of Art, Annual Circuit, February 1951 at Art Club of St. Petersburg, Wharves
- Gainesville Association of Fine Arts, April 1952
- Audubon Artists Group, New York City, 1952
- Southeastern Annual, Atlanta 1952-53
- Terry Art Institute, national art scholarship contest for 1952 high school students, awarded to her student, Marjorie S. Jones of Jacksonville, out of 79,418 entrants, with $500 to Memphis Wood
- Florida Federation of Art Annual, November 1954, Jacksonville, Palm Beach Art League Award
- Ringling Museum of Art, 1955, Fifty Florida Painters, oil, Girl Carrying Christmas Packages
- Florida Federation of Art, Stetson University, DeLand, January 1955
- Jacksonville Art Museum, joint exhibit with Charles Brown, February 1955
- St. Augustine Art Association, March 1956, judge
- Florida Federation of Art Annual, Jacksonville Art Museum, 1956, award, Woman with Bird
- Florida Artists Group at Norton Gallery of Art, May 1958
- Florida Artist Group, 9th Annual Circuited Exhibition, 1958-1959, an oil, Spring Green
- Florida State Fair, Tampa, exhibited between, 1956-1962
- Florida Craftsmen Exhibition, 1963, award
- Mint Museum of Art, Charlotte, North Carolina, 1964, 2nd award
- Webb Gallery, Winter Park, January 1966, Voices of the Night, Composition in Beige, Green Old Lions, Big Blue, The Earth, Lunar Focus, Woman, Big Red, The Past is Present, Earth Sea and Sky
- Contemporary Art Gallery, St. Petersburg, May 1970, one woman exhibit of "complex, cohesive wall hangings"
- Jacksonville Art Museum
- University of Florida
- University of South Florida
- Tampa University
- Jacksonville Art Festival for seven years
- New York World's Fair
