= Chatterton (novel) =

1987 novel by Peter Ackroyd

Chatterton is a novel by Peter Ackroyd published on 1 January 1987 by Hamish Hamilton. It was shortlisted for the Booker Prize. It was commercially successful at the time of its publication. The novel is an investigation of the death of Thomas Chatterton. Chatterton had poisoned himself with arsenic when he was seventeen because of his poverty.

== Plot summary ==
The novel takes place in modern-day London. Charles Wychwood, a young poet, who is struggling to meet his ends finds a portrait of Chatterton at an older age than he was when he died. Charles is intrigued and begins his search by going to Bristol, where Chatterton was born. There he comes across a manuscript which suggests his death might just have been a ruse while Chatterton continued to write under the names of different poets like Cowper, Grey and Blake. Harriet Scrope, a novelist who is afraid that the world might find out his acts of plagiarism in her novels, assigns Chatterton the task of writing her memoir. Meanwhile they try to decode the clues found within historical documents. As their research goes on, Chatterton's presence, perhaps in essence if not physically, persists. The past merges with the present, resulting in typical dramatic outcomes, and Chatterton's essence is revived in English literature once again.

== Analysis ==
The novel extensively employs intertextuality and flashbacks. By presenting the story of Chatterton in flashbacks, the novel mixes the sequence of events and therefore presents time as a flux rather than linear. Writing for The Guardian, Emma Tennant points out how the novel tries to "show that 16th century London, nearly all obscured though it may be, lives on in fact." The novel comments on the obsession of writers with historical figures so much so that they tend to present them in a completely different light. Brian Finney points this tendency of the novel out:

Ackroyd is evidently concerned to show from the start of his book that we all appropriate past for our own purposes and in our own ways. There is no such thing as an objective past, let alone a recoverable figure of Chatterton. Wordsworth and his fellow Romantics had constructed their legend around the recently dead poet, a legend which is itself subject to a sea change by a subsequent age. (p.250)

The novel takes liberties to mold historical events according to the events taking place in the life of Charles. It deals prominently with themes of forgery, deceit and historiographic invention as a metatextual commentary on the novel itself. David Lodge, reviewing the book in The New York Review of Books, finds it as a bold attempt: "his authority as a story-teller to decide the historically undecidable mystery of Chatterton's death." Thus, "Chatterton is not a novel on the life of Thomas Chatterton; rather, it is a novel on how to (re)write it."

Dennis Drabelle praises Ackroyd's style and concludes that "Peter Ackroyd's Chatterton is the genuine article, a contrivance of the highest order."
