= Hawksmoor (novel) =

1985 novel by Peter Ackroyd

- First edition cover
- Author: Peter Ackroyd
- Language: English
- Publisher: Hamish Hamilton (UK); Harper & Row (US)
- Publication date: September 1985
- Publication place: United Kingdom
- Media type: Print (Hardcover & Paperback)
- ISBN: 978-0-241-11664-7
- OCLC: 12500258

Hawksmoor is a 1985 novel by English writer Peter Ackroyd. It won Best Novel at the 1985 Whitbread Awards and the Guardian Fiction Prize. It tells the parallel stories of Nicholas Dyer, who builds seven churches in 18th-century London for which he needs human sacrifices, and Nicholas Hawksmoor, detective in the 1980s, who investigates murders committed in the same churches. Hawksmoor has been praised as Peter Ackroyd's best novel and an example of postmodernism.

== Story ==
In the early 18th century, architect Nicholas Dyer is progressing work on several churches in London's East End. He is, however, involved in Satanic practices (something inculcated in him as an orphan), a fact which he must keep secret from all his associates, including his supervisor Sir Christopher Wren. This is all the more challenging since he indulges in human sacrifice as part of the construction of the buildings. Dyer's simmering contempt for Wren is brought closest to the surface in discussions they have concerning rationalism versus Dyer's own carefully disguised brand of mysticism.

In the 20th century, DCS Nicholas Hawksmoor is called in to investigate a bizarre series of murders by strangulation that have occurred in and around the churches designed by Dyer. The murders are all the more mystifying since the murderer appeared to have left no identifying traces, not even fingerprints on the victims' necks.

However the area is stalked by mysterious shadows, and it becomes clear that not only the weight of the investigation, but unseen forces from the past come to bear on Hawksmoor in a powerful, destructive manner.

== Historical background ==
Peter Ackroyd stressed the fact that Hawksmoor is not a historical novel in the strict sense of the word: "I have employed many sources in the preparation of Hawksmoor, but this version of history is my own invention."

Nevertheless, Ackroyd uses historical characters, sites and occurrences in his book. Nicholas Dyer, the architect of the seven churches, is modelled on Nicholas Hawksmoor but doesn't share his death date (Dyer disappears in 1715, Hawksmoor died in 1736). As said in the novel, the Commission for Building Fifty New Churches, which had been established by an Act of Parliament in 1711, commissioned Hawksmoor to build six churches, all of which are dealt with in the novel:

- Christ Church, Spitalfields,
- St George's, Bloomsbury,
- St Mary Woolnoth,
- St George in the East,
- St Anne's Limehouse,
- St Alfege Church, Greenwich.

The only fictional church in the book is Little St Hugh, venerating the historical Little Saint Hugh of Lincoln.

Hawksmoor was indeed assistant of Sir Christopher Wren, who is shown in the novel, historically correct, as profoundly interested in science and an active member of the Royal Society. Wren studied anatomy through dissection and vivisection so that the dissection of a killed woman by Wren in the novel refers to actual actions by Wren but maybe not on human beings. It is not certain but possible that Christopher Wren visited Stonehenge. The third historical character in the novel is Sir John Vanbrugh.

Historical occurrences Ackroyd refers to are the Great Plague of London of 1665/1666 and the Great Fire of London of 1666. Bedlam was actually not only a lunatic asylum but also an attraction for paying guests in the 18th century. For a penny visitors could look into the patients' cells, view the freaks of the "show of Bethlehem" and laugh at their antics. In 1814 alone, there were 96,000 such visits.

== Themes ==
Much of the novel is concerned with the disconnection between the 20th-century London of DCS Hawksmoor and its past, with Dyer's churches being both banal and mysterious to Hawksmoor. Wren's rationalism has succeeded in Hawksmoor's world, but we see Dyer's mysticism reassert itself in the form of murder and mystery. One critic has argued that Dyer's churches come to stand for the persistence of popular history and culture, in opposition to Wren's devotion to a rational progress driven by power and money.

=== Occultism ===
Nicholas Dyer believes in a syncretistic religion based on an utterly pessimistic view of man and world, represented by London: "In keeping with his Biblical belief that 'it was Cain who built the first City', Dyer leads us through the 'monstrous Pile of London' – 'Nest of Death and Contagion', 'Capital City of the World of Affliction', 'Hive of Noise and Ignorance'."

Mirabilis, Nicholas Dyer's spiritual teacher, is the leader of an underground sect known as "Enthusiasticks". Mirabilis preaches that "Christ was the Serpent who deceiv'd Eve, and in the form of a Serpent entered the Virgin's womb" and that "Sathan is the God of this World and fit to be worshipp'd." Among the sources he merges for his religion are the Ammonites, the Carthaginians, "the Straw Man of our Druides," the Syrian Beel-Zebub, the Assyrians, the Jews, the Cabbala, Joseph of Arimathea, the Cathedral of Bath, the Temple of Moloch, Westminster and Anubis. The sect "sacrificed Boys since it was their Opinion that Humane life, either in desperate sicknesse or in danger of Warre, could not be secured unless a vyrgyn Boy suffered in stead." A four-liner expresses the syncretist nature of Mirabilis's sect:

Pluto, Jehova, Satan, Dagon, Love,

Moloch, the Virgin, Thetis, Devil, Jove,
Pan, Jahweh, Vulcan, he with th'awfull Rod,

Jesus, the wondrous Straw Man, all one God."

Dyer develops his own belief in a reference between the pattern his churches form and the realm of evil and otherworldly. The pattern of his churches mirrors the "Proportion of the Seven Orders", i.e., Dyer literally tries to reproduce the pattern of the seven fixed stars that control the planetary spheres, thus hoping to submit to his will the seven planetary demons who control them. The exotic names Ackroyd gives to these demons bring to mind the seven maskim of Babylonian occultism. Due to the principles of sympathetic magic, Dyer reproduces with his churches the pattern of the seven planetary orders, and ensures that the pattern will be effective by concentrating within the septilateral figure the same kind of evil powers the seven fixed stars cast. "In other words, Dyer devises his churches as a huge talisman. This is why he builds them near ancient cemeteries and buries a sacrificial victim under their foundations, for, in his words: "when there are many Persons dead, only being buryed and laid in the Earth, there is an Assembling of Powers"."

Dyer believes that the ancients had an understanding of the "laws of harmonious proportions" used by the Universal Architect in the creation of the cosmos. Therefore, he studies ancient treatises on architecture. He builds his seven churches according to these principles and arranges them in a pattern imitating the Pleiades. In the end he disappears in his last church, like Hermes Trismegistus in his pyramid to begin his transmigration from body to body. Dyer undergoes a series of reincarnations both as victim and as murderer: each time he is reborn as a child or tramp, the new reincarnation is subsequently murdered by his "shadow" or dark emanation. In his last, 20th-century reincarnation, Dyer's evil emanation is embodied by the tramp called "The Architect", his good or rational side, by Nicholas Hawksmoor. The text expresses their final unification in the last paragraph of the novel when only one person speaks: What is said is separated by a wide blank on the page, indicating change of narrative level. The duality expressed in the change of narrative voices in the successive chapters is overcome by a first-person narration by somebody who is neither "The Architect" nor Hawksmoor.

=== Enlightenment vs. occultism ===
Central to Hawksmoor is an ongoing debate between those who believe in enlightenment and rationalism and those who believe in occultism. The main protagonists of both sides are Sir Christopher Wren and Nicholas Dyer. "While Dyer argues that man cannot avoid the rage of evil spirits except by participating in evil, Wren and his fellow members of the Royal Society argue that man's reason will one day vanquish 'those wilde inhabitants of False worlds'. Dyer's is the voice of the most despairing (and exulting) anti-intellectualism, a throwback to medieval notions of the necessary primacy of the irrational; Wren's is the civilized voice in which we should like to believe." Detective Hawksmoor begins as a member of the rationalist movement before resembling more and more Nicholas Dyer.

=== The nature of time ===
Hawksmoor transports an idea of time that is detrimental to the idea of time as a linearly progressing direction in time. "Ackroyd's aim is [...] to expose the linear character of time [...] for the fabrication that it is, and to propel his readers into a zone of full temporal simultaneity." This is achieved by parallelling numerous events happening in 18th-century and 1980s London thus indicating that Dyer and Hawksmoor experience more than only their own time. A symbol for this idea of a simultaneity of different layers of time is the uroborus:

Truly Time is a vast Denful of Horrour, round about which a Serpent winds and in the winding bites itself by the Tail. Now, now is the Flour, every Hour, every part of an Flour, every Moment, which in its end does begin again and never ceases to end: a beginning continuing, always ending.

This feature of Ackroyd's novel has been seen in scholarly research as distinctively postmodern: "One of the features of postmodern novels is to organise narrative time in non-linear fashion and to present the story line as fragmented and disrupted." This problematises reality by questioning scientific laws that governing time as well as social and cultural ideas of time that help to construct the western concept of reality. "There are no rational explanations for the time slips that occur between the eighteenth and twentieth centuries and, in some respects, the novel is a problematisation of that rational thinking that seeks causality and linearity." The reader has to accept Ackroyd's treatment of time in order to understand the novel.

Ackroyd himself called his concept of time in Hawksmoor "the perpetual present of the past" which "reemerges in the most unlikely ways."

== Literary and philosophical influences ==
=== Iain Sinclair's Lud Heat ===
Peter Ackroyd himself declared in the Acknowledgements that the stimulus for Hawksmoor was Iain Sinclair's poem Lud Heat: "I would like to express my obligation to Iain Sinclair's poem, Lud Heat, which first directed my attention to the stranger characteristics of the London churches." Lud Heat (1975) is subtitled "a book of the dead hamlets". In Book One, "The Muck Rake", Sinclair devotes the first section to "Nicholas Hawksmoor, His Churches".

Sinclair's thesis is that Hawksmoor planned his churches according to a strict "geometry of oppositions" producing a "system of energies, or unit of connection, within the city," similar to those formed by "the old hospitals, the Inns of Courts, the markets, the prisons, the religious houses and the others". Sinclair argues that Hawksmoor arranged Christ Church, St George's in-the-East, and St Anne's, Limehouse, to form a triangle, while St George's, Bloomsbury, and St Alfege's, Greenwich, make up a pentacle star.

Ackroyd did not follow Sinclair in really thinking that the churches form a distinctive and powerful pattern. Asked if the churches form a "symbol of freemasonry", he answered: "They don't really form a pattern. I made the pattern up."

=== Psychogeography ===
Coined by the French Situationist Guy Debord, psychogeography originally referred to practices intended to expose the "urban geography falsified by the commercial and consumerist imperatives of late capitalism". Debord undertook what he called dérives (literally 'drifts' across the city) that showed the various layers of place (historical, psychic, physical). For Ackroyd the 'dérive' is more like a "circumambulation through time as well as place: a widening gyre that exposes the very timelessness of this two-millennia-old city." The motif of the wanderer in the novel (tramps, vagrants, the restless wanderers Nicholas Dyer and Nicholas Hawksmoor) shows the influence of the psychogeographical theory in Hawksmoor.

=== William Blake and T. S. Eliot ===
Scholars have argued that the influences of William Blake and T. S. Eliot, both of whom are the subjects of Ackroyd biographies, are detectable in Hawksmoor. "The suggestion that Dyer was "more charmed by Milton's Hell than by his Paradise" and Hawksmoor's perception of his work as "that of rubbing away the grease and detritus which obscured the real picture of the world" echo passages in Blake's The Marriage of Heaven and Hell (35, 39)."

"Dyer's obsession with physical corruption—in particular his disgust with sex—echoes the dysphoria of Eliot's most characteristic poems; his evocation of London as the Capital City of the World of Affliction and his scorn for the optimism of the Enlightenment strike an unmistakably Eliotic tone. Women are sluts and prostitutes. There is even a passing reference to hollow men. Clearly Mr. Ackroyd shares Eliot's high regard for the language of the Renaissance and for Elizabethan and Jacobean drama."

"The basic principle at work here derives directly from Eliot's The Waste Land, a poem that juxtaposes the past with the present to show the continuity of history. [...] Those who are infected with the Black Death are called "Hollow Men", after the famous poem by Eliot. [...] Dyer's reflection on the quandaries of temporality virtually paraphrases a famous passage from Eliot's Four Quartets (1942) [...]: "What we call the beginning is often the end / And to make an end is to make an beginning."

== Structure and narrative mode, style, symbolism ==
=== Structure and narrative mode ===
Hawksmoor is divided into a prologue and two untitled parts of six untitled chapters each. The odd-numbered chapters are first-person narrations by Nicholas Dyer in 18th-century London, while the even-numbered chapters take place in the 1980s and are told by an omniscient narrator, from the perspective of a tour guide through London and the murder victim Thomas Hill (chapter 2), the murder victim Ned (chapter 4) and Nicholas Hawksmoor (chapters 6, 8, 10 and 12).

This clear pattern is deliberately obscured by a "pattern of echo and repetition". There are numerous parallels in characters, actions and descriptions between the chapters taking place in the 18th and those taking place in the 20th century. "They escape any effort at organization and create a mental fusion between past and present." For example, the same fragments of popular songs, ballads, and poems are heard in the streets of London in both historical periods.

This structure of repetitions and references underlines the peculiar theory of time the novel transports: "As we go on reading, we find more and more [...] reduplications of names, events, actions, and even identical sentences uttered by characters who live two centuries apart, until we are forced to conclude that, in the novel, nothing progresses in time, that the same events repeat themselves endlessly, and that the same people live and die only in order to be born and to live the same events again and again, eternally caught in what appears to be the ever-revolving wheel of life and death. This interchangeability of characters and the circularity of events is stressed by the device of using the same words to end and to begin adjacent chapters.

=== Style ===
One of the most characteristic attributes of Hawskmoor is the first-person narration by Nicholas Dyer. Ackroyd here imitates unofficial 18th-century English (characterized by capitalization, Frenchified suffixes, irregular orthography) as can be found in Samuel Pepys's diary.

Ackroyd read 18th-century texts for half a year in the British Library. "texts about how to cure the gout, by a surgeon. Necromantic texts. I didn’t mind what it was as long as it was the right period." The most important source was Samuel Johnson’s Dictionary: "Whenever I had to write a sentence about, say, someone looking out of the window, then I’d look up ‘window’ in Johnson, and there’d be all sorts of definitions, and phrases with the word in it, and these I also co-opted for the book".

=== Symbolism ===
==== Shadow ====
The word "shadow" symbolizes not only Dyer's occult belief system but literally his dark side himself since he appears later on in the novel as a shadow killing people. Dyer admonishes his assistant Walter: "the art of shaddowes you must know well, Walter" because "it is only the Darknesse that can give trew Forme to our Work". The name Dyer gives his occultism is "Scientia Umbrarum" (shadowy knowledge) The murder victims all fall prey to an ominous figure called "the shadow".

==== Stone ====
As symbol for the concept of eternity and overcome transitoriness Ackroyd chose the stone. Dyer becomes an architect after Mirabilis, his Satanic sect leader, prophesied to him: "You will build, he replied, and turn this Paper-work house (by which he meant the Meeting-place) into a Monument: let Stone be your God and you will find God in the Stone."

For Dyer the monument of Stonehenge is an ancient place of occult powers, of a deep connection with a dark past because of its stones: "The true God is to be venerated in obscure and fearful Places, with Horror in their Approaches, and thus did our Ancestors worship the Daemon in the form of great Stones."

The stones contain for ever the pain of the workers who erected them, Dyer can feel this and more since human concepts and suffering has eternalized in the stones: "And when I lean'd my Back against that Stone I felt in the Fabrick the Labour and Agonie of those who erected it, the power of Him who enthrall'd them, and the marks of Eternity which had been placed there."

==== Animals ====
One of Satan's names, Beelzebub, can be translated as "Lord of the Flies". Thus flies and other insects (spiders, lice) are recurrently used as symbols in Hawksmoor. Already at the very beginning of the novel Dyer advises his assistant Walter to "show how the Lines [of the church plans] necessarily beare upon one another, like the Web which the Spider spins in a Closet", thus associating the churches with an insect. Dyer's pessimistic view of the world is stressed by his view of it as a "dunghill" attracting flies: "I saw the Flies on this Dunghil Earth, and then considered who their Lord might be." Ironically the occultist Dyer compares the rationalistic members of the Royal Society with flies: "The Company buzzed like Flies above Ordure".

Another animal often associated with Satan and evil is the black cat. Thus a black cat is often heard or seen near the places where the tramp called "The Architect" makes his appearance. It is also associated with Mirabilis and his Satanic sect ("I fell into a sound Sleep, before I did so, I seemed to hear screeching, much like that of a Catte.") It is a cat which leads Thomas Hill to the church where he gets strangled.

== Role as postmodern novel ==
Critics and scholars have identified Hawksmoor as a postmodern novel. Ackroyd uses typical postmodern techniques, such as playfulness, intertextuality, pastiche, metafiction and temporal distortion.

Peter Ackroyd himself does not see Hawksmoor as an expressly postmodern novel but prefers the term "transitional writing":

I have never used the terms modernism or postmodernism because they mean very little to me as such, but in terms of historical consciousness history seems to be growing all the time. I don’t want to speak personally, but when I wrote a book called Hawksmoor, in 1986, it was considered rather a joke to write a novel set both in the past and in the present. It was considered a conceit. But over the last twenty years there have been any number of historical fictions with one foot in the past and one foot in the present. It’s become actually a genre of its own, and there are some novelists who are specialized in it completely. And in fact that transitional writing, if I can put it that way, between past and present, has also slipped into non-fiction, and some historical narratives and biographical narratives now make use of this device, confronting or transposing past and present."

Ackroyd plays with the genre of the detective story by using the form of the detective novel but changing the premises in such a way that the typical course of events (crime–logical investigation–solution) is impossible. "Suffice it to say that in a detective story whose strange outcome is reincarnation, fiction and history fuse so thoroughly that an abolition of time, space, and person is, one might say, inflicted on the reader." Thus Hawksmoor can be called an anti-detective novel:

His novels are in the first place a sort of hybrid genre, using the detective convention to a large extent, but then turning even the most obviously detective of his fictions, Hawksmoor, into an antidetective novel. Ackroyd borrows just the basic convention of the genre, mainly the investigation of details, and gradually subverts this very convention in order to construct a postmodern universe of confusion, indeterminacy and ambiguity but which can accommodate the more challenging investigation into the nature of truth or human identity."

== Reception and awards ==
Hawksmoor won two of the most prestigious British literary awards: the Guardian Fiction Prize and the Whitbread Novel Award. It was reviewed predominantly positively after publication. Joyce Carol Oates for The New York Times wrote:

Hawksmoor is a witty and macabre work of the imagination, intricately plotted, obsessive in its much-reiterated concerns with mankind's fallen nature. [...] (Half the novel—its most energetic half—is related by Dyer himself in the years 1711–1715. The other half belongs to Detective Hawksmoor, whose voice, like his imagination, is far less inspired.) By the end of the novel the reader is likely to concur with Dyer's conviction that there is "no Light without Darknesse and no Substance without Shaddowe," if simply because Dyer's voice is so skillfully done. [...] There are numerous set pieces here, all of them well done: a description of London under the siege of the plague; an autopsy performed by, of all persons, Christopher Wren; an evening at a London theater. Dyer's "romantic" churches at Spitalfields, Wapping, Limehouse, Greenwich, Lombard Street, Bloomsbury and Moorfields are poetically vivid, as is his encounter, as a boy, with a group of druid devil worshipers who convert him to their beliefs. [...] IF Hawksmoor is less than perfect as a mystery-suspense novel it is primarily because Detective Hawksmoor is no match for his mad 18th-century counterpart: he lacks Dyer's passion as well as his uncanny sensibility. [...] But in all, Hawksmoor is an unfailingly intelligent work of the imagination, a worthy counterpart in fiction to Mr. Ackroyd's much-acclaimed biography of Eliot.

Peter S. Prescott, in Newsweek, defined it "a fascinating hybrid, a tale of terrors that does double duty as a novel of ideas". Patrick McGrath for BOMB magazine, stated that "Hawksmoor is [Ackroyd's] best fiction to date. It is a dark, complex novel narrated in part in perfect 17th-century prose."

Dave Langford reviewed Hawksmoor for White Dwarf #99, and stated that "unforgettably black vision of crossed timelines and sinister compulsions built into London's religious architecture".

Although most reviews were positive there were voices which criticized Hawksmoor as confusing or morally repellent, particularly in sexual terms. (Hollinghurst, King, Maddox). While most critics especially praised Ackroyd's imitation of 18th-century English there were critical voices here, for example Cedric D. Reverand II, who wrote that "Ackroyd's notion of the appropriate style seems at times idiosyncratic and more Jacobean–Mannerist than late seventeenth–early eighteenth century".

Hawksmoor has become the subject of numerous studies, especially on postmodernism. Adriana Neagu and Sean Matthews wrote in 2002 that:

[it] is anything but the archetypal 'early' novel. This history-spanning dual narrative prefigures the writer's pet themes, 'history-mystery' and the expression of a dialectic relationship between past and present. Coming together by way of the most unlikely mixture of the comical and the macabre, the lofty and the sordid, the book offers two historical perspectives: the early eighteenth century of London architect Nicholas Dyer, and the present day city of detective Nicholas Hawksmoor. [...] Although told in alternating sequences, the two story lines collapse into each other and intertwine ambivalently, the novel offering a sample of the complex architectonic structure of Ackroyd's fictions."

Hawksmoor is praised for Ackroyd's "convincingly 18th-century prose" in the 2006 edition of The Cambridge Guide to Literature in English. It was chosen by Penguin in 2010 as one of five novels representing the 1980s in their series Penguin Decades.

Peter Ackroyd himself is a harsh critic of his novel:

I certainly haven’t looked at [Hawksmoor] again, I wouldn’t dare; I’m so aware of all the weaknesses in it, it’s an embarrassment. [...] The modern sections are weak, not in terms of language, but weak in terms of those old-fashioned characteristics of plot, action, character, story; they are rather sketches, or scenarios, and that rather disappoints me about it. But at the time I didn’t know anything about writing fiction, so I just went ahead and did it. It’s only recently I’ve come to realize you’re meant to have plots and stories and so on. [Nicholas Dyer’s voice is] strong, but in part it is a patchwork of other people’s voices as well as my own. Actually it’s not really strong at all [...] but what it is, is an echo from about three hundred different books as well as my own. He doesn’t really exist as a character—he’s just a little patchwork figure, like his author. [...] You see, I was very young then and I didn’t realize that people had to have definite characters when they appeared in fiction. I saw it as a sort of linguistic exercise; it never occurred to me that they had to have a life beyond words.

== Adaptation ==
The South Bank Show covered Hawksmoor in 1985. Extensive dramatisations from the novel alternated with an interview with the author by Melvyn Bragg. The broadcast was directed by David Thomas, the leading actors were Jack Shepherd as Nicholas Dyer, Derek Newark as Nicholas Hawksmoor, Mick Ford as Walter and Clive Swift as Sir Christopher Wren.

It was dramatised for BBC Radio 4 by Nick Fisher in 2000, with Philip Jackson playing the eponymous role, Norman Rodway as Sir Christopher Wren, Richard Johnson as Mirabilis and was produced by Janet Whitaker.

== Sources ==
- Facta Universitas, Series: Linguistics and Literature Vol 7, November 2008: Ana Sentov: "The Postmodern Perspective of Time in Peter Ackroyd's "Hawksmoor" (relying heavily on Paul Smethurst: "The Postmodern Chronotope" (2000))
- Alex Link: "'The Capitol of Darknesse': Gothic Spatialities in the London of Peter Ackroyd's Hawksmoor." Contemporary Literature. 45.3 (2004): 516-37.
- New York Times, January 19, 1986: Joyce Carol Oates: "The Highest Passion is Terrour"
- Susana Onega: "Metafiction and Myth in the Novels of Peter Ackroyd", Camden House 1999
- Ahearn, Edward J. (Winter 2000). "The Modern English Visionary: Peter Ackroyd's Hawksmoor and Angela Carter's The Passion of New Eve". Twentieth Century Literature. 46 (4). Archived from the original on 25 January 2005 – via FindArticles.
