= Skyliner (band) =

American heavy metal band

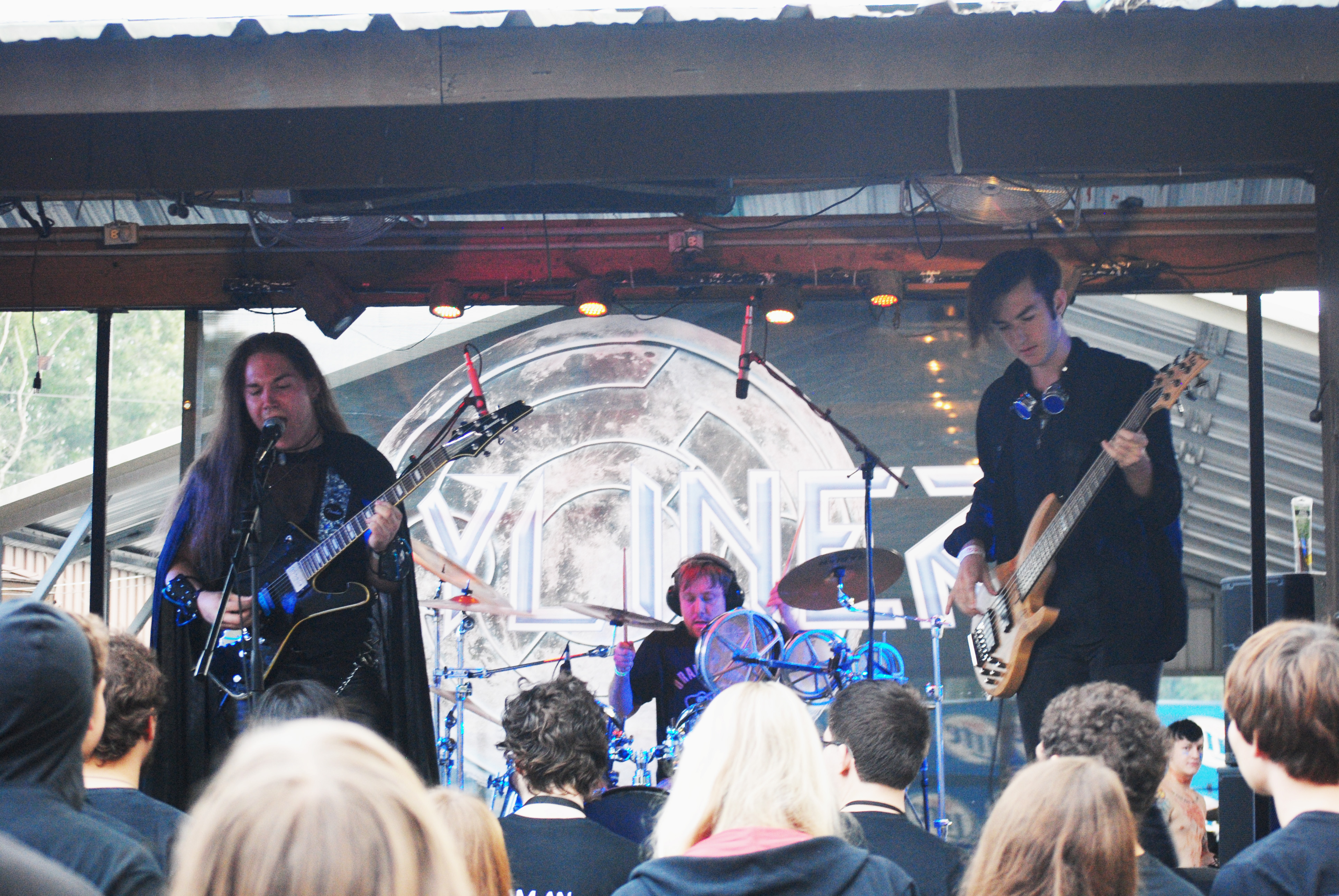
- Skyliner at the DeLand Rock & Metal Festival in 2014.

Background information
- Origin: Jacksonville, Florida
- Genres: Power metal, Progressive metal
- Years active: 2000–present
- Labels: Limb Music, Alchemic Visions
- Members: Jake Becker; Ben Brenner; Stuart Brinkman
- Website: http://skylinermusic.com/

Skyliner is an American heavy metal band hailing from Jacksonville, Florida. The band was formed in 2000 by guitarist and vocalist Jake Becker and drummer Benjamin Brenner. Since the band formed, they have released two demos, two EPs, and three full-length studio albums. The band was signed to an international recording contract with Limb Music, based in Hamburg, Germany. before going independent.

Skyliner's main genres are typically considered to be power metal and progressive metal. Turning away from the fantasy-based lyrics of typical power metal, Skyliner's themes have included personal pain, alienation, social awareness, and a variety of spiritual or esoteric concepts. Becker has an unusual composing style, typically writing the musical score around a finished set of lyrics.

In February, 2014, the band released their first studio album Outsiders, which contains nine tracks and is 70 minutes long. The album was released on the Limb Music record label and contained a mix of songs that appeared on earlier recordings as well as new material.

== History ==
=== Formation ===
Jake Becker and Ben Brenner met at a church youth group in 2000 at ages 14 and 15, respectively. The two were mutually interested in one another because neither quite fit in with the other members of the church. Both were new to their instruments and over the next couple years the two developed with each other, a relationship that would prove priceless as time progressed. Despite Becker's songwriting becoming significantly more focused, the two still had trouble finding talented and serious musicians who wanted to play their style of music, leading to a long roster of bassists and other members.

=== Early recordings ===
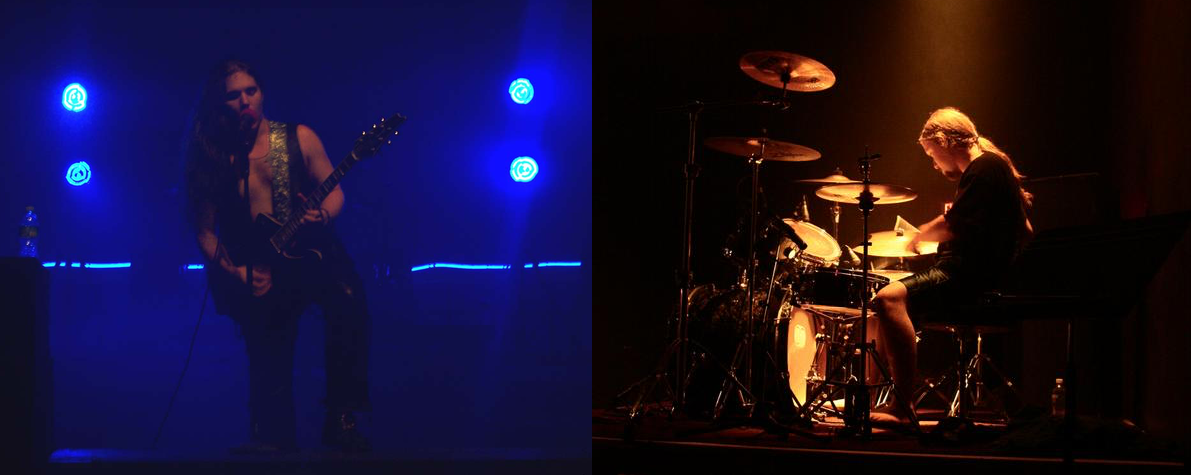
Jake Becker and Ben Brenner are the founding members of Skyliner.

In 2005, the band assembled the demo CD Light Comes Out of Black. All of the tracks were recorded live in the studio with the exception on Becker's vocals. Kyle Sweeney joined the band as the bassist for the recording of this demo, but left later on in 2004. This release opened the door for local shows and got the band some minor publicity in the area, but during the time the album was being promoted, Becker was already working on and correcting a new batch of songs.

Four years later, the self-titled demo Skyliner was released. Compared with the first, the new demo showed a more specific identity for the band, including the addition of a keyboard, played by Cody Lewis, as well as new artwork. Bassist David Lee Redding soon joined up, and would stay with the band until 2013. During this first decade of its existence, Skyliner struggled to maintain a permanent line-up and also had difficulties putting in enough time and money to keep the band moving forward at the rate desired. However, the releases provided many lessons to the band and allowed the core synergy between Becker and Brenner to grow even stronger.

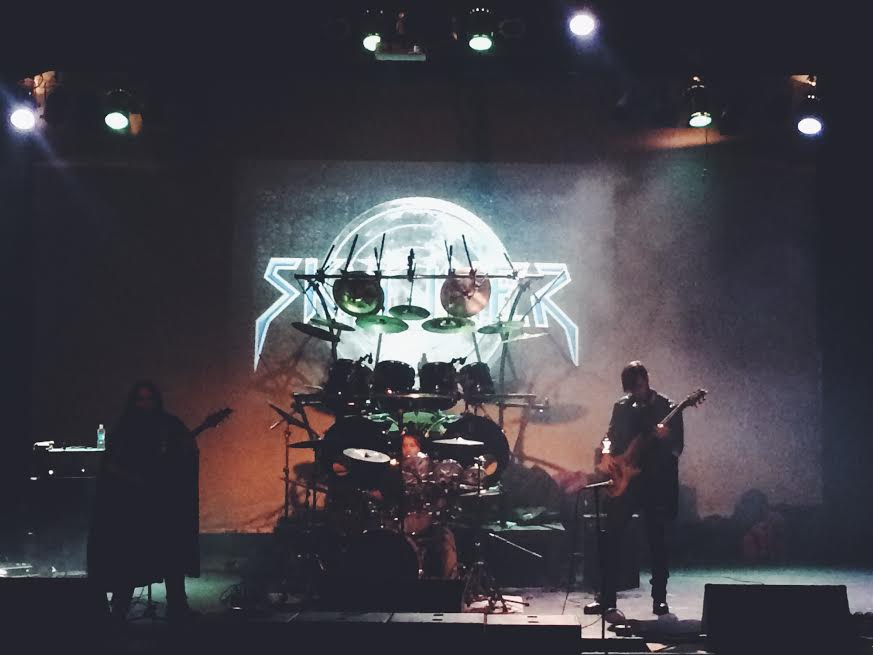
Skyliner at the Murray Hill Theatre in February 2015.

Setting aside the two demos' shortcomings, the band released the first EP The Alchemist in 2011. Joining with engineers Andrew Perlowich and Jamie King, the band sought to release songs that truly reflected their own style. Ashley Flynn replaced Cody Lewis on the keyboard, thus completing the line-up for the first studio album. While the songs do not differ greatly from the second demo in terms of style, the mistakes made during the recording and mastering were addressed while the demos were largely unaltered.

=== Limb Music ===
The band's first full-length studio album, Outsiders, was recorded in 2013. Skyliner maintained its recording line-up from the EP and again sought out Jamie King for mixing and mastering. The songs "Symphony in Black", "Undying Wings", "Aria of the Waters", and "The Alchemist" appeared in the band's previous releases and were revised to Becker's specifications before being recorded for the new album. Ideas originally in the songs "Time" and "Outsiders" from the 2005 demo Light Comes Out of Black also make a reappearance not as songs themselves, but movements in the 21-minute finale "Worlds of Conflict", a multi-part suite dealing with depersonalization-derealization disorder.

Just as the band was looking for a label with which to release Outsiders, Flynn and Redding both left the band. Shortly after their departure, Nathaniel Curtis became the band's new bassist. In autumn of 2013, Skyliner signed a contract with Limb Music. The album released worldwide on February 28, 2014, and celebrated the North American release on April 15. Described by Limb as "the symbiosis of classy, sophisticated song writing characteristic for the US and the traditional heavy metal values and virtues of Europe," the album was met with positive reviews despite its risk-taking progressive mindset. Support of the album grew while more online reviews and magazine articles were beginning to call Skyliner "one of the breakout progressive power metal bands of 2014."

Condition Black, the band's sophomore effort for LMP, was released on October 21, 2016, again mixed and mastered by Jamie King. This also marked the band's video debut with a clip filmed for the now-signature title track. Condition Black received similar accolades as the debut, but also some disconcert at the band's decision to remain a three-piece and expand upon a more raw, aggressive, and progressive style. The record included an ambitious 5-song-suite entitled "A Divine Triumvirate", which incorporated elements from Swedish death metal, atmospheric, free-flowing jazz, and Vedic-inspired chants and percussion. Becker would go on to remark that this section of the record may have found more success if released as its own independently-themed EP apart from the otherwise more traditional Condition Black.

Alchemic Visions

The band would follow through on that notion with the release of the followup Age of Virgo EP on May 26, 2018, mixed and mastered by Jamie King and distributed via their own imprint, Alchemic Visions and showcasing the debut of Stuart Brinkman on bass. Age of Virgo proved to be the most progressive outing yet, featuring a two-part title track made up of both the most atmospheric and heaviest music the band had created and described as "a dedication to the feminine power which helped give birth to a balanced civilization; a mostly instrumental musical narrative taking the listener through times of tranquility and thunder when goddesses took their place on Earth." The band appeared in a striking promotional photoshoot showing each member's face covered in blood, keeping in theme with the menstruation and afterbirth depicted on the cover art.

In 2019, recordings began for what would emerge as the third full-length album, Dark Rivers, White Thunder. Mixed and mastered by Jamie King and released as the second physical release through Alchemic Visions on January 30, 2021, Dark Rivers, White Thunder met with widespread praise critically and from fans. The album made a full return to the intense US/Euro sound of the band, while maintaining progressive elements and introducing some fresh ideas. On Dark Rivers, White Thunder, more tribal-associated instrumentation and rhythms were incorporated than ever before. Becker, by now known as Starseeker, attributed the new developments to the need to "go back, in a mental sense, a spiritual sense, go back to that old place we all began at, where a few humans were sitting around a fire, started banging on rocks and bones, and screamed out at the sky." The band's Facebook page also elaborated on the idea, revealing the parallels in the album's themes to the Jungian concept of "the two-million-year-old-self". A video clip was filmed for the song "I Walk Alone".

== Discography ==
- Light Comes Out of Black (Demo, 2005)
- Skyliner (Demo, 2009)
- The Alchemist (EP, 2011)
- Outsiders (LP, 2014)
- Condition Black (LP, 2016)
- The Age Of Virgo (EP, 2018)
- Dark Rivers, White Thunder (LP, 2021)

== Members ==
=== Present members ===
- Jake Becker - Vocals, Guitar
- Ben Brenner - Drums, percussion
- Stuart Brinkman - Bass, backing vocals

=== Former members ===
==== Bass ====
- Nathaniel Curtis (2013-2017)
- David Lee Redding (2007–2013)
- Code Cochran (Doc Moccasin)(2006–2007)
- Jake Alessandrini (2005–2006)
- Kyle Sweeney (2004)
- Donnie Back (2000–2001)

==== Keyboard ====
- Ashley Flynn (2010–2013)
- Cody Lewis (2007–2009)
