= English Music (novel) =

1992 book by Peter Ackroyd

First edition (publ. Hamish Hamilton)

English Music is the sixth novel by Peter Ackroyd. Published in 1992, it is both a bildungsroman and, in the words of critic John Barrell, "partly a series of rhapsodies and meditations on the nature of English culture, written in the styles of various great authors." As with all Ackroyd's previous novels, it focuses on London, although on this occasion partly as a backdrop for English culture in general.

== Plot summary ==
The plot is split between a continuous narrative and a series of self-contained stories, all related to the main tale.

=== Odd Numbered Chapters ===
The novel opens in the early 1920s, and is for the most part told in the first person of Timothy Harcombe, aged nine at the beginning of the narrative. Timothy lives with (and is home-educated by) his widowed father Clement, a faith healer whose performances at the Chemical Theatre, Hackney, involve Timothy as his assistant. Clement Harcombe instills a vivid sense of English culture in Timothy, principally through selected readings of classic works like Robinson Crusoe and Alice's Adventures in Wonderland. Timothy's life is suddenly turned upside-down by the arrival of his maternal grandfather, who takes Timothy away to live with him and his grandmother in Wiltshire. After an abortive attempt by several of Harcombe's acquaintances to reunite Timothy with his father, Timothy is returned to Wiltshire where he attends the local school and befriends a disabled boy, Edward Campion. It becomes evident that Timothy possesses skills akin to those performed onstage by his father, as he cures his grandmother of a debilitating nervous shake.

Time passes and Timothy does not hear from his father again during most of his schooldays. On leaving school he returns to London where he finds his father, recently separated from his girlfriend, Gloria Patterson. He is virtually destitute and making ends meet by carrying house-calls as a healer, with largely unsuccessful results. Finding his father's finances in chaos he decides to accompany him on his healing visits, and Harcombe's skill miraculously reappears. Timothy becomes briefly infatuated with Gloria, whom he encounters by chance, and whose callous, scheming attitude both repels and arouses him. He also discovers that his father had been pressured into sending him to Wiltshire by the educational authorities, whose concerns about Timothy's unorthodox schooling were exacerbated when they discovered that his father had been using him as part of a theatrical performance.

Becoming increasingly unsatisfied with his existence, Timothy decides he needs to move on and secures a job as an art gallery security guard, courtesy of another of his father's acquaintances from their theatre days, Stanley Clay. In the intervening period, he loses touch with his father again. Growing unsatisfied once more, he briefly entertains the idea of further education before deciding to return to his grandparents in Wiltshire. It is there that he discovers that his father is now a magician with a travelling circus, and his grandparents inform him that this had been Harcombe's job before Timothy was born. Once again father and son team up with spectacular results, and Harcombe manages to heal the disabled Edward, but at the cost of his own life. Timothy continues the circus act after his father's death, until he inherits his grandparents' cottage after they die. After he is drafted in the Second World War, Timothy continues living at the cottage until old age.

=== Even Numbered Chapters ===
Interspersed with Timothy's story are a series of dream sequences which occur to him either as he sleeps, falls unconscious or ill. Each story involves aspects of English culture, derivatively through stylistic imitation, direct quotation or as an original story. Some stories involve characters from literature or the real-life authors, artists and composers. All the short stories involve Timothy's character or a version of him, and are told in the third person.

2. Alice's Adventures in Wonderland, Through the Looking-Glass (Alice, The Red Queen, The White Rabbit, The Mad Hatter) The Pilgrim's Progress (Christian)
4. Great Expectations (Pip, Miss Havisham, Estella Havisham, Orlick), Charles Dickens
6. Sherlock Holmes
8. The Adventures of Robinson Crusoe, Gulliver's Travels, A Journal of the Plague Year
10. William Byrd
12. William Hogarth (The Rake's Progress, Beer Street and Gin Lane)
14. Paintings by Richard Wilson (Hounslow Heath), Thomas Gainsborough, John Constable, Joseph Wright of Derby, John Martin (Landscape with a Castle), J. M. W. Turner, Samuel Palmer, Ford Madox Brown, James McNeill Whistler (Nocturne: Blue and Gold – Old Battersea Bridge). The Canterbury Tales and the novels Pamela, or Virtue Rewarded (Pamela Andrews, Mr B), The Adventures of Peregrine Pickle (Jack Hatchway, Commodore Trunnion), Tristram Shandy, A Sentimental Journey (Parson Yorick), The Mill on the Floss, Wuthering Heights (Catherine Earnshaw).
16. A long poem in the style of William Blake, celebrating English poetry from Cædmon to Ernest Dowson.
18. Le Morte d'Arthur (Fisher King, Merlin). T.S. Eliot

== Critical response ==
Reaction to the novel was largely negative. Many critics found Ackroyd's nationalist tone narrow and conservative, in particular the suggestion that the variety of writers, composers and artists were serving a homogenous vision. Critics also noted that female writers and artists (brief allusions to the works of George Eliot and Emily Brontë aside) were largely absent.

Critics have noted a strong similarity between Ackroyd's perspective of English culture as a single narrative with T.S. Eliot's essay "Tradition and the Individual Talent", where Eliot argues that the classics of the Western canon form an "ideal order among themselves". Whilst Ackroyd's cultural view was seen to mirror that of Eliot, his postmodern handling of the material was identified as radically different. Others noticed a similarity between Ackroyd's structure and that employed by Virginia Woolf in Between the Acts.
