= Peter Ackroyd =

English author (born 1949)

Peter Ackroyd CBE FRSL
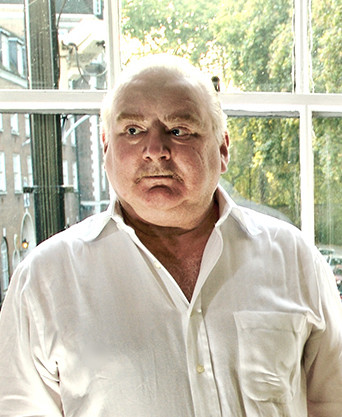
- Ackroyd in 2007
- Born: 5 October 1949 (age 76); East Acton, London, England, United Kingdom
- Education: Clare College, Cambridge (BA)
- Occupations: Novelist, biographer, critic
- Partner(s): Brian Kuhn (1980; died 1994)
- Writing career
- Period: 1976–present
- Genres: Biography; drama; essays; fiction; literary criticism; non-fiction; poetry; short stories
- Subjects: London and its inhabitants; English history and culture
- Peter Ackroyd's voice from the BBC programme Desert Island Discs, 20 May 2012.

Peter Ackroyd CBE, FRSL (born 5 October 1949) is an English novelist, biographer and critic with a specialist interest in the history and culture of London. He is noted for his "technically innovative novels", the volume of work he has produced, the range of styles therein, his skill at assuming different voices, and the depth of his research.

For his novels about English history and culture and his biographies of, among others, William Blake, Charles Dickens, T. S. Eliot, Charlie Chaplin and Sir Thomas More, Ackroyd won the Somerset Maugham Award and two Whitbread Awards.

He was elected a fellow of the Royal Society of Literature in 1984 and appointed a Commander of the Order of the British Empire in 2003.

== Early life and education ==
Ackroyd was born in London and brought up on a council estate in East Acton, in what he has described as a "strict" Roman Catholic household by his mother and grandmother, after his father disappeared from the family home. He first knew that he was gay when he was seven. He was educated at St Benedict's, Ealing, and at Clare College, Cambridge, from which he graduated with a double first in English literature. In 1972, he was a Mellon fellow at Yale University.

== Work ==
The result of his Yale fellowship was Notes for a New Culture, written when Ackroyd was only 22 and eventually published in 1976. The title, an echo of T. S. Eliot's Notes Towards the Definition of Culture (1948), was an early indication of Ackroyd's penchant for exploring and re-examining the works of other London-based writers. He worked at The Spectator magazine between 1973 and 1977 as literary editor and became joint managing editor in 1978, a position he held until 1982. He worked as chief book reviewer for The Times and was a frequent broadcaster on radio. Since 1984 he has been a fellow of the Royal Society of Literature.

His literary career began with poetry; his work in that field includes such works as London Lickpenny (1973) and The Diversions of Purley (1987). In 1982 he published The Great Fire of London, his first novel, which is a reworking of Charles Dickens' novel Little Dorrit. The novel set the stage for the long sequence of novels Ackroyd has produced since, all of which deal in some way with the complex interaction of time and space and what Ackroyd calls "the spirit of place". However, this transition to being a novelist was unexpected. The novel received generally positive reviews on its publication, although many reviewers have subsequently reassessed it in the light of Hawksmoor three years later, which had a similar focus albeit with a different historical perspective. In an interview with Patrick McGrath in 1989, Ackroyd said:

I enjoy it, I suppose, but I never thought I'd be a novelist. I never wanted to be a novelist. I can't bear fiction. I hate it. It's so untidy. When I was a young man I wanted to be a poet, then I wrote a critical book, and I don't think I even read a novel till I was about 26 or 27.

In his novels he often contrasts historical settings with present-day segments (e.g. The Great Fire of London, Hawksmoor, The House of Doctor Dee). Many of Ackroyd's novels are set in London and deal with the ever-changing, but at the same time stubbornly consistent nature of the city. Often this theme is explored through the city's artists, especially its writers: Oscar Wilde in The Last Testament of Oscar Wilde (1983), a fake autobiography of Wilde; Nicholas Hawksmoor, Sir Christopher Wren and Sir John Vanbrugh in Hawksmoor (1985); Thomas Chatterton and George Meredith in Chatterton (1987); John Dee in The House of Dr Dee (1993); Dan Leno, Karl Marx, George Gissing and Thomas De Quincey in Dan Leno and the Limehouse Golem (1994); John Milton in Milton in America (1996); Charles Lamb in The Lambs of London.

Hawksmoor, winner of both the Whitbread Novel Award and the Guardian Fiction Prize, was inspired by Iain Sinclair's poem "Lud Heat" (1975), which speculated on a mystical power from the positioning of the six churches Nicholas Hawksmoor built. The novel gives Hawksmoor a Satanical motive for the siting of his buildings, and creates a modern namesake, a policeman investigating a series of murders. Chatterton (1987), a similarly layered novel explores plagiarism and forgery and was shortlisted for the Booker Prize. London: The Biography is an extensive and thorough discussion of London through the ages. In 1994 he was interviewed about the London Psychogeographical Association in an article for The Observer, in which he remarked:

I truly believe that there are certain people to whom or through whom the territory, the place, the past speaks. ... Just as it seems possible to me that a street or dwelling can materially affect the character and behaviour of the people who dwell in them, is it not also possible that within this city (London) and within its culture are patterns of sensibility or patterns of response which have persisted from the thirteenth and fourteenth centuries and perhaps even beyond?

In the sequence London: The Biography (2000), Albion: The Origins of the English Imagination (2002), and Thames: Sacred River (2007), Ackroyd has produced works of what he considers historical sociology. These books trace themes in London and English culture from the ancient past to the present, drawing again on his favoured notion of almost spiritual lines of connection rooted in place and stretching across time.

His fascination with London literary and artistic figures is also displayed in the sequence of biographies he has produced of Ezra Pound (1980), T. S. Eliot (1984), Charles Dickens (1990), William Blake (1995), Thomas More (1998), Geoffrey Chaucer (2004), William Shakespeare (2005), and J. M. W. Turner. The city itself stands astride all these works, as it does in the fiction. Ackroyd was forced to think of new methods of biography writing in T. S. Eliot when he was told he could not quote extensively from Eliot's poetry and unpublished letters.

From 2003 to 2005, Ackroyd wrote a six-book non-fiction series (Voyages Through Time), intended for readers as young as eight, his first work for children. The critically acclaimed series—described as "Not just sound-bite snacks for short attention spans, but unfolding feasts that leave you with a sense of wonder" by The Sunday Times is an extensive narrative of key periods in world history.

In a 2012 interview with Matthew Stadlen of the BBC, when asked the question, "Who do you think is the person who has made the biggest impact upon the life of this country ever?", Ackroyd said, "I think William Blake is the most powerful and most significant philosopher or thinker in the course of English history." In the same interview, when asked what fascinates him about London, he said he admired "its power, its majesty, its darkness, its shadows." When asked what he did outside of writing, he said, "I drink, that's about it."

== Personal life ==
Ackroyd had a long-term relationship with Brian Kuhn, an American dancer he met while at Yale. After a nervous breakdown in the late 1980s, Ackroyd moved to Devon with Kuhn. However, Kuhn was then diagnosed with AIDS and died in 1994, after which Ackroyd moved back to London. In 1999, he suffered a heart attack and was placed in a medically induced coma for a week.

In a 2004 interview, Ackroyd said that he had not been in a relationship since Kuhn's death and was "very happy being celibate."

== List of works ==
=== Poetry ===
- 1971 Ouch!
- 1973 London Lickpenny
- 1978 Country Life
- 1987 The Diversions of Purley and Other Poems (Hamish Hamilton) ISBN 9780241119945

=== Fiction ===
- 1982 The Great Fire of London (Hamish Hamilton) ISBN 9780241107041
- 1983 The Last Testament of Oscar Wilde (Hamish Hamilton) ISBN 9780241109649
- 1985 Hawksmoor (Hamish Hamilton) ISBN 9780241116647
- 1987 Chatterton (Hamish Hamilton, Grove) ISBN 9780802100412
- 1989 First Light (Grove) ISBN 9780802111616
- 1992 English Music (Knopf) ISBN 9780679409687
- 1993 The House of Doctor Dee (Hamish Hamilton) ISBN 9780241125007
- 1994 Dan Leno and the Limehouse Golem (also published as The Trial of Elizabeth Cree) (Vintage) ISBN 9780749396596
- 1996 Milton in America (Nan A. Talese) ISBN 9780385477086
- 1999 The Plato Papers: A Prophecy (Nan A. Talese) ISBN 9780385497688
- 2003 The Clerkenwell Tales (Chatto and Windus, Nan A. Talese) ISBN 9780385511216
- 2004 The Lambs of London (Nan A. Talese) ISBN 9780385514613
- 2006 The Fall of Troy (Nan A. Talese) ISBN 9780385522908
- 2008 The Casebook of Victor Frankenstein (Nan A. Talese) ISBN 9780385530842
- 2009 The Canterbury Tales – A Retelling (Penguin Classics) ISBN 9780143106173
- 2010 The Death of King Arthur: The Immortal Legend – A Retelling (Penguin Classics) ISBN 9780143106951
- 2013 Three Brothers (Nan A. Talese) ISBN 9780385538619
- 2020 Mr Cadmus (Canongate) ISBN 9781786898944

=== Non-fiction ===
- 1976 Notes for a New Culture: An Essay on Modernism
- 1979 Dressing Up: Transvestism and Drag, the History of an Obsession (Simon & Schuster) ISBN 9780671250911
- 1980 Ezra Pound and His World
- 1984 T. S. Eliot
- 1987 Dickens' London: An Imaginative Vision (Headline Books) ISBN 9780747279976
- 1989 Ezra Pound and his World (Charles Scribner's Sons) ISBN 9780684167985
- 1990 Dickens
- 1991 Introduction to Dickens
- 1995 Blake
- 1998 The Life of Thomas More (Nan A. Talese) ISBN 9780385477093
- 2000 London: The Biography
- 2000 The Mystery of Charles Dickens (biographical one-man show performed by Simon Callow)
- 2001 The Collection: Journalism, Reviews, Essays, Short Stories, Lectures
- 2002 Dickens: Public Life and Private Passion
- 2002 Albion: The Origins of the English Imagination (Knopf) ISBN 9780385497732
- 2003 The Beginning
- 2003 Illustrated London
- 2004 Escape From Earth (PublicAffairs) ISBN 9781610398718
- 2004 Ancient Egypt
- 2005 Shakespeare: The Biography
- 2005 Ancient Greece (Dorling Kindersley) ISBN 9781405307338
- 2005 Ancient Rome (Dorling Kindersley) ISBN 9780756616427
- 2007 Thames: Sacred River (Chatto and Windus) ISBN 9780701172848
- 2008 Coffee with Dickens (with Paul Schlicke) (Duncan Baird) ISBN 9781844836086
- 2009 Venice: Pure City (Nan A. Talese) ISBN 9780385531528
- 2010 The English Ghost: Spectres Through Time
- 2011 London Under (Vintage) ISBN 9780099287377
- 2011 The History of England, v.1 Foundation
- 2012 The History of England, v.2 Tudors
- 2014 The History of England, v.3 Civil War (also available as Rebellion: The History of England from James I to the Glorious Revolution)
- 2015 Alfred Hitchcock ISBN 9780385537414
- 2016 The History of England, v.4 Revolution
- 2017 Queer City: Gay London from the Romans to the Present Day (Abrams) ISBN 9781419730993
- 2018 The History of England, v.5 Dominion
- 2021 The History of England, v.6 Innovation
- 2021 Introducing Swedenborg (The Swedenborg Society) ISBN 9780854482207
- 2022 The Colours of London (Frances Lincoln) ISBN 9780711269422
- 2023 The English Actor: From Medieval to Modern (Reaktion Books) ISBN 9781789146998
- 2024 The English Soul: Faith of a Nation (Reaktion Books) ISBN 9781836390947
- 2025 Forgotten London: Exploring the Hidden Life of the City (Frances Lincoln) ISBN 978-0-7112-8764-8
- 2026 Auden (Reaktion Books) ISBN 978-1836391722 (on W. H. Auden)
  - Ackroyd's Brief Lives (Nan A. Talese, Doubleday)
  - 2004 Chaucer ISBN 9780385507974
  - 2006 J.M.W. Turner ISBN 9780385507981
  - 2008 Newton ISBN 9780385507998
  - 2008 Poe: A Life Cut Short ISBN 9780701169886
  - 2012 Wilkie Collins: A Brief Life ISBN 9780385537391
  - 2014 Charlie Chaplin: A Brief Life ISBN 9780385537377

=== Television ===
- 2002 Dickens (BBC)
- 2004 London (BBC)
- 2006 The Romantics (BBC)
- 2007 London Visions (BBC)
- 2008 Peter Ackroyd's Thames (ITV)
- 2009 Peter Ackroyd's Venice (BBC)

== Honours and awards ==
- 1984 Fellow of the Royal Society of Literature
- 1984 Heinemann Award (joint winner) for T. S. Eliot
- 1984 Somerset Maugham Award for The Last Testament of Oscar Wilde
- 1984 Whitbread Biography Award for T. S. Eliot
- 1985 Guardian Fiction Prize for Hawksmoor
- 1985 Whitbread Novel Award for Hawksmoor
- 1988 Booker Prize for Fiction – nomination (shortlist) for Chatterton
- 1998 James Tait Black Memorial Prize (for biography) for The Life of Thomas More
- 2001 South Bank Show Annual Award for Literature for London: The Biography
- 2003 British Book Awards Illustrated Book of the Year (Illustrated London shortlisted)
- 2003 Commander of the Most Excellent Order of the British Empire (CBE)
- 2006 Foreign Honorary Member of the American Academy of Arts and Sciences
- 2006 Honorary Doctor of Letters (D.Litt.) from Brunel University.

== See also ==
- List of children's non-fiction writers
