= David Choby =

His Excellency, The Most Reverend David Raymond Choby D.D., J.C.L.
- Bishop of Nashville
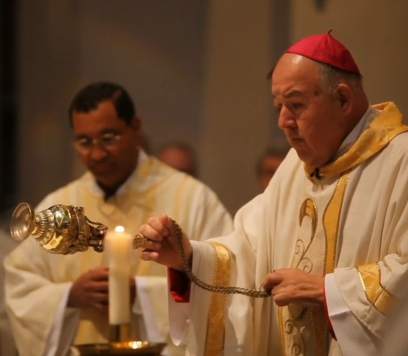
- Diocese: Diocese of Nashville
- Appointed: December 20, 2005
- Installed: February 27, 2006
- Term ended: June 3, 2017
- Predecessor: Edward U. Kmiec
- Successor: J. Mark Spalding
- Previous posts: • Board of Trustees, Pontifical College Josephinum (Incumbent) • Diocesan Administrator (2004–2006) • Pastor, St. John Vianney Parish (1989–2004) • Member, Diocesan Tribunal (1986–1989) • Administrator, St. Ann Parish (1983–1986) • Associate pastor, St. Joseph's-in-Madison Parish (1978–1983)

Orders
- Ordination: September 6, 1974 by Joseph Aloysius Durick
- Consecration: February 27, 2006 by Thomas C. Kelly, James Daniel Niedergeses, and Edward Kmiec

Personal details
- Born: January 17, 1947 Nashville, Tennessee, U.S.
- Died: June 3, 2017 (aged 70) Nashville, Tennessee, U.S.
- Denomination: Roman Catholic
- Parents: Raymond & Rita Choby
- Education: Aquinas College; St. Ambrose College; Catholic University of America; Pontifical University of St. Thomas Aquinas (Angelicum)
- Motto: That we may live

Styles of David Raymond Choby
- Reference style: His Excellency; The Most Reverend
- Spoken style: Your Excellency
- Religious style: Bishop

David Raymond Choby (January 17, 1947 – June 3, 2017) was an American prelate of the Roman Catholic Church. He served as the 11th bishop of the Diocese of Nashville in Tennessee from 2005 until his death in 2017.

== Biography ==
=== Early life ===
David Choby was born on January 17, 1947, in Nashville, Tennessee. He was the son of Raymond and Rita Choby. He had one sister, Diane C. Dyche of Fort Worth, Texas.

Choby was baptized in the Cathedral of the Incarnation in Nashville, where he would later be consecrated as bishop. He attended Catholic schools growing up, and graduated from Father Ryan High School in Nashville in 1965.

After spending one year at Aquinas College in Nashville, Choby entered the seminary at St. Ambrose College in Davenport, Iowa. He then studied at Catholic University of America in Washington, D.C.

=== Priesthood ===
Choby was ordained a priest for the Diocese of Nashville on September 6, 1974, by Bishop Joseph A. Durick at St. Henry Church in Belle Meade, Tennessee.

Choby served as associate pastor at St. Joseph Parish in Madison, Tennessee, administrator of St. Ann Parish in Nashville, and spent three years in residence at Christ the King Parish in Nashville while working at the Diocesan Tribunal. In 1989, he was appointed pastor at St. John Vianney Parish in Gallatin, Tennessee.

Choby attended the Pontifical University of St. Thomas Aquinas in Rome where he earned a canon law degree. He served as a member of the diocesan tribunal throughout most of his priesthood. He also served two five-year terms on the diocese's presbyteral council and college of consultors. From 1984 to 1989, Choby taught at the Pontifical College Josephinum, a seminary in Columbus, Ohio.

On August 12, 2004, Pope John Paul II appointed Bishop Edward U. Kmiec, as bishop of Buffalo. Choby was elected diocesan administrator by the diocesan College of Consultors.

=== Bishop of Nashville ===
Pope Benedict XVI appointed Choby as bishop of Nashville on December 20, 2005. He was only the second priest from Nashville to be appointed as its bishop. He was consecrated and installed on February 27, 2006, in the Cathedral Church of the Incarnation in Nashville.The principal consecrator was Archbishop Thomas C. Kelly. Choby chose as his episcopal motto: "That We May Live," a quotation from the Fourth Eucharistic Prayer.

=== Death and legacy ===
Choby was seriously injured in a fall in February 2017, forcing him to delegate governance of the diocese to Monsignor David Perkin, the vicar general. Choby died in Nashville on June 3, 2017.

Catholic Church titles
Preceded by Edward Urban Kmiec	Bishop of Nashville; 2006–2017	Succeeded by J. Mark Spalding
