= Dominican Sisters of St. Cecilia =

Catholic religious institute

Dominican Sisters of St. Cecilia Congregation
- Abbreviation: OP
- Nickname: Nashville Dominicans
- Formation: 1860; 166 years ago
- Founder: Dominican Sisters of St. Mary
- Founded at: Nashville, Tennessee
- Type: Religious Order of Pontifical Right (for Women)
- Headquarters: 801 Dominican Drive, Nashville, Tennessee
- Members: 300 (2015)
- Motto: To Contemplate and give to others the fruits of our contemplation
- Prioress General: Mother Anna Grace Neenan (2018-2030)
- Ministry: Education, campus ministry, nursing, hosting retreats, Hispanic evangelization
- Patron saint: St. Cecilia
- Affiliations: Catholic Church

The Congregation of St. Cecilia, commonly known as the Nashville Dominicans, is a religious institute of the Roman Catholic Church located in Nashville, Tennessee. It is a member of the Council of Major Superiors of Women Religious, one of the two organizations which represent women religious in the United States (the other is the Leadership Conference of Women Religious). The sisters combine a monastic communal lifestyle of contemplation in the Dominican tradition with an active apostolate in Catholic education. As of 2018, the congregation has 300 sisters.

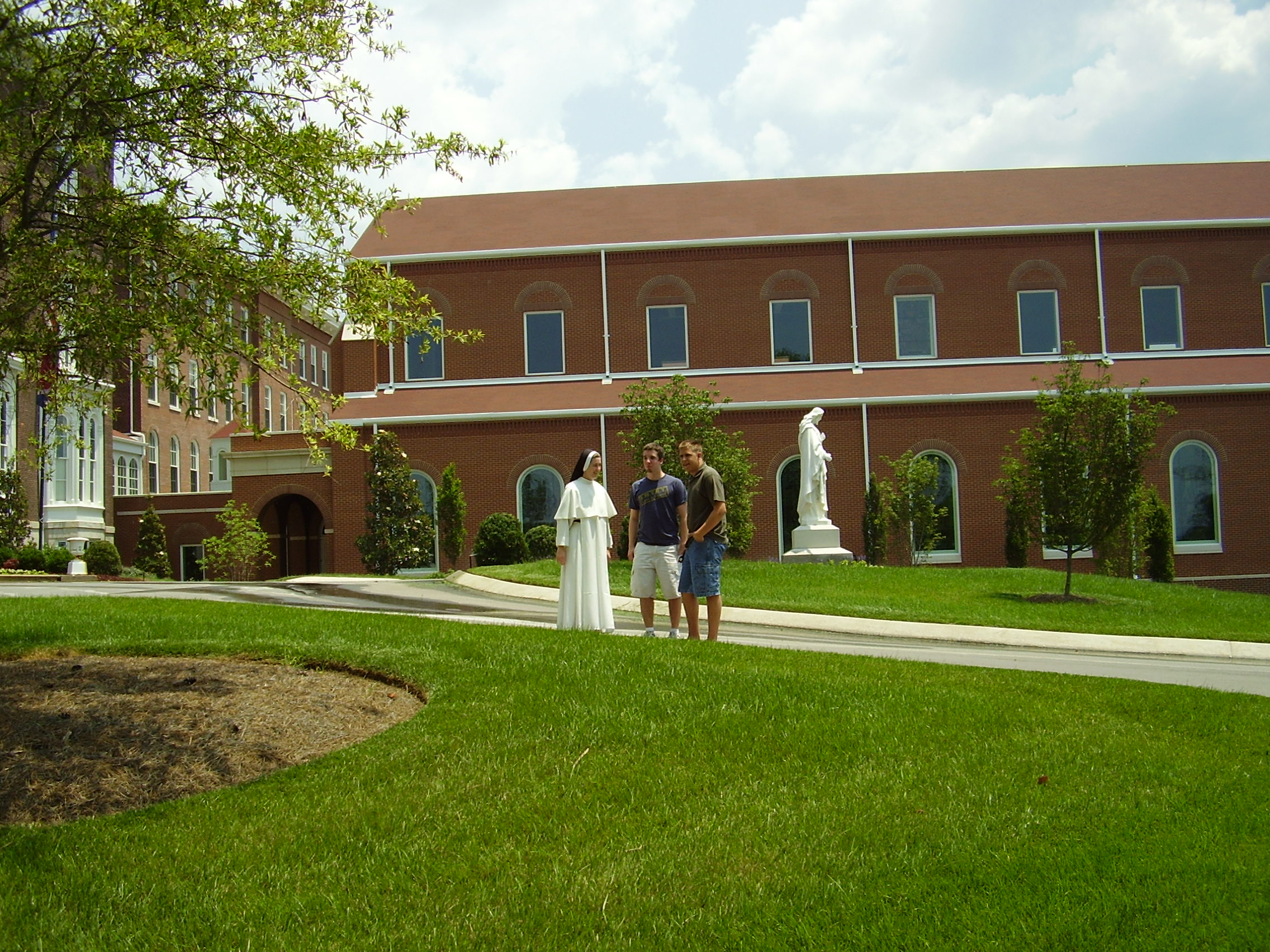
The institute's motherhouse in Nashville, Tennessee.

== Foundation and 19th century ==
In 1860, James Whelan, the second bishop of the Diocese of Nashville, a Dominican, requested that sisters establish a school in his diocese. The Dominican Sisters of St. Mary in Somerset, Ohio, responded by sending four members to Nashville, where they opened an academy in 1862 specializing in music and the fine arts. Two years later, the new community witnessed the US Civil War at the Battle of Nashville in December 1864. After the battle, the new community took on the responsibility of caring for numerous children at a nearby orphanage.

After the Civil War, the enrollment dropped. In 1867, the year in which the community welcomed its first postulant, debts were so serious that the property was put up for public auction. Patrick Feehan, then Bishop of Nashville, joined with some friends to purchase the property, immediately returning it to the Sisters. However, the small community continued to struggle as debts mounted and four of its members left to establish a new foundation in the more promising and prosperous Washington, D.C.

In the mid-1860s, Nashville suffered a particularly serious outbreak of cholera. In an area sometimes known for its anti-Catholicism, the Sisters gained great respect by remaining in the town to care for the sick. They also went to assist the people of Memphis as thousands fled the city in the wake of the epidemic; of the 50 Sisters who served as nurses, 30 died.

The community continued to grow and by the late 1880s, it was necessary to build not only an extension to the convent but also the school. By this time, the Sisters had expanded their teaching to schools in other parts of the state, including Chattanooga, Clarksville, Memphis and Winchester.

== 20th-21st centuries ==
In 1913, the Congregation of Saint Cecilia was formally affiliated with the Dominicans, and in 1915 they established a link with the Catholic University of America to properly certify their Sister-teachers. The community prospered to such an extent that, just before the onset of the Great Depression, it was able to purchase prime Nashville land that would later become the site of Aquinas College, Overbrook School and St. Cecilia Academy. In 1935, when the Congregation celebrated its 75th anniversary in the midst of the Great Depression, the Sisters had established or begun to operate schools throughout Tennessee as well as in Illinois, Ohio and Virginia. At that time, there were some 115 sisters, teaching 2,000 students in 14 schools. Through the 1940s and 1950s the Congregation continued to expand its network of schools.

Following the Second Vatican Council (1962–1965) the Congregation, like all other communities in the Latin Church, underwent a period of reflection and discernment regarding its charism and ministry. However, unlike many other groups, the Nashville Dominicans decided to retain the wearing of a religious habit, in a slightly modified form. The Congregation also opted to maintain its focus on Catholic education. Although their primary apostolate is teaching, the sisters also engage in campus ministry, nursing, hosting retreats at their Bethany Retreat Center in Dickson, TN, Hispanic evangelization, and several other ministries.

Since Vatican II, the Nashville Dominicans have continued to expand, establishing further schools and ministries in Tennessee as well as in Birmingham, Alabama; Denver, Colorado; Bremerton, Washington; Joliet, Illinois; Minneapolis-Saint Paul; Arlington, Virginia; Atlanta, Georgia; Sydney, Australia; Elgin, Aberdeen, Scotland; Sittard, Netherlands; and most recently in Limerick, Ireland; as well as many other locations in the United States.

== Community life ==
For the Catholic Church the "perfection of charity, to which all the faithful are called, entails for those who freely follow the call to consecrated life the obligation of practicing chastity in celibacy for the sake of the Kingdom, poverty and obedience. It is the profession of these counsels, within a permanent state of life recognised by the Church that characterises the life consecrated to God." Thus, like all religious, the Nashville Dominicans embrace the evangelical counsels of poverty, chastity and obedience. For their sisters, the journey to making perpetual profession of these vows lasts 8–9 years, and is in six main stages.

=== Inquiry ===
This is the first stage, during which a young woman corresponds with the Congregation, has various conversations with the director of vocations, participates in a retreat and undergoes a psychological evaluation.

=== Pre-postulancy ===
This follows for those who are accepted and lasts until it is time to enter the convent along with other prospective sisters. It is a period of opportunity for the candidate to deepen her spiritual life by daily reading of the Bible, meeting with a priest for spiritual direction and frequent participation in the Eucharist.

=== Postulancy ===
Postulancy begins when the young woman enters the convent and is given a modified version of the religious habit. The postulants spend the next year learning how to live in community as well as becoming familiar with Catholic spirituality and the Dominican way of life. There are also classes in basic Catholic doctrine, Church history and philosophy.

=== Novitiate ===
In 2018 at the General Chapter the period of novitiate was extended to two years novitiate It follows postulancy. To mark the transition, the novice is clothed in the Dominican habit; whereas members who have professed vows after novitiate wear black veils, novices (who have not made vows) wear a white veil. The novitiate years are crucial, for it is then "…that the novices better understand their divine vocation, and indeed one which is proper to the institute, experience the manner of living of the institute, and form their mind and heart in its spirit, and so that their intention and suitability are tested." Thus, the novices are given the opportunity for longer periods of prayer and spiritual reading, as well as silence, in order to reflect on the vocation God is offering and their response. To nurture this process novices also study the Bible, various spiritual writings, patristics and the significance of the evangelical counsels. The first year of the Novitiate is the Canonical Year which concentrates on nurturing the inner and spiritual life of the sister. The second year of the Novitiate is the Apostolic Year when the sister is introduced to the apostolate and work of the community, in this case, teaching.

=== First and Temporary profession ===
First profession follows the novitiate. "By religious profession, members assume the observance of the three evangelical counsels by public vow, are consecrated to God through the ministry of the Church, and are incorporated into the institute." During the celebration of the Eucharist the novices make their first profession for three years and are clothed in the black veil. The Code of Canon Law of the Latin Church states that this period must be a minimum of three, but no longer than six years. When the three years of temporary vows are complete, the sister renews her vows for a minimum of five years after first profession until the time of final profession arrives. Between this time and perpetual profession, the Sisters learn how to live the evangelical counsels in a practical manner.

Apart from working towards receiving certification as teachers, Sisters in this stage of formation finish other college course work as well as take further classes in theology and philosophy. It is also possible that a sister may begin teaching during this period if she has previously obtained her certification.

=== Perpetual profession ===
This is the culmination of the preceding years. Even after this profession, the journey continues, for "Through their entire life, religious are to continue diligently their spiritual, doctrinal, and practical formation." Thus, the Nashville Dominicans pursue ongoing formation and study throughout all their lives.

== Daily life ==
The daily life of the Nashville Sisters follows a traditional pattern.

A typical weekday may follow the following schedule: The Sisters rise at 5:00am and begin 30 minutes of meditation at 5:30am. Meditation is followed by Lauds and the celebration of the Eucharist at 6:15am after which the Sisters have breakfast before beginning studies or teaching. At 5:00pm the community gathers to pray Vespers, and rosary, then have dinner and then a period of recreation until 7:30pm. At 7:30pm the Sisters engage in spiritual reading, leading up to the final communal activity of the day, the praying of Compline. After Compline, silence is maintained during which the sisters may prepare lessons or mark papers, spend time in personal prayer, while others may study, do some spiritual reading or whatever is needed (such as extra sleep). Usually by 10:00pm the sisters have returned to their private rooms (cells), and by 11pm the sisters are in bed.

== Other Endeavors ==
=== Virtues in Practice Program ===
In 2013, the sisters launched an online educational program entitled the Virtues in Practice Program. Virtues in Practice is a program for children in grades pre-kindergarten through eight to grow closer to Jesus by imitating His life and virtues. It is set up in such a way that a whole school studies the same virtue each month, to provide a whole-school (and at home, whole-family) focus. The program covers 27 virtues over a three-year cycle, with 81 saints held up as models of the virtues. The Congregation offers this program free of charge.

=== A Short Guide to Praying as a Family ===
In 2015, the Congregation published A Short Guide to Praying as a Family. This book provides a simple and easy-to-implement plan for family prayer. Arranged successively according to the basic stages of prayer, A Short Guide to Praying as a Family allows each family member to progress from one level of prayer to the next, following a child's growth in age. It also treats parents praying together and for their family, and living a life of faith informed by the virtues. This book contains 180 pages and over 125 full-color photos of stained glass artwork complementing the types of prayer it introduces.

== See also ==
- List of Catholic religious institutes
