= Thomas Sebastian Byrne =

American prelate

His Excellency, The Right Reverend Thomas Sebastian Byrne
- Bishop of Nashville
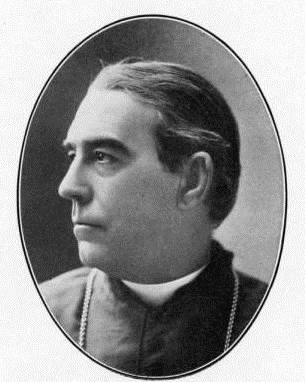
- Church: Catholic Church
- Diocese: Diocese of Nashville
- Appointed: May 10, 1894
- Term ended: September 4, 1923 (his death)
- Predecessor: Joseph Rademacher
- Successor: Alphonse John Smith

Orders
- Ordination: May 22, 1869 by John Baptist Purcell
- Consecration: July 25, 1894 by William Henry Elder

Personal details
- Born: July 28, 1841 Hamilton, Ohio, U.S.
- Died: September 4, 1923 (aged 82) Nashville, Tennessee, U.S.
- Education: Mount St. Mary's Seminary of the West; Pontifical North American College
- Motto: Deiparae immaculatae (Immaculate mother of God)

Thomas Sebastian Byrne (July 28, 1841 – September 4, 1923) was an American prelate of the Catholic Church. He served as bishop of the Diocese of Nashville in Tennessee from 1894 until his death in 1923. Byrne was also known for his translations and original works on Catholic history and other topics.

== Biography ==
=== Early life ===
Thomas Byrne was born on July 28, 1841, in Hamilton, Ohio, to Irish immigrants Eugene and Mary Anne (née Reynolds) Byrne. Eugene Byrne died when he was only nine months old; Thomas Byrne left school at age 11 to become an apprentice machinist. Byrne had frequently served as an altar boy to Stephen Badin, the first Catholic priest ordained in the United States.

At age 18, Byrne entered St. Thomas Seminary in Bardstown, Kentucky, to begin his preparatory studies for the priesthood. After a few years at Bardstown, Byrne continued his classical education at Mount St. Mary's Seminary of the West in Cincinnati, graduating in 1865. He attended the seminary alongside Peter Fenelon Collier, whom Byrne befriended and dissuaded from entering the priesthood. He helped Collier obtain a position at Sadlier, launching a successful publishing career.

Byrne was chosen by Archbishop John Purcell to further his studies in philosophy and theology at the Pontifical North American College in Rome in 1865. He remained there for three years, until failing health caused him to return to Cincinnati in October 1868. Purcell's opinion of Byrne was so high that, before his ordination, he appointed him to the faculty of Mount St. Mary's, as well as the seminary's procurator.

=== Priesthood ===
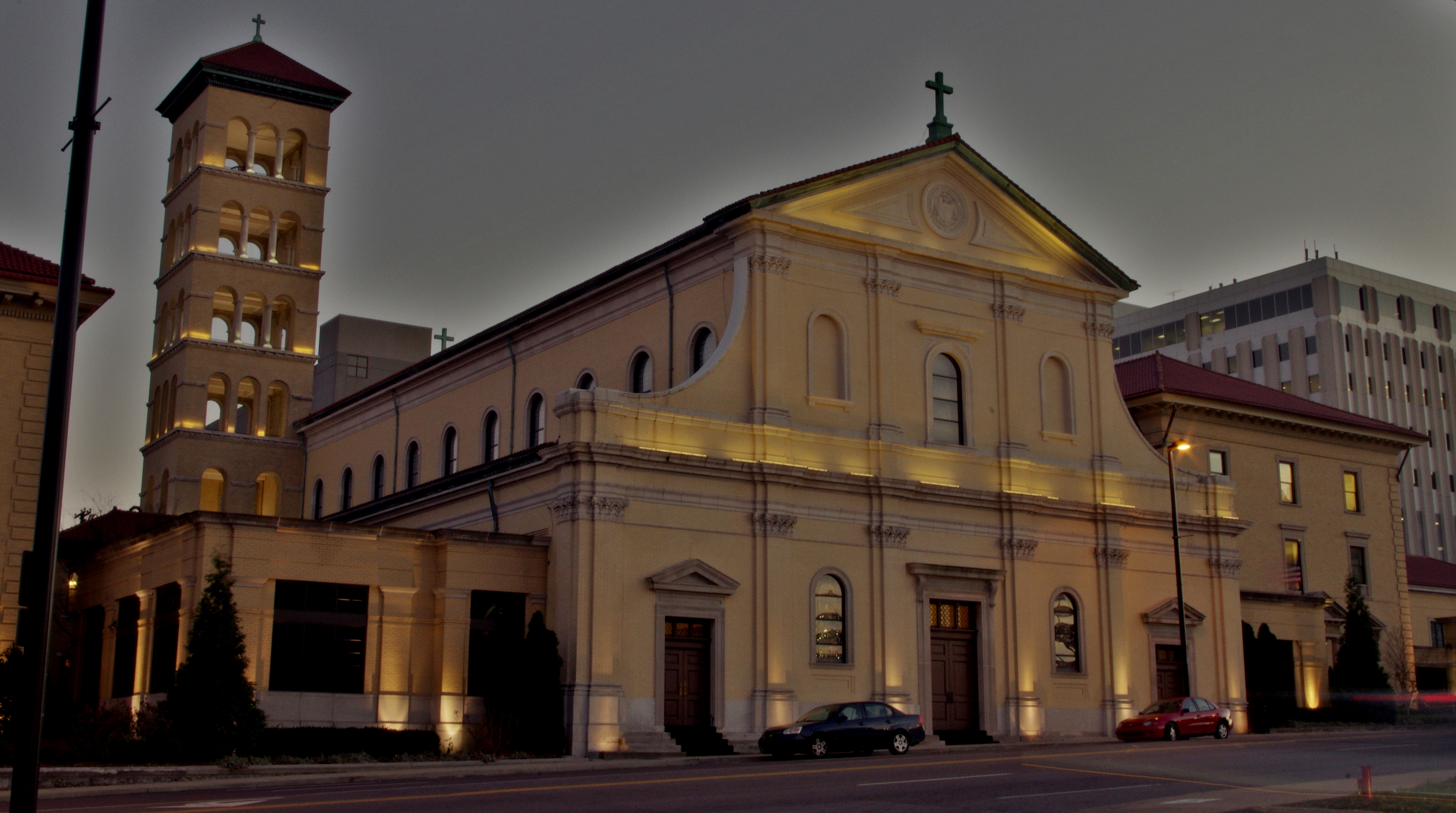
Cathedral of the Incarnation, Nashville, Tennessee (2013)

Byrne was ordained a priest for the Archdiocese of Cincinnati on May 22, 1869, by Archbishop Purcell in the Mount St. Mary chapel. He continued to teach at the seminary while also serving as chaplain to the Sisters of Charity at their motherhouse in Delhi, Ohio (1869–1886) and pastor of St. Vincent de Paul Church in Cincinnati (1877–1886). During this time, he established a name for himself in the field of literature. In collaboration with the rector of Mount St. Mary's, he translated Johann Baptist Alzog's Manual of Universal Church History. The first volume was published in 1874, and the project took six years to complete.

In 1879, Mount St. Mary's closed due to financial difficulty and Byrne went to reside at the Sisters of Charity motherhouse in Delhi, Ohio. From November to December 1884, he attended the third Plenary Council of Baltimore as a theological consultant to Cincinnati's new archbishop, William Elder. Byrne was appointed rector of the Cathedral of St. Peter in 1886, and established the Springer Institute in Cincinnati during his brief tenure there. When Mount St. Mary's reopened in 1887, Byrne was appointed rector and remained in that position until 1894.

=== Bishop of Nashville ===
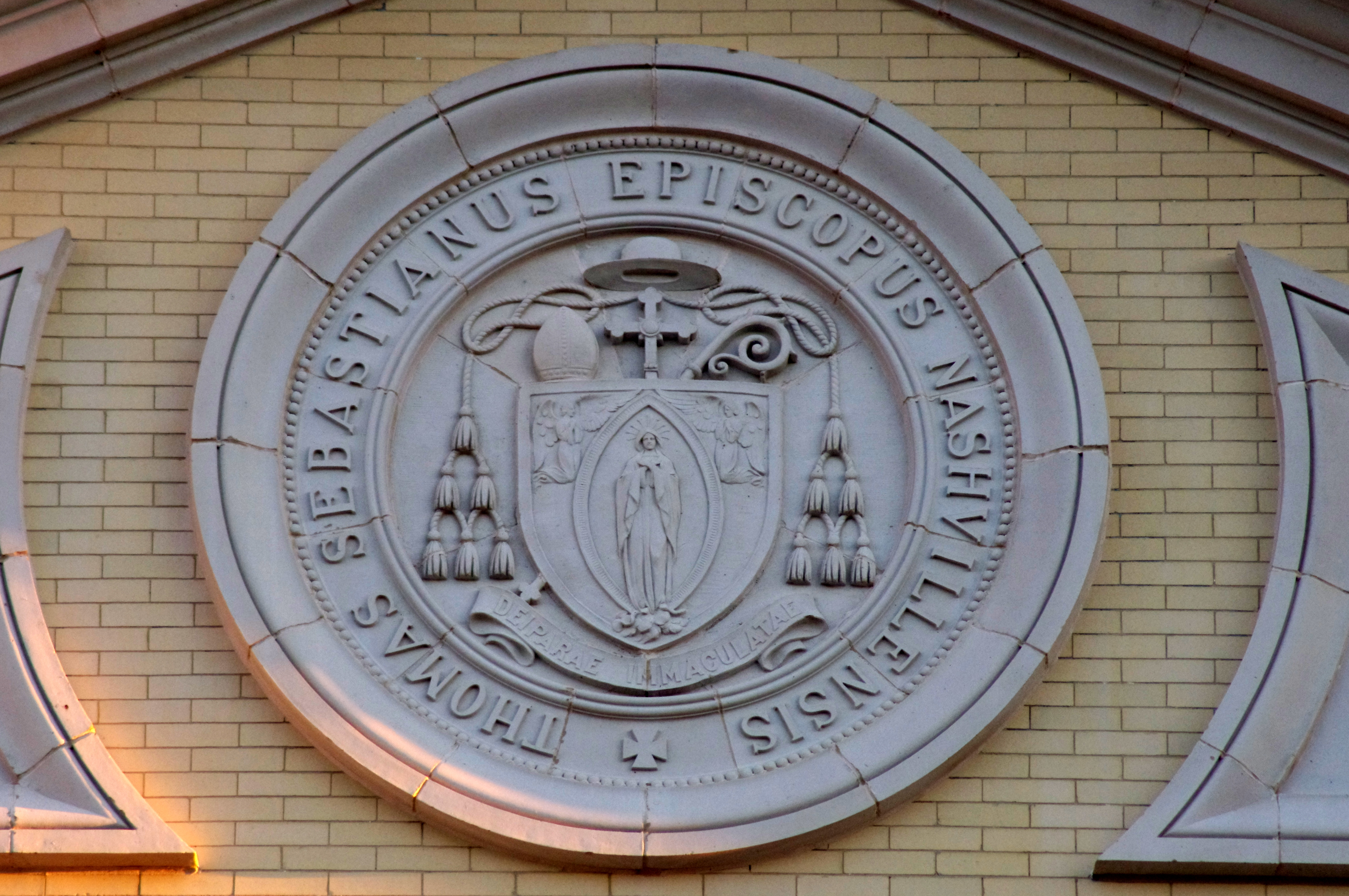
Byrne's ecclesiastical heraldry displayed on the Cathedral of the Incarnation (2013)

On May 10, 1894, Byrne was appointed the fifth bishop of Nashville by Pope Leo XIII, then covering the entire state of Tennessee. He succeeded Bishop Joseph Rademacher, who had been transferred to the Diocese of Fort Wayne. Byrne received his episcopal consecration on July 25, 1894, from Archbishop Elder, with Bishops John Watterson and Camillus Maes serving as co-consecrators, at St. Joseph's Church in Nashville.

In 1893, the year before Byrne arrived in Nashville, the diocese contained 18,000 Catholics, 38 churches, and 30 priests. By the time of his death 30 years later in 1923, there were 25,000 Catholics, 58 churches, and 53 priests. One of Byrne's most significant accomplishments was the construction of a new cathedral. Unhappy with the size of the Cathedral of the Blessed Virgin of the Seven Sorrows, Byrne acquired new property in 1902 and completed the Cathedral of the Incarnation in 1914. As part of the cathedral's complex, he also built a new rectory and school. St. Thomas Hospital in Nashville was also established during his tenure.

Byrne continued to gain attention for his literary work, translating Jesus Living in the Priest by Jacques Millet (1901), An Abridgment of Christian Doctrine prescribed by Pope Pius X (1905), and Geremia Bonomelli's New Series of Homilies for the Whole Year (four volumes, 1909–1911) and Christian Mysteries (four volumes, 1910). He was the author of Man from a Catholic Point of View, which he read at the Parliament of the World's Religions in 1903.

=== Death ===
Thomas Byrne died at his residence in Nashville on September 4, 1923, at age 82.

Catholic Church titles
Preceded by Joseph Rademacher	Bishop of Nashville; 1894–1923	Succeeded by Alphonse John Smith
