= Diocese of Nashville =

Latin Catholic ecclesiastical jurisdiction in Tennessee, United States

Coordinates: 36°9′2″N 86°47′59″W

Diocese of Nashville Dioecesis Nashvillensis
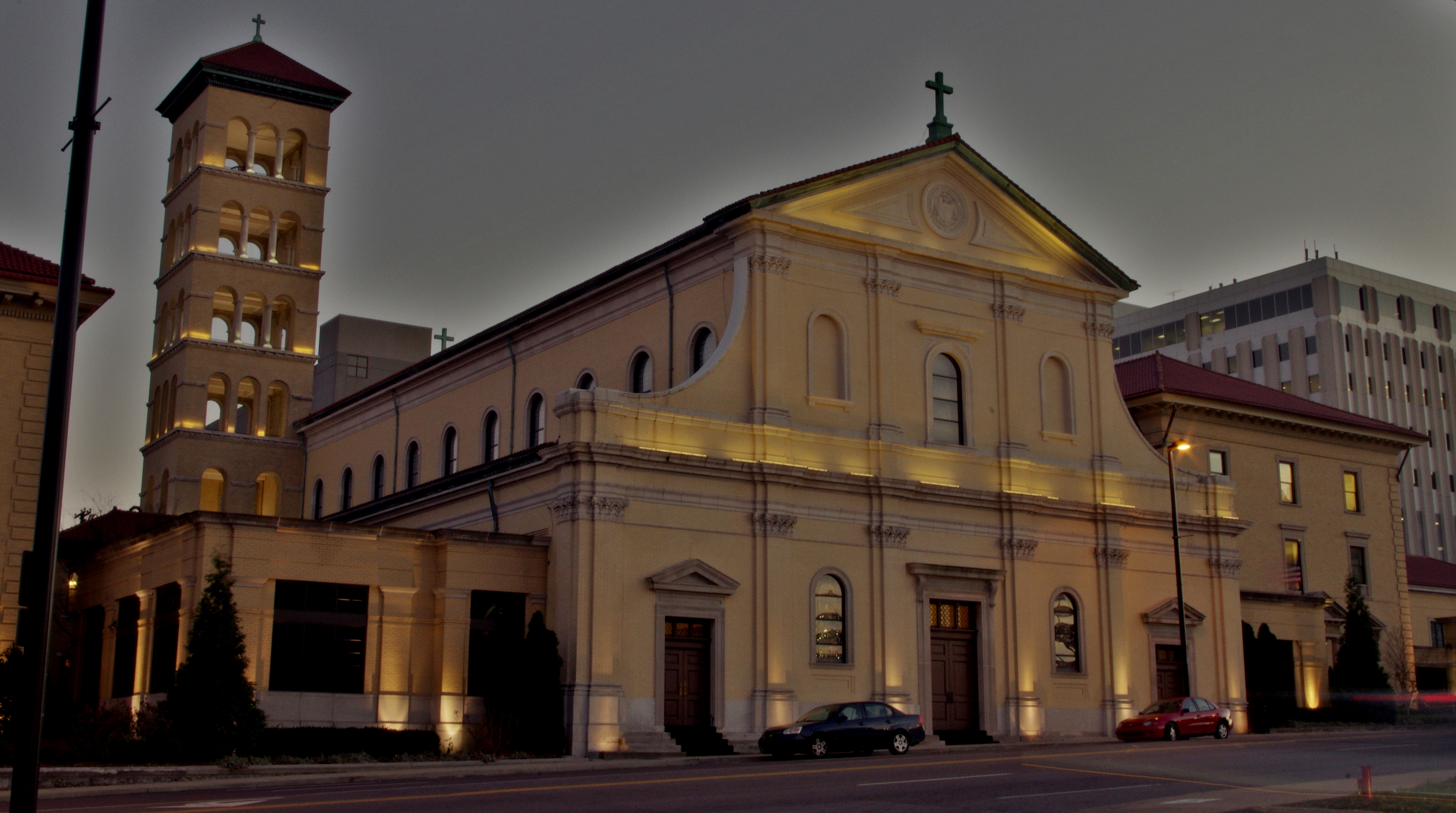
- Cathedral of the Incarnation

- Coat of arms

Location
- Country: United States
- Territory: Middle Tennessee
- Ecclesiastical province: Louisville

Statistics
- Area: 42,222 km^{2} (16,302 sq mi)
- Population: Total; Catholics: (as of 2025); 2,973,403; 126,251 (4.2%)
- Parishes: 61

Information
- Denomination: Roman Catholic
- Sui iuris church: Latin Church
- Rite: Roman Rite
- Established: July 28, 1837
- Cathedral: Cathedral of the Incarnation
- Patron saint: Saint Joseph

Current leadership
- Pope: Leo XIV
- Bishop: J. Mark Spalding
- Metropolitan Archbishop: Shelton Fabre

Map
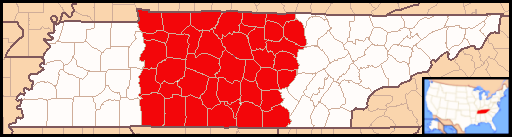

Website
- dioceseofnashville.com

The Diocese of Nashville (Latin: Dioecesis Nashvillensis) is a diocese of the Catholic Church in the central part of Tennessee in the United States. Erected in 1837, it is a suffragan diocese of the Archdiocese of Louisville. The bishop is J. Mark Spalding.

The Diocese of Nashville is the largest diocese in Tennessee by population. The Cathedral of the Incarnation in Nashville, Tennessee, is the seat of the bishop.

== Statistics ==
The Diocese of Nashville encompasses 38 counties spread over 16,302 square miles of Middle Tennessee. As of 2026, the Catholic population in the diocese is approximately 128,250. The diocese has 61 churches served by 109 priests and 103 permanent deacons.

== History ==
=== 1800 to 1850 ===
In 1808, Pope Pius VII erected the Diocese of Bardstown, a huge diocese in the American South and Midwest. The new state of Tennessee, formed in 1796, became part of this diocese. The first Catholic church in Nashville was Holy Rosary, constructed in 1820. According to local history, contractors had brought Irish workers to Nashville to construct the first bridge in over the Cumberland River. However, they refused to work until they had a church to pray in. Eager to have a bridge, the local population donated land for the construction of Holy Rosary. It was built where the Tennessee State Capitol stands today.

Pope Gregory XVI erected the Diocese of Nashville on July 28, 1837, taking all of Tennessee from the Diocese of Bardstown. The pope assigned the new diocese as a suffragan of the Archdiocese of Baltimore. Holy Rosary Church became the Cathedral of the Holy Rosary.

Gregory XVI in July 1837 selected Richard Miles of Bardstown to serve as the first bishop of Nashville. Arriving alone in the city, Miles did not have a bishop's residence to live in. He was forced to rent a room in a boarding house, where he almost immediately fell seriously ill with a fever. A priest travelling through Nashville nursed Miles back to good health. His congregation consisted of approximately 100 families scattered throughout the state. Miles traveled on horseback to meet with them.

During his tenure, Miles ordained the first priest in Tennessee, and established a seminary and a hospital, run by the Sisters of Charity of Nazareth from Bardstown, and an orphanage run by the sisters of St. Dominic. Needing a larger cathedral, Miles constructed the Cathedral of the Blessed Virgin of the Seven Sorrows; he dedicated it in 1848.

=== 1850 to 1880 ===
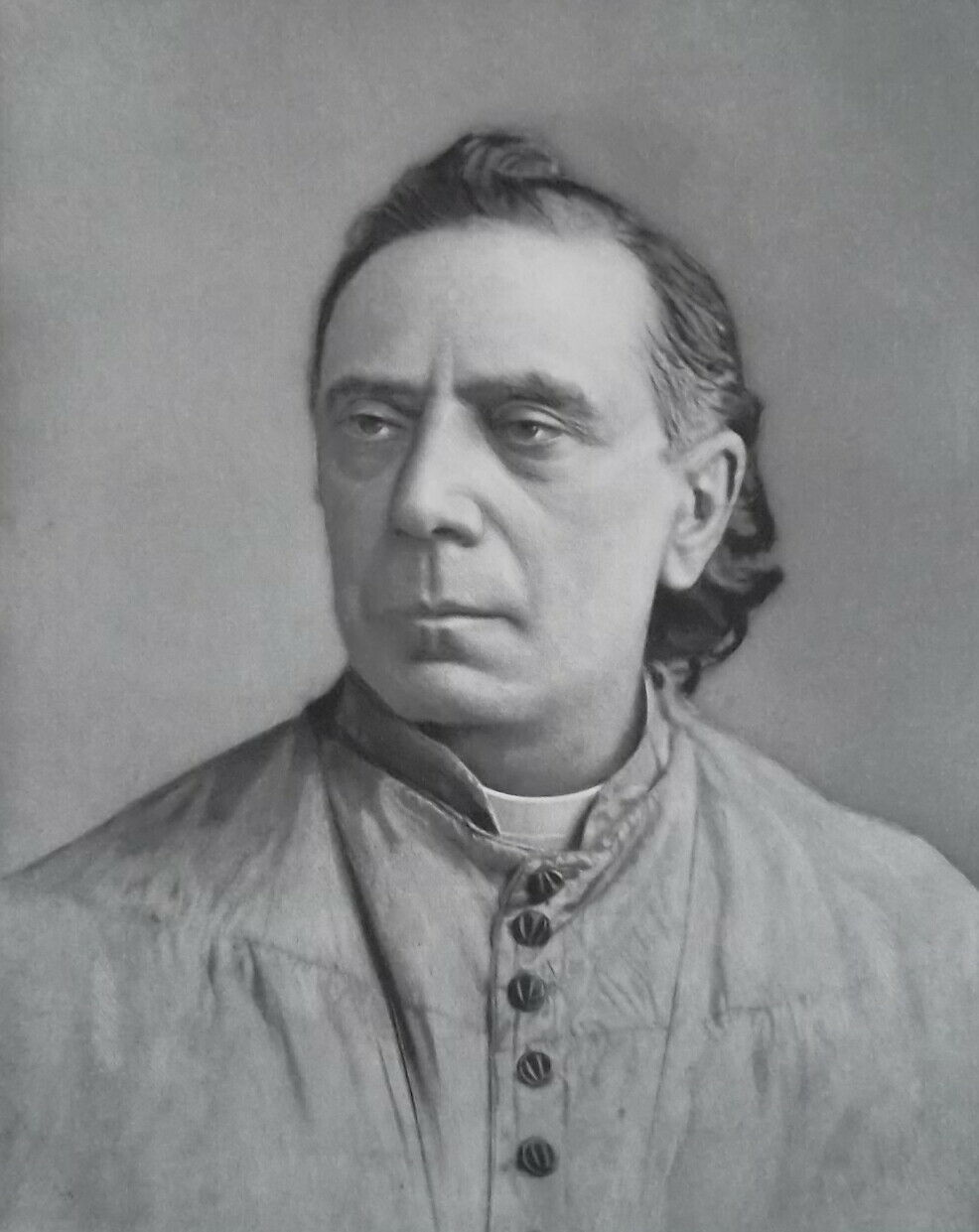
Bishop Feehan (1889)

In 1859, Pope Pius IX appointed James Whelan of the Dominican Order as coadjutor bishop of the diocese to assist Miles. When Miles died in 1860, Whelan automatically succeeded him as bishop of Nashville. During this period, Whelan enlarged Blessed Virgins Cathedral. In 1860, he invited the Dominicans Sisters in Somerset, Ohio, to send a contingent to Nashville to start a school. The American Civil War began in 1861, with Tennessee becoming part of the Confederate States of America. In 1862, the sisters opened St. Cecelia Academy for girls. The next year, the sisters founded St. Mary's Orphanage in the city.

By February 1864, stressed by the Civil War, Whelan resigned as bishop of Nashville. In December 1864, the sisters and students at St. Cecelia observed the two-day Battle of Nashville from the academy rooftop. During the battle, a Union Army chaplain and a local priest evacuated St. Mary's Orphanage before it was destroyed. In July 1865, several weeks after the end of the war, Pius IX replaced Whelan with Patrick Feehan of the Archdiocese of St. Louis.

Feehan began rebuilding the diocese, ravaged by the war. When St. Cecelia Academy went into foreclosure, he purchased the property and returned it to the Dominicans. During the summer and fall of 1866, Feehan worked to help the sick from a cholera outbreak in Nashville. After the end of the pandemic, he invited the Sisters of Mercy in Providence, Rhode Island, to come to Nashvillee and live in a house he purchased.

The diocese was hard hit by bank closures and the depression of 1873. To help his parishioners, Feehan encouraged a group of men to create a fraternal organization that would be known as Catholic Knights of America. In 1877 and 1878, the diocese suffered yellow fever outbreaks, resulting in the deaths of 13 religious sisters and nine priests, including the vicar-general.

=== 1880 to 1900 ===
In 1880, Pope Leo XIII appointed Feehan as archbishop of the Archdiocese of Chicago. The next bishop of Nashville was Joseph Rademacher from the Diocese of Fort Wayne, named by Leo XIII in 1883. Ten years later, Rademacher was appointed bishop of the Diocese of Fort Wayne by Leo XIII. Rademacher's successor in Nashville was Thomas Byrne of the Archdiocese of Cincinnati, selected by the pope in 1894.

By 1893, the diocese had a population of 18,000 Catholics, served by 38 churches with 30 priests. Several members of the Daughters of Charity arrived in Nashville in 1898 to open a hospital. Byrne purchased a mansion for that purpose. Later that year, St. Thomas Hospital, named in honor of Byrne, was established. Today it is Ascension Saint Thomas West Hospital.

=== 1900 to 1930 ===
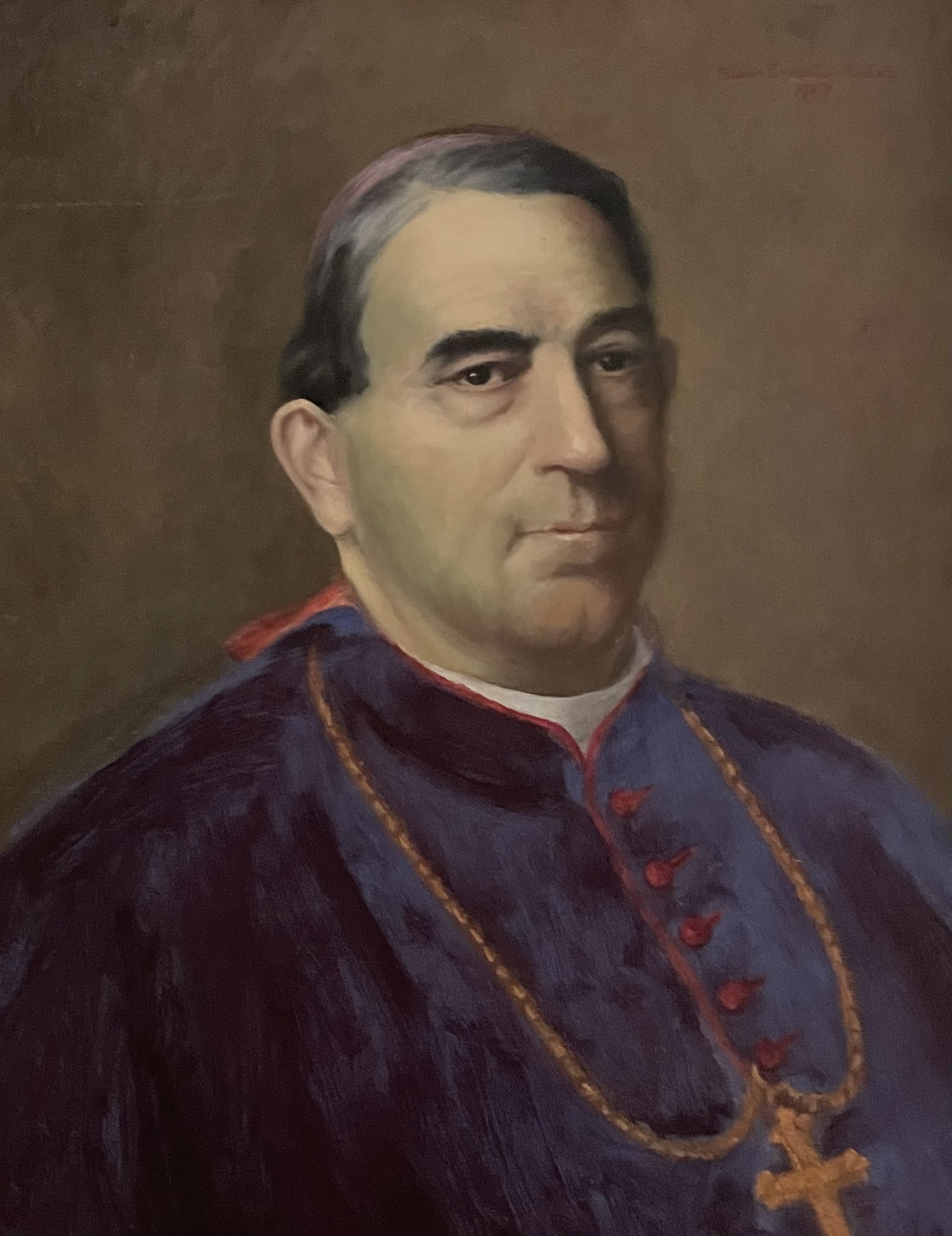
Bishop Byrne

Byrne's most significant projects was the construction of a larger cathedral. In 1902, he purchased a property for the new cathedral on the west side on Nashvile. The rectory was completed in 1908, along with the cathedral school building. Construction began on the cathedral in 1910. Byrne dedicated the new Cathedral of the Incarnation in 1914. Byrne died in September 1923. By the time of his death, the diocese had a Catholic population of 25,000, served in 58 churches by 53 priests.

Pope Pius IX in December 1923 appointed Alphonse Smith of the Diocese of Indianapolis as the new bishop of Nashville. When Smith came to the diocese, he found that it had only a few native priests and ten seminarians. Within two years, the number of seminarians from Tennessee had risen to 60; Smith ordained 26 priests during his episcopate. Several new parishes and schools were also established. In 1925, Smith founded Father Ryan High School in Nashville.

=== 1930 to 1960 ===
Smith died in 1935. In 1936, William Adrian of the Diocese of Davenport was appointed the seventh bishop of Nashville by Pope Pius XII. In 1937, Pius XI transferred the diocese to the new Archdiocese of Louisville from the Archdiocese of Baltimore. That same year, Adrian founded the Tennessee Register, the diocesan newspaper. The Cathedral of the Incarnation also underwent a major renovation in 1937.

Adrian oversaw the creation of several parishes, the acquisition of a new episcopal residence in East Nashville and the establishment of a diocesan chapter of the National Council of Catholic Women.In 1954, Adrian ordered the racial desegregation of all parochial schools in Nashville and Davidson County, far ahead of public school desegregation in those areas.

=== 1960 to 1970 ===
The Dominican Sisters of St. Cecilia opened Aquinas College in Nashville in 1961 to provide a teaching education to its novices. Adrian in 1962 organized the Nashville office of Catholic Charities USA. In December 1963, Pope Paul VI appointed Auxiliary Bishop Joseph Durick of the Diocese of Mobile-Birmingham as coadjutor bishop of Nashville to help Adrian.

In April 1963, while still in Alabama, Durick and seven other colleagues wrote the letter "A Call For Unity". It called on Dr. Martin Luther King Jr. and so-called "outsiders" to stop the Birmingham campaign of protests and boycotts. The letter said that African-Americans should let the courts work toward racial integration. King responded to Durick's letter with his "Letter from Birmingham Jail". He voiced his disappointment with the white clergy, whom he felt should be "among our strongest allies". King's letter, along with the teachings of the Second Vatican Council, led Durick to become a strong voice for civil rights.

While bishop of Nashville, Durick continued to express support for the American Civil Rights Movement. Some elements in the diocese labeled Durick as a heretic and communist, and organized boycotts of his public appearances in his final year. When Adrian retired as bishop of Nashville in 1969, Durick automatically became the new bishop.

=== 1970 to 2000 ===
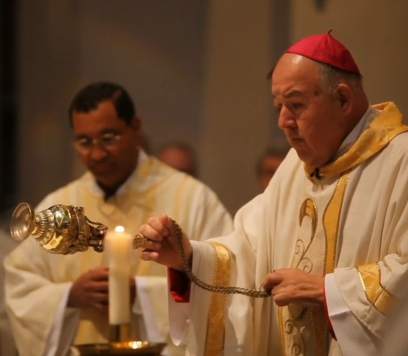
Bishop Choby

In 1970, Pope Paul VI erected the new Diocese of Memphis, taking the Tennessee counties west of the Tennessee River from the Diocese of Nashville. Suffering from cancer, Durick retired as bishop of Nashville in April 1975.

In April 1975, James Niedergeses of Nashville was appointed the next bishop of Nashville by Paul VI. Niegergeses made numerous trips to rural parishes in the diocese and devoted much time to the building of ecumenical relationships with Jews and Protestants. In 1988, Pope John Paul II created the Diocese of Knoxville, taking the eastern counties of Tennessee from the Diocese of Nashville.

Niedergeses retired as bishop of Nashville in October 1992. John Paul II replaced Niedergeses with Auxiliary Bishop Edward Kmiec of the Diocese of Trenton that same month. During his tenure, Kmiec dedicated Pope John Paul II High School in Hendersonville.

=== 2000 to present ===
In 2004, Kmiec was named bishop of the Diocese of Buffalo. The next bishop of Nashville was David Choby of Nashville, named by Pope Benedict XVI in 2005. A 2014 study by the Center for Applied Research in the Apostolate (CARA) at Georgetown University in Washington, D.C., cited the Diocese of Nashville as having the 8th highest rate of Catholic conversions in the United States. Choby died in 2017.

Pope Francis named J. Mark Spalding as the bishop of Nashville in 2017. Spalding had previously served as vicar general of Louisville. Spaulding in March 2023 celebrated a special mass at the Cathedral of the Incarnation for the three children and three adults killed in the mass shooting at Covenant School in Nashville that month.

=== Sexual abuse cases ===
In 1991, Ron Dickman left the priesthood. The next year, he was forced to resign as executive director of the Crisis Intervention Center in Nashville due to sexual assault allegations.

David Brown, a Father Ryan alumnus, alleged in 2005 that Paul Haas, the biology teacher at Father Ryan, had sexually assaulted him several times in 1961 when he was 15-years-old. Brown had reported Haas to the diocese in 1996. Brown accepted a small financial settlement from the diocese. The Tennessee Supreme Court in 2005 found that Giacosa and Bishop Niedergeses were aware in 1986 that McKeown "had sexual contact with approximately thirty boys over the past 14 years." The diocese sent McKeown to inpatient treatment in Hartford, Connecticut, from October 1986 to March 1987. In 1989, McKeown presented a boy with a condom at a Christmas party. At that point, Niedergeses ordered McKeown to leave diocesan property. However, the diocese continued to pay McKeown until early 1994.

Between 1995 and 1999, the Supreme Court noted that McKeown sexually abused two minor boys. The boys' parents reported the abuse to the Metropolitan Nashville Police Department, who arrested McKeown. He was convicted of rape in 1999 and sentenced to 25 years in prison. McKeown died in prison in 2018.

In February 2020, the diocese released the names of 25 clergy with credible accusations of sexual abuse of minors while serving there. Several were deceased and none were in active ministry.

In 2024, the priest Juan Carlos Garcia-Mendoza was indicted on ten counts of sexual abuse crimes. The diocese in 2023 had received a report from a teenager that Garcia-Mendoza had touch him inappropriately. The diocese notfified the Tennessee Department of Children's Services and started its own investigation. After pleading guilty to multiple counts of abuse against several victims, Garcia-Mendoza was sentenced to seven years in prison. He also requested that the Vatican laicize him.

== Bishops ==
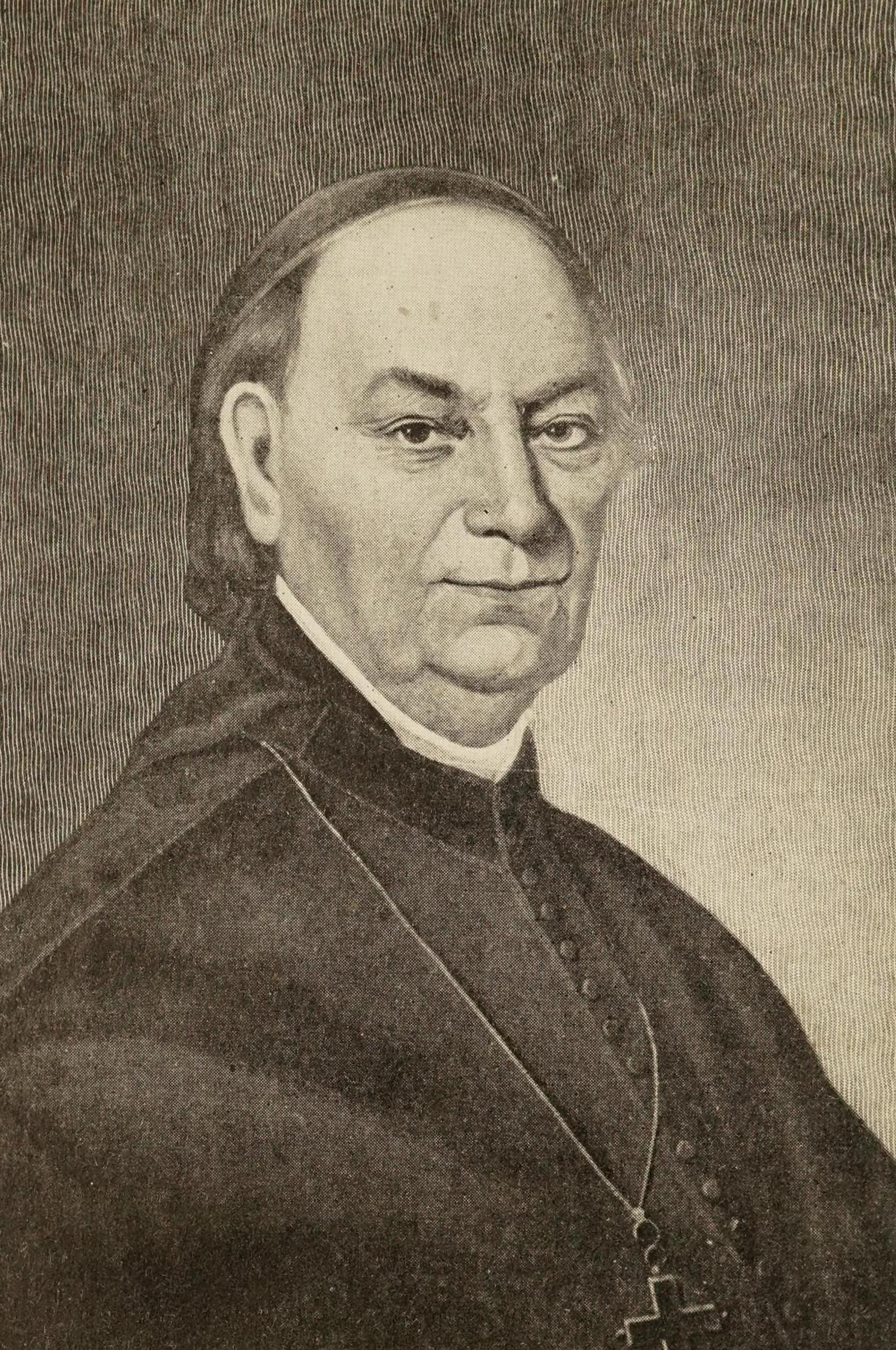
Bishop Miles

=== Bishops of Nashville ===
1. Richard Pius Miles (1837–1860)
2. James Whelan (1860–1864; coadjutor bishop 1859–1860)
3. Patrick Feehan (1865–1880), appointed Bishop and later Archbishop of Chicago
4. Joseph Rademacher (1883–1893), appointed Bishop of Fort Wayne
5. Thomas Sebastian Byrne (1894–1923)
6. Alphonse John Smith (1923–1935)
7. William Lawrence Adrian (1936–1969)
8. Joseph Aloysius Durick (1969–1975; coadjutor bishop 1963–1969)
9. James Daniel Niedergeses (1975–1992)
10. Edward Urban Kmiec (1992–2004), appointed Bishop of Buffalo
11. David Raymond Choby (2005–2017)
12. J. Mark Spalding (2018–present)

=== Other diocesan priests who became bishops ===
- Richard Scannell, appointed Bishop of Concordia in 1887 and later Bishop of Omaha
- John Baptist Morris, appointed Coadjutor Bishop (in 1906) and later Bishop of Little Rock
- John Patrick Farrelly, appointed Bishop of Cleveland in 1909
- Samuel Alphonsus Stritch, appointed Bishop of Toledo in 1921 and later Archbishop of Milwaukee, Archbishop of Chicago, and Pro-Prefect of the Sacred Congregation for the Propagation of the Faith (elevated to Cardinal in 1946)
- Fernand J. Cheri, appointed Auxiliary Bishop of New Orleans in 2015
- James Mark Beckman, appointed Bishop of Knoxville in 2024

== Education ==
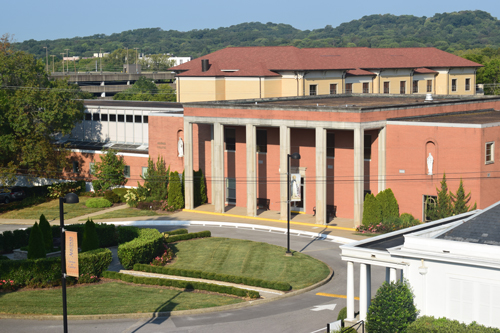
Aquinas College, Nashville

As of 2026, the Diocese of Nashville has four high schools and 17 elementary schools.

=== High schools ===
- Chesterton Academy of the Incarnation – Franklin
- Father Ryan High School – Nashville
- Pope Saint John Paul II Preparatory School – Hendersonville
- St. Cecilia Academy – Nashville

=== Colleges ===
Aquinas College – Nashville

== See also ==
- List of the Catholic dioceses of the United States
