= James Daniel Niedergeses =

American prelate

His Excellency, The Most Reverend James Daniel Niedergeses
- Bishop of Nashville
- Church: Roman Catholic Church
- See: Diocese of Nashville
- In office: May 20, 1975 to October 13, 1992
- Predecessor: Joseph Aloysius Durick
- Successor: Edward Urban Kmiec

Orders
- Ordination: April 8, 1975 by William Lawrence Adrian
- Consecration: May 20, 1975 by Amleto Giovanni Cicognani

Personal details
- Born: February 2, 1917 Lawrenceburg, Tennessee, US
- Died: November 16, 2007 (aged 90) Nashville, Tennessee, US
- Motto: Come Lord Jesus

James Daniel Niedergeses (February 2, 1917 – November 16, 2007) was an American prelate of the Roman Catholic Church. He served as the ninth bishop of the Diocese of Nashville in Tennessee from 1975 to 1992.

== Biography ==
=== Early life ===
James Niedergeses born on February 2, 1917, in Lawrenceburg, Tennessee. He was ordained to the priesthood for the Diocese of Nashville by Archbishop Joseph T McNicholas on May 20, 1944, in Cincinnati Niedergeses spent 11 years in Chattanooga, Tennessee, most of his time as pastor of Our Lady of Perpetual Help Parish.

=== Bishop of Nashville ===
On April 8, 1975, Pope Paul VI appointed Niedergeses as bishop of Nashville, He was consecrated by Archbishop Thomas J McDonough of Louisville on May 20, 1975.

Pope John Paul II accepted Niedergeses' resignation as bishop of Nashville on October 13, 1992. James Niedergeses died on November 16, 2007, at age 90 at Saint Thomas Hospital in Nashville.

== Episcopal succession ==
Catholic Church titles
Preceded by Joseph Aloysius Durick	Bishop of Nashville; 1975–1992	Succeeded by Edward Urban Kmiec
