= Edward Kmiec =

Catholic bishop (1936–2020)

His Excellency, The Most Reverend Bishop Edward Kmiec
- Bishop of Buffalo
- Church: Catholic Church
- Diocese: Diocese of Buffalo
- Appointed: August 12, 2004
- Installed: October 28, 2004
- Term ended: May 29, 2012
- Predecessor: Henry Joseph Mansell
- Successor: Richard Joseph Malone
- Previous posts: Auxiliary Bishop of Trenton; 1982 to 1992; Bishop of Nashville; 1992 to 2004

Orders
- Ordination: December 20, 1961 by Martin John O'Connor
- Consecration: November 3, 1982 by John C. Reiss, George W. Ahr, and James John Hogan

Personal details
- Born: June 4, 1936 Trenton, New Jersey, U.S.
- Died: July 11, 2020 (aged 84) Buffalo, New York, U.S.
- Denomination: Roman Catholic
- Motto: Charity and service

Styles of Edward Urban Kmiec
- Reference style: His Excellency; The Most Reverend
- Spoken style: Your Excellency
- Religious style: Bishop

Ordination history of Edward Kmiec
History
Episcopal consecration
- Consecrated by: John Charles Reiss
- Date: November 3, 1982
Episcopal succession
Bishops consecrated by Edward Kmiec as principal consecrator
- David Choby: February 27, 2006

Edward Urban Kmiec (/ˈkɪmɪk/, KIM-ik; June 4, 1936 – July 11, 2020) was an American prelate of the Roman Catholic Church. He served as the 13th bishop of the Diocese of Buffalo in New York State from 2004 to 2012.

Kmiec previously served as an auxiliary bishop for the Diocese of Trenton in New Jersey from 1982 to 1992 and as bishop of the Diocese of Nashville in Tennessee from 1992 to 2004

== Biography ==
Edward Kmiec was born in Trenton, New Jersey, on June 4, 1936. At age 25, Kmiec was ordained a priest for the Diocese of Trenton by Archbishop Martin O’Connor in Rome on December 20, 1961.

=== Auxiliary Bishop of Trenton ===
Pope John Paul II appointed Kmiec on August 26, 1982, as an auxiliary bishop of Trenton and titular bishop of Simidicca. He was consecrated at the Cathedral of St. Mary of the Assumption in Trenton, New Jersey, on November 3, 1982, by Bishop John C. Reiss.

=== Bishop of Nashville ===
John Paul II appointed Kmiec as bishop of Nashville on October 13, 1992; he was installed on December 3, 1992. He was heavily criticized for his diocese's handling of sexual abuse allegations, particularly those against Reverend Edward McKeown, who was convicted of raping a 12-year-old boy.

=== Bishop of Buffalo, New York ===
On August 12, 2004, Kmiec was appointed by John Paul II as bishop of Buffalo. He was installed on October 28, 2004. In 2007, Kmiec announced that the diocese had a balanced budget, after spending cuts reduced a $2.1 million deficit from the previous year.

In August 2009, the Buffalo News reported the removal of Monsignor Fred R. Voorhes, as administrator of St. Teresa's Parish in South Buffalo and the subsequent dismissal of Marc J. Pasquale, as business administrator and director of religious education at St. Teresa's. Parishioners expressed in interviews their discontent with these removals. Pasquale had gone to the Erie County District Attorney's Office prior to his dismissal to raise concerns about questionable financial practices.

Kmiec was heavily criticized for downsizing the diocese from 274 parishes and missions in 2005 to 170 in 2011. He also oversaw the closures of 25 elementary schools. The diocese under Kmiec ordained only 18 priests from 2004 to 2011.

=== Retirement and legacy ===
On May 29, 2012, Pope Benedict XVI accepted Kmiec's resignation as bishop of Buffalo. Bishop Richard Malone from the Diocese of Portland in Maine replaced him.

Edward Kmiec died in Buffalo on July 11, 2020, at age 84.

== See also ==
- Catholic Church hierarchy
- Catholic Church in the United States
- Historical list of the Catholic bishops of the United States
- List of Catholic bishops of the United States
- Lists of patriarchs, archbishops, and bishops

== Episcopal succession ==
Catholic Church titles
Preceded by Henry J. Mansell	Bishop of Buffalo; 2004–2012	Succeeded by Richard Joseph Malone
Preceded by James Daniel Niedergeses	Bishop of Nashville; 1992–2004	Succeeded by David Choby
