= Alphonse John Smith =

American prelate

His Excellency, The Most Reverend Alphonse John Smith S.T.D.
- Bishop of Nashville
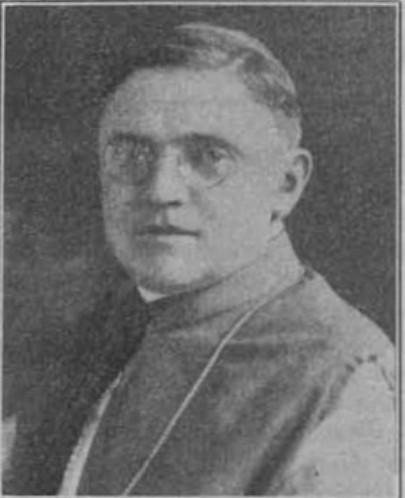
- Church: Catholic Church
- See: Diocese Nashville
- In office: December 23, 1923 – December 16, 1935
- Predecessor: Thomas Sebastian Byrne
- Successor: William Lawrence Adrian

Orders
- Ordination: April 18, 1908 by Pietro Respighi
- Consecration: March 25, 1924 by Joseph Chartrand

Personal details
- Born: November 14, 1883 Madison, Indiana, US
- Died: December 16, 1935 (aged 52) Nashville, Tennessee, US

Alphonse John Smith (November 14, 1883 – December 16, 1935) was an American prelate of the Catholic Church. He served as bishop of the Diocese of Nashville in Tennessee from 1923 to 1935.

== Biography ==
=== Early life ===
Alphonse Smith was born on November 14, 1883, in Madison, Indiana He was ordained a priest in Rome by Cardinal Pietro Respighi on April 18, 1908, for the Diocese of Indianapolis.

=== Bishop of Nashville ===
On December 23, 1923, Pope Pius XI named Smith as the sixth bishop of Nashville. He was consecrated on March 25, 1924, in the Cathedral of Saints Peter and Paul in Indianapolis by Bishop Joseph Chartrand. The co-consecrators were Bishops Emmanuel Ledvina and Samuel Stritch.

When Smith came to the diocese he found there were only a few native priests from the diocese itself and ten seminarians. He worked to change the situation and within two years the number of seminarians from Tennessee had grown to 60, and 26 priests were ordained for the diocese during his episcopate. The monastery of the Poor Clares was established in Memphis, Tennessee. Several new parishes and schools were also established.In 1925, he founded Father Ryan High School in Nashville.

=== Death ===
Alphonse Smith died in Nashville on December 16, 1935.

== Episcopal succession ==
Catholic Church titles
Preceded by Thomas Sebastian Byrne	Bishop of Nashville; 1923–1935	Succeeded by William Lawrence Adrian
