= Johann Baptist Alzog =

German theologian and Catholic church historian (1808–1878)

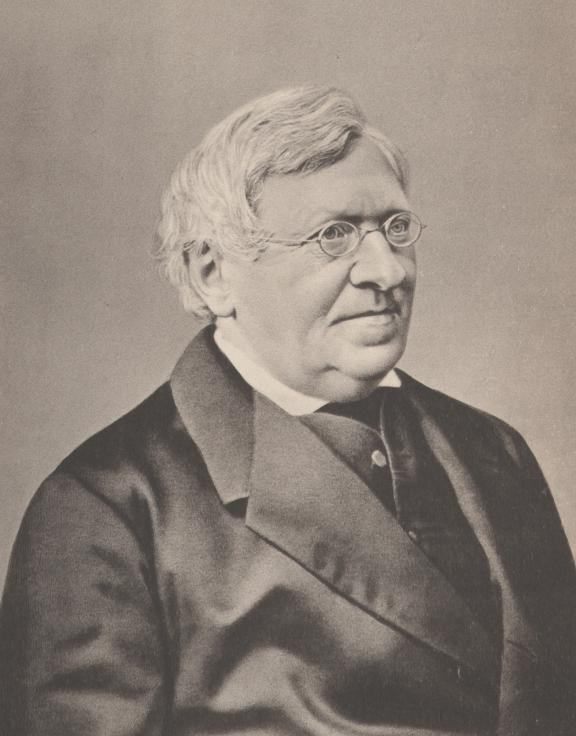
Johann Baptist Alzog

Johann Baptist Alzog (8 June 1808 – 1 March 1878) was a German theologian and Catholic church historian.

He was born at Ohlau, in Silesia. He studied at the universities of Breslau and Bonn and was ordained a priest at Cologne in 1834.

In the following year he accepted the chairs of exegesis and church history at the seminary of Posen. He defended with ardour the Archbishop of that city, Martin von Dunin, during his persecution by the Prussian government, became vicar-capitular, professor and regens at Hildesheim in 1845, and in 1853 was appointed to the chair of church history at the University of Freiburg (Breisgau); at the same time he was appointed an ecclesiastical councillor (geistlicher Rat). He held that post until his death at Freiburg.

Together with Ignaz von Döllinger, Alzog was instrumental in convoking the famous Munich assembly of Catholic scholars in 1863. He also took part, with Bishop Hefele and Bishop Haseberg, in the preparatory work of the First Vatican Council and voted in favor of the doctrine of Papal infallibility but against the opportuneness of its promulgation.

== Works ==
Alzog's fame rests mainly on his Handbuch der Universal-Kirchengeschichte (Mainz, 1841, often reprinted under various titles; English translation by Pabisch and Byrne, Manual of universal church history; 4 volumes, 1900). Based upon the foundations laid by Johann Adam Möhler, this manual was generally accepted as the best exposition of Catholic views, in opposition to the Protestant manual by C. A. Hase, and was translated into several languages.

His Patrology went through four editions (1866–84), and his edition of the Oratio Apologetica of St. Gregory of Nazianzus reached a second edition. He was also a frequent contributor to various periodicals. Besides a host of minor writings on ecclesiastical subjects, and an active collaboration in the great Kirchenlexicon of Wetzer and Welte, Alzog was also the author of Grundriss der Patrologie (Freiburg, 1866, 4th ed. 1888), a scholarly work; though now superseded. He also wrote (1857) a Latin treatise on the relation of Greek and Latin studies to Christian theology, and the valuable work: Die deutschen Plenarien im 15 und zu Anfang des 16 Jahrhunderts (Freiburg, 1874).
