= William Lawrence Adrian =

American prelate (1883–1972)

His Excellency, The Most Reverend William Lawrence Adrian
- Bishop of Nashville; Titular Bishop of Elo
- Church: Roman Catholic Church
- See: Diocese of Nashville
- In office: February 2, 1936 – September 4, 1969
- Predecessor: Alphonse John Smith
- Successor: Joseph Aloysius Durick

Orders
- Ordination: April 15, 1911 by Pietro Respighi
- Consecration: April 16, 1936 by Amleto Giovanni Cicognani

Personal details
- Born: April 16, 1883 Sigourney, Iowa, U.S.
- Died: February 13, 1972 (aged 88) Nashville, Tennessee, U.S.
- Education: St. Ambrose University; Pontifical North American College

William Lawrence Adrian (April 16, 1883 – February 13, 1972) was an American prelate of the Catholic Church. He served as bishop of the Diocese of Nashville in Tennessee from 1936 to 1969.

== Biography ==
=== Early life ===
William Adrian was born on April 16, 1883, in Sigourney, Iowa, to Nicholas and Mary (Paulus) Adrian. He earned a Bachelor of Arts degree from St. Ambrose College in Davenport, Iowa in 1906. He then studied at the Pontifical North American College in Rome.

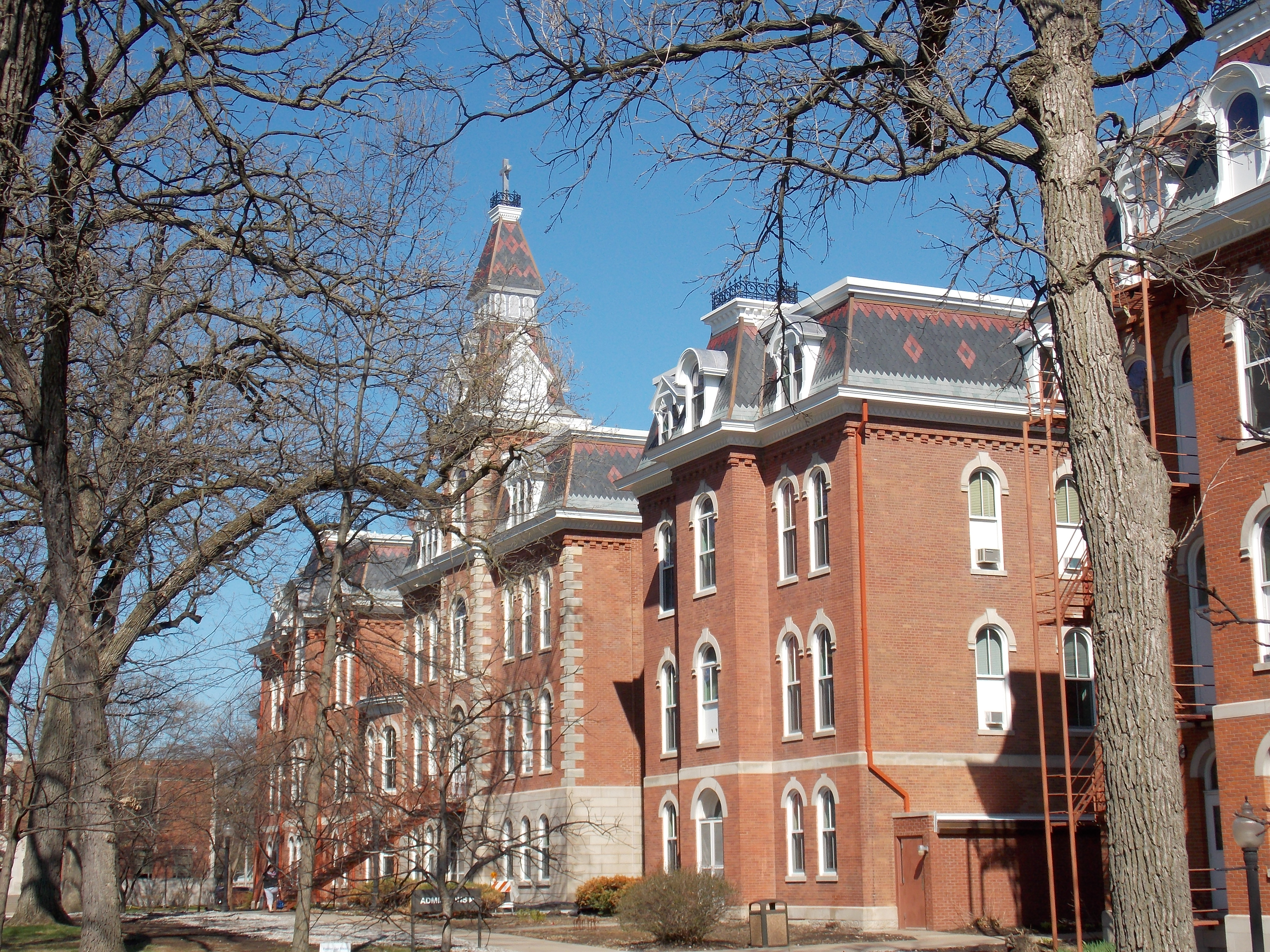
Saint Ambrose College, Davenport, Iowa (2014)

=== Priesthood ===
Adrian was ordained to the priesthood in Rome by Cardinal Pietro Respighi for the Diocese of Davenport on April 15, 1911. Following his return to the United States, he served as a professor at St. Ambrose College for twenty-four years and as its vice president from 1932 to 1935; Adrian also coached American football and baseball, and taught Latin and manual training. He became pastor of St. Bridget's Parish in Victor, Iowa in 1935.

=== Bishop of Nashville ===
On February 2, 1936, Adrian was appointed the seventh bishop of Nashville by Pope Pius XII. He learned of his appointment by a letter from the Holy See: "among [his] letters...With trembling fingers [he] opened it and read...and was so overwhelmed with wonder that [he] could read no farther." Adrian received his episcopal consecration on April 16, 1936, from Archbishop Amelto Cicognani at Sacred Heart Cathedral in Davenport, Iowa. Bishops Henry Rohlman and Moses E. Kiley served as co-consecrators.

Adrian, who became known as a "man who gets things done," oversaw the creation of several parishes, acquisition of a new episcopal residence in East Nashville, Tennessee, remodeling of the Cathedral, and establishment of a diocesan newspaper and the National Council of Catholic Women. In 1954, Adrian ordered the racial desegregation of all parochial schools in Nashville and Davidson County, far ahead of public school desegregation. He attended the Second Vatican Council in Rome from 1962 to 1965.

=== Retirement and death ===
On September 4, 1969, Pope Paul VI accepted Adrian's resignation as bishop of Nashville and named him titular bishop of Elo. Adrian resigned that post on January 13, 1971. William Adrian died in Nashville on February 13, 1972, at age 88.

== Episcopal succession ==
Catholic Church titles
Preceded by Alphonse John Smith	Bishop of Nashville; 1936–1969	Succeeded by Joseph Aloysius Durick
