= Richard Pius Miles =

American Catholic bishop (1791–1860)

The Right Reverend Richard Pius Miles OP
- Bishop of Nashville
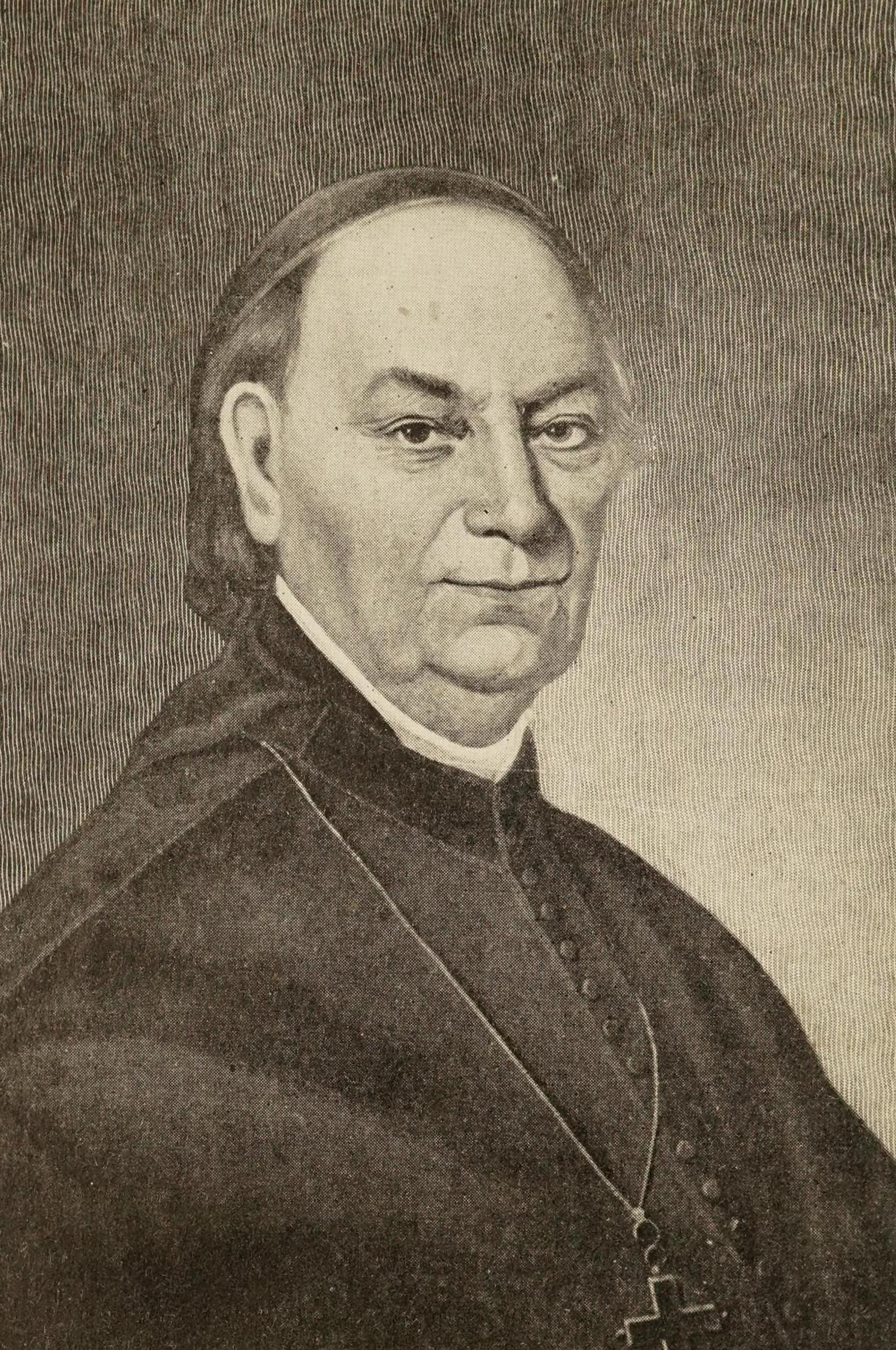
- Church: Catholic Church
- Diocese: Nashville
- Appointed: July 28, 1837
- Term ended: February 21, 1860
- Predecessor: Office established
- Successor: James Whelan

Orders
- Ordination: September 21, 1816 by Benedict Joseph Flaget
- Consecration: September 16, 1838 by Joseph Rosati

Personal details
- Born: May 17, 1791 Prince George's County, Maryland, U.S.
- Died: February 21, 1860 (aged 68) Nashville, Tennessee, U.S.
- Motto: In cruce salus (Latin for 'In the cross is salvation')

Richard Pius Miles OP (May 17, 1791 – February 21, 1860) was an American Catholic prelate who served as the first Bishop of Nashville from 1838 until his death in 1860.

== Early life ==
Richard Miles was born on May 17, 1791, in Prince George's County, Maryland. He was the son of Nicholas and Ann (née Blacklock) Miles. In the 1790 United States census, his father was noted as the owner of eight enslaved people. In his 1823 will, he bequeathed several slaves to his children, except Richard, to whom he gave $500 (equivalent to over $15,000 in 2025).

As a young child, Miles moved with his family to Nelson County, Kentucky. He received his early education from Dominican missionaries, and became one of the first students at St. Rose Priory when it opened in 1806. He received the Dominican habit in 1808 or 1809, at which time he took the name religious name Pius after the Dominican pope Pius V. He made his religious profession on May 13, 1810.

== Priesthood ==
On September 21, 1816, Miles was ordained to the priesthood by Bishop Benedict Joseph Flaget, the Bishop of Bardstown. He then taught at St. Thomas College, a preparatory school attached to St. Rose Priory. During this time, one of the students at St. Thomas was a young Jefferson Davis, the future president of the Confederate States. When the Dominican Sisters of St. Mary Magdalene were established in Kentucky in 1822, Miles served as their chaplain and spiritual director.

In 1828, Miles was made pastor of St. John the Baptist Church (now St. Thomas Aquinas Church) in Zanesville, Ohio. At the time, the parish covered all of Muskingum, Coshocton, Guernsey, and Noble counties with parts of Licking and Morgan counties. As pastor, Miles built a rectory, bell tower, and parochial school.

Miles then returned to Kentucky, serving as prior of St. Rose Priory (1833–1836). When his term expired, he became prior of St. Joseph Priory in Somerset, Ohio. In April 1837, he was elected provincial superior of the Province of St. Joseph, effectively becoming head of the Dominican Order in the United States.

== Bishop of Nashville ==
On July 28, 1837, Pope Gregory XVI erected the Diocese of Nashville and appointed Miles as its first bishop. It took months for the papal bulls to arrive in the United States, and this was followed by months of opposition from the Dominican Fathers, who wanted Miles to remain their provincial superior. As such, Miles did not receive his episcopal consecration until more than a year after his appointment. He was consecrated on September 16, 1838, by Bishop Joseph Rosati, with Bishops Simon Bruté and Guy Ignatius Chabrat serving as co-consecrators.

Until the erection of the Diocese of Memphis in 1970, the Diocese of Nashville covered the entire state of Tennessee. When Miles arrived in Tennessee in 1838, he conducted a visitation on horseback and found no more than 300 Catholics scattered across the state. In a March 1840 pastoral letter, Miles wrote:

We cannot, however, conceal from our own heart that, whilst we have been sometimes consoled and edified, we have yet had more cause for grief than joy since our elevation to the Episcopal dignity. Unable for an entire year to procure the assistance of one useful priest; having no church in which to offer with decency the mysteries of our holy religion; obliged to peril our own health by attending distant missions; and still anxious to succeed in preparing our church, and organizing our flock in our Episcopal See, we would have sunk under the weight of our cares and labors, were we not sustained by the merciful Providence of God.

In November 1842, Miles ordained Father John O'Dowd, the first Catholic priest ordained in Tennessee. For his cathedral, Miles originally used Holy Rosary Church, then the only Catholic church in Nashville, which stood on a site now occupied by the Tennessee State Capitol. In 1843, after Nashville was named the state capital, Miles began construction on a new cathedral. He laid the cornerstone of the Cathedral of the Blessed Virgin of the Seven Sorrows on June 6, 1844, and dedicated it on October 31, 1847.

As his health began to decline, Miles received his fellow Dominican, James Whelan, as a coadjutor bishop in May 1859. By the time of his death nine months later, the Diocese of Nashville contained 13 priests, 14 churches, and nine parochial schools to serve a Catholic population of 12,000.

== Death and legacy ==
Miles died in Nashville on February 21, 1860, at the age of 68.

He was initially interred under the altar of the cathedral. During renovations in July 1969, 109 years after his death, Miles's body was exhumed and found to be incorrupt. He was then reinterred in a smaller chapel within the church.

== Sources ==
- O'Daniel, Victor F. (1926). The Father of the Church in Tennessee.

Catholic Church titles
Preceded by none	Bishop of Nashville; 1838–1860	Succeeded by James Whelan
