= J. Mark Spalding =

American Roman Catholic bishop (born 1965)

His Excellency, The Most Reverend J. Mark Spalding DD, JCL
- Bishop of Nashville
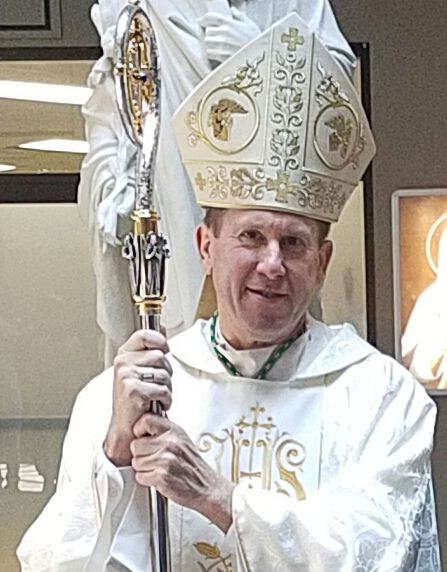
- Spalding in 2019
- Diocese: Nashville
- Appointed: November 21, 2017
- Installed: February 2, 2018
- Predecessor: David Choby
- Previous posts: Vicar General, Archdiocese of Louisville (2011–2018)

Orders
- Ordination: August 3, 1991 by Thomas C. Kelly, O.P
- Consecration: February 2, 2018 by Joseph Edward Kurtz, Charles C. Thompson, and William Medley

Personal details
- Born: Joseph Mark Spalding; January 13, 1965 (age 61) Lebanon, Kentucky, US
- Denomination: Catholic
- Residence: Nashville, Tennessee, US
- Parents: Joseph Lawrence and Mary Aileen (née Thompson) Spalding
- Education: Saint Meinrad Seminary and School of Theology; Catholic University of Louvain
- Motto: God has lifted up the lowly (from Luke 1:52)

Styles of J. Mark Spalding
- Reference style: His Excellency; The Most Reverend
- Spoken style: Your Excellency
- Religious style: Bishop

Joseph Mark Spalding (born January 13, 1965) is an American Catholic prelate who serves as Bishop of Nashville.

Born in Lebanon, Kentucky, Spalding studied at Saint Meinrad Seminary and School of Theology and Catholic University of Louvain in Belgium. He became an ordained priest in 1991 and served as an associate pastor for the Archdiocese of Louisville at the Basilica of St. Joseph Proto-Cathedral in Bardstown, Kentucky.

Between 1992 and 2017, Spalding served in pastoral positions at parishes in Bardstown, Louisville, and La Grange. In 1998, Archbishop Thomas C. Kelly appointed Spalding to additional positions, judicial vicar and director of the metropolitan tribunal. Archbishop Joseph Edward Kurtz in 2011 appointed Spalding as vicar general. Pope Francis appointed Spalding as the bishop of Nashville in November 2017, and he was consecrated in February 2018.

== Biography ==
=== Early life ===
Spalding was born on January 13, 1965, in Lebanon, Kentucky, and grew up on the family farm in Washington County, Kentucky. His family has roots in the earliest Catholic presence west of the Appalachian Mountains. His ancestors include Archbishop Martin Spalding, John Lancaster Spalding and Mother Catherine Spalding.

Spalding graduated from Bethlehem High School in Bardstown, Kentucky, in 1983. After finishing high school, Spalding decided to become a priest. He entered the Saint Meinrad Seminary and School of Theology in St. Meinrad, Indiana, where he received a Bachelor of Arts degree in history in 1987. Spalding attended the Catholic University of Louvain in Leuven, Belgium; he earned a master's degree and a Bachelor of Sacred Theology degree there in 1990.

=== Priesthood ===
Spalding was ordained to the priesthood on August 3, 1991, for the Archdiocese of Louisville at the Basilica of St. Joseph Proto-Cathedral by Archbishop Thomas C. Kelly. After his ordination, Spalding returned to Louvain to study for a Licentiate of Canon Law.

After Spalding returned to Louisville in 1992, the archdiocese assigned him as an associate pastor at the Basilica. He also became a chaplain at Bethlehem High School. The next year, he was also named as a part-time judge for the metropolitan tribunal and in 1995 as an adjutant judicial vicar. In 1996, the archdiocese transferred Spalding from the Basilica to St. Augustine Parish in Lebanon to serve as associate pastor.

In 1998, Archbishop Thomas Kelly appointed Spalding as judicial vicar and director of the metropolitan tribunal. He was also moved from St. Augustine to a part-time position as associate pastor at St. Margaret Mary Parish in Louisville. In 1999, Spalding became pastor of Immaculate Conception Parish in La Grange, Kentucky. He would remain at Immaculate Conception for the next 12 years.

Bishop Joseph Kurtz in 2011 appointed Spalding as vicar general and pastor of Holy Trinity Parish in Louisville that year. Spalding gave up his roles as judicial vicar and pastor of Immaculate Conception. In 2016, the archdiocese additionally assigned him as pastor of Holy Name Parish in Louisville.

=== Bishop of Nashville ===
Pope Francis appointed Spalding on November 21, 2017, as the twelfth bishop of Nashville. He was consecrated on February 2, 2018. by Archbishop Joseph Edward Kurtz, with Archbishop Christophe Pierre and Cardinal Justin Rigali serving as co-consecrators.

In November 2018, Spalding released a list of 13 diocesan clerics with credible accusations of sexual abuse of minors who served in Tennessee from the 1940s through the 1990s.

Spalding, in January 2024, removed Juan Carlos Garcia from his position at St. Philip Parish in Franklin, Tennessee, pending investigation. A teenager in November 2023 had accused Garcia of inappropriate touching.

== See also ==
- Catholic Church hierarchy
- Catholic Church in the United States
- Historical list of the Catholic bishops of the United States
- List of Catholic bishops of the United States
- Lists of patriarchs, archbishops, and bishops

== Episcopal succession ==
Catholic Church titles
Preceded by David Choby	Bishop of Nashville; 2018–present	Succeeded by Incumbent
