= Joseph Aloysius Durick =

American prelate

His Excellency, The Most Reverend Joseph Aloysius Durick
- Bishop of Nashville; Titular Bishop of Cerbali
- Church: Roman Catholic Church
- See: Diocese of Nashville
- Predecessor: William Lawrence Adrian
- Successor: James Daniel Niedergeses
- Previous posts: Auxiliary Bishop of Mobile-Birmingham (1954 to 1963); Coadjutor Bishop of Nashville (1963 to 1969); Titular Bishop of Cerbali

Orders
- Ordination: March 23, 1940 by James Gibbons
- Consecration: March 24, 1955 by Thomas Joseph Toolen

Personal details
- Born: October 13, 1914 Dayton, Tennessee, US
- Died: June 26, 1994 (aged 79) Bessemer, Alabama, US
- Education: St. Mary's Seminary and University; Pontifical Urban University
- Motto: Caritas Christi urget nos (The love of Christ impels us)

Joseph Aloysius Durick (October 13, 1914 – June 26, 1994) was an American prelate of the Roman Catholic Church. He served as bishop of the Diocese of Nashville in Tennessee from 1969 to 1975. He previously served as an auxiliary bishop of the Archdiocese of Mobile-Birmingham in Alabama from 1954 to 1963 and as coadjutor bishop of Nashville from 1963 to 1969.

Durick publicly opposed United States participation in the Vietnam War and the death penalty, which led to criticism from conservative circles. Durick also directed efforts at ecumenical cooperation with Protestant and Jewish communities in Tennessee, as well as introducing Project Equality. He had the image of an amiable country vicar, so much so that the newspapers called him "the happy priest".

== Biography ==
=== Early life ===
Joseph Durick was born on October 13, 1914, in Dayton, Tennessee, the seventh of twelve children. He grew up in Bessemer, Alabama, during the height of anti-Catholic violence in that state.

After deciding not to pursue a music career, Durick began studies for the priesthood. He entered St. Bernard College in Cullman, Alabama, graduating in 1933. In 1936, he completed coursework in philosophy at St. Mary's Seminary and University in Baltimore, Maryland. He later received a degree in theology from the Pontifical Urbaniana University in Rome.

=== Priesthood ===
Durick was ordained in Rome by Cardinal James Gibbons for the Archdiocese of Mobile on March 23, 1940. Durick soon became the assistant director of Catholic missions in North Alabama; by 1943 he was the director.

=== Auxiliary Bishop of Mobile-Birmingham ===
On December 30, 1954, Pope Pius XII appointed Durick as an auxiliary bishop of Mobile-Birmingham and titular bishop of Cerbali. He was consecrated at the St. Paul Co-Cathedral in Birmingham, Alabama. on March 24, 1955, by Archbishop Thomas Joseph Toolen. Durick's episcopal motto was "The love of Christ impels us" (Caritas Christi urget nos). At age 40, he was one of the youngest American bishops.

On April 12, 1963, Durick signed the open letter A Call for Unity, urging African Americans to withdraw their support of Martin Luther King Jr. and pursue equality via the legal system rather than protests. King responded in his April 16th "Letter from Birmingham Jail."

=== Coadjutor Bishop and Bishop of Nashville ===
On December 11, 1963, Pope Paul VI appointed Durick as coadjutor bishop of Nashville with right of succession to Bishop William Adrian. Durick was installed on March 3, 1964.

On September 10, 1969, Durick succeeded Adrian as bishop of Nashville. Durick was inspired to lead the Catholic Church in Tennessee into a new era by the reforms initiated by Pope John XXIII in the Second Vatican Council. To help present his reforms, Durick consulted with Catholic laymen, as well as a number of journalists including John Popham, John Seigenthaler, Joe Sweat, and Reverend Owen Campion.

=== Resignation and legacy ===
On April 2, 1975, Paul VI accepted Durick's resignation as bishop of Nashville. He spent the next six years working in prison ministry. He was then forced to semi-retire due to a severe heart problem and underwent cardiac surgery. Joseph Durick died of cancer on July 26, 1994, at age 79 at his home in Bessemer.

== Sources ==
- S. Jonathan Bass (2001). Blessed are the Peacemakers. Louisiana State University Press.

== Episcopal succession ==
Catholic Church titles
Preceded by William Lawrence Adrian	Bishop of Nashville; 1969–1975	Succeeded by James Daniel Niedergeses
