= St. Mary's Catholic Church (Nashville, Tennessee) =

Historic church in Tennessee, United States

- U.S. National Register of Historic Places
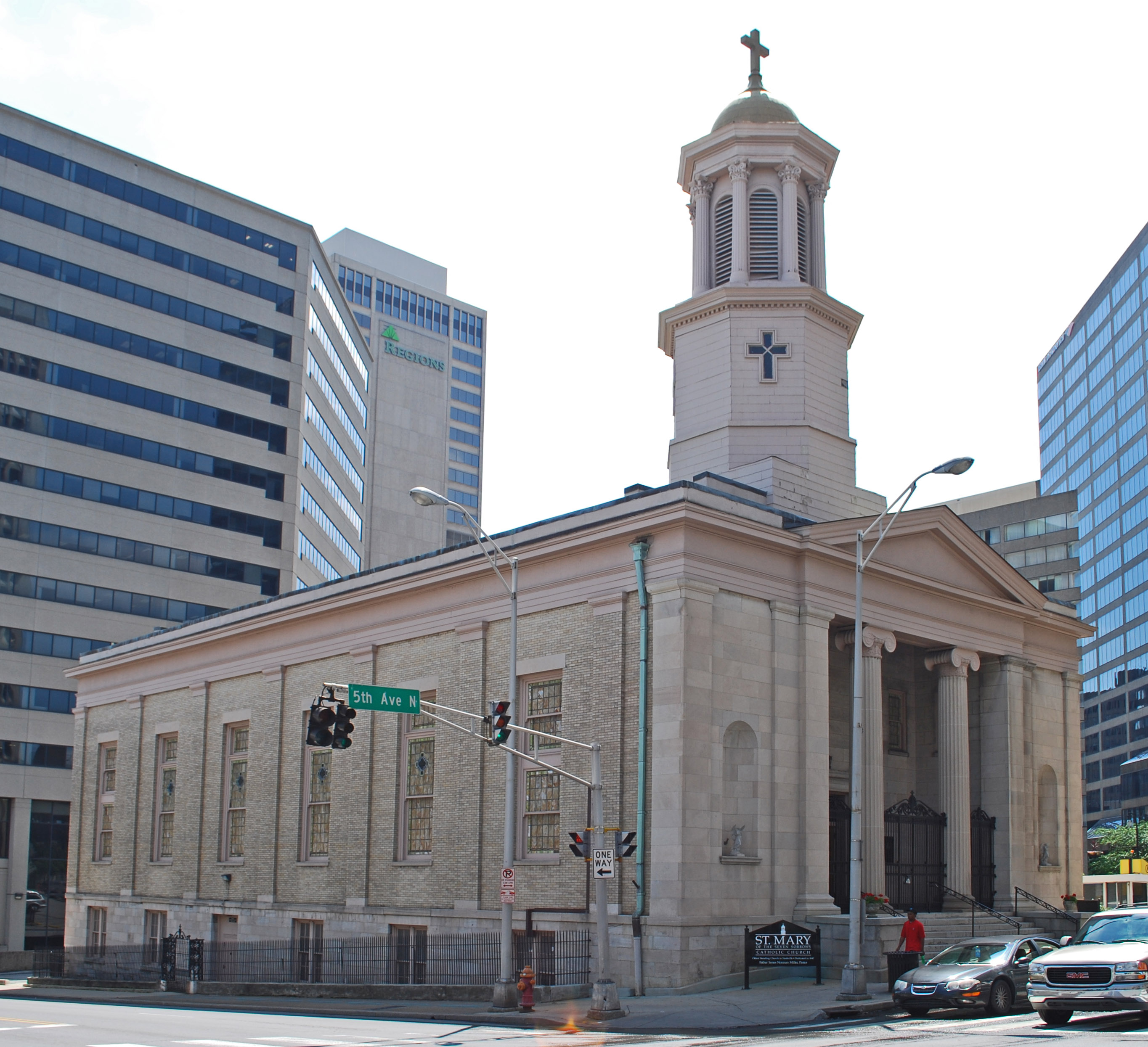

- Location within Tennessee Location within the United States
- Location: 330 5th Ave., N., Nashville, Tennessee
- Coordinates: 36°9′57″N 86°46′53″W
- Area: 1 acre (0.40 ha)
- Built: 1845
- Architect: William Strickland
- Architectural style: Greek Revival
- NRHP reference No.: 70000609
- Added to NRHP: July 08, 1970

St. Mary of the Seven Sorrows Church (commonly St. Mary's Catholic Church and formerly the Cathedral of the Blessed Virgin of the Seven Sorrows) is an historic Catholic parish in downtown Nashville, Tennessee, United States. Its church on the corner of Charlotte Avenue and 5th Avenue in Nashville, Tennessee, built in 1845, is the oldest extant church in Nashville and the oldest Catholic church in what is now the Diocese of Nashville. St. Mary replaced the diocese's first church, Holy Rosary, which had been erected previously on the site today occupied by the Tennessee State Capitol.

The church was designed by Adolphus Heiman (1809–1862), who also designed a number of other notable Nashville buildings, including the State Asylum and the Italianate-style Belmont Mansion. The late antebellum Greek Revival structure features a gabled front entrance of two fluted Ionic order columns supporting a classical pediment. The cornerstone was laid in 1844, not long after the erection of the diocese in 1837; construction was delayed, however, by lack of funds. It was dedicated on October 31, 1847. Richard Pius Miles, the first Bishop of Nashville, was the driving force behind its construction, and he is now buried there.

In December 1864, during the Battle of Nashville in the American Civil War, the church served as a hospital for wounded Union and Confederate soldiers. St. Mary's remained the cathedral until 1914, when the episcopal see was moved to the Cathedral of the Incarnation.

The church was added to the National Register of Historic Places in 1970.

== See also ==
- List of Catholic cathedrals in the United States
- List of cathedrals in the United States
