= Patrick Feehan =

Irish-born American Catholic archbishop (1829-1902)

His Excellency, The Most Reverend Patrick A. Feehan
- Archbishop of Chicago
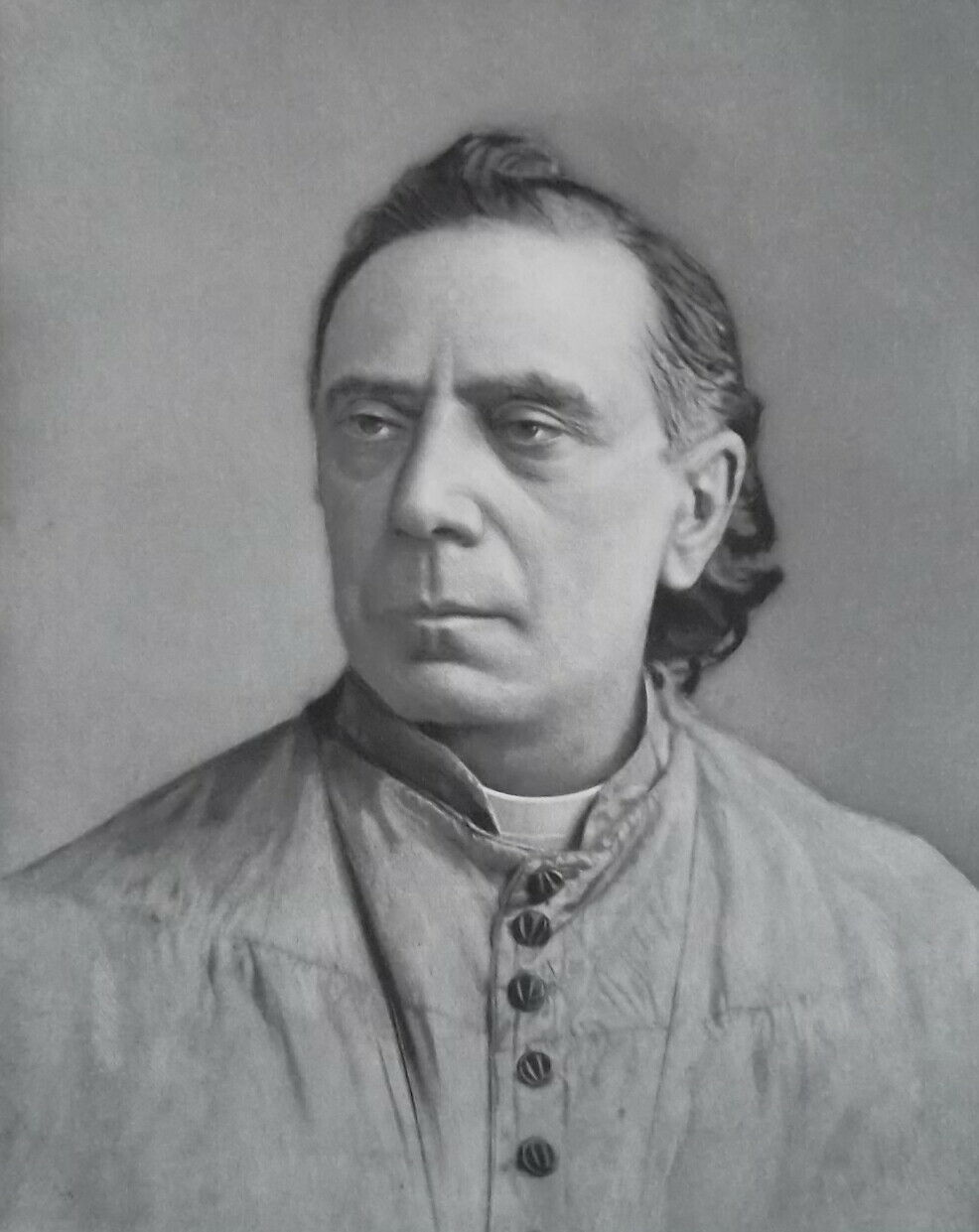
- Church: Roman Catholic Church
- See: Chicago
- In office: September 10, 1880 – July 12, 1902
- Predecessor: James Duggan
- Successor: James Edward Quigley
- Previous post: Bishop of Nashville (1865 to 1880)

Orders
- Ordination: November 1, 1852 by Peter Richard Kenrick
- Consecration: November 12, 1865 by Peter Richard Kenrick

Personal details
- Born: August 28, 1829 Killenaule, Tipperary, Ireland
- Died: July 12, 1902 (aged 72) Chicago, Illinois, US
- Education: St Patrick's College, Maynooth
- Motto: Eia advocata nostra (Here is our advocate)
- Coat of arms

Patrick Augustine Feehan (August 28, 1829 – July 12, 1902), was an Irish-born American Catholic prelate who served as the first archbishop of Chicago in Illinois from 1880 until his death in 1902. He previously served as bishop of Nashville in Tennessee from 1865 to 1880.

== Biography ==
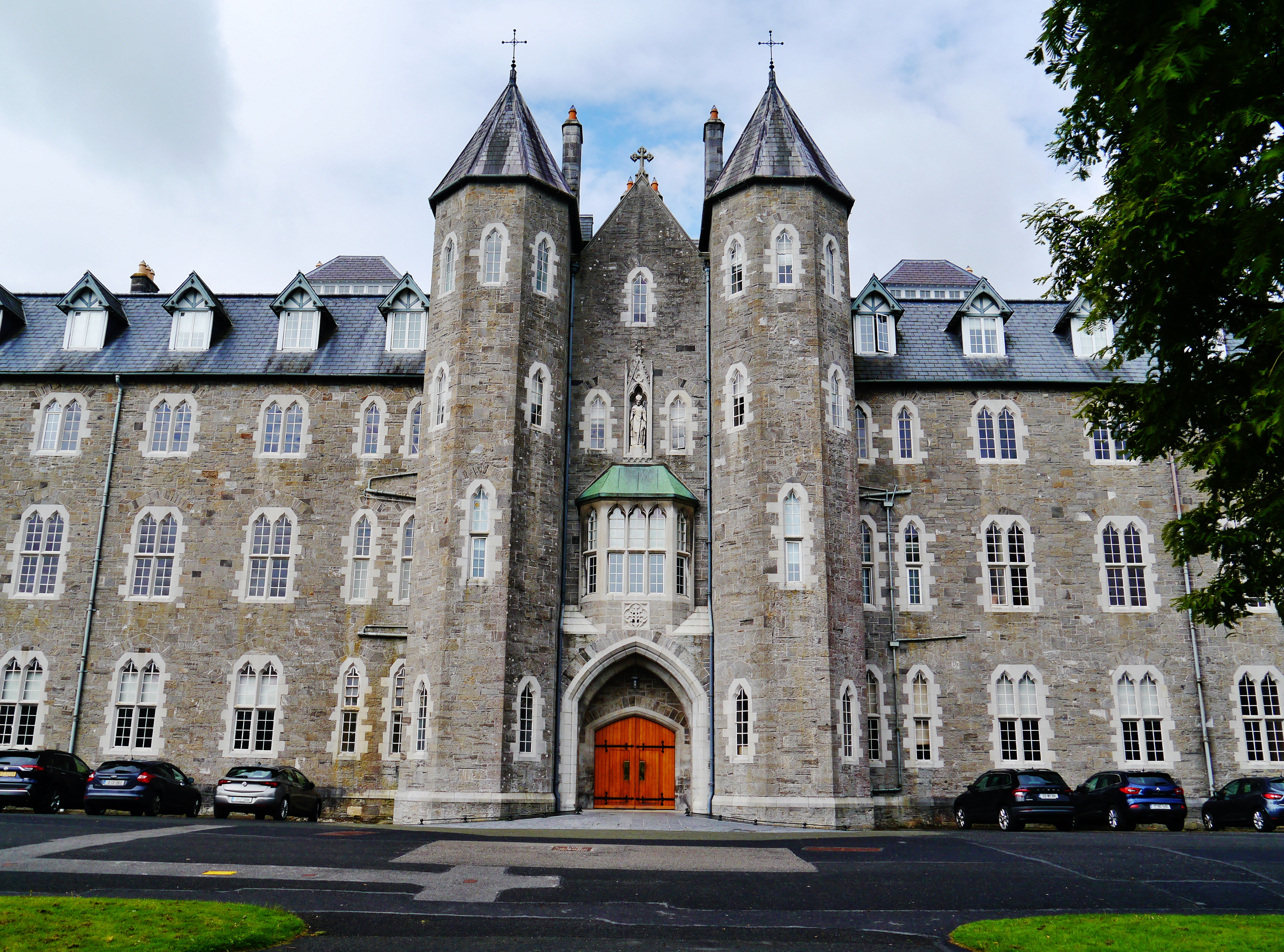
St. Patrick's College, Maynooth, Ireland (2022)

=== Early life ===
Patrick Feehan was born on August 28, 1829, in Killenaule, County Tipperary, in Ireland, to Patrick and Judith (Cooney) Feehan. His father was a gentleman farmer. At age ten, Feehan was sent to live with his paternal grandfather to attend school in Fethard. He returned to Killenaule two years later when a school opened there. Feehan learned to speak French fluently and was a dedicated reader. At age 14 he started studying Gaelic.

In 1845, at age 16, Feehan entered Castleknock College in Dublin as an ecclesiastic student, where he befriended the future Irish statesman Charles Russell. By that point, Feehan knew that he wanted to become a priestIn January 1847, Feehan started his studies for the priesthood at St Patrick's College in Maynooth, the major seminary in Ireland. In 1850, his family emigrated to the United States, sailing from Dublin.

Archbishop Peter Kenrick of the Archdiocese of St. Louis in the United States had opened the Carondelet Seminary, a major seminary in St. Louis, Missouri. While in Ireland, he recruited Feehan to come to his archdiocese. Although Feehan was on track to become a professor at St. Patrick, the college agreed to his departure. In 1852, Feehan left for the United States.

=== Priesthood ===
Feehan was ordained a priest in St. Louis for the Archdiocese of St. Louis by Kenrick on November 1, 1852. After his ordination, Kenrick assigned Feehan to teach at the diocesan seminary. In July 1853, he was assigned to St. John's Parish in St. Louis.

During a cholera epidemic in St. Louis that year, Feehan spent many hours tending the sick and blessing the dead. He volunteered to place the dead in coffins. On another occasion, Feehan encountered a young girl with smallpox who had been abandoned by her relatives. He found a woman who already had that disease to foster the child.

In 1854, Feehan was appointed president of Carondelet Seminary. He was also assigned to serve as chaplain to the Sisters of St. Joseph at their convent on the seminary property. In 1858, Feehan was appointed pastor of St. Michael's Parish in St. Louis. In 1859, he became pastor of Immaculate Conception Parish in St. Louis. He established a chapter of the Society of Saint Vincent de Paul to aid the poor. He would personally visit all the poor and the sick in the parish. While visiting the jail, he encountered a man who had broken into the Immaculate Conception rectory and stole a watch and money from Feehan. The inmate expressed his remorse and said that he want to move west to find a job. Feehan gave him $50. Two years later, the man sent Feehan a check for $75 and his thanks.

During the American Civil War, the Sisters of Charity were put in charge of a military hospital in St. Louis, where Feehan spent long hours comforting the sick and wounded. After the Battle of Shiloh in Tennessee on April 6 to 7, 1862, boatloads of wounded Union Army soldiers arrived in St. Louis. For three straight days, Feehan moved along the wharf and the stretchers laid in rows on the street, administering last rites to dying soldiers. Some of them were Protestants who requested baptism before they died.

=== Bishop of Nashville ===
Feehan was appointed bishop of Nashville by Pope Pius IX on June 7, 1865. Feehan at first declined the appointment, wanting to tend to his elderly mother, but accepted it after she died. He was consecrated bishop at the Cathedral of Saint Louis in St. Louis, Missouri, by Kenrick on November 12, 1865. At that time, the Diocese of Nashville included the entire State of Tennessee.

The civil war had ended only a couple of weeks before Feehan's consecration and Tennessee was still under occupation by the Union Army. The cathedral and the bishop's residence were in bad shape, having been used for billeting soldiers during the war. The diocese had only three priests.Feehan rehabilitated St. Cecilia's Convent, the home of the Dominican Sisters in Nashville. In 1866, he brought the Sisters of Charity to the city, where they opened St. Bernard's Academy for girls in the mansion of the former governor. During the summer and fall of 1866, he worked to relieve the suffering of victims of a cholera outbreak in Nashville.

In October 1866, Feehan traveled to Baltimore, Maryland, to participate in the Second Plenary Council of Baltimore, a meeting of bishops in the American church to discuss rules and policies. The diocese was hard hit by bank closures and the depression of 1873. During a sermon in 1877, Feehan warned Catholic men against joined secular fraternal orders. His speech encouraged a group of Catholic men to create the Catholic Knights of America, which would eventually provide affordable life insurance to poor working men across the country. In 1877 and 1878, the diocese suffered yellow fever outbreaks, resulting in the deaths of 13 religious sisters and nine priests, including the vicar general.

=== Archbishop of Chicago ===
On September 10, 1880, Feehan was appointed as the first archbishop of the new Archdiocese of Chicago by Pope Leo XIII. He was greeted by several thousand people when he arrived in the city in November 1880.

From 1880 to 1902, the Catholic population of Chicago nearly quadrupled, to 800,000, largely due to the arrival of immigrants. In adding to the Irish and German communities already established, Polish, Bohemian, French, Lithuanian, Italian, Croatian, Slovak and Dutch Catholics brought their own languages and cultural traditions. Feehan preferred to keep a low profile; relatively few speeches and sermons exist from his 22-year tenure.

Chicago was still feeling the effects of the Great Fire of 1871, which destroyed many of the schools and churches. Feehan accommodated these diverse needs by creating national parishes to serve ethnic communities and recruited religious orders from their home countries to staff them. Of the 140 parishes he founded, 52 percent were national parishes. According to Reverend Martin Zielinski, an associate professor of Catholic history at Mundelein Seminary, the parishes provided a place where immigrants could find familiar fraternal organizations, music, and language. They served as a haven from xenophobia and hostility directed toward immigrants and Catholics.

Epidemics of cholera and yellow fever in Chicago left dozens of orphans. In 1881, Feehan established the St. Vincent Orphan Asylum, and in 1883 St. Mary's Training School for Boys, a trade school for homeless boys, now known as Maryville Academy. This was followed in 1887 with St. Paul's Home for Working Boys, now known as Mercy Home.

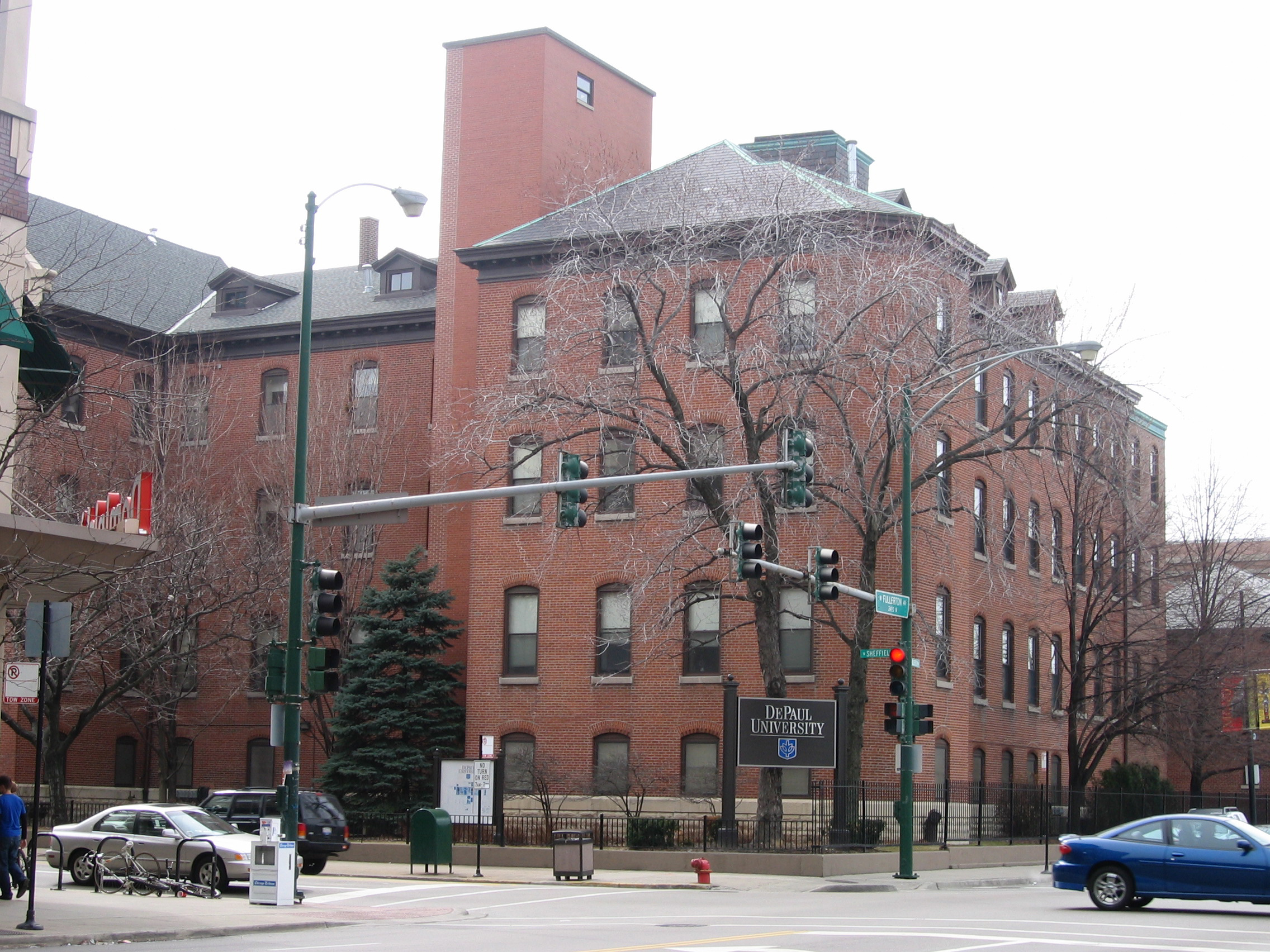
DePaul University, Chicago, Illinois (2006)

Feehan was a strong supporter of Catholic education, and promoted it at the exhibition at the 1893 World's Columbian Exposition in Chicago "Archbishop Feehan believed a strong system of Catholic education would solve the problem of inconsistent religious instruction at home, and unify a rapidly diversifying Catholic America." He also dedicated St. Vincent's Church in 1897 to begin St. Vincent's College by 1898, which is today DePaul University.

=== Death and legacy ===
Patrick Feehan died on July 12, 1902, in Chicago. The Chicago Tribune praised his "diplomatic handling" of all the ethnic groups in the diocese.

== Notes ==
Catholic Church titles
Preceded by Bishop James Duggan	Archbishop of Chicago; 1880–1902	Succeeded by Archbishop James Edward Quigley
Preceded by James Whelan	Bishop of Nashville; 1865–1880	Succeeded by Joseph Rademacher
