= Cathedral of the Incarnation (Nashville, Tennessee) =

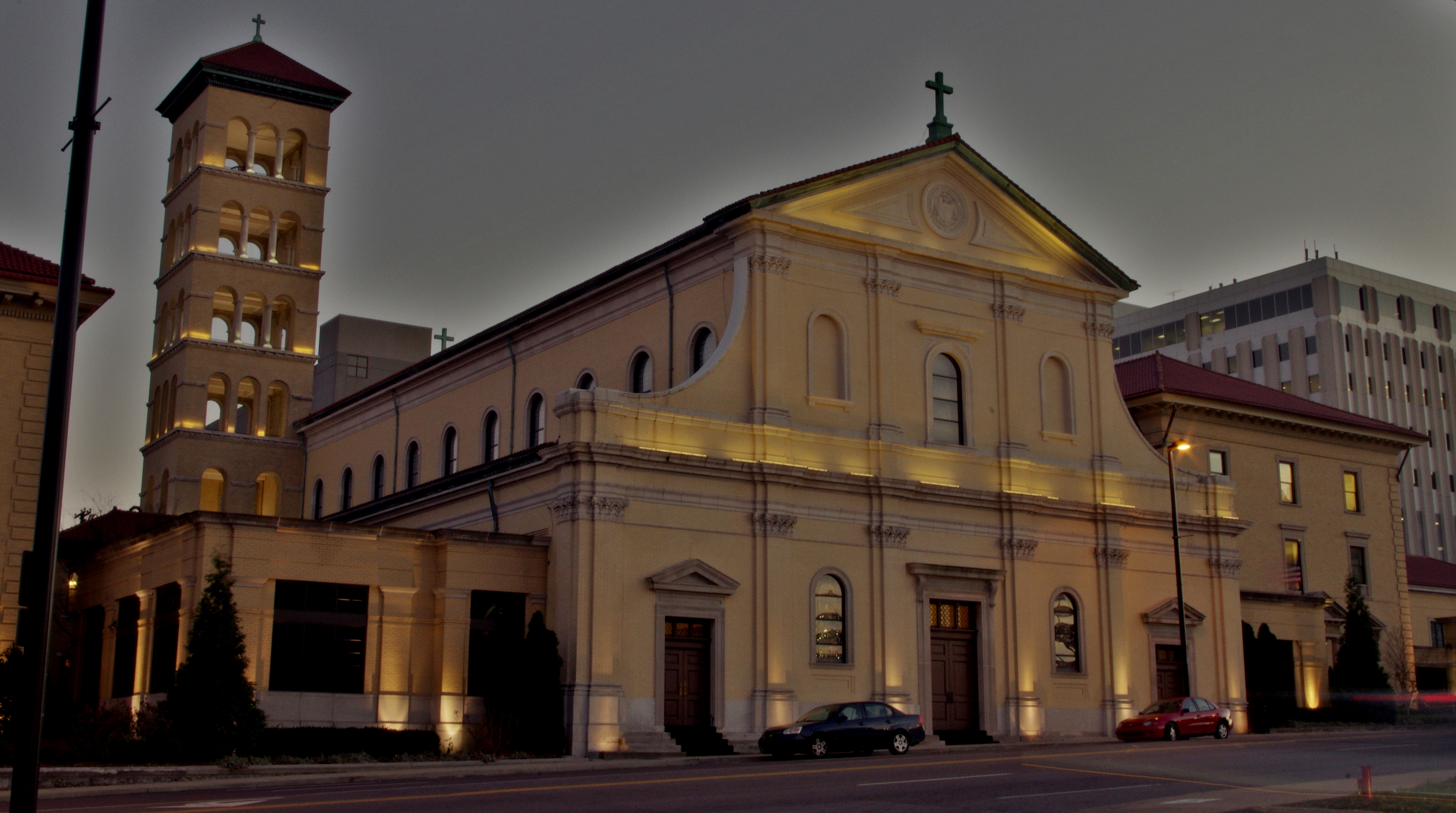
- The cathedral in 2013

- Location within Tennessee Location within the United States
- 36°9′2.88″N 86°47′58.56″W
- Location: 2015 West End Ave. Nashville, Tennessee
- Country: United States
- Denomination: Roman Catholic
- Website: cathedralnashville.org

History
- Status: Cathedral
- Dedication: Incarnation
- Consecrated: 1914

Architecture
- Architect: Fred Asmus
- Style: Italianate
- Groundbreaking: 1907
- Completed: 1914

Specifications
- Materials: Limestone

Administration
- Diocese: Diocese of Nashville

Clergy
- Bishop: J. Mark Spalding
- Rector: Fr. John Hammond

The Cathedral of the Incarnation, located at 2015 West End Avenue in Nashville, Tennessee, in the United States, is the cathedral seat of the Roman Catholic Diocese of Nashville.

== History ==
During the second half of the 19th century, the Diocese of Nashville was served by the Cathedral of Saint Mary of the Seven Sorrows, dedicated in 1845.By the beginning of the 20th century, Saint Mary's had become inadequate to serve the growing diocese's needs.

In 1902, Bishop Thomas Sebastian Byrne purchased a property near Vanderbilt University for a new cathedral. Construction of a rectory was completed in 1908 and then the cathedral school was finished.Byrne hired the architect Fred Asmus of Nashville to design the building. The Basilica of San Martino ai Monti in Rome inspired the design of the cathedral itself. However, Asmus copied the bell tower from the Basilica of San Lorenzo in Damaso in Rome.

Construction of the cathedral started in 1910. The diocese used the first floor of the school for masses while the cathedral was being built. It was completed in early 1914.

The Cathedral of the Incarnation was dedicated on July 26, 1914. In 1937, Bishop William L. Adrian replaced the existing windows with painted art glass, enlarged the sanctuary and replaced the flooring with a composite material. The interior was renovated again in 1987, with another extension of the sanctuary by10 feet (3.0 m), the installation of prismatic glass windows, a repainting, and the replacement of the composite flooring with tile.

In March 2019, the diocese began a major renovation of the cathedral interior. The project included repainting walls and restoring moldings.

Cathedral images

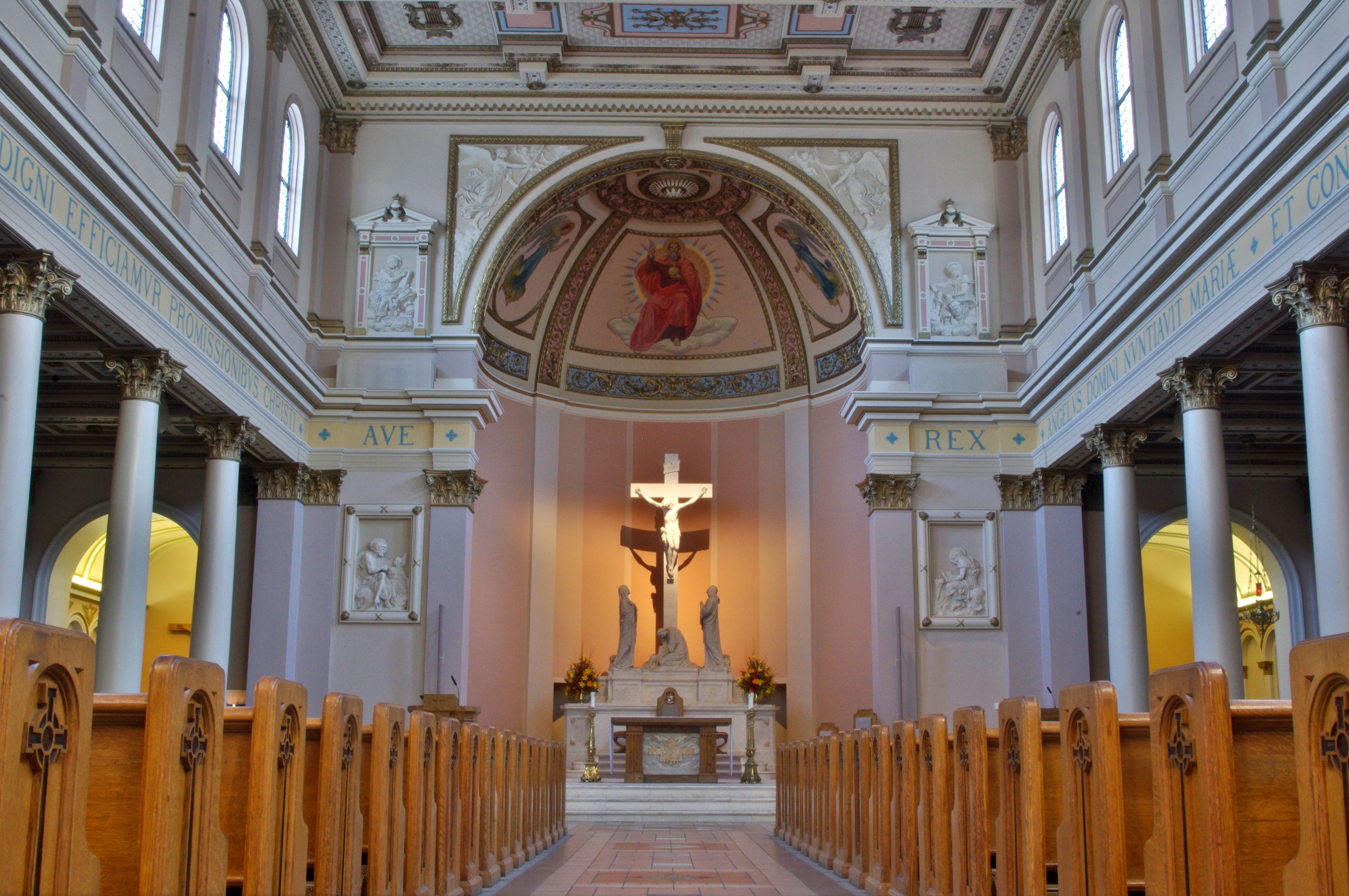
Main altar (2013)

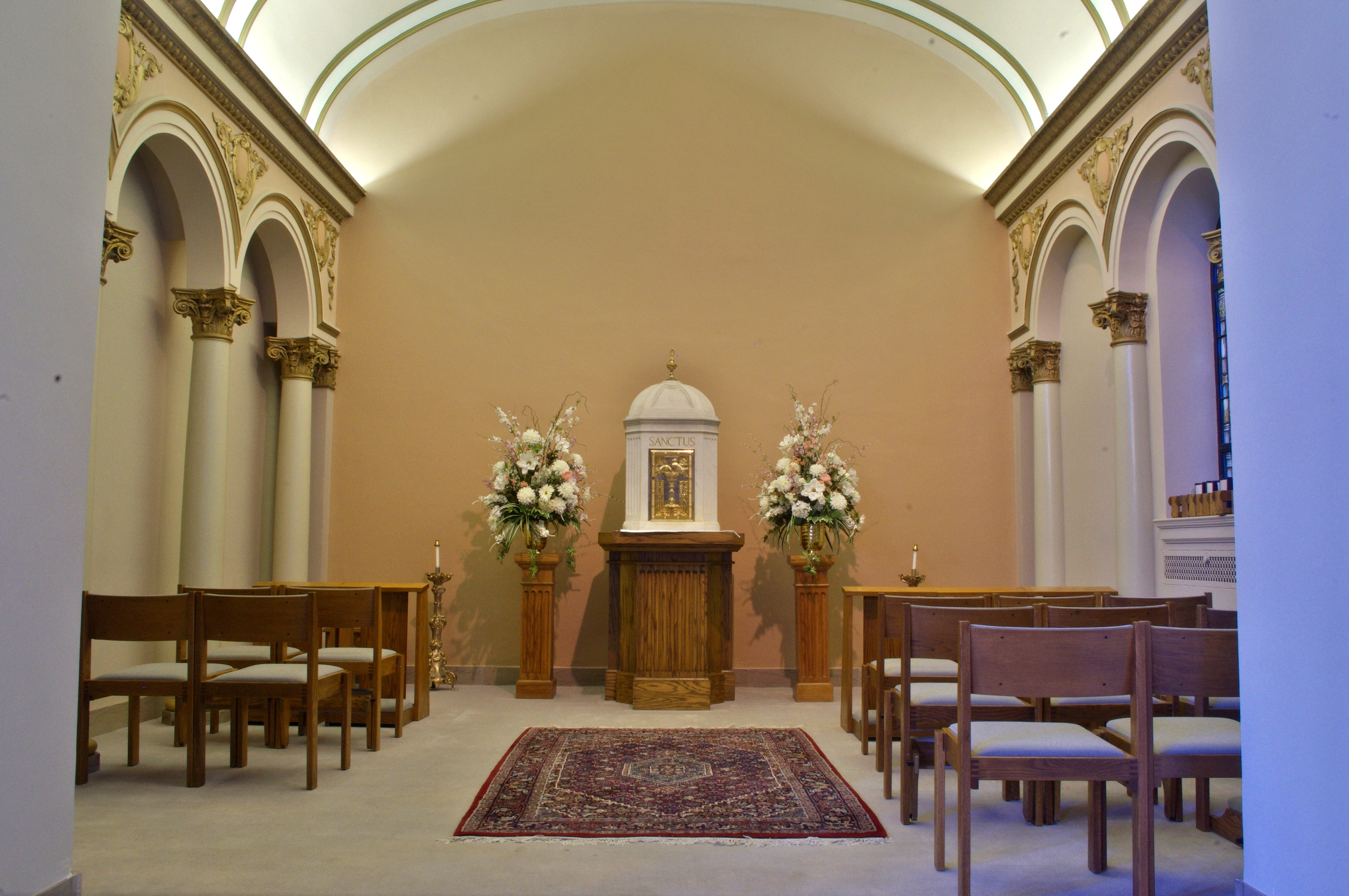
Blessed Sacrament Chapel (2013)

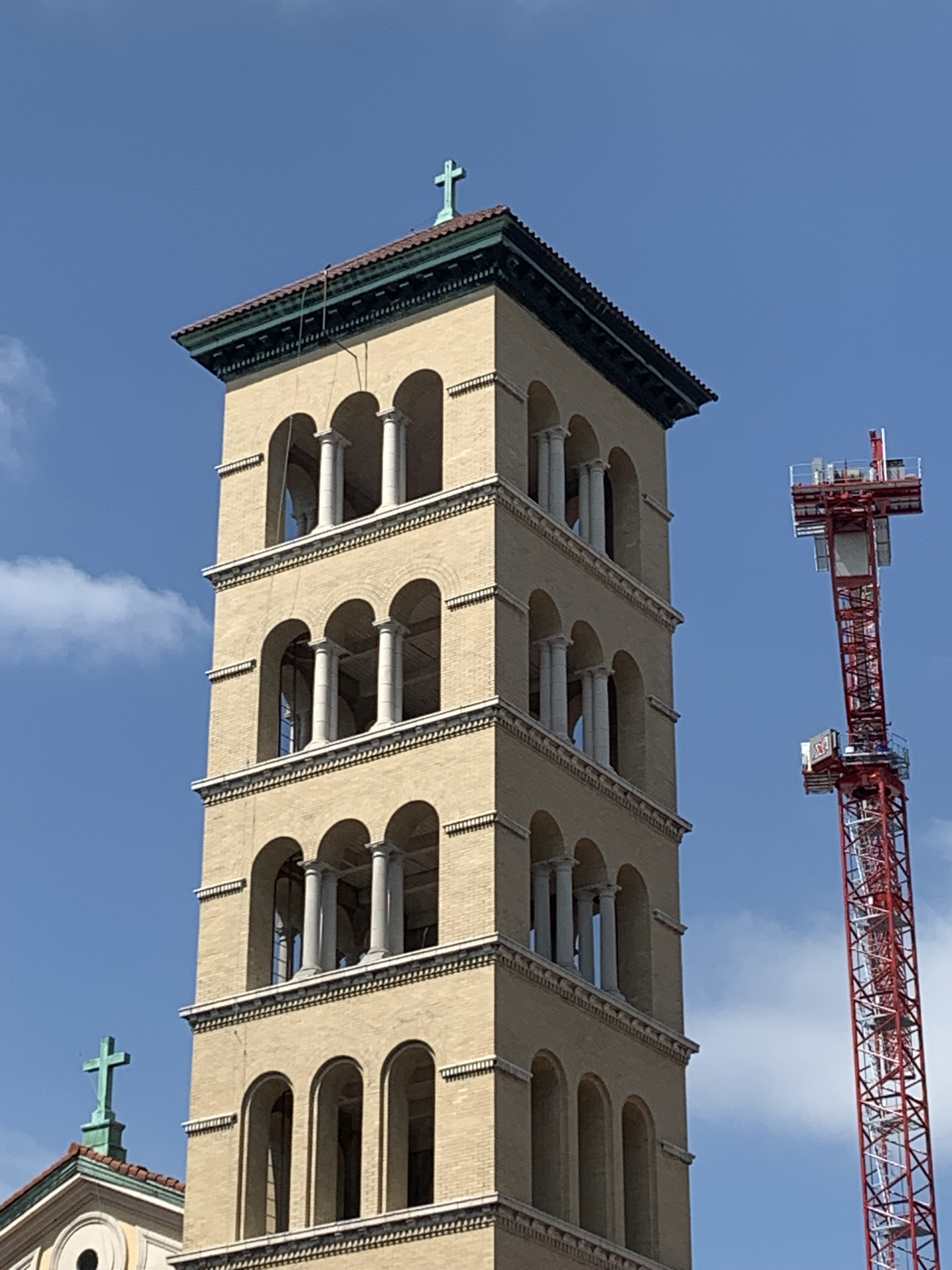
Bell tower (2019)

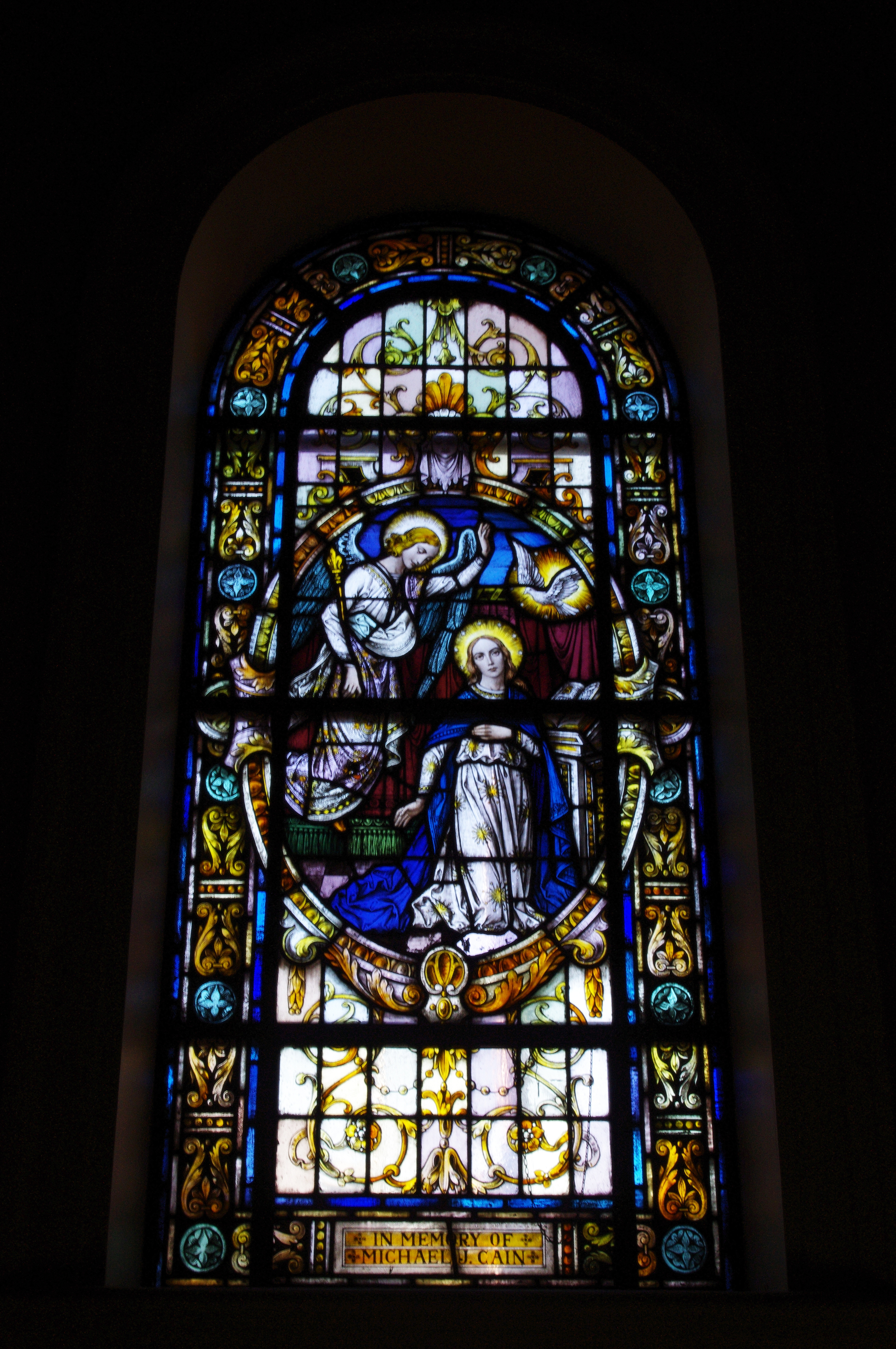
Annunciation stained glass window (2013)

== See also ==
- List of Catholic cathedrals in the United States
- List of cathedrals in the United States
