= Aquinas College (Tennessee) =

Catholic college in Nashville, Tennessee, US

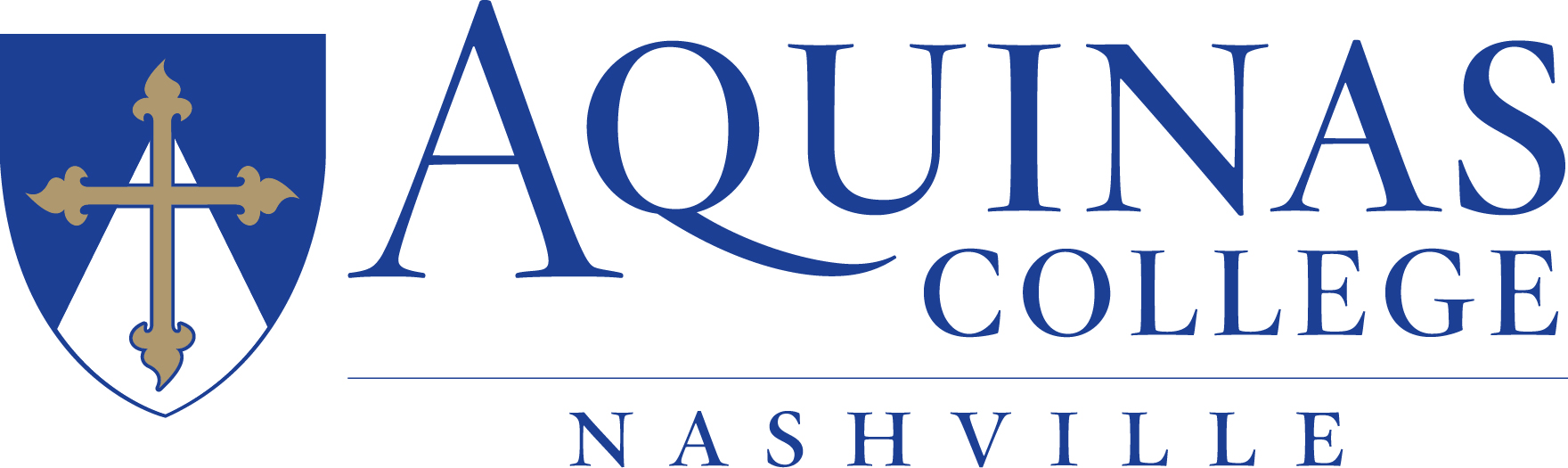
- Former names: St. Cecilia Normal School (1928–1961); Aquinas Junior College (1961–1994)
- Motto: Veritas et Caritas (Latin)
- Motto in English: Truth and Charity
- Type: Private
- Established: 1961
- Founder: Dominican Sisters of Saint Cecilia Congregation
- Religious affiliation: Catholic (Dominican)
- Academic affiliations: SACS
- President: Cecilia Anne Wanner
- Students: 85
- Undergraduates: 40
- Postgraduates: 45
- Location: Nashville, Tennessee, U.S. 36.1320°N 86.8440°W
- Campus: 83 acres (34 ha)
- Patron saint: St. Thomas Aquinas
- Nickname: Cavaliers
- Website: aquinascollege.edu

Aquinas College is a private Catholic college in Nashville, Tennessee, United States. Founded in 1961 and operated by the Dominican Sisters of St. Cecilia, the college serves the educational mission of the Catholic Church through undergraduate and graduate programs, particularly in teacher formation, liberal arts, and catechetical education. The institution is named for St. Thomas Aquinas, the thirteenth-century Dominican theologian and Doctor of the Church. The college's motto, Veritas et Caritas ("Truth and Charity"), reflects its commitment to the integration of faith and reason, intellectual formation, and service to the Church and society.

== History ==
=== Origins and establishment of Aquinas Junior College ===
The roots of Aquinas College date to 1928, when the Dominican Sisters of St. Cecilia established St. Cecilia Normal School to provide professional training for sisters preparing for the teaching apostolate. In 1929, the normal school became affiliated with The Catholic University of America, making it one of the first Catholic teacher-training institutions in the region to establish such a relationship. As the number of sisters engaged in teaching ministries grew throughout the twentieth century, the need for a degree-granting institution dedicated to teacher preparation became increasingly evident.

In 1961, the Dominican Sisters of St. Cecilia founded Aquinas Junior College on the present campus along Harding Pike in Nashville. The college replaced the normal school and expanded its mission by admitting members of the public in addition to religious sisters. The inaugural class included nursing students from St. Thomas School of Nursing, members of the Dominican congregation, and lay students. The institution became coeducational in 1962.

During its early decades, the college developed a variety of academic and professional programs designed to address educational and workforce needs in Middle Tennessee. Programs included liberal arts studies, teacher education, nursing, allied health professions, business, and criminal justice. Aquinas also sponsored lecture series and continuing education opportunities that connected the college with the broader Nashville community.

=== Accreditation and expansion ===
In 1971, Aquinas Junior College received accreditation from the Southern Association of Colleges and Schools (SACS) to award associate degrees. The college continued to expand its academic offerings while strengthening its reputation for teacher preparation and Catholic education.

In 1994, approval was granted to offer bachelor's degrees in education. The institution became a four-year college and adopted the name Aquinas College. During the following years, additional bachelor's degree programs were introduced in areas such as liberal arts, business, and nursing.

Approval to offer master's degrees in education was granted in 2012, further expanding the college's role in preparing teachers, school leaders, and educational professionals. Over time, the college increasingly concentrated its resources on teacher formation and Catholic educational leadership, reflecting the growing needs of Catholic schools throughout the United States.

=== Twenty-first century ===
In the twenty-first century, Aquinas has broadened its service to the Catholic Church through catechist formation programs, a certificate program for first-year seminarians, professional development opportunities for educators, conferences, summer institutes, and outreach initiatives. These programs support religious sisters, seminarians, Catholic school teachers, catechists, and lay leaders from across the country.

== Academics ==
Aquinas College offers undergraduate and graduate degrees grounded in the Catholic intellectual tradition and the Dominican emphasis on the harmony of faith and reason. Academic programs are designed to cultivate intellectual excellence, moral formation, and professional competence. The college is particularly known for its preparation of teachers for Catholic schools.

In addition to degree programs, Aquinas provides continuing education, catechetical formation, literacy initiatives, educational workshops, and summer institutes designed to serve Catholic educators, families, and parish communities.

== Campus ==
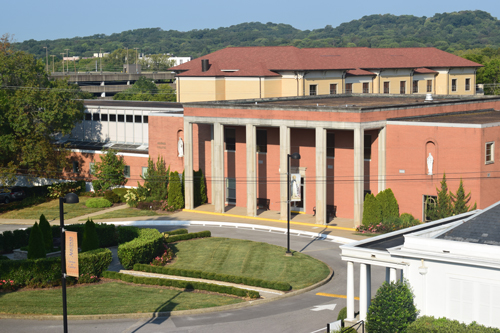
Aquinas College main academic building and traffic circle, with Siena Hall rising in the background and Corpus Christi Adoration Chapel beside the college to the lower right

Aquinas College is situated approximately five miles (8 km) west of downtown Nashville on the Dominican Campus, a wooded campus characterized by historic buildings and educational facilities.

The campus is shared with Saint Cecilia Academy, a Catholic college-preparatory school for young women, and Overbrook Catholic School, a Catholic elementary school. Also on campus is the Corpus Christi Adoration Chapel.

Conference and event facilities on campus include Siena Hall Conference Center and the Aquinas Center, both of which host retreats, educational workshops, conferences, teacher formation programs, and community events throughout the year.
