= St. Cecilia Academy (Nashville, Tennessee) =

Location
- 4210 Harding Pike; Nashville, (Davidson County), Tennessee 37205; United States
- 36°7′56″N 86°50′34″W

Information
- Type: Private, Single-sex, College-preparatory
- Religious affiliation: Roman Catholic
- Patron saint: Saint Cecilia
- Established: 1860
- Sister school: Montgomery Bell Academy
- CEEB code: 431-740
- Principal: Sister Josemaria
- Head of school: Sister Dominic
- Grades: 7–12
- Enrollment: 270 (2024-2025)
- Colors: Red; White
- Mascot: Scarab
- Nickname: SCA
- Team name: Scarabs
- Accreditation: Cognia
- Yearbook: The Cecilian
- Website: www.stcecilia.edu

St. Cecilia Academy is a private, college preparatory, all-female academy for girls grades 7 through 12 in Nashville, Tennessee. Founded in 1860 by the Dominican Sisters of Nashville.

== Athletics ==
St. Cecilia Academy is a member of the Tennessee Secondary School Athletic Association and competes in the Division II-AA classification. Junior high athletes compete in the Harpeth Valley Athletic Conference HVAC.

== Accreditations and affiliations ==
Accredited By: COGNIA, Southern Association of Independent Schools (SAIS), and Southern Association of Colleges and Schools (SACS).

== Notable alumni ==
- Missy Kane, runner, television personality
