= Stanley Joseph Ott =

American prelate

His Excellency, The Most Reverend Stanley Joseph Ott, S.T.D., Ph.D.
- Bishop of Baton Rouge titular bishop of Nicives
- Bishop Ott
- See: Diocese of Baton Rouge
- Installed: January 13, 1983
- Term ended: November 28, 1992
- Predecessor: Joseph Vincent Sullivan
- Successor: Alfred Clifton Hughes
- Previous post: Auxiliary Bishop of New Orleans (1976-1983)

Orders
- Ordination: December 8, 1951 by Martin John O'Connor
- Consecration: June 29, 1976 by Philip Hannan

Personal details
- Born: June 29, 1927 Gretna, Louisiana, US
- Died: November 28, 1992 (aged 65) Baton Rouge, Louisiana, US
- Buried: Saint Joseph Cathedral Cemetery, Baton Rouge
- Denomination: Roman Catholic Church
- Parents: Manuel Peter Оtt & Lucille Berthelot
- Education: St. Joseph Seminary College; Pontifical Gregorian University

Stanley Joseph Ott, S.T.D., (June 29, 1927 – November 28, 1992) was an American prelate of the Roman Catholic Church. He served as bishop of Baton Rouge in Louisiana from 1983 until his death in 1992. He previously served as an auxiliary bishop of the Archdiocese of New Orleans in Louisiana from 1976 to 1983.

== Biography ==
=== Early life and education ===
Stanley Ott was born on June 29, 1927, in Gretna, Louisiana, the youngest of three children of Manuel Peter Оtt and his wife, Lucille Berthelot. He was related to Mel Ott, a famous professional baseball player for the New York Giants.

Stanley Ott received his early education at the parochial school of St. Joseph's Parish in Gretna, where he also served as an altar boy. He then attended St. Aloysius High School in New Orleans, Louisiana. Following his graduation from St. Aloysius in 1944, Ott decided to study for the priesthood instead of entering the military service.

Ott attended St. Joseph Seminary College in Saint Benedict, Louisiana, before entering Notre Dame Seminary in New Orleans. He continued his studies in Rome, residing at the Pontifical North American College while he studied at the Pontifical Gregorian University.

=== Priesthood ===
While in Rome, Ott was ordained a priest for the Archdiocese of New Orleans at the North American College by Archbishop Martin O'Connor on December 8, 1951. He earned a doctorate in theology from the Gregorian in 1954. Following his return to Louisiana, the archdiocese assigned Ott as a curate at St. Frances Xavier Cabrini Parish in New Orleans, where he remained for three years. He served as an assistant chaplain at the Catholic Student Center of Louisiana State University in Baton Rouge, then part of the archdiocese, from 1957 to 1961.

In 1961, Pope John XXIII erected the new Diocese of Baton Rouge out of the Archdiocese of New Orleans. Ott was incardinated, or transferred, into the new diocese. Bishop Robert Emmet Tracy named Ott as judicial vicar and a curate at St. Joseph Cathedral in Baton Rouge. He was named chancellor of the diocese in 1966 and rector of the cathedral in 1968. In addition to these duties, he also served as dean of the Central Deanery and a member of the diocesan college of consultors.

=== Auxiliary Bishop of New Orleans ===
On May 24, 1976, Ott was appointed auxiliary bishop of New Orleans and titular bishop of Nicives by Pope Paul VI. He received his episcopal consecration on June 29, 1976, from Archbishop Philip Hannan serving as consecrator, with Archbishop William Borders and Bishop Joseph Sullivan as co-consecrators. The consecration was held at the Cathedral Basilica of St. Louis, King of France, in New Orleans. Hannan named Ott as his vicar general.

=== Bishop of Baton Rouge ===
Ott was named the third bishop of Baton Rouge by Pope John Paul II on January 13, 1983. During his nine-year tenure, he encouraged the laity to participate more in diocesan affairs, and promoted the ecumenical movement by engaging with leaders of other religions. He also oversaw a major reorganization of the presbyteral council and other diocesan structures.

An outspoken opponent of abortion rights for women, Ott urged Catholics to become involved in the pro-life movement and participated in Operation Rescue protests. In 1984, he received heavy criticism for conducting a mass for Elmo Patrick Sonnier, who was sentenced to death in Louisiana for murdering two teenagers. Ott served as chairman of the Committee on the Laity of the National Conference of Catholic Bishops and was a delegate to the third Synod of Bishops in 1987. He was a member of the Baton Rouge Sierra Club and the Knights of Columbus. He also served as the grand prior of the Southeastern USA Lieutenancy of the Order of the Holy Sepulchre.

=== Death ===
In March 1991, Ott was diagnosed with inoperable liver cancer. It spread to his spine by October of that year. He eventually lost the use of his legs, and underwent radiation treatment. Stanley Ott died in Baton Rouge in September 1992 at age 65.

== Sources ==
- The Bishops of Baton Rouge, diobr.org – Roman Catholic Diocese of Baton Rouge website. Retrieved: 2010-06-03.

Catholic Church titles
Preceded by Joseph Vincent Sullivan	Bishop of Baton Rouge; 1983–1992	Succeeded by Alfred Clifton Hughes
Preceded by –	Auxiliary Bishop of New Orleans; 1976–1983	Succeeded by –
Preceded by --	Grand Prior Southeastern Lieutenancy of the Order of the Holy Sepulchre; 1984–1992	Succeeded by John Cassata
