= Joseph Vincent Sullivan =

American prelate (1919–1982)

His Excellency, The Most Reverend Joseph Vincent Sullivan
- Bishop of Baton Rouge titular bishop of Thagamuta
- See: Diocese of Baton Rouge
- Installed: September 4, 1974
- Term ended: September 4, 1982
- Predecessor: Robert Emmet Tracy
- Successor: Stanley Joseph Ott
- Previous post: Auxiliary Bishop of Kansas City-Saint Joseph (1967 to 1974)

Orders
- Ordination: June 1, 1946 by Edwin Vincent O’Hara
- Consecration: April 3, 1967 by Charles Herman Helmsing

Personal details
- Born: August 15, 1919 Kansas City, Missouri, US
- Died: September 4, 1982 (aged 63) Baton Rouge, Louisiana, US
- Denomination: Roman Catholic Church
- Education: Catholic University of America
- Motto: Serviam (I will serve)

Joseph Vincent Sullivan (August 15, 1919—September 4, 1982) was an American prelate of the Catholic Church. He served as bishop of the Diocese of Baton Rouge in Louisiana from 1974 until his death in 1982. He previously served as an auxiliary bishop of the Diocese of Kansas City-Saint Joseph in Missouri from 1967 to 1974.

Sullivan was credibly accused by several parishioners of sexual abuse, later admitted by the Diocese of Baton Rouge.

== Biography ==
=== Early life ===
Joseph Sullivan was born on August 15, 1919, in Kansas City, Missouri, to John Lawrence and Anastasia Agnes (née Presser) Sullivan. He received his early education at local Catholic schools, and began his seminary formation in Missouri. He then studied at the Sulpician Seminary of the Catholic University of America in Washington, D.C.

=== Priesthood ===
Sullivan was ordained to the priesthood by Bishop Edwin Vincent O’Hara for the Diocese of Kansas City-St. Joseph, on June 1, 1946. He earned a doctorate in theology from the Catholic University in 1949.Sullivan served as assistant superintendent (1948–50) and superintendent (1951–57) of diocesan schools. From 1957 to 1967, Sullivan was chancellor of the diocese.

=== Auxiliary Bishop of Kansas City-St. Joseph ===
On March 4, 1967, Sullivan was appointed auxiliary bishop of Kansas City-St. Joseph and titular bishop of Thagamuta by Pope Paul VI. He received his episcopal consecration in Kansas City, Missouri, on April 3, 1967, from Bishop Charles Herman Helmsing, with Cardinal John Cody and Bishop Joseph M. Marling serving as co-consecrators. As an auxiliary bishop, he also served as vicar general of the diocese.

=== Bishop of Baton Rouge ===
Following the resignation of Bishop Robert Emmet Tracy, Sullivan was named the second bishop of Baton Rouge by Paul VI on August 8, 1974. His installation took place at the Cathedral of St. Joseph in Baton Rouge on September 4, 1974. He was strongly conservative and emphasized fidelity to Catholic doctrine. In February 1979, Sullivan refused to allow theologian Charles Curran, whom he denounced as "heretical" and "not in accord with Catholic teaching", to speak at the Catholic Campus Ministry at Louisiana State University in Baton Rouge. After he removed the Claretian Fathers from the chaplaincy at Louisiana State University in March 1979, 51 priests filed a list of grievances against Sullivan with the Vatican.

In February 1981, Sullivan issued a pastoral letter in which he declared that ministries to divorced and remarried Catholics "may not witness, explicitly or implicitly, that the living Church condones the marital lifestyle of those living in an invalid marriage." An outspoken supporter of the anti-abortion movement, he frequently condemned abortion and euthanasia. In 1981, Sullivan was the only Catholic bishop in the United States to vote against providing the endorsement of the National Conference of Catholic Bishops to the Hatch Amendment being considered by the US Congress. Sullivan remarked, "Plain logic tells us this is a compromise, and I don't think we have to accept a compromise." He also promoted Catholic education, establishing elementary schools and planning for a new high school.

=== Death and legacy ===
Joseph Sullivan died in Baton Rouge on September 4, 1982, at age 63.

In October 2009, the Diocese of Baton Rouge paid $225,000 to settle a lawsuit filed by a man from Houston, Texas. The plaintiff claimed that he was sexually abused by Sullivan as a seminarian between 1978 and 1982. St. Michael the Archangel High School in Baton Rouge, named after Sullivan, changed its name in 2005 following the settlement of a separate lawsuit alleging Sullivan had sexually abused a minor boy.

== Episcopal succession ==
Catholic Church titles
Preceded by Robert Emmet Tracy	Bishop of Baton Rouge; 1974–1982	Succeeded by Stanley Joseph Ott
Preceded by –	Auxiliary Bishop of Kansas City-St. Joseph; 1967–1974	Succeeded by –
