= Francis B. Schulte =

American prelate (1926–2016)

His Excellency, The Most Reverend Francis Bible Schulte O.H.S.
- Archbishop of New Orleans; Titular Bishop of Afufenia
- See: New Orleans
- Appointed: December 6, 1988
- Installed: February 14, 1989
- Term ended: January 3, 2002
- Predecessor: Philip Hannan
- Successor: Alfred Clifton Hughes
- Other posts: Grand Prior, Order of the Holy Sepulchre (1992-2002)
- Previous posts: Bishop of Wheeling-Charleston (1985-1989); Auxiliary Bishop of Philadelphia (1981-1985)

Orders
- Ordination: May 10, 1952 by John Francis O’Hara
- Consecration: August 12, 1981 by John Krol

Personal details
- Born: December 23, 1926 Philadelphia, Pennsylvania, USA
- Died: January 17, 2016 (aged 89) Philadelphia
- Buried: Cathedral Basilica of St. Louis, New Orleans, Louisiana, U.S.
- Denomination: Roman Catholic
- Parents: John Schulte and Katherine Bible Schulte
- Education: St. Charles Borromeo Seminary; University of Pennsylvania; Harvard Graduate School of Education; Oxford University
- Motto: Jesus Christ is lord

Francis Bible Schulte, O.H.S. (December 23, 1926 – January 17, 2016) was an American prelate of the Roman Catholic Church. He served as archbishop of the Archdiocese of New Orleans in Louisiana from 1989 to 2002. He was a member of the Order of the Holy Sepulchre.

Schulte previously served as bishop of the Diocese of Wheeling-Charleston in West Virginia from 1985 to 1989 and as an auxiliary bishop of the Archdiocese of Philadelphia in Pennsylvania from 1981 to 1985.

In the 1990s, Schulte was involved in covering up child sexual abuse in the New Orleans diocese.

== Biography ==
=== Early life ===
Francis Schulte was born on December 23, 1926, in Philadelphia, Pennsylvania, the only child of Francis Xavier Schulte, a pharmacist, and his wife, Katherine (née Bible) Schulte. His parents had him baptized with both their surnames. As a child, his parents enrolled him at Norwood Academy for Boys in Philadelphia. Schulte then studied at St. Joseph's Preparatory School in Philadelphia.

Deciding to become a priest, with his mother's strong support, Schulte enrolled at St. Charles Borromeo Seminary in Philadelphia. He later studied at the University of Pennsylvania in Philadelphia, obtaining a Master of Political Science. Schulte then did more graduate studies at Oxford University in England, and at the Harvard Graduate School of Education in Cambridge, Massachusetts.

=== Priesthood ===
Schulte was ordained to the priesthood at the Cathedral of Saints Peter and Paul in Philadelphia by Cardinal John Francis O’Hara on May 10, 1952, for the Archdiocese of Philadelphia. After his ordination, Schulte was named by Archbishop John F. O'Hara to serve as a faculty member and department head of various Philadelphia-area parochial schools.

Archbishop John Krol appointed Schulte as an assistant superintendent of the archdiocesan schools in 1960. He became superintendent of the schools in 1970. Schulte was raised to the rank of papal chamberlain by Pope Paul VI, and was named pastor of St. Margaret Parish in Narberth, Pennsylvania, in 1980.

=== Auxiliary Bishop of Philadelphia ===
On June 27, 1981, Schulte was appointed an auxiliary bishop of Philadelphia and titular bishop of Afufenia by Pope John Paul II. He was consecrated at the Cathedral of Saints Peter and Paul on August 12, 1981, with Krol as his principal consecrator and Bishops John J. Graham and Martin N. Lohmuller serving as co-consecrators.

=== Bishop of Wheeling-Charleston ===
On June 4, 1985, John Paul II named Schulte as the sixth bishop of Wheeling-Charleston.

=== Archbishop of New Orleans ===
John Paul II appointed Schulte as the twelfth archbishop of New Orleans on December 6, 1988; he was installed on February 14, 1989. Population shifts in the archdiocese forced Schulte to close or merge several parishes. He also restructured the school system of the archdiocese.

Schulte served as the chairman of the United States Conference of Catholic Bishops' Committee on Education, helping to write and research a document on the role local bishops and archbishops should play in Catholic universities within their jurisdictions. In 1992, he created the archdiocese's first formal process for dealing with complaints of sexual abuse by priests or other church employees. In addition to Schulte's duties in the archdiocese, in 1992 he also took on the leadership of the Order of the Holy Sepulchre for the Southeastern United States, being named the grand prior of that region.

=== Retirement ===
On January 3, 2002, John Paul II accepted Schulte's resignation as archbishop of New Orleans. After being diagnosed with prostate cancer in 2005, his doctors suggested he move to Philadelphia for treatment as New Orleans was dealing with the aftermath of Hurricane Katrina.

After spending time in a nursing home in Philadelphia, Francis Schulte died there on January 17, 2016, at age 89. His remains were interred in the crypt of the Cathedral Basilica of St. Louis, King of France in New Orleans.

Catholic Church titles
Preceded by –	Auxiliary Bishop of Philadelphia; 1981–1985	Succeeded by –
Preceded by Joseph Howard Hodges	Bishop of Wheeling-Charleston; 1985–1988	Succeeded by Bernard William Schmitt
Preceded by Philip Matthew Hannan	Archbishop of New Orleans; 1988–2001	Succeeded by Alfred Clifton Hughes
Preceded by Stanley Joseph Ott	Grand Prior Southeastern Lieutenancy of the Order of the Holy Sepulchre; 1992–2002	Succeeded by Alfred Clifton Hughes
