= St. Joseph's Academy (Baton Rouge) =

Location
- 3015 Broussard Street; Baton Rouge, (East Baton Rouge Parish), Louisiana 70808; United States
- 30°26′11″N 91°9′25″W

Information
- Type: Private College Preparatory
- Motto: Sanctity, Joy, and Action
- Religious affiliation: Roman Catholic
- Patron saint: St. Joseph
- Established: 1868
- Founder: Congregation of St. Joseph
- Oversight: Roman Catholic Diocese of Baton Rouge
- President: Jan Rhorer Breen '69
- Principal: Stacia Andricain
- Teaching staff: 85.4 (on an FTE basis)
- Grades: 9–12
- Gender: All-Female
- Enrollment: 1,121 (2021–22)
- Student to teacher ratio: 13.1
- Colors: Red and White
- Athletics: Louisiana High School Athletic Association
- Athletics conference: District 5-5A
- Mascot: Redsticker
- Nickname: SJA
- Team name: Redstickers
- Accreditation: Southern Association of Colleges and Schools
- Newspaper: Student Prints
- Yearbook: Shield
- Tuition: $12, 600
- Website: http://www.sjabr.org

St. Joseph's Academy (SJA) is an all-girls Catholic school established in 1868 by the Sisters of St. Joseph of Medaille in Baton Rouge, Louisiana. It is the sister school of the all-boys Catholic High School. It is located on a live oak-shaded campus in the Mid-City neighborhood, within the Diocese of Baton Rouge.

== History ==
SJA has been recognized five times (in 1991, 1996, 2002, 2016 and 2023) as a Blue Ribbon School by the U.S. Department of Education. In 2002, the Academy was recognized as a school of technology excellence by the U.S. Department of Education, one of only three in the nation.

The Broussard Street campus is the third for the school. The original orphanage and school were located on what is now Seventh Street, and the school moved to its second campus on what is now Fourth and Florida Streets. In 1941, the campus relocated to Broussard Street, its current location.

In 2022, SJA requested approval from the East Baton Rouge Parish Planning and Zoning Commission to convert three residential lots on the south side of Broussard Street, across the street from the main campus, into parking lots. The proposal met with "stiff opposition from neighbors of the school," who cited concerns about traffic, noise, drainage, and the school's stated plans to continue acquiring property in the neighborhood for its use. In 2009, SJA had withdrawn a previous request to convert the residential lots into parking lots in consideration of similar complaints from neighbors. This time, the school received approval and opened the parking lots in 2023, with the result that some neighbors "now live just inches away from the parking lot, only separated by a tan fence," and others "even live right across the street from where cars will exit the parking lot."

== Athletics ==
SJA competes in the highest classification (Class 5A) in the Louisiana High School Athletic Association. The team is known as the Redstickers in a nod to its host city, Baton Rouge. The school's colors are red and white, with navy blue used as an accent color.

SJA competes in Basketball, Bowling, Cross Country, Golf, Gymnastics, Powerlifting, Soccer, Softball, Swimming, Tennis, Track and Field (Indoor and Outdoor), and Volleyball. SJA also has a Competitive Cheerleading team. Though cheerleading is classified as a club at SJA, they are still athletes who compete and bring home titles.

=== State Championships and Runners-Up ===
The Academy has been very successful in many sports with sixty-six state championships, sixty-two state runners-up titles, and three national titles in competitive cheerleading.

Bowling:

Two state runners-up (2007 and 2008).

Cross country:

Fourteen state championships (1983, 1985, 1992, 1993, 2008, 2010, 2014, 2016, 2017, 2018, 2019, 2020, 2021, and 2022, with seven in a row from 2016 to 2022).

Thirteen state runners-up (1980, 1986, 1988, 1989, 1991, 1996, 1997, 1999, 2000, 2001, 2007, 2009, 2015).

Competitive Cheerleading:

Three Super Varsity National Champions titles (2018, 2021, and 2022). Two Large Varsity National Champion Titles (2023 and 2024).

Golf:

Three state championships (2000, 2007, and 2008).

Ten state runners-up (1994, 2003, 2004, 2005, 2006, 2009, 2013, 2014, 2016, 2017).

Gymnastics:

Eight state championships (2006, 2007, 2008, 2009, 2010, 2013, 2019, and 2021, with five in a row from 2006 to 2010).

Five state runners-up (2003, 2004, 2005, 2014, 2015).

Soccer:

A state championship (2023).

A state runners-up (2022).

Swimming:

Seventeen state championships (1994, 1996, 2002, 2003, 2005, 2011, 2012, 2013, 2014, 2015, 2016, 2017, 2018, 2019, 2020, 2021, and 2022, with twelve in a row from 2011 to 2022).

Nine state runners-up (1988, 1990, 1992, 2000, 2001, 2004, 2006, 2008, 2010).

Tennis:

Nine state championships (1984, 1990, 1991, 2006, 2007, 2017, 2018, 2021, and 2022).

Nine state runners-up (1977, 1978, 1979, 1988, 2004, 2008, 2012, 2016, 2019).

Outdoor Track and Field:

Two state championships (2019 and 2021).

Indoor Track and Field:

Two state championships (2020 and 2021).

Three state runners-up (2019, 2022, 2023).

Volleyball:

Ten state championships (1986, 1998, 2001, 2002, 2003, 2004, 2007, 2008, 2009, and 2013, including four in a row from 2001 to 2004).

Ten state runners-up (1963, 1966, 1983, 1987, 1999, 2014, 2016, 2017, 2020, 2021).

== Clubs and Activities ==
SJA has forty+ clubs, including American Sign Language Club, Art Club, Beta Club, CHS Bruinettes, CHS Cheerleaders, CHS Marching Band, Classical Club, Cooking and Crafts Club, Creative Writers Club, Criminal Justice Club, Diversity Club, Drama Club (The Black Box Company), eSports Team, Film Club, French I Club, French II Club, French III/IV Club, Future Business Leaders of America Club, Games Club, Girls Who Code Club, Historical and Geographical Society, Latin Club, Literary Ladies Society, Liturgy Committee, Mu Alpha Theta, National Honor Society, Praise and Worship Band, Red Steppers, Respect Life Club, Robotics Team, Science Club, Self-Defense Club, SJABR TV, Spanish Club, Student Ambassadors, Student Council, Student Ministry, Video Games Club, Yoga Club, and Youth & Government Club.

SJA also has intramural sports including volleyball, ping pong, lacrosse, badminton, archery, dodge ball, pickleball, flag football, rock climbing, Ultimate Frisbee and more.

== Notable alumni ==
- Lindy Boggs, politician
- Sister Helen Prejean, anti-death penalty activist
