= Cathedral of St. John Berchmans (Shreveport, Louisiana) =

Cathedral of Saint John Berchmans
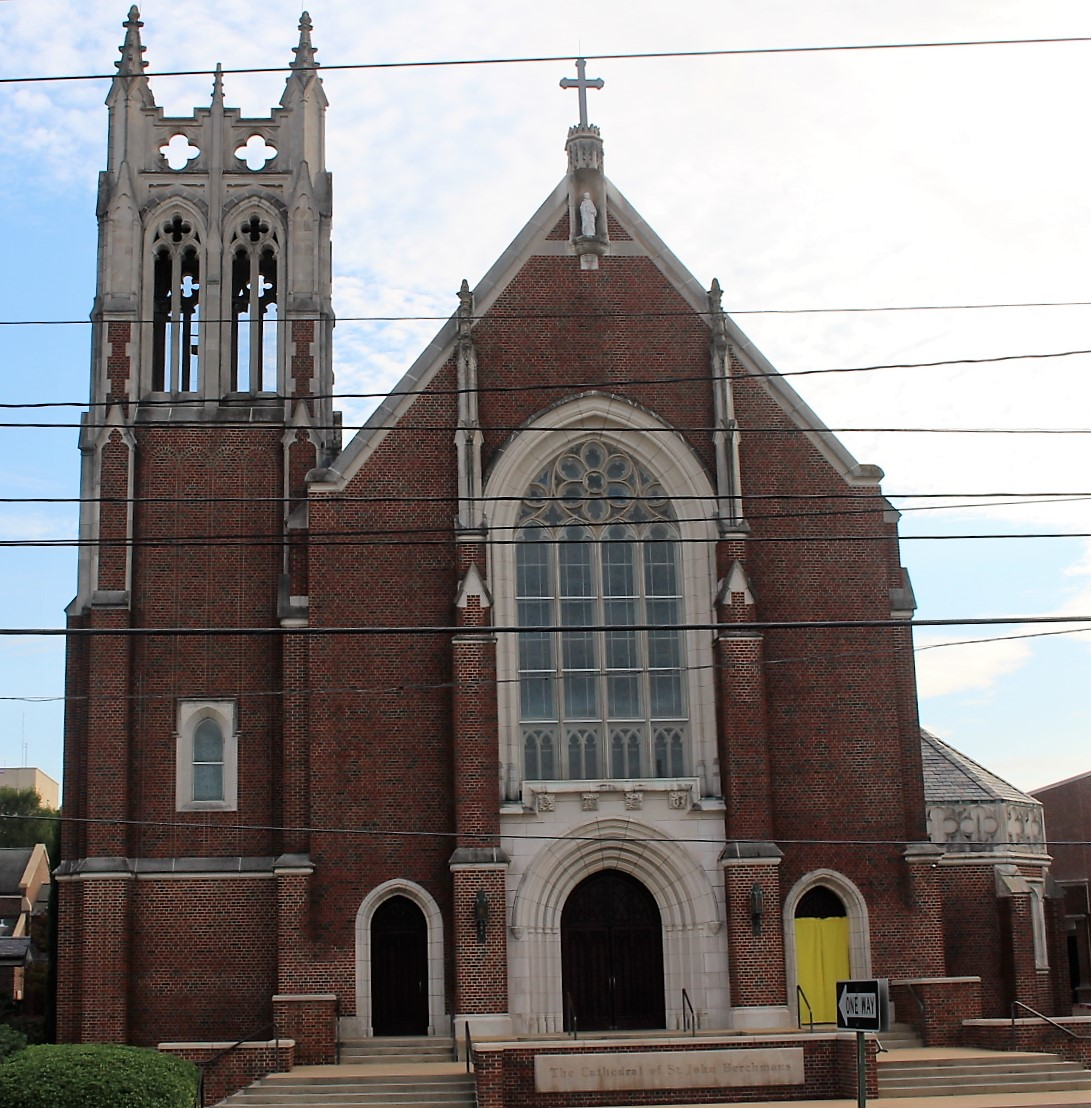

- Location in Louisiana
- 32°29′52″N 93°45′01″W
- Location: 939 Jordan St. Shreveport, Louisiana
- Country: United States
- Denomination: Roman Catholic Church
- Website: www.sjbcathedral.org

History
- Founded: 1902
- Consecrated: January 16, 1929

Architecture
- Style: Tudor Revival, Gothic Revival
- Groundbreaking: July 31, 1927
- Completed: 1928

Specifications
- Materials: Brick

Administration
- Diocese: Diocese of Shreveport

Clergy
- Bishop: Sede Vacante
- Rector: Rev. Raney Johnson
- Vicar: Rev. Monsignor J. Carson Lacaze

The Cathedral of Saint John Berchmans is the cathedral church of the Roman Catholic Diocese of Shreveport, in Shreveport, Louisiana, United States. It is one of only eight parish churches in the world dedicated to the Jesuit Saint John Berchmans. In 2016, the cathedral acquired relics of the heart of St. John Berchmans from the Jesuit order in Belgium, displayed in a reliquary near the main altar.

== History ==
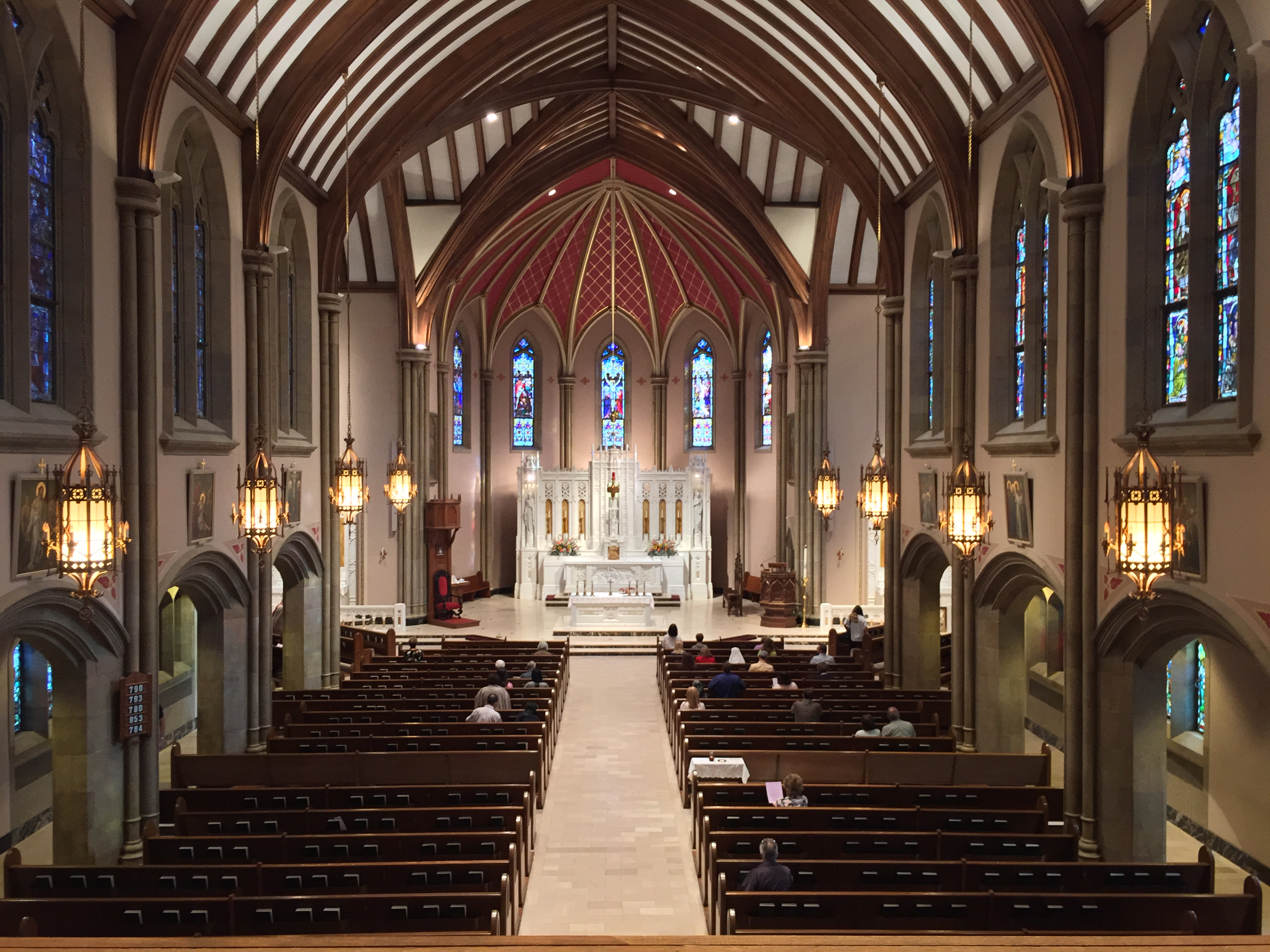
The interior of the cathedral

The old parish church traces its origin to the year 1902, when a group of Jesuit priests arrived in Shreveport to establish and staff a new parish and high school for boys. The parish's first rector was Fr. John F. O'Connor, S.J. By 1924, building a larger church was deemed necessary for the growing congregation. The cornerstone of the structure was laid on 31 July 1927. Construction was finished by June 1928, and the church was consecrated on 16 January 1929. The site of the first church was excavated in 2017 and the state of Louisiana placed a commemorative marker.

The church was designated a co-cathedral for the Diocese of Alexandria–Shreveport in 1977. That diocese was split, however, on 23 June 1986, creating the Diocese of Shreveport. St. John Berchmans became the cathedral church of the new diocese.

The Jesuits relinquished administration of the parish to the diocese in October 1988. Soon after, from 1992 to 1994, a major renovation was completed, which added both a vestibule and free-standing chapel with a seating capacity of 100 persons.

The school is now co-educational for grades Pre-K-8. One of its notable alumni is Don Hathaway, the sheriff of Caddo Parish from 1980 to 2000.

The cathedral was renovated in 2014; the High Altar and Tabernacle were restored and some elements installed in the 1992-1994 renovations were removed.

== Architectural details ==
The cathedral was completed in a mixed Tudor-Gothic style: the exposed wooden beams inside the church are typical of the Tudor style, while the pointed arches of the windows and doorways evince a Gothic influence. Three of the large windows inside the church were executed by the stained-glass artist Emil Frei Jr.

== Gallery ==
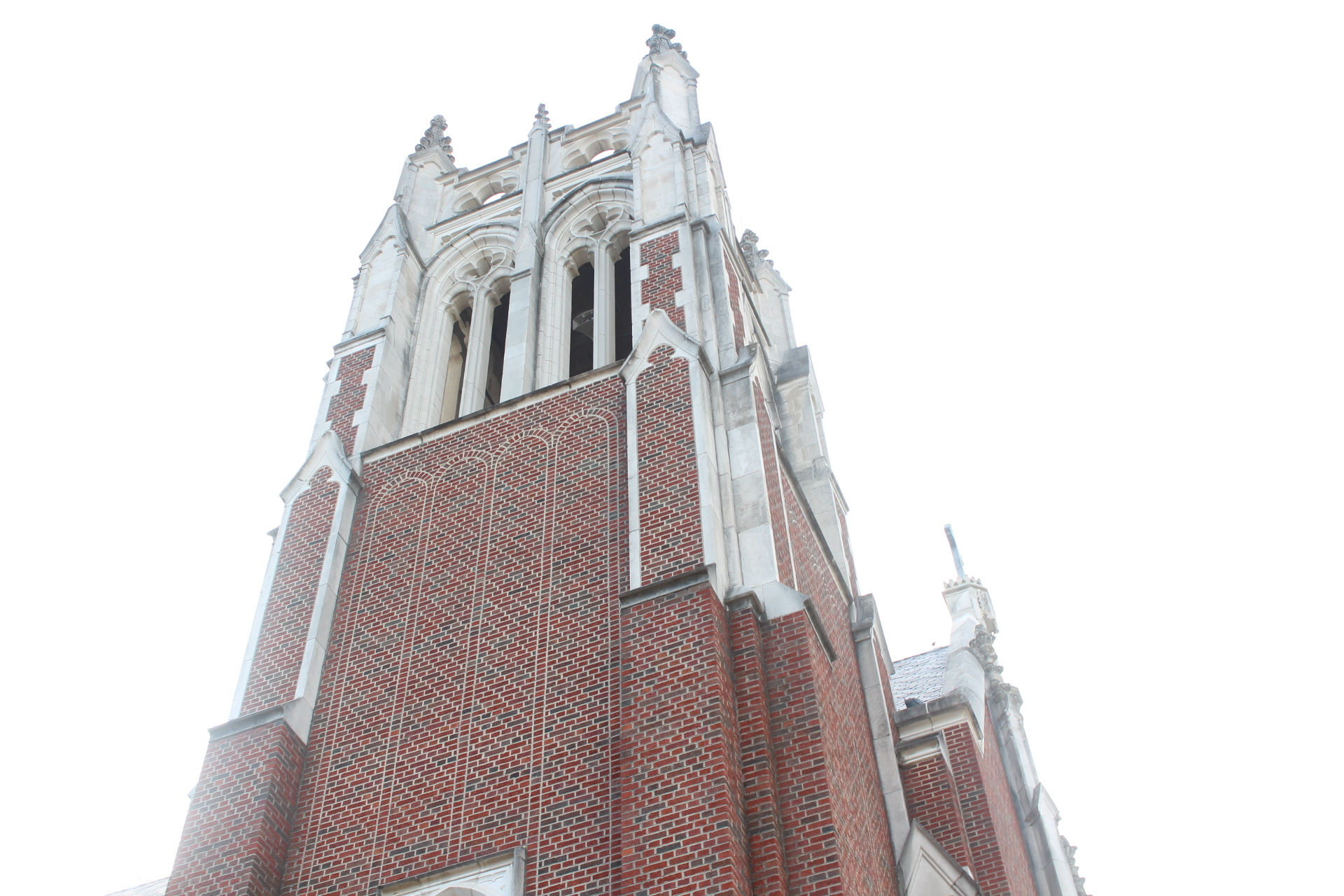

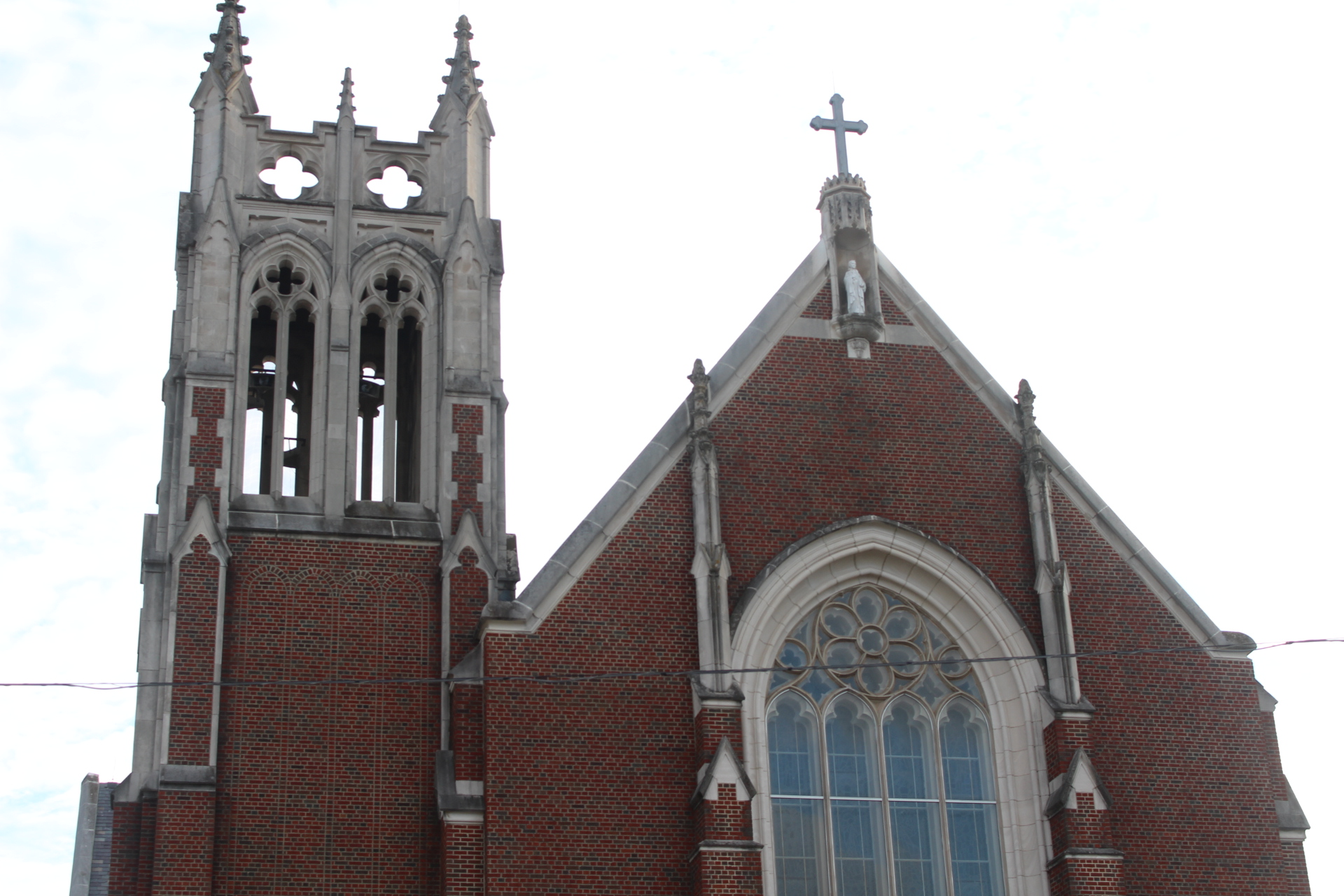

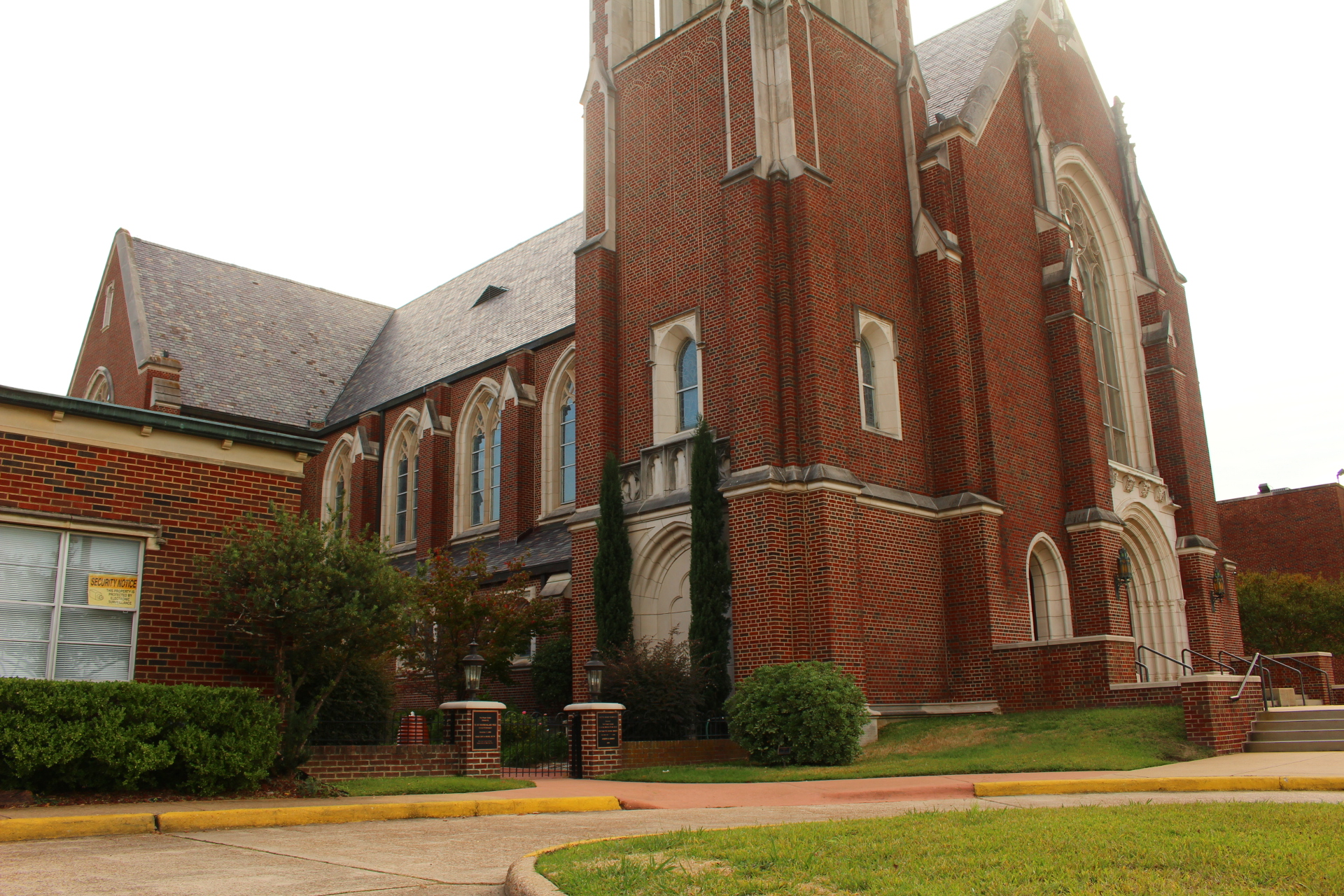

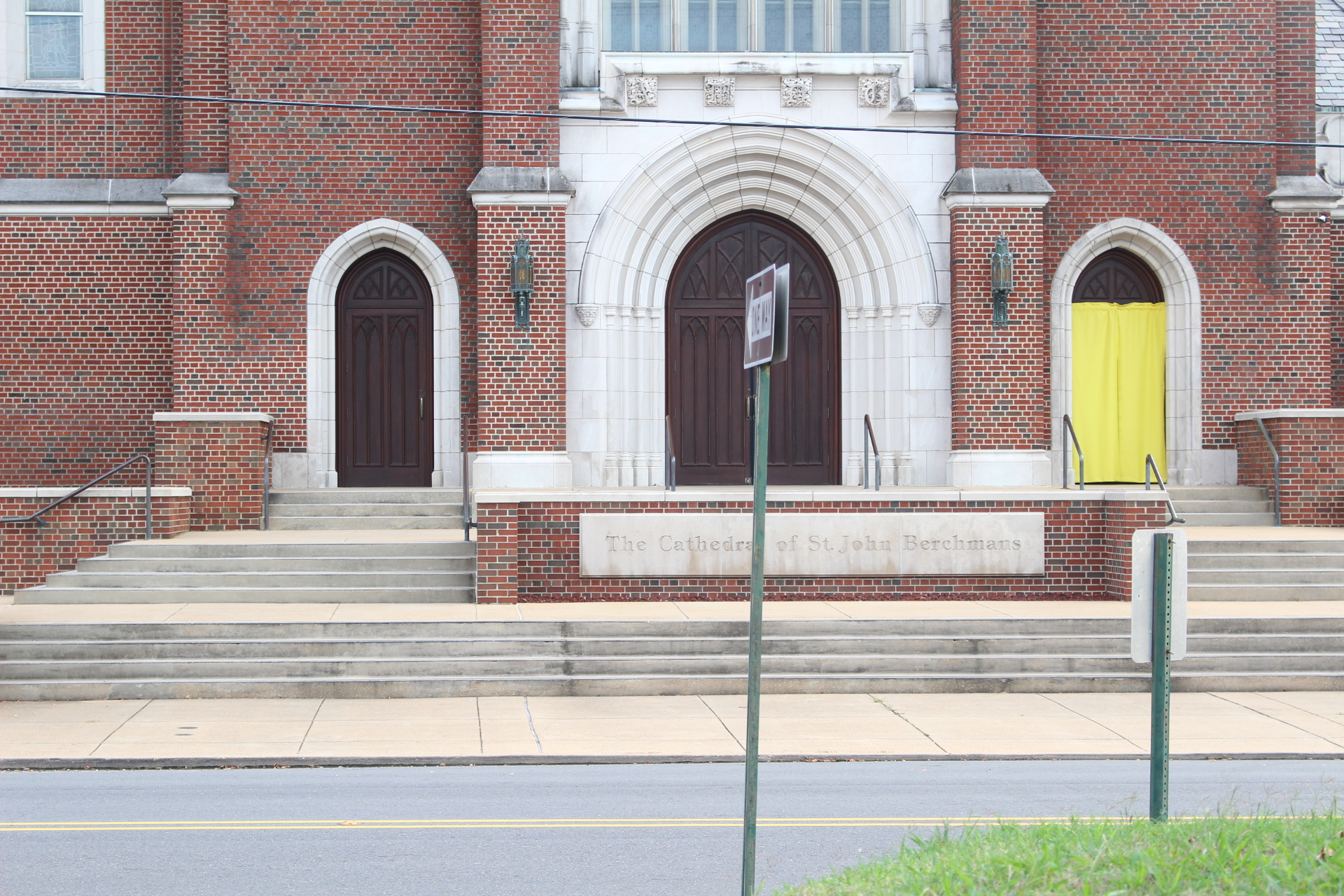

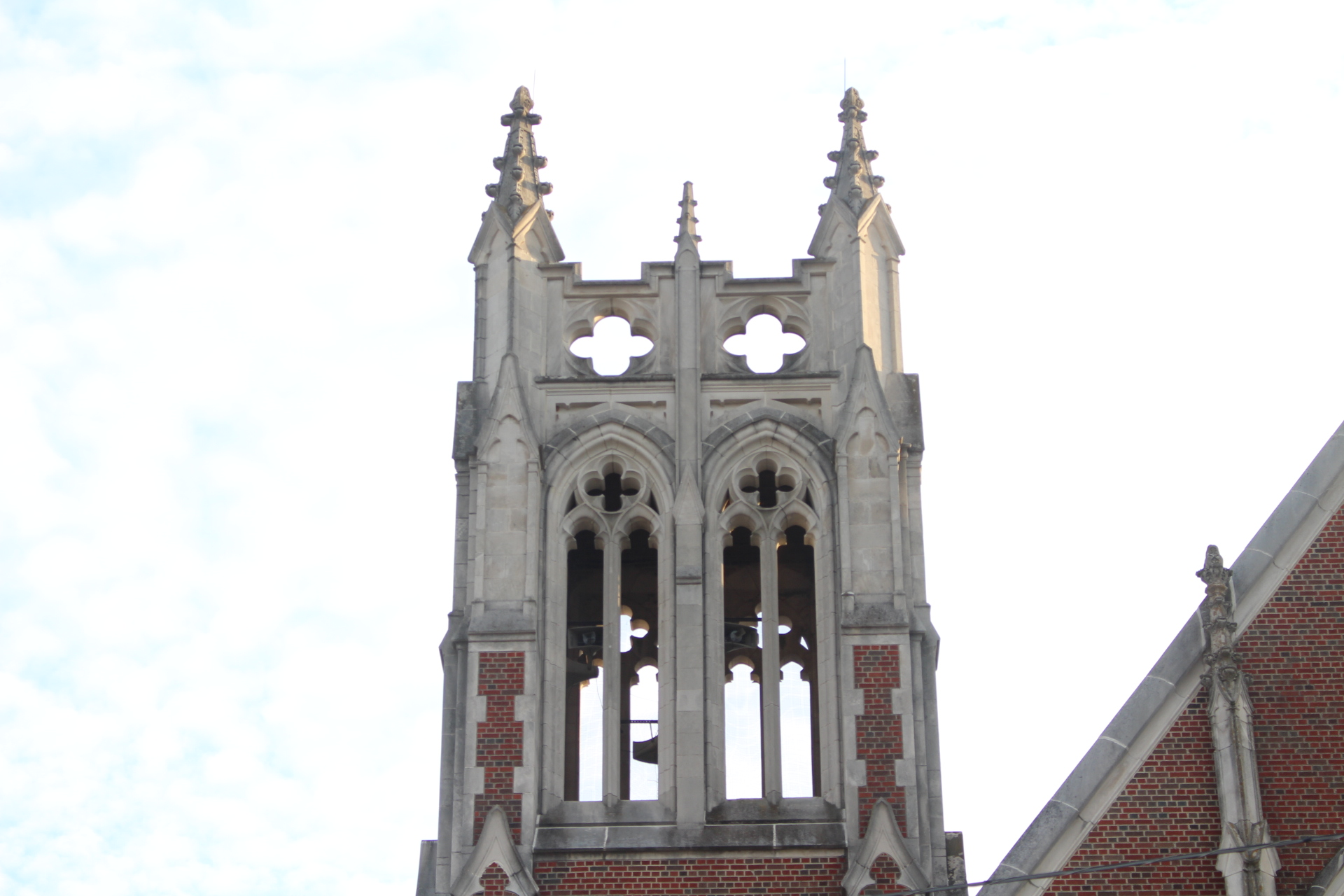

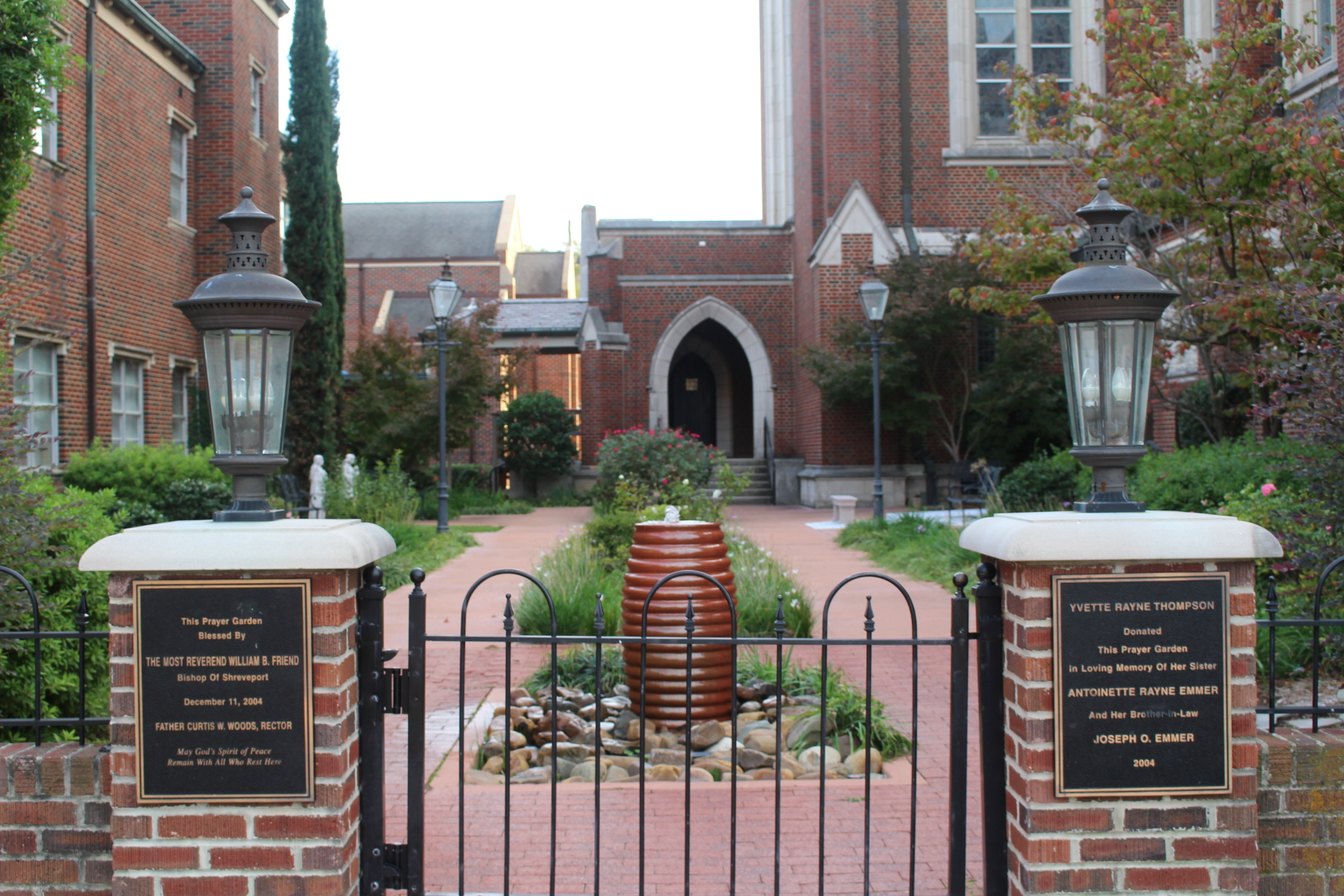

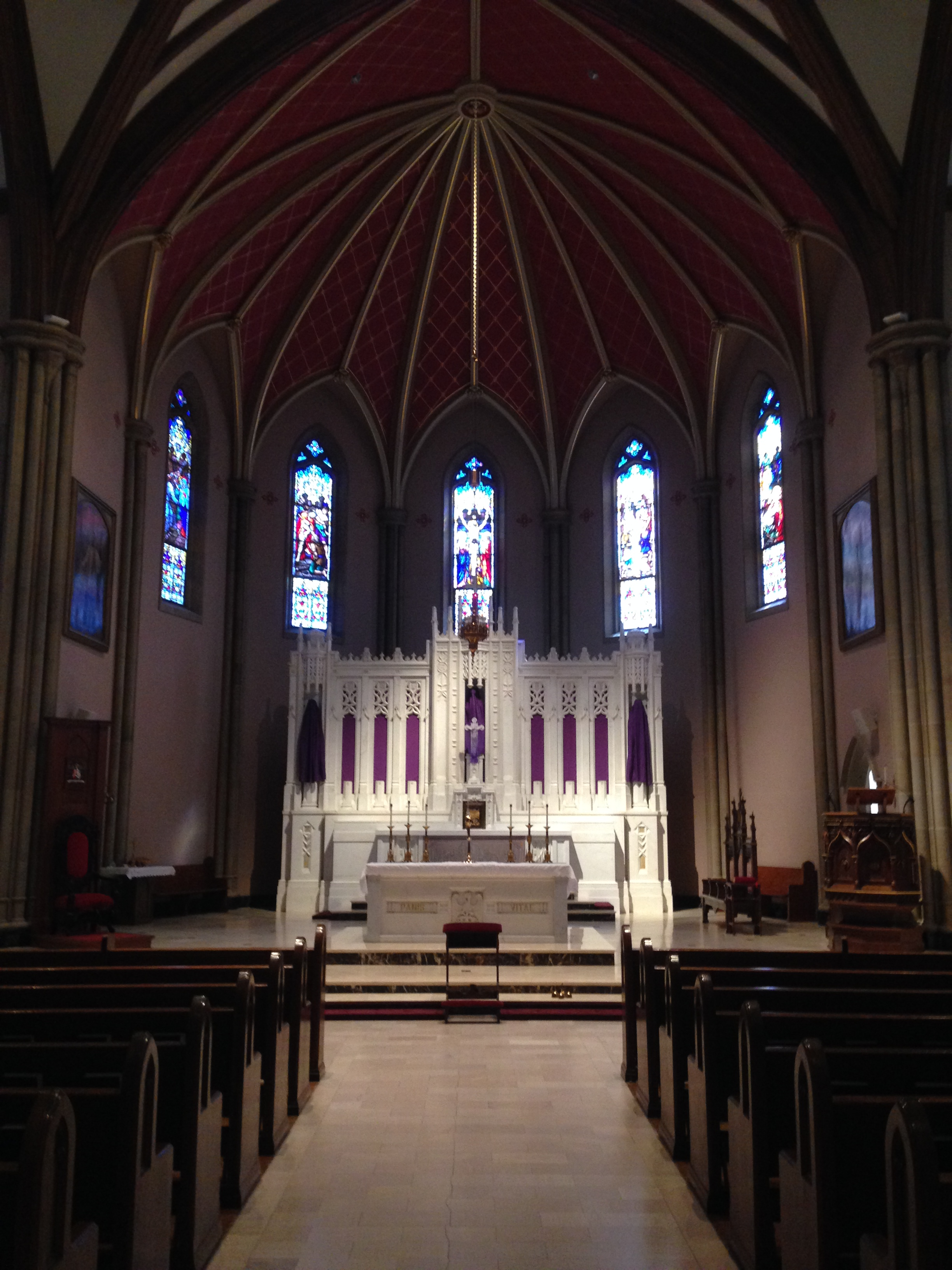

== See also ==
- List of Catholic cathedrals in the United States
- List of cathedrals in the United States
- List of Jesuit sites
