= Alfred Clifton Hughes =

American Catholic prelate (born 1932)

His Excellency, The Most Reverend Alfred Clifton Hughes KCHS
- Archbishop Emeritus of New Orleans
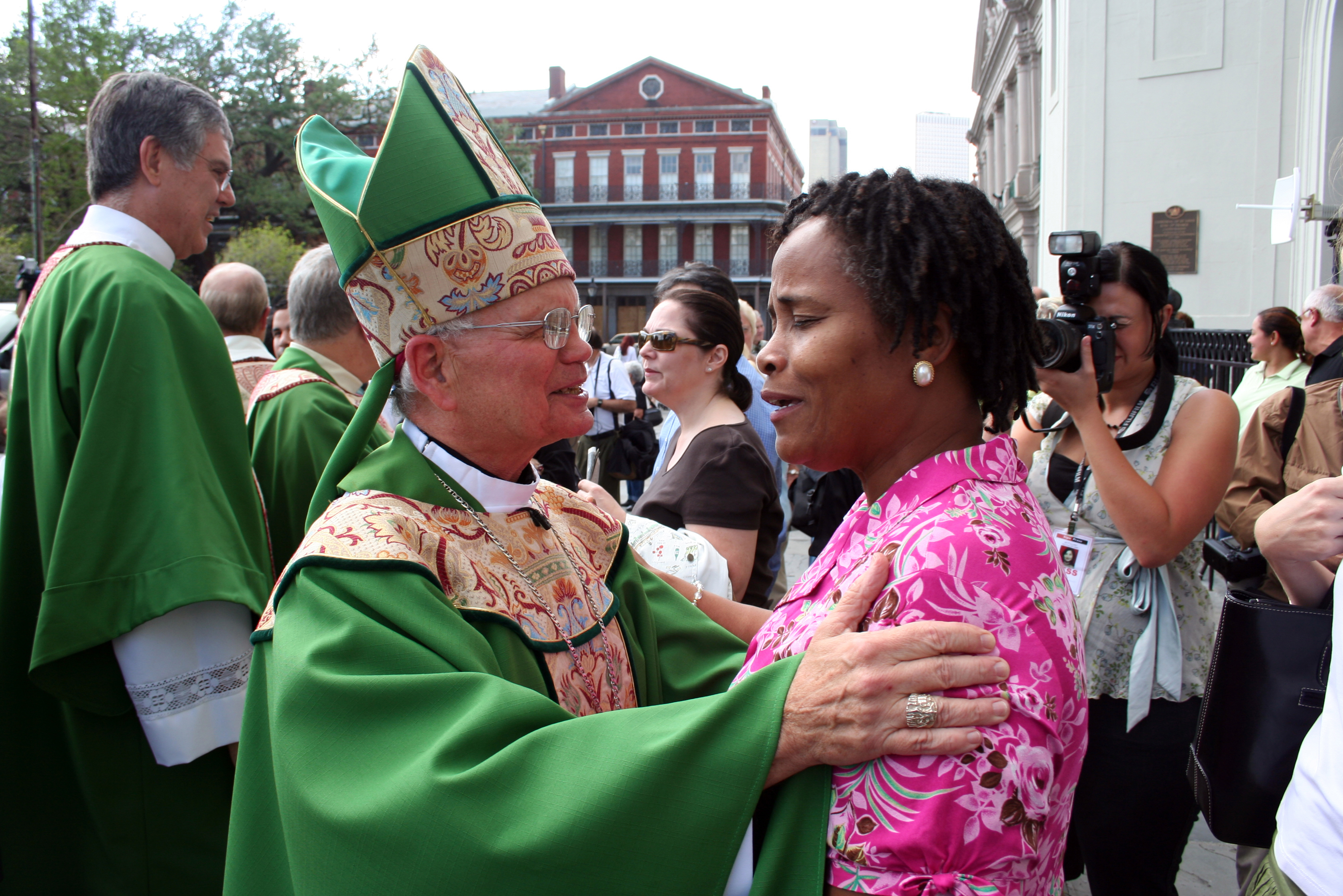
- Archbishop Hughes in 2005, greeting parishioners at St. Louis Cathedral after the first services in New Orleans since Hurricane Katrina.
- Archdiocese: New Orleans
- Appointed: February 16, 2001
- Installed: January 3, 2002
- Retired: June 12, 2009
- Predecessor: Francis Bible Schulte
- Successor: Gregory Michael Aymond
- Previous posts: Bishop of Baton Rouge (1993–2002); Auxiliary Bishop of Boston and Titular Bishop of Maximiana in Byzacena (1981–1993)

Orders
- Ordination: December 15, 1957 by Martin John O’Connor
- Consecration: September 14, 1981 by Humberto Sousa Medeiros, Thomas Vose Daily, and John Michael D'Arcy

Personal details
- Born: December 2, 1932 (age 93) West Roxbury, Massachusetts, US
- Education: St. John's Seminary College; Pontifical Gregorian University
- Motto: For you, God’s own love
- Styles
- Reference style: His Excellency; The Most Reverend
- Spoken style: Your Excellency
- Religious style: Archbishop

Ordination history
History
Episcopal consecration
- Consecrated by: Humberto Sousa Medeiros
- Date: September 4, 1981
Episcopal succession
Bishops consecrated by Alfred Clifton Hughes as principal consecrator
- Roger Morin: February 11, 2003
- Ronald Paul Herzog: November 4, 2004
- Shelton Joseph Fabre: December 13, 2006
- Glen John Provost: April 23, 2007
- Michael Duca: May 19, 2008

Alfred Clifton Hughes (born December 2, 1932) is an American Catholic prelate who served as archbishop of New Orleans in Louisiana from 2002 to 2009.

Hughes previously served as bishop of Baton Rouge in Louisiana from 1993 to 2002 and as an auxiliary bishop of the Archdiocese of Boston in Massachusetts from 1981 to 1993

== Biography ==
=== Early life ===
Hughes was born on December 2, 1932, in West Roxbury, Massachusetts, as the third of the four children of Alfred and Ellen (née Hennessey) Hughes. He had two older sisters, Dorothy Callahan and Marie Morgan, and a younger brother, a Jesuit priest named Kenneth. Deciding to become a priest, Alfred Hughes entered St. John's Seminary College in Boston, where he received a Bachelor of Arts degree in philosophy in 1954. He then furthered his studies in Rome at the Pontifical Gregorian University.

=== Priesthood ===
Hughes was ordained to the priesthood by Archbishop Martin John O'Connor for the Archdiocese of Boston in Rome on December 15, 1957. After his ordination, the archdiocese assigned Hughes to pastoral work in parishes before sending him back to the Gregorian in 1959. He obtained a obtain a doctorate in spiritual theology in 1961. Upon his return to the United States, he became a professor, as well as spiritual director and lecturer, at St. John's Seminary in 1962.

==== Auxiliary Bishop of Boston ====
On July 21, 1981, Hughes was appointed auxiliary bishop of Boston and titular bishop of Maximiana in Byzacena by Pope John Paul II. He received his episcopal consecration on September 14, 1981, from Cardinal Humberto Medeiros, with Bishops Thomas Daily and John D'Arcy serving as co-consecrators.Hughes served as rector of St. John's Seminary from 1981 to 1986. Cardinal Bernard Francis Law named Hughes as his vicar general and vicar of administration in 1990.

=== Bishop of Baton Rouge ===
Hughes was named bishop of Baton Rouge by John Paul II on September 7, 1993; he was installed on November 7, 1993.

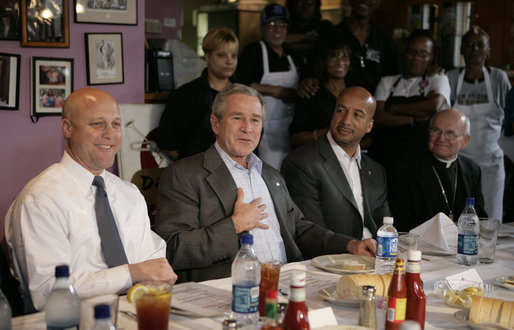
Archbishop Alfred Hughes (far right) with (right to left) New Orleans Mayor Ray Nagin, President George W. Bush, and Louisiana Lt. Gov. Mitch Landrieu (2007)

=== Coadjutor Archbishop and Archbishop of New Orleans ===
On February 16, 2001, Hughes was appointed by Pope John Paul II as coadjutor archbishop of New Orleans, serving under Archbishop Francis Schulte. He visited 90 of the archdiocese’s 142 parishes when he arrived there to become more familiar with the people.

Hughes automatically succeeded Schulte as archbishop of New Orleans upon the latter’s retirement on January 3, 2002. His tenure was marked by Hurricane Katrina in 2005. He implemented a controversial post-Katrina church consolidation program that reduced the number of parishes in the archdiocese from 142 to 108. The hurricane resulted in the departure of a quarter of church membership and left the archdiocese with nearly $300 million in physical damage.

Questions were raised concerning Hughes's handling of child sexual abuse cases by the clergy, in both Boston and New Orleans, and he was widely criticized for attempting to cover up such abuse, including trying to “perpetuate a practice of utmost secrecy and confidentiality with respect to the problem”. For this, he apologized and said, “Our action or inaction failed to protect the innocents among us, the children. I ask for forgiveness."

In April 2009, Hughes was among a group of American bishops who criticized the University of Notre Dame's decision to award US President Barack Obama an honorary doctorate at graduation exercises that Spring. The reasons Include Obama's support for abortion rights for women and other issues viewed as incompatible with Catholic teachings.

That same month, Hughes refused to attend commencement exercises at Xavier University of Louisiana in New Orleans because author Donna Brazile, a supporter of abortion rights, received an honorary degree during the ceremony.

=== Resignation and Legacy ===
On June 12, 2009, Pope Benedict XVI accepted Hughes' resignation as archbishop of New Orleans. He was succeeded by Gregory Aymond. Hughes continued to serve as apostolic administrator until August 20, 2009.

In his retirement, Hughes remained active as a professor and spiritual director at Notre Dame Seminary in New Orleans, and through ministry at Project Lazarus, a ministry to those with AIDS.

Catholic Church titles
Preceded by Francis B. Schulte	Grand Prior Southeastern Lieutenancy of the Order of the Holy Sepulchre; 2002–2009	Succeeded by Gregory Aymond
Preceded by Francis B. Schulte	Archbishop of New Orleans; 2002–2009	Succeeded by Gregory Aymond
Preceded by Stanley Joseph Ott	Bishop of Baton Rouge; 1993–2001	Succeeded by Robert William Muench
Preceded by -	Auxiliary Bishop of Boston; 1981–1993	Succeeded by -
