= Bernard William Schmitt =

American prelate

His Excellency, The Most Reverend Bernard William Schmitt
- Bishop of Wheeling-Charleston; Titular Bishop of Walla Walla
- Archdiocese: Baltimore
- Diocese: Wheeling-Charleston
- Appointed: March 30, 1989
- Term ended: December 9, 2004
- Predecessor: Francis B. Schulte
- Successor: Michael J. Bransfield
- Previous post: Auxiliary Bishop of Wheeling–Charleston (1988–1989)

Orders
- Ordination: May 28, 1955 by Thomas John McDonnell
- Consecration: August 1, 1988 by Francis B. Schulte, William Borders, and Donald Wuerl

Personal details
- Born: August 17, 1928 Wheeling, West Virginia, US
- Died: August 16, 2011 (aged 82) Wheeling
- Motto: Come Holy Spirit

Styles of Bernard W. Schmitt
- Reference style: His Excellency; The Most Reverend
- Spoken style: Your Excellency
- Religious style: Bishop

Bernard William Schmitt (August 17, 1928 – August 16, 2011) was an American prelate of the Roman Catholic Church who served as bishop of the Diocese of Wheeling-Charleston in West Virginia from March 29, 1989, to December 9, 2004.

== Biography ==
=== Early life ===
Bernard Schmitt was born August 17, 1928, in Wheeling, West Virginia, the fourth of seven sons of Lawrence E. Schmitt and Eulalia R. Schiffer Schmitt. He attended Corpus Christi School and Central Catholic High School, both in Wheeling. Schmitt began his studies for the priesthood at St. Charles College in Catonsville, Maryland and continued at St. Mary's Seminary in Baltimore, Maryland.

=== Priesthood ===
Schmitt was ordained to the priesthood for the Diocese of Wheeling-Charleston at the Cathedral of Saint Joseph in Wheeling on May 28, 1955, by Bishop Thomas John McDonnell.

Schmitt's first assignment after his ordination was as associate pastor of the cathedral, while also serving as master of ceremonies to Archbishop John Swint. In 1963, Schmitt was appointed director of vocations, director of the propagation of the faith, and director of the Confraternity of Christian Doctrine for the diocese. In 1966, he was appointed rector of St. Joseph Preparatory Seminary in Parkersburg, West Virginia, where he served until being appointed to his first pastorate at St. Francis of Assisi Parish in St. Albans, West Virginia. There, he was actively involved in the education and the formation of the students and families at the parish school. Schmitt was appointed pastor of St. Michael Parish in Wheeling in 1982.

=== Auxiliary Bishop and Bishop of Wheeling-Charleston ===
On May 31, 1988, Pope John Paul II appointed Schmitt as an auxiliary bishop of Wheeling-Charleston and titular bishop of Walla Walla. He was consecrated at the Cathedral of Saint Joseph on August 1, 1988, by Bishop Francis Schulte. Schmitt remained pastor of St. Michael Parish.

On March 30, 1989, John Paul II named Schmitt to succeed Schulte as bishop of Wheeling-Charleston. On May 17, 1989, Schmitt was installed as bishop.

John Paul II accepted Schmitt's resignation as bishop of Wheeling-Charleston on December 9, 2004.Bernard Schmitt died on August 16, 2011, at Wheeling Hospital in Wheeling. He was one day shy of his 83rd birthday. The chief celebrant and homilist at the funeral was his successor, Bishop Michael Bransfield.

Catholic Church titles
| Preceded by Francis B. Schulte | Bishop of Wheeling-Charleston; 1989–2004 | Succeeded by Michael Joseph Bransfield |
