= Francis Malone =

American Catholic prelate (born 1950)

His Excellency, The Most Reverend Francis Malone
- Bishop Emeritus of Shreveport
- Diocese: Shreveport
- Appointed: November 19, 2019
- Installed: January 28, 2020
- Retired: September 15, 2026
- Predecessor: Michael Duca

Orders
- Ordination: May 21, 1977 by Andrew Joseph McDonald
- Consecration: January 28, 2020 by Gregory Michael Aymond, Anthony Taylor, and Michael Duca

Personal details
- Born: September 1, 1950 (age 76) Philadelphia, Pennsylvania, US
- Education: University of Dallas; Catholic University of America
- Motto: Calicem salutaris accipiam (Latin for 'I will take up the chalice of salvation')
- Styles
- Reference style: His Excellency; The Most Reverend
- Spoken style: Your Excellency
- Religious style: Bishop

Francis Ignatius Malone (born September 1, 1950) is an American Catholic prelate who served as Bishop of Shreveport in Louisiana from 2019 to 2026.

== Biography ==
=== Early life ===
Malone was born on September 1, 1950, in Philadelphia, Pennsylvania. He attended the University of Dallas in Texas, receiving a Bachelor of Arts in history in 1973 and a Master of Divinity and a Master of Education in 1977.

=== Priesthood ===
On May 21, 1977, Malone was ordained to the priesthood at the Church of Nativity of the Blessed Virgin Mary in Philadelphia by Bishop Andrew McDonald for the Diocese of Little Rock. The diocese assigned Malone to the following parishes in Arkansas:

- Associate pastor at St. Michael Parish in West Memphis and Sacred Heart of Jesus in Crawfordville (1977 to 1980)
- Associate pastor of Our Lady of the Holy Souls in Little Rock and pastor of Holy Cross in Sheridan (1980 to 1981). He was also named to the faculty of Mount St. Mary Academy in Little Rock.
- Associate pastor at St. Patrick at North Little Rock (1981 to 1983)
- Associate pastor at St. Vincent de Paul in Rogers and priest in charge at St. John in Huntsville (1983 to 1984). He also served as chaplain at Rogers Memorial Hospital in Rogers.
- Associate pastor at Immaculate Conception in North Little Rock (1984 to 1985)

In 1985, the diocese assigned Malone as pastor of Mary of the Mount Parish in Horseshoe Bend, Arkansas and St. Michael Parish in Cherokee Village, Arkansas. In 1987, Malone entered the Catholic University of America in Washington, D.C., where he received a Licentiate of Canon Law in 1989. After returning to Little Rock, he was named moderator of Cursillo and rector of the Cathedral of St. Andrew in that city.

In 1990, Bishop Andrew McDonald appointed Malone as chancellor and vice officialis. He left the cathedral in 1996 to become pastor of Immaculate Conception and St. Anne Parishes in North Little Rock. After five years at these two parishes, the diocese assigned him as pastor of Christ the King Parish in Little Rock.

=== Bishop of Shreveport ===
Pope Francis appointed Malone to become the third bishop of Shreveport on November 19, 2019. On January 28, 2020, Malone was consecrated as a bishop at the Shreveport Convention Center in Shreveport, Louisiana. Archbishop Gregory M. Aymond served as the principal consecrator. Bishops Anthony B. Taylor and Michael G. Duca served as co-consecrators.

In 2023, Malone gave his support to the canonization cause for the Shreveport Martyrs. They were five French missionary priests who traveled to Shreveport in 1873 to aid the sick during a yellow fever epidemic. All five men died of yellow fever.

On September 15, 2026, Pope Leo XIV accepted Malone's resignation as Bishop of Shreveport, having reached the customary retirement age of 75.

== See also ==
- Catholic Church hierarchy
- Catholic Church in the United States
- Historical list of the Catholic bishops of the United States
- List of Catholic bishops of the United States
- Lists of patriarchs, archbishops, and bishops

Catholic Church titles
Preceded by Michael Duca	Bishop of Shreveport; 2020–2026	Succeeded by Sede Vacante
