= Michael Duca =

American Catholic prelate (born 1952)

His Excellency, The Most Reverend Michael Gerard Duca
- Bishop of Baton Rouge
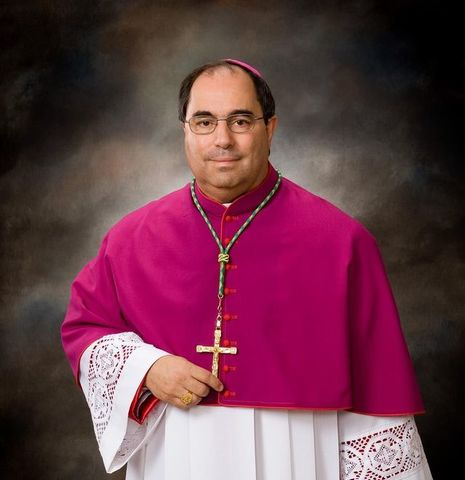
- Church: Catholic
- Diocese: Baton Rouge
- Appointed: June 26, 2018
- Installed: August 24, 2018
- Predecessor: Robert William Muench
- Previous post: Bishop of Shreveport (2008-2018)

Orders
- Ordination: April 29, 1978 by Thomas Ambrose Tschoepe
- Consecration: May 19, 2008 by Alfred Clifton Hughes, Michael Sheehan, and Kevin Farrell

Personal details
- Born: June 5, 1952 (age 74) Dallas, Texas, US
- Education: Holy Trinity Seminary; Southern Methodist University; Pontifical University of St. Thomas Aquinas
- Motto: Spera in Domino (Latin for 'Hope in the Lord')
- Styles
- Reference style: His Excellency; The Most Reverend
- Spoken style: Your Excellency
- Religious style: Bishop

Michael Gerard Duca (born June 5, 1952) is an American Catholic prelate serving as Bishop of Baton Rouge since 2018. He previously served as Bishop of Shreveport from 2008 to 2018.

== Biography ==
=== Early life ===
Duca was born on June 5, 1952, in Dallas, Texas. He attended Saint Thomas Aquinas School in Dallas for primary and secondary education and graduated from Bishop Lynch High School in 1970. Duca attended Holy Trinity Seminary in Irving, Texas, from 1970 to 1978.

=== Priesthood ===
Duca was ordained a priest by Bishop Thomas Ambrose Tschoepe for the Diocese of Dallas at St. Thomas Aquinas Church on April 29, 1978. After his 1978 ordination, the diocese assigned Duca as parochial vicar at the following parishes:

- All Saints in Dallas (1978-1981)
- St. Patrick in Dallas (1981-1984)
- St. Luke in Irving (1984-1985)

In 1985, Duca was appointed as diocesan vocations director and as chaplain at Southern Methodist University. In 1994, Duca traveled to Rome to study at the Pontifical University of St. Thomas Aquinas, receiving a Licentiate in Canon Law in 1996. After returning to Texas in 1996, Duca was named rector of Holy Trinity Seminary, a position he would hold until 2008.

=== Bishop of Shreveport ===
Coat of arms as bishop of Shreveport

Duca was appointed as bishop of Shreveport by Pope Benedict XVI on April 1, 2008. He was consecrated by Archbishop Alfred Hughes on May 19, 2008, at the Shreveport Convention Center, with approximately 3,000 people in attendance. Archbishop Michael Sheehan and Bishop Kevin Farrell were the co-consecrators. Duca was one of the regular panelists on the American Religious Townhall television program.

=== Bishop of Baton Rouge ===
Duca was appointed on June 26, 2018, by Pope Francis as the sixth bishop of Baton Rouge, succeeding Bishop Robert Muench, who retired. Duca was installed on August 24, 2018.

== See also ==
- Catholic Church hierarchy
- Catholic Church in the United States
- Historical list of the Catholic bishops of the United States
- List of Catholic bishops of the United States
- Lists of patriarchs, archbishops, and bishops

== Episcopal succession ==
Catholic Church titles
Preceded by Robert William Muench	Bishop of Baton Rouge; 2018–Present	Succeeded by Incumbent
Preceded by William Benedict Friend	Bishop of Shreveport; 2008–2018	Succeeded by Francis Ignatius Malone
