= Diocese of Shreveport =

Catholic diocese in the United States

Coordinates: 32°28′05″N 93°55′16″W

Diocese of Shreveport Dioecesis Sreveportuensis in Louisiana
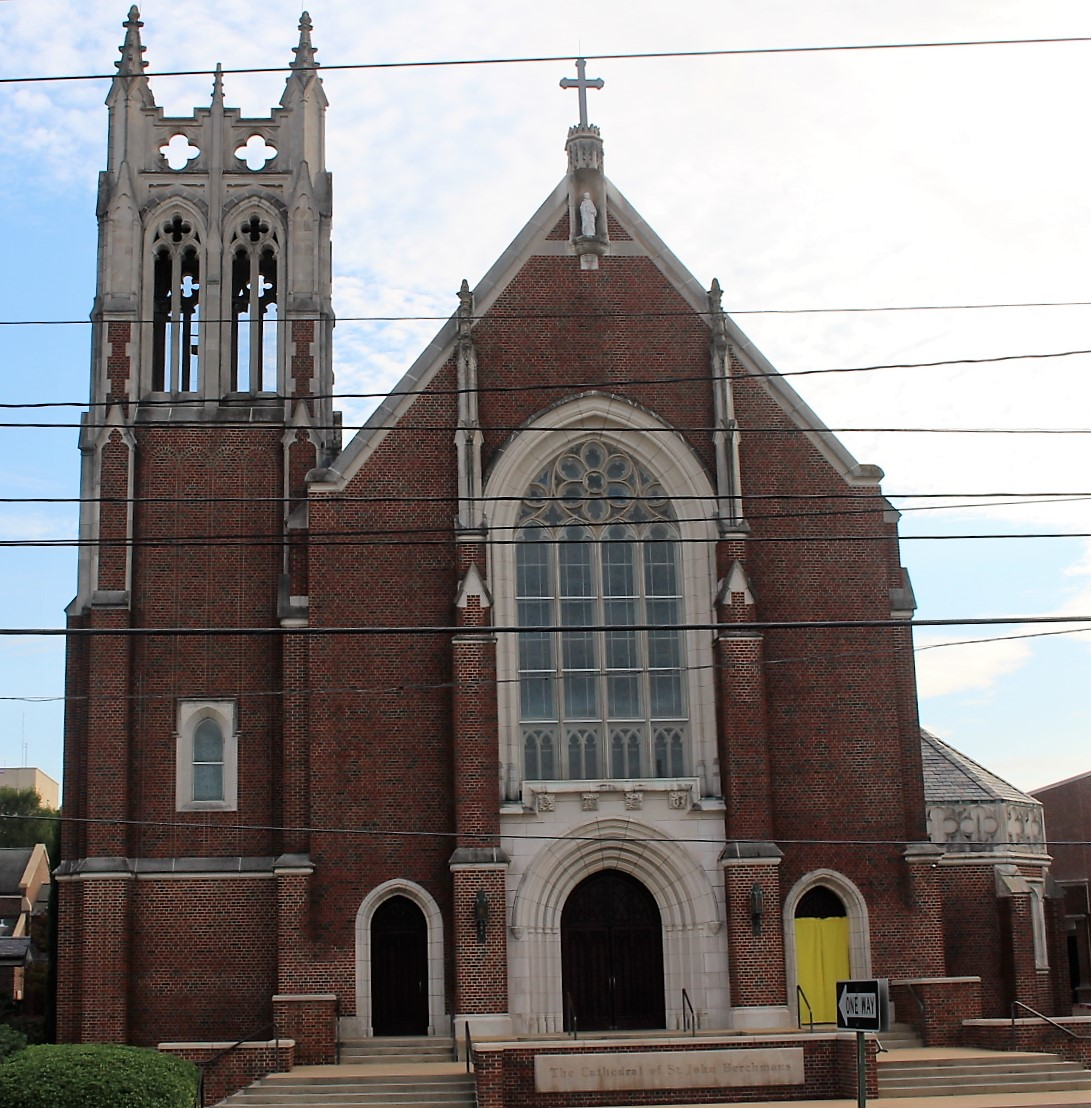
- St. John Berchmans Cathedral

- Coat of arms

Location
- Country: United States
- Territory: 16 parishes of Louisiana
- Metropolitan: Archdiocese of New Orleans
- Headquarters: Shreveport, Louisiana, United States

Statistics
- Area: 28,837 km^{2} (11,134 sq mi)
- Population: Total; Catholics: (as of 2023); 886,376; 42,500 (4.8%)
- Parishes: 25

Information
- Denomination: Catholic Church
- Sui iuris church: Latin Church
- Rite: Roman Rite
- Established: June 16, 1986; 40 years ago
- Cathedral: Cathedral of Saint John Berchmans
- Patron saint: Immaculate Conception
- Secular priests: 42 (28 Diocesan, 14 Religious Orders)

Current leadership
- Pope: Leo XIV
- Bishop: Sede vacante
- Metropolitan Archbishop: James F. Checchio
- Apostolic Administrator: Robert W. Marshall
- Bishops emeritus: Francis Malone

Map
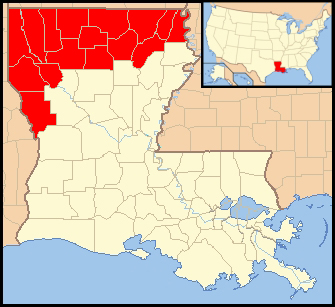

Website
- www.dioshpt.org

The Diocese of Shreveport (Latin: Dioecesis Sreveportuensis in Louisiana) is a diocese of the Catholic Church covering the parishes of northern Louisiana in the United States. It is a suffragan diocese of the Archdiocese of New Orleans. Its mother church is the Cathedral of Saint John Berchmans, in Shreveport.

== Statistics ==
The Diocese of Shreveport covers an area of 28,837 km^{2} (11,134 sq mi). The largest cities in the diocese are Shreveport, Monroe, Bossier City and Ruston.

As of 2023, the Catholic population of the diocese was 42,500. The diocese covered 25 parishes.

== History ==
=== 1717 to 1800 ===
The first Catholic missionary arrived in northwestern Louisiana from East Texas in 1717. The Franciscan priest Antonio Margil encountered Adaes Native Americans near present-day Robeline. At the tribe's request, he constructed the Mission of San Miguel de Linares, the first Catholic church in the region. Margil then journeyed to Natchitoches to minister to the French Catholics population there.

=== 1800 to 1986 ===
After the Louisiana Purchase in 1803, all of present-day Louisiana became part of the United States. At that time, the new State of Louisiana was part of the Diocese of Louisiana and the Two Floridas, with its see city as New Orleans. In 1825, the Vatican renamed this diocese as the Diocese of New Orleans. The town of Shreveport was founded in 1836.

In 1853, Pope Pius IX erected the Diocese of Natchitoches, removing the Shreveport area and most of Louisiana from the Diocese of New Orleans. Jean Pierre, parish priest at Bayou Pierre in Louisiana, started visiting Shreveport in 1856. He later persuaded Natchitoches Bishop Augustus M. Martin to move the Bayou Pierre parish to Shreveport, which happened later in 1856. After working as a tutor to Protestant families for a year, Pierre built a wooden church in Shreveport. He completed a brick church in 1858. By 1869, Pierre estimated that there was a Catholic population of 1,000 in his parish.

On his return to Louisiana from the First Vatican Council in Rome in 1870, Martin stopped in Brittany in France to recruit missionaries. Five of those who responded, along with Jean Pierre, died at Shreveport in the yellow fever epidemic of 1873.

In 1910, Pope Pius X erected the Diocese of Alexandria, which included the Shreveport area. In 1976, Pope Paul VI renamed the Diocese of Alexandria to Diocese of Alexandria-Shreveport. The Church of St. John Berchmans in Shreveport became a co-cathedral in that city.

=== 1986 to present ===
Pope John Paul II erected the Diocese of Shreveport on June 16, 1986, taking its present territory from the Diocese of Alexandria-Shreveport. He appointed Auxiliary Bishop William Friend of Alexandria-Shreveport as the first bishop of Shreveport. Friend designated the Cathedral of St. John Berchmans in Shreveport as the cathedral church of the new diocese. He retired in 2006.

The second bishop of Shreveport was Michael Duca, appointed in 2008. He was made bishop of the Diocese of Baton Rouge in 2018. Peter Mangum served as administrator until the appointment of Francis Malone in 2019.

In 2020, the diocese started a cause for their canonization of Jean Pierre, a pioneer priest from the 19th century. The Vatican has named Pierre and his colleagues as servants of God.

=== Sexual abuse ===
A Tennessee man sued Donald Dickerson and the Jesuit Order in November 2010, claiming that he had been sexually abused by Dickerson. He was also accused of sexually assaulting high school students from the Diocese of Dallas. The Jesuit Order expelled Dickerson in 1986 and he was later defrocked by the Vatican.

== Leadership ==
Bishops of Shreveport (Roman Rite)

- William Benedict Friend (June 16, 1986 – December 20, 2006), retired
- Michael Duca (April 1, 2008 – June 26, 2018), appointed Bishop of Baton Rouge, Louisiana
- Francis Malone (November 19, 2019 – September 15, 2026), retired
  - Apostolic Administrator Robert W. Marshall (September 15, 2026 – Present), Bishop of Alexandria, Louisiana

== Coat of arms ==
Coat of arms of Diocese of Shreveport
Notes The coat of arms was designed and adopted when the diocese was erected Adopted 1986 Escutcheon The coat of arms has a red background with three silver wavy lines. It also displays a gold sunburst with the monogram of the Holy Name (IHS), the symbol of the Society of Jesus. Symbolism The red background represents the Red River. The sunburst with the monogram represents the Jesuit John Berchmans, patron saint of the diocese. The wavy bars represent the Red River, the Mississippi River and the Ouachita River, along with the waters of baptism.

== Education ==
As of 2023, the Diocese of Shreveport had two high schools and four elementary schools.

- Loyola College Prep – Shreveport
- St. Frederick Catholic High School – Monroe

== Media ==
The Diocese of Shreveport publishes a monthly magazine, The Catholic Connection.
