= Robert Emmet Tracy =

American Catholic prelate (1909–1980)

His Excellency, The Most Reverend Robert Emmet Tracy
- Bishop of Baton Rouge; Titular Bishop of Sergentza
- Church: Roman Catholic Church
- See: Diocese of Baton Rouge
- In office: 1961 to 1974
- Successor: Joseph Vincent Sullivan
- Other post: Titular Bishop of Sergentza
- Previous post: Auxiliary Bishop of Lafayette (1959 to 1961)

Orders
- Ordination: June 12, 1932 by John Shaw
- Consecration: May 19, 1959 by Egidio Vagnozzi

Personal details
- Born: September 14, 1909 New Orleans, Louisiana, US
- Died: April 4, 1980 (aged 70) New Orleans
- Education: Saint Joseph Seminary College; Notre Dame Seminary
- Motto: Dominus illuminatio mea (The Lord is my light)

Styles of Robert Tracy
- Reference style: The Most Reverend
- Spoken style: Your Excellency
- Religious style: Monsignor
- Posthumous style: none

Robert Emmet Tracy (September 14, 1909 – April 4, 1980) was an American prelate of the Roman Catholic Church who served as bishop of the Diocese of Baton Rouge in Louisiana from 1961 to 1974. He previously served as an auxiliary bishop of the Diocese of Lafayette in Louisiana from 1959 to 1961.

== Biography ==
=== Early life ===
Robert Tracy was born on September 14, 1909, in New Orleans, Louisiana, to Robert Emmet and Margaret Agnes (née Cahill) Tracy. He studied at Saint Joseph Seminary College in Saint Benedict, Louisiana and Notre Dame Seminary in New Orleans.

=== Priesthood ===
Tracy was ordained to the priesthood in New Orleans for the Archdiocese of New Orleans on June 12, 1932, by Archbishop John William Shaw. After his ordination, the archdiocese assigned Tracy as a curate at St. Leo Parish in New Orleans (1932–1946) and archdiocesan director of the Confraternity of Christian Doctrine (1937–1946). He served as chaplain of the Newman Centers at Tulane University in New Orleans (1941–1946) and at Louisiana State University in Baton Rouge, Louisiana (1946–1959). The Vatican elevated Tracy to the rank of papal chamberlain in 1947 and a domestic prelate in 1949. From 1954 to 1955, he was national chaplain of the Newman Club Federation.

=== Auxiliary Bishop of Lafayette in Louisiana ===
On March 13, 1959, Tracy was appointed auxiliary bishop of the Diocese of Lafayette in Louisiana and titular bishop of Sergentza by Pope John XXIII. Tracy received his episcopal consecration at the Cathedral of Saint Louis in New Orleans on May 19, 1959, from Archbishop Egidio Vagnozzi, with Bishops Maurice Schexnayder and Louis Caillouet serving as co-consecrators.

=== Bishop of Baton Rouge ===
Tracy was named the first bishop of the new Diocese of Baton Rouge on August 10, 1961 by John XXIII. Tracy was installed on November 8, 1961.

From 1962 to 1965, Tracy attended the Second Vatican Council in Rome; on October 24, 1963, he addressed the Council in the name of his fellow American bishops on the subject of racial equality. In 1966, he published his memoir of the Council, entitled American Bishop at the Vatican Council. He established a consultative process as an integral part of the diocesan administration, and encouraged the greater participation of the laity in governing the Church. Tracy also oversaw the construction of the Catholic Life Center and the renovation of St. Joseph Cathedral in Baton Rouge.

In 1967, Tracy became the first American bishop to publish a financial statement for his diocese. In 1972, he established a committee for the regulation of allowing remarried Catholics to receive the sacraments, saying, "The Church has a pastoral responsibility of healing and forgiveness".

=== Retirement and legacy ===
Pope Paul VI accepted Tracy's resignation as bishop of Baton Rouge on March 21, 1974, after twelve years of service. Robert Tracy died in New Orleans on April 4, 1980, at age 70.

== Episcopal succession ==
Catholic Church titles
Preceded by none	Bishop of Baton Rouge; 1961–1974	Succeeded by Joseph Vincent Sullivan
