= William Benedict Friend =

American prelate

His Excellency, The Most Reverend William Benedict Friend
- Bishop of Shreveport titular bishop of Pomaria
- Church: Roman Catholic
- Diocese: Diocese of Shreveport
- In office: 1982–2006
- Predecessor: None
- Successor: Michael Duca
- Previous posts: Bishop of Alexandria-Shreveport (1979 to 1982); Auxiliary Bishop of Alexandria-Shreveport (1982 to 1986)

Orders
- Ordination: May 7, 1959 by James Gibbons
- Consecration: October 30, 1979 by Thomas Joseph Toolen

Personal details
- Born: October 22, 1931 Miami, Florida, U.S.
- Died: April 2, 2015 (aged 83) Coral Springs, Florida
- Motto: Live in the spirit

Styles of William Benedict Friend
- Reference style: His Excellency
- Spoken style: Your Excellency
- Religious style: Monsignor

William Benedict Friend (October 22, 1931 – April 2, 2015) was an American prelate of the Roman Catholic Church. He served as the first bishop of the new Diocese of Shreveport in Louisiana from 1986 to 2006. He previously served as auxiliary bishop and then bishop of the Diocese of Alexandria-Shreveport from 1979 to 1986.

== Biography ==
=== Early life ===
William Friend was born on October 22, 1931, in Miami, Florida. He was ordained to the priesthood at the Cathedral of the immaculate Conception in Mobile, Alabama, by Cardinal James Gibbons on May 7, 1959, for the Diocese of Mobile-Birmingham, Alabama.

=== Auxiliary Bishop and Bishop of Alexandria-Shreveport ===
On August 31, 1979, Pope John Paul II appointed Friend as an auxiliary bishop of Alexandria-Shreveport and titular bishop of Pomaria. He was consecrated by Archbishop Thomas Joseph Toolen on October 30, 1979 at the Cathedral of the Immaculate Conception.

On November 17, 1982, John Paul II appointed him as bishop of the same diocese.

=== Bishop of Shreveport ===
John Paul II erected the Diocese of Shreveport on June 16, 1986, and appointed Friend as its first bishop. He was installed as bishop on July 30, 1986.

=== Retirement and legacy ===
On October 22, 2006, Friend sent the mandatory letter to Pope Benedict XVI resigning the diocese as he had reached the age of 75. His resignation was accepted on December 20, 2006. Friend ran the diocese as apostolic administrator until the pope named a new bishop.

On April 1, 2008, Benedict XVI named Reverend Michael Duca as the new bishop of the diocese, ending Friend's duties as apostolic administrator. On April 2, 2015, William Friend died at his home in Coral Springs, Florida.

== Episcopal succession ==
Catholic Church titles
Preceded by First Bishop	Bishop of Shreveport; 1986–2006	Succeeded by Michael Duca
Preceded by Lawrence Preston Joseph Graves	Bishop of Alexandria-Shreveport; 1982–1986	Succeeded by John Clement Favalora
