= Diocese of Baton Rouge =

Latin Catholic jurisdiction in the US

Coordinates: 30°27′29″N 91°08′25″W

Diocese of Baton Rouge Dioecesis Rubribaculensis
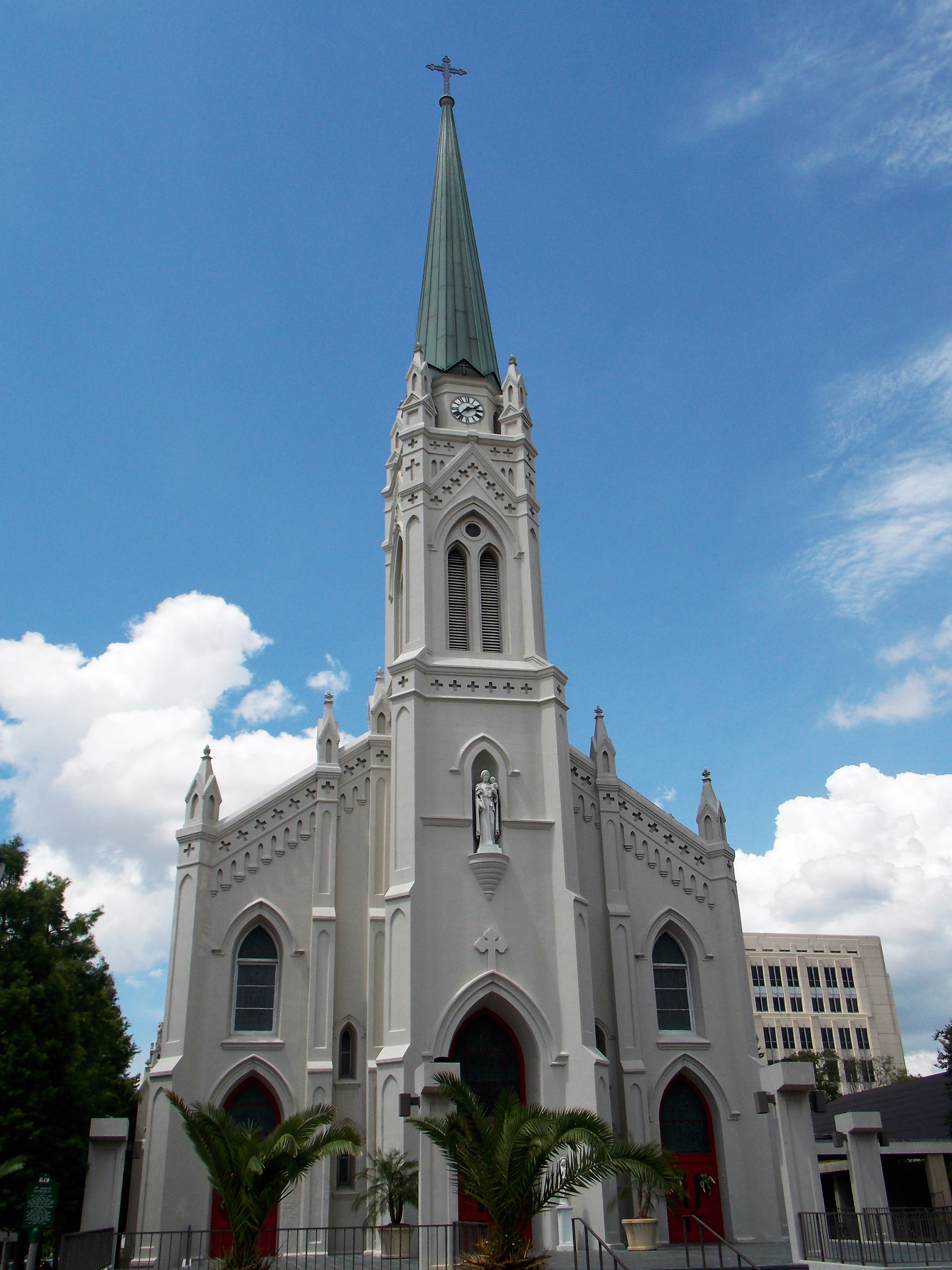
- St. Joseph Cathedral

- Coat of arms

Location
- Country: United States
- Territory: Parishes of Ascension, Assumption, East Baton Rouge, East Feliciana, Iberville, Livingston, Pointe Coupee, Tangipahoa, St. Helena, St. James, West Baton Rouge and West Feliciana
- Ecclesiastical province: Archdiocese of New Orleans

Statistics
- Area: 5,513 sq mi (14,280 km^{2})
- Population: Total; Catholics: (as of 2012); 950,000; 235,000 (24.7%)
- Parishes: 64

Information
- Denomination: Catholic Church
- Sui iuris church: Latin Church
- Rite: Roman Rite
- Established: July 20, 1961
- Cathedral: St. Joseph Cathedral
- Patron saint: Saint Joseph

Current leadership
- Pope: Leo XIV
- Bishop: Michael Gerard Duca
- Metropolitan Archbishop: James F. Checchio
- Vicar General: Thomas Ranzino
- Bishops emeritus: Robert William Muench

Map
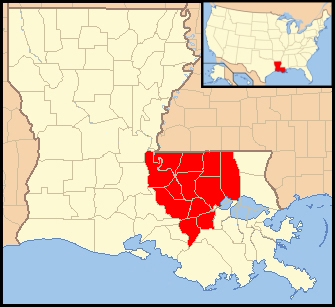

Website
- diobr.org

The Diocese of Baton Rouge (Latin Dioecesis Rubribaculensis; French Diocèse de Bâton-Rouge; Spanish: Diócesis de Baton Rouge), is a Roman Catholic diocese in the Florida Parishes region of the U.S. state of Louisiana. It is a suffragan in the ecclesiastical province of the Archdiocese of New Orleans. The current bishop is Michael Duca.

== History ==
=== 1700 to 1800 ===
The Diocese of Baton Rouge began with the work of French missionaries among the Native American peoples of the area. During the first part of the 18th century, the area was called Lower Louisiana, a French colony. The Jesuit priest Pierre Charlevoix celebrated the first mass in the Baton Rouge area in 1722. The first Catholic church in the colony was St. Francis Chapel, constructed by French Capuchin missionaries at the Fort Pointe Coupee near present-day Pointe Coupée in 1738 Another Capuchin missionary established St. James Church in 1767 in St. James

With the end of the Seven Years War in 1763, France was forced to surrender its colonies in North America. At this point, Spain took control of Lower Louisiana along with other vast areas of the American continent. Spanish missionaries constructed the next group of churches in the Baton Rouge area:

- St. Gabriel the Archangel Church, constructed for Acadian exiles in St. Gabriel in 1769. It is the oldest church in the diocese that still stands in its original form.
- Ascension of Our Lord Church, constructed in 1772 in present-day Donaldsonville
- Our Lady of Sorrows Church, constructed in Baton Rouge in 1792. It was a predecessor of St. Joseph Cathedral.
- Assumption of the Blessed Virgin Mary Church in present-day Plattenville, constructed in 1793

In 1793, Pope Pius VI erected the Diocese of Louisiana and the Two Floridas, with New Orleans as the see city.

=== 1800 to 1961 ===
With the Treaty of San Ildefonso in 1800, France regained the colonies in North America that it had surrendered to Spain in 1763. However, three years later, French Emperor Napoleon Bonaparte sold the colonies to the United States under the Louisiana Purchase. The Baton Rouge area was now part of the United States.

The Vatican in 1826 renamed the Diocese of Louisiana and the Two Floridas as the Diocese of New Orleans. It was elevated to a metropolitan archdiocese in 1850. The Baton Rouge area would remain part of the archdiocese for the next 110 years. The first Catholic church in Plaquemine, St. John the Evangelist, was dedicated in 1850. The oldest church in Tangipahoa Parish is St. Dominic in Husser, erected as a mission church in 1855.

In 1923, the Franciscan Missionaries of Our Lady opened the Our Lady of the Lake Sanitarium in Baton Rouge. It is today FMOL Health | Our Lady of the Lake. At the same time, the Franciscans opened a school of nursing at the hospital. It is today the Franciscan Missionaries of Our Lady University.

=== 1961 to 1974 ===
On July 22, 1961, Pope John XXIII erected the Diocese of Baton Rouge, taking its territory from the Roman Catholic Archdiocese of New Orleans. He named Auxiliary Bishop Robert E. Tracy of the Diocese of Lafayette in Louisiana as the first bishop of Baton Rouge. Tracy designated St. Joseph Church as the cathedral church of the new diocese. When he took office, the new diocese had a Roman Catholic population 164,476 out of a total population of 464,904, as reported in the 1960 U.S. census.

Tracy established a consultative process as an integral part of the diocesan administration, and encouraged greater participation by the laity in governing the diocese. He also oversaw the construction of the Catholic Life Center in Baton Rouge and the renovation of St. Joseph Cathedral. In 1967, Tracy became the first American bishop to publish a financial statement for his diocese. In 1972, he established a committee to regulation the provision of sacraments to remarried Catholics.

=== 1974 to 1983 ===
After Tracy retired in 1974, Pope Paul VI named Joseph V. Sullivan of the Roman Catholic Diocese of Kansas City-Saint Joseph as the second bishop of Baton Rouge. In February 1979, he refused to allow the theologian Charles Curran, whom Sullivan called "heretical" and "not in accord with Catholic teaching", to speak at the Catholic Campus Ministry at Louisiana State University (LSU) in Baton Rouge. After Sullivan removed the Claretian Fathers from the chaplaincy at LSU in March 1979, 51 priests filed a list of grievances with the Holy See.

In February 1981, Sullivan issued a pastoral letter in which he declared that ministries to divorced and remarried Catholics "may not witness, explicitly or implicitly, that the living Church condones the marital lifestyle of those living in an invalid marriage." Sullivan died in 1982.

=== 1983 to 2018 ===
In 1983, Pope John Paul II named Auxiliary Bishop Stanley Joseph Ott of New Orleans as the third bishop of Baton Rouge. After Ott died in 1992, John Paul II named Auxiliary Bishop Alfred C. Hughes of the Archdiocese of Boston in 1993 as the next bishop of Baton Rouge.

Our Lady of the Lake Regional Medical Center in 2000 purchased Riverview Medical Center in Gonzales. It is today Our Lady of the Lake St. Elizabeth. The pope in 2001 appointed Hughes as coadjutor archbishop of New Orleans and named Auxiliary Bishop Robert Muench of New Orleans as Hughes' successor in Baton Rouge. Muench retired as bishop of Baton Rouge in 2018.

The current bishop of Baton Rouge is Michael Duca, formerly bishop of the Diocese of Shreveport. He was named bishop by Pope Francis in 2018.

=== Sex abuse controversies ===
The diocese was sued in January 2003 by Patrick Myers, who claimed that he was sexually abused by Christopher Springer. a diocesan priest, from 1978 to 1982 when Myers was an altar server. The diocese removed Springer from ministry in 1985 and the Vatican laicized him in 1990. By July 2004, five more male former altar servers had sued the diocese regarding abuse by Springer, claiming that diocese attempted to hide Springer's alleged crimes. The diocese settled the lawsuits with the plaintiffs in December 2005.

In November 2004, the diocese settled a sexual abuse lawsuit brought by a Baton Rouge man. The plaintiff claimed that Bishop Sullivan had abused him when he was 17-years-old in 1975. Bishop Muench authorized a settlement with the plaintiff, calling the accusations credible. He renamed the Bishop Sullivan High School in Baton Rouge. In October 2009, the diocese paid $225,000 to settle a lawsuit in which a Houston, Texas, man claimed he was sexually abused by Sullivan as a seminarian between 1978 and 1982.

In 2009, Rebecca Mayeux and her parents sued the diocese and one of its priests, Jeff Bayhi. In 2008, the 14-year-old Mayeux had gone to confession with Bayhi and told him that she has been sexually abused by George Charlet Jr., a parish member. In the court filing, Mayeux's lawyers said that Bayhi had failed his legal responsibility to report the abuse to law enforcement. The diocese said that it was legally protected from revealing the contents of a confession in court. The Louisiana Supreme Court had previously ruled that the Catholic Seal of Confession was legally protected In 2016, a judge ruled that Bayli was not legally obligated to report anything said during confession.

In January 2019, the diocese released the names of 37 former clergy who had been accused of committing acts of sexual abuse while serving the diocese. The diocese added four more names to the list in February 2019, two more names in July 2019, two more names in January 2020, and another name in July 2020, bringing the current total to 46.

== Statistics ==
The Roman Catholic Diocese of Baton Rouge includes the civil parishes of Ascension, Assumption, East Baton Rouge, East Feliciana, Iberville, Livingston, Pointe Coupee, Tangipahoa, St. Helena, St. James, West Baton Rouge and West Feliciana. It has a total area of about 5,405 square miles (14,000 km^{2}).

The diocese as of 2014 consisted of 64 diocesan parishes, two ethnic apostolates, and two university chaplaincies served by a total of 106 priests (50 active and 21 retired diocesan priests, 24 active and six retired religious priests, and five priests of other jurisdictions), 70 permanent deacons, three transitional deacons, 16 lay male religious (brothers), 90 female religious (nuns and sisters), and 17 seminarians.

== Bishops of Baton Rouge ==
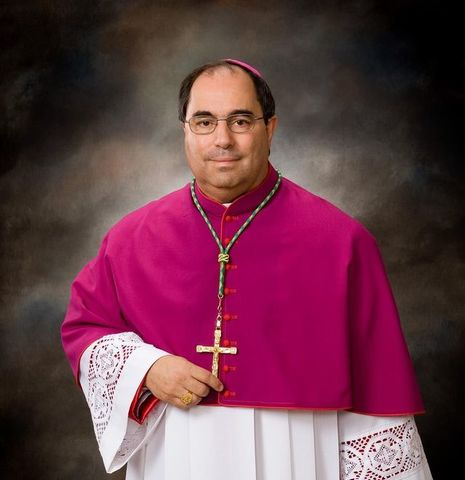
Bishop Duca (2022)

=== Diocesan bishops ===
1. Robert Emmet Tracy (1961-1974)
2. Joseph Vincent Sullivan (1974-1982)
3. Stanley Joseph Ott (1983-1992)
4. Alfred Clifton Hughes (1993-2001), appointed Archbishop of New Orleans
5. Robert William Muench (2002-2018)
6. Michael Gerard Duca (2018–present)

=== Other diocesan priests who became bishops ===
- William Donald Borders, appointed Bishop of Orlando in 1968 and later Archbishop of Baltimore
- Shelton Fabre, appointed Auxiliary Bishop of New Orleans in 2006 and later Bishop of Houma-Thibodaux. He has been the Archbishop of Louisville since 2022.

== Schools ==
=== High schools ===
- Ascension Catholic Diocesan Regional School – Donaldsonville
- Catholic High School – Baton Rouge
- Catholic of Pointe Coupee – New Roads
- Saint Thomas Aquinas Diocesan Regional High School – Tangipahoa Parish
- St. John School – Plaquemine
- St. Joseph's Academy – Baton Rouge
- St. Michael the Archangel High School – Shenandoah, East Baton Rouge Parish
