= Philip Hannan =

American Catholic prelate (1913–2011)

His Excellency, The Most Reverend Philip Matthew Hannan
- Archbishop of New Orleans
- See: Archdiocese of New Orleans; Titular Bishop of Hieropolis
- Installed: October 13, 1965
- Retired: December 6, 1988
- Term ended: December 6, 1988
- Predecessor: John Patrick Cardinal Cody
- Successor: Francis Bible Schulte
- Other posts: Auxiliary Bishop of Washington; 1956–1965; Titular Bishop of Hieropolis

Orders
- Ordination: December 8, 1939 by Ralph Hayes
- Consecration: August 28, 1956 by Amleto Giovanni Cicognani

Personal details
- Born: May 20, 1913 Washington, District of Columbia, US
- Died: September 29, 2011 (aged 98) Chateau de Notre Dame in New Orleans, Louisiana, US
- Buried: Cathedral Basilica of Saint Louis
- Education: St. Charles College, Catonsville, Maryland; Sulpician Seminary
- Military career
- Branch: United States Army
- Service years: 1941-1945
- Unit: 82nd Airborne Division
- Conflicts: World War II; Normandy; Rhineland; Ardennes-Alsace; Central Europe

Philip Matthew Hannan (May 20, 1913 – September 29, 2011) was an American prelate of the Roman Catholic Church. He served as auxiliary bishop of the Archdiocese of Washington from 1956 to 1965 and as the eleventh archbishop of the Archdiocese of New Orleans in Louisiana from 1965 to 1988.

== Biography ==
=== Early life ===
Philip Hannan was born on May 20, 1913, in Washington, D.C. His father, Patrick Francis Hannan, immigrated to the United States at age 18 and was nicknamed "The Boss". His mother was Lillian Hannan. Patrick Hannan ran a plumbing business in the city.

Philip Hannan attended St. John's College High School in Washington. He captained the winning cadet company in his senior year there. Before his high school graduation, Hannan surprised his family by saying that, instead of applying to the U.S. Military Academy at West Point, he would enter the priesthood. Hannan then began college studies at St. Charles College in Catonsville, Maryland, and later at the Sulpician Seminary at the Catholic University of America in Washington, D.C.

Hannan graduated from Catholic University in 1936 with a master's degree. He then traveled to Rome to reside at the Pontifical North American College while studying in that city. He received a Licentiate of Theology from the Pontifical Gregorian University and later earned a Doctor of Canon Law degree from Catholic University.

=== Priesthood ===
While in Rome, Hannan was ordained a priest in Rome for the Archdiocese of Baltimore-Washington by Bishop Ralph Hayes on December 8, 1939.

In the summer of 1940, due to World War II, the U.S. Secretary of State ordered all American seminarians to leave Italy. Hannan later wrote a book, Rome: Living under the Axis, detailing his experiences under the Fascist Regime in Italy. After returning to Washington, the archdiocese assigned Hannan as curate at St. Thomas Aquinas Parish in Baltimore, Maryland.

=== World War II ===
After the American entry into World War II in December 1941, Hannan joined the United States Army. He was commissioned as an officer and chaplain to the 82nd Airborne Division. He ministered to the paratroopers during the fighting in the 1944 to 1945 Ardennes Offensive in Belgium. Hannan witnessed the 1945 liberation of starved prisoners at the Wöbbelin concentration camp in Ludwigslust, Germany. After his discharge from the army at the end of the war, Hannan served briefly as pastor of Cologne Cathedral Parish in Cologne, Germany, during the American occupation.

After returning to Washington, Hannan was assigned as an assistant pastor at Saint Mary Mother of God Parish in Washington. When Pope Pius XII split the Archdiocese of Washington from the Archdiocese of Baltimore on November 15, 1947, Hannan was incardinated, or transferred to the Archdiocese of Washington. In 1948, he was appointed vice chancellor of that archdiocese. While he was vice chancellor, Hannan met then US Congressman John F. Kennedy. For the next 14 years, Hannan would serve as an unofficial advisor to Kennedy on matters of religion and social justices.

In 1951, Hannan established the Catholic Standard in Washington and served as its editor-in-chief. Later that year, he was named chancellor of the archdiocese. Pius XII honored Hannan in 1952 by naming him a monsignor.

=== Auxiliary Bishop of Washington ===
Pius XII named Hannan on June 16, 1956. as an auxiliary bishop of Washington and titular bishop of Hieropolis; he was consecrated in the Cathedral of St. Matthew the Apostle in Washington on August 28, 1956. Hannan attended the Second Vatican Council in Rome during the early 1960s, where he served as a press officer.

Hannan was a sponsor of a fundraising committee organized by the Cuban Families Committee for Liberation of Prisoners of War, which sought to raise money to pay the ransom set by Fidel Castro for the release of those taken captive as a result of the Bay of Pigs Invasion. Hannan was in Rome in November 1963 when President Kennedy was assassinated in Dallas, Texas. After Hannan returned to Washington, the Kennedy family asked him to deliver the homily at the "low" or recited requiem mass. This responsibility normally fell to Archbishop Patrick O'Boyle, but he allowed Hannan to perform it.

=== Archbishop of New Orleans ===
On September 29, 1965, Pope Paul VI named Hannan as the eleventh archbishop of New Orleans, succeeding Archbishop John Cody. Hannan moved to New Orleans only weeks after Hurricane Betsy hit the city, and he became a spiritual leader during the rebuilding of both the city and the archdiocese. In New Orleans, he became a member of an anti-communist organization, the Information Council of the Americas (INCA).

Hannan presided over the archdiocese during a time of great change. The Second Vatican Council concluded on December 8, 1965, and Hannan led the effort to implement the council's policies of reform within the archdiocese. Hannan instituted a Social Apostolate program in 1966.He also reformed the archdiocesan Catholic Charities system, which now serves as the largest non-governmental social service agency in the New Orleans metropolitan area.

At the same time, the demographics of the city were changing, as Catholic whites moved to the suburbs, while Orleans Parish became increasingly Protestant. New churches and parishes were being built throughout the city, while attendance in inner-city churches declined. At a time when other swimming pools in the New Orleans area were racially segregated, he opened the pool at Notre Dame Seminary to the entire public.

In 1968, Hannan returned to Washington from New Orleans to deliver the graveside eulogy for Senator Robert F. Kennedy, who had been assassinated in Los Angeles. Pope John Paul II came to New Orleans in 1987, the first papal visit to the city. Hannan, who considered the visit the highlight of his tenure as archbishop, served as the pope's personal guide during the three-day visit.

=== Retirement ===
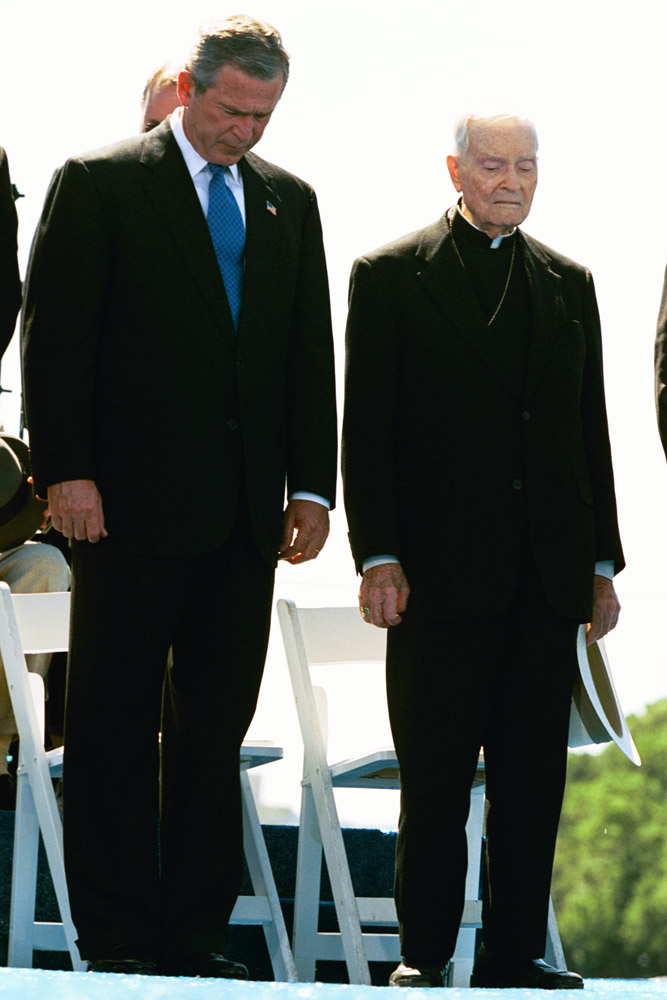
Hannan with US President George W. Bush (2004)

In May 1988, upon reaching his 75th birthday, Hannan submitted his resignation to the pope as archbishop of New Orleans. This resignation was accepted by John Paul II on December 6, 1988, when Hannan was succeeded as archbishop by Francis Schulte.

In 1994, Hannan offered graveside prayers at the interment of Jacqueline Kennedy Onassis in Arlington National Cemetery in Arlington, Virginia. When Hurricane Katrina landed in Louisiana in 2005, Hannan remained at the studio of the Catholic television station in Metairie to protect it from looting. In the aftermath of Katrina, Hannan participated in the clean-up effort.

In 2011, Hannan moved from his private residence in Covington, Louisiana to Chateau de Notre Dame, a skilled nursing facility in New Orleans, due to a series of strokes and other health problems.

=== Death and legacy ===
Philip Hannan died on September 29, 2011, at age 98 at Chateau de Notre Dame.

Hannan received numerous civic honors, including the most prestigious award presented to a New Orleans civic leader, The Times-Picayune Loving Cup.

The following places are named after Hannan:

- Hannan Hall at Catholic University of America
- Archbishop Hannan High School in Covington

== Viewpoints ==
=== Abortion rights ===
In 1996, Hannan publicly opposed the election of Democrat Mary Landrieu, a Roman Catholic whose family had been Hannan's longtime friends, to the United States Senate. Although stopping short of endorsing (or even mentioning) Landrieu's Republican opponent, Woody Jenkins, the retired archbishop had become concerned, as he explained, by the endorsement of Landrieu by Emily's List. Hannan's 1996 declaration has been cited as influential on later Catholic prelates involving themselves in politics by issuing warning statements about pro-abortion rights Catholic politicians and in barring them from communion.

On November 27, 2008, from his home in Covington, Hanna published his "Thanksgiving and Christmas Blessings" in the New Orleans Times-Picayune. The full-page announcement was mostly an anti-abortion appeal expressing particular concern over the potential threat that the "evil" Freedom of Choice Act might be passed into law by the incoming United States Congress and the administration of US President Barack Obama. The ad cited the 1973 Supreme Court decision Roe v. Wade and, quoting the United States Conference of Catholic Bishops, warns that "a bad court decision will be enshrined in bad legislation that is more radical than the decision itself."

=== Nuclear arms ===
Hannan was the leader of a minority of bishops who opposed the May 3, 1983, pastoral letter of the National Conference of Catholic Bishops entitled The Challenge of Peace: God's Promise and Our Response. The letter opposed the concept of nuclear deterrence and advocated a nuclear freeze with the Soviet Union.

== Honorary degrees ==
- Doctor of Laws, Catholic University of America (1987)
- Doctor of Laws Georgetown University

== Publications ==
The Archbishop Wore Combat Boots – From Combat, to Camelot, to Katrina: A Memoir of an Extraordinary Life by Archbishop Philip Hannan with Nancy Collins and Peter Finney Jr. ISBN 978-1-59276-697-0.

Catholic Church titles
Preceded by John Patrick Cardinal Cody	Archbishop of New Orleans; 1965–1988	Succeeded by Francis Bible Schulte
