= St. Joseph Cathedral (Baton Rouge, Louisiana) =

Historic church in Louisiana, United States

- U.S. National Register of Historic Places
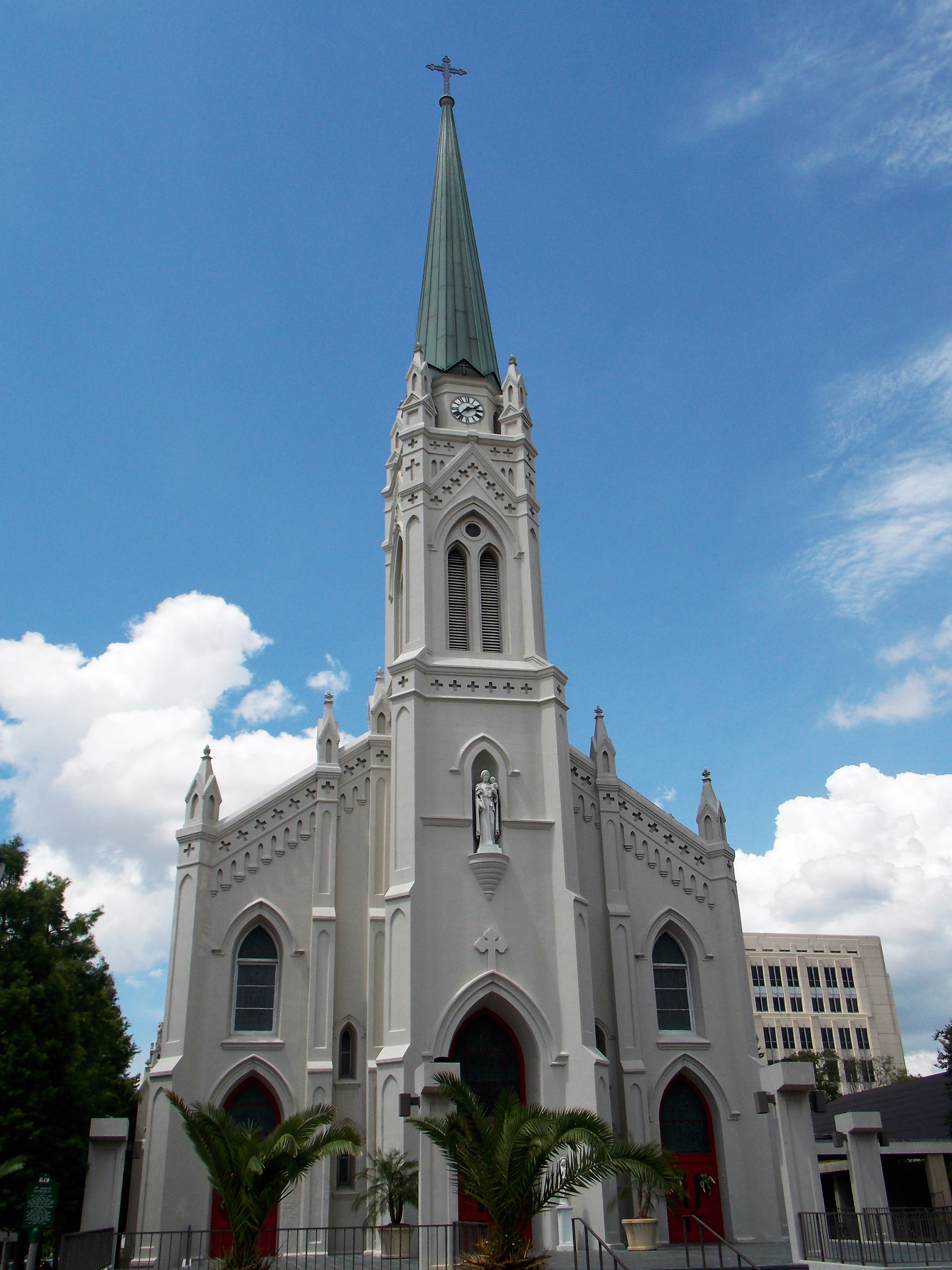

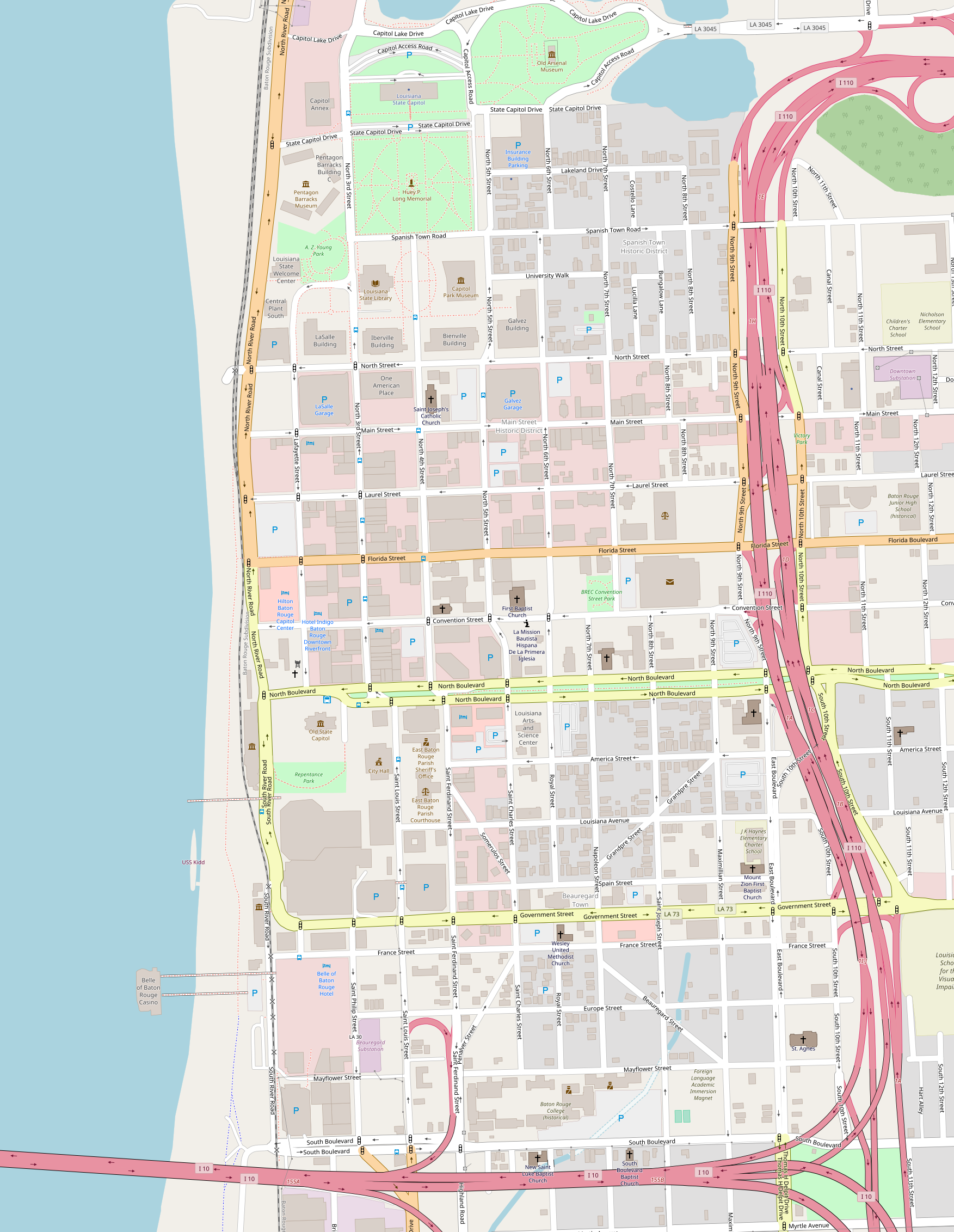
- Location within Baton Rouge Downtown
- Location: 401 Main Street, Baton Rouge, Louisiana
- Coordinates: 30°27′07″N 91°11′13″W
- Area: less than one acre
- Built: 1853-1856
- Architect: Father John Cambiaso
- Architectural style: Gothic Revival
- NRHP reference No.: 90000502
- Added to NRHP: March 22, 1990

St. Joseph Cathedral is a Catholic cathedral located in downtown Baton Rouge, Louisiana, United States. It is the mother church of the Diocese of Baton Rouge, and it was listed on the National Register of Historic Places on March 22, 1990.

== History ==
St. Joseph Parish was founded as the Parroquia de Nuestra Señora de los Dolores in 1792; its name was changed some time after Louisiana became a State in 1812 as English became more and more the language of the population in Baton Rouge. The present church building, the Parish's third, was begun in 1853 and completed in 1856.

The church was designated the cathedral church of the Diocese of Baton Rouge by Pope John XXIII in the bull of erection "Peramplum Novae Aureliae" dated July 22, 1961; the erection of the diocese took place on November 8, 1961, with Most Rev. Robert Emmet Tracy as is first bishop. The church building underwent a significant interior renovation in 1967 and was re-dedicated on September 30, 1970.

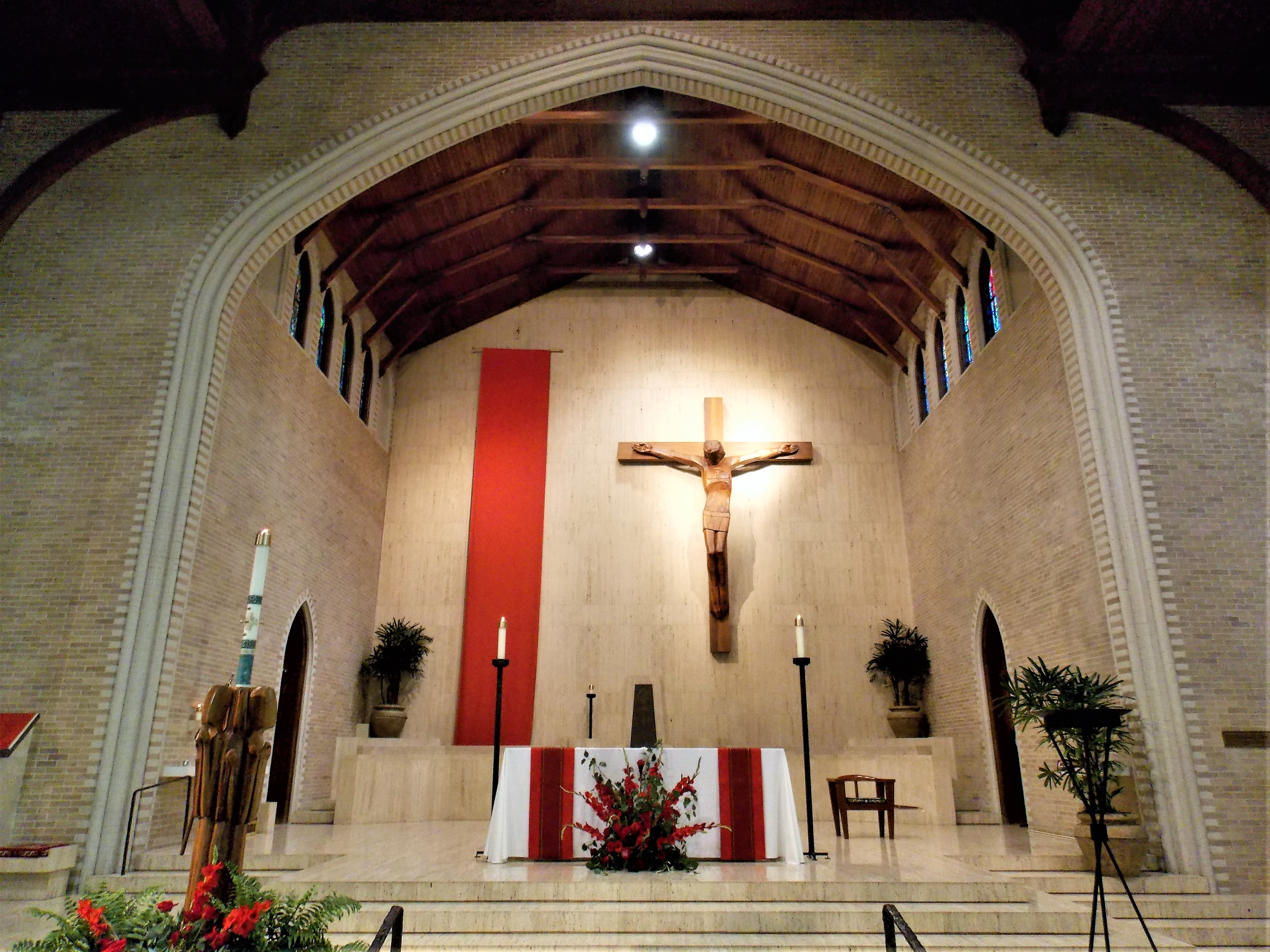
Cathedral interior

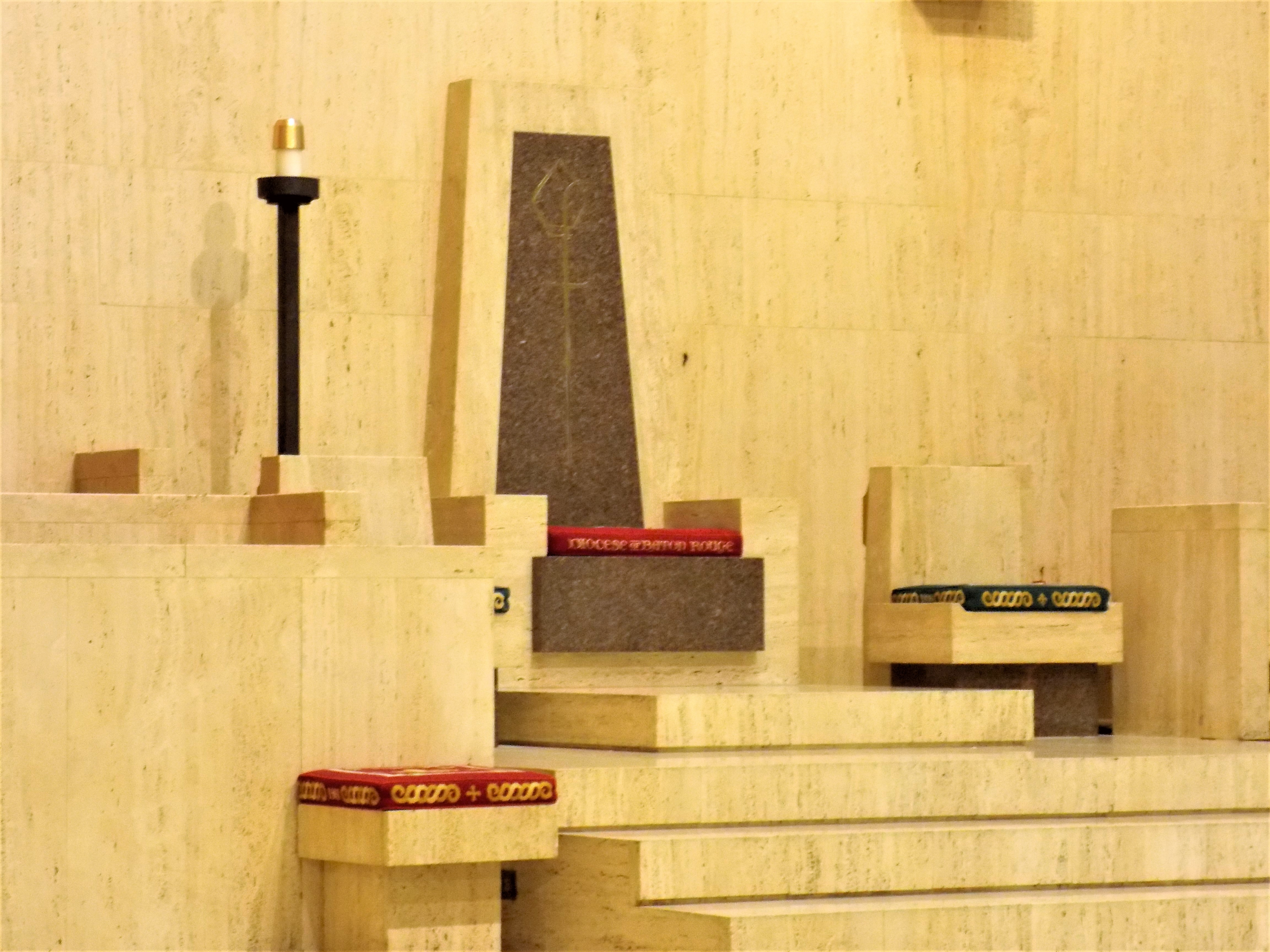
Cathedra

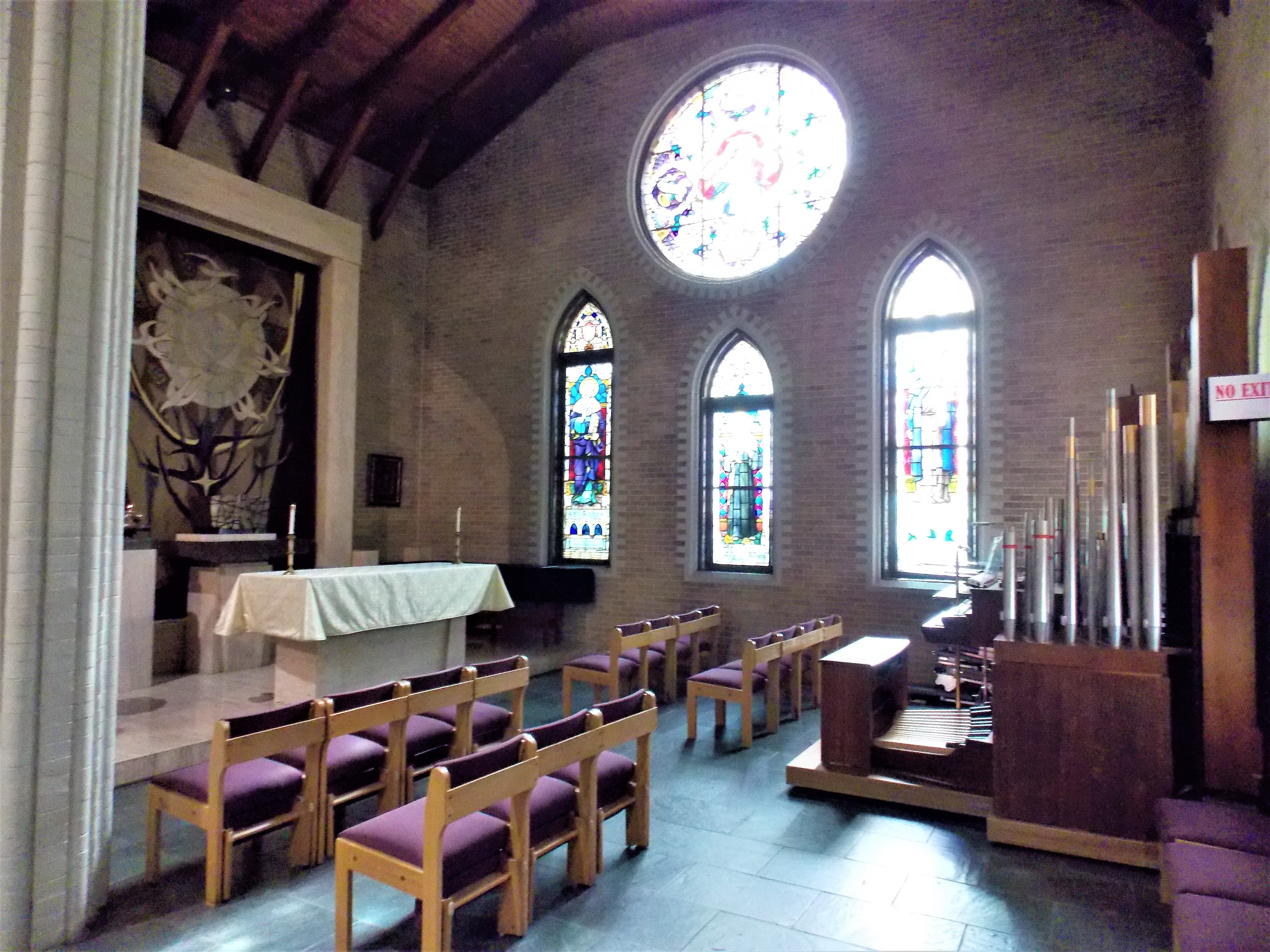
Chapel

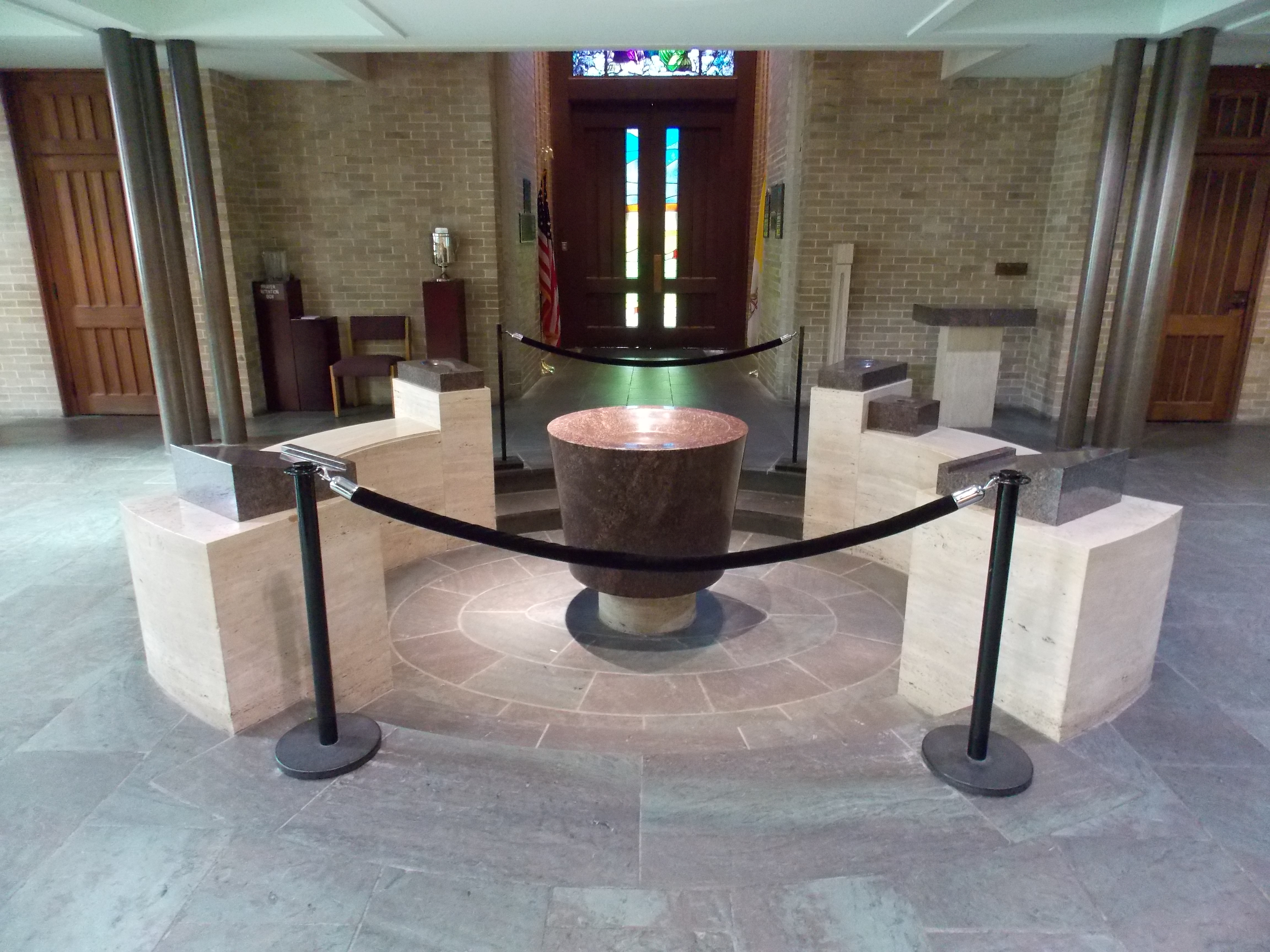
Baptismal font

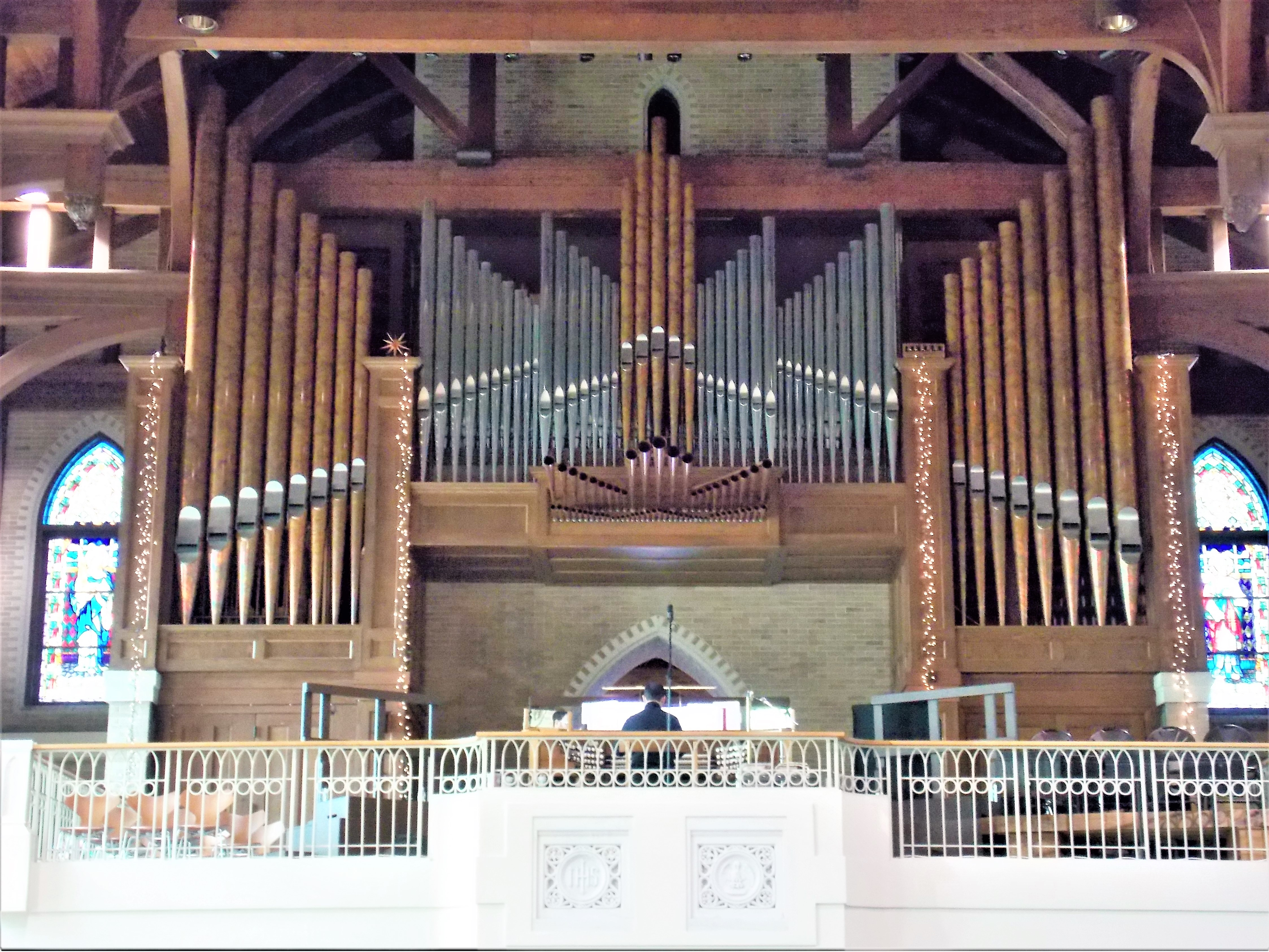
Pipe organ

== See also ==
- List of tallest buildings in Baton Rouge
- List of Catholic cathedrals in the United States
- List of cathedrals in the United States
- National Register of Historic Places listings in East Baton Rouge Parish, Louisiana
