= Simon Peter Engurait =

American Catholic prelate (born 1971)

His Excellency, The Most Reverend Simon Peter Engurait
- Bishop of Houma–Thibodaux
- Diocese: Houma-Thibodaux
- Appointed: June 5, 2025
- Installed: September 5, 2025
- Predecessor: Mario Dorsonville

Orders
- Ordination: May 25, 2013 by Sam Jacobs
- Consecration: September 5, 2025 by Gregory Michael Aymond, Shelton Fabre, and Sam Jacobs

Personal details
- Born: August 28, 1971 (age 55) Ngora, Uganda
- Education: St. Peter's College; Makerere University; Maastricht School of Management; Notre Dame Seminary
- Motto: In Deo tantum (Latin for 'Only in God')
- Styles
- Reference style: His Excellency; The Most Reverend
- Spoken style: Your Excellency
- Religious style: Bishop

Simon Peter Engurait (born August 28, 1971) is a Ugandan American Catholic prelate who serves as bishop of Houma-Thibodaux in Louisiana.

== Biography ==
=== Early life and education ===
Engurait was born on August 28, 1971, in Ngora, Uganda, the seventh of fourteen children. One of his siblings is a Catholic priest and another is a religious sister. He studied at St. Peter's College in Tororo and earned a bachelor's degree in political science and public administration from Makerere University in Kampala in 1995. Engurait then obtained a Master of Business Administration degree in 1999 from the Maastricht School of Management in Maastricht, Netherlands.

Personal arms of Simón Pedro Engurait

In 2007, deciding to become a priest, Engurait moved to the United States to study theology. He earned a Master of Divinity degree from Notre Dame Seminary in New Orleans, Louisiana, in 2013.

=== Priesthood ===
Engurait was ordained to the priesthood for the Diocese of Houma-Thibodaux at the Cathedral of St. Francis de Sales in Houma on May 25, 2013, by Bishop Sam Jacobs. After his ordination, the diocese assigned him as an associate pastor at the cathedral parish. He was transferred in 2015 to St. Genevieve Parish in Thibodaux. One year later, the diocese sent Engurait to serve at Christ the Redeemer Parish in Thibodaux. Engurait was appointed pastor of St. Bridget Parish in Schriever in January 2017.

==== Diocesan leadership ====
Bishop Shelton Fabre appointed Engurait as moderator of the curia in 2016. The next year, he was named vicar general of the diocese. Following the death of Bishop Mario Dorsonville in January 2024, Engurait was named diocesan administrator of the diocese. He served in this role until June 2025.

=== Bishop of Houma-Thibodaux ===
On June 5, 2025, Pope Leo XIV appointed Engurait as the sixth bishop of Houma-Thibodaux. He was consecrated at the Stopher Gymnasium of Nicholls State University in Thibodaux on September 5, 2025 by Archbishop Gregory Michael Aymond.

=== Personal life ===
Engurait speaks English, Ateso, Kiswahili, and Spanish. He states that he has been deeply influenced by Cajun culture.

== See also ==
- Ugandan Americans

== Episcopal succession ==
Catholic Church titles
Preceded by Mario Dorsonville	Bishop of Houma–Thibodaux; 2025-present	Incumbent
