= Cathedral of St. Francis de Sales (Houma, Louisiana) =

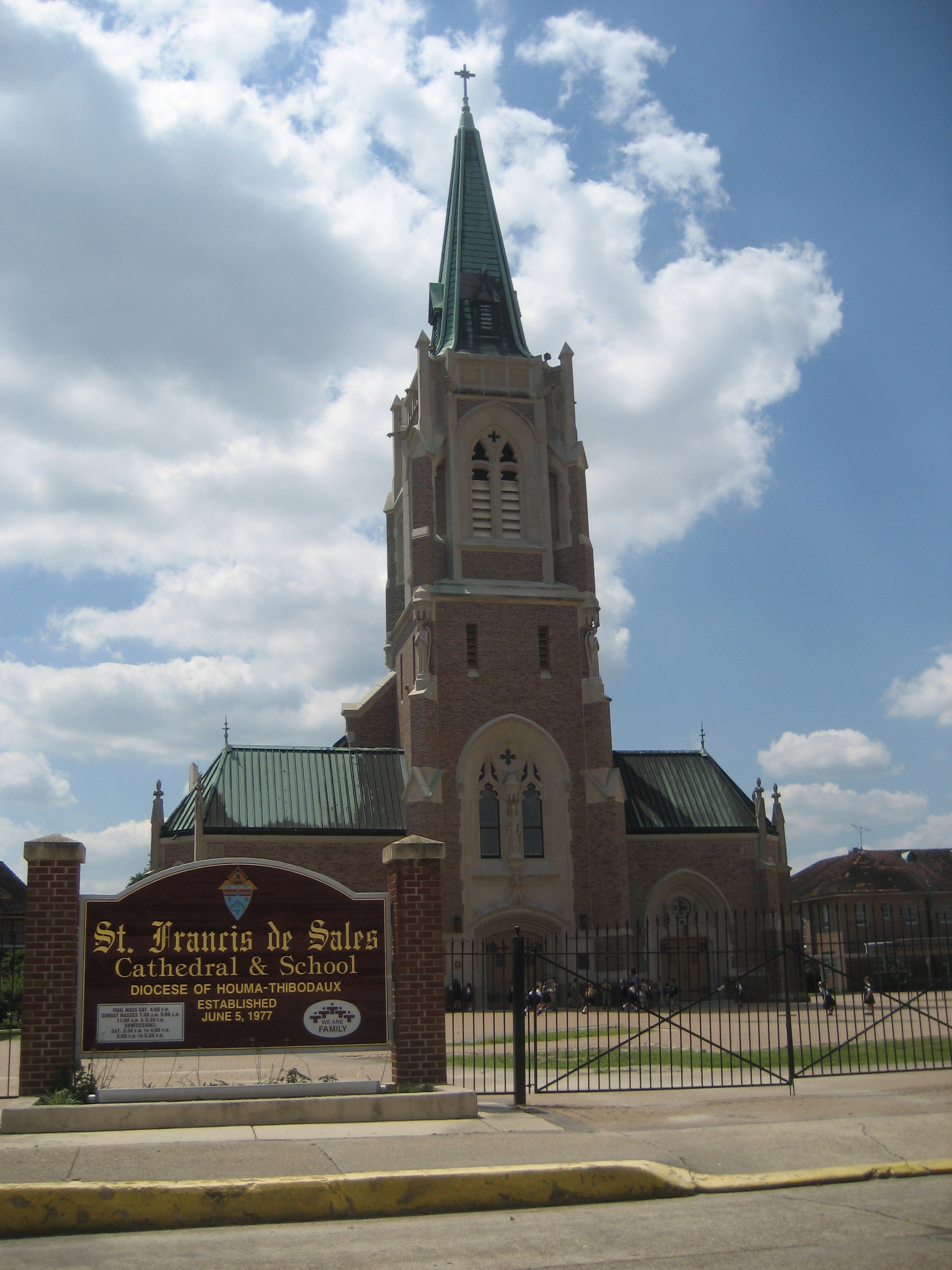

- Location in Louisiana
- 29°35′41″N 90°43′22″W
- Location: 500 Goode St. Houma, Louisiana
- Country: United States
- Denomination: Roman Catholic Church
- Website: www.stfrancisdesaleshouma.org

History
- Founded: 1847
- Consecrated: 1938

Architecture
- Style: Gothic Revival
- Completed: 1938

Specifications
- Materials: Brick, Copper

Administration
- Diocese: Houma-Thibodaux

Clergy
- Bishop: Most Rev. Simon Peter Engurait
- Rector: Very Rev. Jay Baker S.T.L.
- Vicar: Rev. Davis Ahimbisibwe

The Cathedral of St. Francis de Sales is a Catholic cathedral located in Houma, Louisiana, United States. Along with St. Joseph Co-Cathedral in Thibodaux it is the seat of the Diocese of Houma-Thibodaux.

== History ==
St. Francis de Sales Parish was founded around 1847 by the Rev. Zéphyrin Lévêque. Mass was initially celebrated in the Terrebonne Parish courthouse. The first church building was completed in 1848 and construction on the present church was begun in 1936 under the direction of the Rev. August Vandebilt.

While the first St. Francis de Sales church was built in the Romanesque style in 1848, The current building was built as the parish Church of St. Francis de Sales in 1938 as the original structure was damaged by a Hurricane in the 1920s. The current building was made possible by the generosity of the Rev. August Vandebilt.

The Sisters of the Marianites of the Holy Cross arrived at the parish church in 1870 to begin the first Catholic School in Terrebonne Parish, Louisiana. The sisters lived in a convent that was built for them on the church grounds. During the first 20 years of the Sister's stay in Houma they taught at the predecessor to St. Francis School, the Houma Academy, which was located on Point Street, and only instructed girls. It wasn't until 1890 that the Sisters founded a school for the boys. The two storied wooden school was situated on the same ground that the present day Youth Center/Gymnasuim and Rectory stands. The current school which houses grades k-7 and is co-ed was built to replace both schools and was completed in 1951 at a cost of over $600,000. The previous Houma Academy began to operate as a boys high school until the completion of Houma Central Catholic High School in 1965. The School was renamed in 1966 to Vandebilt Catholic High School to honor the late Fr. August Vandebilt's commitment to Catholic Education in the area. The Sister's long history at the Cathedral parish and school sadly came to a close in 2011 as the last religious sister, Sr. Immaculata Paisant, Superintendent of Catholic Schools for the Diocese of Houma-Thibodaux retired from her position and returned to the motherhouse in New Orleans, LA. While their presence has faded their legacy and dedication will forever mold the schools identity.

The current church plant includes the main church building, the youth center and gymnasium, the convent, the school, the rectory and the historic cemetery, St. Francis de Sales Cemetery #1. There is a second cemetery located on Main Street that is under the care of the cathedral parish by the name of St. Francis de Sales Cemetery #2 The currently unoccupied convent is undergoing renovation by the Diocesan office of Vocations to serve as a Vocations resource center.

The Cathedral Parish hosts a variety of ministries including a local chapter of the Knights of Columbus, a fraternal organization for Catholic men. The local chapter, Council 1317, was the founding council in Terrebonne Parish and most other councils have formed from the central council in Houma. The Current Grand Knight is Kell Luke. The organisation is the world's largest Catholic Fraternal Charitable organization in the world and is open to all Catholic Men in good standing with the Holy See.

On March 2, 1977 Pope Paul VI established the Diocese of Houma-Thibodaux. St. Francis de Sales Church was elevated to the rank of cathedral and became the seat of the newly created Diocese.

== Bishops ==
Bishop Warren Boudreaux, the first Bishop of the Diocese of Houma-Thibodaux is interred under the marble raised altar near the Statue of the Blessed Mother. Bishop Michael Jarrel was the second bishop of the Diocese of Houma-Thibodaux and reigned from this cathedral for a decade from March 4, 1993, until October 10, 2003. Pope John Paul II named Bishop Sam G. Jacobs as the third bishop of the Diocese of Houma-Thibodaux, he took hold of this cathedral on October 10, 2003, and again reigned for just over a decade when he was granted retirement on October 30, 2013. Pope Francis appointed Bishop Shelton Fabre, previously auxiliary to the Archbishop of New Orleans as the fourth bishop of the Diocese of Houma-Thibodaux. Pope Francis appointed Bishop Mario E. Dorsonville, previously auxiliary to the Archdiocese of Washington, as the fifth bishop of the Diocese of Houma-Thibodaux.

== See also ==
- List of Catholic cathedrals in the United States
- List of cathedrals in the United States
