= Cathedral of the Most Sacred Heart of Jesus (Knoxville, Tennessee) =

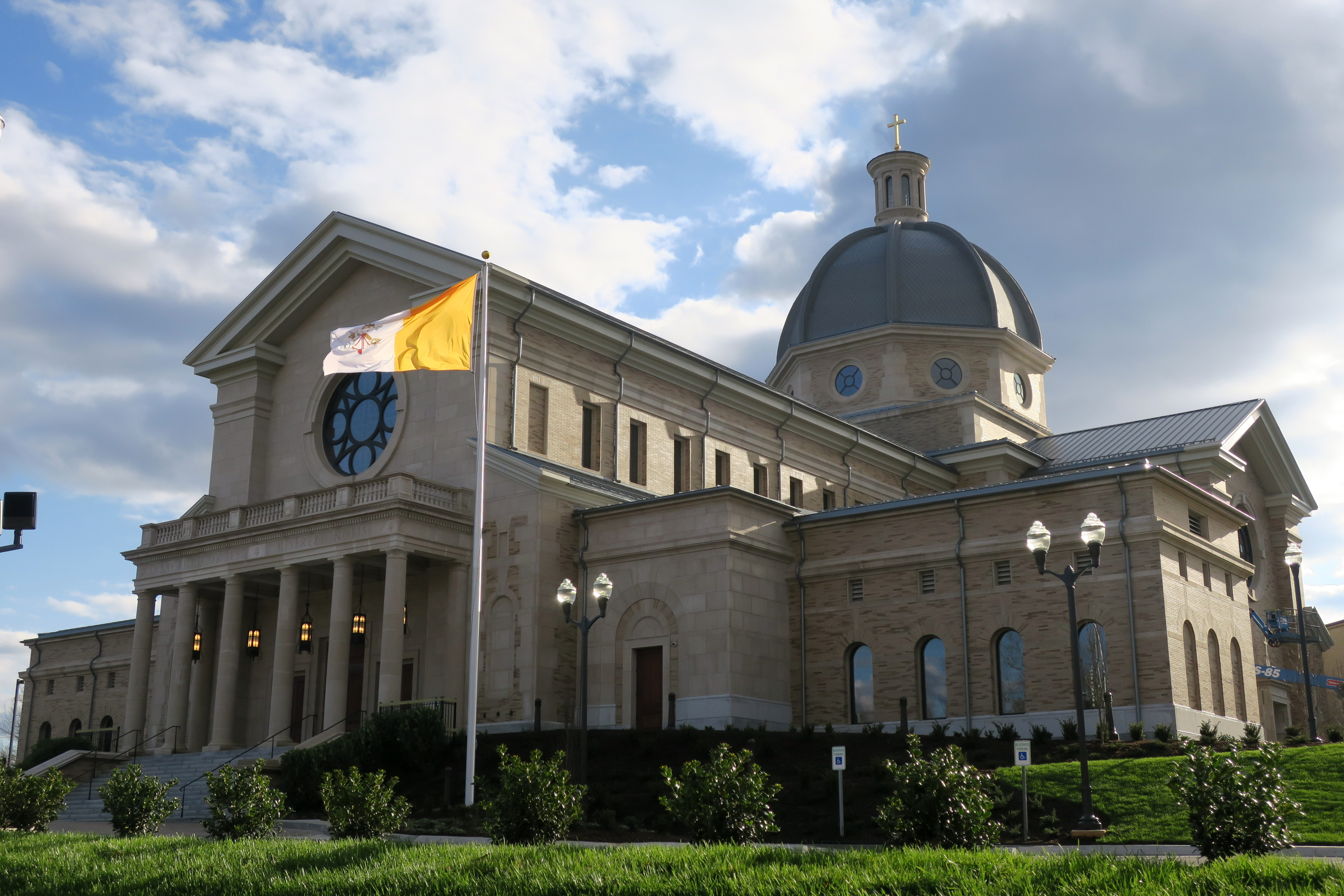
- Cathedral of the Most Sacred Heart of Jesus

- Location in Tennessee Cathedral of the Most Sacred Heart of Jesus (the United States)
- 35°55′33″N 84°00′02″W
- Location: 711 S. Northshore Dr. Knoxville, Tennessee
- Country: United States
- Denomination: Roman Catholic Church
- Website: www.shcathedral.org

History
- Founded: 1956
- Dedication: Sacred Heart of Jesus
- Dedicated: March 3, 2018

Architecture
- Functional status: Cathedral/Parish church
- Architect(s): BarberMcMurry, McCrery Architects
- Architectural type: Renaissance Revival
- Groundbreaking: April 19, 2015
- Completed: 2018

Specifications
- Capacity: 1,358
- Materials: Indiana limestone Brick

Administration
- Diocese: Knoxville

Clergy
- Bishop: Most Rev. James Mark Beckman
- Rector: Rev. David Boettner

The Cathedral of the Most Sacred Heart of Jesus is a cathedral and parish church located in Knoxville, Tennessee, United States. It is the seat of the Catholic Diocese of Knoxville.

Sacred Heart Parish, the predecessor to the cathedral parish, was erected in 1956 and its church opened that same year. After the diocese of Knoxville was created in 1988, Sacred Heart Church became Sacred Heart Cathedral. In 2018, the diocese dedicated a new cathedral building, Cathedral of the Most Sacred Heart of Jesus.

== History ==
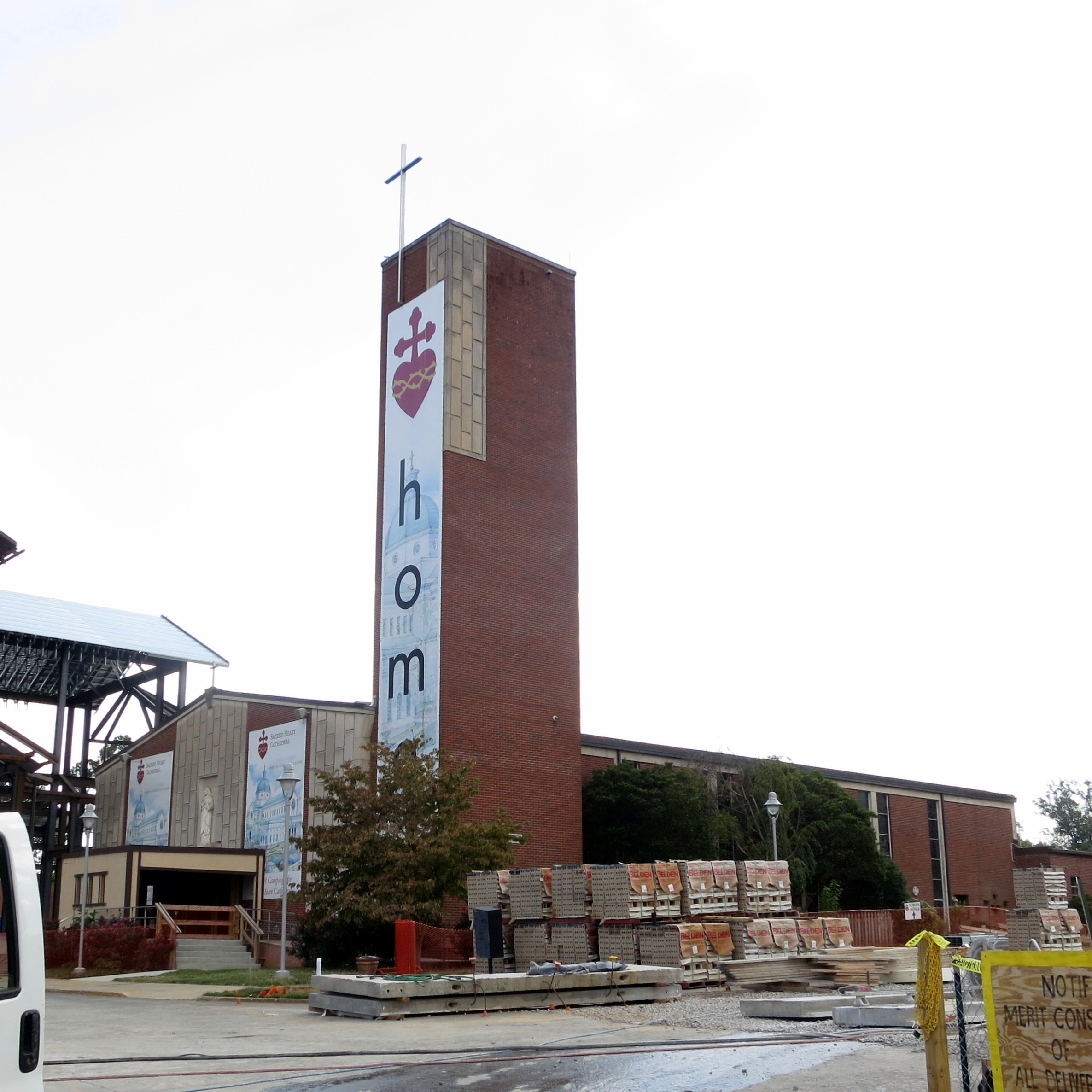
Former Sacred Heart Cathedral (2016)

=== Sacred Heart Parish ===
In 1952, when Knoxville was still part of the Diocese of Nashville, Bishop William Adrian and other Catholic leaders in the area decided that the city needed a third parish. The diocese in 1953 purchased six acres of a farm near Northshore Drive for that purpose. Reverend Edward Dolan of Immaculate Conception Parish hired Baumann and Baumann Architects of Knoxville to design a church, school, rectory, and convent for that property for $1 million.

Sacred Heart Parish was erected on January 1, 1956, with 199 families, with Dolan named as its first pastor. Sacred Heart School opened in September 1956, with an enrollment of 132 students and five faculty members. The rectory was completed in November of that year and the church dedicated in December 1956.

Between 1972 and 1981, the parish added a gymnasium, library and new classrooms to the Sacred Heart School. A kindergarten, science labs, computer labs, and an art department were added during the early 1980s.

=== Sacred Heart Cathedral ===
Pope John Paul II erected the Diocese of Knoxville in 1988. At that time Sacred Heart became Sacred Heart Cathedral. By 2016, the cathedral parish had 1,600 families as members, with an approximate enrollment of 700 children at Sacred Heart Cathedral School.

By the 2010s, the diocese had begun planning for a new, larger cathedral. The diocese chose the Knoxville architectural firm of BarberMcMurry and the design architecture firm McCrery Architects to design the new facility. The plan was to construct it on the campus of the current cathedral. The groundbreaking was held on April 19, 2015.

=== Cathedral of the Most Sacred Heart of Jesus ===
The new Cathedral of the Most Sacred Heart of Jesus was dedicated on March 3, 2018. The project cost was $30.8 million Seating capacity was increased from 580 in the old cathedral to 1,358. The former Sacred Heart Cathedral was converted into the parish fellowship hall.

The pipe organ for Most Sacred Heart was installed in 2024. It was constructed by Casavant Frères of Saint-Hyacinthe, Quebec.

== Cathedral exterior ==
The worship space went from 7,500 square feet (700 m^{2}) in the old cathedral to 28,000 square feet (2,600 m^{2}) in the new facility

=== Dome ===
The central dome, inspired by the Cathedral of Saint Mary of the Flower in Florence, Italy, rises to a height of 144 feet (44 m). The dome's interior features images of the Sacred Heart of Jesus and his Twelve Apostles.

=== Facade ===
The exterior of the cruciform structure is clad in Indiana limestone and Roman-style bricks from Ohio. Seventeen types of marble were used in the interior.

== Cathedral Interior ==
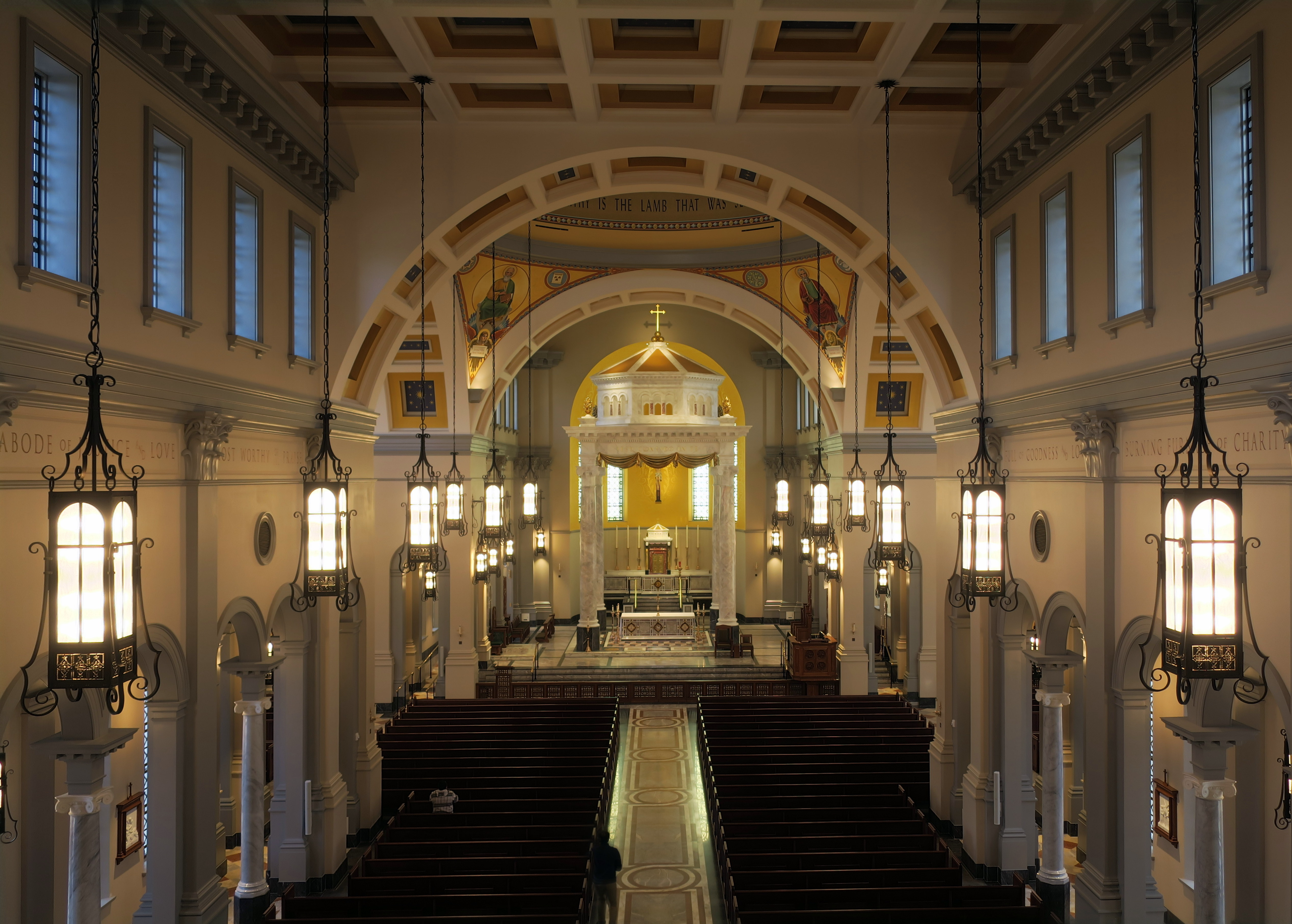
Interior, Cathedral of the Most Sacred Heart of Jesus Cathedral (2018)

=== Altar ===
The cathedral altar measures 10 feet (3.0 m) and is constructed of Michelangelo Statuario marble from Italy.The mensa, or top, of the altar weighs 2,500 pounds (1,100 kg) and has five crosses carved into it. Inside the altar is the reliquary, the container for relics. The front of the altar displays three medallions:

- An angel carrying the signs of alpha and omega
- A lamb perched on a scroll bearing seven seals
- A angel with the chi-rho symbol

=== Cathedra ===
The cathedra, or bishop's chair, is 5 feet (1.5 m) tall and is constructed of white oak with marble inlays in the trim. It is mounted on a marble platform that displays the bishops personal coat of arms.

=== Pendentives ===
The interior of the dome is partially supported by four triangle-shaped pendentives. Each pendentive display an image of one of the four evangelists:

- Matthew – depicted with a winged man, along with a star of David and a census roll
- Mark – shown with a winged lion along with a shell and a barren fig tree
- Luke – depicted with an ox, paints and brush, and an icon of the Virgin Mary with the infant Jesus
- John – accompanied by an eagle, a bunch of grapes and a crucifix

=== Tabernacle ===
The tabernacle is the container for the Blessed Sacrament in the cathedral. Constructed in the Netherlands over 100 years ago, it is constructed of bronze and marble. It weighs over 500 pounds (230 kg). Images of grapes and wheat stalks are depicted on the bronze doors of the tabernacle. A marble ciborium, or canopy, supported by two columns of Gallo Siena marble from Italy, is mounted over the tabernacle.

== Columbarium ==
The cathedral's outdoor space contains a columbarium, with burial spaces.

- Bishop Richard Stika (1957–2026)

== See also ==
- List of Catholic cathedrals in the United States
- List of cathedrals in the United States
- Diocese of Knoxville
