= Diocese of Knoxville =

Latin Catholic jurisdiction in the US

Coordinates: 35°58′22″N 83°56′32″W

Diocese of Knoxville Dioecesis Knoxvillensis
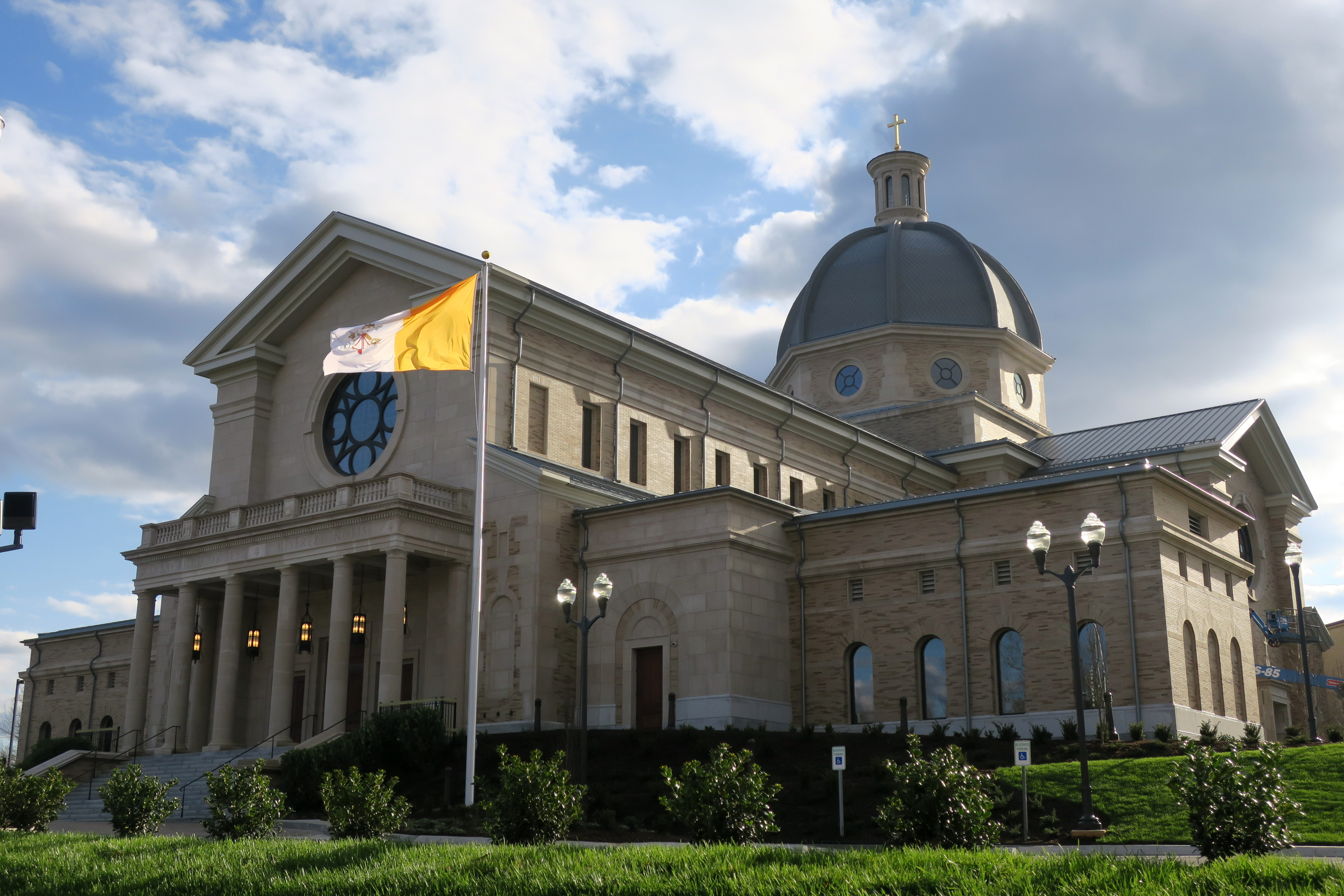
- Most Sacred Heart of Jesus Cathedral

- Coat of arms

Location
- Country: United States
- Territory: East Tennessee
- Ecclesiastical province: Louisville

Statistics
- Area: 14,242 sq mi (36,890 km^{2})
- Population: Total; Catholics: (as of 2023); 2,538,437; 71,208 (2.8%)

Information
- Denomination: Catholic
- Sui iuris church: Latin Church
- Rite: Roman Rite
- Established: May 27, 1988 (38 years ago)
- Cathedral: Cathedral of the Most Sacred Heart of Jesus
- Patron saint: Nativity of the Blessed Virgin Mary

Current leadership
- Pope: Leo XIV
- Bishop: James Mark Beckman
- Metropolitan Archbishop: Shelton Fabre
- Vicar General: Peter Iorio

Map
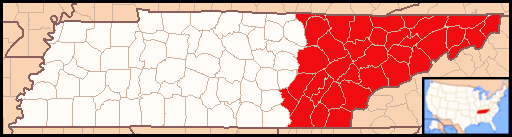

Website
- dioknox.org

The Diocese of Knoxville (Latin: Dioecesis Knoxvillensis) is a diocese of the Catholic Church in eastern Tennessee in the United States. Founded in 1988, it is a suffragan diocese of the metropolitan Archdiocese of Louisville. The see church is the Cathedral of the Most Sacred Heart of Jesus in Knoxville. The diocese is one of the fastest growing ones in the United States.

== Demographics ==
The Diocese of Knoxville covers most of East Tennessee In addition to the see city of Knoxville, the diocese includes Chattanooga and Johnson City.

As of 2026, there were an estimated 82,000 Catholics within the diocese, which covers approximately 14,000 square miles (36,000 km^{2}).They were served by 93 priests and 104 deacons.

== History ==
=== 1800 to 1900 ===
In 1808, Pope Pius VII erected the Diocese of Bardstown, a huge diocese in the American South and Midwest. The new state of Tennessee was part of this diocese. The Diocese of Nashville was erected on July 28, 1837, taking all of Tennessee from the Diocese of Bardstown. The Knoxville area would remain part of the Diocese of Nashville for the next 166 years.

With the construction of railroads in Tennessee in the 1840s, Irish Catholic immigrants started moving into the Knoxville area. Sts. Peter and Paul, the first parish in Chattanooga, was erected in 1851. Bishop Richard Niles of Nashville erected Immaculate Conception Parish in 1855, the first parish in Knoxville.

=== 1900 to 2000 ===
In 1930, the Sisters of Mercy opened St. Mary's Hospital in Knoxville.Pope John Paul II erected the Diocese of Knoxville in 1988, taking its territory from the Diocese of Nashville. Anthony O'Connell of the Diocese of Jefferson City was the first bishop. He was selected in 1998 as bishop of the Diocese of Palm Beach. The next bishop of Knoxville was Joseph Kurtz of the Diocese of Allentown, beginning in 1999.

=== 2000 to 2020 ===
Kurtz went on to be archbishop of the Archdiocese of Louisville in 2007. The third bishop of Knoxville was Richard Stika from the Archdiocese of St. Louis, named by Benedict XVI in 2009. That year, the Vatican elevated Sts. Peter and Paul Church to a minor basilica.

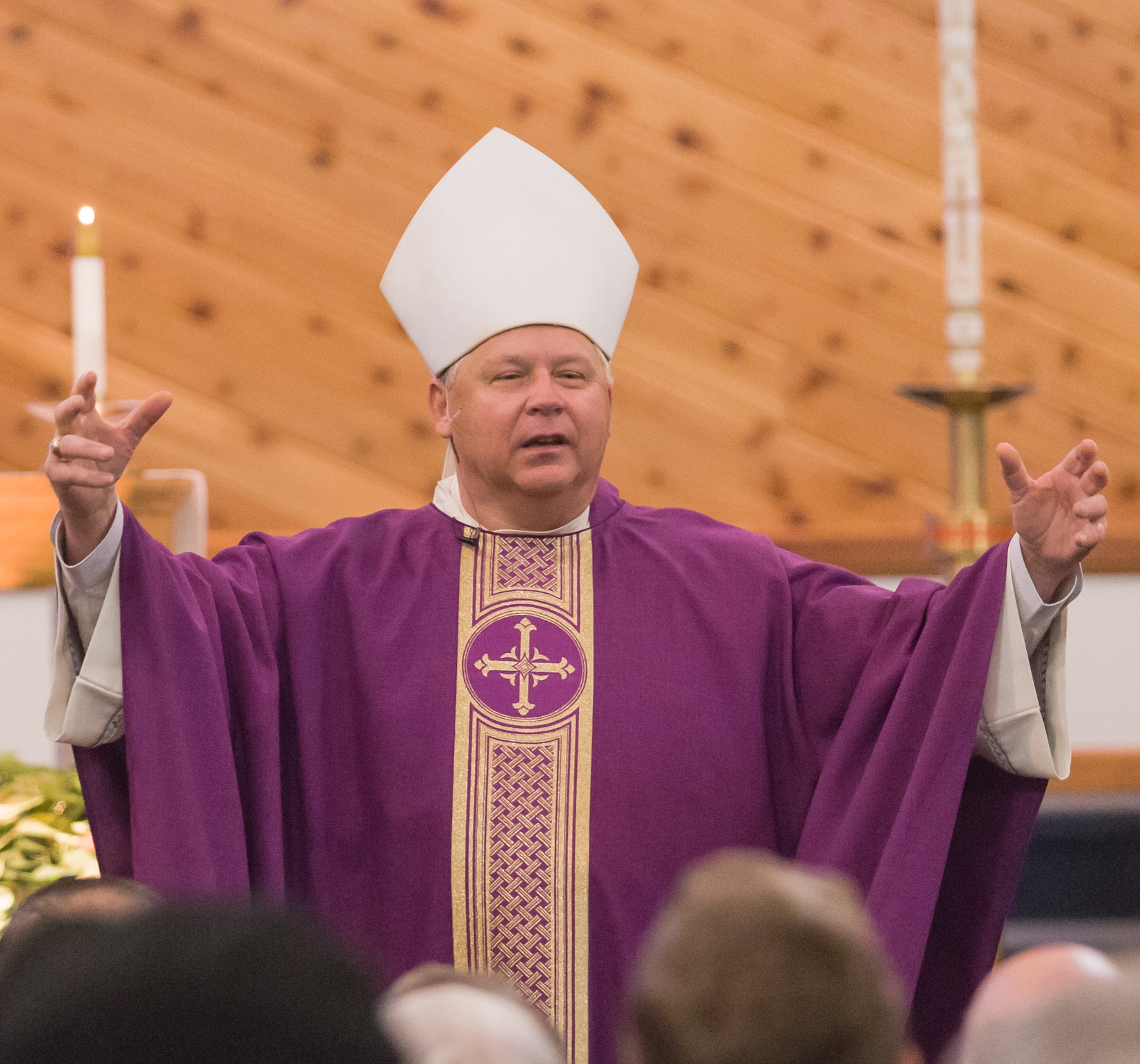
Bishop Stika (2016)

In September 2014, Stika initiated fundraising to construct a new cathedral in Knoxville. Stika dedicated the new Cathedral of the Most Sacred Heart of Jesus on March 3, 2018. In 2016, the diocese began a cause of canonization of Patrick Ryan, a priest who served in Chattanooga in 1870s.

=== 2020 to present ===
In 2021, the diocese transferred Ryan's remains from Mount Olivet Cemetery in Chattanooga to the Basilica of Sts. Peter and Paul.

Public masses were suspended throughout the diocese in March 2020, in response to the COVID-19 pandemic. In May 2020, Stika ordered the resumption of masses with protocols to reduce spread of the virus.

In April 2021, an official from the Congregation for Bishops in Rome stated that it had received ten accusations against Stika under Vos estis lux mundi, a motu proprio, or document, issued by Pope Francis. The accusations alleged administrative misconduct, claiming that Stika impeded or restricted an investigation into accusations of sexual misconduct against Wojciech Sobczuk, a Polish seminarian. The official stated it was likely that the Congregation would authorize Archbishop Joseph Kurtz of Louisville to investigate the accusations.

In May 2021, a group of diocesan priests and employees alleged that Stika had taken funds from diocesan education and employee benefit funds, including loan money from the 2020 Paycheck Protection Program, to help pay for the $36 million cathedral. One anonymous priest said "we are nearly bankrupt... there's just not going to be cash there."

Also in May 2021, eleven diocesan priests, roughly 20 percent of the presbyterate, wrote to the apostolic nuncio for the United States, Archbishop Christophe Pierre. They requested that the Vatican provide the diocese with "merciful relief" from Stika's leadership.

Stika's retirement was accepted by Pope Francis in June 2023. Stika said that he had sought early retirement due to health issues and denied claims that the Vatican forced him out.That same month, Francis appointed Archbishop Shelton Fabre of Louisville as apostolic administrator for the diocese. In May 2024, Francis named James Mark Beckman of Nashville as the fourth bishop of Knoxville.After Hurricane Helene caused massive destruction in East Tennessee in October 2024, Beckman said that the diocesan Catholic Charities branch was working to help survivors.

=== Sexual abuse cases ===
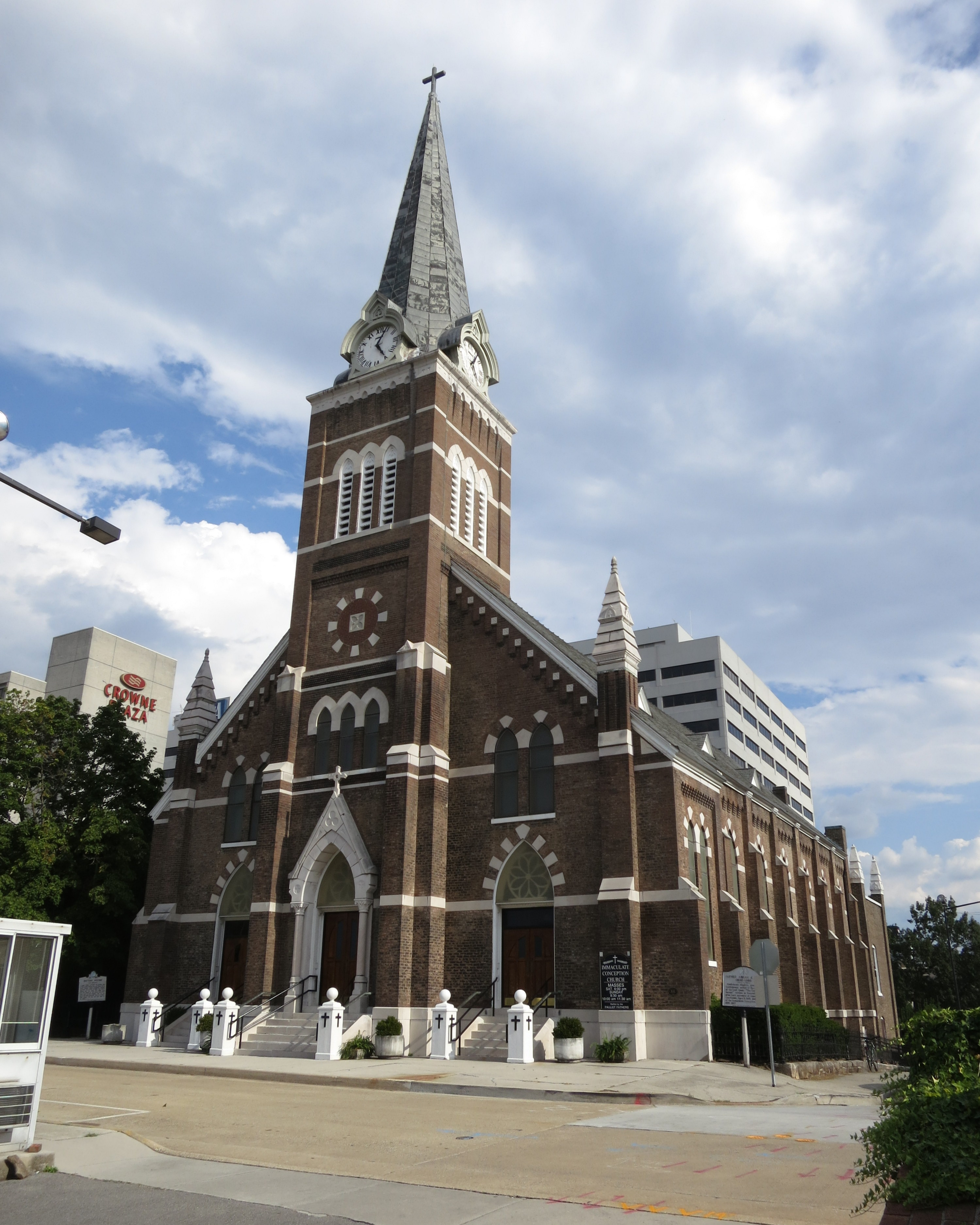
Immaculate Conception Church, Knoxville, Tennessee (2016)

In 2010, Stika revoked the ministerial privileges of William Casey, a priest assigned to St. Dominic Catholic Parish in Kingsport. Warren Tucker had accused Casey of raping him during the 1970s, starting when he was an 11-year-old altar boy. When confronted with these accusations, Casey admitted his crimes to diocesan officials. Casey was convicted of first-degree sexual misconduct and aggravated rape in 2011 and sentenced to 30 years in prison. The Vatican laicized Casey in 2013.

In February 2021, a male organist at Sacred Heart Cathedral sued the diocese, alleging that he had been raped at his home in February 2019 by Wojciech Sobczuk, a Polish seminarian. The Jesuit Order had dismissed Sobczuk in 2018 after receiving accusations of sexual misconduct at SS. Cyril and Methodius Seminary in Orchard Lake, Michigan. That same year, Stika invited Sobczuk to study in Knoxville for the priesthood and live at the bishop's rectory.

Shortly following the alleged rape of the organist, Stika sent Sobczuk to St. Meinrad Seminary in St. Meinrad, Indiana. However, St. Meinrad dismissed Sobczuk in February 2021 after receiving multiple new allegations of sexual misconduct. Sobczuk returned to Knoxville to live in the episcopal residence. Diocese officials appointed an independent investigator, but Stika later dismissed him. Stika hired another one, who only interviewed Sobczuk before closing the investigation.

In July 2022, the diocese successfully sought to de-anonymize the Sobczuk victim in court proceedings, going against prior diocesan policy regarding victim privacy. The diocese also attempted to place internal church documents under clergy-penitent privilege and the pontifical secret, going against Vatican instructions.

== Bishops ==
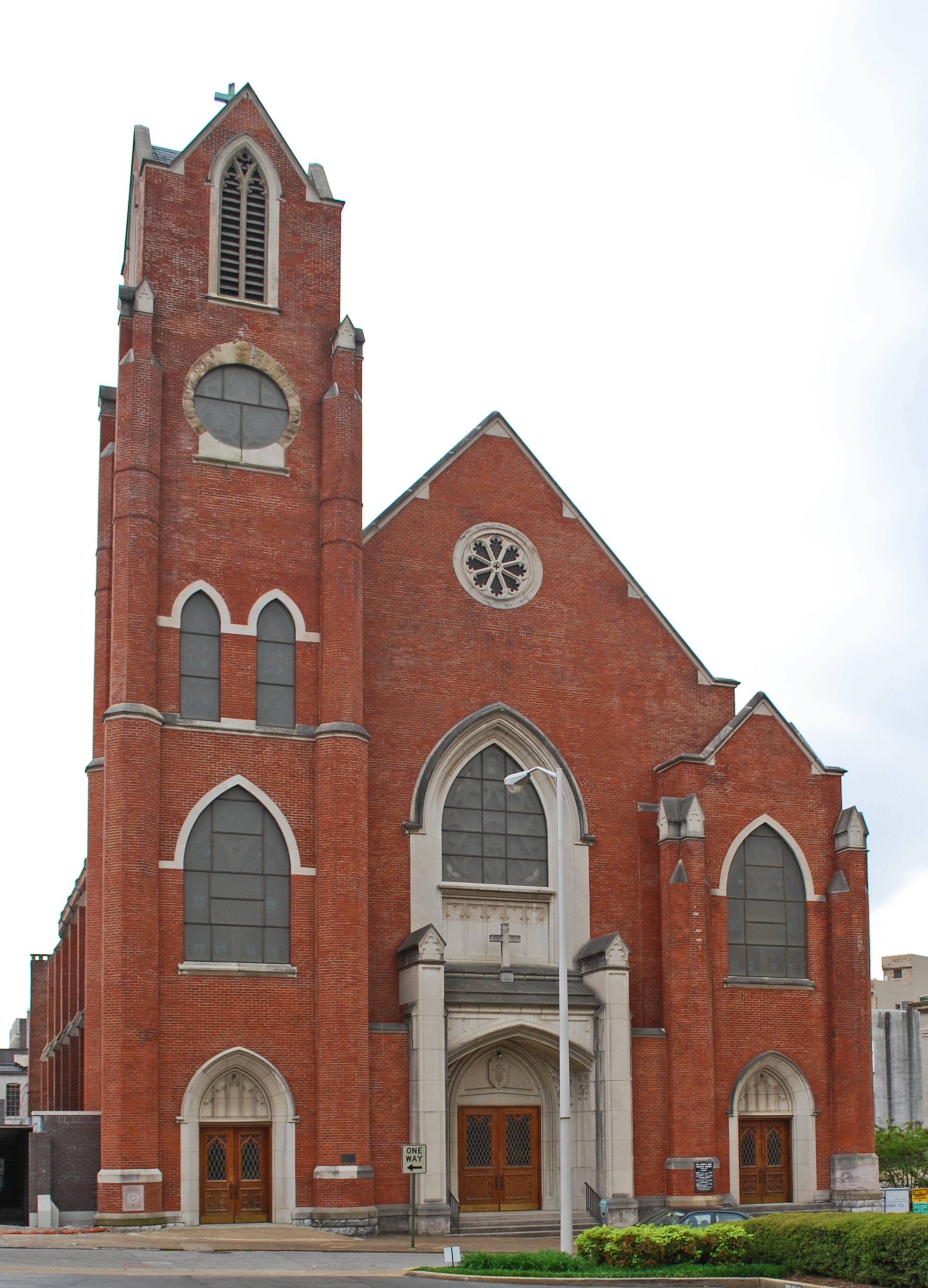
Basilica of Saints Peter and Paul, Chattanooga, Tennessee (2010)

=== Bishops of Knoxville ===
1. Anthony Joseph O'Connell (1988–1998), appointed Bishop of Palm Beach
2. Joseph Edward Kurtz (1999–2007), appointed Archbishop of Louisville
3. Richard Stika (2009–2023)
4. James Mark Beckman (2024–present)

=== Other diocesan priest who became bishop ===
- James Vann Johnston Jr. appointed Bishop of Springfield-Cape Girardeau and later Bishop of Kansas City-Saint Joseph

== Education ==
As of 2026, the Diocese of Knoxville had two high schools and eight elementary schools.

=== High schools ===
- Knoxville Catholic High School – Knoxville
- Notre Dame High School – Chattanooga

== Coat of arms ==
Coat of arms of Diocese of Knoxville
Notes The coat of arms was designed and adopted when the diocese was erected by Deacon Paul Sullivan. Adopted 1988 Escutcheon The arms of the diocese contains a large gold (or) cross with three small red (gules) crosses. The background of the arms is divided into quarters. They contain red and blue (azure) wavy lines, mountains, a dogwood blossom, a river and a railroad trestle. Symbolism The gold cross comes from the coat of arms of Pope John Paul II. The three red crosses represent the three Catholic dioceses in Tennessee. The mountains, the dogwood blossom and the river represent the scenery of East Tennessee. The trestle honors the Irish Catholic railroad workers in Tennessee history
