= Basilica of Sts. Peter and Paul (Chattanooga) =

Historic church in Chattanooga, Tennessee, United States

- Saints Peter and Paul Catholic Church and Buildings
- U.S. National Register of Historic Places
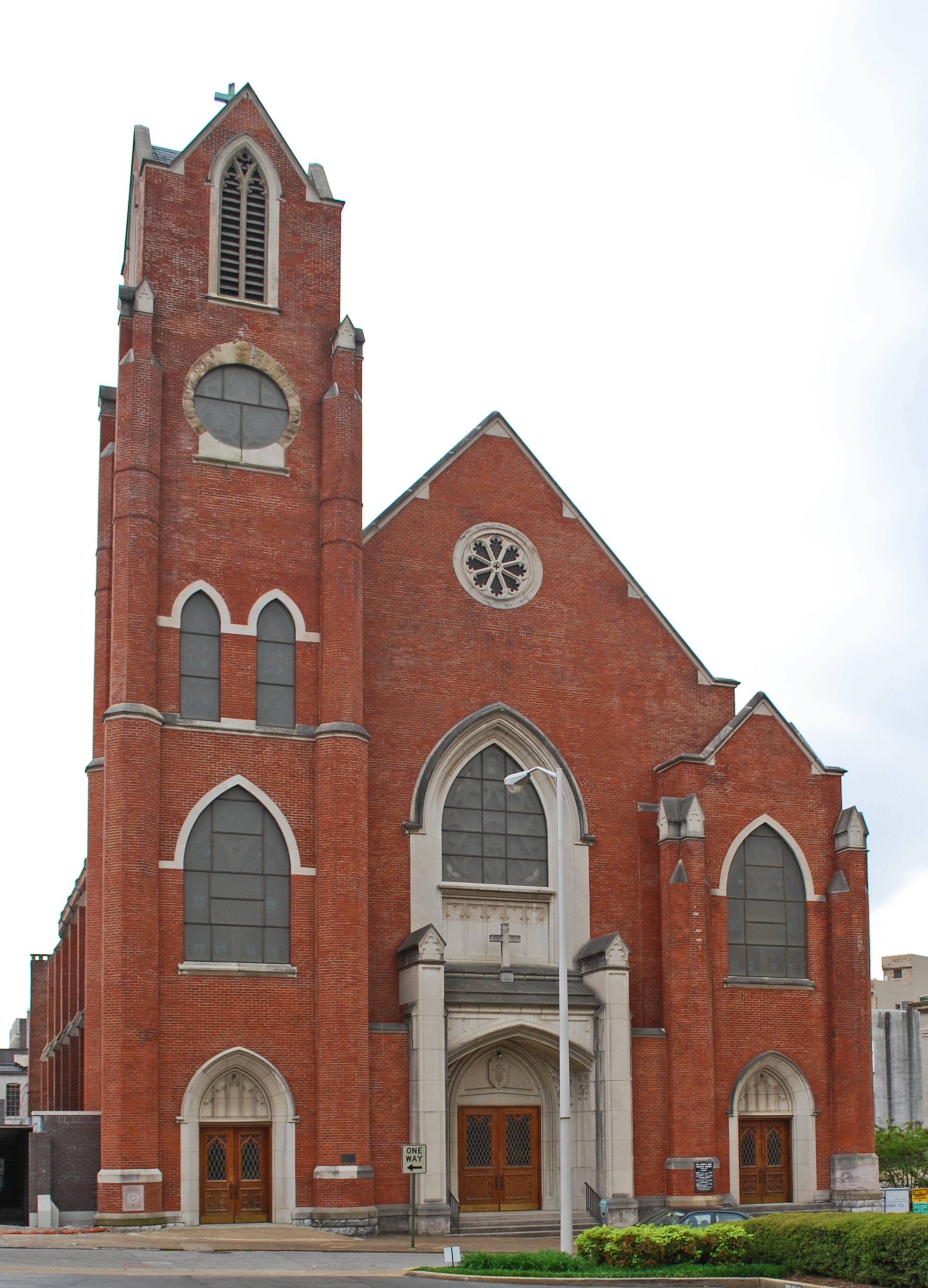

- Location within Tennessee Location within the United States
- Location: 214 E. 8th St., Chattanooga, Tennessee
- Coordinates: 35°2′47″N 85°18′23″W
- Area: 2.1 acres (0.85 ha)
- Built: 1888–1890
- Architect: Peter Dedericks, Jr.
- Architectural style: Gothic, Tudor Revival
- NRHP reference No.: 79002441
- Added to NRHP: December 11, 1979

The Basilica of Sts. Peter and Paul is a historic Catholic church at 214 E. 8th Street in Chattanooga, Tennessee. It is listed on the National Register of Historic Places and is one of the oldest continuing parishes in the Diocese of Knoxville.

== History ==
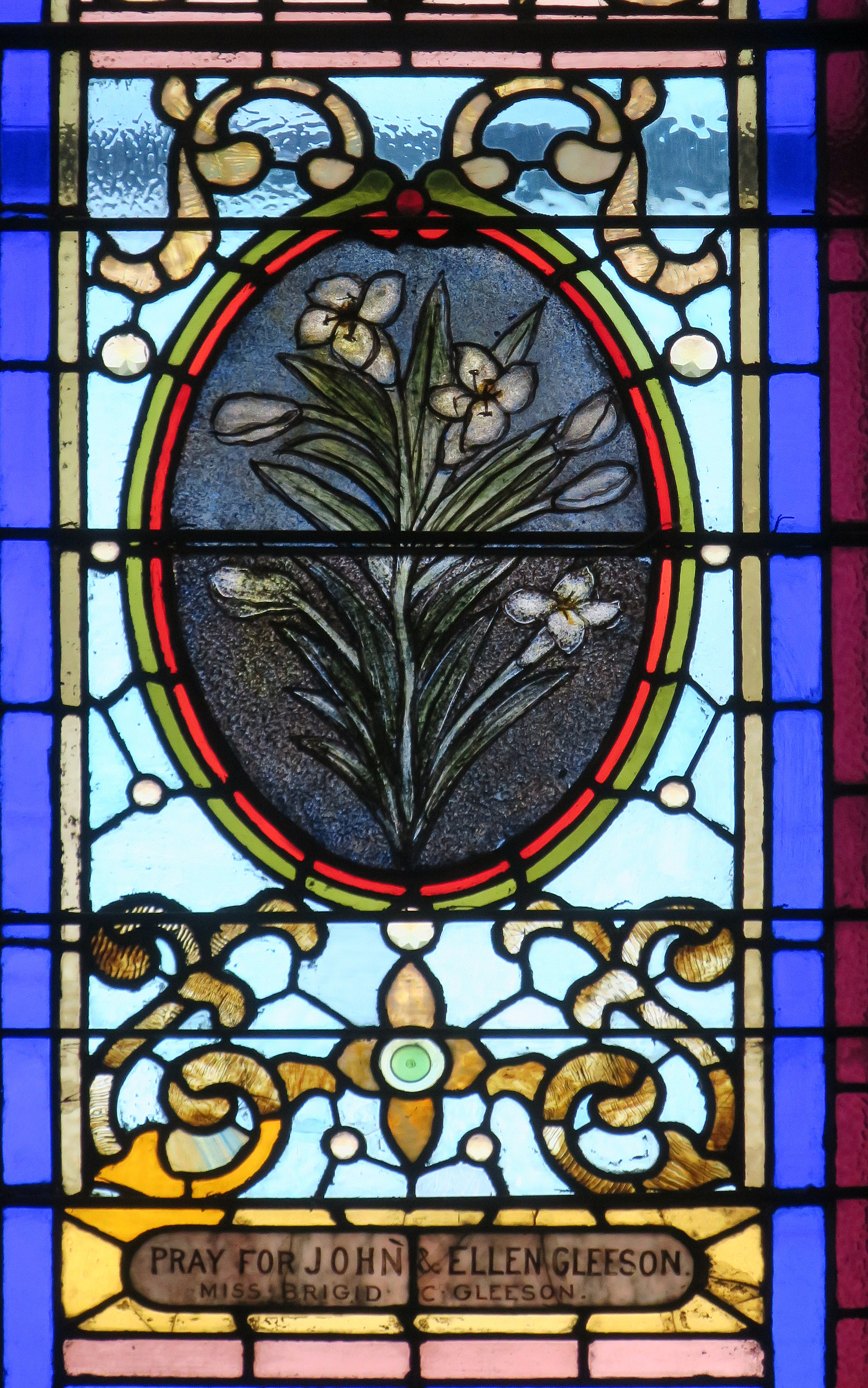
Stained glass window of the Basilica of saints Peter & Paul, May 2023

Saints Peter and Paul Parish in Chattanooga was founded in January 1852. The small but growing Catholic community in Chattanooga attended Mass in various buildings through the parish's early years. In 1858, work began on a stone church, but construction ceased in 1860 due to the Civil War. The nearly completed church was seized by the occupying Union Army during the Battle of Chickamauga in September 1863. The Army of the Cumberland used the stone from the church to construct fortifications and culverts. Though General William Rosecrans (himself a Catholic) had attempted to prevent the site from being disturbed, when he was replaced by General George H. Thomas, demolition of the church resumed. After the war, the congregation filed a claim with the U.S. government for the seizure of the stone. Finally, in 1889, a claim for $18,729 was paid to offset the war-time damage.

Under the leadership of Fr William Walsh, an Irish priest, ground was broken on the current church site on February 1, 1888. The current building was dedicated June 29, 1890. It was added to the National Register of Historic Places in 1979 as Saints Peter and Paul Catholic Church and Buildings.

Stained-glass windows in the basilica, designed by Louis Comfort

Tiffany, depict significant events in the lives of the parish's patron saints. The life of Saint Peter is depicted in the east side windows and the life of Saint Paul in the west side. The basilica's walls are also adorned with 14 polychrome Stations of the Cross, whose scenes depict the suffering, death, and burial of Jesus Christ. The Kilgen organ in the church was built in 1936.

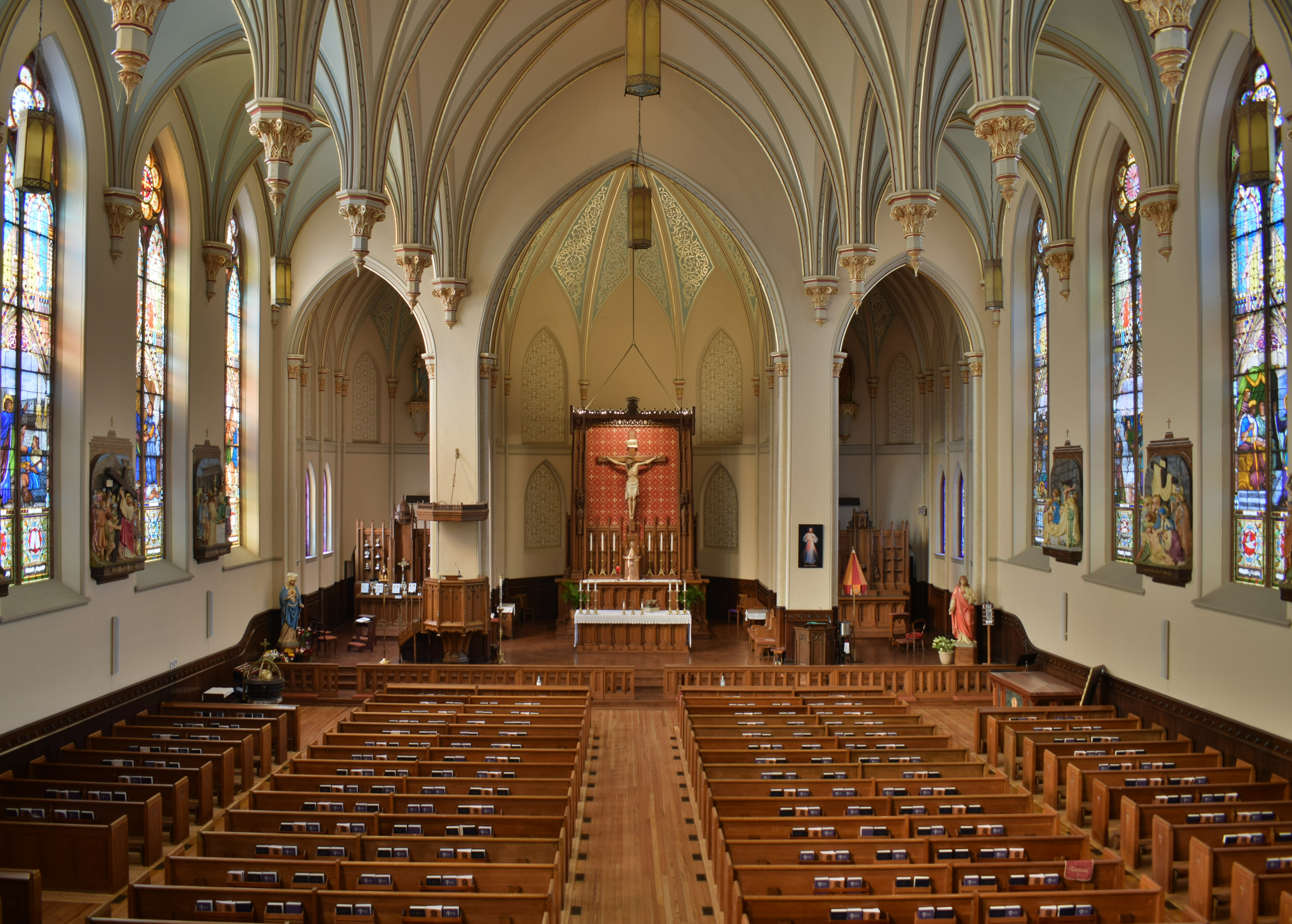
Interior of the Basilica of saints Peter & Paul, May 2023

Saints Peter and Paul was raised to a minor basilica by Pope Benedict XVI and inaugurated by Bishop Richard Stika of the Diocese of Knoxville on October 22, 2011. Monsignor George E. Schmidt, Jr., who had served as pastor since 1986, became the basilica's first rector. He was among more than 30 sons of the parish who entered into the priesthood.

In 2016, the Diocese of Knoxville began a cause of canonization of Fr Patrick Ryan, who served as pastor of Saints Peter and Paul Parish from 1872 to 1878. He died from yellow fever on Sept. 28, 1878 at the age of 33. Ryan is described by an eyewitness as "going from house to house in the worst-infected section of the city to find what he could do for the sick and needy."

== Pastors of Sts. Peter and Paul ==
Date	Pastor of Sts. Peter and Paul
2015–Present	Very Reverend J. David Carter, JCL, JV
1988–2015	Monsignor George Edward Schmidt, Jr.
1911–1946	Monsignor Francis T. Sullivan

== See also ==
- National Register of Historic Places listings in Hamilton County, Tennessee
