= Diocese of Houma–Thibodaux =

Latin Catholic jurisdiction in the United States

Coordinates: 29°35′15″N 90°42′58″W

Diocese of Houma–Thibodaux Dioecesis Humensis–Thibodensis
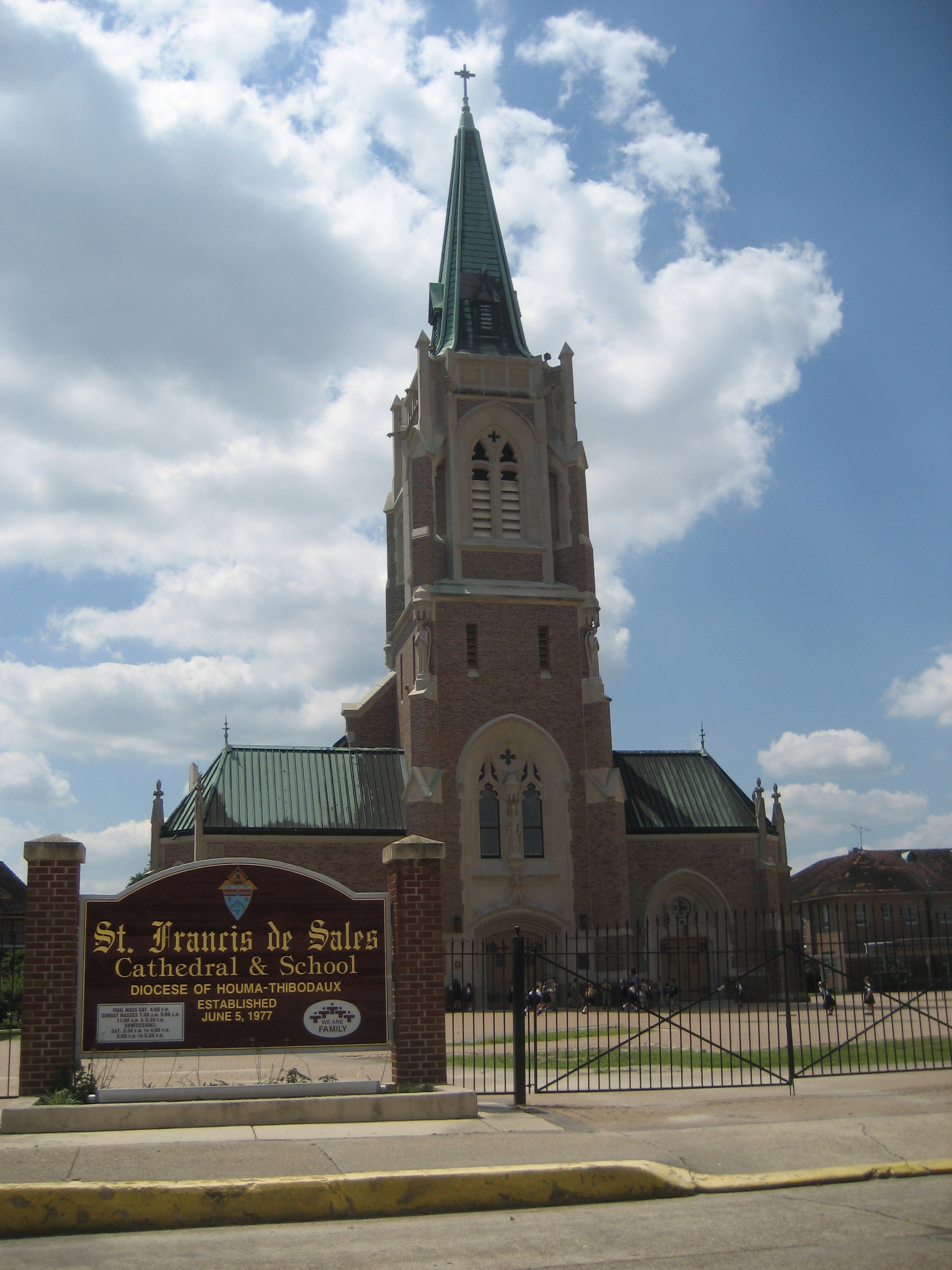
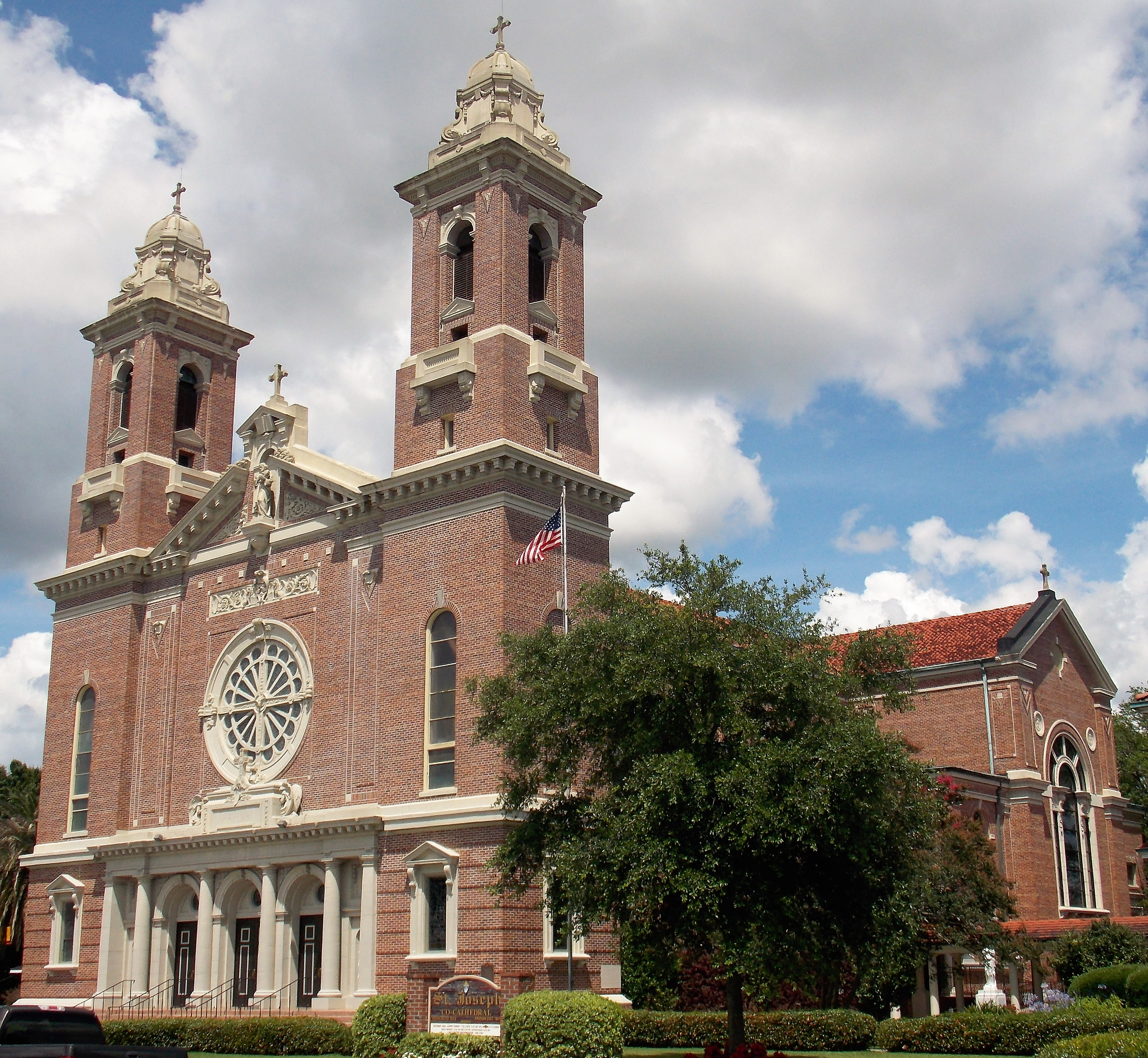
- Cathedral of St. Francis de Sales St. Joseph Co-Cathedral

- Coat of arms

Location
- Country: United States
- Territory: Terrebonne and Lafourche Parishes, the eastern part of St. Mary Parish including Morgan City, and Grand Isle in Jefferson Parish
- Ecclesiastical province: Archdiocese of New Orleans
- Deaneries: Upper Lafource; South Lafourche; Terrebonne
- Headquarters: 2779 Highway 311, Schriever LA, 70395

Statistics
- Population: 120,691 (58.9%)
- Parishes: 39
- Schools: 11

Information
- Denomination: Catholic Church
- Sui iuris church: Latin Church
- Rite: Roman Rite
- Established: June 5, 1977
- Cathedral: Cathedral of St. Francis de Sales (Houma)
- Co-cathedral: St. Joseph Co-Cathedral (Thibodaux)
- Patron saint: St. Francis de Sales
- Secular priests: 59

Current leadership
- Pope: Leo XIV
- Bishop: Simon Peter Engurait
- Metropolitan Archbishop: James F. Checchio
- Vicar General: Andre' Melancon
- Judicial Vicar: Eric Leyble
- Bishops emeritus: Sam Gallip Jacobs

Map
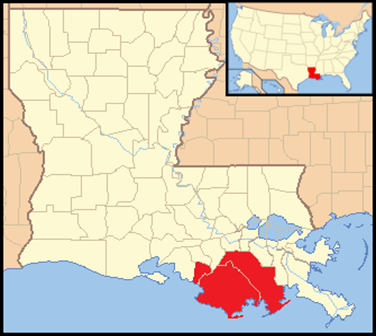

Website
- htdiocese.org

The Diocese of Houma–Thibodaux (Latin: Dioecesis Humensis–Thibodensis) is a diocese of the Catholic Church in southeastern Louisiana. It covers Terrebonne, Lafourche, and the eastern part of St. Mary parishes, Morgan City, and Grand Isle in Jefferson Parish. It has a large Catholic population, with approximately 126,000 Catholics out of a total population of 202,000.

== History ==
=== 1793 to 1977 ===
During the latter part of the 18th century, when Louisiana was a Spanish colony, there were few Catholics in Houma or Thibodaux.and no churches for them. Pope Pius VI in 1793 erected the Diocese of Louisiana and the Two Floridas, encompassing all of Spanish Louisiana.

France in 1800 gained control of Louisiana from Spanin with the signing of the Third Treaty of San Ildefonso. However, three years later, the French Emperor Napoleon Bonaparte sold these colonies to the United States in the Louisiana Purchase. Louisiana was now part of the United States. In 1825, the Vatican renamed the Diocese of Louisiana and the Two Floridas as the Diocese of New Orleans.

St. Joseph was founded as a mission church in Thibodaux in 1817. The congregation erected a small wooden church building two years later. Pope Leo XIII replaced the Diocese of Louisiana and the Two Floridas, with the Diocese of New Orleans in 1825. The Houma and Thibodaux area would remain part of the Diocese of New Orleans, replaced by the Archdiocese of New Orleans, for the next 152 years.

The first parish in Houma, St. Francis de Sales, was established in 1847 and the first church was completed in 1854. The first Catholic school in Thibodaux was opened in 1855 by the Sisters of Mount Carmel. In Houma, the Marianites of Holy Cross founded Our Lady of the Sacred Heart Academy in 1870. Sacred Heart Academy opened in Morgan City in 1893. St. Joseph Hospital in Thibodaux started accepting patients in 1929.

=== 1977 to 2010 ===
Pope Paul VI erected the Diocese of Houma-Thibodaux on June 5, 1977, taking its territory from the Archdiocese of New Orleans. The pope designated the Church of St. Francis de Sales in Houma as the cathedral and St. Joseph Church in Thibodaux as the co-cathedral.

Paul VI named Bishop Warren Boudreaux from the Diocese of Beaumont in Texas as the first bishop of Houma-Thibodaux. Boudreaux became known for banning church fairs in 1985, objecting to the alcohol consumption and overall frivolity at such events. He retired as bishop of Houma-Thibodau in 1992.

The second bishop of Houma-Thibodaux was Charles Jarrell from the Diocese of Lafayette in Louisiana, appointed by Pope John Paul II in 1993. He became bishop of Lafayette in Louisiana in 2002. John Paul II replaced Jarrell in Houma-Thibodaux with Bishop Sam Jacobs from the Diocese of Alexandria in Louisiana.

In the aftermath of Hurricane Katrina in August 2005, the diocese provided numerous temporary shelters for storm victims from New Orleans and admitted to its schools hundreds of children whose schools had been flooded. The diocese provided similar assistance when Hurricane Rita hit the region in September 2005.

=== 2010 to present ===
After Jacobs retired in 2013, Pope Francis named Auxiliary Bishop Shelton Fabre from New Orleans as the fourth bishop of Houma-Thibodaux. In September 2021, the diocese was hit by Hurricane Ida. Of the 39 churches in the diocese, 36 were damaged.Fabre was named archbishop of the Archdiocese of Louisville by Francis in 2022.

To replace Fabre, Francis in 2023 named Auxiliary Bishop Mario E. Dorsonville of the Archdiocese of Washington as the new bishop of Houma-Thibodaux. He died on January 19, 2024.In June 2025, Pope Leo VI appointed Simon Peter Engurait of Houma-Thibodaux as the next bishop of Houma-Thibodaux. He was believed to be the first African-born bishop to lead an American diocese.

=== Sexual abuse ===
Police arrested Robert Melancon, a priest from Sacred Heart Parish in Cut Off, Louisiana, on aggravated rape charges in June 1995. A 17-year-old boy from Houma had accused Melancon of sexually abusing him when he was six or seven years old for several years. The diocese reportedly paid the victim a $30,000 settlement in 1993. Melancon was convicted in June 1996 of aggravated rape and sentenced to life in prison in August 1996.

Patrick Kujawa, pastor of Holy Cross Church in Morgan City, was arrested in January 2000 on charges of processing 62 pornographic images of boys. The diocese notified law enforcement and sent Kujawa to a hospital in Pennsylvania, where he was arrested. He pleaded guilty in December 2000 to possessing child pornography and was sentenced to inpatient therapy and ten years on probation. Kujawa was convicted again on child pornography charges in 2004 and sent to prison.In January 2019, the Diocese of Houma-Thibodaux released the names of 14 clergy who were accused of committing acts of sex abuse.

== Bishops ==
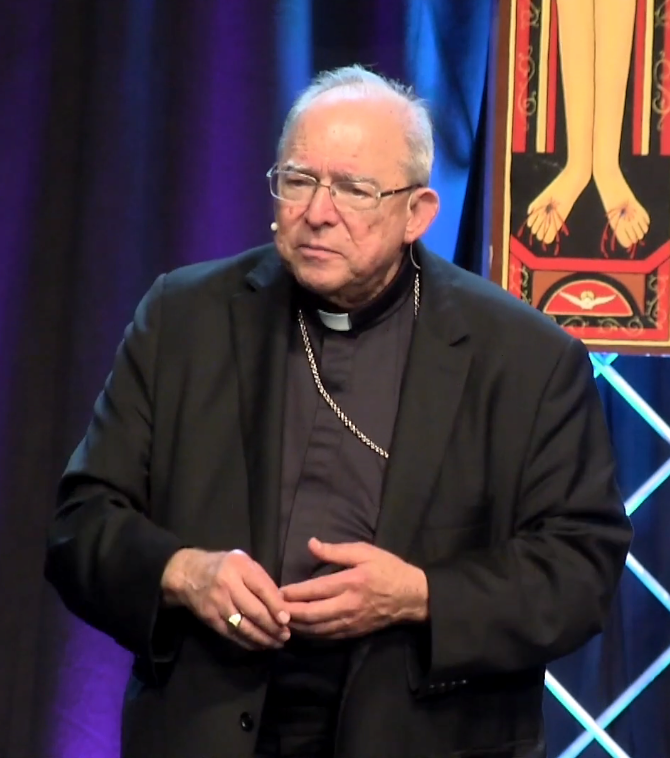
Bishop Jacobs (2019)

=== Bishops of Houma-Thibodaux ===
1. Warren Louis Boudreaux (1977–1992)
2. Charles Michael Jarrell (1992–2002), appointed Bishop of Lafayette in Louisiana
3. Sam Jacobs (2003–2013)
4. Shelton Fabre (2013–2022), Appointed appointed appointed Archbishop of Louisville
5. Mario E. Dorsonville (2023–2024)
6. Simon Peter Engurait (2025–)

=== Other diocesan priests who became bishops ===
- Joseph Nunzio Latino, appointed Bishop of Jackson in 2003
- Oscar Azarcon Solis, appointed auxiliary bishop of Los Angeles in 2003

== Education ==
=== High schools/middle schools ===
- Central Catholic High School – Morgan City
- Edward Douglas White Catholic High School – Thibodaux
- Vandebilt Catholic High School – Houma

Coat of arms of Diocese of Houma–Thibodaux
Notes Arms was designed and adopted when the diocese was erected Adopted 1977 Escutcheon The arms of the diocese contain two sections. The upper section is a red field with a silver cross, a gold enflamed heart and a blue field with three gold fleur-de-lis. The lower section is a blue field with a silver carpenter's square and three silver lilies. Symbolism The upper section of the arms represent Houma. It contains the arms of St. Francis de Sales, patron saint of the diocesan cathedral. The lower section of the arms represent Thibodaux. It shows the symbols of St. Joseph, patron saint of the diocesan co-cathedral. The three lilies also represent the French heritage of south-western Louisiana.
