= James Mark Beckman =

American catholic bishop

His Excellency, The Most Reverend James Mark Beckman
- Bishop of Knoxville
- Diocese: Bishop of Knoxville
- Appointed: May 7, 2024
- Installed: July 26, 2024
- Predecessor: Richard Stika

Orders
- Ordination: July 13, 1990 by James Daniel Niedergeses
- Consecration: July 26, 2024 by Shelton Fabre, J. Mark Spalding, and James Vann Johnston Jr.

Personal details
- Born: October 19, 1962 (age 63) Lawrenceburg, Tennessee
- Motto: Jesus Christ yesterday, today and forever

Styles of James Mark Beckman
- Reference style: His Excellency; The Most Reverend
- Spoken style: Your Excellency
- Religious style: Bishop

James Mark Beckman (born October 19, 1962) is an American prelate of the Roman Catholic Church who has been serving as the fourth bishop for the Diocese of Knoxville in Tennessee since 2024.

== Biography ==
=== Early life ===
James Beckman was born on October 19, 1962, in Lawrenceburg, Tennessee, to Jimmy and Louis Beckman. James was the oldest of six children. While in high school, Beckman decided to become a priest. He entered Saint Ambrose College Seminary in Davenport, Iowa, graduating with a Bachelor of Arts degree in history in 1984. He continued his formation into the priesthood in Belgium at the Catholic University of Louvain in Leuven, where he earned a Master of Religious Studies degree in 1989.

=== Priesthood ===
On July 13, 1990, Beckman was ordained to the priesthood for the Diocese of Nashville by Bishop James Daniel Niedergeses at the Cathedral of the Incarnation in Nashville.After his ordination, the diocese assigned Beckman as an assistant pastor at Holy Rosary Parish and as a teacher at Father Ryan High School, both in Nashville. After one year, Beckman was named as associate principal for pastoral affairs at Father Ryan.

Beckman was appointed as pastor in 1996 of Our Lady of Lourdes parish in Springfield, Tennessee, and administrator of Saint Michael Mission Parish in Cedar Hill, Tennessee. Beckman was also appointed dean of the Northwest Deanery of the diocese in 2001. He left all three assignments in 2002 to serve as pastor at Saint Matthew Parish in Franklin, Tennessee. In 2008, he was also appointed dean of the Central Deanery. His final pastoral assignment was in 2015 at St. Henry Parish in Nashville.

In 2014, Beckman traveled to Spain to hike along the Camino de Santiago, a traditional Catholic pilgrimage route to Santiago de Compostela. Beckman was named director of priest personnel for the diocese in 2018.

=== Bishop of Knoxville ===
Pope Francis appointed Beckman as the fourth bishop of Knoxville on May 7, 2024. On July 26, 2024, Beckman was consecrated as bishop by Archbishop Shelton Joseph Fabre at the Knoxville Convention Center in Knoxville. Beckman said that one of his goals was the healing of bad feelings in the diocese left its previous bishop, Richard Stika, who had been accused of covering up sexual abuse by priests and mismanaging the diocese.

In October 2025, Beckman announced that all parishes are to cease celebrations of the Tridentine Mass in the diocese by 23 November 2025, in accordance with of Pope Francis’s 2021 motu proprio Traditionis custodes.

== See also ==
- Catholic Church hierarchy
- Catholic Church in the United States
- Historical list of the Catholic bishops of the United States
- List of Catholic bishops of the United States
- Lists of patriarchs, archbishops, and bishops

== Episcopal succession ==
Catholic Church titles
Preceded by Richard Stika	Bishop of Knoxville; 2024–present	Succeeded by Incumbent
