= Joseph Edward Kurtz =

American prelate (born 1946)

His Excellency, The Most Reverend Joseph Edward Kurtz
- Archbishop Emeritus of Louisville
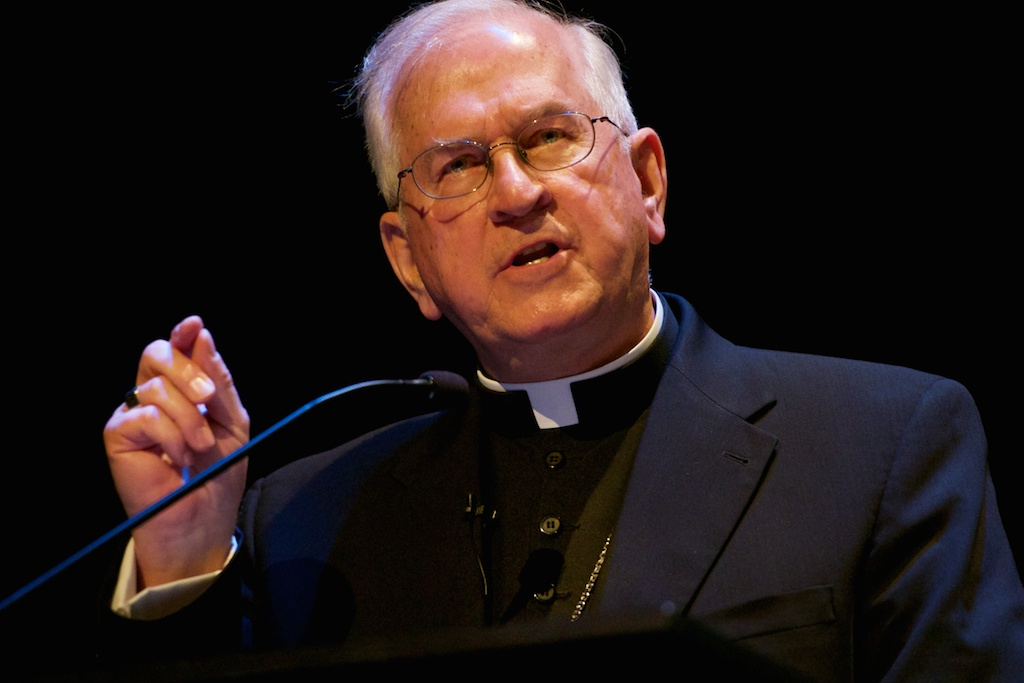
- Archbishop Kurtz in 2016
- Archdiocese: Louisville
- Appointed: June 12, 2007
- Installed: August 15, 2007
- Retired: February 8, 2022
- Predecessor: Thomas C. Kelly, O.P
- Successor: Shelton Fabre
- Previous posts: Bishop of Knoxville (1999–2007); President of the United States Conference of Catholic Bishops (2013–2016)

Orders
- Ordination: March 18, 1972 by Joseph McShea
- Consecration: December 8, 1999 by Gabriel Montalvo Higuera, Thomas C. Kelly, and Edward Peter Cullen

Personal details
- Born: Joseph Edward Kurtz; August 18, 1946 (age 80) Mahanoy City, Pennsylvania, U.S.
- Denomination: Roman Catholic
- Residence: Louisville, Kentucky, U.S.
- Parents: George and Stella (née Zmijewski) Kurtz
- Education: St. Charles Borromeo Seminary; Marywood University
- Motto: Hope In The Lord

Styles of Joseph Edward Kurtz
- Reference style: His Excellency; The Most Reverend
- Spoken style: Your Excellency
- Religious style: Archbishop

Ordination history of Joseph Edward Kurtz
History
Episcopal consecration
- Consecrated by: Gabriel Montalvo Higuera
- Date: December 8, 1999
Episcopal succession
Bishops consecrated by Joseph Edward Kurtz as principal consecrator
- William Medley: February 10, 2010
- Charles C. Thompson: June 29, 2011
- John Stowe: May 5, 2015
- J. Mark Spalding: February 2 (Candlemas), 2018

Joseph Edward Kurtz (born August 18, 1946) is an American prelate of the Roman Catholic Church who served as the archbishop of the Archdiocese of Louisville in Kentucky from 2007 to 2022. He previously served as the bishop of the Diocese of Knoxville in Tennessee from 1999 to 2007. Kurtz was president of the United States Conference of Catholic Bishops (USCCB) from 2013 to 2016.

== Biography ==
=== Early life ===
Joseph Kurtz was born on August 18, 1946, in Mahanoy City, Pennsylvania, to George and Stella (née Zmijewski) Kurtz. He is of Polish descent. One of five children (Rose Marie, Theresa, George, and Patricia), he entered St. Charles Borromeo Seminary in Philadelphia in 1964. He obtained a Bachelor of Arts degree in philosophy and a Master of Divinity degree from that school.

=== Priesthood ===
Kurtz was ordained to the priesthood for the Diocese of Allentown by Bishop Joseph McShea on March 18, 1972. Kurtz completed his post-graduate work at Marywood University in Scranton, Pennsylvania, earning a Master of Social Work degree.

During his priestly ministry, Kurtz served as high school teacher, college lecturer, administrator, and pastor in Catasauqua and Bethlehem, both in Pennsylvania. The Vatican elevated Kurtz to the rank of Monsignor in 1986.

=== Bishop of Knoxville ===
On October 26, 1999, Kurtz was appointed as the second bishop of Knoxville by Pope John Paul II. He received his episcopal consecration on December 8. 1999. from Archbishop Gabriel Higuera, with Archbishop Thomas Kelly and Bishop Edward Cullen serving as co-consecrators, before an audience of approximately 5,000 at the Knoxville Convention Center in Knoxville, Tennessee.

=== Archbishop of Louisville ===
Kurtz was named archbishop of Louisville on June 12, 2007, by Pope Benedict XVI. His installation took place on August 15, 2007, at Louisville Gardens in Louisville, Kentucky.

In addition to his diocesan duties, Kurtz served as chair of the USCCB Committee on Marriage and Family Life. He was elected as the vice president of the USCCB in November 2010. In November 2013, Kurtz was elected USCCB president. In February 2014, the Vatican named Kurtz as a member of the Congregation for the Oriental Churches. In November 2014, he was elected as a delegate to the 2015 Synod of Bishops on the Family, pending Vatican approval.

In February 2019, Kurtz released a report that named 22 priests from the archdiocese with credible accusations of sexual abuse. The report was prepared by an independent investigator who was not part of the church. None of the 22 men were active priests in 2019.

In July 2019, Kurtz underwent treatment for urothelial cancer, which required a three-month medical leave of absence from the archdiocese.

=== Retirement ===
On February 8, 2022, Pope Francis accepted Kurtz's letter of resignation as archbishop of Louisville and named Shelton Joseph Fabre as archbishop of the Archdiocese. He was installed on March 30, 2022.

== Doctrinal positions ==
Kurtz is generally seen as a conservative and a firm follower of Vatican directives on doctrine and liturgy. The Rev. Thomas J. Reese indicates that Kurtz is a "smiling conservative" like Cardinal Timothy M. Dolan, who is "very gracious but still holds the same positions" as a cleric like Archbishop Charles J. Chaput, who has openly criticized Catholic politicians who support abortion rights for women.

Coat of arms of Joseph Edward Kurtz
Notes The coat of arms was designed and adopted when Kurtz was installed as the Archbishop of Louisville Adopted 2007 Escutcheon The arms of his jurisdiction, the Archdiocese of Louisville, is seen in the dexter impalement (left side) of the design. On the right side of the shield is a gold cross, surrounded at the center by a white ring. A white lily on the top left of the cross and an anchor at the bottom left are also found. Motto Hope in the Lord Symbolism The gold cross on the right side of the shield symbolizes faith. The center white ring is a symbol of Kurtz's native Diocese of Allentown and of its patron saint, Saint Catherine of Siena. The white lily is a symbol of Saint Joseph, the archbishop's patron saint. The anchor is a traditional symbol of hope and fits with Kurtz's motto, "Hope in the Lord."

Catholic Church titles
Preceded by Anthony O'Connell	Bishop of Knoxville; 1999–2007	Succeeded by Richard Stika
Preceded by Timothy M. Dolan	President of the USCCB; November 12, 2013 – November 16, 2016	Succeeded by Daniel DiNardo
Preceded by Thomas C. Kelly	Archbishop of Louisville; 2007 – 2022	Succeeded by Shelton Fabre
