= Richard Stika =

American Roman Catholic prelate (1957–2026)

His Excellency, The Most Reverend Richard Stika
- Bishop of Knoxville
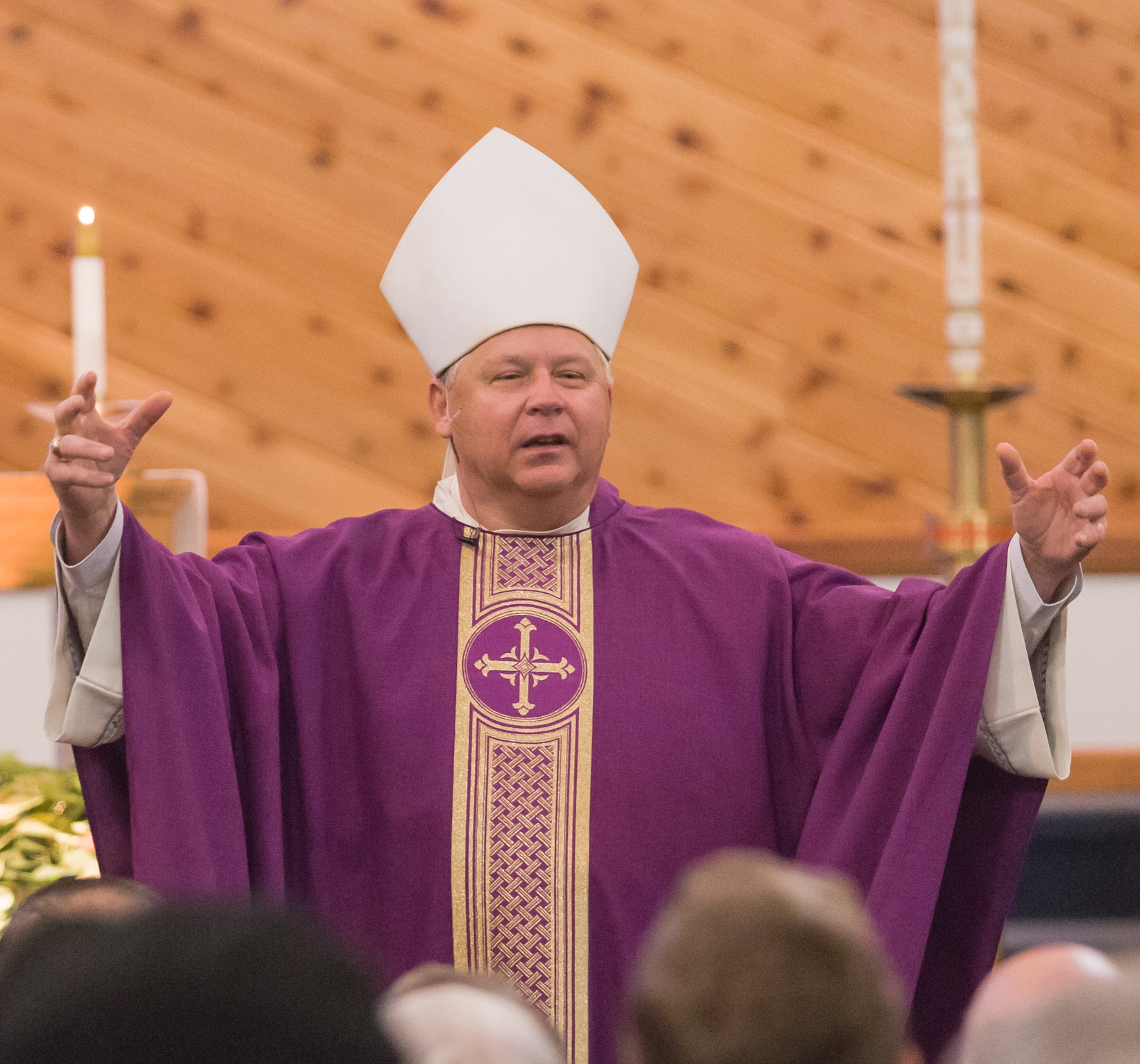
- Stika in 2016
- Church: Catholic Church
- Archdiocese: Louisville
- Diocese: Knoxville
- Appointed: January 12, 2009
- Installed: March 19, 2009
- Retired: June 27, 2023
- Predecessor: Joseph Edward Kurtz
- Successor: James Mark Beckman

Orders
- Ordination: December 14, 1985 by John L. May
- Consecration: March 19, 2009 by Justin Francis Rigali; Joseph Edward Kurtz; Robert Joseph Shaheen

Personal details
- Born: July 4, 1957 St. Louis, Missouri, U.S.
- Died: February 17, 2026 (aged 68) St. Louis, Missouri
- Education: St. Louis University; Kenrick-Glennon Seminary
- Motto: Iesu confido in te (Jesus, I trust in you)

Styles of Richard Frank Stika
- Reference style: His Excellency; The Most Reverend
- Spoken style: Your Excellency
- Religious style: Bishop

Richard Frank Stika (July 4, 1957 – February 17, 2026) was an American Catholic prelate who served as Bishop of Knoxville from 2009 to 2023, when he resigned at the request of Pope Francis. Stika had been accused of covering up the rape of a diocesan employee by a former seminarian, among other allegations of misconduct and mismanagement.

== Biography ==
=== Early life ===
Richard Stika was born on July 4, 1957, in St. Louis, Missouri, to Frank and Helen (née Musielak) Stika; his father was of Czech heritage and his mother Polish. The third of four children, Richard Stika had two brothers, Lawrence and Robert, and Joseph was later adopted. He was baptized at St. Francis de Sales Church on July 21, 1957, and attended Epiphany of Our Lord School in South St. Louis.

Stika attended St. Augustine Minor Seminary High School (Note: The school operated from 1949 to 1977.) in Holland, Michigan, for one year. During a 2023 interview, Stika said that he was sexually abused by an Augustinian priest while at that school. He transferred to Bishop DuBourg High School in St. Louis, graduating in 1975. Stika then studied at St. Louis University, obtaining a Bachelor of Science degree in business in 1979. Stika then entered Kenrick-Glennon Seminary in Shrewsbury, Missouri, where he earned a Bachelor of Arts degree in philosophy in 1981 and a Master of Divinity degree in 1985. Cardinal John Carberry ordained Stika as a deacon on May 1, 1985.

=== Priesthood ===
Stika was ordained to the priesthood at the Cathedral of St. Louis in St. Louis by Archbishop John L. May on December 14, 1985, for the Archdiocese of St. Louis. After his ordination, Stika served as an associate pastor of Mary Queen of Peace Parish in Webster Groves, Missouri, until 1991. In 1991, He was appointed spiritual director of the Catholic Youth Organization chapter in the archdiocese and associate director of the Office of Vocations. Stika was named in 1991 as an associate pastor at St. Paul Parish in Fenton, Missouri. The next year, he was assigned to Cathedral of St. Louis Parish as an associate pastor, holding that position until 1994.

From 1994 to 2004, Stika served as chancellor of the archdiocese. During this period, he also served as private secretary and master of ceremonies to Archbishop Justin Rigali (from 1994 to 1997), vicar general and vicar for religious (from 1997 to 2004), and as a member of the College of Consultors (from 1997 to 2009). Stika coordinated Pope John Paul II's visit to St. Louis in 1999.

Named vicar for priests in 2002, Stika served as both pastor of Annunziata Parish in Ladue, Missouri, and episcopal vicar for Child and Youth Protection from 2004 to 2009.

=== Bishop of Knoxville ===
On January 12, 2009, Stika was appointed bishop of Knoxville by Pope Benedict XVI. He was ordained on March 19, 2009, by Rigali, with Archbishop Joseph Kurtz and Bishop Robert Shaheen serving as co-consecrators, at the Knoxville Convention Center in Knoxville. Stika selected as his episcopal motto: Iesu Confido In Te ("Jesus, I Trust in You").

Possessing bi-ritual faculties, Stika was able to celebrate the West Syriac Rite Holy Qurbono according to the recension of the Maronite Church, an Eastern Catholic Church in full communion with the pope. He was a member of the Knights of Columbus and the Order of the Holy Sepulchre. He was a fan of the St. Louis Cardinals baseball team. He was a close friend of Cardinal Rigali and considered the latter's protégé.

==== Cathedral of the Most Sacred Heart ====
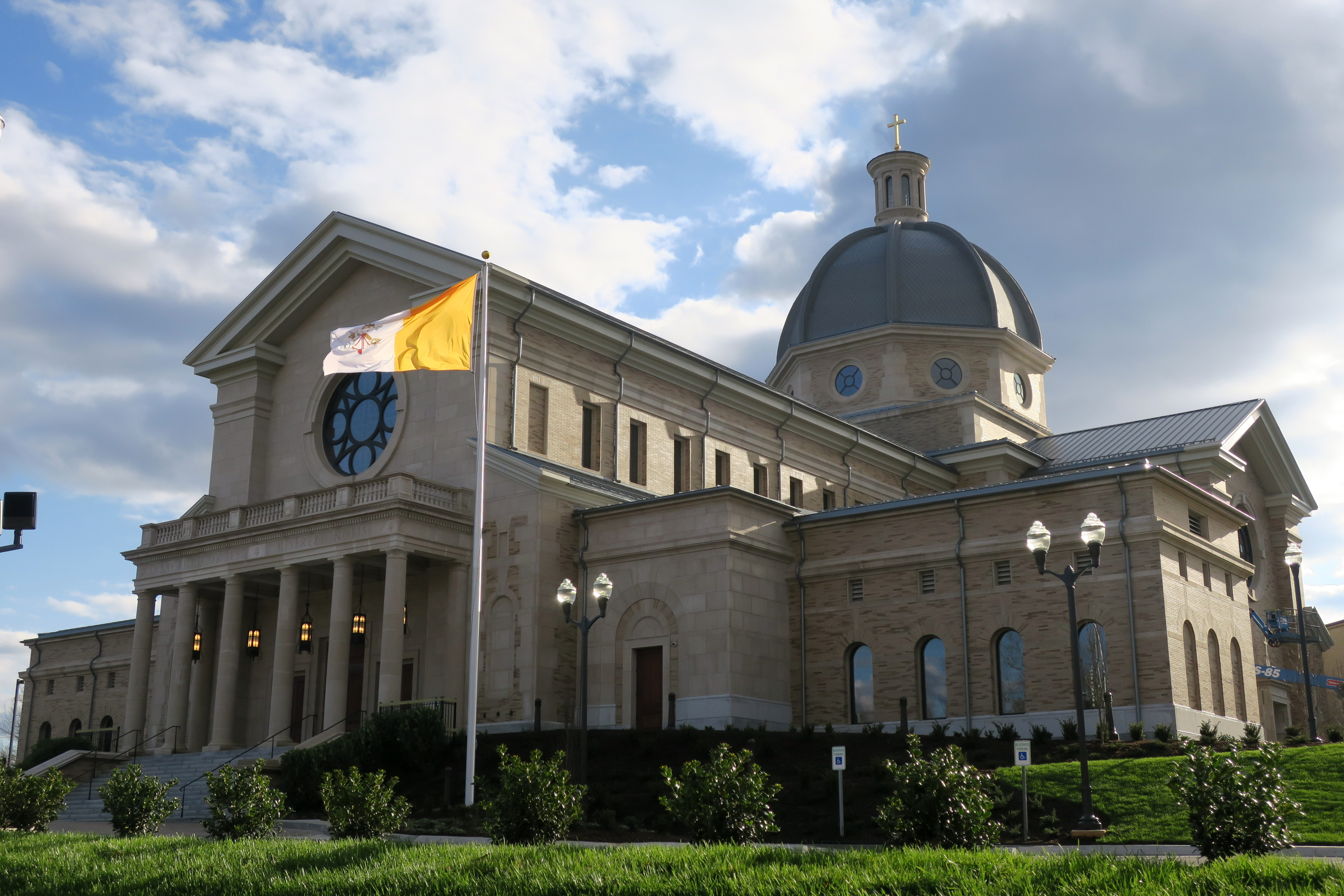
The Cathedral of the Sacred Heart in Knoxville, which Stika oversaw the construction of from 2014 to 2018.

In September 2014, Stika initiated fundraising to construct a new Cathedral of the Most Sacred Heart of Jesus in Knoxville. He dedicated it on March 3, 2018.

Questions concerning the funding of the cathedral arose in 2021. Some diocesan priests and employees alleged that Stika took funds from diocesan education and employee benefit funds, including loan money from the US Paycheck Protection Program, to pay the $36 million cost for the cathedral. One anonymous priest said, "we are nearly bankrupt... there's just not going to be cash there."

==== Criticisms of leadership as bishop ====
In April 2021, an official of the Congregation for Bishops in Rome stated that the Vatican had received about ten accusations against Stika under the auspices of the motu proprio Vos estis lux mundi, which covered procedures for allegations of sexual abuse by clergy. The official said that the Vatican would probably task Archbishop Kurtz with investigating the allegations.

In 2021, 11 diocesan priests wrote to the apostolic nuncio, Archbishop Christophe Pierre. They requested that the Vatican provide the diocese with "merciful relief" from Stika's leadership. The priests wrote that:

Our experience of our appointed bishop varies among us, but the undersigned do share a common awareness that the past twelve years of service under Bishop Stika have been, on the whole, detrimental to priestly fraternity and even to our personal well-being.

==== Resignation and death ====
On May 13, 2023, The Pillar reported that Vatican officials planned to request Stika's resignation as bishop of Knoxville. This followed an investigation of administrative mismanagement and cover-up of sexual misconduct allegations against a former seminarian.

Pope Francis accepted Stika's resignation as bishop of Knoxville on June 27, 2023. Despite criticism of his leadership and recent sexual lawsuits, Stika stated that his resignation was purely health-related. It was also noted that he suffered from diabetes for decades and had experienced a heart attack, heart bypass surgery and a diabetic coma that resulted in vision loss in one eye.

On February 17, 2026, Stika died at age 68 in St. Louis. His death was first announced by The Pillar, and later confirmed by the Diocese of Knoxville shortly thereafter on FaceBook.

== Handling of clerical sexual abuse ==
On April 16, 2010, Stika revoked the ministerial privileges of Reverend William Casey. He had been accused of rape and sexual abuse by a young altar boy. When confronted by Stika and other diocesan officials, Casey admitted his guilt. Casey was convicted in July 2011 of first-degree sexual misconduct and two counts of aggravated rape and sentenced to prison. The Vatican laicized Casey on January 10, 2013.

In 2017, Stika planned to ordain as a priest a transitional deacon of another diocese who had been dismissed from formation because of sexual misconduct allegations. This was over the objections of Knoxville priests and psychological experts. The deacon's own bishop refused to excardinate, or transfer, him to the Diocese of Knoxville, and the seminarian was not ordained.

Stika was accused of "bullying" a woman who reported possible grooming and sexual abuse by a priest of his diocese in 2017.

Reverend Anthony D. Punnackal, a visiting priest from India, was accused in April 2022 of "one count of sexual battery and one count of sexual battery by an authority figure" during a grief counseling session. The diocese is alleged to have mishandled that claim as well.

=== Wojciech Sobczuk ===
In 2018, Stika invited Wojciech Sobczuk, a Polish seminarian, to study in the diocese on the recommendation of Cardinal Stanisław Dziwisz. In February 2019, an organist at Sacred Heart Cathedral complained to Stika that Sobczuk had raped and sexually harassed him. In response to these complaints, Stika allegedly accused the organist of raping Sobczuk. Shortly after the alleged rape in Knoxville, Stika sent Sobczuk to study for the priesthood at St. Meinrad Seminary in Indiana. Stika also recommended the two men keep in contact using Snapchat, a social media app in which messages disappear after being sent.

While attending St. Meinrad, Sobczuk received special treatment from Stika and lived in the bishop's home when not at the seminary. In December 2019, Stika arranged for Sobczuk to miss more than a week of classes to accompany Stika on his ad limina visit to the Vatican. Between mid-2018 and 2020, Stika earmarked $4,000 of diocesan funds as cash gifts for Sobczuk. The diocese also paid his phone bill and reimbursed him nearly $30,000 in expenses for travel, car repairs, and other personal expenditures. Sobczuk also received monthly stipends that ranged from $600 to $1,000, three to five times higher than the typical seminarian's stipend.

In February 2021, the organist sued the diocese. His lawsuit also mentioned that the Jesuit Order had previously expelled Sobczuk due to allegations of sexual misconduct at SS. Cyril and Methodius Seminary in Orchard Lake, Michigan. St. Meinrad dismissed Sobczuk in March 2021 after receiving allegations of sexual misconduct from their own seminarians. These included groping and tickling other seminarians, sending them explicit Snapchat messages, and watching one seminarian undress through a window.

In response to the rape allegation against Sobczuk, the diocesan review board appointed a retired law enforcement officer to conduct an investigation. Stika then dismissed the investigator for "asking all these questions". Stika appointed a replacement investigator who only interviewed Sobczuk before closing his investigation. The second investigator never interviewed any of the seminarians at St. Meinrad who had accused Sobczuk of harassment and assault.

After Sobczuk returned to Knoxville, Stika continued to classify him as a seminarian to protect his immigration status. Sobczuk moved into the episcopal residence and in September 2021 accompanied Stika on a 10-day vacation in the United States.

== See also ==
- Catholic Church hierarchy
- Catholic Church in the United States
- Historical list of the Catholic bishops of the United States
- List of Catholic bishops of the United States
- Lists of patriarchs, archbishops, and bishops

== Notes ==
Catholic Church titles
Preceded by Joseph Kurtz	Bishop of Knoxville; 2009–2023	Succeeded by James Mark Beckman
