= Mario E. Dorsonville =

Colombian-born American Catholic prelate (1960–2024)

His Excellency, The Most Reverend Mario Eduardo Dorsonville
- Bishop of Houma–Thibodaux
- Church: Catholic Church; Latin Church
- Province: New Orleans
- See: Houma–Thibodaux
- Appointed: February 1, 2023
- Installed: March 29, 2023
- Term ended: January 19, 2024
- Predecessor: Shelton Fabre
- Successor: Simon Peter Engurait
- Previous posts: Auxiliary Bishop of Washington (2015‍–‍2023); Titular Bishop of Kearney (2015‍–‍2023)

Orders
- Ordination: November 23, 1985 by Mario Revollo Bravo
- Consecration: April 20, 2015 by Donald Wuerl, Óscar Andrés Rodríguez Maradiaga, William E. Lori

Personal details
- Born: October 31, 1960 Bogotá, Colombia
- Died: January 19, 2024 (aged 63) Kenner, Louisiana, US
- Education: B.A., Theological Seminary of Bogotá; STL, Pontifical Xavierian University; D.Min., Catholic University of America
- Motto: Sacerdos in aeternum (Latin for 'A priest forever')

Styles of Mario Eduardo Dorsonville-Rodríguez
- Reference style: His Excellency; The Most Reverend
- Spoken style: Your Excellency
- Religious style: Bishop

Mario Eduardo Dorsonville-Rodríguez (October 31, 1960 – January 19, 2024) was a Colombian-born American Catholic prelate who served as the bishop of Houma–Thibodaux in Louisiana from March 2023 until his death in January 2024. He was an auxiliary bishop in the Archdiocese of Washington in the District of Columbia and parts of Maryland from 2015 to 2023.

== Biography ==
=== Early life ===
Mario Eduardo Dorsonville-Rodríguez was born on October 31, 1960, in Bogotá, Colombia, to Carlos Dorsonville and Leonor Rodríguez. He studied for the priesthood at the Theological Seminary of Bogotá where he received a Bachelor of Arts degree in philosophy in 1981 and a Bachelor of Sacred Theology degree in 1985.

=== Priesthood ===
On November 23, 1985, Dorsonville was ordained a priest at the Primatial Cathedral of Bogotá by Cardinal Mario Bravo for the Archdiocese of Bogotá. After his ordination, Dorsonville served as associate pastor at Immaculate Heart of Mary Parish in Bogotá until 1986, then as chaplain of the National University of Colombia until 1987. That same year, he was appointed pastor of San Jose de Calasanz Parish in Bogotá. Dorsonville was also associate chaplain and professor of ethics at National University. He completed a Licentiate in Sacred Theology at the Pontifical Xavierian University in Bogotá in 1991.

In 1992, Dorsonville moved to Washington, D.C., to study at the Catholic University of America. While studying there, he served as associate pastor at Good Shepherd Parish in Alexandria, Virginia, and Christ the Redeemer Parish in Sterling, Virginia. He also lectured at the Inter-American Development Bank in Washington and at the Hispanic Apostolate of Arlington.

Dorsonville returned to Colombia in 1995 and served for a year as chaplain and professor of business ethics at National University and professor of pastoral counseling and catechesis at the Major Seminary.

In 1996, Dorsonville moved back to Washington to complete his Doctor of Ministry degree at the Catholic University. He was assigned in 1997 as associate pastor of Our Lady of Lourdes Parish in Bethesda, Maryland. Deciding to live permanently in the United States, Dorsonville was incardinated, or transferred, in 1999 from the Archdiocese of Bogotá to the Archdiocese of Washington.

In 2004, Dorsonville became assistant pastor of St. Mark the Evangelist Parish in Hyattsville, Maryland. In 2005, he was appointed vice president for mission of the Catholic Charities of Washington and director of the Spanish Catholic Center. He completed an executive certificate in non-profit management at Georgetown University in Washington in 2009. In 2011 he took on the additional responsibilities of adjunct spiritual director of St. John Paul II Seminary in Washington. He also served on the board of directors for Carroll Publishing Company (2000–2003), was a member of the priest council for the archdiocese (2000–2015), and served as mentor for newly ordained priests (2010–2011) and held a membership in the college of consultors (2011–2015).

=== Auxiliary Bishop of Washington ===
On March 20, 2015, Pope Francis named Dorsonville titular bishop of Kearney and an auxiliary bishop of Washington. He received his episcopal consecration on April 20, 2015, at the Cathedral of St. Matthew in Washington, D.C., from Cardinal Donald Wuerl, with Cardinal Óscar Rodríguez Maradiaga and Archbishop William Lori as co-consecrators.

On February 29, 2020, Dorsonville addressed a hearing on refugees by the Subcommittee on Immigration and Citizenship at the US House of Representatives. He said:

Today I am here to echo the Holy Father’s message: to recognize that we must at all times, but particularly at this moment of great global turmoil, recognize the most vulnerable and welcome them to the extent we are able.

Dorsonville released a statement on August 20, 2021, calling on the Biden Administration to address the refugee influx created by the Taliban takeover of Afghanistan that month. On September 29, 2021, during a homily, Dorsonville asked parishioners to become actively involved in helping Afghan refugees.

=== Bishop of Houma–Thibodaux ===
On February 1, 2023, Pope Francis appointed Dorsonville as bishop of Houma–Thibodaux. He was installed on March 29, 2023. Dorsonville died at the Ochsner Medical Center in Kenner, Louisiana, on January 19, 2024, due to complications from liver disease at age 63.

Catholic Church titles
Preceded by Shelton Fabre	Bishop of Houma–Thibodaux; 2023–2024	Succeeded by Simon Peter Engurait
Preceded by Robert Deeley	Titular Bishop of Kearney; 2015–2023	Succeeded by Brian Nunes
Preceded by —	Auxiliary Bishop of Washington; 2015–2023	Succeeded by —
