= Sam Jacobs (bishop) =

American bishop

His Excellency, The Most Reverend Sam Galip Jacobs
- Bishop Emeritus of Houma–Thibodaux
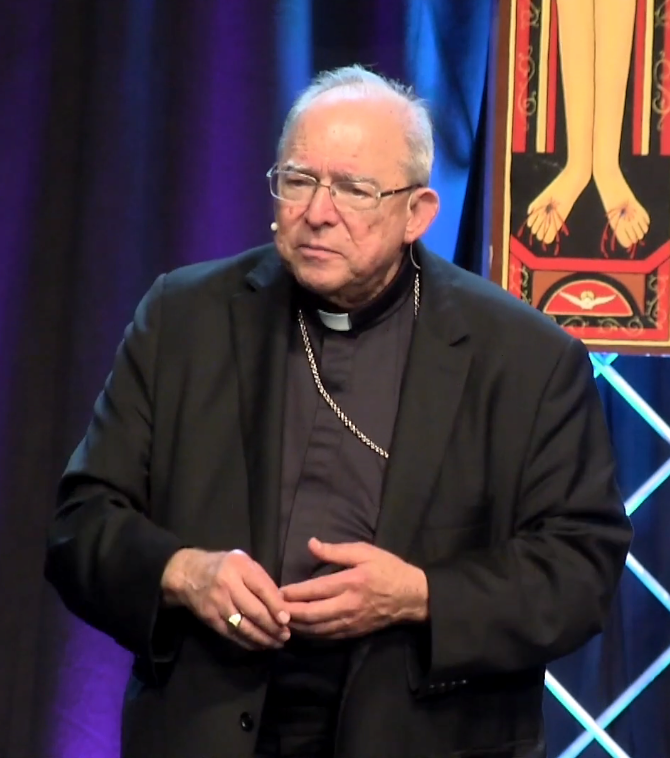
- Bishop Jacobs at the 2019 Steubenville; Power and Purpose Conference
- Diocese: Houma–Thibodaux
- Appointed: August 1, 2003
- Installed: October 10, 2003
- Retired: September 23, 2013
- Predecessor: Charles Michael Jarrell
- Successor: Shelton Fabre
- Previous post: Bishop of Alexandria (1989-2003)

Orders
- Ordination: June 6, 1964 by Warren L. Boudreaux
- Consecration: August 24, 1989 by Francis B. Schulte, Warren Louis Boudreaux, and Jude Speyrer

Personal details
- Born: March 4, 1938 (age 88) Greenwood, Mississippi, US
- Motto: Jesus is Lord

Styles of Sam Galip Jacobs
- Reference style: His Excellency; The Most Reverend
- Spoken style: Your Excellency
- Religious style: Bishop

Sam Galip Jacobs (born March 4, 1938) is an American Catholic retired prelate who served as bishop of Houma-Thibodaux in Louisiana from 2003 to 2013. He previously served as bishop of Alexandria in Louisiana from 1989 to 2003.

== Biography ==
=== Early years ===
Sam Jacobs was born on March 4, 1938, in Greenwood, Mississippi, but raised in Lake Charles, Louisiana. In 1951, he entered Immaculata Seminary in Lafayette, Louisiana, graduating in 1957. Jacobs then entered the Catholic University of America in Washington, D.C., as a Basselin scholar, graduating with a degree in theology in 1964.

After graduation from college, Jacobs served as chairman of the National Service Committee for the Charismatic Renewal and diocesan director of vocations and seminarians for the Diocese of Lake Charles.

=== Priesthood ===
On June 6, 1964, Jacobs was ordained to the priesthood for the Diocese of Lafayette by Bishop Warren L. Boudreaux. Jacobs served as pastor, chaplain, and associate pastor of several parishes in the Diocese of Lafayette and the Diocese of Lake Charles.

=== Bishop of Alexandria in Louisiana ===
On July 1, 1989, Pope John Paul II appointed Jacobs as the tenth bishop of Alexandria in Louisiana. He received his episcopal consecration on August 24, 1989, at the Rapides Parish Coliseum in Alexandria, Louisiana, from Archbishop Francis Schulte, with Bishops Boudreaux and Jude Speyrer serving as co-consecrators.

After becoming bishop, Jacobs held town meeting in every parish in the diocese to meet parishioners and hear their concerns. Under Jacobs, the diocese inaugurated the Steubenville South Youth Conference and constructed a new youth center at the Maryhill Renewal Center in Alexandria, to accommodate youth retreats.

A 2002 article by the Dallas Morning News revealed that in 1998 Jacobs received an allegation of fondling against Reverend John Andries from Natchitoches Parish. Jacobs suspended Andries from ministry and removed him from his parish. However, after Andries received counseling and testing, Jacobs returned him to the same parish. Jacobs did not notify authorities about the accusation. In 2002, Andries was charged with touching and masturbating onto a sleeping boy at the family's house in Abbeville, Louisiana. The boy's family sued Jacobs and the diocese

=== Bishop of Houma-Thibodaux ===
On August 1, 2003, John Paul II appointed Jacobs as the third bishop of Houma-Thibodaux. He was installed on October 10, 2003.

Within the United States Conference of Catholic Bishops, he served chairman of the Committee for Evangelization (2005–2007), and was a member of the Committee on Laity, Marriage, Family Life, and Youth and the Committee on Evangelization and Catechesis.

=== Retirement ===
On September 23, 2013, Pope Francis accepted Jacobs's letter of resignation and appointed Auxiliary Bishop Shelton Fabre as the new bishop of the Diocese of Houma-Thibodaux.

== See also ==
- Catholic Church hierarchy
- Catholic Church in the United States
- Historical list of the Catholic bishops of the United States
- List of Catholic bishops of the United States
- Lists of patriarchs, archbishops, and bishops

== Episcopal succession ==
Catholic Church titles
Preceded by Charles Michael Jarrell	Bishop of Houma-Thibodaux; 2003–2013	Succeeded by Shelton Fabre
Preceded by John Clement Favalora	Bishop of Alexandria; 1989–2003	Succeeded by Ronald Paul Herzog
