= Shelton Fabre =

American Catholic prelate (born 1963)

His Excellency, The Most Reverend Shelton Fabre
- Archbishop of Louisville
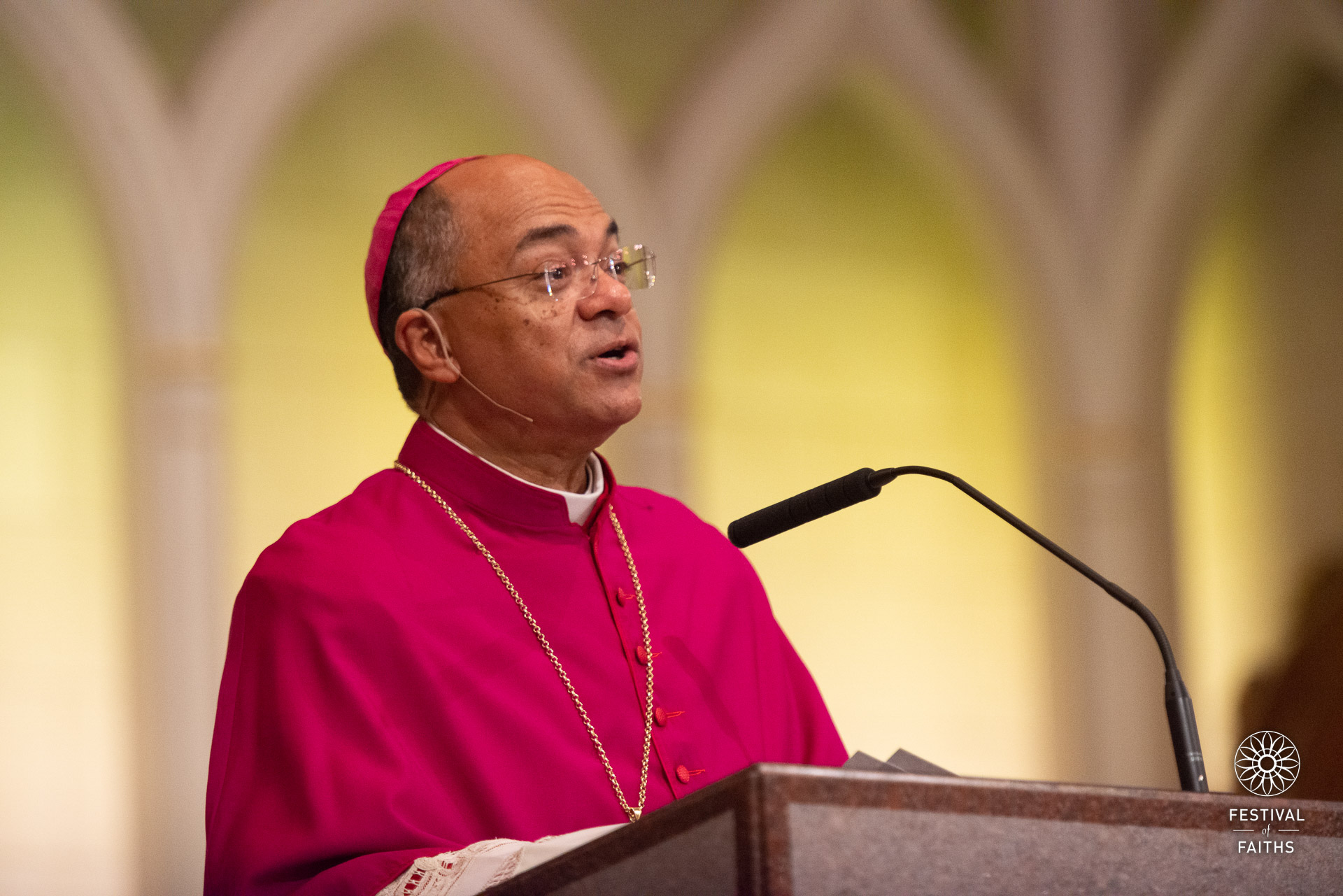
- Fabre in 2022
- Archdiocese: Louisville
- Appointed: February 8, 2022
- Installed: March 30, 2022
- Predecessor: Joseph Edward Kurtz
- Previous posts: Auxiliary Bishop of New Orleans and Titular Bishop of Pudentiana (2007-2013); Bishop of Houma–Thibodaux (2013-2022)

Orders
- Ordination: August 5, 1989 by Stanley Joseph Ott
- Consecration: February 28, 2007 by Alfred Clifton Hughes, John Ricard, Robert William Muench

Personal details
- Born: October 25, 1963 (age 62) New Roads, Louisiana, US
- Education: Saint Joseph Seminary College; American College of Louvain; Katholieke Universiteit Leuven
- Motto: Consolamini popule Meus (Latin for 'Comfort My people')

Styles of Shelton Fabre
- Reference style: His Excellency; The Most Reverend
- Spoken style: Your Excellency
- Religious style: Archbishop

Shelton Joseph Fabre (born October 25, 1963) is an American Catholic prelate who serves as archbishop of Louisville in Kentucky. He previously served as bishop of Houma-Thibodaux in Louisiana from 2013 to 2022 and as an auxiliary bishop of the Archdiocese of New Orleans in Louisiana from 2007 to 2013.

== Early life and education ==
Fabre was born in New Roads, Louisiana on October 25, 1963. He attended primary and secondary schools in New Roads, graduating in 1981 as valedictorian of Catholic High School of Pointe Coupée. He then entered Saint Joseph Seminary College in St. Benedict, Louisiana, graduating with a bachelor's degree in history in 1985.

Fabre then continued his formation at the American College of Louvain in Belgium, also studying at the Katholieke Universiteit Leuven. He earned a Bachelor of Arts in religious studies in 1987 and a Master of Arts in religious studies degree in 1989. Fabre was ordained a deacon on December 10, 1988, by Archbishop Peter Gerety at the Louvain University church.

== Priesthood ==
Fabre was ordained a priest on August 5, 1989, by Bishop Stanley Ott for the Diocese of Baton Rouge at St. Joseph Cathedral in Baton Rouge.

After his 1989 ordination, the diocese assigned Fabre as assistant pastor of the following parishes:

- St. Alphonsus Liguori in Greenwell Springs (1989 to 1992)
- St. George in Baton Rouge (1992 to 1994)
- St. Isidore the Farmer in Baker (1994 to 1995)
- St. Joseph Cathedral (1995 to 1996)

Fabre was later named as pastor at both St. Joseph Parish in Grosse Tête, and Immaculate Heart of Mary Parish in Maringouin. In 2004, Fabre became pastor of Sacred Heart of Jesus Parish in Baton Rouge.

Fabre's diocesan positions during this period were as chaplain at Louisiana State Penitentiary at Angola in 1994, director of the Office of Black Catholics (1990–2005), and defender of the bond for the marriage tribunal (1994 to 2007). Fabre was elected to serve on the diocesan clergy personnel board and served as chair of the Pastoral Planning Committee of the diocese. At various times, he took on the roles of chaplain to St. Joseph's Academy and served as dean of the Northwest Deanery. Fabre also served as a member of the college of consultors, the presbyteral council, and the diocesan school board.

=== Auxiliary Bishop of New Orleans ===
On December 13, 2006, Fabre was appointed titular bishop of Pudentiana and auxiliary bishop of New Orleans by Pope Benedict XVI. He was consecrated by Archbishop Alfred Hughes on February 28, 2007, in New Orleans at the Saint Louis, King of France, Cathedral Basilica. He was the youngest bishop in the U.S. at the time. As auxiliary bishop, Fabre served as vicar general and moderator of the curia. He also became pastor of Our Lady of the Rosary Parish in New Orleans.

In October 2009, Fabre met with each of the plaintiffs in a lawsuit against the archdiocese that had been recently settled for $5 million. The plaintiffs had been beaten and abused in the 1950s and 1960s by nuns, priests and other staff members at Hope Haven and Madonna Manor, two Catholic homes for troubled youth in the archdiocese. Fabre held the meetings to apologize for their treatment.

=== Bishop of Houma-Thibodaux ===
Coat of arms as bishop of Houma-Thibodaux

On September 23, 2013, Pope Francis appointed Fabre as bishop of Houma-Thibodaux. He was installed at the Cathedral of St. Francis de Sales in Thibodaux, Louisiana, on October 30, 2013.

In May 2018, Fabre was elected chair of the Ad-Hoc Committee against Racism of the United States Conference of Catholic Bishops. In November 2018, Fabre released "Open Wide our Hearts: The Enduring Call to Love", a pastoral letter addressing racism in the United States and the Catholic response to it.

In January 2019, Fabre released a list of 14 priests in the diocese with credible accusations of sexual abuse against minors. The list went back to 1977, the founding of the diocese.

=== Archbishop of Louisville ===
On February 8, 2022, Pope Francis named Fabre as archbishop of Louisville. He was installed on March 30, 2022.

== Personal life ==
Fabre is a cousin of his fellow Black Catholic prelate, Bishop John Huston Ricard, superior general of the Josephites. Both are from New Roads, Louisiana.

== See also ==
- Catholic Church hierarchy
- Catholic Church in the United States
- Historical list of the Catholic bishops of the United States
- List of Catholic bishops of the United States
- Lists of patriarchs, archbishops, and bishops

Catholic Church titles
Preceded by Roger Morin	Auxiliary Bishop of New Orleans; 2007–2013	Succeeded by Fernand J. Cheri
Preceded by Sam Jacobs	Bishop of Houma-Thibodaux; 2013–2022	Succeeded by Mario E. Dorsonville
Preceded by Joseph Edward Kurtz	Archbishop of Louisville; 2022–present	Incumbent
