= Warren Louis Boudreaux =

His Excellency, The Most Reverend Warren Louis Boudreaux
- Bishop of Houma-Thibodaux; Titular Bishop of Calynda
- Church: Roman Catholic Church
- See: Diocese of Houma-Thibodaux
- In office: August 25, 1971 to December 29, 1992
- Successor: Charles Michael Jarrell
- Previous posts: Bishop of Beaumont; 1971 to 1977; Auxiliary Bishop of Lafayette in Louisiana; 1962 to 1971

Orders
- Ordination: May 30, 1942 by Jules Jeanmard
- Consecration: July 25, 1962 by Egidio Vagnozzi

Personal details
- Born: January 25, 1918 Berwick, Louisiana, US
- Died: October 6, 1997 (aged 79) Thibodaux, Louisiana, US
- Education: Seminary of Saint-Sulpice; Catholic University of America
- Motto: Sevare unitatem (To preserve unity)

Styles of Warren Louis Boudreaux
- Reference style: His Excellency; The Most Reverend
- Spoken style: Your Excellency
- Religious style: Bishop

Warren Louis Boudreaux (January 25, 1918 – October 6, 1997) was an American prelate of the Roman Catholic Church. He served as the first bishop of the new Diocese of Houma-Thibodaux in Louisiana from 1977 to 1992

Boudreaux previously served as bishop of the Diocese of Beaumont in Texas from 1971 to 1977 and as auxiliary bishop of the Diocese of Lafayette in Louisiana from 1962 to 1971.

== Biography ==
=== Early life ===
Warren Boudreaux was born on January 25, 1918, in Berwick, Louisiana, to Alphonse Louis and Loretta Marie (née Senac) Boudreaux, both of Acadian ancestry. After graduating from Berwick Junior High School, he entered St. Joseph's Seminary in Saint Benedict, Louisiana. Boudreaux then attended Notre Dame Seminary in New Orleans. He was later sent to Paris to study at the Seminary of Saint-Sulpice.

=== Priesthood ===
Returning to Louisiana, he was ordained to the priesthood for the Diocese of Lafayette in Louisiana by Bishop Jules Benjamin Jeanmard on May 30, 1942, in Lafayette, Louisiana. After his ordination, Boudreaux was assigned as a curate at St. Michael's Parish in Crowley, Louisiana. In 1943, the diocese sent him to Washington D.C. to attend the Catholic University of America in Washington, D.C., earning a Doctor of Canon Law degree in 1946.

Returning to Louisiana in 1946, Boudreaux was appointed vice-chancellor of the diocese and secretary to Bishop Jeanmard. In 1950, the Vatican elevated Boudreaux to the rank of a papal chamberlain. In addition to these duties, he served as defender of the bond from 1947 to 1950 and officialis on the diocesan court from 1950 to 1954. Boudreaux was appointed pastor of St. Peter's Parish in New Iberia, Louisiana, a post he would hold until 1971. He was named vicar general of the diocese in 1956 and was raised by the Vatican to the rank of domestic prelate in 1958.

=== Auxiliary Bishop of Lafayette in Louisiana ===
On May 19, 1962, Boudreaux was appointed as an auxiliary bishop of Lafayette in Louisiana and titular bishop of Calynda by Pope John XXIII. He received his episcopal consecration at St. John's Cathedral in Lafayette on July 25, 1962, from Archbishop Egidio Vagnozzi, with Archbishop John Cody and Bishop Maurice Schexnayder serving as co-consecrators.

=== Bishop of Beaumont ===
Coat of arms as bishop of Beaumont

Boudreaux was named as the second bishop of Beaumont by Pope Paul VI on June 4, 1971. He was installed on August 25, 1971. After the end of the Vietnam War, the diocese received national recognition for its resettlement of refugees from what was then South Vietnam. In 1974, Boudreaux began an outreach effort to people who made their living harvesting seafood and working on ships.

=== Bishop of Houma-Thibodaux ===
Boudreaux was appointed the first bishop of the newly erected Diocese of Houma-Thibodaux on March 2, 1977, by Paul VI. He was installed on June 5, 1977. He was well known for placing a ban on church fairs in 1985, objecting to the presence of alcohol and overall frivolity at such events.

Boudreaux's resignation as bishop of Houma-Thibodaux was accepted by Pope John Paul II on December 29, 1992. In 1995, Boudreaux published his autobiography, Memories of a Cajun Bishop. Warren Boudreaux died in Thibodaux, Louisiana, from heart failure on October 6, 1997, at age 79.

== Episcopal succession ==
Catholic Church titles
Preceded by Vincent Madeley Harris	Bishop of Beaumont; 1971–1977	Succeeded by Bernard J. Ganter
Preceded by None	Bishop of Houma-Thibodaux; 1977–1992	Succeeded by Charles Michael Jarrell
