= Charlene Richard =

Cajun Servant of God

Servant of God Charlene Richard
- Born: January 13, 1947; Richard, Acadia Parish, Louisiana, U.S.
- Died: August 11, 1959 (aged 12); Lafayette, Louisiana, U.S.

Charlene Marie Richard (January 13, 1947 – August 11, 1959) was an American Catholic from Richard, Acadia Parish, Louisiana who died of acute lymphoblastic leukemia. She is believed by many to have performed miracles and local Catholics promoted the popular veneration of her for years, leading to the opening of her beatification process in 2020 by the Diocese of Lafayette in Louisiana. She is titled a Servant of God.

== Biography ==
Charlene was the second-oldest of ten children born to Joseph Elvin and Mary Alice Richard. Adults and children who knew her considered her to be smart but otherwise unremarkable. She was a devout Catholic but no more so than was customary in the local Cajun community. Richard's mother said, "She liked sports and was always busy with something. She went to church and said her rosary, but she was just a normal little girl." In May 1959, after reading a book about St. Therese of Lisieux (Note: Therese of Lisieux was a young woman from France who suffered and died from a painful, debilitating illness but offered her suffering to God through prayer and became one of the most popular saints of the twentieth century.) Charlene asked her grandmother whether she, too, could become a saint by praying like St. Therese.

After reporting appearances of a tall woman in black who vanishes, and her teacher recommending that she was not herself, her mother took her to a physician. As a result, only two weeks before her death she was diagnosed with acute lymphatic leukemia and hospitalized at Our Lady of Lourdes Hospital in Lafayette, Louisiana. At the request of her family, she was informed by the hospital chaplain, Joseph Brennan, a newly ordained Catholic priest, that she was going to die. the priest introduced her to the Catholic doctrine of redemptive suffering. Though the illness was painful, she remained cheerful, meekly accepted her fate, and offered up her suffering to God. Fr Brennan was deeply impressed by her faith and visited her daily. While dying, Charlene prayed for other individuals to be healed or to be converted to Catholicism. The Director of Pediatrics at the hospital, Theresita Crowley, a Catholic nun, also witnessed her calm acceptance of suffering and prayers for others. Fr Brennan and Sister Theresita have testified that those for whom Richard prayed recovered from their illnesses or became Catholic. Charlene died on August 11, 1959, and was buried in Richard, Louisiana.

Before her death, Fr Brennan and Sister Theresitay began telling people about Charlene Richard, and the girl's family became aware that there was a belief that she was "special". Fr Floyd J. Calais, a Catholic priest who was at the time the chaplain of Charity Hospital in Lafayette, was a close friend of Fr Brennan. In 1961, Fr Calais began praying to Charlene Richard to be assigned to a parish. He was assigned to St. Edwards parish in Richard, Louisiana — Charlene Richard's burial place—that same year. Once there, he discovered the need to raise money to build a new church there. Calais says that he was "invited to retreats and recollections, and began speaking about Charlene, how she achieved grace before she died" and about the need for money to build a new church in the parish. "People started going to her grave," he said, "and began sending checks to build the church. What I thought would take 8–10 years took 2 1/2." (Note: Calais also prayed to Charlene Richard for help in obtaining the money for St. Edwards. He was subsequently reassigned and prayed to Charlene for money to build a new church at a second parish and to retire a large debt at a third. Receiving the needed funds in all three cases, he later said, "I call her my little money girl".)

As early as the late 1960s and by 1972 at the latest, prayer cards marked "for private devotion only" with a photograph of Charlene Richard, a prayer to her, and a prayer for her beatification were in circulation and xerographic copies were frequently being sent to individuals in need of help. A 1975 series of articles about Richard in the newspaper of the Lafayette diocese spread the cult and were republished in a booklet, Charlene, A Saint from Southwest Louisiana, in 1979. Testimonials by individuals who believed that they had benefited by prayer to Charlene were added and the booklet was again republished in 1988. A widespread belief formed in the area that Charlene Richard would intercede in heaven for people's prayers to be answered.

By 1989, the belief had spread outside the Cajun area. Hundreds of people were visiting Richard's grave each week, which had been illuminated so visits could occur in the evening and a box had been provided in which to leave written petitions to Charlene Richard. On the thirtieth anniversary of her death that year, an outdoor Mass was held there which was attended by four thousand people and which was covered by Louisiana television stations and the Cable News Network, and was reported in newspapers in Louisiana, Dallas, Houston, Miami, Orlando, Albany, and Seattle. The media coverage resulted in knowledge of Richard spreading world-wide, with interest in her expressed in Yugoslavia, Croatia, Australia, and Africa. Approximately a thousand people attended anniversary Masses there in both 1991 and 1999, with about 400 attending in 2007, and thousands come to her grave each year, including chartered buses from New Orleans.

== Veneration ==
Though no beatification process had begun for Richard, the Diocese of Lafayette in Louisiana began collecting in 1991 testimonials about reputed help obtained through her. Unlike the traditional support for beatification, which begins with popular devotion and is only later recognized by the church, support for Richard began outside her immediate home area and was first promoted by the clergy, beginning with Brennan, Crowley, and Calais. The bishop of the Lafayette diocese at the time of her death, Maurice Schexnayder, visited her grave multiple times and referred to her as a saint. Another bishop of the diocese, Harry Flynn, presided at the thirtieth anniversary Mass in 1989, along with sixteen other priests. The diocese also approved the creation of a private organization, the Friends of Charlene, to spread her story.

In January 2020, Bishop J. Douglas Deshotel of the Diocese of Lafayette opened the cause of Richard's beatification during a Saturday Mass at the Immaculata Center in Lafayette, along with Arnaudville teacher and evangelist Auguste Nonco Pelafigue. Following the mass, Richard and Pelafigue were officially named Servant of God.

On November 17, 2021, the USCCB meeting in Baltimore, Maryland voted to advance the cause of Charlene's beatification and canonization.
