= Charles Michael Jarrell =

20th and 21st-century American Catholic bishop

His Excellency, The Most Reverend Charles Michael Jarrell
- Bishop Emeritus of Lafayette in Louisiana
- Diocese: Lafayette in Louisiana
- Appointed: November 8, 2002
- Installed: December 18, 2002
- Retired: February 17, 2016
- Predecessor: Edward Joseph O'Donnell
- Successor: J. Douglas Deshotel
- Previous post: Bishop of Houma–Thibodaux (1993-2002)

Orders
- Ordination: June 3, 1967 by Maurice Schexnayder
- Consecration: March 4, 1993 by Francis B. Schulte, Warren Louis Boudreaux, and Gerard Louis Frey

Personal details
- Born: May 15, 1940 (age 86) Opelousas, Louisiana, US
- Education: The Catholic University of America
- Motto: In omnibus caritas (In all things charity)

Styles of Charles Michael Jarrell
- Reference style: His Excellency; The Most Reverend
- Spoken style: Your Excellency
- Religious style: Bishop

Charles Michael Jarrell (May 15, 1940) is an American Catholic retired prelate who served as bishop of Lafayette in Louisiana from 2002 to 2016. Jarrell served as bishop of Houma–Thibodaux in Louisiana from 1993 to 2002.

== Biography ==
=== Early life ===
Michael Jarrell was born on May 15, 1940, in Opelousas, Louisiana to William Jarrell Sr. and Jessie Rosa Barnett Jarrell. He attended public schools in Opelousas, then entered the Immaculata Minor Seminary in Lafayette, Louisiana. In 1960, Jarrell enrolled in Catholic University of America in Washington, D.C., earning a Bachelor of Arts in philosophy degree in 1962 and a Master of Philosophy degree in 1963. Jarrell was ordained to the subdiaconate and then the diaconate in June 1966 by Auxiliary Bishop Warren L. Boudreaux.

=== Priesthood ===
On June 3, 1967, Jarrell was ordained a priest for the Diocese of Lafayette in Louisiana by Bishop Maurice Schexnayder at the Cathedral of Saint John the Evangelist in Lafayette.

After his ordination, the diocese assigned Jarrell as a teacher at Landry High School in Lake Charles, Louisiana. In 1972, he was assigned as associate pastor to St. Michael Parish in Crowley, Louisiana. Jerrell was named pastor in 1976 of Sacred Heart Parish in Broussard, Louisiana, then in 1984 was moved to Sacred Heart Parish in Ville Platte, Louisiana. Jarrell remained in Ville Platte until 1993.

Jarrell also served as regional vicar of three deaneries, as diocesan consultor and as chairman of the Clergy Continuing Education Committee. In 1988, Pope John Paul II named Jarrell a prelate of honor.

=== Bishop of Houma-Thibodaux ===
On March 4, 1993, John Paul II appointed Jarrell as bishop of Houma–Thibodaux. He was consecrated at the Cathedral of St. Francis de Sales in Houma, Louisiana, on March 4, 1993, by Archbishop Francis Schulte.

=== Bishop of Lafayette in Louisiana ===
On November 8, 2002, John Paul II appointed Jarrell as bishop of Lafayette in Louisiana. He was installed on December 18, 2002 at the Cathedral of Saint John the Evangelist. In 2015, it was revealed that ten years previously, the diocese had paid a $26 million settlement to the families of 123 children who were sexually abused by diocese priests between 1959 and 2002. The Daily Advertiser urged the release of the priests' names, but Jarrell refused, saying that he could not see the point.

=== Retirement ===
On February 18, 2016, Pope Francis accepted Jarrell's letter of resignation as bishop of Lafayette in Louisiana and appointed Auxiliary Bishop J. Douglas Deshotel to succeed him.

Catholic Church titles
| Preceded by Edward Joseph O'Donnell | Bishop of Lafayette in Louisiana; 2002–2016 | Succeeded by J. Douglas Deshotel |
| Preceded by Warren Louis Boudreaux | Bishop of Houma–Thibodaux; 1993–2002 | Succeeded by Sam Jacobs |
