= Gerard Louis Frey =

American prelate

His Excellency, The Most Reverend Gerard Louis Frey
- Bishop of Lafayette
- See: Diocese of Lafayette
- In office: 1967-1989
- Predecessor: Maurice Schexnayder
- Successor: Harry Flynn
- Previous post: Bishop of Savannah (1967–1972)

Orders
- Ordination: April 2, 1938 by Joseph Francis Rummel
- Consecration: August 8, 1968 by Philip Hannan

Personal details
- Born: May 10, 1914 New Orleans, Louisiana, US
- Died: August 16, 2007 (aged 93) New Iberia, Louisiana, US
- Buried: Cathedral of Saint John the Evangelist
- Denomination: Roman Catholic
- Parents: Andrew Francis and Marie Theresa (née DeRose) Frey
- Education: St. Joseph College Seminary; Notre Dame Seminary
- Motto: Serviam (I will serve)

Styles of Gerard Louis Frey
- Reference style: His Excellency; The Most Reverend
- Spoken style: Your Excellency
- Religious style: Bishop

Gerard Louis Frey (May 10, 1914 – August 16, 2007) was an American prelate of the Roman Catholic Church. He served as the bishop of the Diocese of Savannah in Georgia (1967–1972) and bishop of the Diocese of Lafayette in Louisiana (1972–1989).

== Biography ==
=== Early life and education ===
One of nine children, Gerard Frey was born on May 10, 1914, in New Orleans, Louisiana, to Andrew Francis and Marie Theresa (née DeRose) Frey. Two of his brothers also entered the priesthood. After attending St. Vincent de Paul School, Frey studied at St. Joseph College Seminary in Saint Benedict, Louisiana, from 1928 to 1932. He then entered Notre Dame Seminary in New Orleans, where he completed his theological studies.

=== Ordination and ministry ===
Frey was ordained a priest by Archbishop Joseph Rummel for the Archdiocese of New Orleans on April 2, 1938, in New Orleans. After his ordination, the archdiocese named Frey as a curate at Holy Rosary Parish in Taft, Louisiana. In 1946, he was named director of the archdiocesan Confraternity of Christian Doctrine. While serving as director, he resided at St. Leo the Great Parish rectory in New Orleans.

Frey was named a papal chamberlain by Pope Pius XII in 1949, and was appointed pastor of St. Frances Cabrini Parish at New Orleans in 1952. He was named a domestic prelate by the Vatican in 1954. Frey attended the Second Vatican Council in Rome from 1962 to 1965 as a pastoral representative. He was later made pastor of St. Francis de Sales Parish in Houma, Louisiana.

=== Bishop of Savannah ===
On May 31, 1967, Frey was appointed the eleventh bishop of Savannah by Pope Paul VI. He received his episcopal consecration on August 8, 1967, from Archbishop Philip Hannan, with Bishops Charles Greco and Robert Tracy serving as co-consecrators. He selected as his episcopal motto: Serviam (Latin: "I will serve").

During his tenure, Frey launched the Social Apostolate, a social service agency designed "to put people in the pews in touch with the poor." He also encouraged every parish in the diocese to establish a parish council.

=== Bishop of Lafayette in Louisiana ===
On November 7, 1972, Frey was appointed the third bishop of Lafayette in Louisiana by Paul VI. During his tenure, he initiated reorganization plans that increased and expanded participation by clergy, religious, and laity in diocesan affairs. He also named the first woman to serve as chancellor of a Catholic diocese in the United States. In 1987, he opened a diocesan synod.

Frey was the bishop of Lafayette when the diocese and the Catholic Church faced the first wave of civil suits seeking compensation and treatment for abused children. In a legal deposition, Frey admitted to confronting Reverend Gilbert Gauthe, a diocesan priest, about sexual abuse accusations in 1974. According to Frey, Gauthe admitted being guilty of "imprudent touches" with a boy and promised that it was an isolated instance that would not recur. In 1975, Frey appointed Gauthe as chaplain of the diocesan Boy Scouts troop. Gauthe later confessed to sexually abusing 37 children, though he pleaded not guilty to criminal charges by reason of insanity. Gauthe was ultimately convicted.

=== Retirement and death ===
Pope John Paul II accepted Frey's resignation as bishop of Lafayette in Louisiana on May 13, 1989. He was succeeded by his coadjutor bishop, Harry Flynn. Frey retired to a family compound in Bay St. Louis, Mississippi, which was heavily damaged by Hurricane Katrina in 2005. His brother Jerome drove to Bay St. Louis to rescue Frey, returning him to Louisiana.

Frey spent the remainder of his life first at Consolata Nursing Home in New Iberia, Louisiana, and later in a private home in Lafayette provided by the diocese. Gerard Frey died after a lengthy illness on August 16, 2007, at age 93. He is buried in the crypt of the Cathedral of Saint John the Evangelist in Lafayette.

== See also ==
- Catholic Church hierarchy
- Catholic Church in the United States
- Historical list of the Catholic bishops of the United States
- List of Catholic bishops of the United States
- Lists of patriarchs, archbishops, and bishops

Catholic Church titles
Preceded by Thomas Joseph McDonough	Bishop of Savannah; 1967–1972	Succeeded by Raymond W. Lessard
Preceded by Maurice Schexnayder	Bishop of Lafayette in Louisiana; 1972–1989	Succeeded by Harry Flynn
