= Archbishop Hannan =

Archbishop Hannan may refer to:

- Philip Hannan (1913–2011), former Archbishop of New Orleans (1965–1988)
- Archbishop Hannan High School in St. Tammany Parish, Louisiana
