= Brothers and Sisters of Penance of Saint Francis =

Roman Catholic association of the faithful

The Brothers and Sisters of Penance of St. Francis is an association of the faithful of the Roman Catholic Church whose members strive to model their lives according to the Rule and Statutes of the Primitive Rule of the Third Order of St. Francis, which was written for lay people in 1221 by Cardinal Hugolino dei Conti dei Segni at the request of St. Francis of Assisi.

The order was originally started in 1996 by members of the Archdiocese of St. Paul and Minneapolis in Minnesota, with the approval of Archbishop Harry J. Flynn.

On August 22, 2003, ( the feast of the Queenship of Mary), the Brothers and Sisters of Penance was refounded as the Confraternity of Penitents.

Right now there are more than several hundred members within the United States, and a few hundred more throughout the world.
