= Ryan Stawaisz =

American priest

The Reverend Ryan Stawaisz
- Church: Catholic Church

Orders
- Ordination: 1 June 2019 by Cardinal Daniel DiNardo

Personal details
- Born: Ryan Andrew Stawaisz; August 18, 1989 Aberdeen, Scotland, United Kingdom
- Died: June 21, 2021 (aged 31) Tomball, Texas, United States

Ryan Andrew Stawaisz (18 August 1989 – 21 June 2021) was an American Catholic priest in the Archdiocese of Galveston-Houston. He died of cancer in 2021 and is under consideration for a sainthood cause.

== Biography ==
Stawaisz was born in Aberdeen, Scotland, on 18 August 1989 to Ray and Susan Stawaisz. He served as an altar boy and moved with his family multiple times before they settled in Tomball, Texas, in 2004 when he was 14.

Stawaisz attended Texas A&M University, studying petroleum engineering and graduating in 2011. During his studies, Stawaisz was diagnosed with cancer; however, after several months of treatment including surgery, he recovered. After attending a Catholic retreat (Aggie Awakening Retreat), he was inspired to join the priesthood.

After graduating from college, Stawaisz entered Saint Joseph Seminary College in Covington, Louisiana, where he earned a degree in philosophy. He went on to study at Saint Mary's Seminary in Houston, Texas, and shortly before his ordination, he received another cancer diagnosis. He was ordained to the diaconate and eventually to the priesthood on 1 June 2019.

He began his ministry at Prince of Peace Catholic Church as a parochial vicar. He continued ministering even while undergoing cancer treatment. Stawaisz died on 21 June 2021 at the age of 31.

== Legacy ==
A film entitled Love God's Will: The True Story of Fr. Ryan Stawaisz was produced by Palomita Films about his life. As well as recounting Stawaisz's biography, it explores the case for him being beatified.
