= J. Douglas Deshotel =

American Catholic prelate

His Excellency, The Most Reverend John Douglas Deshotel
- Bishop of Lafayette
- Church: Catholic Church
- Diocese: Lafayette
- Appointed: February 17, 2016
- Installed: April 15, 2016
- Predecessor: Charles Michael Jarrell
- Previous post: Auxiliary Bishop of Dallas and Titular Bishop of Cova (2010-2016)

Orders
- Ordination: May 13, 1978 by Maurice Schexnayder
- Consecration: April 27, 2010 by Kevin Joseph Farrell, Charles Victor Grahmann, and Michael Duca

Personal details
- Born: January 6, 1952 (age 74) Basile, Louisiana, US
- Education: Holy Trinity Seminary; University of Dallas
- Motto: Christus caritas urget me (The love of Christ compels me)

Styles of John Douglas Deshotel
- Reference style: His Excellency; The Most Reverend
- Spoken style: Your Excellency
- Religious style: Bishop

John Douglas Deshotel (born January 6, 1952) is an American prelate of the Catholic Church who has been serving as bishop of the Diocese of Lafayette in Louisiana since 2016. He served as an auxiliary bishop of the Diocese of Dallas in Texas from 2010 to 2016.

== Biography ==
=== Early life ===
John Deshotel was born on January 6, 1952, in Basile, Louisiana, one of eight children of Welfoot Paul Deshotel and Luna Marie Manuel. Deciding as a teenager to become a priest, John Deshotel entered Immaculata Minor Seminary High School in Lafayette, Louisiana.

After graduating from high school, Deshotel went to Holy Trinity Seminary in Irving, Texas. He received a Bachelor of Arts in philosophy from Holy Trinity. He continued his formation as a priest at the University of Dallas, where he received a Master of Divinity degree.

=== Priesthood ===
Deshotel was ordained a priest at Saint Augustine Church in Basile by Bishop Maurice Schexnayder on May 13, 1978, for the Diocese of Dallas. After his 1978 ordination, the diocese assigned Deshotel as parochial vicar at the following Texas parishes:

- St. Patrick in Dallas (1978 to 1980)
- St. Anthony Parish in Longview (1980 to 1982)
- St. Elizabeth of Hungary in Dallas (1982 to 1983)
- St. Thomas Aquinas Parish in Longview (1983 to 1988)

Deshotel was named pastor in 1988 of St. William Parish in Greenville, Texas, a position he held for the next four years. The diocese transferred him in 1992 to St. John Nepomucene Parish in Ennis, Texas, to serve as pastor there. He moved in 1995 to St. Luke Parish in Irving, Texas. In 2001, Bishop Charles Grahmann named Deshotel as vice rector of Holy Trinity Seminary. After four years at the seminary, Deshotel became pastor of St. Monica and St. Juan Diego Parish in Dallas.

In 2008, Bishop Kevin Farrell named Deshotel as vicar general and moderator of the curia. He was also transferred from St. Monica and St. Juan Diego Parish to St. Joseph Parish in Richardson, Texas.

=== Auxiliary Bishop of Dallas ===
Deshotel was appointed as auxiliary bishop of Dallas as well as titular bishop of Cova on March 11, 2010, by Pope Benedict XVI. Deshotel was consecrated by Bishop Kevin Farrell at the National Shrine Cathedral of Our Lady of Guadalupe in Dallas on April 27, 2010. Bishops Charles Grahmann and Michael Duca served as co-consecrators.

=== Bishop of Lafayette in Louisiana ===
On February 17, 2016, Pope Francis named Deshotel as bishop of Lafayette in Louisiana, succeeding Bishop Charles Jarrell. He was installed on April 15, 2016, in the Cathedral of St. John the Evangelist at Lafayette, Louisiana, by Archbishop Gregory Aymond. In July 2022, Deshotel released a list of 41 diocesan clergy who had been credibly accused of sexual abuse of minors and adults.

In March 2024, Deshotel excommunicated Scott Peyton, a former deacon, for leaving the Catholic Church with his family. In 2018, Peyton's son Oliver Peyton had accused Reverend Michael Guidry of sexually assaulting him when he was 16 years old. Guidry was sentenced to seven years in prison in 2019 for the crime. The diocese paid a court-ordered financial settlement to the Peyton family in 2021. Scott Peyton resigned as deacon in December 2023 and told Deshotel the family was leaving the church.

== See also ==
- Catholic Church hierarchy
- Catholic Church in the United States
- Historical list of the Catholic bishops of the United States
- List of Catholic bishops of the United States
- Lists of patriarchs, archbishops, and bishops
- Roman Catholic Diocese of Dallas

Catholic Church titles
Preceded by Charles Michael Jarrell	Bishop of Lafayette in Louisiana; 2016–Present	Succeeded by Incumbent
Preceded by –	Auxiliary Bishop of Dallas; 2010–2016	Succeeded by Gregory Kelly
Preceded by Joe Steve Vásquez	Roman Catholic Titular See of Cova; 2010–2016	Succeeded by Vacant
