= Harry Joseph Flynn =

American Roman Catholic archbishop (1933–2019)

His Excellency, The Most Reverend Harry Joseph Flynn
- Archbishop of Saint Paul and Minneapolis
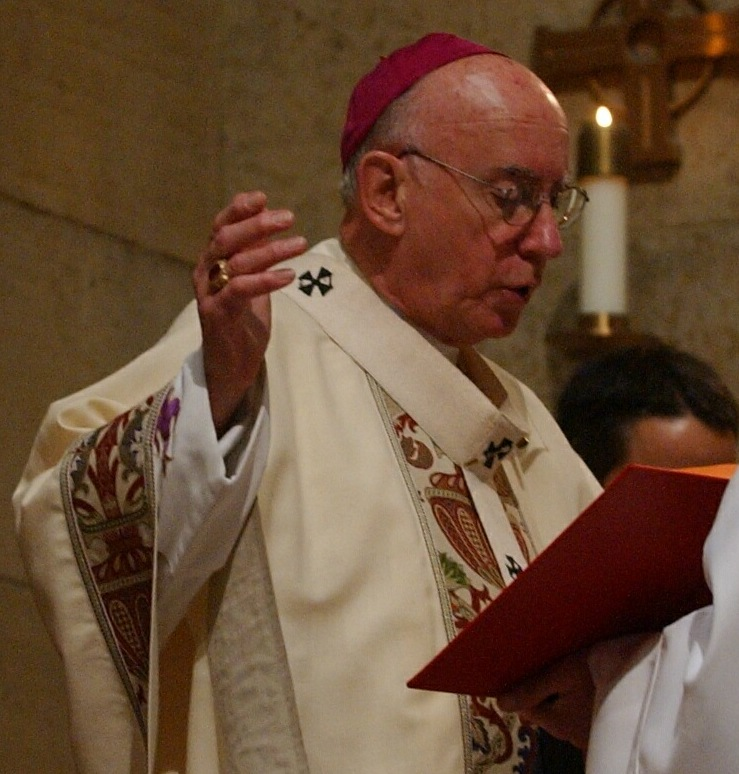
- Archbishop Flynn in 2009
- Archdiocese: Saint Paul and Minneapolis
- Appointed: February 22, 1994 (Coadjutor)
- Installed: September 8, 1995
- Term ended: May 2, 2008
- Predecessor: John Roach
- Successor: John Nienstedt
- Previous posts: Bishop of Lafayette in Louisiana (1989 to 1994); Coadjutor Bishop of Lafayette in Louisiana (1986 to 1989)

Orders
- Ordination: May 28, 1960 by William Scully
- Consecration: June 24, 1986 by Howard James Hubbard, Philip Matthew Hannan, Gerard Louis Frey

Personal details
- Born: May 2, 1933 Schenectady, New York, U.S.
- Died: September 22, 2019 (aged 86) Saint Paul, Minnesota, U.S.
- Education: Mount Saint Mary's Seminary; Siena College
- Motto: Come Lord Jesus

Styles of Harry Joseph Flynn
- Reference style: His Excellency; The Most Reverend
- Spoken style: Your Excellency
- Religious style: Archbishop

Harry Joseph Flynn (May 2, 1933 – September 22, 2019) was an American prelate of the Catholic Church who served as archbishop of the Archdiocese of Saint Paul and Minneapolis from 1995 to 2008. He previously served as bishop of the Diocese of Lafayette from 1989 to 1994.

== Biography ==
=== Early life ===
Harry Flynn was born in Schenectady, New York, on May 3, 1933, to William and Margaret Mahoney Flynn. Orphaned when he was age 12, he was primarily raised primarily by two aunts. Flynn attended from Siena College in Loudonville, New York, earning bachelor's and master's degrees in English. He then attended Mount Saint Mary's Seminary in Emmitsburg, Maryland,

=== Priesthood ===
Flynn was ordained to the priesthood in Albany, New York, by Bishop William Scully on May 18, 1960, for the Diocese of Albany. After his ordination, Flynn was an Assisant Pastor at St. Margaret of Cortona Church in Rotterdam Junction from June-September 1960. Flynn taught English and Religion at Catholic Central High School and also served as an Assisant Pastor at St. Peter's Church in Troy, New York from 1960-1965. In 1965, Flynn went to Maryland to become a faculty member and dean at Mount Saint Mary's Seminary. Flynn was promoted to vice-rector in 1968 and rector in 1970. He was also executive secretary of The Mount St. Mary's College National Alumni Association in 1968. After he returned to Albany in 1979, he was appointed director of clergy continuing education until 1981 and in 1981 was appointed pastor of St. Ambrose Parish in Latham, New York. Flynn also served on the Priests Personnel Board from 1982-1986.

One day in 1986, Flynn's secretary in Albany received a phone call from the papal nuncio for the United States. When she told Flynn to call him back, he realized that the pope was going to appoint him as a bishop. In an attempt to dodge the conversation with the nuncio, Flynn drove to a family cabin on Shroon Lake in New York. Cardinal John O'Connor sent a New York state trooper to bring Flynn back to Albany to call the papal nuncio. Flynn later remarked "If I had 100 lives, I'd live every one of them as a priest - and none as a bishop!"

=== Coadjutor Bishop and Bishop of Lafayette in Louisiana ===
Pope John Paul II appointed Flynn as coadjutor bishop of Lafayette in Louisiana on April 19, 1986. Howard Hubbard consecrated Flynn on June 24, 1986. Flynn succeeded Gerard Frey, who resigned on May 12, 1989. Following the recommendation of Thomas P. Doyle, Flynn served under Frey for three years before taking over the position due to the fallout from the Gilbert Gauthe child sexual abuse scandal.

However, upon arriving in Lafayette, Doyle referred Flynn to local lawyer Ray Mouton, an expert in the Gauthe case, to discuss the scandal and explore ways to support victims. Mouton later claimed that Flynn never contacted him. Another local lawyer, Anthony Fontana, reached out to Flynn regarding a different priest accused of sexual abuse, Reverend Gilbert Dutel. Flynn responded by saying that Dutel had been "cured" and that he needed to keep him due to a priest shortage.

Flynn recruited Sister Bartholomew DeRouen to speak with the parents of the children abused by Gauthe. He later testified that he felt uncomfortable meeting with the families himself and believed that a woman could communicate more effectively. However, Flynn did not provide DeRouen with the names of the victims, so she had to find them on her own.

Additionally, Flynn reportedly told a parent of a child molested by Gauthe that the diocese was wrong to keep Gauthe in ministry and that it had mishandled the situation, but there was nothing he could do about it.

=== Coadjutor Archbishop and Archbishop of Saint Paul and Minneapolis ===
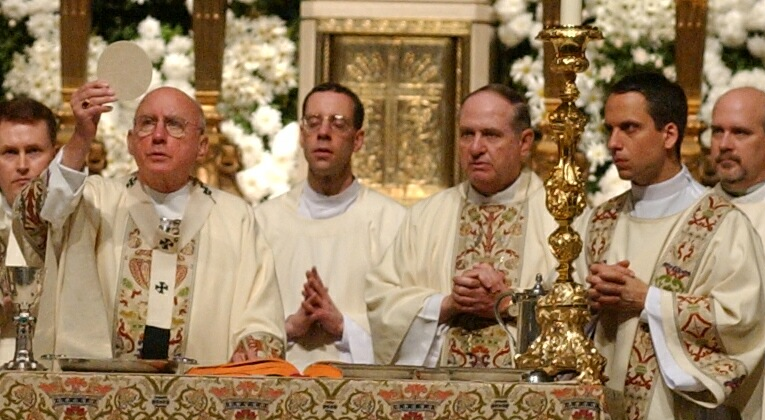
Flynn (holding host) celebrating mass in 2004

On February 22, 1994, Flynn was appointed by John Paul II as the coadjutor archbishop of Saint Paul and Minneapolis. He became archbishop on September 8, 1995, upon the resignation of Archbishop John Robert Roach.

In 1996, Flynn testified in a sexual abuse lawsuit brought against the archdiocese by Dale Scheffler. The plaintiff claimed that he had been sexually abused by Reverend Robert Kapoun, an archdiocese priest, in the 1970s and 1980s, and that the archdiocese had covered up his alleged crimes. During the trial, Kapoun admitted to abusing three boys, and records revealed that the archdiocese had made secret settlements to other victims of Kapoun. When questioned in court, Flynn could not recall any details of the case. Although Scheffler won the case, it was overturned on appeal. Flynn only removed Kapoun from the ministry after the court case had started, and the archdiocese subsequently sent Scheffler a bill for its legal costs.

In 2002, Flynn led the committee at the US Conference of Catholic Bishops that wrote the "Charter for the Protection of Children and Young People" and the "Essential Norms for Diocesan/Eparchial Policies Dealing with Allegations of Sexual Abuse of Minors by Priests or Deacons". These two documents would set policy in the United States for dealing with sexual abuse allegations against priests, deacons and other clergy, with the notable exception of bishops.

In May 2005, Flynn publicly criticized Minnesota Governor Tim Pawlenty in the Star Tribune for what he perceived as irresponsible tax policies. Flynn was an outspoken opponent of the war in Iraq. After serving as archbishop for 12 years, Flynn requested that the pope assign him a coadjutor archbishop. On April 24, 2007, Pope Benedict XVI appointed John Nienstedt as Flynn's coadjutor.

In January 2008, Flynn, citing a Vatican instruction from 2004, ordered an end to the practice of lay preaching at mass. He said:

"There has to be that kind of training and theological background that even a person with a master's degree in theology would not have. The church does not want people just standing up there and giving opinions or even things they've read in books."

=== Retirement ===
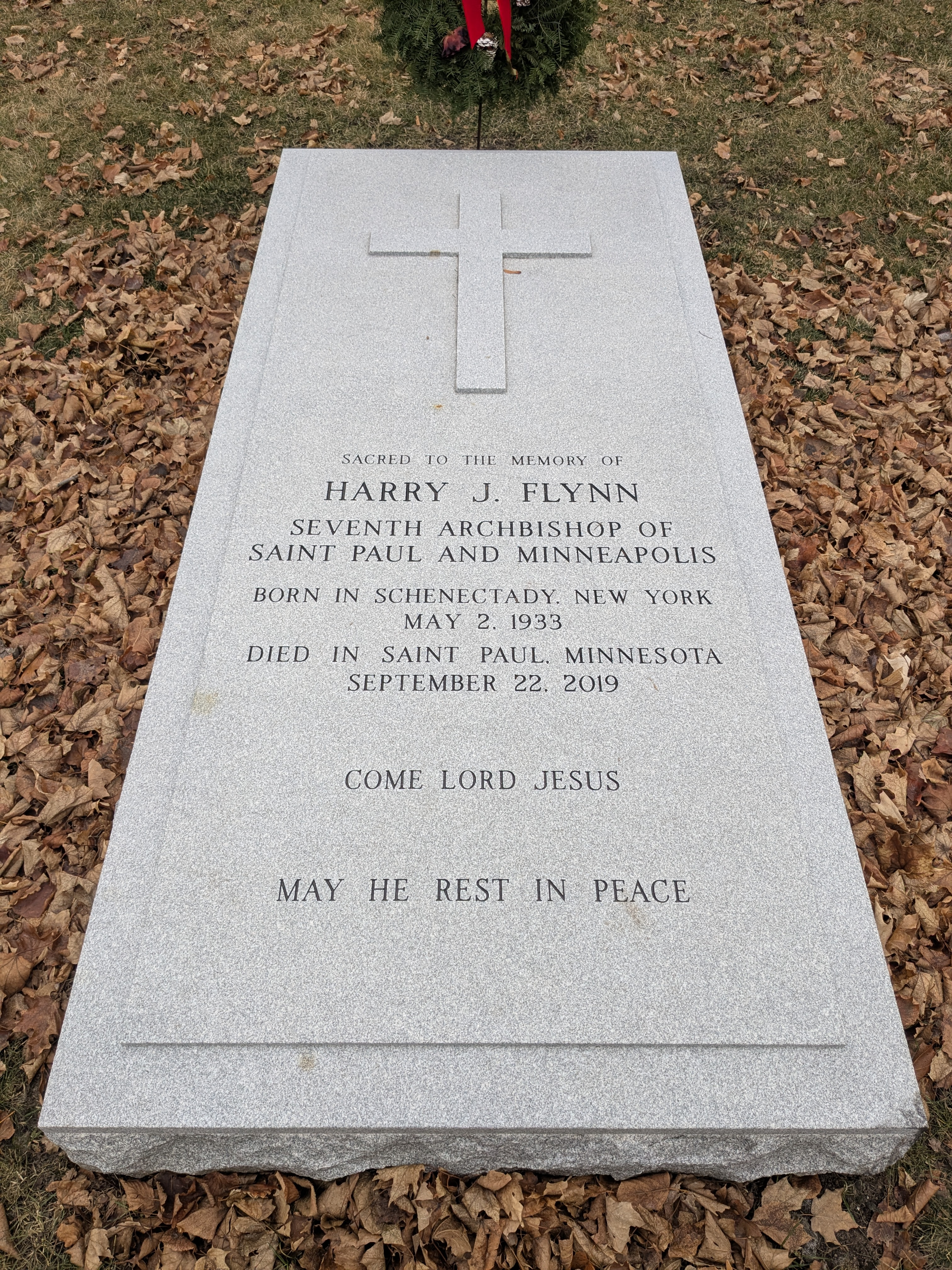
The grave of Archbishop Harry Flynn at Resurrection Cemetery in Mendota Heights, Minnesota (2024)

On May 5, 2008, Benedict XVI accepted Flynn's resignation as archbishop of Saint Paul and Minneapolis and Nienstedt succeeded him as archbishop. Flynn continued to assist in the archdiocese after his retirement, administering confirmations, leading retreats, and other liturgies.

In November 2010, the Little Sisters of the Poor honored Flynn with their St. Jeanne Jugan Award on the 50th anniversary of his ordination. He resigned from the board of the University of St. Thomas in St. Paul on October 14, 2013. Harry Flynn died on September 22, 2019, from bone cancer in Saint Paul, Minnesota at the age of 86. He was buried at Resurrection Cemetery in Mendota Heights, Minnesota.

== Appointments ==
- Board member at The Catholic University of America
- Chair of the board at Saint Paul Seminary School of Divinity
- Chair of the board at the University of St. Thomas
- Board president of Saint John Vianney Seminary
- Board member of the College of Saint Catherine
- Member of the United States Conference of Catholic Bishops (USCCB) Committee for Black Catholics
- Chair of the USCCB Committee on Sexual Abuse
- Member of the USCCB Committee on the Charismatic Renewal Movement.

== Viewpoints ==
=== Abortion ===
In a 1996 pastoral letter titled "Abortion and a Failure of Community", Flynn talked about the need to provide support to pregnant women who choose not terminate their pregnancy with an abortion. He said:

I want our local church to say loudly and clearly: "No woman should feel so alone that abortion seems her only alternative. No man need feel so trapped or fearful that he believes there is no other answer." I want us to be able to say to any woman: "Come to any Catholic parish in this archdiocese and you will find help."

=== Racism ===
On September 12, 2003, Flynn released a pastoral letter titled In God's Image, in which he called for the parishes in the archdiocese to work on ending racism and promote diversity and harmony, and in so doing, to make God's love more present to the rest of the world He said:

Racism is a serious moral evil. It is a sin. This has been the clear message from the moral teaching of the Church. Both the Scriptures and contemporary Church teaching help us to understand why racism is such a serious violation of God's will.

=== LGBT rights ===
In 2005, Flynn sent a letter to the Rainbow Sash Alliance telling them that anyone wearing a rainbow sash to church in the archdiocese would be denied communion. He said:

"The criterion for reception of the Eucharist is the same for all – recipients must be in a state of Grace and free from Mortal sin. While the decision for that judgment rests with an individual Catholic's conscience, it has never been nor is it now acceptable for a communicant to use the reception of Communion as an act of protest."

== Legacy ==
In 2009, the University of St. Thomas renamed Selby Hall to Flynn Hall to recognize Flynn.

== See also ==
- Catholic Church hierarchy
- Catholic Church in the United States
- Historical list of the Catholic bishops of the United States
- List of Catholic bishops of the United States
- Lists of patriarchs, archbishops, and bishops

Catholic Church titles
Preceded by John Roach	Archbishop of St. Paul and Minneapolis; 1995–2008	Succeeded by John Clayton Nienstedt
Preceded by Gerard Louis Frey	Bishop of Lafayette in Louisiana; 1986–1995	Succeeded by Edward Joseph O'Donnell
