= Saint Benedict, Louisiana =

- Unincorporated community
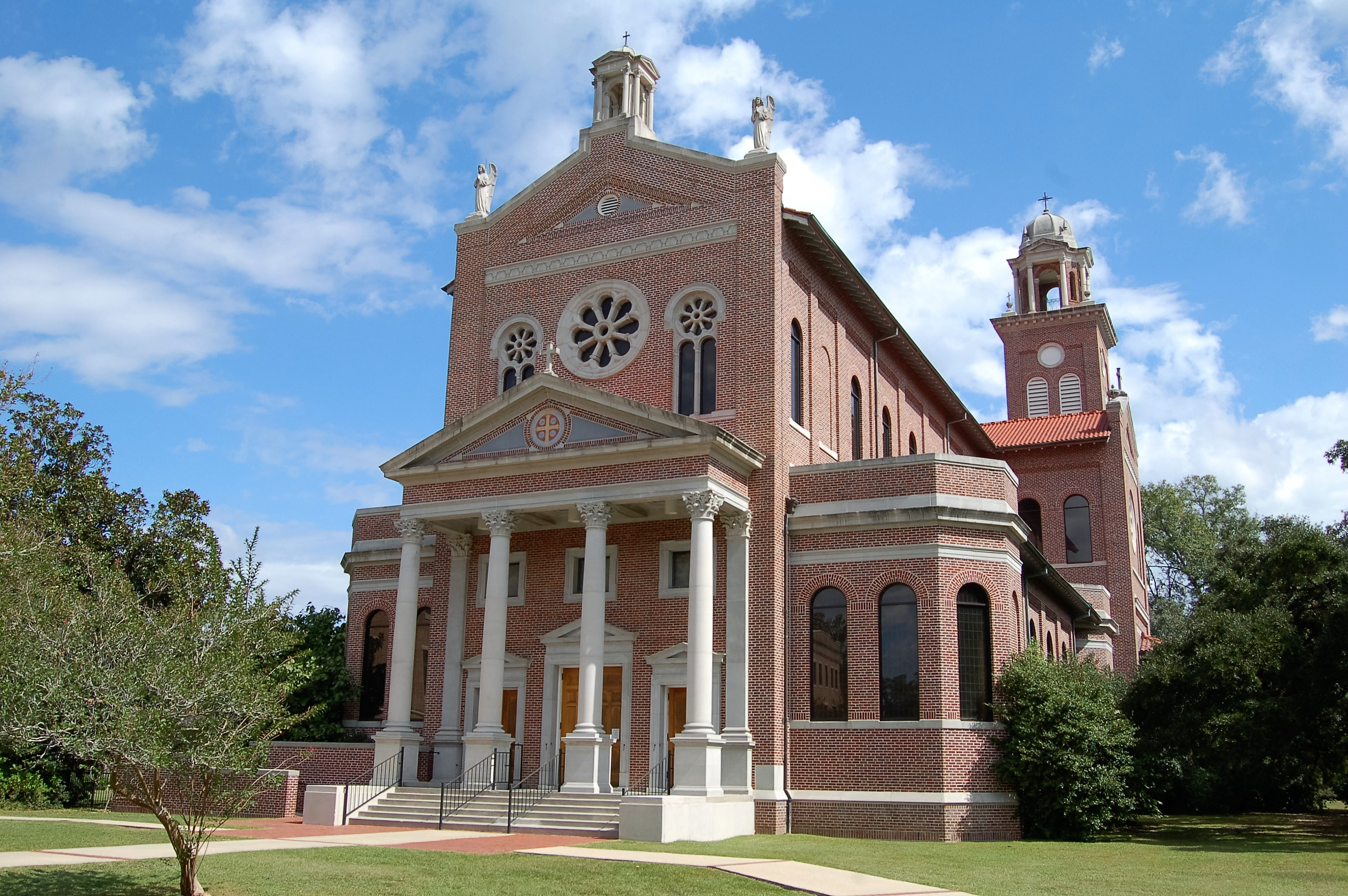
- St. Joseph Abbey Church

- Location within Louisiana Location within the United States
- Coordinates: 30°31′37″N 90°06′45″W
- Country: United States
- State: Louisiana
- Parish: St. Tammany
- Elevation: 43 ft (13 m)
- Time zone: UTC-6 (Central (CST))
  - Summer (DST): UTC-5 (CDT)
- ZIP code: 70457
- Area code: 985
- GNIS feature ID: 1628097

Saint Benedict (also Cedar Hill) is an unincorporated community in St. Tammany Parish, Louisiana, United States. Its ZIP code is 70457.

== Religion ==
- The Roman Catholic abbey and seminary St. Joseph Abbey is in the community as well as their Saint Joseph Seminary College.
