= Saint Joseph Abbey (Louisiana) =

Benedictine monastery in Saint Benedict, Louisiana

St. Joseph Abbey
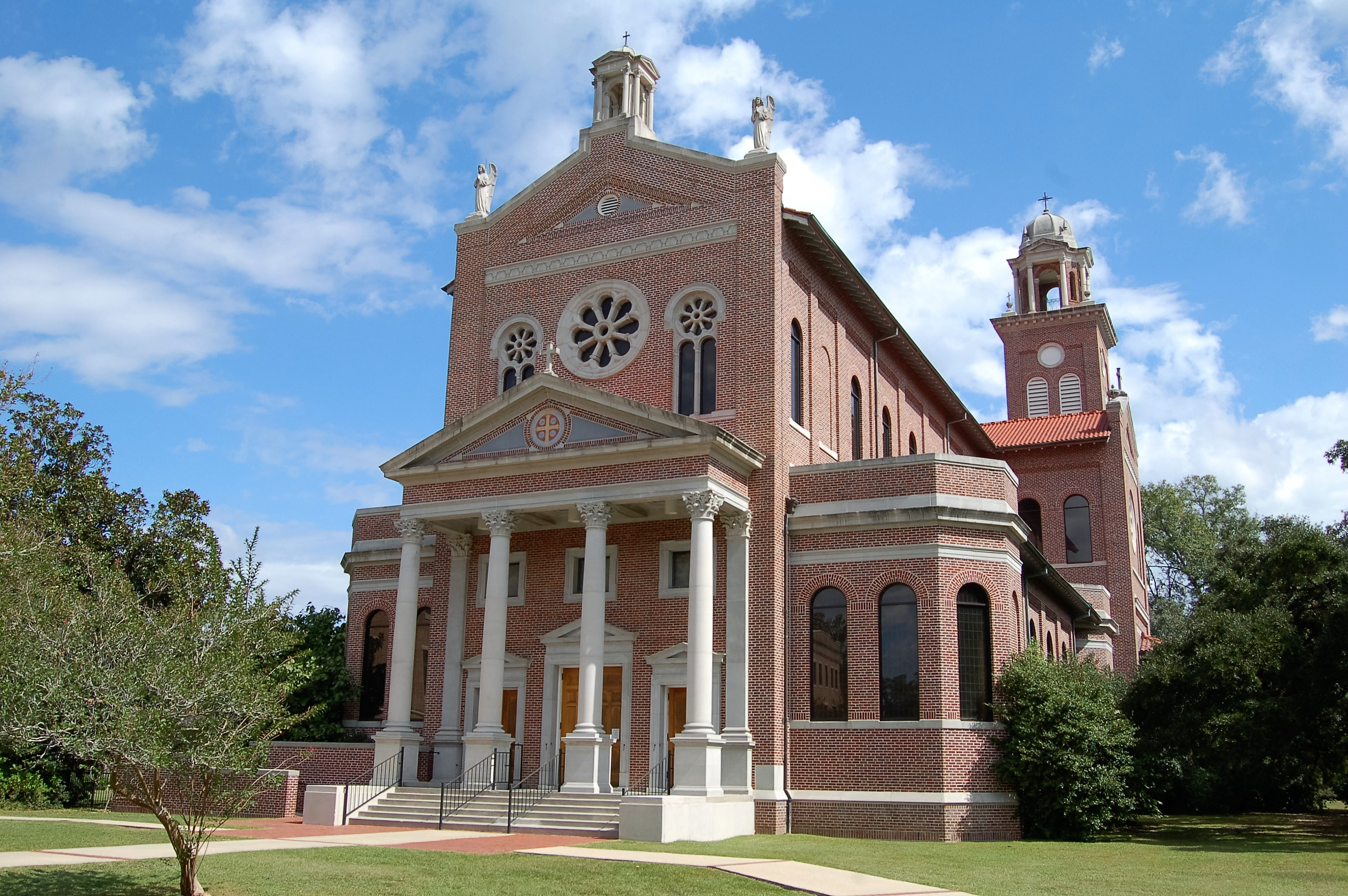
- St. Joseph Abbey Church

- Location within Louisiana Location within the United States

Monastery information
- Order: Order of Saint Benedict
- Established: 1889
- Mother house: St. Meinrad Archabbey
- Diocese: Archdiocese of New Orleans

People
- Abbot: Rt. Rev. Gregory Boquet
- Prior: Brother Brian Harrington

Site
- Location: Saint Benedict, Louisiana, U.S.
- Coordinates: 30°31′36″N 90°06′48″W
- Public access: Yes
- Website: www.saintjosephabbey.com
- Saint Joseph Abbey Church
- U.S. National Register of Historic Places
- Architectural style: Romanesque Revival
- NRHP reference No.: 07000165
- Added to NRHP: March 21, 2007

Saint Joseph Abbey is a Benedictine abbey in Saint Benedict, Louisiana, governed by the Swiss-American Congregation of the Benedictine Confederation. The monks of the abbey also operate Saint Joseph Seminary College.

== History ==
St. Joseph Abbey was founded in 1889 by a group of monks from St. Meinrad Archabbey in Indiana. These monks from Indiana traveled to Louisiana at the invitation of the Most Reverend Francis Janssens to form a college seminary for training local vocations. Up until this time the diocese of New Orleans was being staffed by foreign pastors and was in desperate need for native born priests. St. Benedict, Louisiana was not the first choice for the establishment of a monastery and seminary college. The traveling monks from St. Meinrad Abbey originally chose a spot of land consisting of seventeen hundred acres located in Ponchatoula, Louisiana near Baton Rouge. The monks arrived at this location in 1889 and founded a monastery and seminary. They named the original establishment Gessen. After just a few years at this location, the monks encountered many hardships including unworkable land, and illness caused by mosquitoes. In 1902 the monks decided to relocate the monastery and seminary to a former rice plantation at St. Benedict, Louisiana near Covington north of New Orleans. The monks changed the name of the monastery and seminary from Gessen to St. Joseph. The present location of St. Joseph Abbey occupies a total of 1,500 acres (6.1 km^{2}) of piney wooded land.

=== Seminary College ===
The main focus of the monks of St. Joseph Abbey has always been the education and formation of future priests. In the many years since its founding, the seminary has seen many changes. The seminary started off as a boarding school for young boys who ranged in age from 13 to 18. As the number of boys increased and the formation process evolved, the school later became a four-year seminary high school and a two-year college. Young men would attend St. Joseph Seminary from grade 9 until their second year of college, and would then attend a major seminary, for Theology, before moving on to ordination for the Catholic priesthood. In the early days of the seminary the students and priests (ordained monks) shared the newly built monastery. The priests resided on the first floor, the students on the second, and classrooms and the chapel on the third. The brothers of the community (the monks who were not ordained priests) occupied a separate house apart from the monastery building. Today the seminary has become an undergraduate college offering bachelor's degrees in Liberal Arts to men seeking to become Roman Catholic Priests. It occupies its own buildings complete with classrooms, dorms, and recreational rooms. The seminary buildings are totally separated from the monastery. Even though the monastery has taken on numerous types of ministries in the past century the seminary remains its main focus. The rector, vice-rector, and some of the teaching staff are monks from the monastery. In March 2016 flood waters of the Bogue Falaya River inundated the campus.

=== Monastery ===
The monks of St. Joseph Abbey have met with very harsh circumstance ever since their arrival in 1889. The first monastery building was built soon after the monks arrival to St. Benedict, Louisiana around 1901 and was mostly a wooden structure. In 1907, about five years after its completion the monastery was completely destroyed by fire. A new monastery was constructed out of steel and brick that was constructed thanks to the Fabacher family, owners of the Jackson brewery in New Orleans, and by Andrew Carnegie, who donated a shipment of steel. The monks' individual talents, training, and past professional experience prior to taking monastic vows included architecture, construction and farming, and served them well. In the year 2001 the monastery encountered yet again another fire that destroyed much of the interior of the building. A complete renovation was begun and completed under the direction of Abbot Justin Brown, the current abbot. After the Second Vatican Council in the 1960s the priests and the brothers were consolidated into one building and the brothers separate house was done away with.

After Hurricane Katrina, the abbey gave shelter to more than 150 people. It also provided a home to displaced residents of Notre Dame Seminary while the seminary's Carrollton Avenue site in New Orleans was repaired. The Knights of Columbus host KC Camp Abbey, a summer camp, on the abbey grounds. The abbey temporarily hosted Archbishop Hannan High School.

=== Abbey Church ===
St. Joseph Abbey Church was built in 1929 in the Romanesque style. In 1946 the Abbot of the monastery, Abbot Columbian, commissioned Dom Gregory De Wit, a Benedictine artist, to fill the abbey church, monastery, and monastery refectory with murals. These murals depict saints, stories from the Bible, God's creation, and stories from the life of St. Benedict. De Wit was able to come up with a mixture of paint that would withstand the harsh humidity of South Louisiana.

In the early 2000s the church acquired a Dobson Pipe Organ opus 2000 which was later the cover image of the April 2001 edition of The American Organist magazine Friar Sean Duggan, a monk of St. Joseph Abbey who teaches piano and organ at the State University of New York at Fredonia, is well known for his playing of this organ.

== Monks ==
The monks follow the Rule of Saint Benedict, based on the tradition Ora et labora (pray and work). Even though Seminary education has been the main focus of the monks of St. Joseph Abbey, it has not been the only ministry that the monks have engaged in. St. Joseph Abbey is currently made up of 45 monks, comprising both brothers and ordained priests. They currently have two junior monks, and two novices. The monks of St. Joseph pray the liturgy of the hours four times every day starting at 6:00 a.m. Centering on the Holy Mass at mid-day and ending with compline at 7:15 pm. The monks of St. Joseph Abbey have faithfully provided the area of Southern Louisiana with an intimate immersion in the Rule of St. Benedict, and have instructed countless others in the way of Christian Holiness. The monks currently staff parish churches in the area, and extend hospitality to hundreds of guests every year. They are also involved in candle making, gardening, bee-keeping and painting.

=== Pennies for Bread ===
For over twenty-three years the Abbey's "Pennies for Bread" has been baking about 2000 loaves of bread each week for distribution to organizations that serve the homeless and the poor of New Orleans and the North Shore: orphanages, homes for battered women, and anyone else who needs to feed many hungry people on a nonprofit budget. The program is run on donations and the bread is provided free of charge. Some of these organizations include local food banks, senior centers, the Salvation Army, New Orleans Ministries and Our Lady of Perpetual Help. The bakery was temporarily shut down after the March 2016 flood.

=== St. Joseph Abbey v. Castille ===
After Hurricane Katrina leveled many of the trees in St. Tammany Parish in 2005, the monks revived the ancient monastic practice of casket making. The monks build caskets to sell to the public in order to cover the cost of education and health care services for the monks.

The Louisiana Board of Funeral Directors moved to shut down the monks' fledgling business before it sold even one casket because it was a crime in Louisiana for anyone but a government-licensed funeral director to sell caskets to the public. Writing in the National Review, Veronique De Rugy noted that eight of the nine members of the government board work in the funeral industry.

The Institute of Justice represented the Abbey in challenging the legislation. In "St. Joseph Abbey v. Castille" 712 F.3d 215 (5th Cir. 2013) the 5th U.S. Circuit Court of Appeals ruled in a unanimous landmark decision that "[t]he great deference due state economic regulation does not demand judicial blindness to the history of a challenged rule or the context of its adoption nor does it require courts to accept nonsensical explanations for regulation." The court further stated, "The principle we protect from the hand of the State today protects an equally vital core principle –- the taking of wealth and handing it to others when it comes not as economic protectionism in service of the public good but as 'economic' protection of the rulemakers' pockets." De Rugy observed that the court's striking down the legislation was a victory for consumers.

== Abbots ==
- 1903-1931 Paul Schaeuble
- 1931-1957 Columban Thuis
- 1957-1982 David Melencon
- 1982-2001 Patrick Regan
- 2001-2023 Justin Brown
- 2023-present Gregory Boquet

== Abbey Youth Festival ==
In 2001 under the leadership of Dr. Chris Baglow and the seminarians of Saint Joseph Seminary College the Abbey Youth Fest was initiated, and has evolved into the largest event in the Archdiocese of New Orleans, drawing over 4,500. The Abbey Youth Festival is an apostolic service of Saint Joseph Abbey and Seminary College, designed to provide young people with an opportunity to experience a day of prayer and faith formation with an exposure to the Benedictine tradition. Its focus is evangelization and vocational discernment by means of Liturgy, prayer, worship, music and education appropriate for Catholic young people ages 12 and up.
