= Edward Joseph O'Donnell =

Catholic bishop

His Excellency, The Most Reverend Edward Joseph O'Donnell
- Bishop of Lafayette
- Church: Roman Catholic Church
- See: Diocese of Lafayette
- In office: November 8, 1994 to November 8, 2002
- Predecessor: Harry Joseph Flynn
- Successor: Charles Michael Jarrell
- Other posts: Auxiliary Bishop of Saint Louis; 1982 to 1994

Orders
- Ordination: April 6, 1956 by Joseph Ritter
- Consecration: February 10, 1983 by John L. May

Personal details
- Born: July 4, 1931 St Louis, Missouri, US
- Died: February 1, 2009 (aged 77) Kirkwood, Missouri, US
- Motto: To bind all together

Styles of Edward Joseph O'Donnell
- Reference style: His Excellency; The Most Reverend
- Spoken style: Your Excellency
- Religious style: Bishop

Edward Joseph O'Donnell (July 4, 1931 – February 1, 2009) was an American prelate of the Roman Catholic Church who served as the fifth bishop of the Diocese of Lafayette in Louisiana from 1994 to 2002. He previously served as an auxiliary bishop of the Archdiocese of Saint Louis in Missouri from 1983 to 1994.

O'Donnell built a reputation as a strong supporter of the Civil Rights Movement in the United States during the 1960s.

== Biography ==
=== Early life ===
Edward O'Donnell was born on July 4, 1931, in St, Louis, Missouri. He attended Kenrick Seminary in Shrewsbury, Missouri.

O'Donnell was ordained to the priesthood for the Archdiocese of Saint Louis on April 6, 1956, by Cardinal Joseph Ritter. In 1965, O'Donnell led a contingent from St. Louis to Alabama to participate in the Selma to Montgomery civil rights march.

O'Donnell ran the Radio and Television Apostolate for the archdiocese. He moderated a television programs called “Quiz A Catholic” and appeared on radio in discussions with clergy from other faiths.

=== Auxiliary Bishop of Saint Louis ===
On December 6, 1982, Pope John Paul II appointed O'Donnell as an auxiliary bishop of Saint Louis; he was consecrated at the Cathedral of Saint Louis in St. Louis by Archbishop John Lawrence May on February 10, 1983. O'Donnell also served as vicar general of the archdiocese and edited its newspaper.

In 1993, O'Donnell was appointed as apostolic administrator of the archdiocese while May was fighting brain cancer. He served in this role for 15 months. He founded the Pro-Life Committee for the archdiocese as part of his opposition to abortion rights for women. It was one of the first Catholic groups in the nation to provide support to women who chose not to have abortions.

=== Bishop of Lafayette in Louisiana ===
On November 8, 1994, John Paul II appointed O'Donnell as bishop of Lafayette in Louisiana. He was installed on December 16, 1994. One of O'Donnell's initiatives was to increase the number of African-Americans in diocesan affairs. He also instituted one of the first zero tolerance policies towards child sexual abuse by clergy in the nation.

=== Death ===
On November 8, 2002, John Paul II accepted O'Donnell's resignation as bishop of Lafayette in Louisiana. Edward O'Donnell died from Parkinson's disease on February 1, 2009, at St. Agnes Home in Kirkwood, Missouri, at age 77.

== Notes ==
Catholic Church titles
Preceded by Harry Joseph Flynn	Bishop of Lafayette in Louisiana; 1994–2002	Succeeded by Charles Michael Jarrell
Preceded by –	Auxiliary Bishop of Saint Louis; 1983–1994	Succeeded by –
