= Jules Jeanmard =

American prelate

His Excellency, The Most Reverend Jules Jeanmard
- Bishop of Lafayette in Louisiana titular bishop of Bareta
- See: Diocese of Lafayette in Louisiana
- In office: 1918–1956
- Successor: Maurice Schexnayder

Orders
- Ordination: June 10, 1903 by Placide Louis Chapelle
- Consecration: December 8, 1919 by Giovanni Bonzano

Personal details
- Born: August 15, 1879 Breaux Bridge, Louisiana, US
- Died: February 23, 1957 (aged 77) Lake Charles, Louisiana, US
- Buried: St. John Cathedral
- Denomination: Roman Catholic
- Parents: Jules and Frances Maria (née Brown) Jeanmard
- Education: St. Joseph Seminary; Our Lady of Holy Cross College
- Motto: Sub tuum praesidium (Under Your protection)

Styles of Jules Benjamin Jeanmard
- Reference style: His Excellency; The Most Reverend
- Spoken style: Your Excellency
- Religious style: Bishop

Jules Benjamin Jeanmard (August 15, 1879 – February 23, 1957), was an American prelate of the Catholic Church. He served as the first bishop of Lafayette in Louisiana from 1918 to 1956.

== Biography ==
=== Early life ===
Jules Jeanmard was born on August 15, 1879, in Breaux Bridge, Louisiana, to Jules and Frances Maria (née Brown) Jeanmard. He received his early education at the parochial school of St. Bernard Parish in Breaux Bridge. He then attended St. Joseph Seminary in St Benedict, Louisiana and Our Lady of Holy Cross College in New Orleans, Louisiana. He studied for the priesthood at St. Louis Diocesan Seminary in New Orleans and at Kenrick Seminary in St. Louis, Missouri.

=== Priestly ministry ===
Jeanmard was ordained a priest in New Orleans by Archbishop Placide Louis Chapelle for the Archdiocese of New Orleans on June 10, 1903. His first assignment was as a curate at St. Louis Cathedral, where he served through the yellow fever epidemic of 1905. He served as secretary to Archbishop James Blenk from 1906 to 1914, and chancellor of the archdiocese from 1914 to 1917. He also served as vicar general for spiritual affairs of the archdiocese. Following the death of Archbishop Blenk, he served as apostolic administrator of New Orleans from 1917 to 1918. He then served as apostolic administrator of the newly erected Diocese of Lafayette.

=== Bishop of Lafayette in Louisiana ===
On July 18, 1918, Jeanmard was appointed the first bishop of the new Diocese of Lafayette in Louisiana by Pope Benedict XV. He received his episcopal consecration at the Cathedral of Saint Louis in New Orleans on December 8, 1918, from Archbishop Giovanni Bonzano, with Bishops Theophile Meerschaert and John Laval serving as co-consecrators. He was the first native Louisianan to become a Catholic bishop.

During his 38-year tenure, Jeanmard established the Immaculata Seminary and St. Mary's Orphan Home in Lafayette, Louisiana. He also opened the Our Lady of the Oaks Retreat House in Grand Coteau, Louisiana and the Catholic Student Center at the University of Southwestern Louisiana in Lafayette. Jeanmard's other projects included a retreat wing of the Most Holy Sacrament Convent, a Carmelite monastery, and numerous schools and churches. He encouraged diocesan-sponsored television programs, religious radio programs in both English and French, and a diocesan newspaper The Southwest Louisiana Register. Jeanmard also issued pastoral letters in support of the rights of labor to organize. In 1943, he was named an assistant at the pontifical throne by Pope Pius XII.

In March 1923, when the citizens of Lafayette were on the verge of rioting following a public reading of members of the Ku Klux Klan, Jeanmard defused the situation, urging people to return to their homes. In 1934, he welcomed the first African-American priests into the diocese, a group of men educated and ordained at St. Augustine Seminary in Bay St. Louis, Mississippi. Jeanmard also established a number of separate parishes for African-Americans, whom he did not want intimidated or infringed upon by whites.

With financial assistance from Mother Katharine Drexel, Jeanmard helped establish several rural parochial schools for African-Americans. In 1952, he ordained Louis Ledoux, an African-American graduate of St. Augustine's. Jeanmard became the first bishop in the Deep South of the United States to ordain an African-American as a priest. In November 1955, Jeanmard excommunicated two women in Erath, Louisiana, after they beat another woman who taught an integrated catechism class.

=== Retirement and legacy ===
On March 13, 1956, Jeanmard retired as bishop of Lafayette in Louisiana; he was appointed titular bishop of Bareta by Pope Pius XII on the same date. Jeanmard died on February 23, 1957, at a hospital in Lake Charles, at age 77. He is interred at St. John Cathedral in Lafayette.

== Notes ==
Catholic Church titles
Preceded by none	Bishop of Lafayette in Louisiana; 1918–1956	Succeeded by Maurice Schexnayder
