= Ray Mouton =

American lawyer (1947–2026)

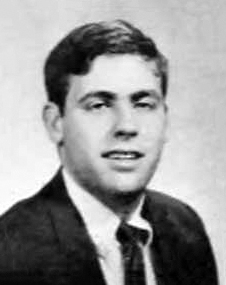
- Mouton in 1968
- Born: Francis Ray Mouton Jr. April 1, 1947; Lafayette, Louisiana, U.S.
- Died: February 5, 2026 (aged 78); Jefferson, Louisiana, U.S.
- Education: University of Louisiana at Lafayette (BA); Louisiana State University (JD)
- Occupations: Lawyer, author
- Known for: Defense of Gilbert Gauthe; Co-authoring report on Catholic Church sexual abuse cases

Francis Ray Mouton Jr. (April 1, 1947 – February 5, 2026) was an American lawyer. He was known for his 1984 legal defense of Father Gilbert Gauthe, a Roman Catholic priest who was convicted of molesting 37 children, in the first widely publicized trial for child sexual abuse in the church. He subsequently co-authored a report detailing a great deal more abuse by clergy, warning the church that they stood to lose a billion dollars. The church ignored the report, which catalyzed a moral crisis for Mouton in which he got divorced, became an alcoholic, and moved to Europe. He published a novel about abuse in the church and a guidebook to Pamplona.

== Life and career ==
Francis Ray Mouton Jr. was the second child of five born to Francis Ray Sr. and Marjorie Mouton (née Breedlove). He was born in Lafayette, Louisiana, on April 1, 1947. His family built Our Lady of Fatima, described by The New York Times as "one of the grandest churches in Lafayette."

In 1969 he received a bachelor's degree in business from the University of Louisiana at Lafayette, and in 1973 earned a Juris Doctor degree from Louisiana State University.

While in college he married Janis Thiberville. The couple settled in Lafayette Parish, where Mouton worked as a personal injury and criminal defense lawyer.

In 1984 he was hired by the Diocese of Lafayette to defend Roman Catholic priest Father Gilbert Gauthe, who was charged with 37 counts of child abuse, in what The Guardian describes as the first legally recorded case of its kind. Mouton has said that at the time, he did not believe that abuse could be an endemic problem in the church, thinking that Gauthe was a "sole, aberrant individual." In 2002 he told The Washington Post that his reasons for taking the case were "vanity and money". Mouton received death threats for this work on the case. After pleading guilty, Gauthe was sentenced to 20 years' imprisonment. The family of the victim received $1.2m in damages.

During his defense of Gauthe, Mouton learned that the church had known about his crimes since his time in seminary and had moved him from parish to parish as a result. Mouton had also seen evidence that convinced him of wider abuse in the church and set out to document what he knew. The result was a 92-page document, which became known as The Manual, co-authored with Father Tom Doyle, a canon lawyer at the Vatican embassy in Washington, D.C., and Father Michael Peterson, a psychiatrist and priest. The New York Times said in Mouton's obituary that the report was focused primarily on protecting the church's reputation and finances as opposed to helping its victims, suggesting that the cases could cost as much as $1 billion in damages.

The report was ignored by the church. Mouton said that the process of battling the diocese had "burned [him] up spiritually, mentally, and physically." He closed his legal practice, separated from and later divorced his wife, and became an alcoholic. In Lead Us Not into Temptation: Catholic Priests and the Sexual Abuse of Children, Jason Berry wrote that Mouton became "a man in a profound moral crisis," who was "the voice in the wilderness trying to raise the consciousness of these bishops at a time when most of them were in abject denial."

Mouton then spent a decade traveling in Europe, settling in Saint-Jean-Pied-de-Port, France, close to the border with Spain. He married Melony Barrios in 2000, and in 2002 published a book, Pamplona: Running the Bulls, Bars and Barrios in Fiesta de San Fermin. Mouton published a novel in 2012, In God's House, which told a fictionalized version of his experiences with the church.

Mouton died from lung and throat cancer aged 78 in Jefferson, Louisiana, on February 5, 2026.
