= Oscar Barbarin =

American psychologist and academic

Oscar Anthony Barbarin
- Occupations: Clinical psychologist and academic
- Awards: Distinguished Contributions to Understanding International, Cultural, and Contextual Diversity, Society for Research in Child Development (2015)

Academic background
- Education: A.B., Philosophy; M.A., Counseling Psychology; M.S., Psychology; Ph.D., Clinical Psychology
- Alma mater: Saint Joseph Seminary College; New York University; Rutgers University

Oscar Anthony Barbarin is a clinical psychologist and academic whose research explores the effects of race and adversity on child development. His work focuses particularly on the development of Black boys and youth, identifying key risk and protective factors that influence their emotional, academic, and social well-being.

Barbarin received the 2015 Distinguished Contributions to Understanding International, Cultural, and Contextual Diversity in Child Development Award from the Society for Research in Child Development. He is also a fellow of the American Psychological Association.

== Education ==
Barbarin earned his Bachelor of Arts in Philosophy and received training in Theology at Saint Joseph Seminary College. He went on to complete a Master of Arts in Counseling at New York University, followed by a Master of Science in Psychology and a Ph.D. in Clinical Psychology from Rutgers University.

== Career ==
Barbarin began his academic career as an assistant professor in the Clinical Psychology program at the University of Maryland from 1974 to 1979. He then served in the Department of Psychology and the School of Social Work, where he advanced from assistant professor to professor between 1979 and 2000. From 2000 to 2009, he held the L. Richardson and Emily Preyer Distinguished Professorship at the University of North Carolina School of Social Work and was a fellow at the Frank Porter Graham Child Development Center.

Barbarin served as chair of the U.S. National Committee for Psychology at the National Academies of Sciences, Engineering, and Medicine in 2010 and was elected to the Executive Committee of the International Union of Psychological Science in 2012. He then held the Lila L. and Douglas J. Hertz Endowed Chair in the Department of Psychology at Tulane University from 2009 to 2015. From 2015 to 2020, he was a professor of African American Studies and Psychology at the University of Maryland.

At the University of Michigan, Barbarin served as director of the Family Development Project from 1979 to 2000, director of the University Center for the Child and Family within the Institute for Human Adjustment from 1992 to 1994, co-director of the Detroit Initiative in Psychology from 1995 to 2000, and executive director of the South African Initiative in the Office of the Provost and Vice President for Research from 1996 to 2000. He also served on the board of directors of the American Orthopsychiatric Association between 1988 and 1991 and again from 2000 to 2004, during which he was president from 2001 to 2003. At the University of Maryland, he chaired the Department of African American Studies from 2015 to 2020.

== Awards and honors ==
- 1984 – Special Commendation Award, U.S. Government Accounting Office
- 1990 – Fellow, American Psychological Association
- 1991 – Special Service Award, American Orthopsychiatric Association
- 2015 – Distinguished Contributions to Understanding International, Cultural and Contextual Diversity in Child Development Award, Society for Research in Child Development

== Bibliography ==
- Chesler, Mark; Barbarin, Oscar (1987). Childhood Cancer and the Family: Meeting the Challenge of Stress and Support. Bruner/Mazel. ISBN 9780876304419.
- Barbarin, Oscar; Richter, Linda (2001). Mandela's Children: Growing Up in Post-Apartheid South Africa (1st ed.). Routledge. ISBN 9780415924696.
