= Archbishop Hannan High School =

Location
- 71324 Highway 1077; Covington, Louisiana 70433; United States; 30°28′1″N 90°10′56″W

Information
- School type: Private, coeducational College preparatory high school
- Motto: Caritas Viniculum Perfectionis. (Charity leads to perfection.)
- Religious affiliation: Christian
- Denomination: Roman Catholic
- Founded: 1987
- Founder: John Serio
- Status: operating
- School district: Roman Catholic Archdiocese of New Orleans
- Chaplain: David Doyle
- Grades: 8–12
- Average class size: 21
- Classes offered: College Preparatory Courses; Advanced Placement Courses; Dual Enrollment Courses
- Colors: Crimson and navy
- Sports: Football; Cross Country; Volleyball; Basketball; Powerlifting; Soccer; Track & Field; Softball; Baseball; Swimming; Tennis; Bowling; Wrestling; Golf
- Mascot: Harry the Hawk
- Nickname: Hannan Hawks
- Team name: Hawks
- Rival: Saint Thomas Aquinas High School; Northlake Christian School; Pope John Paul School
- Accreditation: Southern Association of Colleges and Schools
- Tuition: $11,355 (2025-2026)
- Website: www.hannanhigh.org

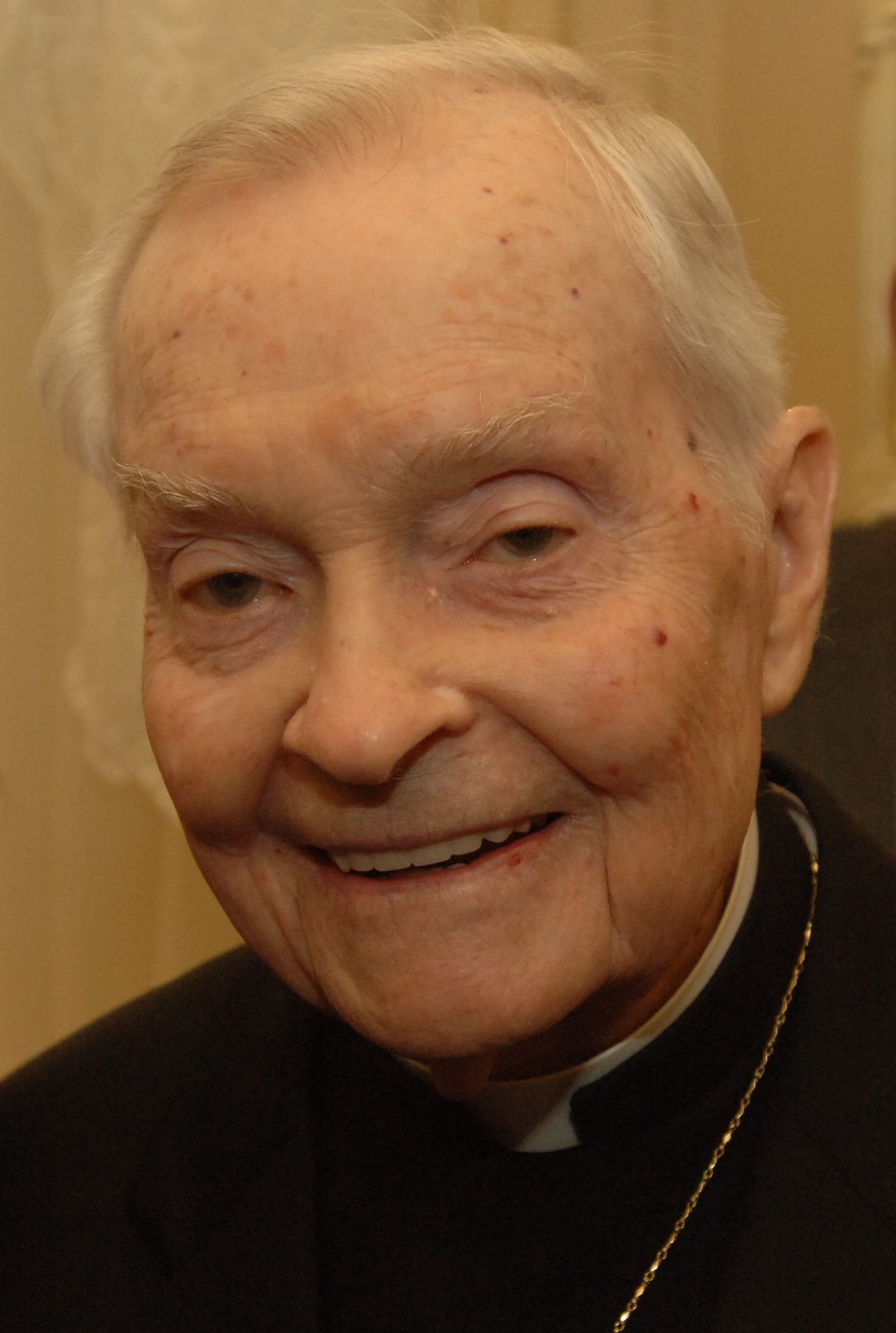
Archbishop Philip Hannan

Archbishop Hannan High School is a Catholic, co-ed, high school located in St. Tammany Parish, Louisiana, United States. Its mascot is called Harry The Hawk. The school's motto is Caritas Viniculum Perfectionis, which translates to "charity leads to perfection." It is located in the Roman Catholic Archdiocese of New Orleans.

The school is in an unincorporated area, and has a Covington postal address.

The school is named for the late Philip M. Hannan, Archbishop of New Orleans from 1965 to 1989.

== The Old Campus (St. Bernard Parish Campus) ==
The old Hannan campus, located at 2501 Archbishop Philip M. Hannan Boulevard in Meraux, was destroyed by Hurricane Katrina in 2005. The campus was situated on Archbishop Philip M. Hannan Boulevard, between East Judge Perez Drive and St. Bernard Highway. The school was completely air-conditioned and included Our Lady of Peace Chapel, separate boys' and girls' athletic facilities (including a baseball stadium, softball field, and lighted football stadium), a large library and media center, a science wing, networked computer laboratories, a state-of-the-art foreign language lab, and a Fine Arts Complex that included a 200-seat auditorium, band room, art studio, and journalism lab.

Before its destruction the old campus was in its seventeenth year in operation as the only Catholic high school in St. Bernard Parish.

After Hurricane Katrina, Saint Joseph Abbey temporarily housed the school from August 2006-October 2008 until the current campus on Hwy 1077 was built.

== Athletics ==
Archbishop Hannan athletics competes in the LHSAA.

The first permanent post-Katrina American football field for the school opened in 2013. Prior to that point, the American football team traveled between practice sites.

Hannan sports teams:

- Football
- Volleyball
- Boys Basketball
- Girls Basketball
- Track & Field
- Cross Country
- Baseball
- Softball
- Bowling
- Golf
- Tennis
- Girls Soccer
- Boys Soccer
- Powerlifting
- Wrestling
- Swimming

=== Championships ===
- Bowling State Championship: 2005 (undefeated state champions in 2005, the first year bowling was considered a state sport)
- Softball State Championship: 2011, 2012, 2019, 2021, 2022
- Volleyball State Championship: 2018, 2020, 2021, 2023, 2026
- Boys Basketball State Championship: 2022, 2025

== Notable alumni ==
- Tommy Manzella, former MLB player (Houston Astros)
