= Gilbert Gauthe =

American Catholic priest convicted of sexual abuse of children

Gilbert Gauthe is an American former Catholic priest who served in the Diocese of Lafayette in Louisiana from 1972 to 1983. In 1984, Gauthe became the first Catholic priest in the United States to face a widely publicized criminal trial for child sexual abuse.

In 1974, Bishop Frey assigned Gauthe as a Boy Scout chaplain, even though Frey had heard allegations of Gauthe molesting altar boys. In 1976, the diocese sent him away for therapy for seven months. By 1983, the diocese was receiving allegations of sexual misconduct by Gauthe from parishioners.

In October 1984, Gauthe was charged with multiple counts of aggravated crimes against nature, committing sexually immoral acts with minors, aggravated rape (sodomizing a boy under the age of 12) and crimes of pornography involving juveniles, through pornographic photo sessions. A plea of not guilty by reason of insanity was submitted on his behalf by defense lawyer Ray Mouton. In October 1985, Gauthe accepted a plea bargain, pleading guilty to child pornography, crime against nature, and contributing to the delinquency of a minor. He was sentenced to 20 years in prison.

The diocese had settled nine lawsuits by sexual abuse victims for $4.2 million by 1985. The diocese settled with the victims for more than $20 million in lawsuits involving Gauthe. Gauthe admitted to sexually abusing 37 children and accepted a plea bargain in which he was sentenced to 20 years in prison. He was released in 1995 after serving 10 years of his sentence, then moved to Texas, where he was later charged with sexually abusing a 3-year-old boy. He was sentenced to probation in 1997 after pleading guilty to abusing the child. Gauthe was later jailed in Galveston County between 2008 and 2010 for violating the Texas sex offender registry requirements.

Gauthe's crimes were the basis for the 1990 HBO TV film Judgment.
