= Saint Joseph Seminary College =

Catholic seminary in Saint Benedict, Louisiana

- Type: Seminary
- Established: 1891
- Religious affiliation: Roman Catholic
- Chancellor: Gregory M. Aymond
- Rector: Matthew Clark
- Faculty: 20
- Students: 103
- Location: Covington, Louisiana, United States; 30.5267°N 90.1115°W
- Campus: Rural
- Colors: White, navy blue
- Nickname: St. Ben's
- Mascot: The Ravens
- Website: sjasc.edu

Saint Joseph Seminary College (also known as St. Ben or St. Ben's) is a Catholic seminary in Saint Benedict, Louisiana, United States. Founded in 1891, it is operated by the Benedictine monks of Saint Joseph Abbey and the dioceses in the ecclesiastical provinces of New Orleans and Mobile.

== Academics ==
The college is accredited by the Southern Association of Colleges and Schools and offers Bachelor of Arts degrees in either philosophy and the liberal arts or philosophy and theological studies to men seeking eventual ordination as priests in the Roman Catholic Church. The college also has a two-year pre-theology program for students who have already attained a college degree. After attending Saint Joseph Seminary College, seminarians wishing to continue priestly studies will attend a graduate seminary. In the past, Saint Joseph Seminary College has also offered degrees with majors in psychology, history, and English.

== Bonfire football game ==
There is also the tradition of a flag football game, called Bonfire, between St. Ben's and the graduate seminary of New Orleans, Notre Dame. This tradition has gone on for well over 70 years. The annual game takes place in a field on the vast property of the Abbey the Friday before Thanksgiving. The students at St. Ben's spend weeks building a massive bonfire out of the downed trees on the surrounding forests owned by the Abbey. After the game, the two seminaries join to share in fellowship and traditional Louisiana foods around the bonfire.

== Notable alumni ==
- Jules Jeanmard, first bishop of the Diocese of Lafayette, Louisiana
- Bernard Francis Law, cardinal and archbishop emeritus of the Archdiocese of Boston, Massachusetts
- John Clement Favalora, archbishop emeritus of the Archdiocese of Miami, Florida
- Joseph Nunzio Latino, bishop emeritus of the Diocese of Jackson, Mississippi
- Ronald Paul Herzog, current bishop of the Diocese of Alexandria, Louisiana
- Robert William Muench, bishop emeritus of the Diocese of Baton Rouge, Louisiana
- Glen John Provost, current bishop of the Diocese of Lake Charles, Louisiana
- Gregory Michael Aymond, archbishop of the Archdiocese of New Orleans, Louisiana
- Shelton Joseph Fabre, current archbishop of the Archdiocese of Louisville in Kentucky
- Ryan Stawaisz, priest of the Archdiocese of Galveston-Houston
- Oscar A. Barbarin, clinical psychologist and academic
