= Maurice Schexnayder =

American prelate

His Excellency, The Most Reverend Maurice Schexnayder
- Bishop of Lafayette in Louisiana; Titular Bishop of Tuscamia
- See: Diocese of Lafayette in Louisiana
- In office: 1956–1972
- Predecessor: Jules Jeanmard
- Successor: Gerard Louis Frey

Orders
- Ordination: April 12, 1925
- Consecration: February 22, 1951 by Amleto Giovanni Cicognani

Personal details
- Born: August 13, 1895 Wallace, Louisiana, USA
- Died: January 23, 1981 (aged 85) Lafayette, Louisiana, US
- Buried: Cathedral of Saint John the Evangelist in Lafayette, Louisiana
- Denomination: Roman Catholicism
- Parents: Adam and Jeanne Marie (née Dupleix) Schexnayder
- Education: St. Joseph College Seminary; St. Mary Seminary; Pontifical North American College
- Motto: Ad te clamamus (We cry out to You)

Styles of Maurice Schexnayder
- Reference style: His Excellency; The Most Reverend
- Spoken style: Your Excellency
- Religious style: Bishop

Maurice Schexnayder (August 13, 1895 – January 23, 1981) was an American prelate of the Roman Catholic Church. He served as bishop of the Diocese of Lafayette in Louisiana from 1956 to 1972.

== Biography ==
=== Early life ===
Maurice Schexnayder was born on August 13, 1895, in Wallace, Louisiana, to Adam and Jeanne Marie (née Dutreix) Schexnayder. After attending schools in Wallace and New Orleans, Louisiana, he entered St. Joseph College Seminary near Covington, Louisiana in 1916. He then attended St. Mary Seminary in Baltimore, Maryland, before furthering his studies at the Pontifical North American College in Rome.

=== Priesthood ===
Schexnayder was ordained to the priesthood for the Archdiocese of New Orleans in Rome by Archbishop Giuseppe Palica on April 12, 1925. Following his return to Louisiana, the archdiocese assigned him as a curate at St. John the Evangelist Parish in Plaquemine. In 1929, he was appointed chaplain of the Newman Club at Louisiana State University in Baton Rouge, Louisiana. Schexnayder also served as state chaplain of the Knights of Columbus (1932–1944) and pastor of St. Francis de Sales Parish in Houma, Louisiana (1946–1950). The Vatican named Schexnayder as domestic prelate in 1947.

=== Auxiliary Bishop and Bishop of Lafayette in Louisiana ===
On December 11, 1950, Schexnayder was appointed auxiliary bishop of Lafayette in Louisiana and titular bishop of Tuscamia by Pope Pius XII. He received his episcopal consecration on February 22, 1951, from Archbishop Amleto Cicognani, with Bishops Jules Jeanmard and Louis Caillouet serving as co-consecrators. In addition to his episcopal duties, he served as pastor of St. Michael Parish in Crowley, Louisiana.

Upon the resignation of Jeanmard, Schexnayder was named the second bishop of Lafayette in Louisiana by Pius XII on March 13, 1956. During his tenure, he built a new chancery building, expanded Immaculata Minor Seminary, established thirty-one parishes, and ordained eighty-one priests. In 1961, he established St. Eugene Catholic Parish in Grand Chenier in Cameron Parish. Schexnayder attended all four sessions of the Second Vatican Council in Rome between 1962 and 1965.

=== Retirement and legacy ===
On November 7, 1972, Pope Paul VI accepted Schexnayder's resignation as bishop of Lafayette in Louisiana. Maurice Schexnayder died in Lafayette on January 23, 1981, at age 85. He is buried at the Cathedral of Saint John the Evangelist in Lafayette.

In 2014, documents were released that criticized Schexnayder for protecting priests accused of sexually abusing children. In a lawsuit, the diocese's insurance company "argued that the diocese knew for years, if not decades, that some of their priests had fondled and even raped children" and that "the molestations took place largely during the reigns of Bishops Maurice Schexnayder" and his successor, Bishop Gerard Louis Frey.

Catholic Church titles
Preceded by Jules Jeanmard	Bishop of Lafayette in Louisiana; 1956–1972	Succeeded by Gerard Louis Frey
