= Diocese of Lafayette in Louisiana =

Latin Catholic jurisdiction in the U.S.

Coordinates: 30°12′50″N 92°01′46″W

Diocese of Lafayette Dioecesis Lafayettensis Diocèse de Lafayette
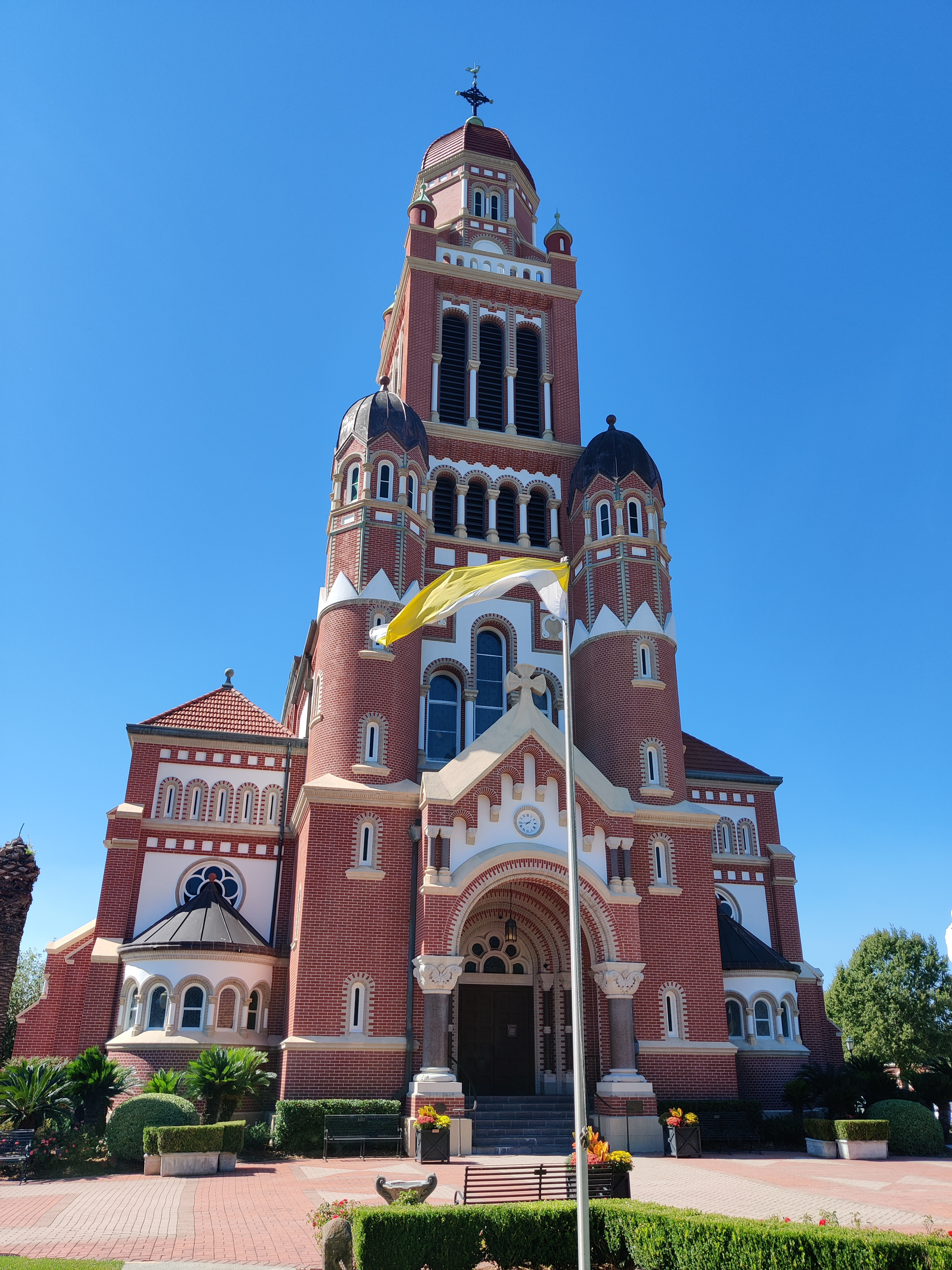
- Cathedral of St. John the Evangelist

- Coat of arms

Location
- Country: United States
- Territory: Civil parishes of St. Landry, Evangeline, Lafayette, St. Martin, Iberia, St. Mary, Acadia and Vermilion
- Ecclesiastical province: Archdiocese of New Orleans

Statistics
- Area: 5,779 sq mi (14,970 km^{2})
- Population: Total; Catholics: (as of 2013); 629,000; 330,000 (52.5%)
- Parishes: 121

Information
- Denomination: Catholic Church
- Sui iuris church: Latin Church
- Rite: Roman Rite
- Established: January 11, 1918
- Cathedral: Cathedral of Saint John the Evangelist
- Patron saint: Immaculate Conception (Primary); St. John Vianney (Secondary)
- Secular priests: 190

Current leadership
- Pope: Leo XIV
- Bishop: J. Douglas Deshotel
- Metropolitan Archbishop: James F. Checchio
- Bishops emeritus: Charles Michael Jarrell

Map
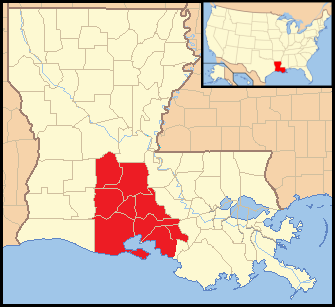

Website
- diolaf.org

The Diocese of Lafayette in Louisiana (Latin: Dioecesis Lafayettensis, French: Diocèse de Lafayette en Louisiane) is a diocese of the Catholic Church in the United States. It is a suffragan diocese of the Roman Catholic Archdiocese of New Orleans.

The diocese was erected by the Vatican in 1918, and its current bishop is J. Douglas Deshotel. It covers St. Landry, Evangeline, Lafayette, St. Martin, Iberia, St. Mary, Acadia, and Vermilion parishes with the exception to Morgan City of the Diocese of Houma-Thibodaux).

== History ==
=== 1700 to 1800 ===
During the mid-1700s, when present-day Lafayette was part of the French colony of Lower Louisiana, Catholic settlers from Spain, France, and Germany started arriving in the Lafayette area. Starting in 1755, they were joined by numerous French Acadians whom the British had expelled from their homes in present-day Nova Scotia.

In 1756, Pierre Didier, a Benedictine priest from the French fort at Pointe Coupée, was the first priest to visit the area. He married a couple and baptized several enslaved people. With the end of the Seven Years War in 1763, France gave up all its colonies in North America. Spain took control of Lower Louisiana and a vast area of the middle of North America.

The first parish in the region was the Church of New Acadia at Attakapas, founded by Acadians in 1765. It later became St. Martin de Tours Parish. In 1776, St. Landry Church was established by French Capuchin priests in Opelousas.The Vatican in 1793 established the Diocese of Louisiana and the Floridas, covering a large sections of land in the American South.

=== 1800 to 1900 ===
France in 1800 regained control of the colonies it surrendered to Spain in 1763 with the signing of the Third Treaty of San Ildefonso. However, three years later, the French Emperor Napoleon Bonaparte sold these colonies to the United States in the Louisiana Purchase. Louisiana was now part of the United States.

Jesuit missionaries in 1819 established the St. Charles Borromeo Parish in Grand Coteau.In 1821, Saint Jean du Vermilion Parish was erected in Vermilionville, which is today Lafayette. This parish was the predecessor for the Cathedral of Saint John the Evangelist.

In 1825, the Vatican renamed the Diocese of Louisiana and the Floridas as the Diocese of New Orleans. The Lafayette area would be part of the Diocese of New Orleans, succeeded by the Archdiocese of New Orleans, for the next 93 years.

=== 1900 to 1950 ===
Pope Benedict XV erected the Roman Catholic Diocese of Lafayette in Louisiana on January 11, 1918, with territory taken from the Archdiocese of New Orleans. The pope named Monsignor Jules Jeanmard of New Orleans as the first bishop of the new diocese. Jeanmard designated Saint John's Church in Lafayette as the cathedral.

In March 1923, a crowd in Lafayette was on the verge of starting a race riot after being incited by the Ku Klux Klan. Jeanmard persuaded the people to return home. In 1924, Jeanmard opened St. Mary's Orphanage in Lafayette. That same year, he requested that the Sisters of the Most Holy Sacrament move their motherhouse from New Orleans to Lafayette. He assisted them in building the retreat wing of their convent.

Jeanmard assisted the Newman Club of Southwestern Louisiana Industrial Institute in Lafayette with buying land and building a clubhouse at the institute in 1929.

In 1934, Jeanmard welcomed the first African-American priests into the diocese. The bishop established a number of separate parishes for African-Americans. With funding from Sister Katharine Drexel, Jeanmard helped establish several rural schools for African-Americans in the diocese.

The Discalced Carmelites moved into the Monastery of Mary, Mother of Grace, their new convent in Lafayette, in 1936. In 1938, Jeanmard opened the Our Lady of the Oaks Retreat House in Grand Coteau. In 1948, Jeanmard established the Immaculata Minor Seminary in Lafayette, a high school/college program for teenage boys entering the priesthood.

=== 1950 to 1990 ===
In 1952, Jeanmard became the first bishop in the Deep South to ordain an African-American man to diocesan priesthood when he conferred holy orders upon Louis Ledoux. In November 1955, Jeanmard excommunicated two women from Erath, Louisiana, after they assaulted a woman who taught an integrated catechism class.

Jeanmard encouraged diocesan-sponsored television programs, religious radio programs in both English and French, and a diocesan newspaper, The Southwest Louisiana Register. Jeanmard also issued pastoral letters in support of the rights of labor to organize.

After Jeanmard retired in 1956, Pope Pius XII named Auxiliary Bishop Maurice Schexnayder as the next bishop of Lafayette in Louisiana. During his tenure, Schexnayder oversaw construction of a new chancery building, expanded the Immaculata Minor Seminary, established 31 parishes and ordained 81 priests.Eager to increase lay participation in the parishes, Schexnayder established parish councils, school boards and other advisory panels staffed by lay people. He retired in 1972.

In 1972, Pope Paul VI named Gerard Frey of New Orleans as the third bishop of Lafayette in Louisiana. In 1980, Pope John Paul II erected the Diocese of Lake Charles, assigning the western half of the Diocese of Lafayette in Louisiana to the new diocese. John Paul II appointed Harry Flynn from the Diocese of Albany as coadjutor bishop in 1989 to assist Frey. When Frey retired later that year, Flynn succeeded him.

=== 1990 to the early 21st century ===
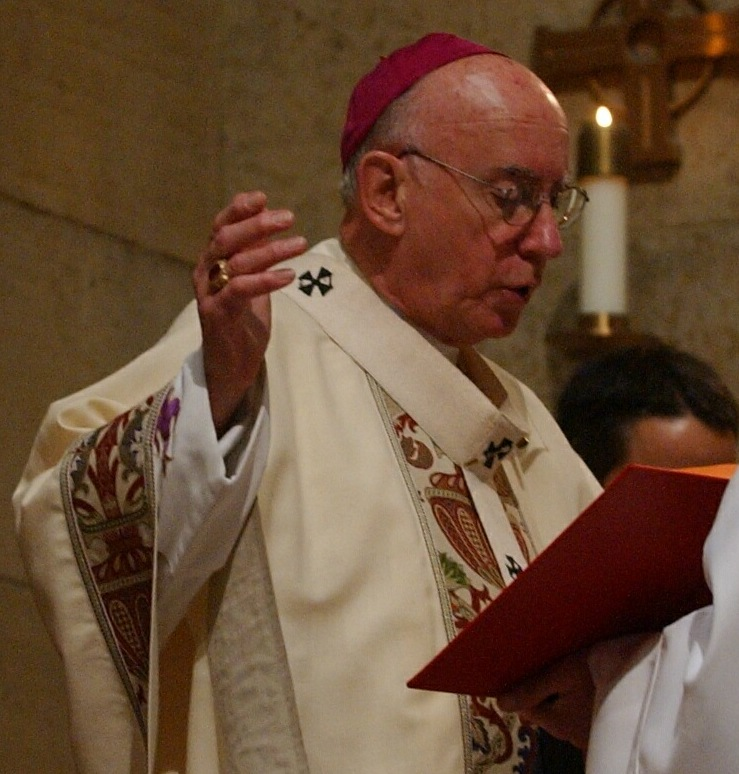
Archbishop Flynn (2009)

Flynn served in Lafayette in Louisiana until 1994, when John Paul II named him archbishop of the Archdiocese of Saint Paul and Minneapolis. To replace Flynn, the pope appointed Auxiliary Bishop Edward O'Donnell from the Archdiocese of St. Louis. One of O'Donnell's initiatives was to increase the number of African-Americans in diocesan affairs. He also instituted one of the first zero-tolerance policies towards child sexual abuse by clergy in the nation. O'Donnell retired in 2002.

In 2002, John Paul II appointed Charles Jarrell as bishop of Lafayette in Louisiana. Jarrell retired in 2016. In November 2019, parishes throughout the diocese raised $50,000 to assist the congregations of three African-American Baptist churches that had destroyed by arson. In May 2024, parishioners averted a potential mass shooting of children at St. Mary Magdalen Catholic Church in Abbeville when they stopped an armed 16-year-old boy from entering the church.

As of 2024, the bishop of Lafayette in Louisiana is J. Douglas Deshotel, formerly an auxiliary bishop of the Diocese of Dallas. He was appointed by Pope Francis in 2016.

==== Sex abuse controversies ====
In 1980, the diocese suspended the priest Gilbert Gauthe from his pastoral position. As early as 1972, three priests had confronted Gauthe about his misconduct with boys.

In 1983, the diocese received a complaint from a family that Robert Fontenot, a diocesan priest, had sexually abused their child. He had been transferred out of other parishes due to complaints by priests that he was molesting children. The diocese sent Fontenot to the House of Affirmation, a Catholic treatment center for pedophile priests in Whitinsville, Massachusetts. The diocese reportedly paid $1 million in compensation to several of his victims. In 1986, Fortenot was arrested in Spokane, Washington, on charges of molesting boys at a drug treatment center. He was convicted and sentenced to one year in prison. In 2008, the diocese reached a settlement with a former altar boy who said the priest Valerie Pullman had sexually abused him in 1972. Pullman had been accused of abuse as early as 1966.

In 2014, Minnesota Public Radio obtained documents from a 1988 lawsuit filed by the diocese against its insurers over sexual abuse claims. The insurers accused the diocese of protecting priests accused of sexually abusing children. The companies "argued that the diocese knew for years, if not decades, that some of their priests had fondled and even raped children" and that "the molestations took place largely during the reigns of Bishops Maurice Schexnayder and his successor, Bishop Frey".

In 2015, it was revealed that ten years previously, the diocese had paid a $26 million settlement to the families of 123 children who were sexually abused by diocesan priests between 1959 and 2002. The Daily Advertiser urged the release of the priests' names, but Bishop Jarrell refused.

In October 2018, David Broussard received a five-year prison sentence after pleading guilty to possession of child pornography. Louisiana State Police had found 500 images of child pornography on the priest's computer in the rectory at St. Bernard Parish in Breaux Bridge.

In March 2019, Michael Guidry confessed to molesting Oliver Peyton, a 16-year-old boy at his residence in St. Landry Parish. Oliver was the son of Scott Peyton, a deacon. In April 2019, Guidry pleaded guilty and received a seven-year prison sentence. In March 2024, Bishop Deshotel excommunicated Scott Peyton after he announced that the family was leaving the Catholic Church.

In April 2019, the diocese released a list of 33 diocesan clergy who were credibly accused of committing acts of sex abuse.

The Louisiana Supreme Court said in June 2024 that it would allow a "look back" period in which victims of sexual abuse could sue their perpetrators, despite the statute of limitations. Soon after, the diocese was named in six new sexual abuse lawsuits.

== Coat of arms ==
Coat of arms of Diocese of Lafayette in Louisiana
Escutcheon Gules, a cross or and a bordure fair. Symbolism The arms are a modified version of the arms of the House of La Fayette.

== Bishops of Lafayette in Louisiana ==
=== Diocesan bishops ===
1. Jules Jeanmard (1918-1956)
2. Maurice Schexnayder (1956-1972)
3. Gerard Louis Frey (1972-1989)
4. Harry Joseph Flynn (1989-1994), appointed Coadjutor Archbishop of Saint Paul and Minneapolis and subsequently succeeded as archbishop
5. Edward Joseph O'Donnell (1994-2002)
6. Charles Michael Jarrell (2002-2016)
7. J. Douglas Deshotel (2016–present)

=== Former auxiliary bishops ===
- Maurice Schexnayder (1951-1956), appointed bishop in Lafayette
- Robert Emmet Tracy (1959-1961), appointed Bishop of Baton Rouge
- Warren Louis Boudreaux (1962-1971), appointed Bishop of Beaumont, later Bishop of Houma-Thibodaux

=== Other diocesan priests who became bishops ===
- Jude Speyrer, appointed Bishop of Lake Charles in 1980
- Sam Joseph Galip Jacobs (priest in Lafayette, 1964–1980), appointed Bishop of Alexandria in 1989
- Glen Provost, appointed Bishop of Lake Charles in 2007

== High schools ==
- Academy of the Sacred Heart – Grand Coteau
- Catholic High School – New Iberia
- Hanson Memorial High School – Franklin
- Notre Dame High School – Crowley
- Opelousas Catholic School – Opelousas
- Sacred Heart School – Ville Platte
- St. Edmund Catholic School – Eunice
- St. Thomas More High Catholic High School – Lafayette
- Teurlings Catholic High School – Lafayette
- Vermilion Catholic – Abbeville

== Ecclesiastical province of New Orleans ==
See: List of the Catholic bishops of the United States#Province of New Orleans
