= St. John's Cathedral (Lafayette, Louisiana) =

Historic church in Louisiana, United States

Cathedral of St. John the Evangelist
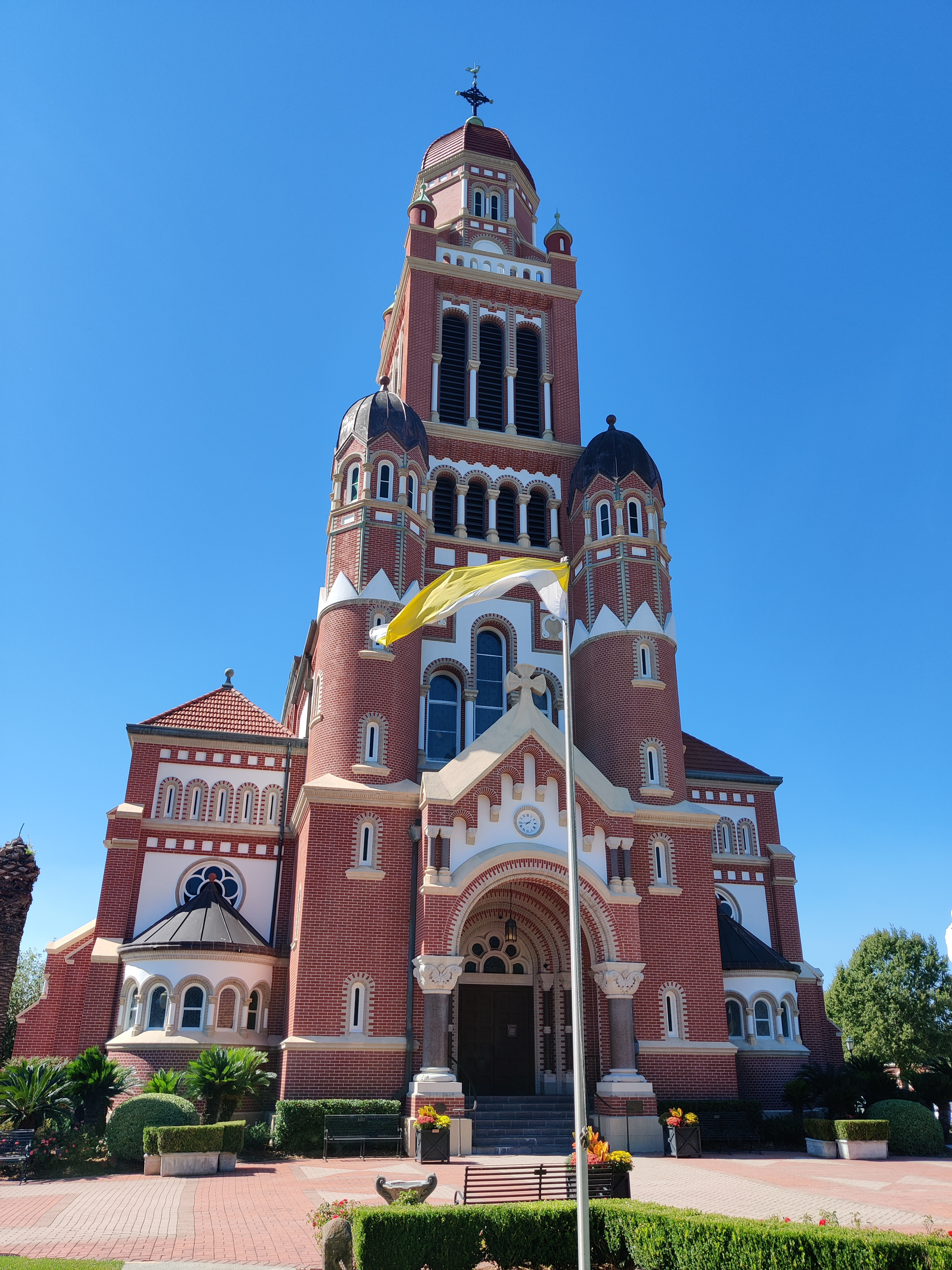
- Front façade
- Cathedral of St. John the Evangelist
- Location: 515 Cathedral Street; Lafayette, Louisiana
- Country: United States
- Denomination: Roman Catholic
- Website: www.saintjohncathedral.org

History
- Status: Cathedral
- Dedicated: June 27, 1916

Architecture
- Functional status: Active
- Style: Romanesque Revival

Administration
- Province: New Orleans
- Diocese: Lafayette (Louisiana)

Clergy
- Bishop: J. Douglas Deshotel
- Rector: Very Rev. Chester C. Arceneaux, V.F.
- Priest(s): Rev. David Furka (Parochial Vicar), Rev. Cyprian Eze (In Residence) Dcn. George Jourdan, Dcn. Kyle Polozola
- St. John's Cathedral
- U.S. National Register of Historic Places
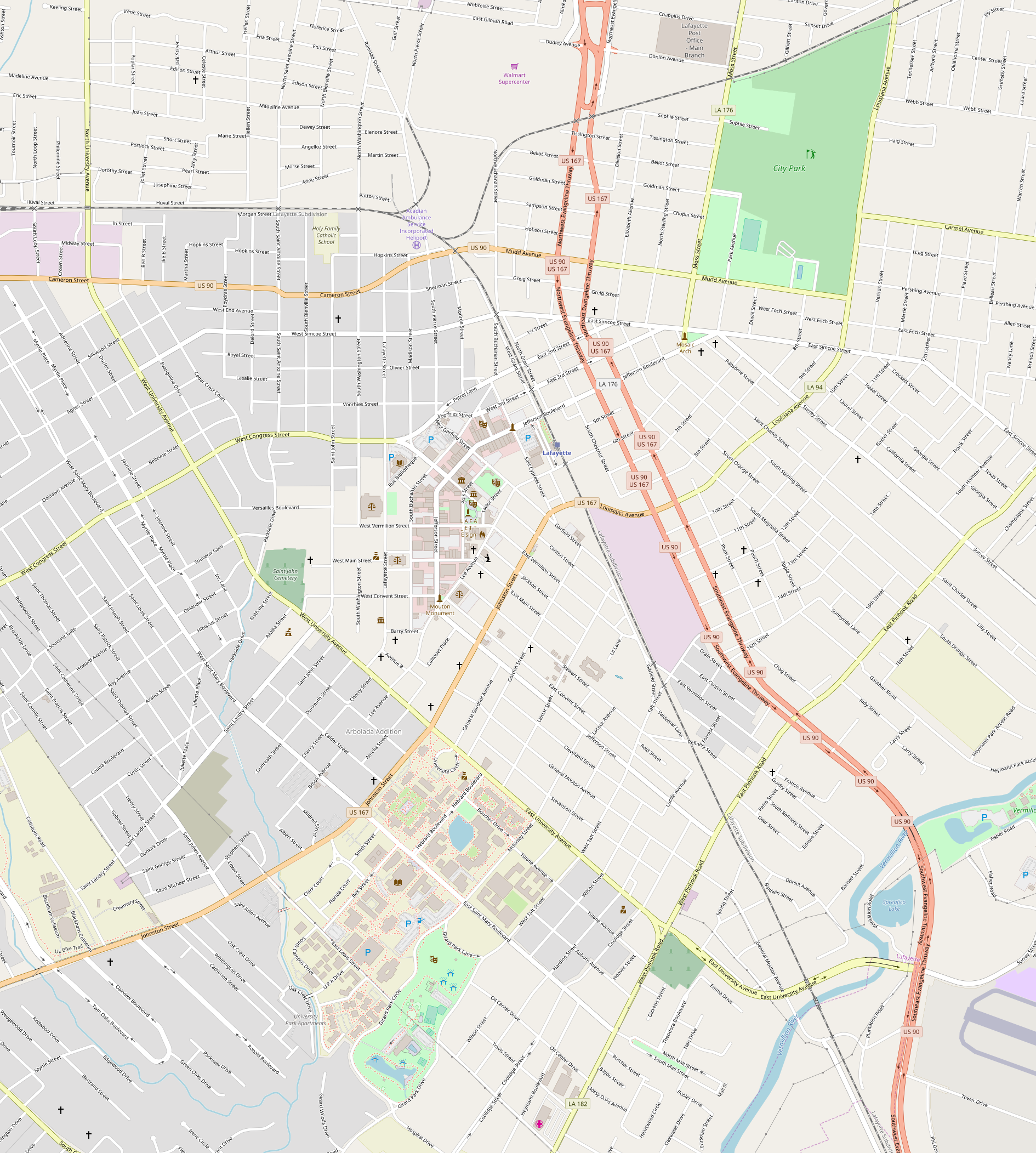
- Location within Lafayette
- Location: 515 Cathedral Street, Lafayette, Louisiana
- Coordinates: 30°13′22″N 92°01′25″W
- Area: 7 acres (2.8 ha)
- Built: 1916
- Architect: Cousin
- Architectural style: Romanesque Revival
- NRHP reference No.: 79001067 (original); 100009428 (increase)

Significant dates
- Added to NRHP: July 27, 1979
- Boundary increase: January 25, 2024

The Cathedral of Saint John the Evangelist or La Cathédrale St-Jean, originally called l'Église St-Jean du Vermilion, is the cathedral and mother church of the Roman Catholic Diocese of Lafayette in Louisiana. It was the first parish in Lafayette Parish—founded in 1821—and was designated cathedral upon the erection of the diocese in 1918.

The historic church—located at 515 Cathedral Street in downtown Lafayette—is the third structure built on the site. The land was donated in 1821 by Jean Mouton, a wealthy planter who had founded the town as Vermilionville. The cornerstone was laid in 1913, and the church was completed in 1916 in the Dutch Romanesque Revival style. A large red and white brick structure, its notable features include stained glass produced in Munich depicting the life of the patron, oil paintings of Christ and the Apostles, and a Casavant Frères organ.

St. John's Cemetery is the oldest in the city of Lafayette. Notable burials include Jean Mouton, who donated the property for the church; his son Alexandre Mouton, a U.S. senator and governor of Louisiana; his grandson Alfred Mouton, a Confederate general in the American Civil War; and Jefferson Caffery, a distinguished U.S. diplomat who was a Lafayette native.

The church and a 7-acre (2.8 ha) area comprising the Bishop's residence and the cemetery was listed on the National Register of Historic Places on July 27, 1979. The listing was enlarged in 2024.

== See also ==
- National Register of Historic Places listings in Lafayette Parish, Louisiana
- List of Catholic cathedrals in the United States
- List of cathedrals in the United States
