= St. Vincent's Seminary (Missouri) =

St. Vincent's Seminary and College, also known as St. Vincent's College and "The Cape", was an educational facility in Cape Girardeau, Missouri, which had two components: a college, providing a secular education of young men of the region; and a seminary, for the training of candidates for the Catholic priesthood to serve in the Midwestern United States. The school was operated by the priests of the Congregation of the Mission, commonly referred to as the Vincentians, as a part of their mission since their founding in 17th-century France by St. Vincent de Paul. It operated from 1838 to 1979.

== History ==
=== Foundations ===
The Vincentian Fathers arrived in the United States in 1817, coming from Italy at the invitation of Bishop Louis Dubourg, S.S., Vicar Apostolic of Louisiana and the Two Floridas, to provide theological education for potential priests for his region. He had his see in St. Louis. A parcel of land had been granted to them in a settlement 80 miles south of St. Louis, part of Dubourg's territory, known as "the Barrens". Under the leadership of the Venerable Father Felix de Andreis, C.M., they arrived in what was to become Perryville, Missouri, in 1818 and took possession of donated land. There they opened St. Mary's of the Barrens Seminary to fulfill the mission given to them by the bishop. This was the first institution of higher learning to be established west of the Mississippi River.

=== Cape Girardeau ===
In addition to their educational work, Vincentian priests would visit various towns in the surrounding region to serve the spiritual needs of Catholics. They visited Cape Girardeau in 1825. Fr John Timon, C.M., (later the first Bishop of Buffalo) began to visit the town in 1828. Over the next several years he developed a sufficiently large congregation to establish a parish church, which was opened in 1833.

A new pastor, Fr Jean-Marie Odin, CM (who later became Archbishop of New Orleans) took up residence in the town in 1836. Under his guidance, the Congregation opened St. Vincent's Male Academy on 22 October 1838, enrolling boys from the local area. The superiors of the Vincentians moved the novitiate for candidates to their Congregation from St. Mary's to St. Vincent's in May 1841. One of the first candidates to train there was Stephen V. Ryan, who also became Bishop of Buffalo.

By 1842 the priests at St. Vincent's felt the need for a college-level institution to further the education of graduates of their Academy. Thus they began to develop the plan for St. Vincent College, which was charted by the State of Missouri in February 1843. Additionally, that same year the new Bishop of St. Louis, Peter Richard Kenrick, opened a seminary in the city for his own seminarians, the St. Louis Ecclesiastical Seminary, withdrawing them from St. Mary's. The Vincentians were asked to operate this new facility—which later developed as Kenrick-Glennon Seminary. At this point, under pressure from the superiors of the Congregation in Europe, lay college students were transferred from Perryville to Cape Girardeau. The novitiate was returned to St. Mary's, which took on an entirely religious character.

By 1853, however, St. Vincent's again began to accept seminarians to pursue their college studies. Timon, by now a bishop in New York City, sent the seminarians of his diocese there. In 1847, Kenrick's diocese had been split up into a number of dioceses; he became the archbishop of Missouri. The issue of a common seminary for the various dioceses began to emerge, with the decision being made by the bishops 1858 to adopt St. Vincent's as a Provincial Seminary on an experimental basis. Ryan, then the Provincial Superior of the Congregation in America, decided to convert St. Vincent's into a purely clerical school as of the opening of the Fall term of 1859. Hopes looked high for a stable and successful educational program for the future clergy of the region. The American Civil War was to dash these expectations.

=== Civil War ===
With the outbreak of the Civil War, thousands of Federal troops were stationed in the town. Despite the threat of being requisitioned by the Army, the college continued to operate in relative safety. This was even despite a major skirmish taking place near the town. Nevertheless, concern for the safety of the students led many of the parents and bishops to remove their students from the college. Adding to this was the implementation of a military draft by President Lincoln. The Fall term of 1862 saw the student body reduced to half, to some 30 students.

== Legacy ==
After its closing, the grounds were sold to the State of Missouri. They became the home of the River Campus of Southeast Missouri State University. The main building is listed on the National Register of Historic Places.
