= American Cardinals Dinner =

The American Cardinals Dinner is an annual fundraiser that benefits The Catholic University of America (CUA). Each year, a different U.S. archdiocese hosts the Cardinals Dinner, a black-tie event which traditionally features all or most of the cardinals who serve as residential or emeritus archbishops of various U.S. dioceses. It is traditionally preceded by a Mass at the local cathedral.

== 2016 ==
The American Cardinals Dinner was not held in 2016. Instead, the financial support that would have gone toward a dinner in 2016 was to be directed toward supporting the 2016 visit of Pope Francis to the Catholic University campus, which was a very special and significant event for the university.

== 26th annual dinner (2015) ==
The 2015 dinner was held in St. Louis, Missouri, with the Mass celebrated at Cathedral Basilica of St. Louis. The Cardinals that attended were: Sean O'Malley OFMCap, Archbishop of Boston; Daniel N. DiNardo, Archbishop of Galveston-Houston; Donald W. Wuerl, Archbishop of Washington; Timothy M. Dolan, Archbishop of New York; Theodore McCarrick, Archbishop Emeritus of Washington; and Justin Rigali, Archbishop Emeritus of Philadelphia. The event was hosted by Archbishop Robert J. Carlson, Archbishop of St. Louis and John Garvey, President of The Catholic University of America. Mr. and Mrs. Charles Drury were co-chairs of the dinner and were honored with the Archbishop's Appreciation Award.

The dinner was held at The Ritz-Carlton St. Louis and raised over $1.1 million, which goes directly to support scholarships for students at The Catholic University of America.

== 25th annual dinner (2014) ==
The 2014 dinner was held in New York City, with the Mass celebrated at St. Patrick's Cathedral with Cardinal Timothy Dolan serving as homilist. The dinner raised a record $2.1 million to support scholarships.

== 20th annual dinner (2009) ==
The 20th annual dinner was held in Houston, Texas, at the Hyatt Regency Houston and was co-hosted by Very Rev. David M. O'Connell, CM, president of the university, and Daniel Cardinal DiNardo, archbishop of Galveston-Houston. Over 700 guests attended the gala, at which Angela House, a transitional-housing facility for women after incarceration, received the American Cardinals Encouragement Award. Sister Maureen O'Connell, OP, president of Angela House, accepted the award and $10,000 grant on behalf of the Houston-based organization.

The Mass preceding the dinner was held at the Co-Cathedral of the Sacred Heart, with Cardinal DiNardo as the principal celebrant and O'Connell as the homilist. The principal concelebrants were Francis Cardinal George OMI, archbishop of Chicago; Roger Cardinal Mahony, archbishop of Los Angeles; Justin Cardinal Rigali, archbishop of Philadelphia; Seán Cardinal O’Malley OFMCap, archbishop of Boston; William Cardinal Keeler, archbishop emeritus of Baltimore; Adam Cardinal Maida, archbishop emeritus of Detroit; Edward Cardinal Egan, archbishop emeritus of New York; Archbishop Pietro Sambi, apostolic nuncio to the United States; and O'Connell.

Other prelates concelebrating were Archbishop Donald Wuerl, archbishop of Washington and chancellor of CUA, along with Archbishop Emeritus Joseph Fiorenza, Auxiliary Bishop Joe S. Vásquez, and Auxiliary Bishop Emeritus Vincent M. Rizzotto of Galveston-Houston and Auxiliary Bishop Oscar Cantú of the Archdiocese of San Antonio.

== 17th annual dinner (2006) ==
At the 2006 dinner, a gift of $8,000,000 from the Knights of Columbus was announced, to renovate Keane Hall and rename it McGivney Hall after Michael J. McGivney, who founded the Knights in 1882 in New Haven, Conn.

== Past dinners ==
1. December 12, 1989, in Washington, D.C.
2. January 18, 1991, in New York, New York
3. January 11, 1992, in Chicago, Illinois
4. April 24, 1993, in Boston, Massachusetts
5. April 16, 1994, in Washington, D.C.
6. February 25, 1995, in Philadelphia, Pennsylvania
7. April 19, 1996, in Los Angeles, California
8. June 6, 1997, in Detroit, Michigan
9. May 1, 1998, in Baltimore, Maryland
10. April 23, 1999, in Boston, Massachusetts
11. May 5, 2000, in Chicago, Illinois
12. April 27, 2001, in New York, New York
13. April 26, 2002, in Philadelphia, Pennsylvania
14. May 2, 2003, in San Francisco, California
15. April 23, 2004, in Saint Paul–Minneapolis, Minnesota
16. January 28, 2005, in Miami, Florida
17. April 28, 2006, in Washington, D.C.
18. April 27, 2007, in Las Vegas, Nevada
19. April 25, 2008, in Boston, Massachusetts
20. April 24, 2009, in Houston, Texas
21. April 23, 2010 in Atlanta, Georgia
22. May 6, 2011, in Phoenix, Arizona
23. April 27, 2012, in Chicago, Illinois
24. May 10, 2013, in Washington, D.C.
25. May 30, 2014 in New York, New York
26. April 24, 2015 in St. Louis, Missouri
27. May 5, 2017 - Location TBD
28. April 27, 2018 - Location TBD

== See also ==
- List of the Catholic bishops of the United States
- List of current cardinals (by name, country, birthdate)
- College of Cardinals
- Catholic Church hierarchy
- Bishop (Catholic Church)
