= Nicolaus Aloysius Gallagher =

American prelate

The Most Reverend Nicolaus Aloysius Gallagher
- Bishop of Galveston
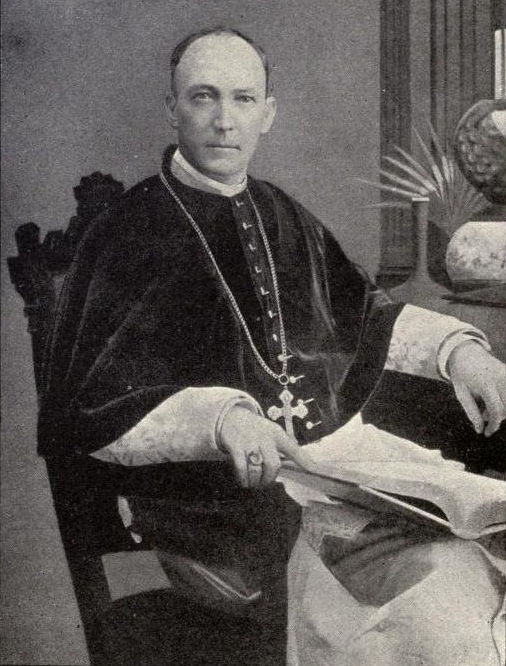
- Church: Roman Catholic Church
- See: Diocese of Galveston
- In office: December 16, 1892; January 21, 1918
- Predecessor: Claude Marie Dubuis
- Successor: Christopher Edward Byrne
- Other posts: Coadjutor Bishop of Galveston; 1882 to 1892

Orders
- Ordination: December 25, 1868 by Sylvester Horton Rosecrans
- Consecration: April 30, 1882 by Edward Fitzgerald

Personal details
- Born: February 19, 1846 Temperanceville, Ohio, US
- Died: January 21, 1918 (aged 71) Galveston, Texas, US
- Education: Mount St. Mary's of the West Seminary

Nicolaus Aloysius Gallagher (February 19, 1846 – January 21, 1918) was an American prelate of the Roman Catholic Church. He served as bishop of the Diocese of Galveston in Texas from 1892 until his death in 1918.

== Biography ==
=== Early life ===
One of eleven children, Nicolaus Gallagher was born in Temperanceville, Ohio, to John and Mary Ann (née Brinton) Gallagher. At age 10, he was tutored by a priest in Coshocton, Ohio, in English, grammar, Latin, and Greek for six years. In 1862, Gallagner entered Mount St. Mary's of the West Seminary in Cincinnati, Ohio, where he studied philosophy and theology.

=== Priesthood ===
Gallagher was ordained to the priesthood for the Diocese of Columbus by Bishop Sylvester Rosecrans on December 25, 1868. After his ordination, Gallagher served as curate at St. Patrick's Parish in Columbus, Ohio. In 1871, he left St. Patrick's to become president of St. Aloysius Seminary in Columbus.

In 1876, Gallagher was named pastor of St. Patrick's, then in 1878 also became administrator of the Diocese of Columbus. In 1880, he was named vicar general. In 1881, Bishop Claude Marie Dubuis of the Diocese of Galveston returned to his home in France due to poor health. Gallagher was sent to Galveston to become administrator of that diocese.

=== Coadjutor Bishop and Bishop of Galveston ===
On January 10, 1882, Gallagher was appointed coadjutor bishop of the Diocese of Galveston and titular bishop of Canopus by Pope Leo XIII. He received his episcopal consecration on April 30, 1882, from Bishop Edward Fitzgerald, with Bishops John Neraz and Dominic Manucy serving as co-consecrators, at St. Mary's Cathedral in Galveston. Gallagher would serve as coadjutor bishop, running the diocese, for the next 11 years. In 1886, he opened the first Catholic school for African American children in Texas. With the resignation of Dubuis on December 16, 1892, Gallagher automatically became the third bishop of Galveston .

Gallagher introduced into the diocese the Sisters of Charity of the Incarnate Word, Jesuits, Basilian Fathers, Paulist Fathers and Sisters of the Third Order of St. Dominic. These orders founded churches, schools, and hospitals throughout the diocese. He established St. Mary's Seminary at La Porte, Texas, in 1901, and Good Shepherd Home for Delinquent Girls at Houston, Texas, in 1914. He also erected parishes for Spanish-speaking Catholics in Austin, Texas, and Houston, and for African-Americans in Houston, Beaumont, and Port Arthur. After the 1900 Galveston hurricane devastated the city, Gallagher rebuilt all the destroyed Catholic institutions. At the beginning of his tenure, the diocese had 30,000 Catholics and 50 parishes; by the time of his death, there were 70,000 Catholics and 120 parishes.

=== Death and legacy ===
Gallagher died at his home in Galveston on January 21, 1918. His funeral Mass was celebrated by Bishop Theophile Meerschaert, and he was buried at St. Mary's Cathedral.

Catholic Church titles
Preceded by Claude Marie Dubuis	Bishop of Galveston; 1892–1918	Succeeded by Christopher Edward Byrne
