= George Sheltz =

American Catholic bishop (1946–2021)

His Excellency, The Most Reverend George Sheltz
- Auxiliary Bishop of Galveston–Houston
- Church: Catholic
- Archdiocese: Galveston-Houston
- Appointed: February 21, 2012
- Term ended: June 22, 2021
- Other posts: Titular Bishop of Hirina (2012-2021)

Orders
- Ordination: May 15, 1971
- Consecration: May 2, 2012 by Daniel DiNardo, Joseph Fiorenza, and Vincent M. Rizzotto

Personal details
- Born: April 20, 1946 Houston, Texas, U.S.
- Died: December 21, 2021 (aged 75) Houston, Texas
- Motto: Through Him * with Him * in Him

Styles of George Sheltz
- Reference style: His Excellency; The Most Reverend
- Spoken style: Your Excellency
- Religious style: Bishop

Ordination history of George Sheltz
History
Episcopal consecration
- Consecrated by: Daniel DiNardo

George Arthur Sheltz (April 20, 1946 – December 21, 2021) was an American Catholic prelate who served as an auxiliary bishop of the Galveston-Houston from 2012 to 2021.

== Biography ==
=== Early life ===
Sheltz was born on April 20, 1946, in Houston, Texas to George and Margaret Sheltz. He attended Annunciation Catholic School and St. Thomas High School, both in Houston. His father, George Sheltz Sr., was in the first class of permanent deacons ordained for the diocese in 1972. His brother, Anton Sheltz, was ordained a priest for the then-Diocese of Galveston-Houston in 1976. His uncle, Monsignor Anton Frank, was the first native Houstonian ordained for the diocese in 1933.

While in high school, Sheltz decided to enter the priesthood. After graduation, he entered St. Mary's Seminary and the University of St. Thomas in Houston, graduating in 1971 with a Bachelor of Arts degree in philosophy and a Master of Theology degree.

=== Priesthood ===
On May 15, 1971, Sheltz was ordained to the priesthood at Annunciation Church in Houston for the Archdiocese of Houston-Galveston by Bishop John Louis Morkovsky. After his ordination, the archdiocese assigned Sheltz to pastoral duties in five Houston parishes: Assumption, Sacred Heart Co-Cathedral; St. Vincent de Paul, Christ the Redeemer, and Prince of Peace. He also served at St. Anthony of Padua Parish in Woodlands, Texas.

While working in the parish, Sheltz also served as dean of the San Jacinto Deanery and episcopal vicar of the Northern Vicariate.

In 2000, Pope John Paul II named Sheltz a prelate of honor, with the title of monsignor. In 2007, Sheltz was named secretariat director for clergy formation and chaplaincy services. In 2010, he was named vicar general, chancellor, and moderator of the curia for the archdiocese.

=== Auxiliary Bishop of Galveston-Houston ===
On February 21, 2012, Pope Benedict XVI appointed Sheltz as titular bishop of Hirina and auxiliary bishop of Galveston-Houston. He was installed and consecrated at the Co-Cathedral of the Sacred Heart in Houston by Cardinal Daniel DiNardo on May 2, 2012.

In June 2019, an anonymous woman alleged in a letter to the archdiocese that Sheltz had sexually abused her in 1971. The author threatened to make the charge public unless the archdiocese reversed the transfer of her parish priest, Hai Dang. The allegation was investigated by the Congregation for the Doctrine of the Faith, which determined that it was totally baseless.

=== Retirement and death ===
On June 22, 2021, Sheltz retired as auxiliary bishop of Galveston-Houston.

Sheltz died in Houston on December 21, 2021, at the age of 75.

== See also ==
- Archdiocese of Galveston-Houston
- Catholic Church hierarchy
- Catholic Church in the United States
- Historical list of the Catholic bishops of the United States
- List of Catholic bishops of the United States
- Lists of patriarchs, archbishops, and bishops

== Episcopal succession ==
Catholic Church titles
| Preceded by Gilberto Fernández | Titular See of Hirina; 2012–2021 | Succeeded by Vacant |
