= Temperanceville =

Temperanceville may refer to the following places:

- Temperanceville, Ontario, a neighbourhood in the northwestern part of Richmond Hill, Canada
- Temperanceville, Arkansas, in Howard County, Arkansas, United States
- Temperanceville, Ohio, an unincorporated community
- Temperanceville, Pennsylvania, later renamed West End (Pittsburgh)
- Temperanceville, Virginia, a settlement in the northeastern part of Virginia, United States
