= Hirina =

Hirina Hirena
- City
- Country: Tunisia

Hirina (Hirena) was a city and bishopric in southern Tunisia known only through ecclesiastical records.

Nothing is known of the city, the name of which may have been Hirina, Hiren or Iren, except that it was in the Roman province of Byzacena.

It is now a Latin titular bishopric.

== Ecclesiastical history ==
It was one of the many suffragan dioceses of the Metropolitan Archbishopric of Hadrumetum (Sousse).

Three bishops are known:

- Tertullian, present at the conference of Carthage in 311
- Saturus, exiled in 484 by Huneric with many other bishops
- Theodore, who in 641 signed the letter from the Council of Byzacium to Constantine, son of Heraclius, against Monothelitism.

== Titular see ==
It was nominally restored as Latin Roman Catholic titular see of the lowest (episcopal) rank, Hirine (until 1924 also called Hirena) or Irina in Italian.

It has had the following incumbents, with a single archiepiscopal exception :

- Giuseppe Isidoro Persico (1726.03.20 – 1731.06.18)
- Aleksandras Kazimieras Gorainis (Aleksander Kazimierz Horain) (1731.09.24 – 1774.07.24)
- Wojciech Józef Radoszewski (1787.04.23 – 1796.06.06)
- Joannes Augustus Paredis (1840.12.18 – 1853.03.04)
- Raffaele Di Nonno, Redemptorists (C.SS.R.) (1883.08.09 – 1889) (later Archbishop)
- James Charles McDonald (1890.06.13 – 1891.05.01)
- Emmanuel Segrada, Pontifical Institute for Foreign Missions (P.I.M.E.) (1908.05.10 – 1936)
- Thomas Aloysius Boland (1940.05.21 – 1947.06.21) (later Archbishop)
- Emile-Joseph Socquet, White Fathers (M. Afr.) (1948.01.08 – 1955.09.14) (later Archbishop)
- Mario Di Lieto (1956.08.11 – 1957.11.21)
- Reginald John Delargey (1957.11.25 – 1970.09.01) (later Cardinal)
- Titular Archbishop Ugo Camozzo (1970.09.22 – 1977.07.07)
- Florian Kuntner (1977.09.30 – 1994.03.30)
- Fernando María Bargalló (1994.04.27 – 1997.05.13)
- Gilberto Fernández (1997.06.23 – 2011.09.30)
- George Arthur Sheltz (2012.02.21 – 2021.12.21), Auxiliary Bishop of Galveston–Houston (Texas, USA)
- Frank R. Schuster (2022.05.03 - ...), Auxiliary Bishop of Seattle (Washington, USA)

== External links and sources ==
- GCatholic
- Catholic Hierarchy article
