= Saint Vincent's College Building =

- St. Vincent's College Building
- U.S. National Register of Historic Places
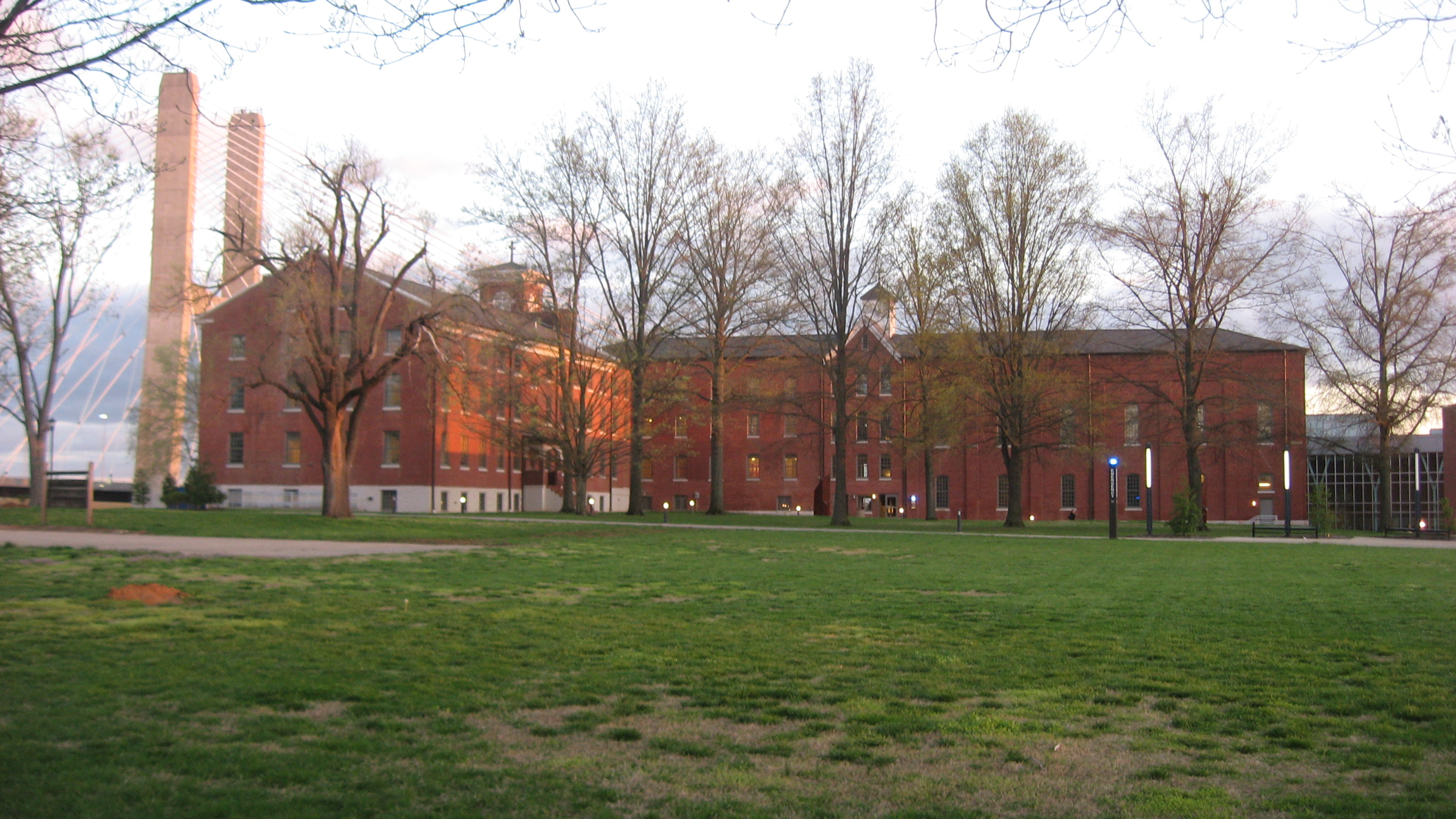
- Saint Vincent's College Building, April 2013

- Location within Missouri Location within the United States
- Location: 201 Morgan Oak St., Cape Girardeau, Missouri
- Coordinates: 37°17′57″N 89°31′16″W
- Area: 5.7 acres (2.3 ha)
- Built: 1843
- Architect: Lansmon, Joseph
- Architectural style: Georgian, Italianate
- NRHP reference No.: 05001092
- Added to NRHP: September 30, 2005

St. Vincent's College Building, part of the former St. Vincent's Seminary, is a historic educational building located at Cape Girardeau, Missouri. It built between 1843 and 1871, and is a three-story, 52,000-square-foot, L-shaped brick building on a limestone foundation. The building and its additions reflect the influences of Colonial American Georgian architecture and the popular mid-19th century Italian Villa style. The building served as the College's main residential, classroom, and chapel building. The college closed in 1910, after which it housed a private high school.

It was listed on the National Register of Historic Places in 2005.
