= Brothers of the Holy Infancy =

Catholic educational religious congregation

The Brothers of the Holy Infancy are a Roman Catholic male religious congregation devoted to the education of boys.

== History ==
Founded in 1853 (172 years ago) by John Timon (1797–1867), the first Bishop of Buffalo, with the special aim of the sanctification of its members and the care of destitute and wayward boys. Soon after becoming bishop, Timon purchased a tract of land in West Seneca, now the city of Lackawanna, and established St. Joseph's Male Orphan Asylum and, a little later, St. John's Protectory for wayward and destitute boys. Thomas Hines was appointed superintendent. These institutions struggled on under a heavy debt until 1882, when Nelson H. Baker was placed in charge. Baker founded the Society of Our Lady of Victory to care for destitute Catholic children. From this time the work prospered.

In 1909, under the general title of Our Lady of Victory Home, the following buildings were grouped: St. Joseph's Protectory, with 700 boys; St. Joseph's Orphan Asylum, with 250 boys; Working Boys' Home, with 75 boys; Our Lady of Victory Infant Asylum, caring for about 150. The 23 brothers gave special attention to the trade school of the protectory, where they taught printing, press-feeding, book-binding, baking, shoe-making, tailoring, plumbing, gas-fitting, and other trades.

Young men are received from the age of sixteen to thirty-five. After a probation of six months the candidate receives the habit. After two years of the novitiate, the novice takes the vows of poverty, chastity and obedience. The brothers maintain a juniorate in which boys are received from twelve to fifteen years of age and trained to the work carried on by the community. They are governed by the bishop, who appoints a priest to superintend the institution and act as superior. Next in authority are the brother superior and his assistants, who are elected every three years.
