= Jean-Marie Odin =

French-born prelate

The Most Reverend Jean-Marie Odin C.M.
- Archbishop of New Orleans
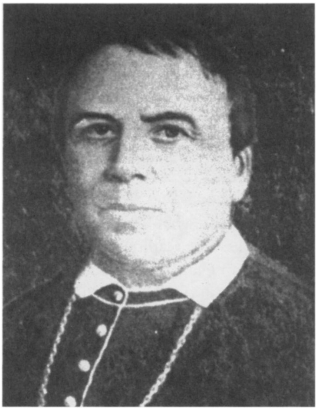
- Church: Roman Catholic Church
- See: Archdiocese of New Orleans
- Installed: February 15, 1861
- Term ended: May 25, 1870
- Predecessor: Antoine Blanc
- Successor: Napoléon-Joseph Perché
- Other posts: Vicar Apostolic of Texas (1842–1847); Bishop of Galveston (1847–1861)

Orders
- Ordination: May 4, 1823 by Louis William Valentine DuBourg
- Consecration: March 6, 1842 by Antoine Blanc

Personal details
- Born: February 25, 1800 Ambierle, Department of Loire, France
- Died: May 25, 1870 (aged 70) Ambierle, Department of Loire, France
- Buried: Church of Ambierle

Jean-Marie Odin, C.M. (English: John Mary; February 25, 1800 – May 25, 1870) was a French-born Catholic prelate and member of the Congregation of the Mission who served as Archbishop of New Orleans from 1861 to 1870. He previously served as the first Vicar Apostolic of Texas from 1841 to 1847 and as the first Bishop of Galveston from 1847 to 1861. He has been called the father of the modern Catholic Church in Texas.

== Biography ==
=== Early life ===
The seventh of ten children, Jean-Marie Odin was born in Hauteville, an hamlet inside the city of Ambierle in the Department of Loire in France to Jean Odin and Claudine Marie (née Seyrol) Odin. After showing interest in Catholicism at age nine, Odin's parents sent him to study Latin under his uncle, the pastor of Noailly. After his uncle died, he returned home to study on his own. Odin eventually attended schools in Roanne in Verrières, then began his studies in philosophy at L'Argentière and Alix. He finally ended up at the Sulpician seminary in Lyon.

In 1822, while still in seminary, Odin was recruited by a representative of Bishop Louis Dubourg to do mission work for the Archdiocese of New Orleans. That same year, Odin immigrated to the United States, After arriving in New Orleans, the archbishop sent him to Perryville, Missouri, to complete his formation as a priest at St. Mary's of the Barrens Seminary. Odin professed vows in the Congregation of the Mission (also known as the Vincentians) on November 8, 1822.

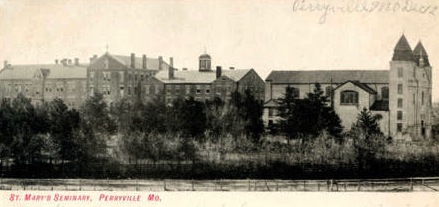
St. Mary's of the Barrens (before 1907)

=== Priesthood ===
Odin was ordained to the priesthood for the Vincentians by Bishop Dubourg on May 4, 1823. After his ordination, Dubourg performed missionary work in New Madrid, Missiouri, and with Native American tribes along the Arkansas River. He also became a faculty member at St. Mary's of the Barrens' seminary, later being named president. Odin accompanied Bishop Joseph Rosati to the Second Provincial Council of Baltimore in 1833 as a theologian. He later briefly served as pastor of St. Vincent de Paul Parish in Cape Girardeau, Missouri, opening a Catholic school there in 1838.

On October 24, 1839, Pope Gregory XVI erected the Apostolic Prefecture of Texas to cover the territory of the newly independent Republic of Texas. After Odin was assigned as vice-prefect apostolic under Fr John Timon, he moved to Texas. Odin worked to bring back Catholics who had left the church during the Texas Revolution as well as to proselytize among Protestants and Native Americans. In December 1840, Gregory XVI appointed Odin as coadjutor bishop of what was then the Diocese of Detroit, but Odin declined the position.

=== Vicar Apostolic of Texas ===
On July 16, 1841, Gregory XVI appointed Odin as the first Vicar Apostolic of Texas and Titular Bishop of Claudiopolis in Isauria. He received his episcopal consecration in New Orleans on March 6, 1842, from Bishop Antoine Blanc, with Bishops Michael Portier and John J. Chanche serving as co-consecrators.

With the assistance of the French chargé d'affaires, Alphonse Dubois de Saligny, Odin successfully negotiated the Texas government's confirmation of the church's title to fifteen acres in San Antonio. During his tenure, the Texan Congress returned several churches that had been secularized by the Mexican government. He opened several schools and invited the Ursuline nuns to operate them. In December 1845, the Republic of Texas was accepted into the United States as the State of Texas. Odin also purchased a number of enslaved African Americans during this period.

=== Bishop of Galveston ===
On May 21, 1847, Odin was named the first bishop of the newly erected Diocese of Galveston, which included all of Texas. He recruited the Brothers of Mary and Oblates of Mary Immaculate to operate St. Mary's University in Galveston, which he established in 1854. He also completed arduous visitations into the more remote parts of Texas, and twice visited Europe to secure priests and material help for the diocese. By the end of his tenure, he had increased the number of priests to 84 and the number of churches to 50; for his many efforts he has been called the father of the modern Catholic Church in Texas.

=== Archbishop of New Orleans ===
Odin was appointed the second Archbishop of New Orleans by Pope Pius IX on February 15, 1861. When Odin arrived in New Orleans, Louisiana had seceded from the United States and the American Civil War had started. Like many other Catholic clergy in the American South, Odin was a Confederate sympathizer. He was one of Pope Pius IX's contacts in his unsuccessful attempts to mediate a peace agreement to end the war. Odin allowed priests from the diocese to serve as chaplains in the Confederate States Army and nuns from the diocese served in field hospitals across the Southern states.

New Orleans was occupied by the Union Army in May 1862. Union troops used church buildings for offices, hospitals and barracks. With the finances of the archdiocese impacted by the war, Odin issued austerity measures in January 1863 that met with significant opposition. That winter, he went to Rome to obtain papal approval for his financial plan. While in Europe, he recruited 30 seminarians and five Ursuline nuns to move to New Orleans in early 1863. In April 1863, Odin returned to New Orleans.

Odin soon ran into conflict with Fr Claude Paschal Maistre, a French priest who was a strong advocate for the abolition of slavery. Odin put Maistre's parish under an interdict in May 1863, accusing Maistre of "preaching the love of liberty and independence" to slaves and "exciting insurrection against their masters". When Maistre officiated the funeral of André Cailloux, a mixed-race soldier in the Union Army who died heroically, Odin expressed his condemnation. Odin discovered that Maistre had left France under a cloud of accusations of financial impropriety; he used this as a pretext to restrict Maistre. Maistre was only accepted back in good standing to the priesthood after Odin's death.

Odin incorporated the archdiocese in 1866 and closed the diocesan seminary in 1867 due to lack of funds. He founded the diocesan newspaper, The Morning Star, in February 1868. Odin went to Rome to attend the First Vatican Council in 1869, but left the city early for health reasons. Suffering from neuralgia and in overall poor health, Odin went home to Saint-Georges-Haute-Ville to convalesce. He would never return to the United States. He died in Ambierle, Loire, on May 25, 1870, at age 70.

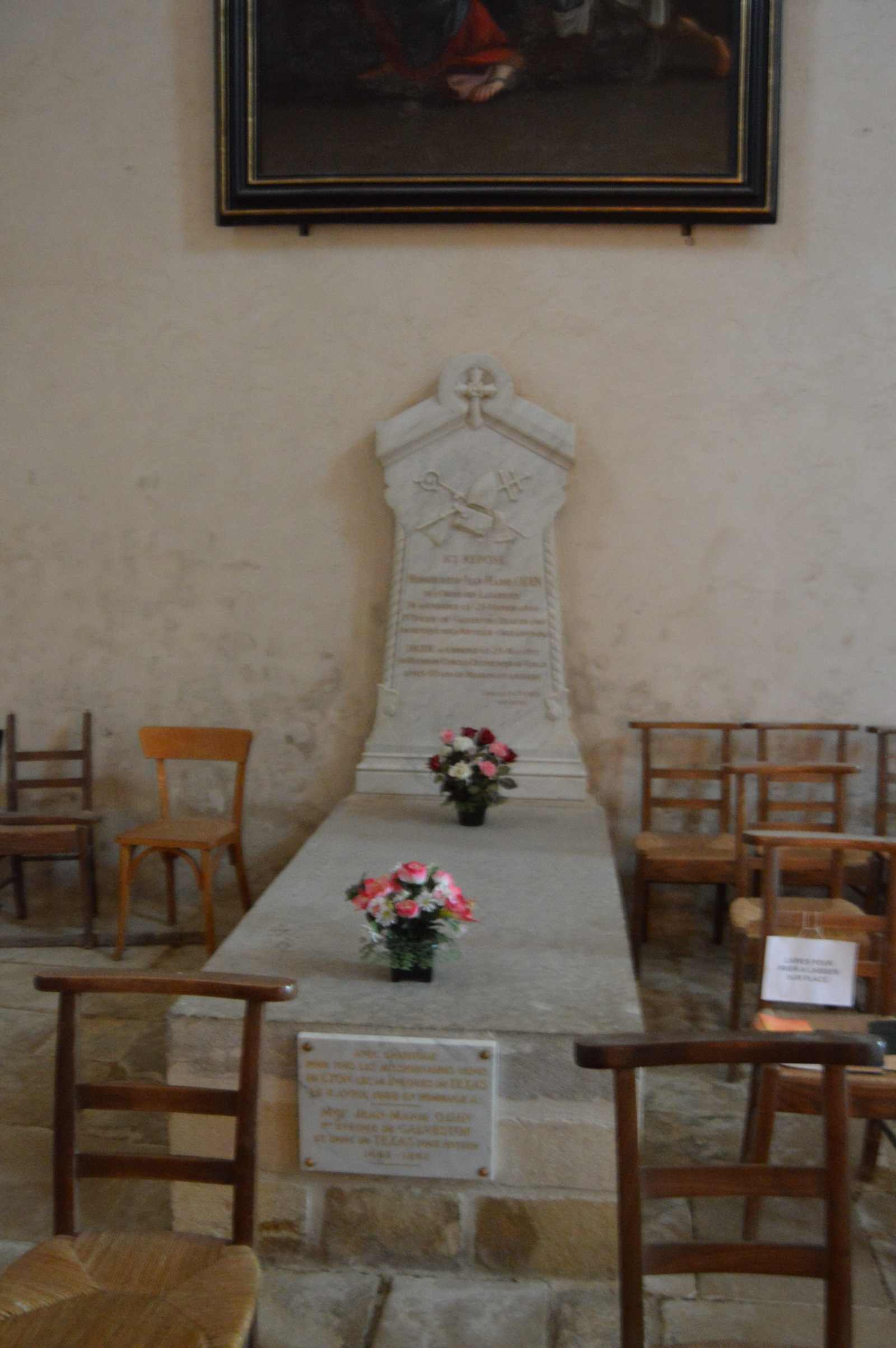
Archbishop Odin's tombstone, church of Ambierle

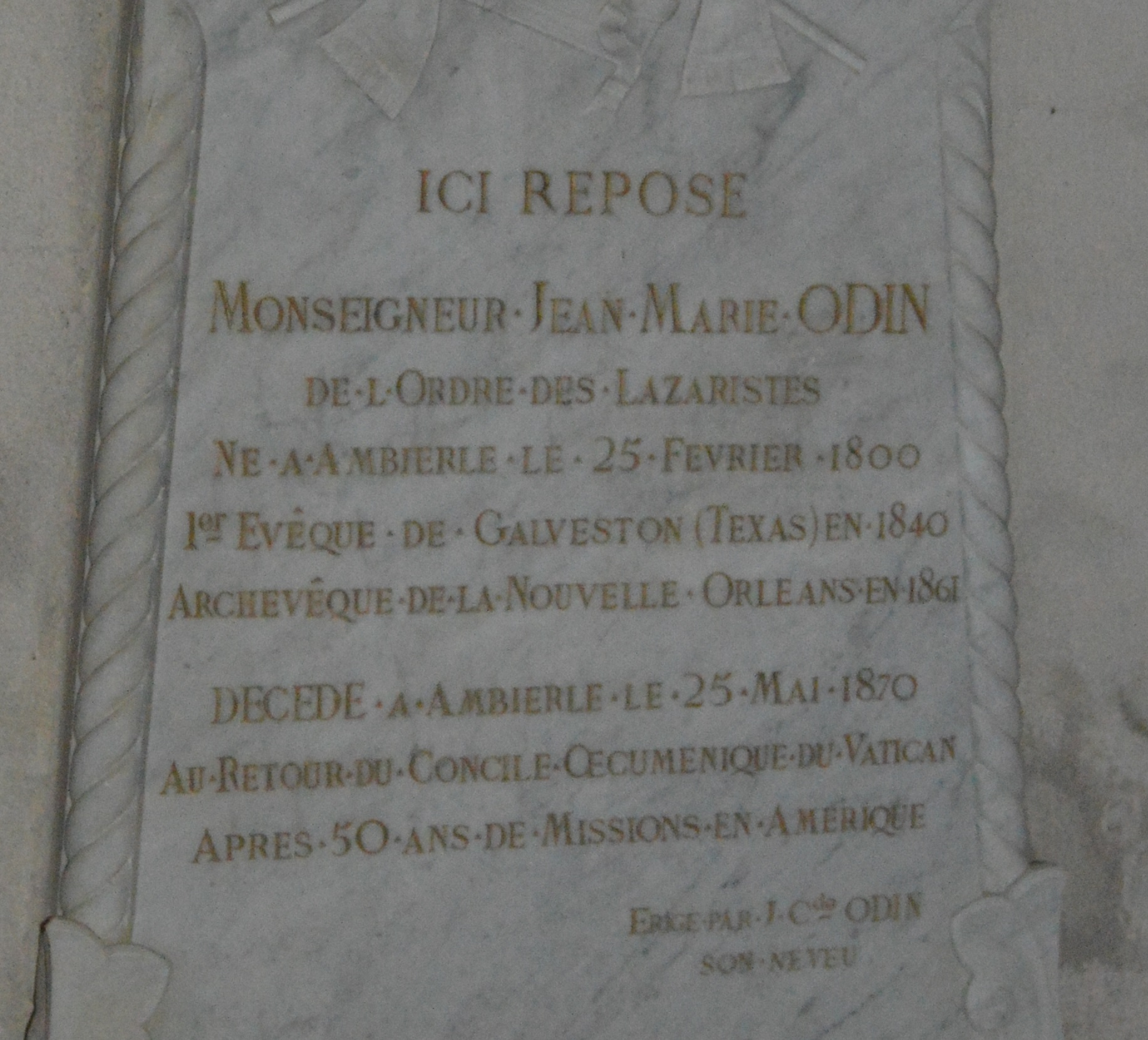
Epitaph on Odin's tombstone

Catholic Church titles
Preceded by Antoine Blanc	Archbishop of New Orleans; 1861–1870	Succeeded by Napoléon-Joseph Perché
Preceded by None	Bishop of Galveston; 1847–1861	Succeeded by Claude Marie Dubuis
Preceded by None	Vicar Apostolic of Texas; 1841–1847	Succeeded by None
