= Stephen V. Ryan =

His Excellency, The Right Reverend Stephen Vincent Ryan C.M.
- Bishop of Buffalo
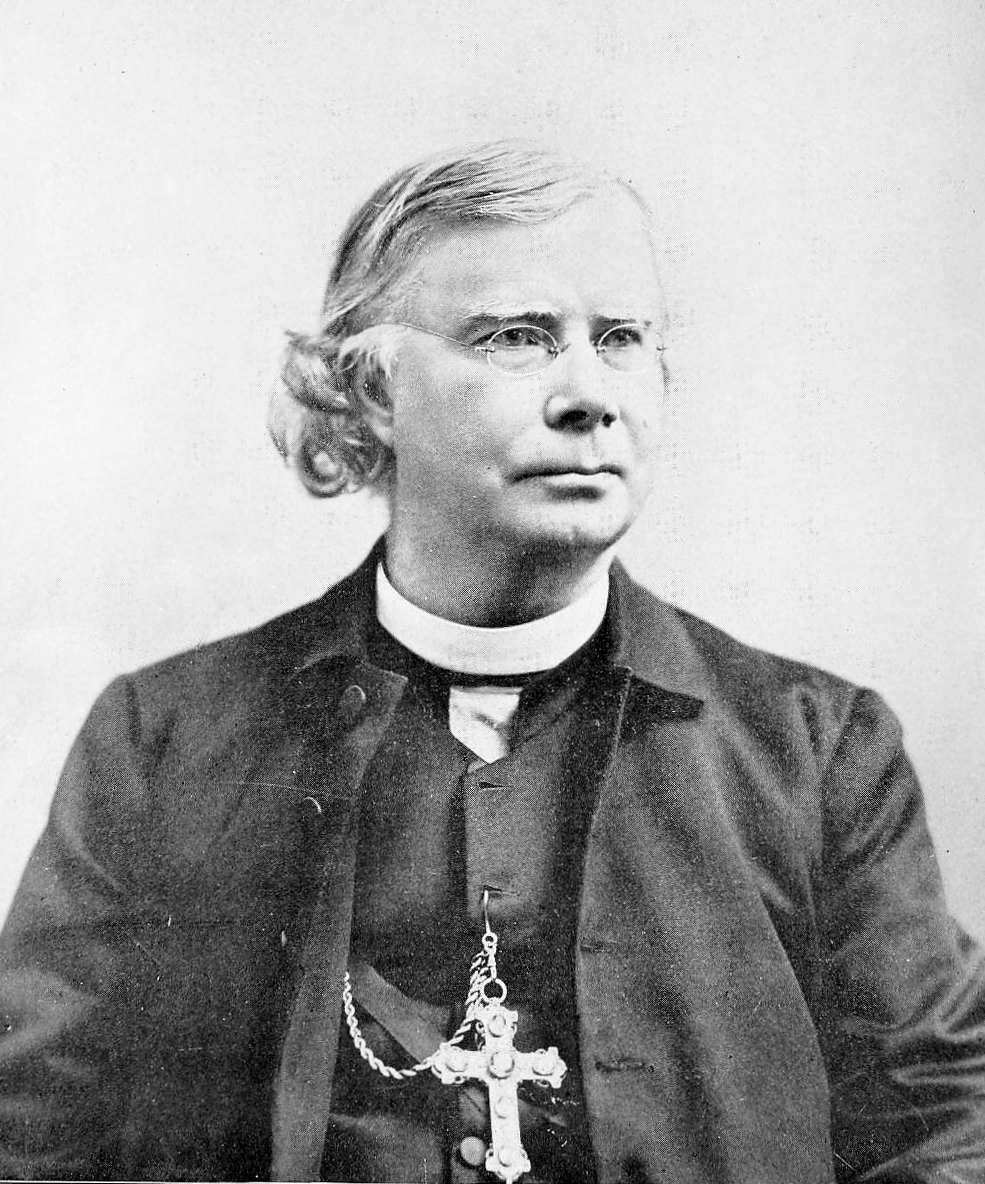
- Church: Catholic Church
- See: Diocese of Buffalo
- Appointed: March 3, 1868
- Term ended: April 10, 1896 (his death)
- Predecessor: John Timon
- Successor: James Edward Quigley

Orders
- Ordination: June 24, 1849 by Peter Richard Kenrick
- Consecration: November 8, 1868 by John McCloskey

Personal details
- Born: January 1, 1825 Almonte, Ontario, Canada
- Died: April 10, 1896 (aged 71) Buffalo, New York, US
- Education: St. Charles Borromeo Seminary; St. Mary's Seminary of the Barrens

Stephen Vincent Ryan, C.M. (January 1, 1825 – April 10, 1896) was a Canadian-born American prelate of the Catholic Church. A member of the Congregation of the Mission, he served as Bishop of Buffalo from 1868 until his death in 1896.

== Biography ==
=== Early life ===
Stephen Ryan was born on January 1, 1825 in Almonte, Ontario, to Martin and Margaret (née McCarthy) Ryan. His parents were natives of the Kingdom of Ireland who lived in Sixmilebridge before immigrating to Canada, and Ryan was the fifth of their nine children. At his baptism, the priest is alleged to have remarked, "This child will command an army yet." When Ryan was three years old, the family moved to Pottsville, Pennsylvania. He was confirmed by the visiting Mexican bishop Joaquín Fernández de Madrid y Canal in 1835 and then took the name Vincent.

Deciding to become a priest, Ryan entered St. Charles Borromeo Seminary in Philadelphia, Pennsylvania, at age 15 to begin his studies. After the accession of a Vincentian rector at the seminary, he decided to join that religious order and enrolled at St. Mary's Seminary of the Barrens in Perryville, Missouri. He made his profession as a Vincentian on May 6, 1846.

=== Priesthood ===
Ryan was ordained a priest for the Vincentians on June 24, 1849, by Archbishop Peter Richard Kenrick in St. Louis, Missouri. He remained at the Barrens until 1851, when the Vincentians added him to the faculty at St. Vincent's College in Cape Girardeau. He was elevated to president of the college in 1856. The following year, Ryan was appointed as visitor, or head, of the Vincentian community in the United States. At the time, he was only 32 years old and but eight years a priest. Upon meeting Ryan, Cardinal Alessandro Barnabò of the Congregation for the Propagation of the Faith supposedly exclaimed, "What young men they make Visitors in America!"

During his 11 years as visitor (1857-1868), Ryan guided the community through the difficult days of the American Civil War. At this time, the Vincentians had 57 priests, 40 brothers, ten scholastics, and seven novices. In one of his final acts as visitor, he transferred the provincial headquarters from St. Louis to the Germantown neighborhood of Philadelphia in 1867.

=== Bishop of Buffalo ===
On March 3, 1868, Ryan was appointed as the second bishop of Buffalo by Pope Pius IX. He initially refused the position and returned his letter of appointment to Rome. However, he was eventually persuaded to accept it. Ryan received his episcopal consecration on November 8, 1868, from Archbishop John McCloskey, with Bishops John Loughlin and John Lynch serving as co-consecrators, at St. Joseph's Cathedral in Buffalo.

From 1869 to 1870, Ryan participated in the First Vatican Council in rome. Ryan unified the Catholic school system in the diocese and established a commission to supervise it He founded the diocesan newspaper, The Catholic Union. He also engaged in a public controversy with Arthur Coxe, the Episcopal Bishop of Western New York, over the issue of apostolic succession.

=== Death ===
Ryan died on April 10, 1896, in Buffalo at age 71. He was interred next to Bishop John Timon at St. Joseph's Cathedral. His tenure as bishop spanned 28 years, the longest in the history of the diocese.

Catholic Church titles
Preceded by John Timon	Bishop of Buffalo; 1868–1896	Succeeded by James E. Quigley
