= Claude Marie Dubuis =

French-born prelate

The Most Reverend Claude Marie Dubuis
- Bishop of Galveston
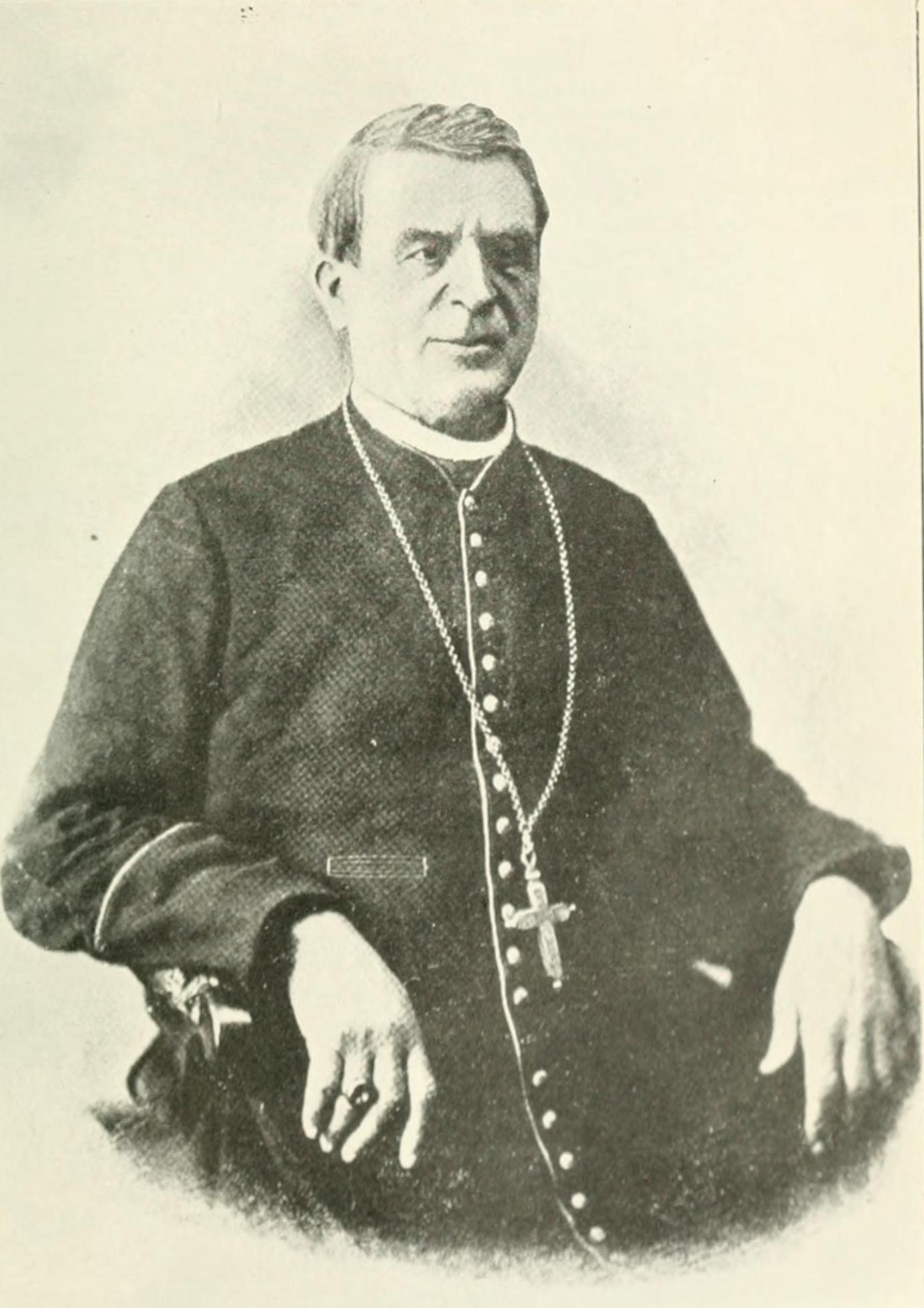
- Church: Roman Catholic Church
- See: Diocese of Galveston
- In office: November 23, 1862 - December 16, 1892
- Predecessor: Jean-Marie Odin
- Successor: Nicolaus Aloysius Gallagher

Orders
- Ordination: June 1, 1844 by Louis Jacques Maurice de Bonald
- Consecration: November 23, 1862 by Jean-Marie Odin

Personal details
- Born: March 8, 1817 Coutouvre, Department of Loire, France
- Died: May 22, 1895 (aged 78) Vernaison, France

Claude Marie Dubuis (March 10, 1817 – May 22, 1895) was a French-born prelate of the Roman Catholic Church. He served as the second bishop of the Diocese of Galveston in Texas. from 1862 until his death in 1892. He founded the Sisters of Charity of the Incarnate Word.

== Early life ==
Claude Dubuis was born on March 10, 1817, to François and Antoinette (Dubost) Dubuis, in Coutouvre, Loire, where he was raised on his parents' farm. At age ten, he went live with his uncle, a member of a religious order, to prepare for seminary. In 1833, Dubuis entered the seminary at Sainte-Foy-l'Argentière. However, his preparation was insufficient, particularly in Greek language, and Dubuis dropped out after six months.

After leaving the seminary, Dubuis returned to his home in Têche to work as a day laborer. However, he decided to prepare again for seminary and went to a different tutor in a nearby village. After studying Latin, Greek, and French grammar for eight months, he entered a minor seminary in Saint-Jodard, where he passed all of his courses. He then returned to the seminary at Sainte-Foy-l'Argentière. where he later graduated with honors. In 1840, Dubuis entered the major seminary of St. Irenaeus at Lyon.

== Priesthood ==
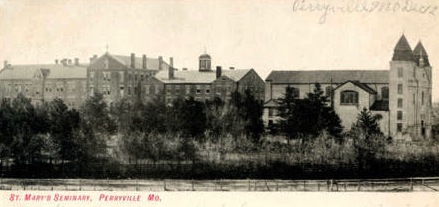
St. Mary's of the Barrens (before 1907)

On June 1, 1844, Dubuis was ordained into the priesthood for the Archdiocese of Lyon by Cardinal Louis-Jacques-Maurice de Bonald in Lyon. In 1846, Dubuis met Bishop Jean Marie Odin, the apostolic vicar for Texas. Odin was in Lyon recruiting priests to work for the Apostolic Vicarate of Texas, which then incorporated all of the new State of Texas. Dubuis decided to immigrate to the United States.

In late 1846, Dubuis sailed with several other recruited priests from Le Havre in France to New Orleans. After arriving in Louisiana in early 1847, he was sent to learn English at the St. Mary's of the Barrens seminary in Perryville, Missouri.

Dubuis returned later in 1847 to Texas, where he was assigned as pastor of a parish in Castroville. The parishioners were mainly German or Alsatian immigrants. They had a very small church and a crude hut for the priest to live in. Dubuis started learning the Alsatian language, then began building a new residence for the clergy. He opened a new school and was teaching 80 students within the first year.

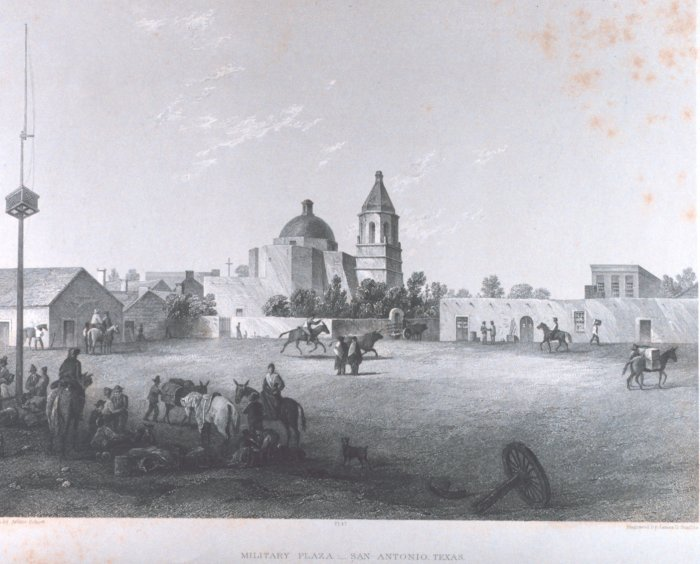
Church of San Fernando, San Antonio, TX c.1857

Dubuis travelled through his parish on foot or on horseback. On one occasion, he spent a night in a tree to escape surging floodwaters. Dubuis often had to ride through Comanche territory and was detained four times by Native Americans. Some Native Americans would occasionally stop by the Castroville church to listen to the music. By 1850, Dubuis had constructed a second, larger church.

In 1850, Bishop Odin sent Dubuis to France to recruit missionaries and visit his family. After returning to Texas in 1851, he was appointed pastor of San Fernando Parish in San Antonio, Texas, and vicar general of the diocese. At San Fernando, announcements from the pulpit were made in English, French, German, and Spanish. At first, Dubuis was not sufficiently conversant in Spanish to administer the last rites, Odin stayed in San Antonio until a Spanish-speaking priest arrived to assist him.

On February 15, 1861, Bishop Odin was appointed archbishop of the Diocese of New Orleans. Dubuis traveled to New Orleans in June 1861 as he was planning another recruiting trip to Europe. However, with the start of the American Civil War in April 1861, the Union Navy started blockading the port of New Orleans. Bishop Odin, who was recommending Dubuis as his replacement, left for Europe that year to get Vatican approval of austerity measures he wanted to enact on the archdiocese. Dubuis probably did not make it out of New Orleans until April 1862.

== Bishop of Galveston ==
On October 21, 1862, Pope Pius IX appointed Dubuis as the second bishop of the Diocese of Galveston. He was consecrated by Bishop Odin on November 23, 1862, in Lyon.

In May 1863, Dubuis traveled from France to Galveston. After the end of the war, Dubuis established additional parishes, hospitals and schools. In September 1865, the Sisters of St. Joseph in New Orleans requested that Archbishop Odin to send Dubuis to take confessions, as their usual confessor was unavailable and "Dubuis is so humble that he would come."

In 1866, cholera broke out in the diocese. Unable to persuade an American religious congregations to come to Galveston, Dubuis persuaded the Sisters of Divine Providence from Saint-Jean-de-Bassel in France to come instead. During his tenure as bishop, he brought almost seventy religious congregations into Texas. On one trip to Europe, he secured the services of the Congregation of the Resurrection to minister to the Polish community in Texas. Dubuis founded the Sisters of Charity of the Incarnate Word, a community that came to play a significant role in the provision of healthcare services in Texas. In 1873, at Dubuis' request, the Sisters of Saint Mary of Namur in Lockport, New York established the Academy of the Sacred Heart for girls in Waco, Texas.

Dubuis returned to Castroville as bishop to lay the cornerstone for the third Church of St. Louis. In 1866, Dubuis made his first episcopal visit to the Corpus Christi area, returning the following year. As early as 1870 Dubuis, began sending Father Vincent Perrier twice a year to visit Fort Worth, Texas. Dubuis attended the First Vatican Council in Rome from 1869 to 1870. In 1874, the Diocese of Galveston was split when the western half of Texas was established as the Diocese of San Antonio.

== Retirement and legacy ==
Suffering from poor health, Dubuis left Galveston in 1881 to permanently return to France, settling at Vernaison in the Metropolis of Lyon. He left the diocese under the supervision of coadjutor bishop for the next 12 years. Pope Leo XIII accepted his resignation as bishop of Galveston on December 16, 1892, and named Dubuis titular archbishop of Arca in Armenia. In retirement, Dubuis assisted Cardinal Pierre-Hector Coullié, the bishop of Lyon, in episcopal work.

Claude Dubuis died in Vernaison on May 22, 1895.

== Episcopal succession ==
Catholic Church titles
Preceded by Jean-Marie Odin	Bishop of Galveston; 1862–1892	Succeeded by Nicolaus Aloysius Gallagher
