= Italo Dell'Oro =

Italian American Catholic prelate (born 1953)

His Excellency, The Most Reverend Italo Dell’Oro CRS
- Auxiliary Bishop of Galveston-Houston
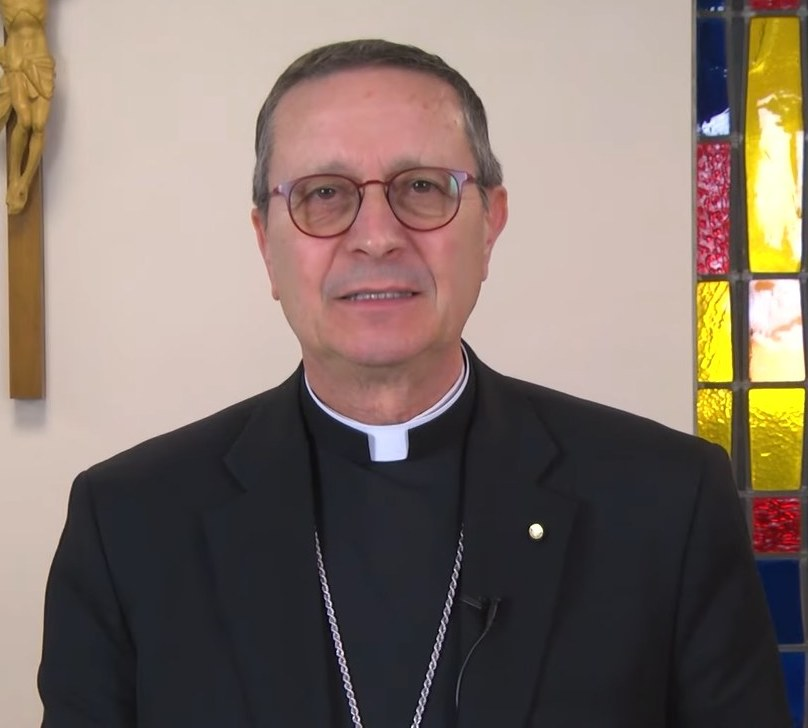
- Dell’Oro in 2022
- Archdiocese: Galveston-Houston
- Appointed: May 18, 2021
- Installed: July 2, 2021
- Other post: Titular Bishop of Sucarda

Orders
- Ordination: September 11, 1982 by Teresio Ferraroni
- Consecration: July 2, 2021 by Daniel DiNardo, Brendan J. Cahill, and Michael Sis

Personal details
- Born: June 20, 1953 (age 73) Malgrate, Italy
- Education: Pontifical Athenaeum of Saint Anselm; Rivier University
- Motto: Abyssus abyssum vocat (Latin for 'Deep calls to deep')
- Styles
- Reference style: His Excellency; The Most Reverend
- Spoken style: Your Excellency
- Religious style: Bishop

Italo Dell’Oro, C.R.S. (born June 20, 1953) is an Italian-born American Catholic prelate serving as auxiliary bishop for the Archdiocese of Galveston-Houston in Texas since 2021.

== Biography ==
=== Early life ===
Dell’Oro was born on June 20, 1953, in Malgrate, in the province of Lecco, Italy. His parents were Giuseppe Dell'Oro and Silene (Crippa) Dell'Oro. He has two sisters, Michela and Edvige (Edy). His first cousin is Bishop Adelio Dell'Oro of the Diocese of Karaganda in Kazakhstan.

In 1978, Dell'Oro entered the Somascan Fathers seminary in Rome, making his first profession to the congregation. He took his solemn vows to the Somascan Fathers in 1981. and received his Bachelor of Sacred Theology degree in 1982 from the Pontifical Athenaeum of Saint Anselm in Rome

=== Priesthood ===
On September 11, 1982, Dell’Oro was ordained to the priesthood for the Congregation of Somascan Fathers at the Santuario Del Santissimo Crocifisso in Como, Italy by Bishop Teresio Ferraroni of the Diocese of Como.

Three years after his ordination, Dell'Oro came to the United States to work as a priest assistant at Pine Haven Boys Center in Allenstown, New Hampshire. This was a school for troubled children that was operated by the Somascan Fathers. In 1988, he received a Master of Arts degree in counseling and psychotherapy from Rivier University in Nashua, New Hampshire.

In 1992, Dell'Oro was transferred to Houston, Texas, where he became pastor at Assumption Parish in that city. After eight years at Assumption, he was appointed dean of the Northeast Deanery in Houston. This was followed in 2001 by his appointment as vocations director at the Somascan Fathers House of Formation in Houston. Dell'Oro was appointed director of ministry to priests for the archdiocese in 2005, a position he would hold for the next ten years. In 2014, he was elevated to formation director. In 2015, Dell'Oro became vicar for clergy and the secretariat director for clergy formation and chaplaincy services. He was named vicar general in 2021.

=== Auxiliary Bishop of Galveston-Houston ===
Pope Francis appointed Dell’Oro as auxiliary bishop of Galveston-Houston on May 18, 2021. On July 2, 2021, he was consecrated at the Co-Cathedral of the Sacred Heart in Houston by Cardinal Daniel DiNardo. Archbishop Franco Moscone was to serve as a co-consecrator but could not travel from Italy to the United States to attend due to the COVID-19 pandemic travel restrictions. Bishop Brendan J. Cahill served instead as co-consecrator.

== See also ==
- Catholic Church hierarchy
- Catholic Church in the United States
- Historical list of the Catholic bishops of the United States
- List of Catholic bishops of the United States
- Lists of patriarchs, archbishops, and bishops

== Episcopal succession ==
Catholic Church titles
Preceded by -	Auxiliary Bishop of Galveston-Houston; 2021-Present	Succeeded by -
