= Ambierle =

- Commune
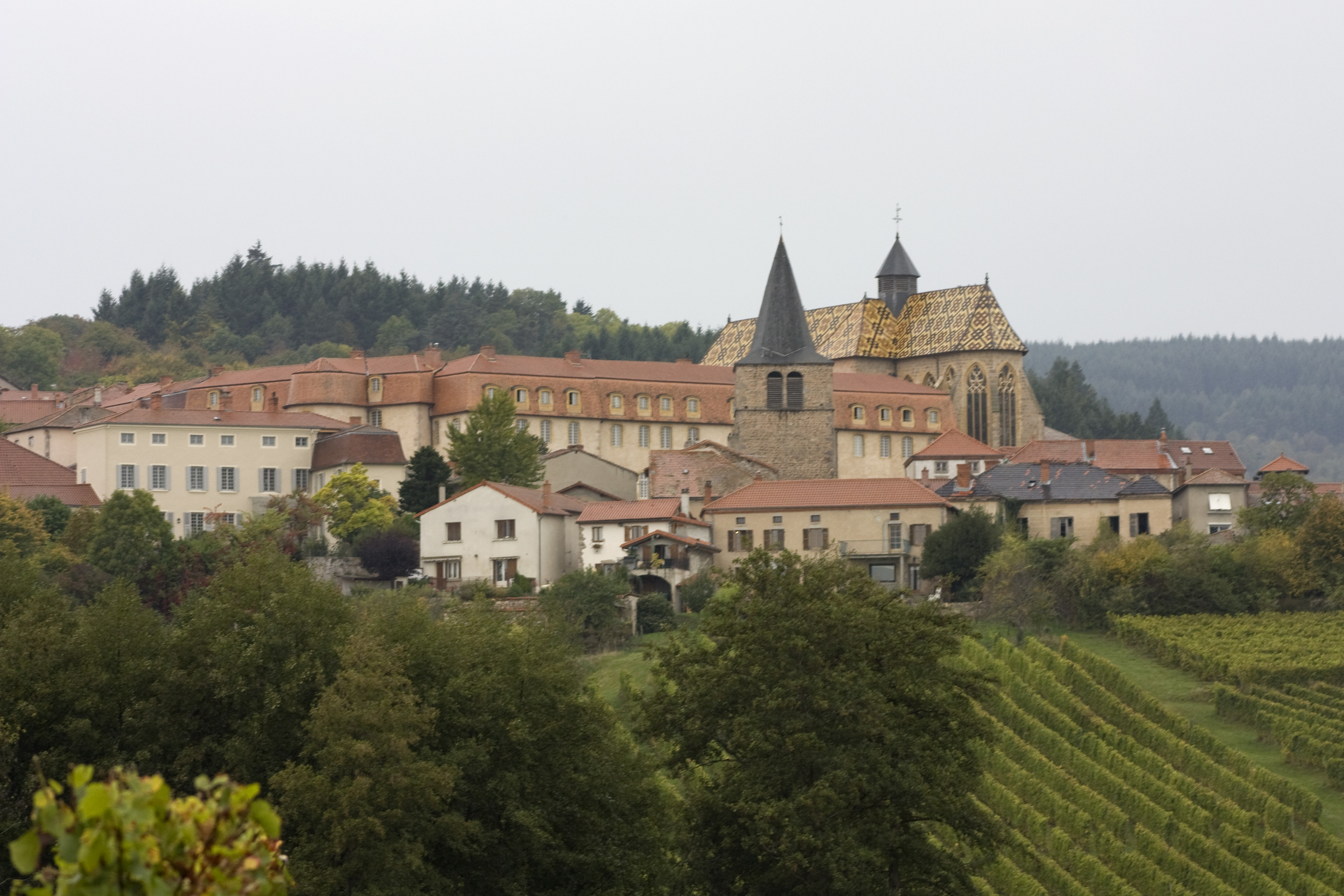
- Priory and surrounding buildings

- Coat of arms
- Location of Ambierle
- Location within France Location within Auvergne-Rhône-Alpes
- Coordinates: 46°06′19″N 3°53′47″E
- Country: France
- Region: Auvergne-Rhône-Alpes
- Department: Loire
- Arrondissement: Roanne
- Canton: Renaison
- Intercommunality: Roannais Agglomération

Government
  - Mayor (2020–2026): Pascal Muzart
- Area^{1}: 30.76 km^{2} (11.88 sq mi)
- Highest elevation: 843 m (2,766 ft)
- Lowest elevation: 297 m (974 ft)
- Population (2023): 1,865
  - Density: 60.63/km^{2} (157.0/sq mi)
- Time zone: UTC+01:00 (CET)
  - Summer (DST): UTC+02:00 (CEST)
- INSEE/Postal code: 42003 /42820
- ^{1} French Land Register data, which excludes lakes, ponds, glaciers > 1 km^{2} (0.386 sq mi or 247 acres) and river estuaries.

Ambierle (French pronunciation: [ɑ̃bjɛʁl]) is a commune in the Loire department in central France.

== Population ==
Historical population
Year	Pop.	±% p.a.
1968	1,455	—
1975	1,422	−0.33%
1982	1,592	+1.63%
1990	1,763	+1.28%
1999	1,728	−0.22%
2007	1,840	+0.79%
2012	1,806	−0.37%
2017	1,915	+1.18%
2023	1,865	−0.44%
Source: INSEE

== See also ==
- Communes of the Loire department
