= St. Mary's University (Galveston, Texas) =

Catholic seminary and college in Texas, United States, now closed

- Type: Private
- Active: 1855–1922
- Founder: Jean Marie Odin
- Affiliations: Roman Catholic
- Location: Galveston, Texas, United States

St. Mary's University was the first Catholic seminary and college in Texas. Founded in Galveston in 1855, it closed in 1922 when its operator, the Jesuit Order, decided to concentrate their efforts on universities in New Orleans and Mobile, Alabama. In 1926 its charter was transferred to St. Mary's Seminary in La Porte, Texas (now in Houston).

== History ==
St. Mary's University was opened by Jean Marie Odin, Bishop of Galveston, in 1855. The University was founded as a seminary for the training and education of native-born men into the priesthood. However, to help make the seminary self-supporting, and at the same time provide a Catholic education for the youth in the area, Odin decided to include in the project a college for boys. The institution was originally placed under the direction of the Oblates of Mary Immaculate. Construction of the university began in 1853 and a three-story building was completed in November 1854. The initial enrollment of St. Mary's University was sixty traditional college students and a handful of seminarians. The school formally opened on January 1, 1855 and in 1856 the Texas legislature granted St. Mary's a charter as a university, making it the first state-chartered institution for higher education in Texas. The number of traditional college students continued to grow, but the number of seminary students remained stagnant, so that by 1860 the seminary had ceased to function. By the early part of the 20th century the Jesuits had taken over the operation of the university. However, in 1922, on the order of Father Norbert de Boynes, the university was closed when the Jesuits decided to leave Galveston in order to focus their resources on the two largest universities in the Province of New Orleans.
