= Archdiocese of Galveston–Houston =

Latin Catholic jurisdiction in the US

Archdiocese of Galveston–Houston Archidiœcesis Galvestoniensis–Houstoniensis
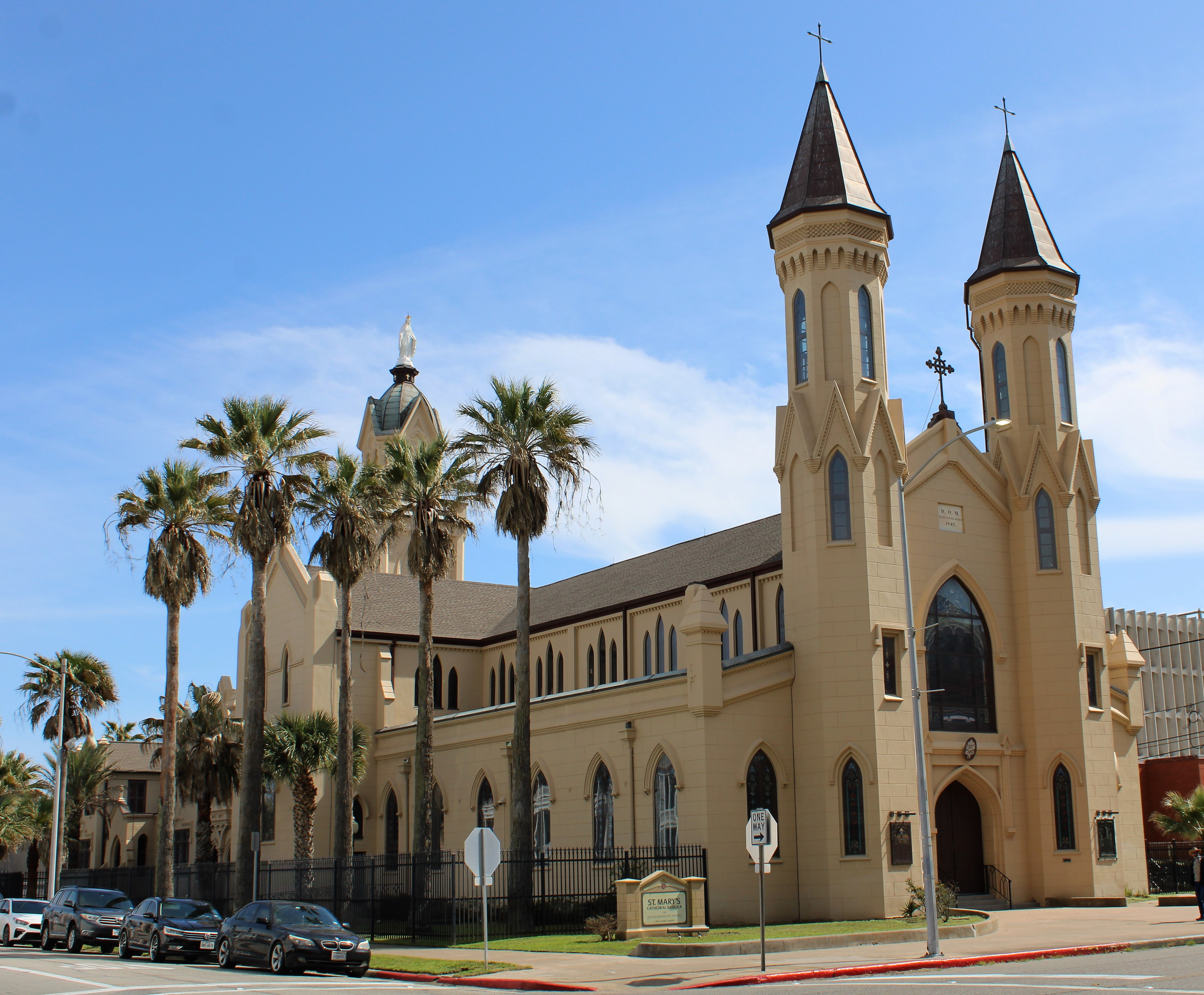
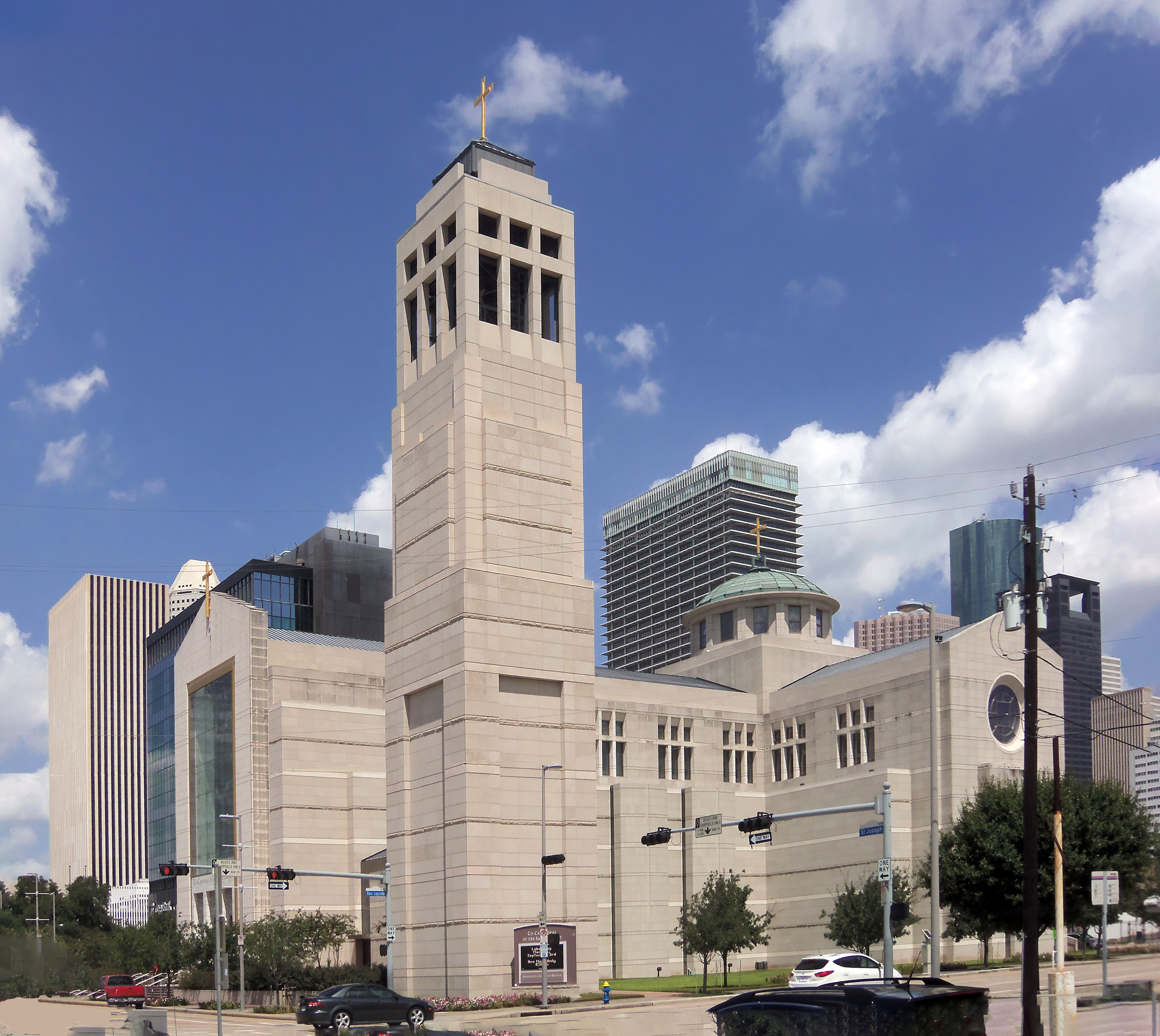
- St. Mary's Cathedral Basilica, Galveston Sacred Heart Co-Cathedral, Houston

- Coat of arms

Location
- Country: United States
- Territory: Southeastern Texas (Counties of Galveston, Harris, Austin, Brazoria, Fort Bend, Grimes, Montgomery, San Jacinto, Walker and Waller)
- Deaneries: 13
- Headquarters: Houston, Texas
- Coordinates: 29°45′02″N 95°22′04″W

Statistics
- Area: 23,257 km^{2} (8,980 sq mi)
- Population: Total; Catholics: (as of 2022); 7,430,555; 1,804,100 (27.1%)
- Parishes: 146
- Schools: 59

Information
- Denomination: Catholic
- Sui iuris church: Latin Church
- Rite: Roman Rite
- Established: May 4, 1847
- Cathedral: St. Mary Cathedral Basilica (Galveston)
- Co-cathedral: Co-Cathedral of the Sacred Heart (Houston)
- Patron saint: Our Lady of the Immaculate Conception
- Secular priests: 418

Current leadership
- Pope: Leo XIV
- Archbishop: Joe S. Vásquez
- Auxiliary Bishops: Italo Dell'Oro
- Vicar General: Italo Dell'Oro
- Bishops emeritus: Daniel DiNardo

Map
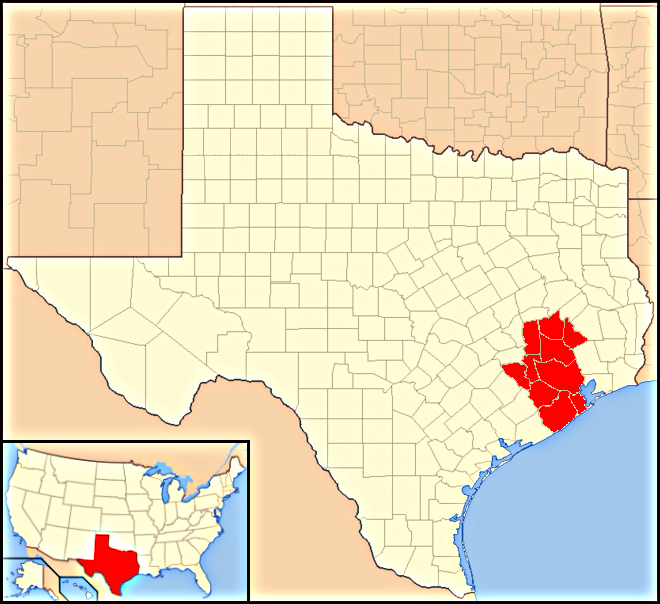

Website
- www.archgh.org

The Archdiocese of Galveston–Houston (Latin: Archidiœcesis Galvestoniensis–Houstoniensis) is an archdiocese of the Catholic Church in the United States. The archdiocese covers a portion of Southeast Texas, and is the metropolitan see of the ecclesiastical province covering east Texas. The archdiocese was erected in 2004, having been a diocese since 1959 and the "Diocese of Galveston" since 1847. The mother church of the archdiocese is St. Mary Cathedral Basilica in Galveston; the co-cathedral is the Co-Cathedral of the Sacred Heart in Houston. The archbishop is Joe Vásquez.

== Territory ==
The Archdiocese of Galveston–Houston encompasses 8,880 square miles (23,000 km^{2}) in southeastern Texas. It includes the cities of Houston, and Galveston, along with the following counties: Galveston, Harris, Brazoria, Fort Bend, Grimes, Montgomery, San Jacinto, Walker, Waller and Washington.

The ecclesiastical province of Galveston-Houston contains the following suffragan dioceses in south and east Texas:

- Diocese of Austin
- Diocese of Beaumont
- Diocese of Brownsville
- Diocese of Corpus Christi
- Diocese of Tyler
- Diocese of Victoria in Texas

== History ==
=== 1756 to 1847 ===
The first Catholic presence in the Galveston area came with the founding of the Spanish Mission Nuestra Señora de la Luz on Galveston Bay in 1756. It was abandoned in 1771. The end of Mexican War of Independence in 1821 put present day Texas under Mexican control.

With the ending of the Texas Revolution in 1836, Mexico ceded control of its Texas province to the Republic of Texas. The first Catholic church in Houston, St. Vincent's Church, opened in 1839. That same year, the Vatican removed Texas from the Mexican Diocese of Linares o Nueva León and created the prefecture apostolic of Texas, covering the entire republic. Pope Gregory XVI named John Timon as the prefect of Texas.

In 1841, Gregory XVI upgraded the prefecture to the Vicariate Apostolic of Texas, naming Jean-Marie Odin as the vicar apostolic. In 1842, Odin opened the first Catholic church in Galveston. During his tenure, the Texan Congress returned several churches that had been secularized by the Mexican Government. Odin opened several schools and invited the Ursuline nuns as the first religious community in Texas to operate them. In December 1845, the Republic of Texas was accepted into the United States as the State of Texas.

=== 1847 to 1862 ===
Pope Pius IX in 1847 elevated the Vicariate Apostolic of Texas to the Diocese of Galveston, designating it a suffragan diocese of the Archdiocese of Baltimore. St. Mary's Church in Galveston was designated as the cathedral. The pope named Odin as the first bishop of Galveston. In 1850, the Vatican transferred the Diocese of Galveston to the Archdiocese of New Orleans.

Odin recruited the Brothers of Mary and Oblates of Mary to operate St. Mary's University at Galveston, which he established in 1854. He also visited remote parts of Texas, and twice traveled to Europe to recruit priests and obtain material help for the diocese. By the end of his tenure, Odin had increased the number of priests to 84 and the number of churches to 50; he has been called the father of the modern Catholic Church in Texas. In 1861, Odin became Archbishop of New Orleans.

=== 1862 to 1892 ===
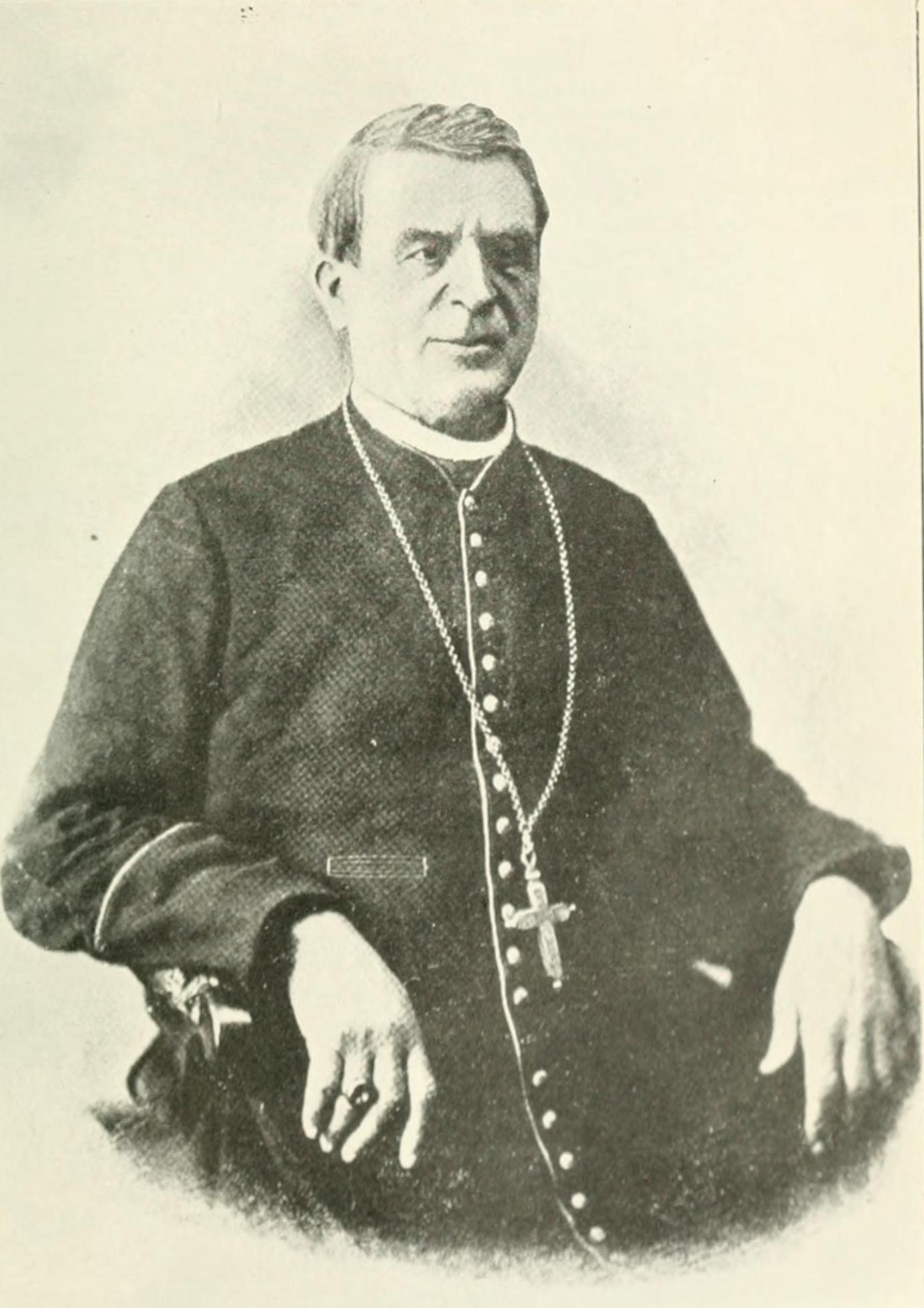
Bishop Dubuis (1922)

The second bishop of Galveston was Claude Marie Dubuis, named by Pius IX in 1862. After the end of the American Civil War in 1865, Dubuis established additional parishes, hospitals and schools in the Diocese. In 1866, cholera broke out in the diocese. Unable to persuade an American religious congregations to come to Galveston, Dubuis persuaded the Sisters of Divine Providence from Saint-Jean-de-Bassel in France to come instead.

During his tenure as bishop, Dubuis brought almost seventy religious congregations into Texas. On one trip to Europe, he secured the services of the Congregation of the Resurrection to minister to the Polish community in Texas. Dubuis founded the Sisters of Charity of the Incarnate Word, which played a significant role in healthcare services in Texas. In 1873, the Sisters of Notre Dame de Namur established the Academy of the Sacred Heart for girls in Waco.

By 1878, Dubuis was in bad health. That same year, Pope Leo XIII named Nicolaus Gallagher of the Diocese of Columbus as the apostolic administrator to operate the diocese. Dubuis left Texas for Europe in 1882 without resigning as bishop, never to return to the United States. Dupuis' refusal to resign prevented the pope from naming a new bishop for Galveston.

In 1882, Leo XIII named Gallagher instead as the Titular Bishop of Canopus. For the next ten years, in an unusual arrangement, Gallagher served as apostolic administrator in Galveston without a diocesan bishop. In 1886, he opened the first Catholic school for African American children in Texas. In 1890, the Vatican erected the Diocese of Dallas, taking territory from the Diocese of Galveston.

=== 1892 to 1959 ===
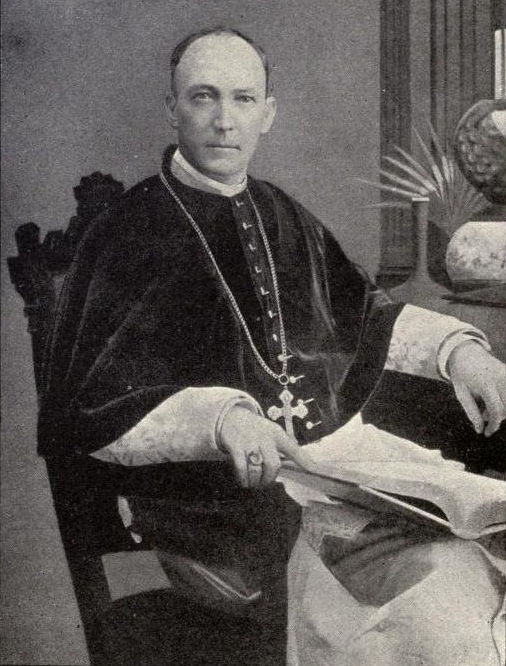
Bishop Gallagher (1904)

In 1892, after Dubuis finally resigned as bishop of Galveston, Leo XIII appointed Gallagher as the next bishop. At the beginning of his tenure, the diocese had 30,000 Catholics and 50 parishes. After the 1900 Galveston hurricane devastated the city, Gallagher rebuilt all the destroyed Catholic institutions. Gallagher introduced into the diocese the Sisters of Charity of the Incarnate Word, the Jesuits, the Basilian Fathers, the Paulist Fathers and the Sisters of the Third Order of St. Dominic. These orders founded churches, schools, and hospitals throughout the diocese. He established St. Mary's Seminary at La Porte in 1901, and Good Shepherd Home for Delinquent Girls at Houston in 1914. Gallagher also erected parishes for Spanish-speaking Catholics in Austin and Houston, and for African-Americans in Houston, Beaumont, and Port Arthur. By the time of Gallagher's death, the diocese had a population of 70,000 Catholics and 120 parishes. Gallagher died in 1918.

Pope Benedict XV named Christopher Byrne from the Archdiocese of Saint Louis as the fourth bishop of Galveston in 1918. He ordained about 130 priests and received several hundred people into religious communities. In 1923, the diocese purchased what came to be known as the Bishop's Palace in Galveston. In 1926, the Vatican transferred the Diocese of Galveston from the Archdiocese of New Orleans to the new Archdiocese of San Antonio. The diocese increased from 70,000 to 200,000 parishioners during Byrne's tenure, and the number of schools from 51 to over 100. In 1936, Byrne helped organize the centennial celebration of Texan independence from Mexico, holding an open-air mass at the San Jacinto Battlefield near Houston. In 1947, the Vatican erected the Diocese of Austin, taking territory from the Diocese of Galveston. That same year, Pope Pius XII named Wendelin Joseph Nold of Dallas coadjutor bishop in Galveston to assist Byrne. When Byrne died in 1950, Nold succeed him as bishop of Galveston.

=== 1959 to 2004 ===
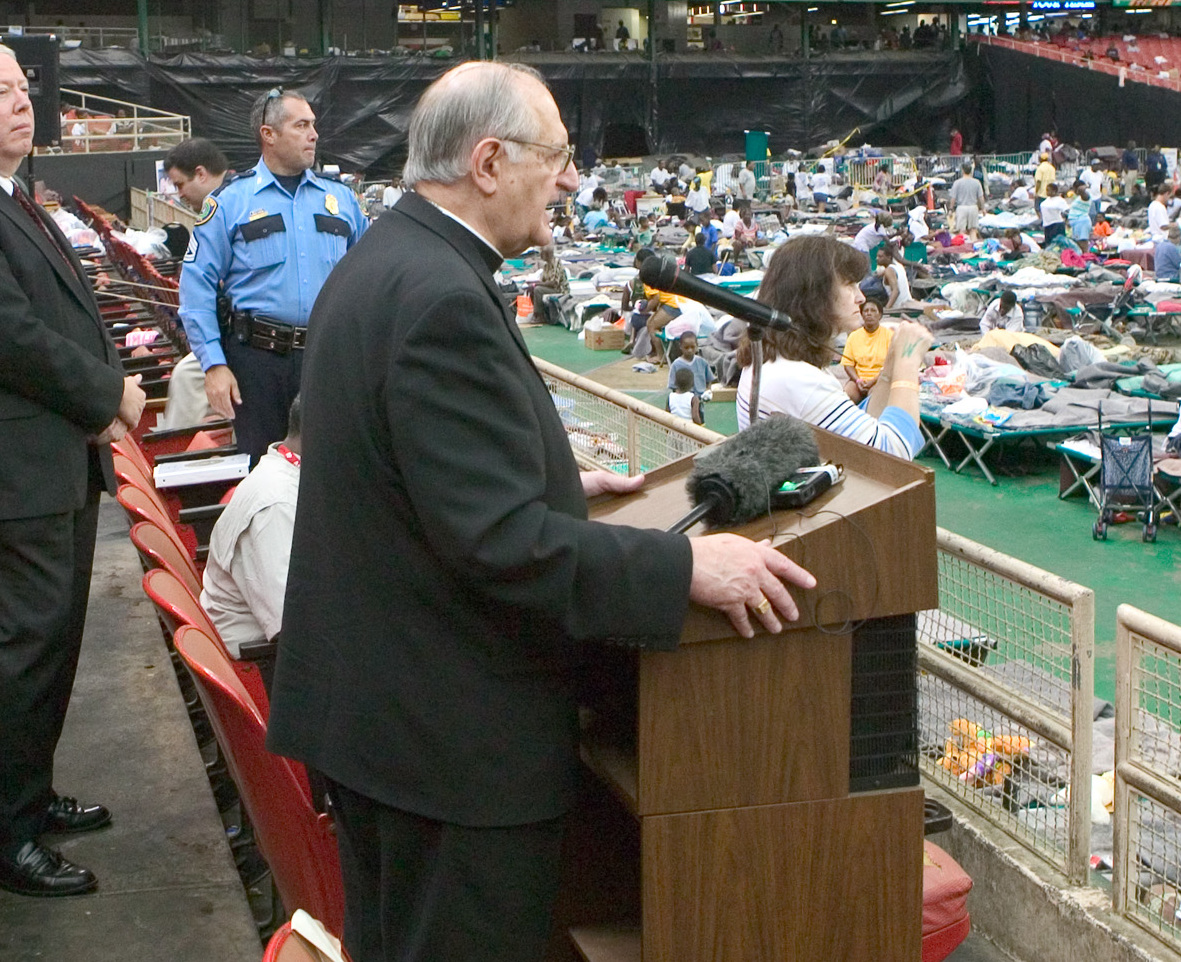
Archbishop Fiorenza (2005)

In recognition of the explosive growth of the city of Houston, Nold in 1959 recommended to Pope John XXIII the creation of a co-cathedral in that city. Later that year, Sacred Heart Church in Houston was designated a co-cathedral and the Diocese of Galveston was renamed the Diocese of Galveston-Houston. In September 1961, Nold ordered that all Catholic schools in the diocese be racially integrated. During his tenure, Nold established 47 parishes and 14 missions, as well as several schools. After Nold went blind in 1963, Pope Paul VI named Bishop John Morkovsky from the Diocese of Amarillo as coadjutor bishop.

While coadjutor bishop, Morkovsky in 1964 he founded the diocesan newspaper The Texas Catholic Herald. He established the first diocesan mission in Guatemala City in 1966. That same year, the Vatican erected the Diocese of Beaumont with territory from Galveston-Houston. In 1968, Morkovsky established the Hospital Chaplains Corps at Houston Medical Center. When Nold retired in 1975, Morkovsky became bishop of Galveston-Houston.

During his tenure as bishop, Morkovsky established African American and Mexican American ministries and gave special attention to low-income parishioners and Houston's large Vietnamese community. In 1979, Pope John Paul II elevated the status of St. Mary Cathedral to that of a minor basilica. In 1982, the Vatican erected the Diocese of Victoria, taking more territory from Galveston-Houston. Morkovsky resigned in 1984. The next bishop of Galveston-Houston was Bishop Joseph Fiorenza from the Diocese of San Angelo, named by John Paul II in 1984.

=== 2004 to present ===
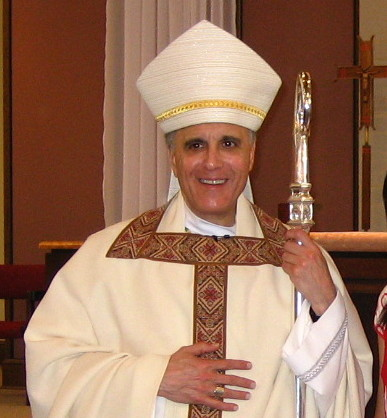
Archbishop DiNardo (2006)

On Dec. 29, 2004, John Paul II created the ecclesiastical province of Galveston–Houston and elevated the Diocese of Galveston–Houston to the Archdiocese of Galveston–Houston. The pope appointed Fiorenza, bishop of the diocese for 20 years, as the first archbishop of the new archdiocese. Two years later, Pope Benedict XVI named Bishop Daniel DiNardo from the Diocese of Sioux City as coadjutor archbishop in Galveston-Houston to assist Fiorenza. When Fiorenza retired later that year, DiNardo became archbishop.

In 2007, Benedict XVI elevated DiNardo to the rank of cardinal. Agents of Montgomery County District Attorney Brett Ligon raided the headquarters of the archdiocese in November 2018 to seize records of sexual abuses allegations against clergy in the archdiocese. In January 2019, Archbishop DiNardo released a list of names of 40 priests from the archdiocese with credible allegations of sexual misconduct over the previous 70 years.

In December 2020, Manuel La Rosa-Lopez pleaded guilty to two counts of indecency with a child and was sentenced to ten years in state prison. The crimes took place at Sacred Heart Catholic Church in Conroe between 1997 and 2001; the victims were an underage boy and girl. One of the victims reported the crimes in 2018 and La Rosa-Lopez was arrested then.

In 2021, DiNardo announced, in accordance to the apostolic letter Traditionis custodes, only certain parishes would be allowed to celebrate the Tridentine mass in the archdiocese. The tabernacle was stolen from St. Bartholomew the Apostle Catholic Church in Katy, Texas, in May 2022. Although a suspected was apprehended by the Katy Police Department, neither the tabernacle nor its contents was recovered.

In January 2025, DiNardo retired as archbishop of Galveston-Houston; Pope Francis replaced him with Bishop Joe Vásquez from the Diocese of Austin. Several churches and schools in Houston held memorial services in July 2025 for the victims of the Texas Hill Country Flood that killed over 100 people.

== Bishops ==
=== Prefects of Texas ===
John Timon, C.M. (1840–1847)

=== Vicars Apostolic of Texas ===
Jean-Marie Odin, C.M. (1841–1847)

=== Bishops of Galveston ===
1. Jean-Marie Odin, C.M. (1847–1861), appointed Archbishop of New Orleans
2. Claude Marie Dubuis (1862–1892)
3. Nicolaus Aloysius Gallagher (1892–1918)
4. Christopher Edward Byrne (1918–1950)
5. Wendelin Joseph Nold (1950–1959)

(Aloysius Joseph Meyer, C.M. was appointed apostolic administrator in 1881 but it did not take effect. Bishop Gallagher, already listed above, became administrator.)

=== Bishops of Galveston–Houston ===
1. Wendelin Joseph Nold (1959–1975)
2. John Louis Morkovsky (1975–1984)
3. Joseph Fiorenza (1984–2004)

=== Archbishops of Galveston–Houston ===
1. Joseph Fiorenza (2004–2006)
2. Daniel Cardinal Dinardo (2006–2025)
3. Joe S. Vásquez (2025–present)

=== Coadjutor bishops ===
- Pierre Dufal, C.S.C. (1878–1879), resigned (did not succeed to see)
- John Louis Morkovsky (1963–1975)
- Daniel DiNardo (2003–2006), elevated to Coadjutor Archbishop in 2004; future Cardinal

=== Auxiliary bishops ===
- John E. McCarthy (1979–1985), appointed Bishop of Austin
- Enrique San Pedro (1986–1991), appointed Coadjutor Bishop and later Bishop of Brownsville
- Curtis J. Guillory, SVD (1988–2000), appointed Bishop of Beaumont
- James Anthony Tamayo (1993–2000), appointed Bishop of Laredo
- Vincent M. Rizzotto (2001–2006)
- Joe S. Vásquez (2002–2010), appointed Bishop of Austin
- George Sheltz (2012–2021)
- Italo Dell’Oro (2021–present)

=== Other diocesan priests who became bishops ===
- John Claude Neraz, appointed Bishop of San Antonio in 1881
- John Anthony Forest, appointed Bishop of San Antonio in 1895
- Louis Joseph Reicher, appointed Bishop of Austin in 1947
- Vincent Madeley Harris, appointed Bishop of Beaumont in 1966 and later Bishop of Austin
- John Joseph Cassata, appointed Auxiliary Bishop of Dallas-Fort Worth in 1968 and later Bishop of Fort Worth
- Patrick Fernandez Flores, appointed Auxiliary Bishop of San Antonio in 1970 and later Bishop of El Paso and Archbishop of San Antonio
- Bernard James Ganter, appointed Bishop of Tulsa in 1972
- Oscar Cantú, appointed Auxiliary Bishop of San Antonio in 2008, later Bishop of Las Cruces and Bishop of San Jose
- Brendan John Cahill, appointed Bishop of Victoria in Texas in 2015

== Coat of arms ==
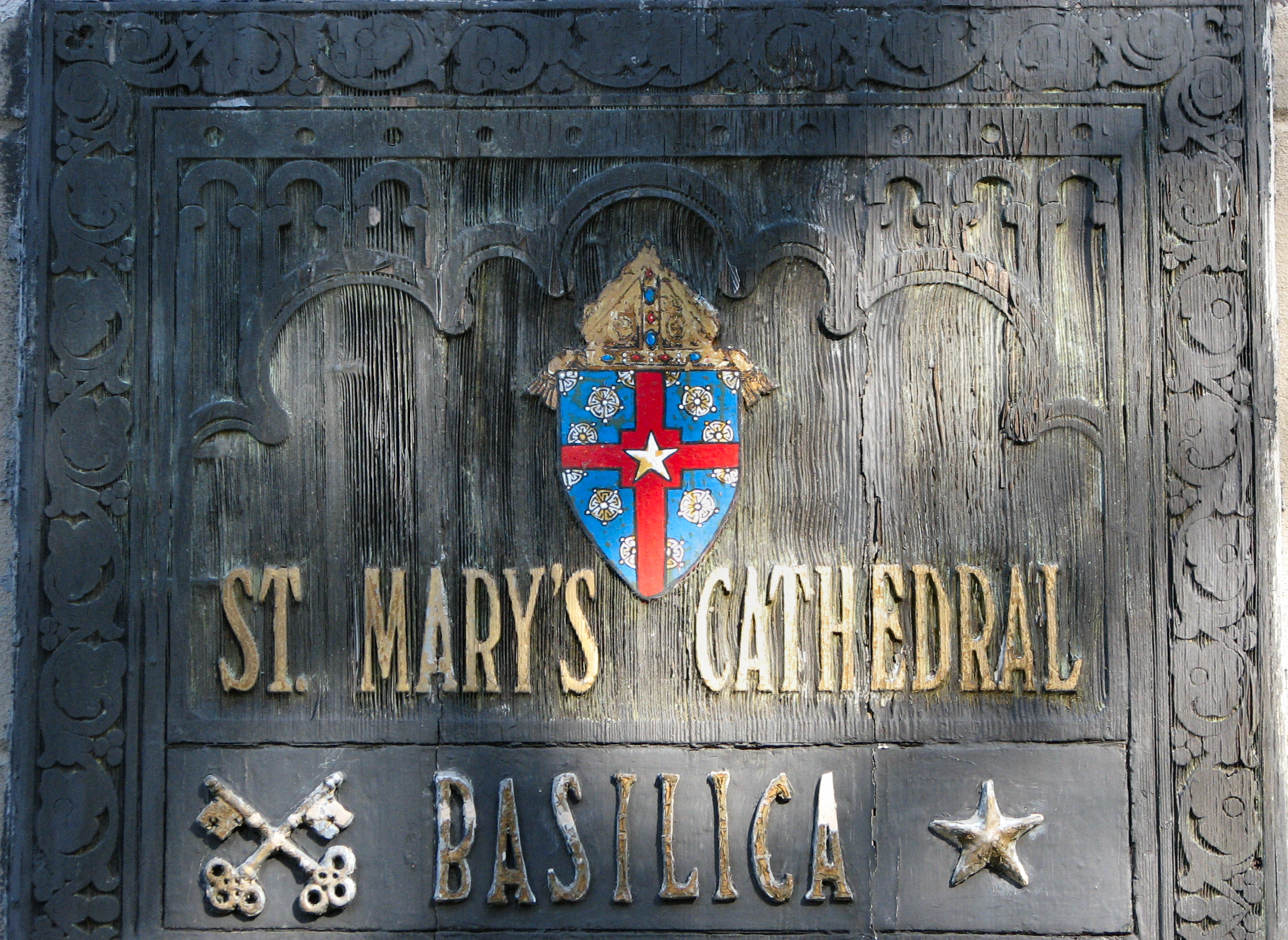
Coat of Arms as displayed on St. Mary Cathedral Basilica

The coat of arms of the Archdiocese of Galveston–Houston has a blue shield that contains the following elements:

- Silver and white roses, representing Mary, mother of Jesus, in her title as the Mystical Rose
- A red cross, representing the Catholic faith
- A silver star, representing Texas as the Lone Star State
- A bishop's mitre on the top

== Statistics ==
As of 2022, approximately 1.8 million Catholics lived within the archdiocese, equaling 23% of the total population. It was the largest archdiocese in Texas and the fifth largest in the United States. The archdiocese had 146 parishes served by approximately 428 priests (186 diocesan, 185 religious, and 57 other) and 399 permanent deacons.

== Education ==
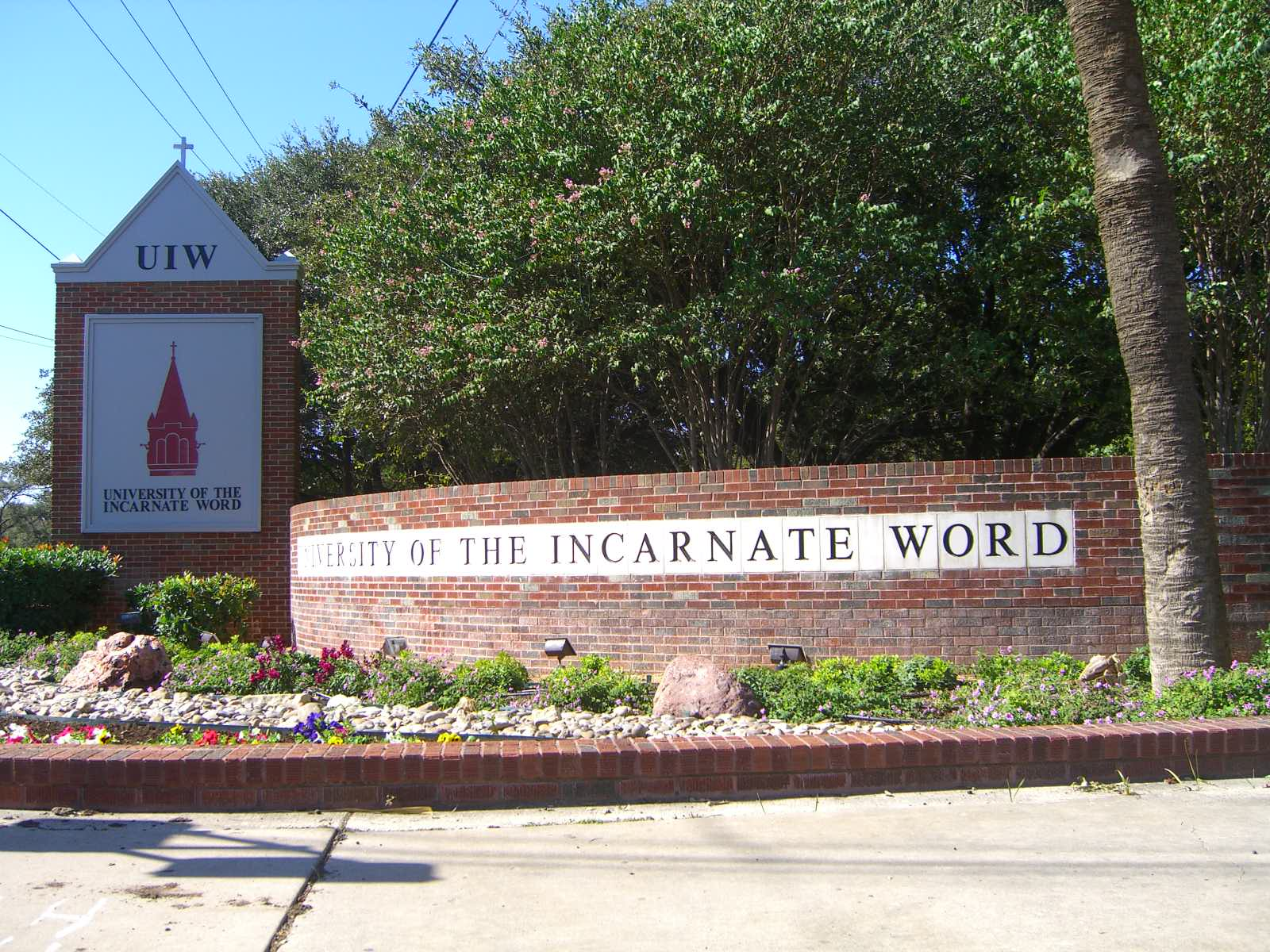
University of the Incarnate Word, San Antonio, Texas (2006)

As of 2018, the archdiocesan school system was the largest private school system in Texas. The system had 59 schools, with an enrollment of approximately 19,500 students.

In 2005, the school system had 17,000 students prior to Hurricane Katrina; the hurricane meant that an additional 1,700 attended Houston-area Catholic schools. From 2005 to 2012 total enrollment was consistently around 18,000. Several new schools were established at the time. In 2012, the school system operated 13 in central Houston; that year they had 2,000 students, with about 66% of the students being Catholic. The growth in Houston's Catholic school system contrasted with Catholic schooling systems in many other parts of the United States, which faced steep enrollment declines.

== Landmark structures ==
The Archdiocese of Galveston–Houston contains many landmark structures. The most prominent structure is St. Mary Cathedral Basilica, the mother church of Texas. It was one of the few buildings and the only church to survive the 1900 Galveston Storm. Other landmarks in the archdiocese include:

- 1887 Bishop's Palace in Galveston
- former 1912 Sacred Heart Co-Cathedral in Houston
- Annunciation Church in Houston, one of the oldest churches in Texas.
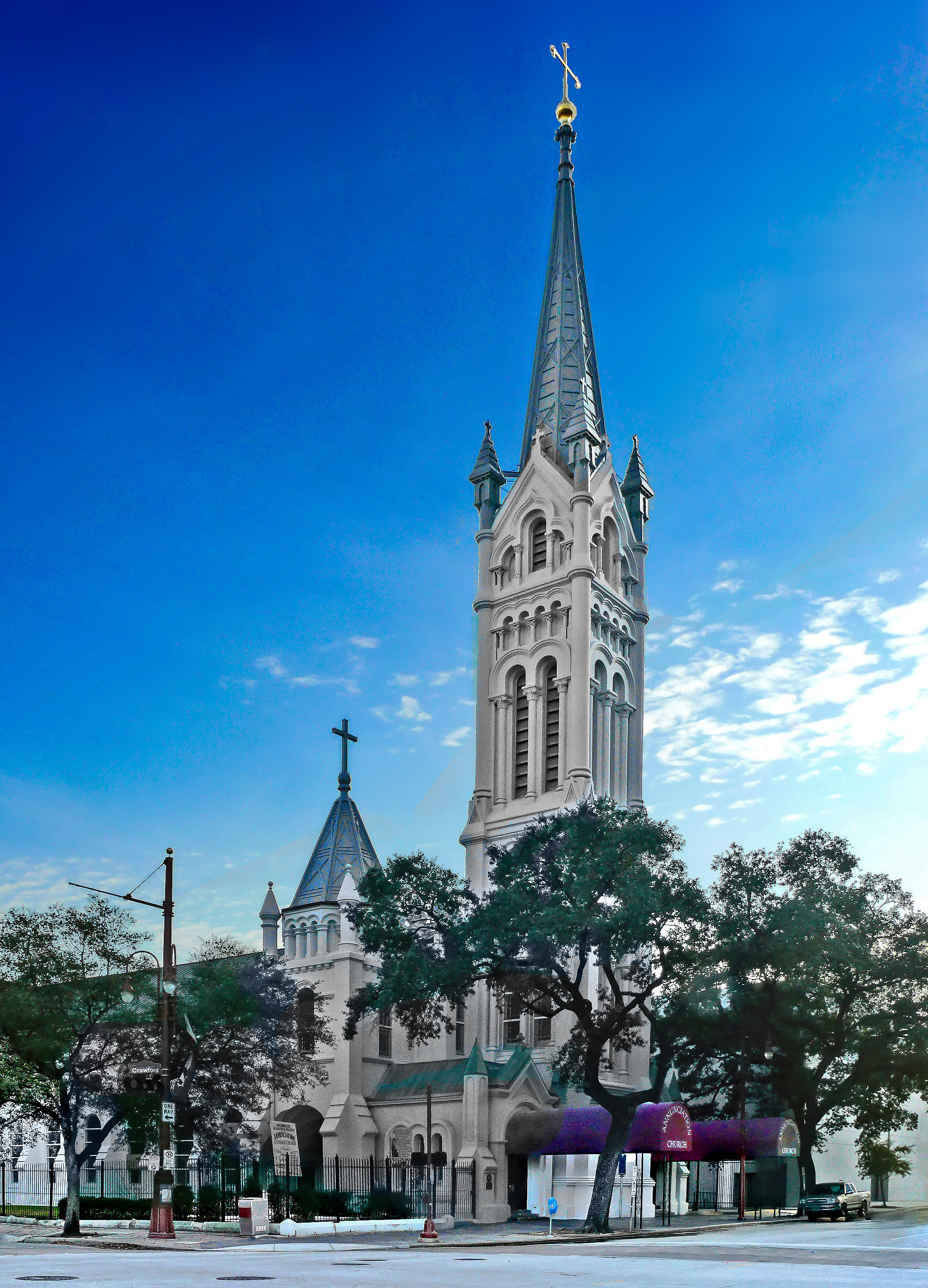
Annunciation Church in Downtown Houston

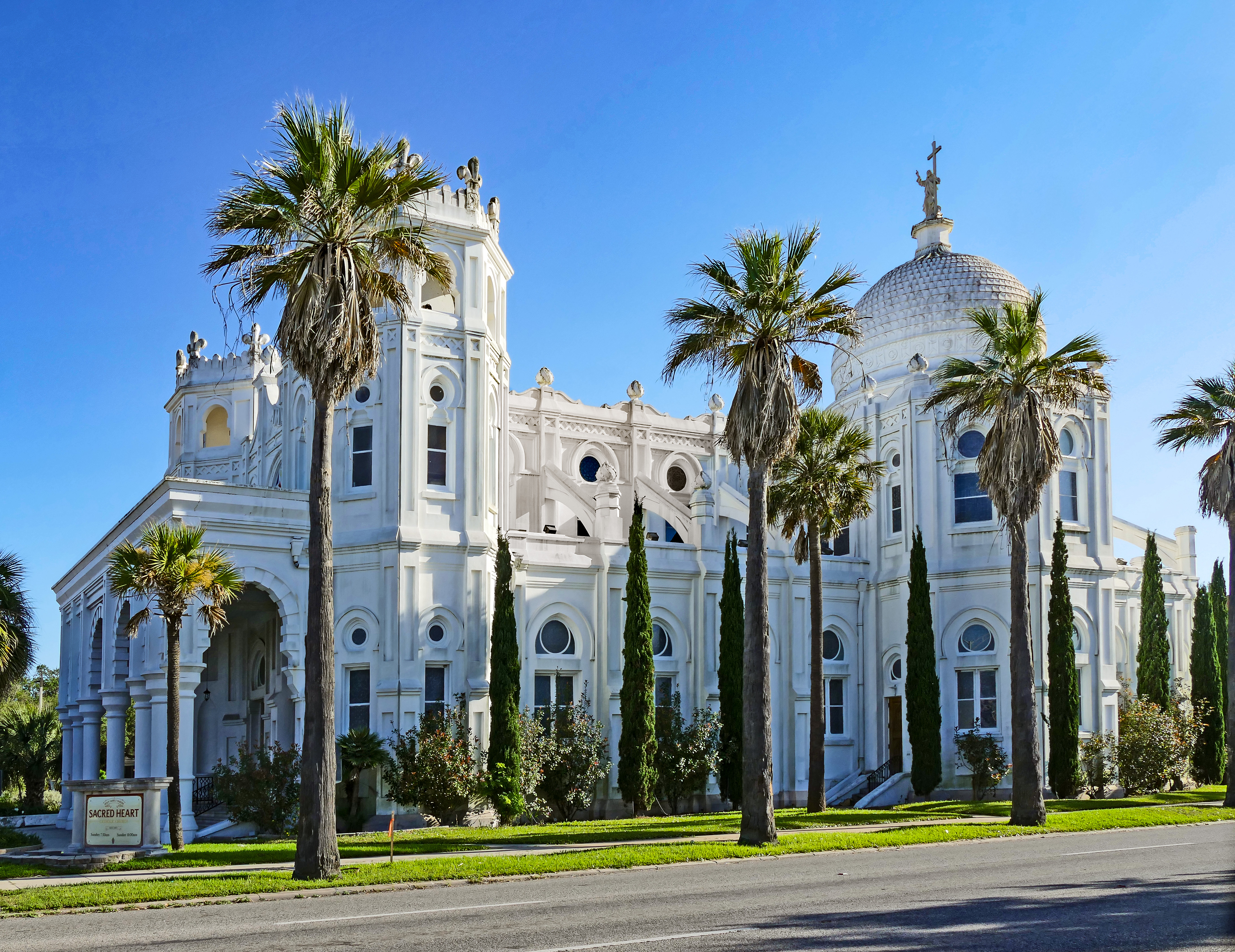
Sacred Heart Church in Galveston

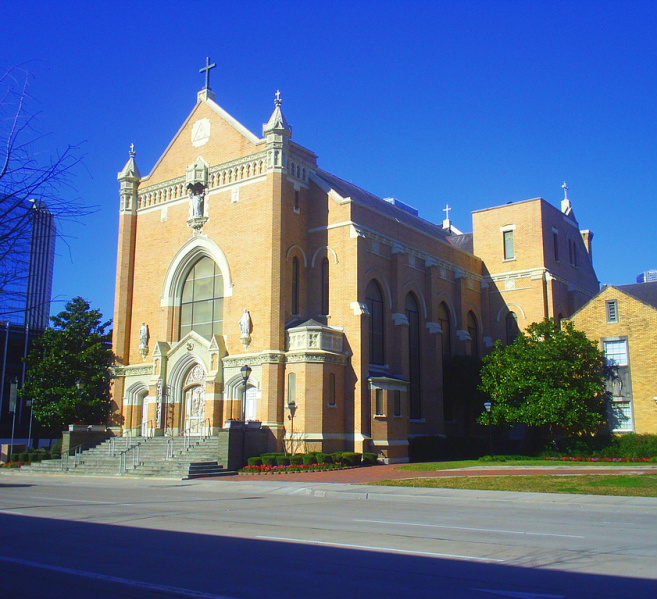
Former Sacred Heart Co-Cathedral in downtown Houston

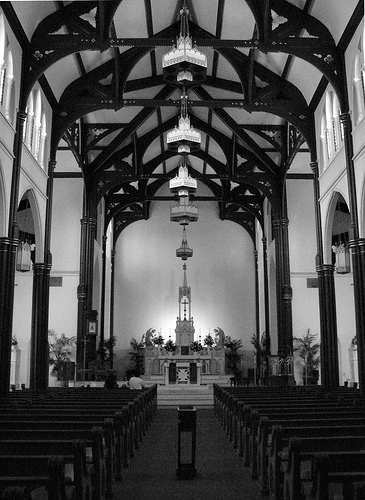
Interior of St. Mary Cathedral Basilica in downtown Galveston

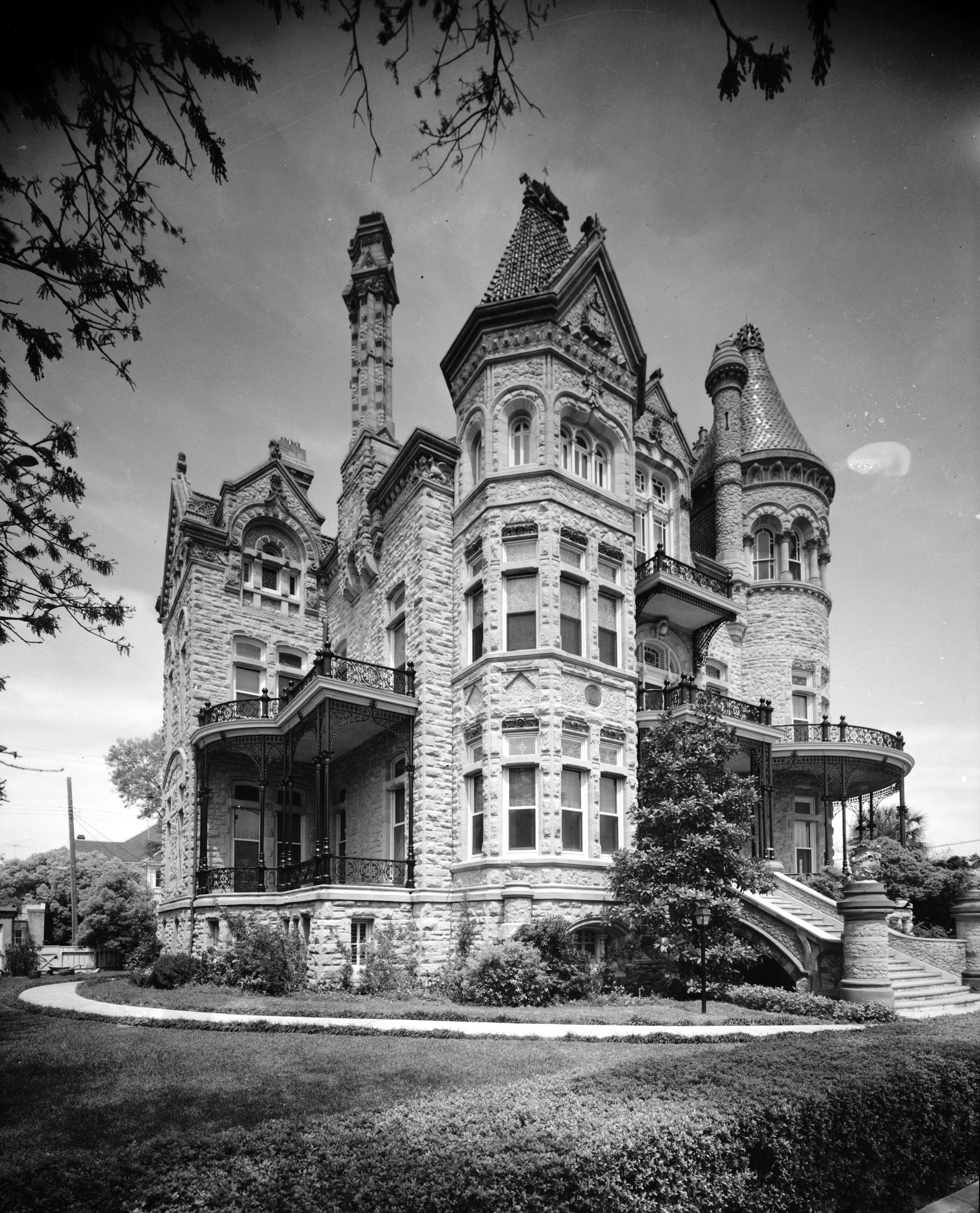
Bishop's palace in 1886 in Galveston

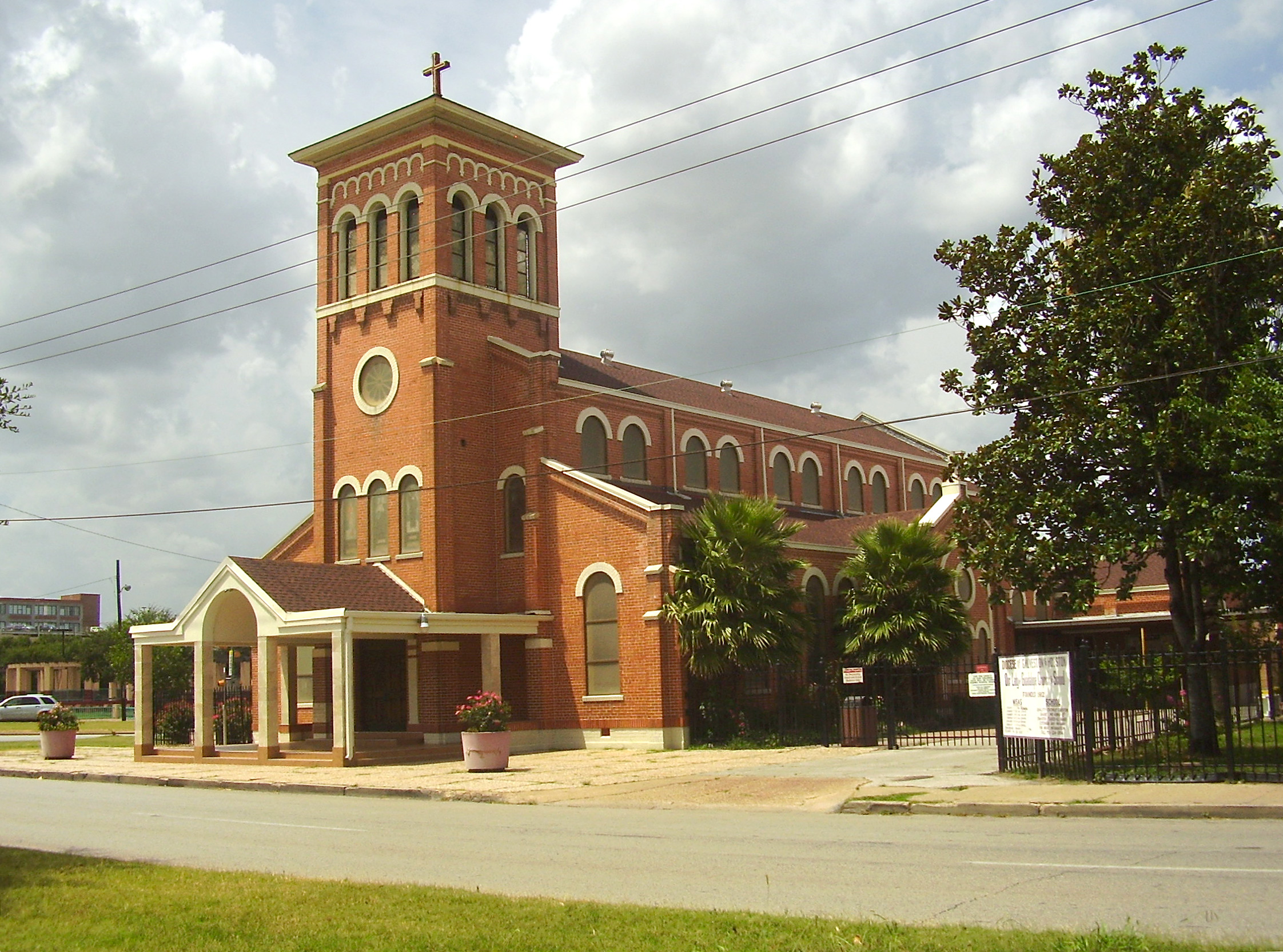
Our Lady of Guadalupe Catholic Church in Second Ward, Houston

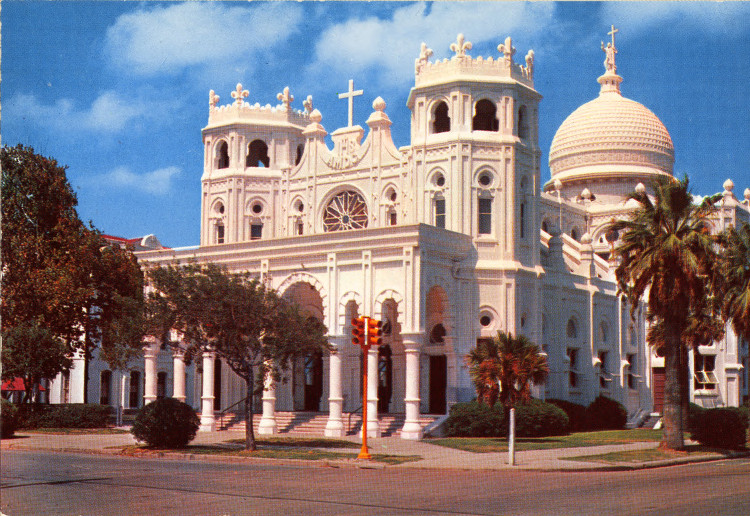
Sacred Heart Church in Galveston

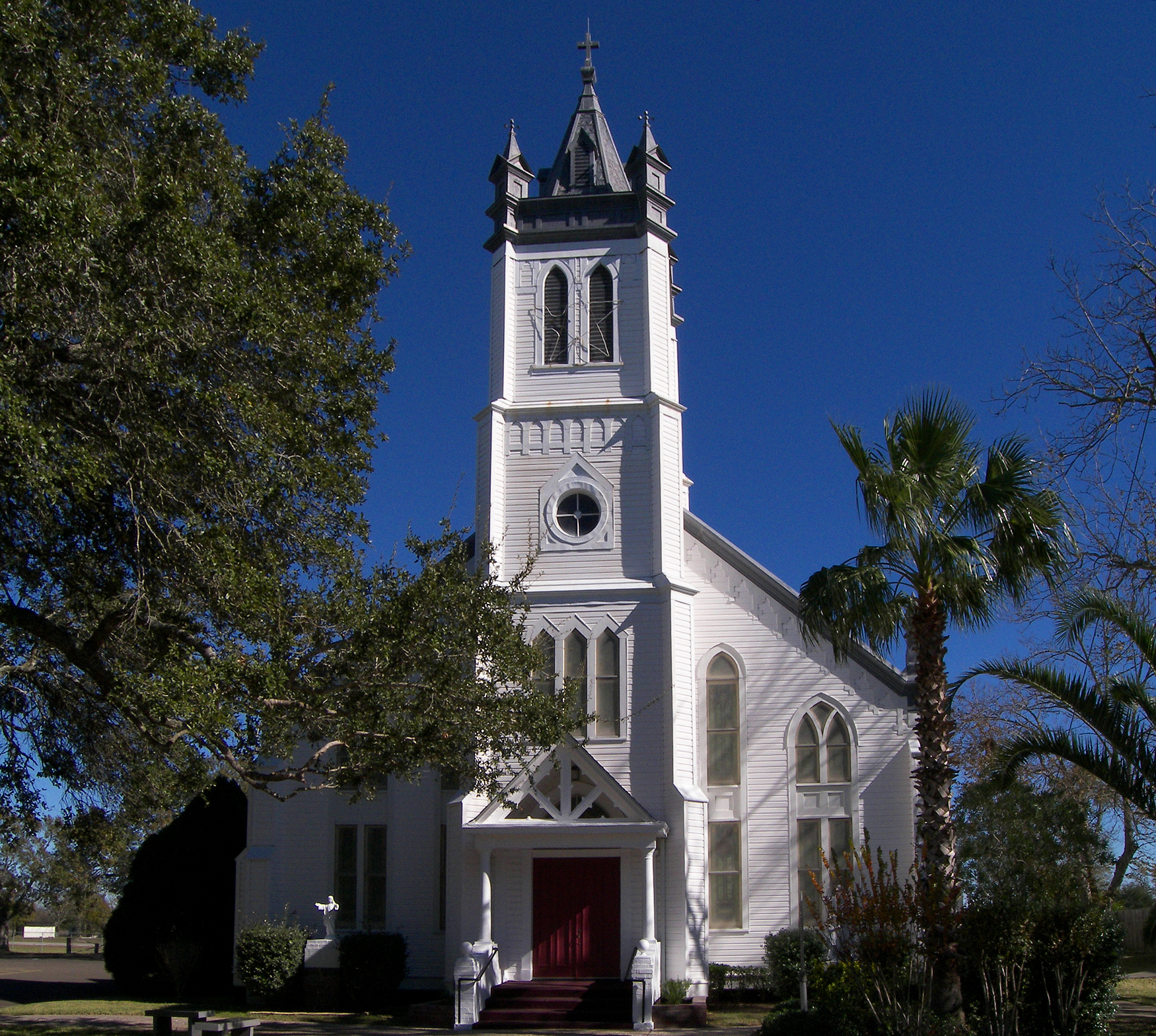
Guardian Angel Church in Wallis

== Suffragan dioceses ==
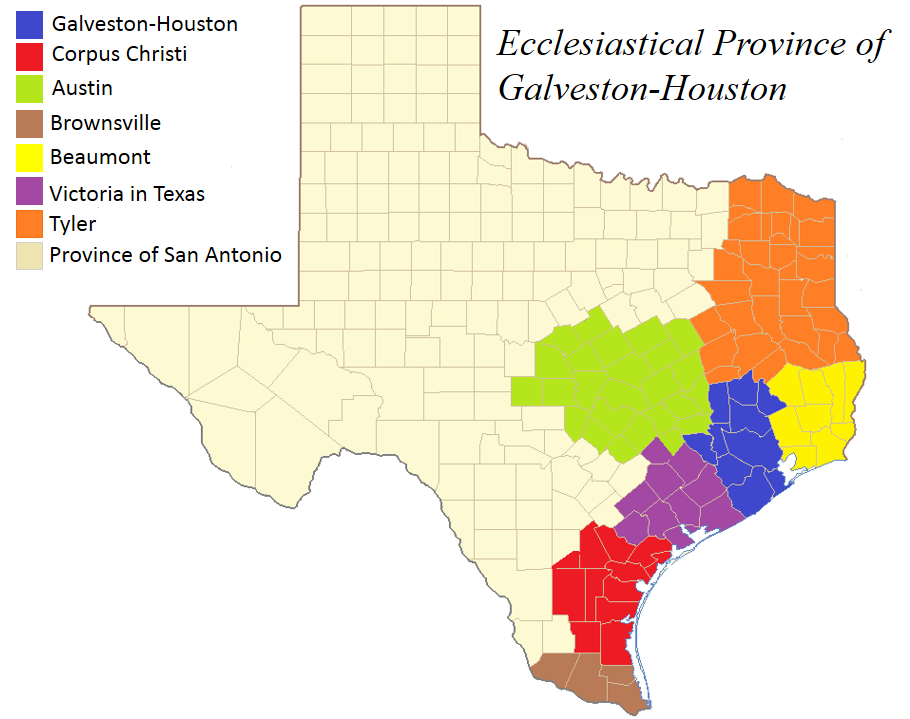
Ecclesiastical Province of Galveston–Houston

- Diocese Of Corpus Christi
- Diocese of Austin
- Diocese of Brownsville
- Diocese of Beaumont
- Diocese of Victoria
- Diocese of Tyler
