= John Timon =

American Catholic bishop (1797–1867)

His Excellency, The Right Reverend John Timon. C.M.
- Bishop of Buffalo
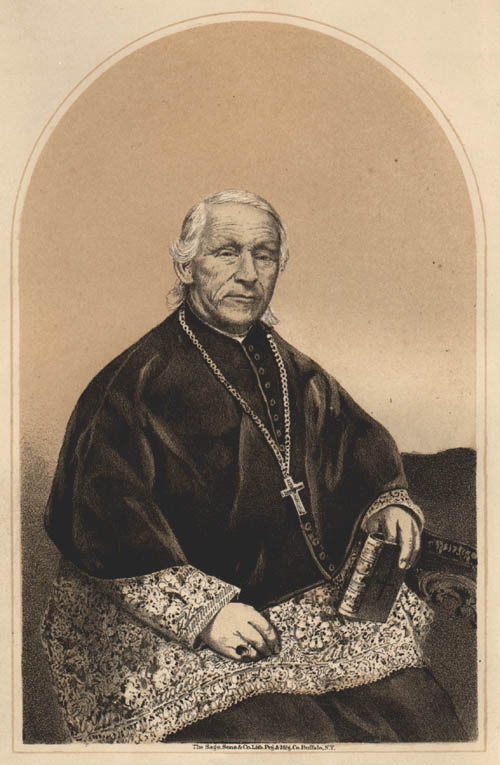
- Church: Roman Catholic Church
- See: Diocese of Buffalo
- In office: April 23, 1847 – April 16, 1867
- Successor: Stephen V. Ryan
- Previous post: Prefect apostolic of the Republic of Texas (1840 to 1847)

Orders
- Ordination: September 23, 1826 by Joseph Rosati
- Consecration: April 23, 1847 by John Hughes

Personal details
- Born: February 12, 1797 Conewago, Pennsylvania, US
- Died: April 16, 1867 (aged 70) Buffalo, New York, US
- Education: St. Mary of the Barrens Seminary
- Motto: Sub umbra alarum tuarum (Under the shadow of your wings)

John Timon, C.M. (February 12, 1797 – April 16, 1867) was an American Catholic prelate who served as the first bishop of Buffalo in New York State from 1847 to 1867.

Timon previously served as prefect apostolic of the Republic of Texas from 1840 to 1847. He founded the Brothers of the Holy Infancy and was a member of the Vincentians.

== Biography ==
=== Early life ===
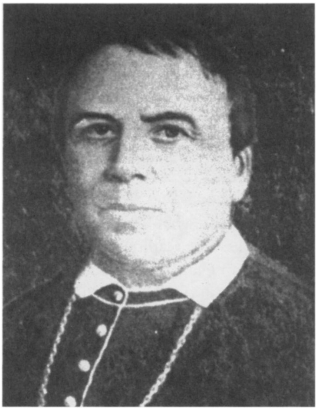
Archbishop Jean-Mari Odin

John Timon was born in Conewago, Pennsylvania on February 12, 1797, to James Timon and Margaret Leddy Timon, immigrants from County Cavan in the Kingdom of Ireland. In 1803, the family moved to Baltimore, Maryland, where James Timon started a dry goods store. In 1811, John Timon was enrolled in St. Mary's College in Baltimore. After graduation he worked in the family dry goods business. In 1818, the family moved to Louisville, Kentucky. They relocated a year later to St. Louis, Missouri.

A financial panic in 1823 ruined the family finances. Timon was also shaken by the death of a young woman he loved. As he later said, the panic made him think about what was really important to him and he decided to enter the priesthood. That same year, he enrolled at the St. Mary of the Barrens Seminary in Perryville, Missouri, where he studied philosophy and theology. One of his professors was the Reverend Jean-Marie Odin, later bishop of Galveston. Timon himself taught English and the natural sciences.

In 1824, Timon accompanied Odin on a missionary trip through Texas and then Arkansas. This trip included many nights sleeping on floors, days traveling through rough terrain, and patience with prejudice from some non-Catholics. He met one host who told him that Catholics were idolaters. Timon asked her if she worshipped a picture of US President George Washington that was hanging on her wall. She replied certainly not, that the picture was a source of inspiration. Timon then showed the woman a crucifix. He said that he did not worship the crucifix, but instead used it to remind him of the suffering of Christ. That conversation opened a new understanding between them.

Timon professed his vows to the Vincentians order on June 10, 1825. While in Arkansas, Odin and Timon met with a group of Quapaw people, giving the two missionaries the chance to ask the Native Americans about their religious beliefs.

=== Priesthood ===
Timon was ordained into the priesthood at St. Mary of the Barrens by Bishop Joseph Rosati on September 23, 1826, for the Vincentian order. After his ordination, the Vincentians assigned Timon to teach at the seminary and perform missionary work in the communities around Cape Giradeau, Missouri, and Jackson, Missouri. In 1828, Timon was called to Jackson to visit a criminal due to be hanged the next day. The man had steadily refused any religious counseling. Entering the cell, Timon lay down on the prisoner's bed and started talking to him. By the end of his talk, the prisoner was crying and expressing remorse for his crimes. He later requested baptism before his execution.

In 1835, the Vincentians meeting in Paris appointed Timon as "visitor" (superior) of the new Vincentians province in the United States, His initial thought was to refuse the position, they persuaded him to take it. The Vincentians wanted Timon to close St. Mary of the Barrens as it was in deep debt, but Timon worked to save it. He visited the superior general of the Vincentians in Paris in 1837. The next year, Timon spent time in Galveston and Houston, Texas on missionary work.

In 1839, Pope Gregory XVI name Timon as coadjutor bishop of the Archdiocese of St. Louis, but he declined the appointment. Timon did not want to give up the missionary work that gave him so much satisfaction.

=== Prefect Apostolic of Texas ===
On July 18, 1840, Gregory XVI named Timon as prefect apostolic of the newly independent Republic of Texas, a position he accepted. Timon returned to France in 1841, where he met with the Vincentian superiors general and visited several Vincentian congregations near Paris. Between 1842 and 1847, Timon received requests from prelates in Cincinnati, Philadelphia, Louisville and New York to visit their seminaries and enact necessary reforms.

=== Bishop of Buffalo ===
On April 23, 1847, Pope Pius IX erected the Diocese of Buffalo and appointed Timon as its first bishop. In September 1847, Timon learned about his appointment. Lacking money for appropriate clothing and transportation to New York City for his consecration, he was helped out by some friends. Timon was consecrated on October 17, 1847, at St. Patrick's Cathedral in New York City by Archbishop John Hughes.

Timon was fluent in several languages including Gaelic, which served him well among the Irish community in Buffalo. Timon spent the remaining 20 years of his life in Buffalo. Beginning with 16 priests for 16 counties, he immediately began to build churches, and establish schools. He appointed Reverend Bernard O'Reilly as his vicar-general.

Timon recruited many religious orders to establish ministries in the diocese. These included the Daughters of Charity, the School Sisters of Notre Dame, the Ladies of the Sacred Heart, the Franciscans, the Sisters of Saint Mary of Namur, the Jesuits, the Oblates of Mary Immaculate, the Sisters of St. Joseph, the Vincentians, the Sisters of the Good Shepherd, the Grey Nuns of the Sacred Heart, the Sisters of Mercy, the Sisters of St. Francis, the Passionists, and the Christian Brothers.

St. Bonaventure University in St. Bonaventure, New York, was founded by Utica, New York, financier Nicholas Devereux, with assistance from Timon. The two invited the Franciscan order to Western New York, and a small group under Reverend Pamfilo of Magliano arrived in 1856.

=== Death and legacy ===
John Timon died in Buffalo on April 16, 1867, at the age of 70. He was buried in the crypt of Saint Joseph's Cathedral in Buffalo. Bishop Timon - St. Jude High School in Buffalo is named in his honor.

Catholic Church titles
Preceded by New Diocese	Bishop of Buffalo; 1847–1867	Succeeded by Stephen V. Ryan
Preceded by None	Prefect Apostolic of Texas; 1840–1847	Succeeded by None
