= Temperanceville, Ohio =

Unincorporated community in Ohio, U.S.

Coordinates: 39°54′28″N 81°13′46″W

Temperanceville is an unincorporated community in Belmont County, in the U.S. state of Ohio.

== History ==
Temperanceville had its start in 1837 when a gristmill was built there. The proprietor espoused "intense temperance principles", hence the name. A post office called Temperanceville was established in 1848, and remained in operation until 1961.
