= Vincent M. Rizzotto =

American Catholic bishop (1931–2021)

His Excellency, The Most Reverend Vincent Michael Rizzotto
- Auxiliary Bishop Emeritus of Galveston-Houston; Titular Bishop of Lamasba
- Archdiocese: Galveston-Houston
- Appointed: June 22, 2001
- Installed: July 31, 2001
- Term ended: November 6, 2006
- Other post: Titular Bishop of Lamasba

Orders
- Ordination: May 26, 1956 by Wendelin Joseph Nold
- Consecration: July 31, 2001 by Joseph Anthony Fiorenza, Patrick Flores, and John E. McCarthy

Personal details
- Born: September 9, 1931 Houston, Texas
- Died: January 17, 2021 (aged 89) Houston, Texas
- Education: Catholic University of America
- Motto: Make us one in Christ

Styles of Vincent Michael Rizzotto
- Reference style: His Excellency; The Most Reverend
- Spoken style: Your Excellency
- Religious style: Bishop

Vincent Michael Rizzotto (September 9, 1931 – January 17, 2021) was an American prelate of the Roman Catholic Church in the United States He served as an auxiliary bishop of the Archdiocese of Galveston-Houston in Texas from 2001 to 2006.

== Biography ==
=== Early life ===
Vincent Rizzotto was born on September 9, 1931, in Houston, Texas, to Catarina and Salvatore Rizzotto. He attended Holy Name Catholic School in Houston and then entered St. Thomas High School in Houston, graduating there in 1949. Deciding to become a priest, Rizzotto entered St. Mary's Seminary in Houston.

=== Priesthood ===
Rizzotto was ordained to the priesthood for the Diocese of Galveston at St. Mary Cathedral in Galveston, Texas, on May 26, 1956 by Bishop Wendelin Joseph Nold. After his ordination, the diocese assigned Rizzotto as an assistant pastor at St. Mary Parish in Port Arthur, Texas. In 1961, the diocese sent Rizzotto to Washington, D.C. to study at the Catholic University of America, where he obtained a Licentiate of Canon Law in 1963. After returning to Texas, he helped establish an Interracial Council in the diocese.

In March 1965, Rizzotto travelled to Selma, Alabama, to attend the funeral of Reverend James Reeb, a Unitarian Universalist minister who had been beaten to death in Selma. Reeb had been participating in civil protests organized by Dr. Martin Luther King Jr. and the Southern Christian Leadership Conference. After the service, Rizzotto participated in a memorial procession, enduring spits and insults from an angry white crowd.

He served as an official of the diocesan marriage tribunal from 1967 to 1972, and as pastor of All Saints Parish in Houston from 1969 to 1972.

Rizzotto was appointed pastor of St. Francis de Sales Parish in Houston in 1972, serving there for the next ten years. He was raised to the rank of monsignor in 1978. Rizzotto left St. Francis in 1982 to become pastor of St. Cecilia Parish in Hedwig Village, Texas, remaining there until 2002. The Vatican named Rizzotto as a protonotary apostolic in 2000. he also served as vicar general of the archdiocese.

=== Auxiliary Bishop of Galveston-Houston ===
On June 22, 2001, Rizzotto was appointed as auxiliary bishop of the Diocese of Galveston-Houston and titular bishop of Lamasba by Pope John Paul II. Rizzotto received his episcopal consecration on July 31, 2001, at Saint Michael's Church in Houston from Archbishop Joseph Fiorenza, with Archbishop Patrick Flores and Bishop John McCarthy serving as co-consecrators. Rizzotto selected as his episcopal motto: "Make Us One In Christ."

=== Retirement and death ===
Upon reaching the mandatory retirement age of 75, Rizzotto sent his letter of resignation as auxiliary bishop of Galveston-Houston to Pope Benedict XVI. The pope accepted it on November 6, 2006. Rizzotto founded the Bishop Rizzotto Golf Classic in Houston, which benefits the elderly residents of the St. Dominic senior care community in Houston.

Rizzotto died on January 17, 2021, at age 89 in Houston.

== See also ==
- Catholic Church hierarchy
- Catholic Church in the United States
- Historical list of the Catholic bishops of the United States
- List of Catholic bishops of the United States
- Lists of patriarchs, archbishops, and bishops

== Episcopal succession ==
Catholic Church titles
Preceded by -	Auxiliary Bishop of Galveston-Houston; 2001-2006	Succeeded by -
