= James Anthony Tamayo =

American Catholic prelate (born 1949)

His Excellency, The Most Reverend James Anthony Tamayo
- Bishop Emeritus of Laredo
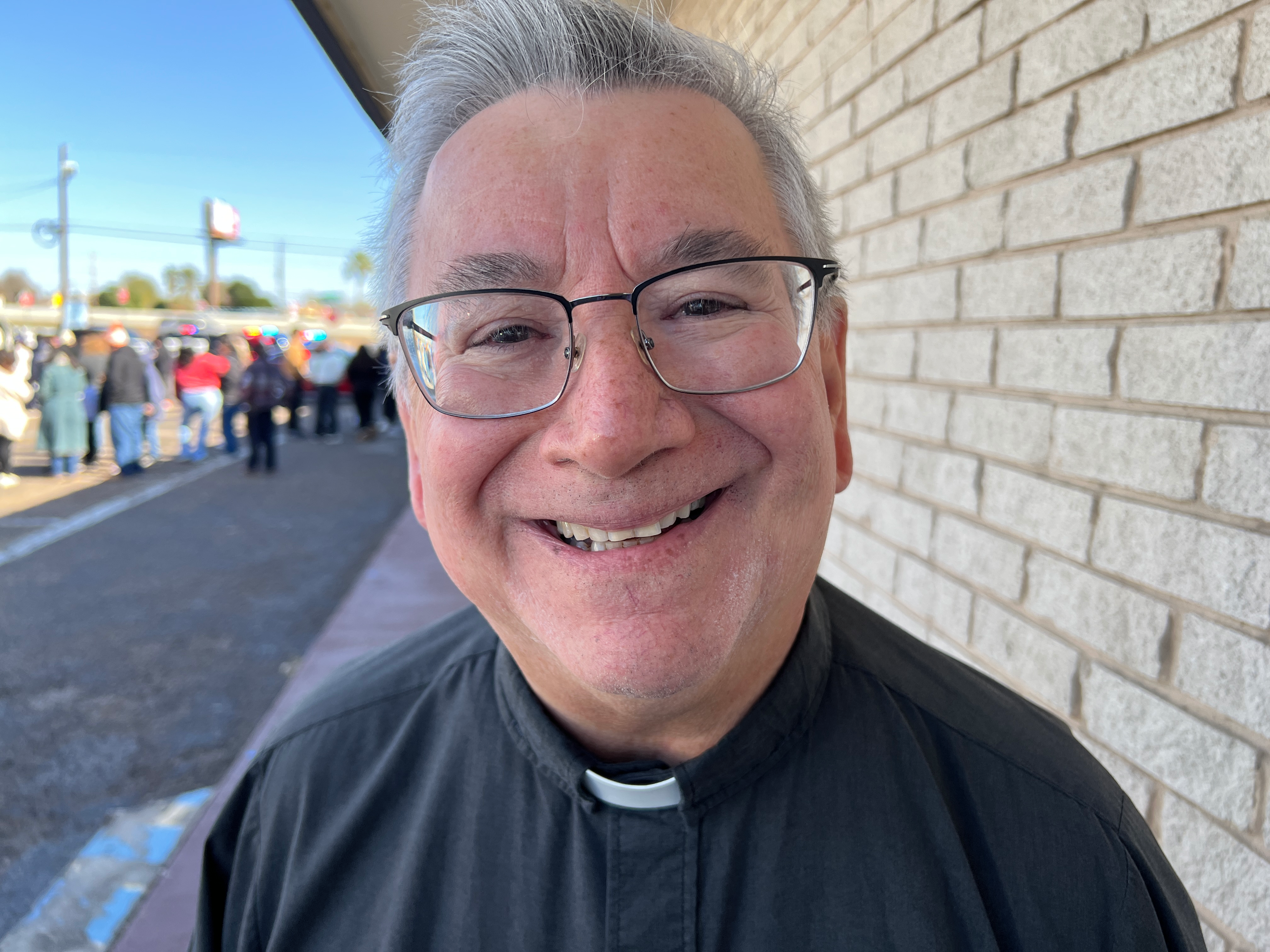
- Tamayo in 2025
- Church: Catholic
- Diocese: Laredo
- Appointed: July 3, 2000
- Installed: August 9, 2000
- Retired: May 1, 2026
- Predecessor: Position established
- Successor: John Jairo Gomez
- Previous posts: Auxiliary Bishop of Galveston-Houston and; Titular Bishop of Ita (1993‍–‍2000)

Orders
- Ordination: July 11, 1976 by Thomas Joseph Drury
- Consecration: March 10, 1993 by Joseph Fiorenza, René Henry Gracida, and Enrique San Pedro

Personal details
- Born: October 23, 1949 (age 76) Brownsville, Texas, US
- Education: University of St. Thomas; St. Mary's Seminary
- Motto: Todo con amor (Spanish for 'All with love')

Styles of James Anthony Tamayo
- Reference style: His Excellency; The Most Reverend
- Spoken style: Your Excellency
- Religious style: Bishop

James Anthony Tamayo (born October 23, 1949) is an American prelate of the Catholic Church. He served as the first bishop of the Diocese of Laredo in Texas from 2000-2026. He previously served as an auxiliary bishop of the Diocese of Galveston-Houston in Texas from 1993 to 2000.

== Biography ==
=== Early life ===
James Tamayo was born on October 23, 1949, in Brownsville, Texas, the son of Antonio P. Tamayo and Guadalupe B. Tamayo. He has a sister, Mercy Barrera of Corpus Christi, Texas. He holds a Master of Theology degree from the University of St. Thomas and attended St. Mary's Seminary, both in Houston, Texas.

=== Priesthood ===
Tamayo was ordained a priest at Corpus Christi Cathedral in Corpus Christi by Bishop Thomas Drury for the Diocese of Corpus Christi on July 11, 1976. After his 1976 ordination, the diocese assigned Tamayo as associate pastor of St. Patrick Parish in Corpus Christi along with chaplain to the local branch of the Catholic Daughters of America (Junior Division).

Tamayo was named assistant chancellor in 1980. In 1981, the diocese transferred Tamayo from St. Patrick to the Corpus Christi Cathedral Parish to serve as associate pastor there. He was named associate pastor of St. Pius X Parish in Corpus Christi in 1982.

In 1986, the diocese appointed Tamayo as pastor of St. Andrew by the Sea Parish in Corpus Christi. He was moved again to Blessed Sacrament Parish in Laredo, Texas, in 1990 and was named episcopal vicar of the Western Vicariate of the diocese.

== Episcopal career ==
=== Auxiliary Bishop of Galveston-Houston ===
Pope John Paul II appointed Tamayo as an auxiliary bishop for the Diocese of Galveston-Houston on January 26, 1993. He was consecrated at the Sam Houston Coliseum in Houston, Texas, by Archbishop Joseph Fiorenza on March 10, 1993. He also became the titular bishop of Ita.As auxiliary bishop, Tamayo served as vicar general of the diocese and episcopal vicar for the Hispanic ministry.

=== Bishop of Laredo ===
On July 3, 2000, John Paul II appointed Tamayo as bishop of the newly-founded Diocese of Laredo. On August 9, 2000, he was installed as its first bishop.

In 2002, a priest from New York City was arrested in Laredo on rape charges out of New York. The district attorney of Kings County in New York said that the Diocese of Laredo was "less than satisfactory" in cooperating with their investigation. Tamayo did not explain the circumstances under which the priest had left his diocese.

As bishop, Tamayo holds the following posts:

- Chaplain for the Texas State Council of the Knights of Columbus
- Texas state chaplain for the Catholic Daughters of the Americas
- National episcopal advisor for the Cursillo Movement
- Regional executive board member for Boy Scouts of America

In March 2016, Tamayo halted the construction of a Catholic student center at Texas A&M International University (TAMIU) in Laredo. The Brothers of St. John, key sponsors of the $4 million-plus project, held a groundbreaking ceremony in November 2013. Tamayo did not attend the groundbreaking; nor did he offer an explanation for his opposition to the project, even to TAMIU President Ray Keck. Hundreds of thousands of preliminary funds have already been spent on the project, which has been on the drawing board for a decade. Glen S. Jackson of Alexandria questioned Tamayo's opposition to the student center, which he said has caused a "hostile atmosphere" in the Laredo diocese. Jackson had claimed that 99 percent of the clergy in the Laredo diocese favors the project.

On May 1, 2026, Pope Leo XIV accepted his resignation after reaching and surpassing the madatory retirement age of 75.

== See also ==
- Catholic Church hierarchy
- Catholic Church in the United States
- Historical list of the Catholic bishops of the United States
- List of Catholic bishops of the United States
- Lists of patriarchs, archbishops, and bishops

== Episcopal succession ==
Catholic Church titles
Preceded by First Bishop	Bishop of Laredo; 2000–2026	Succeeded by John Jairo Gomez
Preceded by -	Auxiliary Bishop of Galveston-Houston; 1993-2000	Succeeded by -
