= List of schools of the Roman Catholic Diocese of Corpus Christi =

This is a list of schools of the Roman Catholic Diocese of Corpus Christi.

== K-12 schools ==
- Incarnate Word Academy (Corpus Christi)

== 8-12 schools ==
- St. John Paul II Academy - High School (Corpus Christi)

== K-8 schools ==
- Our Lady of Perpetual Help Academy (Corpus Christi)
- Saint Anthony School (Robstown)

== Middle schools ==
- St. John Paul II Academy - Middle School (Corpus Christi)

== Elementary schools ==
- Most Precious Blood Catholic School (Corpus Christi)
- Sacred Heart School (Rockport)
- Saint Elizabeth School (Alice)
- Saint Patrick School (Corpus Christi)
- Saint Pius X Catholic School (Corpus Christi)
- Saints Cyril and Methodius School (Corpus Christi)

== Former schools ==
Christ the King Elementary School opened in 1948 and closed in 2015. Central Catholic School closed in 2018. St. Gertrude the Great School was formerly in Kingsville. The school closed in 2019. It was the final Catholic school in the Kingsville region. Holy Family Catholic School opened in 1956 and closed in 2020.

There was also Saint Joseph School in Alice.
