= Adolph Marx (bishop) =

German-born prelate

His Excellency, The Most Reverend Adolph Marx
- Bishop of Brownsville
- Church: Catholic Church
- Appointed: July 9, 1965
- Installed: September 2, 1965
- Term ended: November 1, 1965
- Successor: Humberto Sousa Medeiros

Orders
- Ordination: May 2, 1940 by Emmanuel Boleslaus Ledvina
- Consecration: October 9, 1956 by Mariano Simon Garriga

Personal details
- Born: February 18, 1915 Cologne, Germany
- Died: November 1, 1965 (aged 50) Cologne
- Motto: Plenitudo legis dilectio (The fulfillment of the law is love)

Adolph Marx (February 18, 1915 – November 1, 1965) was a German-born prelate of the Roman Catholic Church. He served as the first bishop of the Diocese of Brownsville in Texas from September to November 1965. He previously served as an auxiliary bishop of the Diocese of Corpus Christi in Texas from 1956 to 1965.

== Biography ==
=== Early life ===
Adolph Marx was born on February 18, 1915, in Cologne, Germany. He was ordained a priest in Corpus Christi, Texas, by Bishop Emmanuel Ledvina for the Diocese of Corpus Christi on May 2, 1940.

=== Auxiliary Bishop of Corpus Christi ===
On July 6, 1956, Pope Pius XII appointed Marx as an auxiliary bishop of Corpus Christi; he was consecrated at Corpus Christi Cathedral on October 9, 1956, by Bishop Mariano Garriga. He was also appointed as titular bishop of Citrus. Marx attended the Second Vatican Council in Rome during the early 1960s.

=== Bishop of Brownsville ===
On July 9, 1965, Pope Paul VI appointed Marx as bishop of Brownsville; he was installed in Brownsville, Texas, on September 2, 1965. Adolph Marx died in Cologne while on a visit on November 1, 1965, at age 50.

== Episcopal succession ==
Catholic Church titles
Diocese established	Bishop of Brownsville; 1965	Succeeded by Humberto Sousa Medeiros
Position established	Auxiliary Bishop of Corpus Christi; 1956–1965	Vacant
Vacant Title last held by Pie Eugène Neveu	Titular Bishop of Citrus; 1956–1965	Vacant
