= KHOY =

Radio station in Laredo, Texas

Laredo, Texas; United States
- Broadcast area: Laredo, Texas; Nuevo Laredo, Tamaulipas
- Frequency: 88.1 MHz
- Branding: KHOY 88.1, Good Company

Programming
- Format: Easy listening

Ownership
- Owner: Diocese of Laredo; (Laredo Catholic Communications, Inc.)

History
- First air date: December 17, 1985
- Call sign meaning: hoy means "today" in Spanish

Technical information
- Licensing authority: FCC
- Facility ID: 16946
- Class: A
- ERP: 4,300 watts
- HAAT: 106 meters
- Transmitter coordinates: 27°31′13″N 99°31′20″W

Links
- Public license information: Public file; LMS
- Webcast: Listen Live
- Website: khoy.org

KHOY (88.1 FM) is an easy listening-formatted radio station in Laredo, Texas, United States targeting a Catholic audience. It is owned by Laredo Catholic Communications, Inc., itself under the Diocese of Laredo, with studios on Corpus Christi Street in Laredo.

== History ==
In February 1984, the Diocese of Corpus Christi, which at the time included Laredo in its territory, received construction permits to build new radio stations on 89.5 MHz in Robstown and 88.1 MHz in Laredo, which was then part of the diocese. The names KLUX, with lux meaning "light" in Latin, and KHOY, with hoy meaning "today" in Spanish, were chosen for the new stations. KLUX was also to be known as the "Light of the Coastal Bend". The radio stations project represented part of an ambitious media project for the diocese, known as the Catholic Communications Network, which also included the planned establishment of a television station in Laredo; the diocese already produced television programs for air on public-access cable channels and commercial stations. An $860,000 grant from the John G. and Maria Stella Kenedy Foundation supported their establishment. In Laredo, the establishment of KHOY would come as part of a Christian radio boom in the city, as KBNL (89.9 FM) preceded it in starting up that July, and KFIX (92.7 FM) was also a Christian outlet. To assist in the guidance and operations of the Laredo station, a Laredo-specific advisory board was established.

KHOY began broadcasting on December 17, 1985, with bishop René Gracida traveling from Corpus Christi to participate in dedication ceremonies. Originally supported primarily by corporate underwriters, the station held its first on-air fundraising drive in 1992.

In 1996, management operations were spun out from the Diocesan Telecommunications Corporation in Corpus Christi to a new local company, Laredo Catholic Communications, Inc., which was still primarily subsidized by the diocese. The move had the effect of increasing local control of the station. The Diocese of Laredo was erected in 2000, and KHOY was among the church properties transferred from the Diocese of Corpus Christi.

Despite having a format broadly similar to KLUX—with easy listening music, inspirational messages, and various Sunday religious programs including a live Mass—KHOY also has broadcast other programming, including local and professional sports. From the 1990s through the early 2010s, KHOY was the local broadcaster of the Dallas Cowboys; commercial breaks were filled with public service announcements. The station has also been a regular broadcaster of high school football since 2006, with halftime "Faith in Football" interview segments with student-athletes. In addition, in the early 2000s, KHOY aired audio of the evening newscasts of local TV station KGNS-TV.
