= Corpus Christi Catholic High School =

Corpus Christi Catholic High School may refer to:

- Corpus Christi Catholic High School, Fulwood, Lancashire, England
- Corpus Christi Catholic High School, Wollongong, New South Wales, Australia
- Corpus Christi Roman Catholic High School, Cardiff, Wales

== See also ==
Two Catholic high schools in Corpus Christi, Texas:

- Incarnate Word Academy
- St. John Paul II High School
