= Incarnate Word Academy =

Incarnate Word Academy can refer to:

- Incarnate Word Academy (Bel-Nor, Missouri), St. Louis, Missouri
- Incarnate Word Academy (Ohio), Cleveland, Ohio
- Incarnate Word Academy (Brownsville, Texas), Brownsville, Texas
- Incarnate Word Academy (Corpus Christi, Texas)
- Incarnate Word Academy (Houston), Texas
