= Paul Joseph Nussbaum =

American prelate

His Excellency, The Most Reverend Paul Joseph Nussbaum C.P.
- Bishop of Sault Sainte Marie-Marquette; Titular Bishop of Gerasa
- Church: Roman Catholic Church
- See: Diocese of Sault Sainte Marie-Marquette
- In office: November 14, 1922; June 24, 1935
- Predecessor: Frederick Eis
- Successor: Joseph Casimir Plagens
- Other posts: Bishop of Corpus Christi; 1913 to 1920

Orders
- Ordination: May 20, 1894 by João Fernando Santiago Esberard
- Consecration: May 20, 1913 by Giovanni Bonzano

Personal details
- Born: Henry Nussbaum; September 7, 1870 Philadelphia, Pennsylvania, US
- Died: June 24, 1935 (aged 64) Marquette, Michigan, US
- Motto: Passio Christi in corporibus (The passion of Christ in bodies)

Paul Joseph Nussbaum, C.P. (September 7, 1870 – June 24, 1935) was an American prelate of the Roman Catholic Church. He served as bishop of the Diocese of Corpus Christi in Texas (1913–1920) and as bishop of the Diocese of Sault Sainte Marie-Marquette in Michigan (1922–1935).

Nussbaum was the first member of the Congregation of the Passion of Jesus Christ (Passionist) to be appointed bishop in the United States.

== Biography ==
=== Early life ===
Henry Nussbaum was born on September 7, 1870, in Philadelphia, Pennsylvania, to Bernard and Louise (née Erne) Nussbaum. Orphaned at a young age, he was raised by relatives. He made his profession as a Passionist on July 24, 1887, taking the religious name of Paul Joseph. Later that year, the Passionists sent him to Brazil as a missionary.

=== Priesthood ===
Nussbaum was ordained to the priesthood for the Passionists in Rio de Janeiro in Brazil by Archbishop João Fernando Santiago Esberard on May 20, 1894. The Passionists then sent Nussbaum to Argentina as a missionary. Nussbaum returned to the United States in 1904 to first serve as a curate in a parish in West Hoboken, New Jersey, then in Dunkirk, New York. From 1908 to 1913, Nussbaum was a consultor for St. Paul of the Cross Province.

=== Bishop of Corpus Christi ===
On April 4, 1913, Nussbaum was appointed as the first bishop of the newly erected Diocese of Corpus Christi by Pope Pius X. He received his episcopal consecration on May 20, 1913, from Archbishop Giovanni Bonzano, with Bishops John O'Connor and Charles McDonnell serving as co-consecrators, in West Hoboken. He was the first Passionist to be appointed bishop in the United States. Nussbaum was installed at Corpus Christi Cathedral on June 8, 1913.

As bishop, Nussbaum founded St. Ann's Society for married women, and promoted the Forty Hours' Devotion and daily communion. He also emphasized Catholic education and doubled the number of parochial schools in the diocese. In 1918, Nussbaum was seriously injured in a train accident from which he never fully recovered. During his tenure, he welcomed into the diocese many Mexican priests and nuns who were forced to flee Mexico due to the Mexican Revolution of 1910 to 1920. He set up Duns Scots College in Hebbronville, Texas, to train seminarians for future service in Mexico.

On March 26, 1920, Pope Pius XI accepted Nussbaum's resignation for health reasons as bishop of Corpus Christi; the pope then named him titular bishop of Gerasa. Nussbaum then returned to St. Michael's Monastery in West Hoboken as a faculty member for seminarians.

=== Bishop of Sault Sainte Marie and Marquette ===
Following the resignation of Bishop Frederick Eis, Nussbaum was appointed the fifth bishop of Sault Sainte Marie-Marquette on November 14, 1922.

=== Death and legacy ===
Paul Nussbaum died from a stroke on June 24, 1935, at St. Mary's Hospital in Marquette, Michigan, at age 64. He was buried in West Hoboken. His remains were transferred to Corpus Christi Cathedral in 1985 by Bishop Rene H. Gracida.

== Episcopal succession ==
Catholic Church titles
Preceded by Peter Verdaguer y Prat	Bishop of Corpus Christi; 1913–1920	Succeeded by Emmanuel Boleslaus Ledvina
Preceded by Frederick Eis	Bishop of Sault Sainte Marie-Marquette; 1922–1935	Succeeded by Joseph Casimir Plagens
