= Daniel E. Flores =

American Catholic prelate (born 1965)

His Excellency, The Most Reverend Daniel E. Flores
- Bishop of Brownsville; Vice President of the United States Conference of Catholic Bishops
- Diocese: Brownsville
- Appointed: December 9, 2009
- Installed: February 2, 2010
- Predecessor: Raymundo Joseph Peña
- Previous post: Auxiliary Bishop of Detroit & Titular Bishop of Cozyla (2006–2010)

Orders
- Ordination: January 30, 1988 by René Henry Gracida
- Consecration: November 29, 2006 by Adam Maida, Edmond Carmody, and René Henry Gracida

Personal details
- Born: August 28, 1961 (age 65) Palacios, Texas, US
- Education: University of Texas at Austin; Holy Trinity Seminary; University of Dallas; Pontifical University of Saint Thomas Aquinas
- Motto: Verbum mittitur spirans amorem (Latin for 'The word is sent breathing forth love')
- Styles
- Reference style: His Excellency; The Most Reverend
- Spoken style: Your Excellency
- Religious style: Bishop

Daniel Ernesto Flores (born August 28, 1961) is an American Catholic prelate serving as bishop of Brownsville since 2009 and as Vice President of the United States Conference of Catholic Bishops since 2025. He served as an auxiliary bishop of the Archdiocese of Detroit in Michigan from 2006 to 2009.

== Biography ==
=== Early life and education ===
Flores was born on August 28, 1961, in Palacios, Texas, to Fernando and Lydia Flores. His parents came from Zapata, Texas, with roots on both sides of the U.S.-Mexico border. Daniel Flores has one sister, Teresa, and two brothers, Billie and Javier.

Shortly after Flores' birth, his family moved to Corpus Christi, Texas. He graduated from Flour Bluff High School in Corpus Christi in 1979, and then studied at the University of Texas at Austin for two years. After deciding to enter the priesthood, Flores entered Holy Trinity Seminary in Irving, Texas in 1981. He then enrolled at the University of Dallas in Dallas, obtaining a Bachelor of Philosophy degree in 1983 and a Master of Divinity degree in 1987.

=== Priesthood ===
Flores was ordained to the priesthood for the Diocese of Corpus Christi by Bishop René Gracida at Corpus Christi Cathedral on January 30, 1988.

After his 1988 ordination, the diocese assigned Flores as parochial vicar at Corpus Christi Cathedral Parish. Between 1992 and 1997, he also served as the private secretary and master of ceremonies to Gracida, vice-chancellor of the diocese, rector of the St. John Vianney House of Studies, and episcopal vicar for vocations. The Vatican raised Flores to chaplain to his holiness in September 1995.

In 1997, Bishop Roberto Nieves sent Flores to Rome to further his studies. In 2000, Flores received a Doctor of Theology degree from the Pontifical University of St. Thomas Aquinas in Rome. After Flores returned to Corpus Christi, Nieves named him as chancellor of the diocese.

In August 2001, the diocese assigned Flores as a professor of theology at the University of St. Thomas in Houston and formation director at St. Mary's Seminary in Houston. He was promoted to vice-rector of St. Mary's in 2002. Flores left Houston in 2006 to become rector of Corpus Christi Cathedral Parish.

=== Auxiliary Bishop of Detroit ===
On October 28, 2006, Flores was appointed as auxiliary bishop of Detroit and titular bishop of Cozyla by Pope Benedict XVI. He received his episcopal consecration at the Cathedral of the Most Blessed Sacrament in Detroit on November 29, 2006, from Cardinal Adam Maida, with Bishops Edmond Carmody and René Gracida serving as co-consecrators. His episcopal motto, taken from the Summa Theologica, is: Verbum Mittitur Spirans Amorem ("The Word Is Sent Breathing Forth Love"). Flores became the first Hispanic bishop in Detroit.

=== Bishop of Brownsville ===
On December 9, 2009, Benedict XVI appointed Flores as bishop of Brownsville, succeeding Bishop Raymundo Peña, and was installed on February 2, 2010. On November 16, 2020, Flores was elected to head the Committee on Doctrine of the USCCB.

On October 23, 2024, the Synod of Bishops elected Flores a member of the Ordinary Council of the General Secretariat of the Synod.

== Viewpoints ==
=== Immigration ===
On June 12, 2019, Flores addressed the United States Conference of Catholic Bishops (USCCB) regarding the policies of the Trump Administration towards undocumented immigrants on the U.S.-Mexico border.

“I feel that as a (bishops’) conference, we must express ourselves more strongly when it comes to the dignity of immigrants, to say that they are not criminals, that they are vulnerable families and we need to invite all the governments involved, not just the U.S., to defend the migrant as a human being, to not cast the person aside as someone who doesn’t matter and is a problem,”

=== Gun control ===
After the 2022 mass shooting at an elementary school in Uvalde, Texas, Flores released the following tweet:

Don’t tell me that guns aren’t the problem, people are. I’m sick of hearing it. The darkness first takes our children who then kill our children, using the guns that are easier to obtain than aspirin. We sacralize death’s instruments and then are surprised that death uses them.

== See also ==
- Catholic Church hierarchy
- Catholic Church in the United States
- Historical list of the Catholic bishops of the United States
- List of Catholic bishops of the United States
- Lists of patriarchs, archbishops, and bishops

Catholic Church titles
Preceded by Raymundo Joseph Peña	Bishop of Brownsville; November 9, 2010–Present	Succeeded by Incumbent
Preceded by –	Auxiliary Bishop of Detroit; 2006–2010	Succeeded by –
