= Raymundo Joseph Peña =

American Roman Catholic bishop (1934–2021)

His Excellency, The Most Reverend Raymundo Joseph Peña
- Bishop of Brownsville; Titular Bishop of Trisipa
- Diocese: Diocese of Brownsville
- Appointed: May 23, 1994
- Installed: August 6, 1995
- Term ended: December 9, 2009
- Predecessor: Enrique San Pedro
- Successor: Daniel E. Flores
- Previous posts: Auxiliary Bishop of San Antonio (1976 to 1980); Bishop of El Paso (1980 to 1995)

Orders
- Ordination: May 25, 1957 by Mariano Simon Garriga
- Consecration: December 13, 1976 by Francis James Furey, Patrick Flores, and Thomas Joseph Drury

Personal details
- Born: February 19, 1934 Corpus Christi, Texas, US
- Died: September 24, 2021 (aged 87) San Juan, Texas, US
- Motto: Haz todo con amor (Do everything with love)

Styles of Raymundo Joseph Peña
- Reference style: His Excellency; The Most Reverend
- Spoken style: Your Excellency
- Religious style: Bishop

Raymundo Joseph Peña (February 19, 1934 – September 24, 2021) was an American prelate of the Roman Catholic Church. He served as the bishop of the Diocese of Brownsville in Texas from 1995 to 2009, bishop of the Diocese of El Paso in Texas from 1980 to 1995 and auxiliary bishop of the Archdiocese of San Antonio in Texas from 1976 to 1980.

== Biography ==
=== Early life ===
Born in Corpus Christi, Texas on February 19, 1934, Raymundo Peña was the son of Cosme A. Peña and Elisa Ramon Peña. He attended both public and parochial schools in Robstown, Texas, then went to St. John's Seminary and Assumption Seminary, both in San Antonio, Texas.

=== Priesthood ===
Peña was ordained to the priesthood for the Diocese of Corpus Christi on May 25, 1957, at Corpus Christi Cathedral by Bishop Mariano Garriaga.

Peña was named as diocesan youth director in 1970, holding the position until 1976. In 1969, Peña was also appointed pastor of Our Lady of Guadalupe Parish in Corpus Christi, serving there until 1976. He became editor of the Texas Gulf Coast Catholic paper in 1970, along with vice-president of the Senate of Priests.

=== Auxiliary Bishop of San Antonio ===
On October 16, 1976, Pope Paul VI named Peña as titular bishop of Trisipa and auxiliary bishop of San Antonio. He was consecrated at the Convention Center Arena in San Antonio on December 13, 1976, by Archbishop Francis Furey.

In 1977, Peña was named as vicar general for the archdiocese as well as executive director of the Office of the Laity. In April 1979, after the death of Archbishop Francis Furey, Peña served as administrator sede vacante for the archdiocese until the installation of Bishop Patrick Flores as archbishop later in 1979.

=== Bishop of El Paso ===
On April 4, 1980, Pope John Paul II appointed Peña as bishop of El Paso. He was installed on June 18, 1980.

=== Bishop of Brownsville ===
On May 23, 1995, John Paul II appointed Peña as bishop of Brownsville. He was installed on August 6, 1995.

In December 2004, the Dallas Morning News published a report on how Peña handled accusations of sexual abuse against a foreign priest. Reverend Basil Onyia, a Nigerian priest, arrived in Diocese of Brownsville in 1999 and was assigned as assistant pastor of the Basilica of Our Lady of San Juan del Valle. In January 2009, Peña received complaints from two women in the parish that Onyia was touching them inappropriately. He told Onyia to stop it. In April 2000, after a woman filed a police complaint, Peña transferred Onyia. Later in 2000, two priests complained to Peña about Onyia's conduct. In January 2001, Peña asks Onyia's bishop in Nigeria to recall him. In February 2001, the relatives of a developmentally disabled girl accused Onyia of rape. Peña finally suspended Onyia, who fled to Nigeria to avoid arrest.

=== Resignation ===
Peña submitted his letter of resignation as bishop of Brownsville to the Congregation for Bishops upon reaching 75. His resignation was accepted by Pope Benedict XVI on December 9, 2009.

Raymundo Peña died in San Juan, Texas on September 24, 2021, at age 87.

== See also ==
- Catholic Church hierarchy
- Catholic Church in the United States
- Historical list of the Catholic bishops of the United States
- List of Catholic bishops of the United States
- Lists of patriarchs, archbishops, and bishops

== Episcopal succession ==
Catholic Church titles
Preceded by Enrique San Pedro, S.J.	Bishop of Brownsville; 1995– 2009	Succeeded by Daniel E. Flores
Preceded by Patrick Flores	Bishop of El Paso; 1980–1995	Succeeded by Armando Xavier Ochoa
Preceded by -	Auxiliary Bishop of San Antonio; 1976–1980	Succeeded by -
