= Saint Augustine High School (Laredo, Texas) =

Private school in Laredo, Texas, United States

St. Augustine High School

Location
- Laredo, (Webb County), Texas 78040; United States; 27.512111°N 99.483454°W

Information
- Type: Private school
- Motto: "Excellence in Catholic Education"
- Religious affiliation: Roman Catholic
- Patron saint: Saint Augustine
- Established: 1927
- Faculty: Roughly 100 members
- Grades: K–12
- Enrollment: 326 (2012)
- Average class size: Approximately 100/class
- Student to teacher ratio: Approximately 100/class and a student/teacher ratio of 22:1
- Campus: St. Augustine
- Colors: Royal blue & silver
- Athletics conference: TAPPS District 3-6A
- Mascot: Knights
- Accreditation: Texas Catholic Conference Education Department, with standards approved by the Texas Education Agency.
- Website: http://www.st-augustine.org

St. Augustine High School is a Catholic Diocesan co-educational private high school located in Laredo, Texas, United States. Grades 9 through 12 are taught in a Christian environment. St. Augustine is the only Catholic high school in Laredo. Approximately 390 students attend the school.

== History ==
St. Augustine was founded by the Oblates and the Sisters of Divine Providence in 1927. It was named in honor of Aurelius Augustinus (also known as Augustine of Hippo or Saint Augustine), one of the most important figures in the development of Western Christianity. The original St. Augustine campus was located in downtown in San Agustin Historical District in Laredo, Texas. During the mid-1970s the school was relocated. Through 1999 the school was under the control of the Roman Catholic Diocese of Corpus Christi. In 2000 the Roman Catholic Diocese of Laredo was established and the control of the school transferred to it. St. Augustine School is accredited by the Texas Catholic Conference Education Department.

== Community ==
There are 300 students enrolled with a class size of approximately 100/class and a student/ teacher ratio of 22:1.

== Curriculum ==
St. Augustine High School, a college preparatory institution, bases its curriculum on the State of Texas' Distinguished Achievement Plan (DAP).

Dual credit opportunities

Juniors and seniors may be concurrently enrolled at Laredo Community College or Texas A&M International University for dual credits of 12-24 college hours. With the college credit measure, over 50% of the Class of 2012 was projected to graduate DAP.

In 2011, St. Augustine High School embarked upon the UT ChemBridge Program in which seniors took CHEM 304&305 online as dual credit courses for six hours of college credit through the University of Texas at Austin. However, the school discontinued this program as of the 2013-2014 academic year. In 2012, the school partnered with Incarnate Word High School to offer Psychology online for dual credit.

== Athletics ==
St. Augustine School offers the following sports programs.

- Baseball
- Basketball
- Cross country
- Golf
- Tennis
- Track and field
- Volleyball
- 6 Man Football
- Soccer

== Notable alumni ==
- Alfonso Gomez-Rejon (Class of 1990) - Emmy-nominated film and television director; director of Me and Earl and the Dying Girl
- William Nericcio (Class of 1980) - Director of the Master of Arts in Liberal Arts and Sciences program at San Diego State University, San Diego and creator of #mextasy.
- Adrian Quesada (Class of 1995) - co-founder of Grammy Award-winning Latin funk orchestra Grupo Fantasma
- Saul N. Ramirez, Jr. (Class of 1976) - Mayor of Laredo 1990–1997; CEO of Washington interest group National Association of Housing and Redevelopment Officials
