= Adolph Marx =

Adolph Marx may refer to:

- Harpo Marx (Adolph Marx, 1893–1964), American comedian and film star
- Adolph Marx (bishop) (1915–1965), first Roman Catholic bishop of Brownsville, Texas

== See also ==
- Adolf Bernhard Marx (1795–1866), German composer, musical theorist and critic
- Adolf Marks, German publisher in Russia
