= Peter Verdaguer y Prat =

Catalan-born prelate

His Excellency, The Right Reverend Peter Verdaguer y Prat
- Vicar Apostolic of Brownsville; Titular Bishop of Aulon
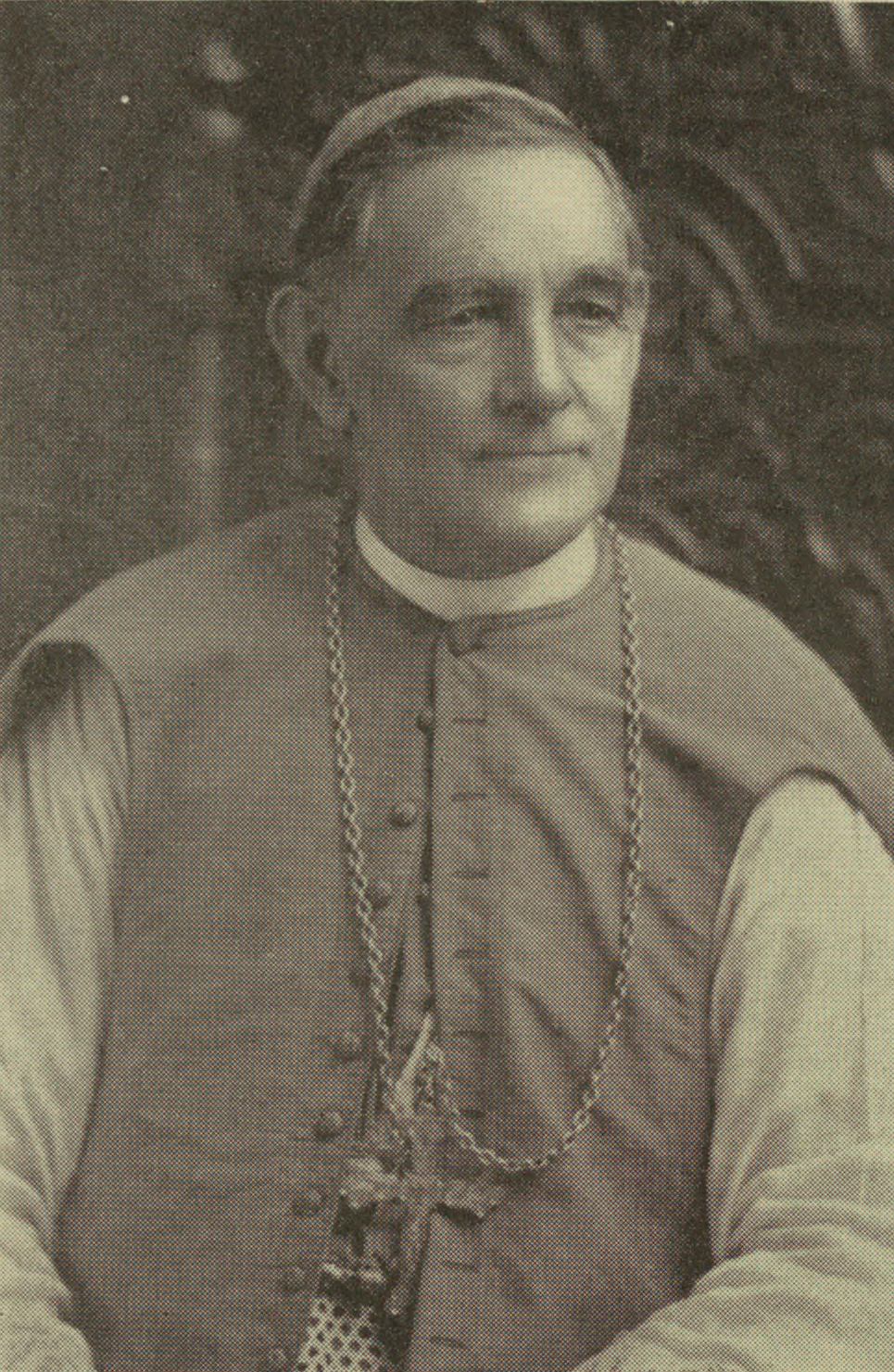
- Church: Catholic
- Diocese: Brownsville
- Appointed: July 25, 1890
- Predecessor: Dominic Manucy
- Successor: Paul Joseph Nussbaum

Orders
- Ordination: December 2, 1862 by Thaddeus Amat y Brusi
- Consecration: November 9, 1890 by Jaime Catalá y Albosa

Personal details
- Born: December 10, 1835 Sant Pere de Torelló, Catalonia, Spain
- Died: October 26, 1911 (aged 75) Between Laredo and Mercedes, Texas, US

Peter Verdaguer y Prat (December 10, 1835 – October 26, 1911) was a Catalan-born prelate of the Roman Catholic Church. He served as vicar apostolic of Brownsville in Texas from 1890 until his death in 1911.

== Biography ==
=== Early life ===
Peter Verdaguer y Prat was born on December 10, 1835, in Sant Pere de Torelló in the Province of Barcelona in the Kingdom of Spain to Francisco Verdaguer and Maria Prat Verdaguer. He attended seminaries of Vic and Barcelona, both in Spain, before immigrating to the United States. Verdaguer completed his theological studies at St. Vincent's Seminary in Cape Girardeau, Missouri.

=== Priesthood ===
Verdaguer was ordained to the priesthood for the Diocese of Monterey-Los Angeles by Bishop Thaddeus Amat y Brusi on December 12, 1862. After his ordination, the diocese assigned Verdaguer `as a missionary and pastor of parishes in San Bernardino and Los Angeles, California.

=== Vicar Apostolic of Brownsville ===
On July 25, 1890, Verdaguer was appointed vicar apostolic of Brownsville and titular bishop of Aulon by Pope Leo XIII. He received his consecration at the Cathedral of the Holy Cross and Saint Eulalia in Barcelona on November 9, 1890, from Bishop Jaime Catalá y Albosa, with Bishops José Morgades y Gili and José Meseguer y Costa serving as co-consecrators.

Verdaguer arrived in Texas in the Spring of 1891. Vicar Apostolic Manucy had established his episcopal see in Corpus Christi, Texas, due to unrest in Brownsville. However, since Verdaguer had relatives living in Laredo, Texas, he decided to relocate the see there. He invited several religious institutes into the vicariate, including the Sisters of Mercy, Claretians, and Sisters of Charity of the Incarnate Word. He opened two hospitals, several churches and parochial schools, and an orphanage. He increased the number of priests in the vicariate from 10 to 32 and saw the Catholic population increase by 40,000.

=== Death ===
Verdaguer died on October 26, 1911, while traveling from Laredo to Mercedes, Texas to perform confirmations; he was age 75. He is buried at Laredo Catholic Cemetery.

Catholic Church titles
Preceded by Dominic Manucy	Vicar Apostolic of Brownsville; 1890–1911	Succeeded by Paul Joseph Nussbaum (as Bishop of Corpus Christi)
