= John Joseph Fitzpatrick =

American Roman Catholic bishop

His Excellency, The Most Reverend John Joseph Fitzpatrick
- Bishop of Brownsville; Titular Bishop of Cenae
- Church: Catholic Church
- See: Diocese of Brownsville
- In office: 1971–1991
- Predecessor: Bishop Humberto Medeiros
- Successor: Bishop Enrique San Pedro
- Previous posts: Auxiliary Bishop of Miami; 1968 to 1971

Orders
- Ordination: December 13, 1942 by John Aloysius Duffy
- Consecration: August 28, 1968 by Coleman Carroll

Personal details
- Born: October 12, 1918 Trenton, Ontario, Canada
- Died: July 15, 2006 (aged 87) Brownsville, Texas, US
- Motto: Mihi vivere Christus (Let Christ live for me)

John Joseph Fitzpatrick (October 12, 1918 – July 15, 2006) was a Canadian-born prelate of the Roman Catholic Church. He served as an auxiliary bishop of the Archdiocese of Miami in Florida from 1968 to 1971 and as the third bishop of the Diocese of Brownsville in Texas from 1971 to 1991.

Fitzpatrick was described as a strong advocate for the poor and for refugees.

== Biography ==
=== Early life ===
John Fitzpatrick was born in Trenton, Ontario, Canada on October 12, 1918. When he was age five, his family moved to Buffalo, New York. He attended Catholic schools throughout high school. He went to Rome to study for the priesthood, but was forced to return to the United States in 1942 due to World War II. After the war, Fitzpatrick went back to Rome to complete his studies.

=== Priesthood ===
Fitzpatrick was ordained a priest in Rome by Bishop John Aloysius Duffy for the Diocese of Buffalo on December 13, 1942, when he was 24 years old. After his ordination, Duffy enlisted in the US Army Chaplain Corps and was assigned to an Army unit stationed in Florida during World War II.

Duffy was incardinated, or transferred, in 1948 from the Diocese of Buffalo to the Diocese of St Augustine in Florida. In 1958, Pope Pius XII erected the Diocese of Miami. At that time, Duffy are incardinated into the new diocese.

=== Auxiliary Bishop of Miami ===
Fitzpatrick was appointed by Pope Paul VI as auxiliary bishop of what was now the Archdiocese of Miami and titular bishop of Cenae on June 24, 1968. On August 28, 1968, he was consecrated a bishop at the Cathedral of Saint Mary in Miami, Florida, by Archbishop Coleman F. Carroll; his co-consecrators were Bishop Joseph Durick and Archbishop Joseph Bernardin.

=== Bishop of Brownsville ===
On April 27, 1971, Fitzpatrick was appointed by Paul VI as the third bishop of Brownsville. He was installed in Brownsville, Texas, on May 27, 1971. In 1982, Fitzpatrick opened Casa Oscar Romero in Brownsville, named after the murdered Salvadorian archbishop, Oscar Arnulfo Romero. It served as a shelter for refugees coming across the Mexican border into the United States. He eventually closed the shelter after repeated complaints from federal judges that he was violating US immigration law. Fitzpatrick set up a different shelter and even opened his own garage to refugees.

As bishop, he set up an extensive program to train lay people to assume roles within the diocese. He also established diocese radio and TV stations.

=== Retirement and legacy ===
On November 30, 1991, Pope John Paul II accepted Fitzpatrick's resignation as bishop of Brownsville. After the death of his replacement, Bishop Enrique San Pedro, in 1994, Fitzpatrick served as apostolic administrator for nearly a year until the appointment of Bishop Raymundo Peña in 1995. In 1994, Fitzpatrick testified in court on behalf of Stacey Lynn Merkt, a Catholic lay worker accused of illegally bringing two Salvadoran refugees into the United States. He said that aiding refugees was in accordance with the laws of man and of God

John Fitzpatrick died in Brownsville on July 15, 2006, at age 87.

== See also ==
Catholic Church titles
Preceded by Humberto Sousa Medeiros	Bishop of Brownsville; 1971–1991	Succeeded by Enrique San Pedro
Preceded by –	Auxiliary Bishop of Miami; 1968–1971	Succeeded by –
