= Mario Alberto Avilés =

Mexican-American Catholic prelate

His Excellency, The Most Reverend Mario Alberto Avilés CO
- Bishop of Corpus Christi
- Diocese: Corpus Christi
- Appointed: December 1, 2025
- Installed: January 28, 2026
- Predecessor: Michael Mulvey
- Previous posts: Auxiliary Bishop of Brownsville & Titular Bishop of Cataquas (2018-2025)

Orders
- Ordination: July 21, 1998 by José Raúl Vera López
- Consecration: February 22, 2018 by Daniel E. Flores, Raymundo Joseph Peña, and Eugenio Andrés Lira Rugarcía

Personal details
- Born: September 16, 1969 (age 56) Mexico City, Mexico
- Education: Pontifical Athenaeum Regina Apostolorum
- Motto: Caritas Dei diffusa est in cordibus nostris (God's love spreads through our hearts)

Styles of Mario Alberto Avilés
- Reference style: His Excellency; The Most Reverend
- Spoken style: Your Excellency
- Religious style: Bishop

Mario Alberto Avilés, C.O. (born September 16, 1969) is a Mexican-born American Catholic prelate who has been the Bishop of Corpus Christi since 2026. He served as an auxiliary bishop for the Diocese of Brownsville from 2018 to 2025. He is a member of the Oratorians.

== Biography ==
=== Early life ===
Mario Avilés was born on September 16, 1969, in Mexico City, Mexico, the son of Rafael and María Guadalupe. He entered the Oratory of Saint Philip Neri (Oratorians) in 1986, and began preparing for the priesthood at the Pan American University in Mexico City. He transferred to Pharr, Texas, in 1988.

He continued his studies at the Pontifical Athenaeum Regina Apostolorum in Rome, earning his Bachelor of Philosophy and Bachelor of Sacred Theology degrees there in 1998. He also received a Master of Education Administration and Supervision degree in Texas and qualified for a teaching certificate there. He also holds a Master of Divinity degree from the Holy Apostles College and Seminary in Cromwell, Connecticut.

=== Priesthood ===
On July 21, 1998, Avilés was ordained to the priesthood for the Oratorians at the Basilica of the National Shrine of Our Lady of San Juan del Valle in San Juan, Texas, by Bishop José Raúl Vera López.

After his 1998 ordination, the Oratorians assigned Avilés as parochial vicar of St. Jude Thaddeus Parish in Pharr. In 2000 the order named him a member of the permanent deputation of Confederation of the Oratory. In 2002, Avilés was appointed pastor of Sacred Heart Parish in Hidalgo, Texas, where he remained until 2017.

In addition to his position at Sacred Heart, Avilés in 2005 was appointed director of the Oratory Academy of St. Philip Neri, an elementary and middle school, and the Oratory Athenaeum For University Prep, a high school, both in Pharr. He became a member of the diocesan pastoral council in 2011. In 2012, the Oratorians appointed Avilés as their procurator general.

=== Auxiliary Bishop of Brownsville ===
Coat of Arms as Auxiliary Bishop of Brownsville

Pope Francis appointed Avilés the first auxiliary bishop of Brownsville on December 4, 2017. On February 22, 2018, Avilés was consecrated by Bishop Daniel E. Flores at Our Lady of San Juan, with Bishops Raymundo Peña and Eugenio Andrés Lira Rugarcía serving as co-consecrators.

=== Bishop of Corpus Christi ===
On December 1, 2025, Pope Leo XIV appointed Avilés as the Bishop of Corpus Christi. He was installed on January 28, 2026.

== See also ==
- Catholic Church hierarchy
- Catholic Church in the United States
- Historical list of the Catholic bishops of the United States
- List of Catholic bishops of the United States
- Lists of patriarchs, archbishops, and bishops

Catholic Church titles
Preceded by Michael Mulvey	Bishop of Corpus Christi; 2026-Present	Succeeded by Incumbent
Preceded by -	Auxiliary Bishop of Brownsville; 2018-2026	Succeeded by -
