= Michael Mulvey (bishop) =

American prelate of the Catholic Church (born 1949)

His Excellency, The Most Reverend William Michael Mulvey STL
- Bishop Emeritus of Corpus Christi
- Diocese: Corpus Christi
- Appointed: January 18, 2010
- Installed: March 25, 2010
- Retired: 1 December, 2025
- Predecessor: Edmond Carmody
- Successor: Mario Alberto Avilés

Orders
- Ordination: June 29, 1975 by Pope Paul VI
- Consecration: March 25, 2010 by Daniel DiNardo, Gregory Michael Aymond, and Edmond Carmody

Personal details
- Born: August 23, 1949 (age 76) Houston, Texas, U.S.
- Education: St. Edward's University, BBA (1971); Pontifical University of Saint Thomas Aquinas, BST (1974); Pontifical Gregorian University, STL (1976)
- Motto: Sententia In Christo Vobis (Assume the attitude of Christ)

Styles of William Michael Mulvey
- Reference style: His Excellency; The Most Reverend
- Spoken style: Your Excellency
- Religious style: Bishop

William Michael Mulvey STL (born August 23, 1949) is an American prelate of the Catholic Church who served as bishop of the Diocese of Corpus Christi in Texas from 2010 to 2025.

== Biography ==
=== Early life and education ===
William Mulvey was born on August 23, 1949, in Houston, Texas, the second of six children of Daniel H. Mulvey Jr. and Marjorie Jane Patterson Mulvey. His siblings are Dan, Martha, John, Tim and Kim. He has 12 nieces and nephews. All of William Mulvey's early education was completed at Catholic schools, including St. Theresa and St. Cecilia Schools in Houston. He also attended St. Thomas High School in Houston in 1966. Mulvey was confirmed by Bishop Wendelin Nold at St. Cecilia Parish in Houston.

Mulvey graduated St. Edward's Catholic High School in Austin, Texas, in 1967 and then entered St. Edward's University in Austin. He graduated from St. Edward's in 1971 with a Bachelor of Business Administration degree.

After finishing college, Mulvey decided to become a priest. He traveled to Rome to attend the seminary at the Pontifical North American College. He was awarded a Bachelor of Sacred Theology degree from the Pontifical University of Saint Thomas Aquinas in 1974. Two years later, Mulvey received his Licentiate in Sacred Theology from the Pontifical Gregorian University.

=== Priesthood ===
Mulvey was ordained to the priesthood for the Diocese of Austin on June 29, 1975, by Pope Paul VI in St. Peter's Square in Vatican City, one of 359 priests ordained by Paul VI on that occasion. After Mulvey returned to Austin in 1976, the diocese assigned him as associate pastor at the following Texas parishes:

- St. Mary/Our Lady of Guadalupe in Taylor, Texas, from 1976 to 1977
- St. Louis in Austin, from 1977 to 1980

In 1980, Mulvey spent a sabbatical year with the Focolare movement. After his sabbatical, the diocese assigned him as chaplain at Bishop Louis Reicher Catholic High School in Waco, Texas. He was also named in 1984 as pastor of St. Joseph Parish in Waco, Texas. Mulvey left Waco in 1986 to become director of spiritual formation at St. Mary's Seminary in Houston. He remained in that posting until 1992, when the diocese appointed him as pastor of St. Thomas Aquinas Parish in College Station, Texas.

Mulvey moved back to Italy in 1995 after he was appointed director of the Center for Spirituality for Diocesan Priests, a Focolare facility in Florence. Two years later, he became director of the Focolare Center in Hyde Park, New York. After four years with the Focolare movement, Mulvey returned to Texas in 1999 to become pastor of St. Helen Parish in Georgetown.

Mulvey left St. Helen in 2004 when Bishop Gregory Aymond named him as chancellor of the diocese. Mulvey became vicar general in 2007. He was named in August 2009 as vice rector of St. Mary's Seminary in Houston. A few weeks later, he was elected administrator of the Diocese of Austin after Aymond was named archbishop of the Archdiocese of New Orleans.

=== Bishop of Corpus Christi ===
Mulvey was appointed as bishop of Corpus Christi by Pope Benedict XVI on January 18, 2010. Mulvey was consecrated on March 25, 2010, by Cardinal Daniel DiNardo. His principal co-consecrators were Aymond and Bishop Edmond Carmody.

In March 2019. Mulvey and the diocese were sued for defamation by Monsignor Michael Heras and Reverend John Feminelli. The two clerics had been included on a list of diocesan clergy with credible accusations of sexual abuse that was released by the diocese in January 2019. The lawsuit was dismissed in August 2019.

In November 2019, Mulvey made a peripheral stem cell donation to a San Antonio woman with cancer. He had joined the Be the Match Registry for bone marrow transplants before he became bishop. Mulvey in May 2020 condemned the domestic terrorism attack that wounded a sailor at the Naval Air Station Corpus Christi.

Pope Leo XIV accepted Mulvey's resignation as Bishop on the 1st of December 2025, and appointed Mario Alberto Avilés to succeed him.

== See also ==
- Catholic Church hierarchy
- Catholic Church in the United States
- Historical list of the Catholic bishops of the United States
- List of Catholic bishops of the United States
- Lists of patriarchs, archbishops, and bishops

== Episcopal succession ==
Catholic Church titles
Preceded by Edmond Carmody	Bishop of Corpus Christi; 2010–2025	Succeeded by Mario Alberto Avilés
