= John Jairo Gomez =

American Catholic prelate (born 1975)

His Excellency, The Most Reverend John Jairo Gomez
- Bishop of Laredo
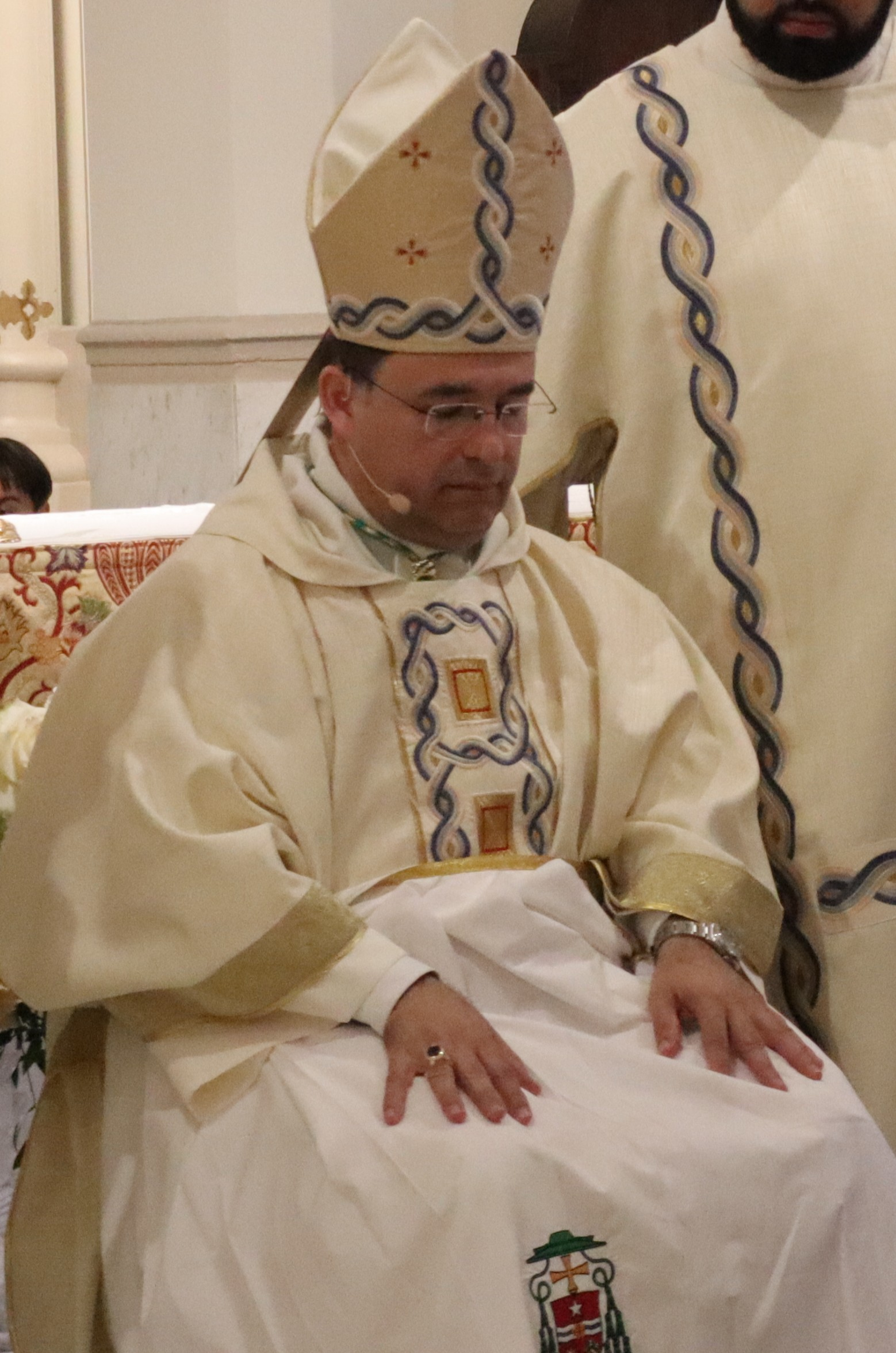
- Gomez in 2026
- Church: Catholic Church; Latin Church
- Diocese: Laredo
- Appointed: May 1, 2026
- Installed: June 30, 2026
- Predecessor: James Anthony Tamayo

Orders
- Ordination: May 23, 2009 by Álvaro Corrada del Río
- Consecration: June 30, 2026 by Gustavo García-Siller, Joe S. Vásquez, and James Anthony Tamayo

Personal details
- Born: December 15, 1975 (age 50) Santa Rosa de Cabal, Risaralda Department, Colombia
- Motto: Ego elegi vos et posui vos (Latin for 'I chose you and appointed you')
- Styles
- Reference style: His Excellency; The Most Reverend
- Spoken style: Your Excellency
- Religious style: Bishop

John Jairo Gomez (born December 15, 1975) is a Colombian-American Catholic prelate who has served as Bishop of Laredo since 2026.

== Early life and education ==
Gomez was born in Santa Rosa de Cabal, Colombia on December 15, 1975, the son of the late José Jairo Gomez and Martha Lucía Cardona. Raised in Cali, Gomez fulfilled his mandatory military service in the National Army of Colombia after completing his secondary education. Emigrating to the United States in 2002 (and becoming a citizen in 2021), Gomez entered formation for the Diocese of Tyler. Gomez earned a Bachelor of Arts in Philosophy from Saint John Vianney Seminary in Miami in 2004 and a Master of Arts in Theological Studies, a Master of Divinity, and a Bachelor of Sacred Theology from University of St. Thomas in 2009. He later completed a J.C.L. in canonical studies at the Pontifical Gregorian University in Rome in 2012.

== Priesthood ==
Gomez was ordained a priest on May 23, 2009, and went on to serve in various roles in the Diocese of Tyler. After completing his studies in Rome, Gomez served as parochial administrator and later pastor of Holy Cross Parish in Pittsburg (2012–2017), as pastor of Christ the King Parish in Kilgore (2017–2018) and as pastor of St. Charles Borromeo Parish in Frankston (2018–2020).

In addition to his various pastoral roles, Gomez served as the diocesan judge of the diocesan tribunal and adjunct judicial vicar, becoming judicial vicar in 2013 and serving as promoter of justice from 2018 to 2023. Gomez served as vicar general and moderator of the curia for Tyler from 2015–2023 and again from 2025 until his appointment.

== Episcopal career ==
=== Bishop of Laredo ===
On May 1, 2026, Pope Leo XIV appointed Gomez the second Bishop of Laredo. His episcopal consecration occurred on June 30, 2026.

== See also ==
- Catholic Church hierarchy
- Catholic Church in the United States
- Historical list of the Catholic bishops of the United States
- List of Catholic bishops of the United States
- Lists of patriarchs, archbishops, and bishops

Catholic Church titles
Preceded by James Anthony Tamayo	Bishop of Laredo; 2026–present	Succeeded by Incumbent
