= KLUX =

Radio station in Robstown–Corpus Christi, Texas

Robstown, Texas; United States
- Broadcast area: Corpus Christi metropolitan area
- Frequency: 89.5 MHz (HD Radio)
- Branding: Good Company, 89.5 KLUX

Programming
- Format: Catholic; easy listening
- Subchannels: HD2: Relevant Radio

Ownership
- Owner: Diocese of Corpus Christi; (Diocesan Telecommunications Corporation)

History
- First air date: March 13, 1985
- Call sign meaning: Lux means "light" in Latin; station's original motto was "Light of the Coastal Bend"

Technical information
- Licensing authority: FCC
- Facility ID: 16945
- Class: C1
- ERP: 42,000 watts
- HAAT: 291 meters (955 ft)
- Transmitter coordinates: 27°44′30″N 97°36′10″W

Links
- Public license information: Public file; LMS
- Webcast: KLUX; Relevant Radio
- Website: klux.org

KLUX (89.5 FM, "Good Company 89.5") is a non-commercial radio station licensed to Corpus Christi, Texas, United States, featuring a secular, light adult music format. Owned by the Diocesan Telecommunications Corporation, which is in turn part of the Diocese of Corpus Christi, KLUX's studios are located at the Our Lady of Corpus Christi Retreat Center on Lantana Street off Interstate 37. The transmitter is on County Road 34 in Robstown, near Texas State Highway 44.

KLUX also broadcasts Relevant Radio on an HD Radio subchannel.

== History ==
In February 1984, the Diocese of Corpus Christi received construction permits to build new radio stations on 89.5 MHz in Robstown and 88.1 MHz in Laredo, which was then part of the diocese. The names KLUX, with lux meaning "light" in Latin, and KHOY, with hoy meaning "today" in Spanish, were chosen for the new stations. KLUX was also to be known as the "Light of the Coastal Bend". The radio stations project represented part of an ambitious media project for the diocese, known as the Catholic Communications Network, which also included the planned establishment of a television station in Laredo; the diocese already produced television programs for air on public-access cable channels and commercial stations. An $860,000 grant from the John G. and Maria Stella Kenedy Foundation supported their establishment.

KLUX began broadcasting on March 13, 1985, (Note: Most diocesan sources give a March 13 date. One May 1985 article in the Corpus Christi Caller-Times gives a March 18 date.) with a formal dedication ceremony being held at the studios in Robstown in late May. The format consisted of blocks of easy listening music—the diocese hired a company to screen out songs with suggestive or degrading lyrics—as well as religious music at specific times throughout the day and on Sundays, plus Spanish-language programming in the early afternoon hours. Surveys carried out by the diocese indicated that 40 percent of Corpus Christi-area listeners preferred Spanish-language programming. That figure was higher in Laredo, where KHOY began broadcasting on December 17. The studios remained in Robstown until 1989, when it was possible to relocate to the Catholic Communications Network facilities on Lantana Street in Corpus Christi. Also at that time, the station increased power from 3,000 watts and adopted its current music format throughout the day, with the exception of Sundays, when it airs the Mass from Corpus Christi Cathedral as well as several local talk programs.

From its beginning, KLUX has employed a "velvet hammer approach to promoting Christianity", in the words of Marty Wind, longtime station manager, who noted that it helped the station reach a larger audience than a traditional Christian outlet. On at least one occasion, the Christianity soft sell was so soft that the station was heard as hold music for callers to Corpus Christi city hall until a city official heard a message "about the evils of fornication and masturbation". In the 1990s, the diocese made an incursion into for-profit broadcasting with the establishment of Paloma Communications, which owned Fox affiliate K47DF "KDF" and Telemundo station K68DJ "KAJA". This lasted from 1990 to 1997, when the firm filed for bankruptcy and sold the stations.

In 2006, KLUX began HD Radio broadcasting, making it the first such station in the Coastal Bend area, airing Catholic talk and preaching programming on its new HD2 subchannel.
