= Diocese of Brownsville =

Latin Catholic jurisdiction in the US

Diocese of Brownsville Dioecesis Brownsvillensis Diócesis de Brownsville
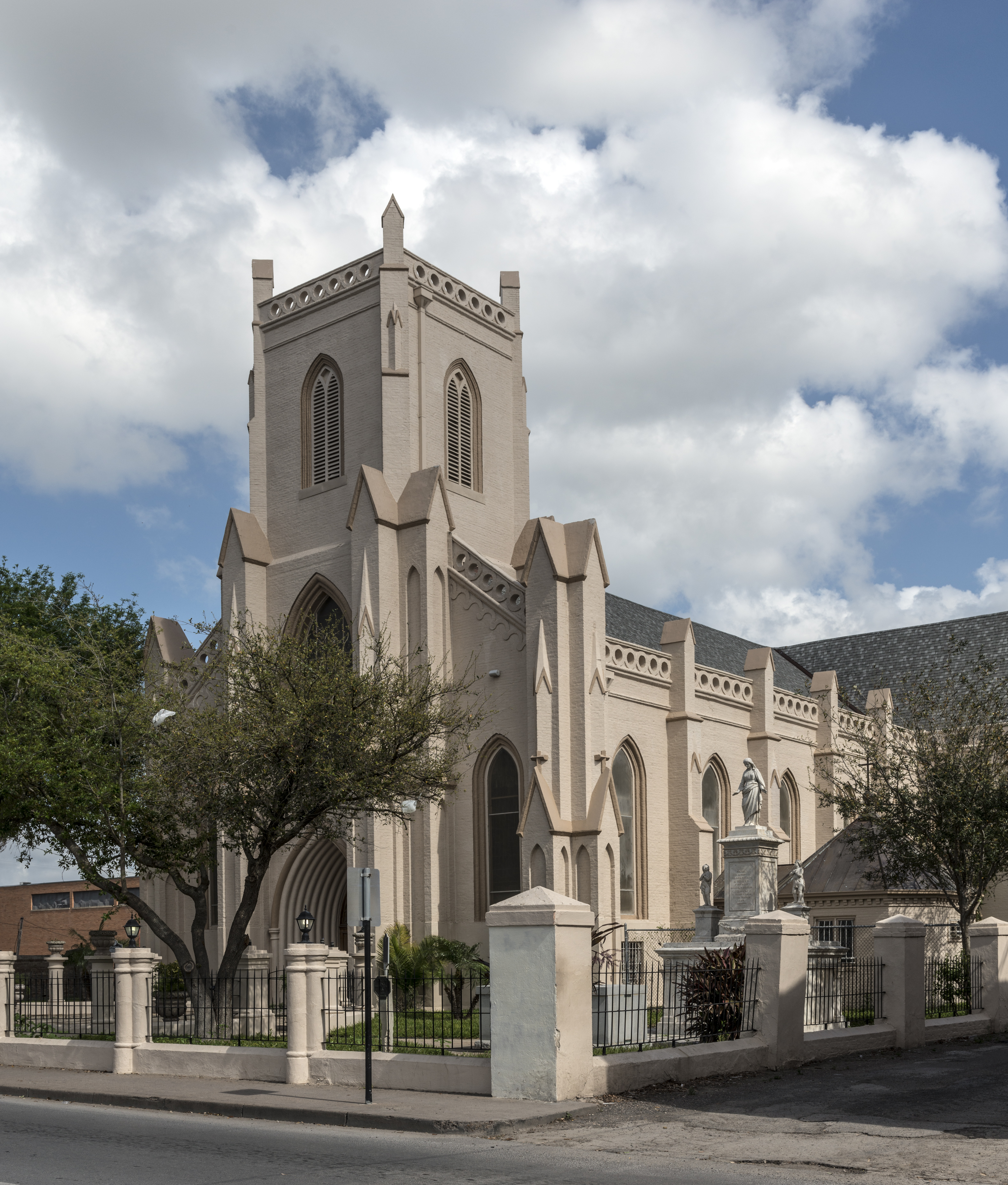
- Immaculate Conception Cathedral

- Coat of arms

Location
- Country: United States
- Territory: Counties of Starr, Willacy, Hidalgo, and Cameron counties in Southern Texas
- Ecclesiastical province: Galveston-Houston
- Coordinates: 25°55′49″N 97°29′04″W

Statistics
- Area: 4,226 sq mi (10,950 km^{2})
- Population: Total; Catholics: (as of 2020); 1,377,861; 1,171,182 (85.0%)
- Parishes: 72

Information
- Denomination: Catholic
- Sui iuris church: Latin Church
- Rite: Roman Rite
- Established: July 10, 1965
- Cathedral: Immaculate Conception Cathedral

Current leadership
- Pope: Leo XIV
- Bishop: Daniel E. Flores
- Metropolitan Archbishop: Joe S. Vásquez

Map
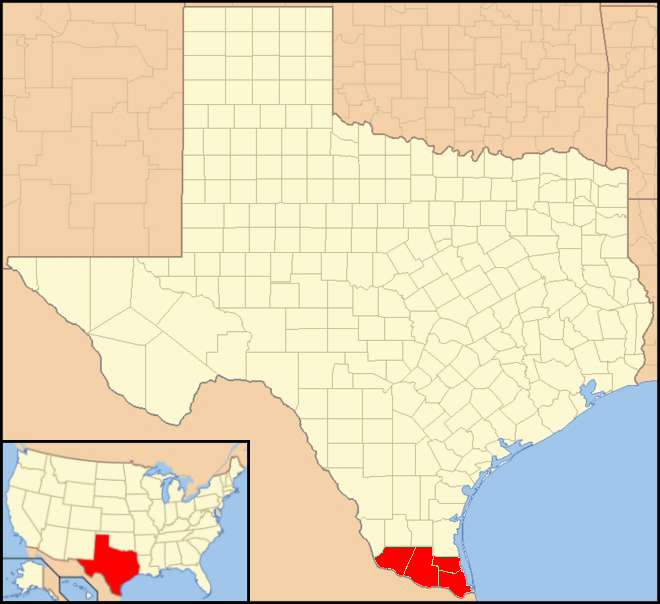

Website
- cdob.org

The Diocese of Brownsville (Latin: Dioecesis Brownsvillensis, Spanish: Diócesis de Brownsville), erected in 1965, is a diocese in southeastern Texas in the United States. It is a suffragan diocese in the ecclesiastical province of the Metropolitan Archdiocese of Galveston-Houston. The bishop is Daniel E. Flores. The cathedral church is Immaculate Conception Cathedral in Brownsville.

== Territory ==
The Diocese of Brownsville encompasses 4,226 square miles and serves more than one million Catholics across 69 parishes and 45 mission churches. It comprises the counties of Cameron, Hidalgo, Starr, and Willacy.

== Statistics ==
As of 2023, the Diocese of Brownsville served 1,181,287 Catholics (85.0% of 1,389,750 total) on 111,125 km^{2} in 72 parishes, 44 missions, 108 priests (85 diocesan, 23 religious), 103 deacons, 72 lay religious (12 brothers, 60 nuns), and 12 seminarians.

The diocese has the second highest percentage of Catholics to total diocese population in the United States, second only to the Diocese of Laredo. As of 2020, the Diocese of Brownsville comprised 1,171,182 Catholics out of a total population of 1,377,861, or 85.0%.

== History ==
=== 1690 to 1900 ===
The first Catholic mission in Texas, then part of the Spanish Empire, was San Francisco de los Tejas. It was founded by Franciscan Father Damián Massanet in 1690 in the Weches area. The priests left the mission after three years, then established a second mission, Nuestro Padre San Francisco de los Tejas, near present-day Alto in 1716.At the conclusion of the Mexican War of Independence in 1821, Texas became part of Mexico.

In 1839, after the 1836 founding of the Texas Republic, Pope Gregory XVI erected the prefecture apostolic of Texas, covering the republic. In 1847, the vicariate became the Diocese of Galveston.Four priest of the Missionary Oblates of Mary Immaculate arrived in Beaumont in 1849. Ten years later, the Church of the Immaculate Conception was dedicated, the first in that city

A French merchant in 1865 constructed the La Lomita Chapel in Mission, bequeathing it in 1871 to the Oblates.In 1874, Pope Pius IX established the Vicariate Apostolic of Brownsville out of the Diocese of Galveston. The new vicariate included all the settlements south of the Nueces River to the Río Grande River.

=== 1900 to 1980 ===
The Oblates in 1911 built a chapel in McAllen. By 1917, it had become the first parish in that community. In 1912, Pope Pius X erected the Diocese of Corpus Christi, which included the Brownsville area. During the 1910s, the Mexican Revolution drove many sick refugees into Brownsville. To help them, the Sisters of Charity opened Divine Providence Hospital, the first hospital in Brownsville, in 1917. It later became part of Valley Baptist Medical Center–Brownsville.

Pope Paul VI erected the Diocese of Brownsville on July 10, 1965, taking its territory from the Diocese of Corpus Christi. That same year, the pope appointed Adolph Marx of Corpus Christi as the first bishop of Brownsville. Immaculate Conception Church was elevated to Immaculate Conception Cathedral. Marx died in November 1965; Paul VI in April 1966 named Humberto Medeiros of the Diocese of Fall River as Marx's replacement.

Medeiros' appointment came at the time of a threatened farm workers' strike in the region. Many of his parishioners were Mexican-American migrant workers. Medeiros acted as an advocate on their behalf, supporting their demands for a minimum wage at $1.25 an hour from growers. During his tenure in Brownsville, Medeiros sold the episcopal limousine, converted all but one room of the episcopal residence into a dormitory for visiting priests, and traveled with migrant workers to celebrate mass in the fields during the harvest season. He also spent Christmas Days and Easters visiting prisoners in Texas jails.

In 1970, Paul VI named Medeiros as archbishop of the Archdiocese of Boston. Auxiliary Bishop John Fitzpatrick from the Archdiocese of Miami replaced Medeiros in 1971 in Brownsville.

=== 1980 to 2000 ===
In 1982, Fitzpatrick opened Casa Oscar Romero in Brownsville, named after the murdered Salvadorian archbishop, Oscar Romero. It served as a shelter for refugees coming across the Mexican border into the United States. He eventually closed Casa Oscar Romero after repeated complaints from federal judges that the diocese was violating federal immigration law. Fitzpatrick set up a different shelter and even opened his own garage to refugees. As bishop, he set up an extensive program to train lay people to assume roles within the diocese. He also established diocesan radio and TV stations.

Auxiliary Bishop Enrique San Pedro of the Diocese of Galveston-Houston was appointed in August 1991 by Pope John Paul II as coadjutor bishop of Brownsville to assist Fitzpatrick. After Fitzpatrick retired as bishop of Brownsville in November 1991, San Pedro became bishop of Brownsville. He died in 1994 after less than three years in office. Bishop Raymundo Peña of the Diocese of El Paso succeeded him in 1995.

=== 2000 to 2020 ===
In 2003, the diocese and the United Farm Workers of America settled a lawsuit over five workers who were fired from Holy Spirit Parish in McAllen and Sacred Heart Parish in Hidalgo. Peña retired as bishop of Brownsville in December 2009. In 2004, the Dallas Morning News published a report on sexual abuse accusations against Basil Onyia, a Nigerian priest who had arrived in Brownsville in 1999. The diocese had assigned Onyia as assistant pastor of the Basilica of Our Lady of San Juan del Valle. By early 2000, the diocese was receiving complaints from Basilica staff and parishioners about inappropriate behavior by Onyia towards women and girls. In April 2000, after a woman filed a police complaint, Peña transferred Onyia to a parish in Harlingen. In late 2000, two priests urged Peña to send Onyia back to Nigeria. In January 2001, Peña asked Onyia's bishop in Nigeria to recall him. In February 2001, the relatives of a developmentally disabled girl accused Onyia of abuse. Peña ordered Onyia to a third parish, but Onyia fled to Nigeria that same month. The Vatican laicized him in 2016.

Auxiliary Bishop Daniel E. Flores from the Archdiocese of Detroit was named bishop of Brownsville by Pope Benedict XVI in December 2009. Deacon Ronaldo Chavez, a school principal, was arrested in January 2014 on charges of sexually abusing a 15-year-old boy multiple times in 2013. Chavez later pleaded guilty and was sentenced to seven years in prison.

In November 2018, the diocese sued the Trump Administration. The diocese claimed that the proposed section of border wall with Mexico would cut off access to La Lomita Chapel, located on diocesan property in Mission. The diocese maintained that the federal government was violating the diocese's First Amendment rights under the US Constitution. In February 2019, the US Congress amended an existing appropriations bill to prohibit new funding for any border barriers at La Lomita.

The diocese in February 2019 released a list of 13 priests with credible accusations of sexual abuse. The City of McAllen in 2019 ordered the diocese to move the Respite Center of Catholic Charities of the Rio Grande Valley from its current location in a residential neighborhood. The Center, which provided services to asylum seekers, had been the focus of complaints from neighbors. The city allowed the center to relocate in downtown McAllen.

=== 2020 to present ===
Texas Attorney General Kenneth Paxton sued the Catholic Charities of the Rio Grande Valley (CCRGV) in February 2024, claiming that the charity was harboring illegal aliens and operating a stash house in violation of the Texas Penal Code. CCRGV stated that it cared for immigrants who had been released by the U.S. Customs and Border Protection. In January 2024, the U.S. Department of Homeland Security suspended grant funding to CCRGV, claiming violations of federal grants.

As of 2025, Flores is the current bishop of Brownsville.

== Bishops ==
=== Bishops of Brownsville ===
1. Adolph Marx (1965)
2. Humberto Sousa Medeiros (1966-1970), appointed Archbishop of Boston (cardinal in 1973)
3. John Joseph Fitzpatrick (1971-1991)
4. Enrique San Pedro (1991-1994; coadjutor archbishop 1991)
5. Raymundo Joseph Peña (1994-2009)
6. Daniel E. Flores (2010–present)

=== Auxiliary bishop ===
Mario Alberto Avilés (2018–2025)

=== Other diocesan priest who became bishop ===
Joseph Patrick Delaney, appointed Bishop of Fort Worth in 1981

== Education ==
As of 2026, the Diocese of Brownsville has six elementary schools, one middle school and two high schools.

=== High schools ===
- Saint Joseph Academy – Brownsville
- Juan Diego Academy – Mission

== Public broadcasting ==
The diocese's radio and television stations are operated under the license name of RGV Educational Broadcasting, Inc.

- KJJF 88.9 FM and KHID 88.1 FM - NPR-member stations
