= Pontifical College of St. Pius X =

- Type: Seminary
- Established: 1958
- Religious affiliation: Catholic Church
- Location: Da Lat, Vietnam

Pontifical College St. Pius X is a Roman Catholic seminary in Da Lat, Vietnam. The college was modeled on the Pontifical College of Rome. Seminarians were sourced from all over the country as a group of future teachers who later would return to their own parish to join ministries of the local Church.The College took seminarians from the Southern provinces such as Long Xuyen, Cantho, Vinh Long to the Central provinces such as Kong Tum and Hue. Some seminarians came from Laos and Cambodia.

== Early history ==
Father Ferdinand Lacretelle in 1957 has founded a missionary centre in the capital of Vietnam. To further his work, Father Lacretelle also continued his teaching in Dalat. At the same time, the congregation of Vietnamese Catholic Bishops felt the need of a special training institute in Vietnam, but with the model based on a Pontifical College from Rome.

The college was open on the 13 of September 1958. At that time, the teaching staff was numbered at 4 and the seminarians were 24. The original name of the College was “ Seminarium Pontificale Immaculati Cordis B.M.V “. it was later changed to " Collegium Pontificium Sancti Pii X ”.

== The Architecture of the College ==
During the 1960s to the 70s, the College does not boasts a sequence of architectural styles in Baroque or Modernist fashion, but it was a complete integrated structure, designed to be integrated into the green hills of the surrounding areas. As a cultural institution of Dalat, the College has been an icon in the history of Dalat City because of its prominent status and because of its elevated location. Looking from a bird eye view, the entire plan of the College sits on a hill, like a flower with 3 petals. In the middle was the chapel. Surrounded by smaller hills leading to Ho Xuan Huong Lake. The design is unique in its location and climatic setting, with vista of pine trees and rolling greens. The design also took advantages of the unhique landscape of Dalat, with its misty view of mountain tops and undulating valleys below.

In the 1980s until 2010, due to the chaotic sequence of demolition and redevelopment around the College, the landscape was oppressed by urban encroaching, followed by a loss of architectural values. Today nearly all of the buildings with historical values of the College were destroyed/or partially destroyed and so Dalat city has lost a significant portion of its architectural history.

The original teaching staff of the College used to be of various nationalities, mostly Jesuits, Canadian, German, Italian, French, Spanish. Chinese. On the 28th of August 1975, all Jesuit priests and other foreigners were asked to leave the country within 48 hours. They left behind Father Michel Martin in Hue, Ramón Cavanna in Saigon, Jean Motte and Anton Drexel in Dalat, in their resting place. They left the College as friends, teachers and leaders ( Father De Diego S.J) and adventurers ( Father Deslierres S.J). Up to 1987, the Jesuits also left behind other assets to a program of nationalization, including Pontifical College St.Pius X of Dalat (13 Dinh Tien Hoang) currently living quarters for hospital staff and for the Da Lat Nuclear Research. They also lost the Jesuit Academy (09 Co Giang), which is now the area of physiotherapy, and the rest of Dac Lo Centre (161 Ly Chinh Thang, Ho Chi Minh City), their Region Headquarters of Jesuit Superiors (now Tran Quoc Toan), the Jesuit novitiate (Thu Duc). The landscape has changed immensely for the College regarding its teaching staff as well as its architectural and landscape values.

== Teaching ==
The teaching at the College was conducted by the Jesuits. The curriculum consists of a 3 years course in philosophy, followed by one year of mission work in the parishes, then a 4 years course in theology.

During the undergraduate years, seminarians learn the ancient language courses such as Latin and Greek, or Chinese. Other subjects may included, as taken from the prospectus of 1974-1975 :

1. Introduction to Ancient Philosophy ( Plato, Aristotle) -
2. Modern Philosophy ( Descartes, Leibniz, Spinoza)
3. Modern Philosophy ( Locke, Berkeley, Hume)
4. German Philosophy ( Idealism, Kant, Hegel)
5. Introduction to Logic – Aristotlean Syllogism
6. History of Salvation
7. Introduction to Psychology - Psychoanalysis
8. Chinese Philosophy – Hinduism – Islam
9. Continental Philosophy – Structuralism
10. Theories of Ethics
11. Introduction to Moral Theology
12. Cosmology
13. Church History
14. Theodicy - History and Arguments

After a year working in the parish, seminarians returned to begin the first of 4 years in theology. They must complete course work in systematic theology, biblical theology – Ancient Testament, New Testament theology, patristics, homiletics and ministry practice. The end of year requires a thesis ( such as a thesis on Karl Barth, Hans Kung or Gustavo Gutiérrez). Others may included thesis on the Epistle to the Romans or on a supervised topic in Church pastoral theology.

A notable teacher at the College was Bishop Enrique San Pedro.

Academic staff from 1958 to 1975 included more than 60 Jesuit teachers. The college has 5 generations of Rectors including:

- Fernandus Lacretelle (1958–1960),
- Franciscus Burkhardt (1960–1962),
- Paulinus (Paul) W. O'Brien, S.J. Paulus W.O’Brien (1962-1965),
- Josephus Raviolo (1965–1972),
- Josephus Ramon de Diego (1972–1975).
