= Juan Diego Academy =

Location
- 5208 South FM 494; Mission, Texas 78572; United States
- 26°8′10″N 98°18′17″W

Information
- Type: Private, coeducational
- Motto: Justice + Devotion + Action
- Religious affiliation: Roman Catholic
- Established: 2011
- Principal: Kathleen Carroll
- Grades: 9–12
- Colors: Green and white
- Athletics conference: TAPPS
- Sports: Boys/girls basketball, soccer, volleyball, track, golf, tennis
- Mascot: Lion
- Team name: Lions
- Accreditation: Southern Association of Colleges and Schools
- Tuition: $10000
- Website: http://www.juandiegoacademy.org/

Juan Diego Academy is a private, Catholic school in Mission, Texas, United States. The school is located in the Roman Catholic Diocese of Brownsville.

== History ==
Juan Diego Academy was founded in 2011 after several years of planning and fundraising. The original school buildings were the site of St. Joseph and St. Peter Seminary. In 2018, the United States government announced its intentions to acquire land near the school from the Brownsville Diocese through eminent domain in order to build additional border fencing.
