= Enrique San Pedro =

Cuban American Catholic prelate (1926–1994)

His Excellency, The Most Reverend Enrique San Pedro SJ
- Bishop of Brownsville
- Church: Catholic
- Diocese: Brownsville
- Appointed: August 13, 1991 (as Coadjutor)
- Installed: November 30, 1991
- Term ended: July 17, 1994
- Predecessor: John Joseph Fitzpatrick
- Successor: Raymundo Joseph Peña
- Previous post: Auxiliary Bishop of Galveston-Houston & Titular Bishop of Siccesi (1986–1991)

Orders
- Ordination: March 18, 1957 by William Brasseur
- Consecration: June 29, 1986 by Joseph Fiorenza

Personal details
- Born: Enrique San Pedro y Fonaguera; 9 March 1926 Havana, Cuba
- Died: 17 July 1994 (aged 68) Miami, Florida, US
- Education: Comillas Pontifical University; Pontifical Biblical Institute; University of Innsbruck
- Motto: Libentissime impendam et super impendar (Latin for 'Most gladly I will spend myself and be spent for your sakes')

Enrique San Pedro y Fonaguera (March 9, 1926 – July 17, 1994) was a Cuban-born American Catholic prelate who served as the fourth bishop of Brownsville in Texas from 1991 until his death in 1994 and previously as an auxiliary bishop of the Diocese of Galveston-Houston from 1986 to 1991. San Pedro was a member of the Society of Jesus (Jesuits).

== Biography ==
=== Early life ===
Enrique San Pedro y Fonaguera was born on March 9, 1926, in Havana, Cuba, the second child and oldest son of María Antonia Fornaguera and Enrique San Pedro y Xiques. His siblings were Silvia, Berta, and Javier.

San Pedro studied at Colegio de Belén in Havana and then entered the novitiate of the Jesuits at Escuela Apostólica y Seminario Menor in Sagua la Grande on December 7, 1941. After two years of novitiate, he underwent four years of Greek and Latin studies in Havana and in Salamanca, Spain, where he received a master's degree in classical literature. These studies were followed by three years of philosophy at Comillas Pontifical University in Madrid. San Pedro was sent to Manila, Philippines to study Mandarin, Tagalog, and Vietnamese. While there, he also taught social sciences and Latin at a Jesuit school in the Philippines. San Pedro also studied theology in Baguio.

=== Priesthood ===
San Pedro was ordained a priest by Bishop William Brasseur for the Jesuits on March 18, 1957. He continued his studies at the Pontifical Biblical Institute in Rome and received his doctorate in sacred scripture from the University of Innsbruck, Austria. He spoke seven languages, wrote two books, and published some professional articles and book reviews.

After finishing his education, the Jesuits sent San Pedro to what was then South Vietnam to teach at the Pius X Pontifical College in Da Lat. He also worked at the Student Center of St. Francisco Javier in Huế. In 1975, after the Fall of Saigon, he was banished from Vietnam by the Communist government. During the period he was in Vietnam, he acted as a liaison between the Bishops' Conference and the clergy.

San Pedro came to the United States in the late 1970s. He travelled to Miami, Florida, to visit his parents and stayed as assistant pastor at St. Raymond's Parish in that city. He taught classes at Belen Jesuit Preparatory School in Miami periodically from 1977 to 1986. He also worked as a visiting professor at St. Vincent de Paul Regional Seminary in Boynton Beach and at the Jesuit seminary in the Dominican Republic (1976–1977). In 1978, San Pedro requested to be a missionary once again, and he was sent to Suva, Fiji, for two years.

=== Auxiliary Bishop of Galveston-Houston ===
On April 1, 1986, San Pedro was appointed by Pope John Paul II as an auxiliary bishop of Galveston-Houston and titular bishop of Siccesi. He was consecrated at the Albert Thomas Convention Center in Houston, Texas, on June 29, 1986, by Bishop Joseph Fiorenza. His co-consecrators were Archbishop Edward McCarthy and Bishop Agustin Roman. San Pedro took his motto from II Corinthians, I2, 15: Libentissime impendam et super impendar (Most gladly I will spend myself and be spent for your sakes).

=== Coadjutor Bishop and Bishop of Brownsville ===
San Pedro was appointed on August 13, 1991, by John Paul II as coadjutor bishop of the Diocese of Brownsville. He was installed as bishop on September 26, 1991. On November 30, 1991, San Pedro succeeded as the fourth bishop of Brownsville.

=== Death and legacy ===
Enrique San Pedro died in Miami on July 17, 1994, at age 68. He is buried at Our Lady of Mercy Cemetery in Miami.

The Diocese of Brownsville named a homeless shelter after him, the Bishop Enrique San Pedro Ozanam Center. Additionally, a Spanish service club in Belen Jesuit Preparatory School in Miami is named after him.

== Episcopal succession ==
Catholic Church titles
Preceded by John Joseph Fitzpatrick	Bishop of Brownsville; 1991–1994	Succeeded by Raymundo Joseph Peña
Preceded by –	Auxiliary Bishop of Galveston-Houston; 1986–1991	Succeeded by –
