= Diocese of Laredo =

Latin Catholic jurisdiction in the US

Coordinates: 27°31′28″N 99°29′26″W

Diocese of Laredo Dioecesis Laredanus Diócesis de Laredo
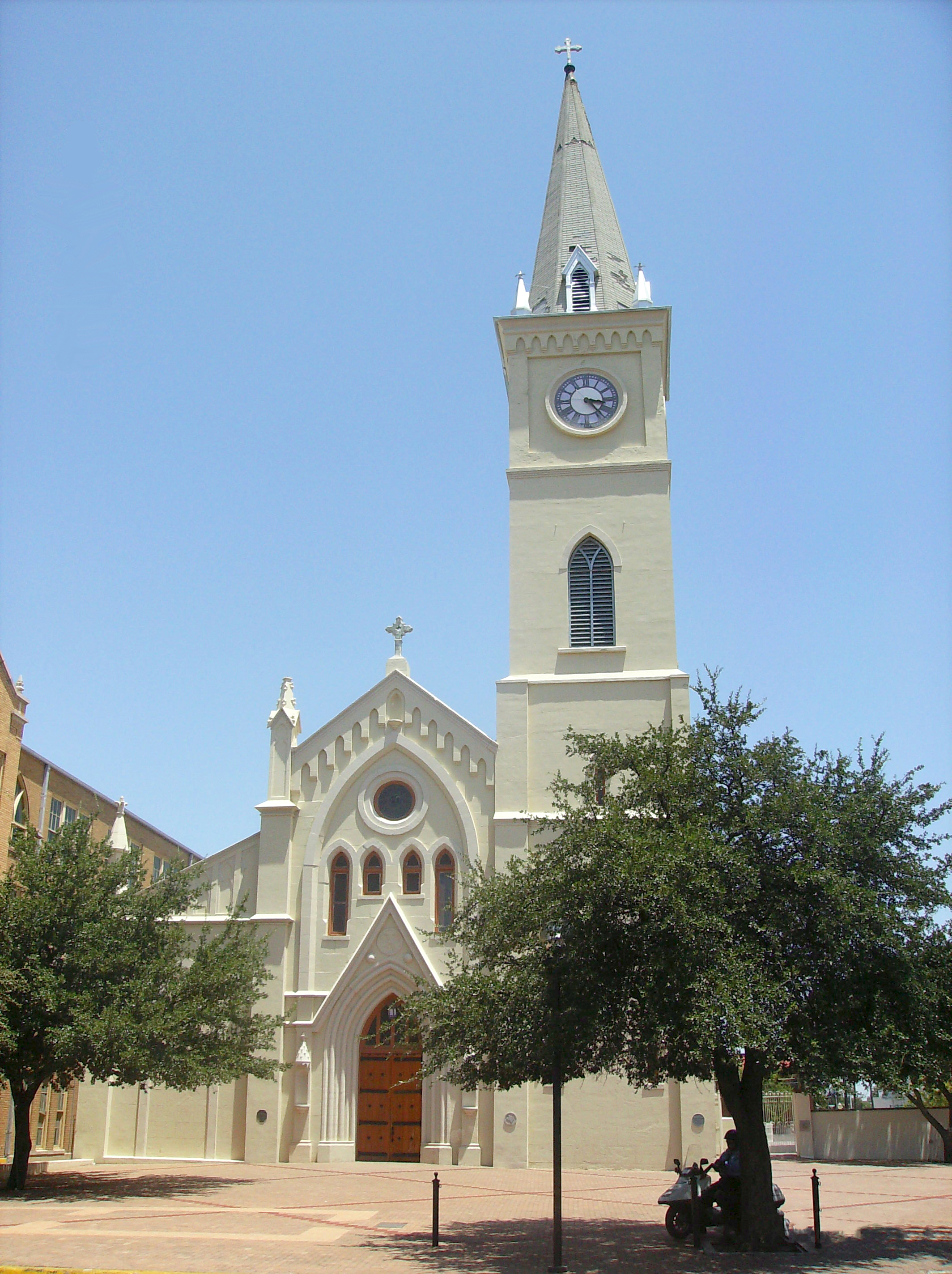
- San Agustin Cathedral

- Coat of arms

Location
- Country: United States
- Territory: Texas counties of Dimmit, Jim Hogg, La Salle, Maverick, Webb, Zapata, and Zavala
- Ecclesiastical province: San Antonio

Statistics
- Area: 10,614 sq mi (27,490 km^{2})
- Population: Total; Catholics: (as of 2023); ▼360,998; ▼328,508 ( 91%)
- Parishes: 32 (2023)

Information
- Denomination: Catholic
- Sui iuris church: Latin Church
- Rite: Roman Rite
- Established: July 3, 2000
- Cathedral: Cathedral of San Agustin
- Patron saint: Saint Augustine of Hippo
- Secular priests: ▲41 diocesan; ▼16 religious; ▲44 deacons (2023)

Current leadership
- Pope: Leo XIV
- Bishop: John Jairo Gomez
- Metropolitan Archbishop: Gustavo Garcia-Siller
- Vicar General: Anthony Mendoza
- Bishops emeritus: James Anthony Tamayo

Map
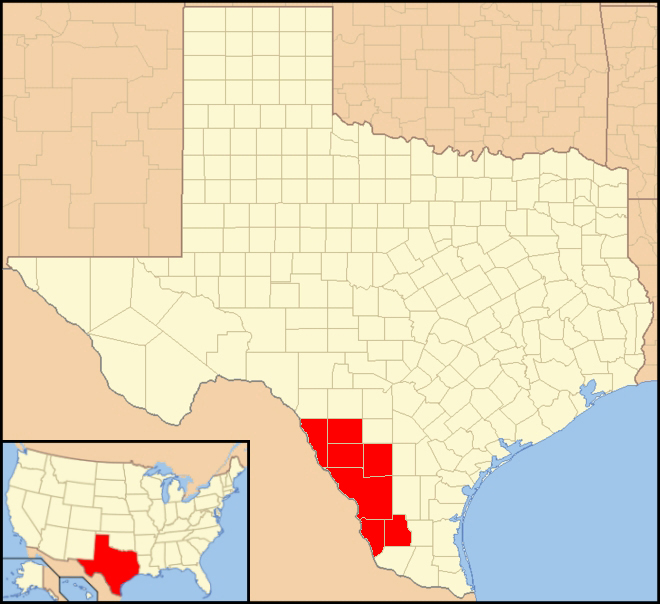

Website
- www.dioceseoflaredo.org

The Diocese of Laredo (Latin: Dioecesis Laredanus, Spanish: Diócesis de Laredo) is a diocese of the Catholic Church in South Texas in the United States. Founded in 2000, it is a suffragan diocese of the metropolitan Archdiocese of San Antonio. The San Agustin Cathedral in Laredo is the mother church of the diocese. John Jairo Gomez is the bishop.

== Statistics ==
The diocese covers an area of 10,905 sq. mi with 32 parishes and 17 missions. It includes Dimmit, Jim Hogg, La Salle, Maverick, Webb, Zapata, and Zavala counties of Texas.

As of 2023, the diocese had 328,508 members with 41 diocesan priests, 16 religious priests and 44 permanent deacons.

== History ==
=== Name Changes ===
The Laredo area has been divided under several different Catholic jurisdictions since 1777. The Diocese of Linares o Nueva León was under Spanish, then Mexican control. All of the succeeding vicariates and dioceses were American.

- Diocese of Linares o Nueva León (1777 to 1839)
- Prefecture Apostolic of Texas (1839 to 1841)
- Vicariate Apostolic of Texas (1841 to 1847)
- Diocese of Galveston (1847 to 1974)
- Vicariate Apostolic of Brownsville (1874 to 1912)
- Diocese of Corpus Christi (1912 to 2000)
- Diocese of San Antonio (1874 to 2000)
- Diocese of Laredo (2000 to present)

=== 1700 to 1900 ===
During the 18th century, the Laredo area was part of a province of New Spain, a colony of the Spanish Empire. Five years after the founding of San Agustin de Laredo in 1755, its residents petitioned the Diocese of Guadalajara to provide them with a mission.

In 1759, Bishop Francisco de San Buena Ventura of Guadalajara visited the town. The next year, he sent a resident priest to Laredo to construct a small mission chapel. In 1778, a stone church was erected to accommodate over two hundred families. In 1789, San Agustin parish was established in Laredo by the diocese.

Immaculate Heart of Mary Parish was erected in 1898 in Encinal. The first English-speaking parish in Laredo, St. Peter, was established in 1897.

=== 1900 to present ===
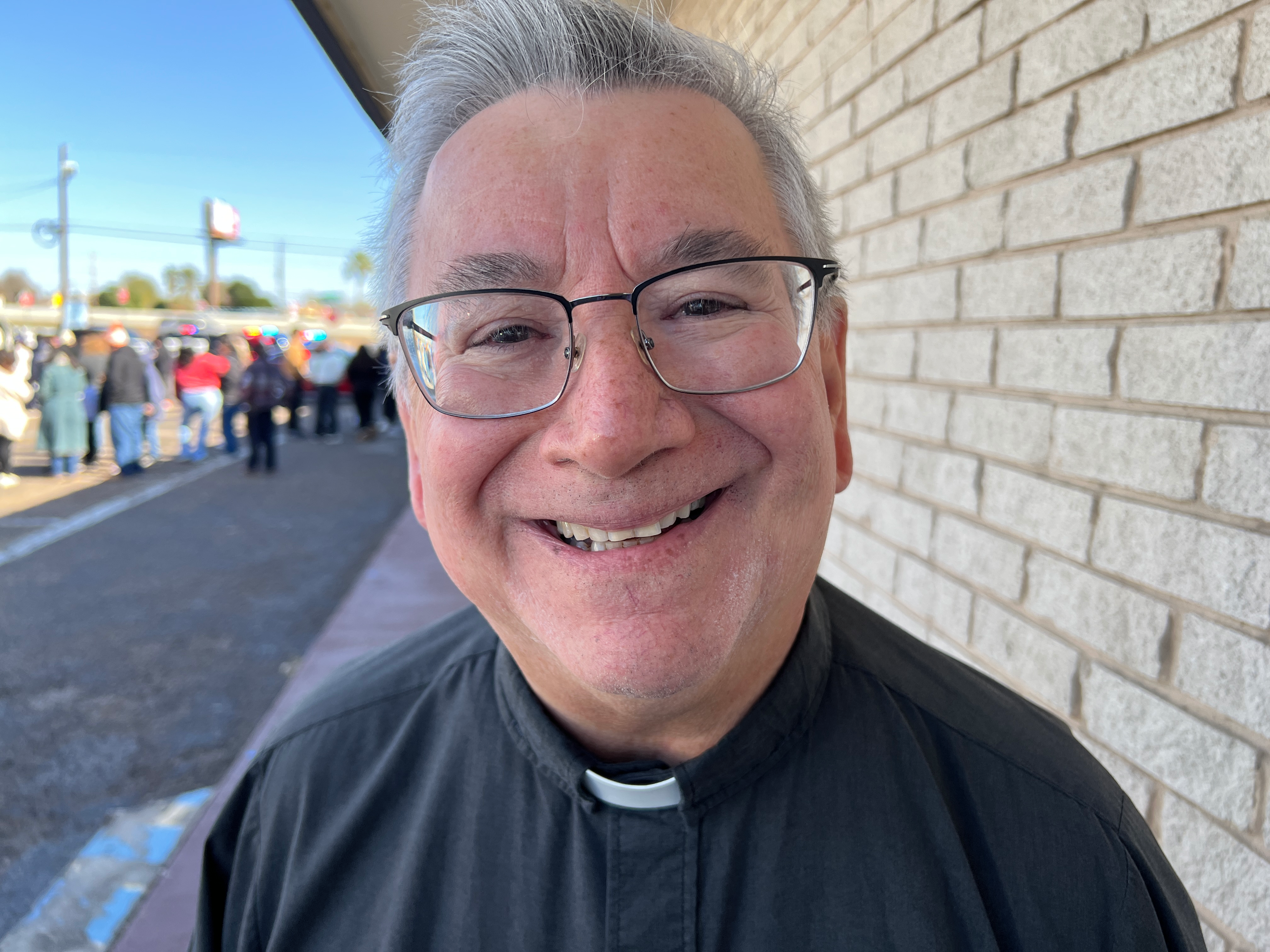
Bishop Tamayo (2025)

During the Mexican Revolution between 1910 and 1920, many Mexican Catholics fled their country to avoid persecution. At one point, 14 Mexican archbishops and bishops were taking refuge in Laredo. Franciscan priests from Mexico established Scotus College in Hebbronville in 1926. The Laredo Pastoral Center was established in 1984 and the Western Vicariate in 1990.

On July 3, 2000, the Diocese of Laredo was created by Pope John Paul II, with territory taken from the Diocese of Corpus Christi and the Archdiocese of San Antonio. The pope named Auxiliary Bishop James Tamayo of the Diocese of Galveston-Houston as the first bishop.

In March 2016, Tamayo halted the construction of a Catholic student center at Texas A&M International University (TAMIU) in Laredo. The Brothers of St. John, key sponsors of the $4 million-plus project, had held a groundbreaking ceremony in November 2013. Tamayo did not attend the groundbreaking.

On May 1, 2026, Pope Leo XIV accepted Tamayo's resignation (which he had submitted on his 75th birthday as all bishops are required to do per Canon law) and named Diocese of Tyler priest John Jairo Gomez as the second and new Bishop of Laredo; Gomez is set to be installed on June 30.

=== Sex abuse ===
Cyriacus Udegbulem, a priest in bad standing, had worked in Laredo Diocese as a hospital chaplain. On being informed of his background, the Diocese of Laredo dismissed Udegbulem as chaplain in 2001. The alleged victim in New York then decided to press charges against him. After being extradited to New York, Udegbulem went on trial in 2003. The trial ended in June 2003 with a hung jury.

In February 2019, Bishop Tamayo announced that there had been no accusations from the Laredo area against diocesan priests since the founding of the diocese in 2000.

== Bishops ==
1. James Anthony Tamayo (2000–2026)
2. John Jairo Gomez (2026-present)

== Parishes ==
Parishes of the Diocese of Laredo that came from the Archdiocese of San Antonio.

- Immaculate Conception – Asherton (1918)
- Our Lady of Guadalupe – Carrizo Springs (1881)
- Our Lady of Refuge – Eagle Pass (1859)
- Sacred Heart – Cotulla (1882)
- Sacred Heart – Crystal City (1917)
- Sacred Heart – Eagle Pass (1966)
- St. Joseph – Eagle Pass (1967)
- St. Joseph – La Pryor (1917)

== Schools ==
=== High school ===
As of 2025, there is one high school in the diocese.

Saint Augustine High School – Laredo, diocesan (1927)

=== Elementary and middle schools ===
As of 2025, there are four elementary and middle schools in the diocese:

- Blessed Sacrament School – Laredo, diocesan (1960)
- Mary Help of Christians School – Laredo, private (1935) operated by the Salesian Sisters
- Our Lady of Refuge School – Eagle Pass, diocesan (1883)
- St Augustine Elementary/Middle School – Laredo, diocesan (1928)

== Media ==
- La Fe magazine
- KHOY radio
