= Emmanuel Boleslaus Ledvina =

American prelate

His Excellency, The Most Reverend Emmanuel Boleslaus Ledvina
- Bishop of Corpus Christi; Titular Bishop of Pitanae
- Church: Roman Catholic Church
- See: Diocese of Corpus Christi
- Predecessor: Paul Joseph Nussbaum
- Successor: Mariano Simon Garriga
- Other post: Titular Bishop of Pitanae

Orders
- Ordination: March 18, 1893 by Silas Chatard
- Consecration: June 14, 1921 by Joseph Chartrand

Personal details
- Born: October 28, 1868 Evansville, Indiana, US
- Died: December 15, 1952 (aged 84) Corpus Christi, Texas, US
- Education: St. Meinrad's College
- Motto: In Domino confido (In God we trust)

Emmanuel Boleslaus Ledvina (October 28, 1868 – December 15, 1952) was an American prelate of the Roman Catholic Church. He served as bishop of the Diocese of Corpus Christi in Texas from 1921 to 1949.

== Biography ==
=== Early life ===
Emmanuel Ledvina was born on October 28, 1868, in Evansville, Indiana, to George Emmanuel and Mary (née Kiefer) Ledvina. His father was a native of Bohemia, and worked as an architect and construction engineer. After attending parochial schools in Evansville and St. Louis, Missouri, Emmanuel Ledvina returned to Indiana and entered St. Meinrad's College in St. Meinrad, Indiana, in 1883.

=== Priesthood ===
Ledvina was ordained to the priesthood for the Diocese of Vincennes by Bishop Silas Chatard on March 18, 1893. Ledvina then served as a curate at Holy Trinity Parish in Evansville and afterwards at St. John's Pro-Cathedral in Indianapolis, Indiana. From 1895 to 1907, he was pastor of St. Joseph's Parish in Princeton, Indiana. Ledvina became vice-president and general secretary of the Catholic Church Extension Society in Chicago, Illinois, in 1907. The Vatican named Ledvina as a domestic prelate in 1918 and an honorary canon of the Basilica of Our Lady of Guadalupe in Mexico City in 1919.

=== Bishop of Corpus Christi ===
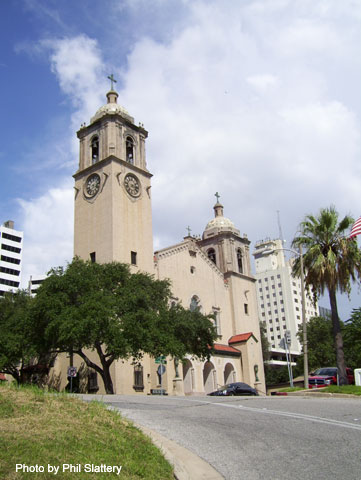
Corpus Christi Cathedral, Corpus Christi, Texas (2012)

On April 30, 1921, Ledvina was appointed the second bishop of Corpus Christi by Pope Benedict XV. He received his episcopal consecration at St. Mary Church in St. Mary of the Woods, Indiana, on June 14, 1921, from Bishop Joseph Chartrand, with Bishops Cornelius Van de Ven and Joseph Lynch serving as co-consecrators. He was installed at Corpus Christi on July 12, 1921.

During his tenure as bishop, Ledvina increased the number of priests in the diocese from 32 to 160, and erected over 50 churches, 53 mission chapels, and 47 rectories. The Vatican elevated Ledvina to the rank of assistant at the pontifical throne in 1931. He constructed Corpus Christi Cathedral in 1940, and a chancery office in 1947. He invited the Benedictine monks of Subiaco Abbey to establish a community in the diocese and staff a new high school. He also became known for his efforts among Mexican-American Catholics in South Texas and for his opposition to the Ku Klux Klan.

=== Retirement and death ===
On March 15, 1949, Pope Pius XII accepted Ledvina's resignation as bishop of Corpus Christi for health reasons and appointed him as titular bishop of Pitanae. Emmanuel Ledvina died in Corpus Christi on December 15, 1952, at age 84. He is buried in a crypt under the main altar of Corpus Christi Cathedral.

== Episcopal succession ==
Catholic Church titles
Preceded by Paul Joseph Nussbaum, C.P.	Bishop of Corpus Christi; 1921–1949	Succeeded by Mariano Simon Garriga
