= St. John Paul II Academy – High School (Corpus Christi, Texas) =

School in Corpus Christi, Texas, United States

St. John Paul II Academy - High School

Location
- 3036 Saratoga Boulevard; Corpus Christi, (Nueces County), Texas 78415; United States; 27°42′35″N 97°25′49″W

Information
- School type: Private, Coeducational Catholic (Diocesan)
- Motto: Fides ∙ Ratio ∙ Virtus (Faith ∙ Reason ∙ Virtue)
- Religious affiliation: Roman Catholic
- Patron saint: Immaculate Conception / St. Pope John Paul II
- Established: August 1, 2006
- Founder: The Most Reverend Edmond Carmody, D.D.
- Sister school: St. John Paul II Academy - Middle School (formerly Bishop Garriga Middle Preparatory School)
- Authority: Roman Catholic Diocese of Corpus Christi
- School code: 441504
- President: Fr. Peter Martinez
- Principal: Cindy Lee Sang
- Staff: 47
- Teaching staff: 16
- Grades: 9–12
- Gender: Co-educational
- Average class size: 19
- Campus size: 64 acres (260,000 m^{2})
- Colors: Black and Gold
- Slogan: "Be Not Afraid!"
- Fight song: Notre Dame Victory March
- Athletics: Yes
- Athletics conference: TAPPS (4A)
- Sports: Yes
- Mascot: Centurion
- Team name: Centurions
- Rival: Incarnate Word Academy
- School fees: $370 enrollment fee ($270 before April 1)
- Tuition: Full tuition (without assistance) listed at $8,050 (2026–2027)
- Website: stjpiiacademy.org

St. John Paul II Academy - High School (commonly shortened to St. John Paul II Academy, JPII, or JP2) is a private, Roman Catholic college-preparatory high school in Corpus Christi, Texas, United States. It operates as the high-school level of the diocesan St. John Paul II Academy and serves students in grades 9-12. The school is part of the Roman Catholic Diocese of Corpus Christi and shares leadership and facilities with the academy's middle-level campus.

== History ==
The Diocese of Corpus Christi announced plans for a diocesan Catholic high school in late 2005; the school was formally announced on December 8, 2005, and opened for instruction in August 2006 with an initial freshman class. The school was established under the leadership of Bishop Edmond Carmody with the stated goal of providing an affordable, college-prep Catholic education for families in the diocese.

Following the beatification of Pope John Paul II in 2011, the school used the name Blessed John Paul II High School and later adopted the name St. John Paul II High School after his canonization.

=== Merger and academy formation (2025) ===
On January 27, 2025 the Diocese of Corpus Christi announced an administrative alignment of the diocesan high school (St. John Paul II High School) and its neighboring diocesan middle preparatory school (Bishop Garriga Middle Preparatory School) under a single identity as St. John Paul II Academy. The reorganization placed both schools under unified leadership while preserving separate middle- and high-school levels; the high school was renamed St. John Paul II Academy - High School and the middle school became St. John Paul II Academy - Middle School (or Middle Level). The alignment and blessing of the new academy were covered by local media and diocesan communications in 2025.

== Campus ==
St. John Paul II Academy sits on a multi-acre campus on Saratoga Boulevard in Corpus Christi and shares several facilities (chapel, cafeteria, library) and select staff between campuse as part of the academy model.

== Academics ==
The school follows a college-preparatory curriculum. Graduation requirements include four years of English, mathematics, science, social studies, and Catholic theology; students must also complete required credits in technology, fine arts, physical education, and electives. The academy also offers academic support and financial-aid opportunities; tuition and fee schedules are published annually by the school and are based on household income and diocesan assistance programs.

== Student life and activities ==
=== Athletics ===
The school's athletic teams are the Centurions. The academy fields teams in a range of sports including football, basketball, baseball, softball, soccer, volleyball, golf, tennis, track & field, cross country, swimming, drill team, dance team, and cheerleading. St. John Paul II competes in the Texas Association of Private and Parochial Schools (TAPPS), and appears in TAPPS 4A alignments for the 2024–26 realignment cycle in multiple sports.

The varsity baseball program won back-to-back TAPPS 4A state championships in 2010 and 2011, and the program produced Major League Baseball player Jose Trevino, among others.

=== Clubs and organizations ===
Student organizations have included Student Council, Voices That Care (service), Health Careers Club, Centurions for Life, the Pan American Student Forum, and honor societies such as Sociedad Honoraria Hispánica (Spanish Honor Society), National English Honor Society, and National Honor Society. The academy also participates in local academic competitions; historically the school competed on KEDT's televised academic contest Challenge! and achieved tournament successes in the early 2010s.

== Notable alumni ==
- Jose Trevino - professional baseball catcher; graduated John Paul II High School (Corpus Christi) in 2011 and went on to play collegiately at Oral Roberts University before entering Major League Baseball. He was a key member of the school's back-to-back TAPPS state titles in 2010 and 2011.

== See also ==
- Roman Catholic Diocese of Corpus Christi
- Texas Association of Private and Parochial Schools
