= Corpus Christi Cathedral (Corpus Christi, Texas) =

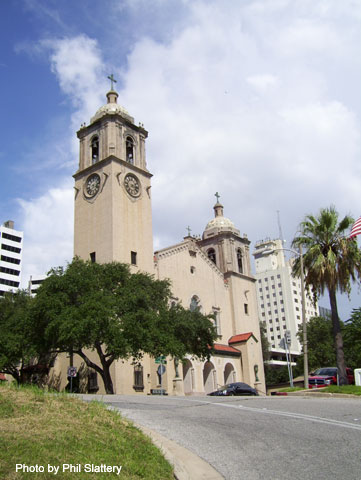

- Location within Texas
- 27°47′40″N 97°23′49″W
- Location: 505 North Upper Broadway; Corpus Christi, Texas
- Country: United States
- Denomination: Roman Catholic
- Website: www.cccathedral.com

History
- Status: Cathedral
- Founded: 1853
- Dedicated: 1940

Architecture
- Architect: Charles Monot
- Style: Spanish Colonial Revival
- Completed: 1940
- Construction cost: $425,000

Specifications
- Length: 176 feet (54 m)
- Width: 90 feet (27 m)
- Height: 133 feet (41 m)
- Materials: Stucco

Administration
- Diocese: Corpus Christi

Clergy
- Bishop: Most Rev. Mario Alberto Avilés
- Rector: Very Rev. Pete Elizardo

Corpus Christi Cathedral is a cathedral church located in Corpus Christi, Texas, United States. It is the seat of the Catholic Diocese of Corpus Christi.

== History ==
=== St. Patrick's Cathedral ===
In the early years of Corpus Christi, priests would come from as far away as Laredo and Victoria to minister to the pastoral needs of the Catholics in the area. Because there was no church building Mass was celebrated in private homes. The Rev. Bernard O'Reilly was assigned by Bishop Jean-Marie Odin of Galveston to be the first pastor in Corpus Christi. Mass was being celebrated in a small adobe church by 1855, two years before the structure itself was completed. The property on which the church was built was bounded by Leopard, Tancahua, Antelope and Caranchua Streets. It had been donated by H. L. Kinney. Because of the large number of Irish immigrants in the parish it was named St. Patrick.

On August 28, 1874, the Vicariate Apostolic of Brownsville was established by Pope Pius IX. The Rev. Dominic Manucy was named the Vicar Apostolic, however, because of conflicts in Brownsville he resided in Corpus Christi. Finding St. Patrick's Church in need of repair he had a second and larger church built on the same property. The new church was ready for use in November 1882. On March 23, 1912, St. Pius X established the Diocese of Corpus Christi and St. Patrick's became the cathedral for the new diocese. Major hurricanes hit Corpus Christi in 1916 and 1919 and St. Patrick's provided refuge for those displaced by the storms. In November 1938, St. Patrick's Cathedral was damaged in a fire.

=== Corpus Christi Cathedral ===
St. Patrick's Parish and the diocese had started to outgrow the old cathedral church before the fire. It was decided that a new church should be built. John Kenedy donated the land for the new church. Charles Monot designed the new cathedral in the Spanish Colonial Revival style. The cornerstone was laid on March 1, 1940, and it was dedicated by Bishop Emmanuel Ledvina in July of the same year. Pope Pius XII made it known that he desired the cathedral's name be changed to Corpus Christi and so the name was changed at the time of the dedication. The St. Patrick's buildings were rebuilt and became Our Lady, Star of the Sea Church.

Corpus Christi Cathedral measures 176 feet (54 m) in length and 90 feet (27 m) in width. The south tower is 125 feet (38 m) to the top of the dome and 133 feet (41 m) to the top of the cross. The north tower is the shorter of the two towers and it rises to 97 feet (30 m) to the top of the dome and 105 feet (32 m) to the top of the cross.

Bishop Thomas Drury had the cathedral renovated in the 1960s to reflect the liturgical changes from the Second Vatican Council. During the pastorate of Msgr. Richard Shirley the Cathedral Concert Series was initiated and the parish began participation in ecumenical outreach programs in the community. A chapel was created in the crypt of the cathedral for daily Mass and a new rectory was built in 1979. The cathedral was renovated again in 1980. In the 1980s a weekly televised Mass was originated from the cathedral.

== See also ==
- List of Catholic cathedrals in the United States
- List of cathedrals in the United States
