= Mariano Simon Garriga =

American prelate

His Excellency, The Most Reverend Mariano Simon Garriga
- Bishop of Corpus Christi; Titular Bishop of Syene
- Church: Roman Catholic Church
- See: Diocese of Corpus Christi
- In office: September 21, 1936 to February 21, 1965
- Predecessor: Emmanuel Boleslaus Ledvina
- Successor: Thomas Joseph Drury
- Other post: Titular Bishop of Syene

Orders
- Ordination: July 2, 1911 by John William Shaw
- Consecration: September 21, 1936 by Arthur Jerome Drossaerts

Personal details
- Born: May 30, 1886 Port Isabel, Texas, US
- Died: February 21, 1965 (aged 78) Corpus Christi, Texas, US
- Education: St. Mary College; St. Francis Seminary
- Motto: Sub tutela matris (Under the protection of his mother)

Mariano Simon Garriga (May 30, 1886 – February 21, 1965) was an American prelate of the Roman Catholic Church. He served as bishop of the Diocese of Corpus Christi in Texas from 1949 until his death in 1965.

== Biography ==
=== Early life ===
Mariano Garriga was born on May 30, 1886, in Port Isabel, Texas, to Frank and Elizabeth (née Baker) Garriga. He studied at St. Mary College in Kansas City, Kansas, and at St. Francis Seminary in Milwaukee, Wisconsin.

=== Priesthood ===
Garriga was ordained to the priesthood at the Incarnate Word Chapel in San Antonio, Texas, by Archbishop John William Shaw for the Archdiocese of San Antonio on July 2, 1911. He served as assistant chancellor of the archdiocese until 1912, when he was appointed as a curate to a parish in Marfa, Texas. In 1915, he was named vice-rector of St. John Seminary in San Antonio.

Garriga served as a chaplain to the Texas National Guard during World War I, training with the 36th Infantry Division. From 1919 to 1936, he served as pastor of St. Cecilia Parish in San Antonio. He also served as president of Incarnate Word College in San Antonio. He was a professor at St. John Seminary from 1921 to 1936, and became historian of the archdiocese in 1926. The Vatican raised Garriga to the rank of papal chamberlain in 1934, and to domestic prelate in 1935.

=== Coadjutor Bishop and Bishop of Corpus Christi ===
On June 20, 1936, Garriga was appointed coadjutor bishop of Corpus Christi and titular bishop of Syene by Pope Pius XI. Garriga received his episcopal consecration at the Cathedral of San Fernando in San Antonio on September 21, 1936, from Archbishop Arthur Drossaerts, with Bishops Emmanuel Ledvina and Aloisius Muench serving as co-consecrators. He was the first Catholic bishop of a Texas diocese to be born in Texas. In addition to his episcopal duties, he served as pastor of St. Peter Parish in Laredo, Texas (1936-1948).

Upon the resignation of Bishop Ledvina, Garriga succeed him as the third Bishop of Corpus Christi on March 15, 1949. During his 16-year-long tenure, he founded a minor seminary in 1960 and established several parochial schools.

=== Death ===
Mariano Garriga died in Corpus Christi on February 21, 1965, at age 78. He is buried in the crypt of Corpus Christi Cathedral.

== Episcopal succession ==
Catholic Church titles
Preceded by Emmanuel Boleslaus Ledvina	Bishop of Corpus Christi; 1949–1965	Succeeded by Thomas Joseph Drury
