= Thomas Joseph Drury =

Irish-born prelate

His Excellency, The Most Reverend Thomas Joseph Drury
- Bishop of Corpus Christi
- Church: Roman Catholic
- See: Diocese of Corpus Christi
- In office: 1965–1983
- Predecessor: Mariano Simon Garriga
- Successor: René Henry Gracida
- Previous posts: Bishop of San Angelo; 1962 to 1965

Orders
- Ordination: June 2, 1935 by Robert Lucey
- Consecration: January 24, 1962 by Robert Lucey

Personal details
- Born: January 4, 1908 Ballymote, Ireland
- Died: July 22. 1992 Neptune Township, New Jersey, US
- Motto: Deo servire regnare (To serve God is to reign)

Thomas Joseph Drury DD LHD (January 4, 1908 – July 22, 1992) was an Irish-born prelate of the Roman Catholic Church. He served as the first bishop of the Diocese of San Angelo in Texas from 1962 to 1965 and as the fourth bishop of the Diocese of Corpus Christi in Texas from 1965 to 1983.

== Biography ==
=== Early life ===
Thomas Drury was born on January 4, 1908, in Ballymote, Ireland. He was ordained a priest by Archbishop Robert Lucey for the Diocese of Amarillo on June 2, 1935, after immigrating to the United States.

=== Bishop of San Angelo ===
Drury was appointed bishop of San Angelo on October 30, 1961, by Pope John XXIII. He was consecrated by Archbishop Lucey on January 24, 1962 at the Cathedral of the Sacred Heart in San Angelo.

=== Bishop of Corpus Christi ===
On July 19, 1965, Drury was appointed bishop of Corpus Christi by Pope Paul VI. He served as the bishop during the Second Vatican Council in Rome during the early 1960s.

Drury expanded diocesan activities from two to 32 departments, including Catholic Charities, the Office of Catholic Schools, the Catholic Youth Organization, and the Department of Hispanic Affairs. Drury created a diocesan pastoral council to advise him on current issues in the diocese. He also established a weekly newspaper, Texas Gulf Coast Register, in 1966

=== Retirement and death ===
Pope John Paul II accepted Drury's resignation as bishop of Corpus Christi on May 19, 1983. Thomas Drury died in Neptune Township, New Jersey, on July 22, 1992, at age 84.

== Episcopal succession ==
Catholic Church titles
Preceded by Mariano Simon Garriga	Bishop of Corpus Christi; 1966–1983	Succeeded by René Henry Gracida
Preceded by None (diocese erected)	Bishop of San Angelo; 1961–1965	Succeeded by Thomas Ambrose Tschoepe
