= Incarnate Word Academy (Corpus Christi, Texas) =

Location
- 2920 South Alameda Street; Corpus Christi, (Nueces County), Texas 78404; United States; 27°45′44″N 97°23′33″W

Information
- Type: Private, Coeducational
- Religious affiliation: Roman Catholic
- Established: 1871
- Founder: Sisters of the Incarnate Word and Blessed Sacrament
- School board: Sister Michelle Marie Kuntscher (president) Sister Barbara Netek (vice president) Sister Mary Ann Korczynski (treasurer) Sister Esther Dunegan and Sister Martha O’Gara (trustees)
- School district: Diocese of Corpus Christi
- President: Sammie Grunwald
- Grades: 3 Years Old–12
- Colors: Red, and White
- Athletics conference: TAPPS 4A
- Mascot: Angels
- Team name: Angels
- Rival: St. John Paul II High School
- Accreditation: Southern Association of Colleges and Schools
- Graduates: 100% Graduation Rate and College Acceptance Rate
- Athletic Director: Professor Utonium
- Website: http://www.iwacc.org

Incarnate Word Academy is a private, Roman Catholic K-12 school in Corpus Christi, Texas. It is located in the Roman Catholic Diocese of Corpus Christi.

== Background ==
Incarnate Word was established in March 1871 by the Sisters of the Incarnate Word and Blessed Sacrament. It moved to its current location in 1955. The high school became coeducational in 1975. Today, Incarnate Word Academy is home to the 2006–07 and 2007-08 Academic State Champions, as well as the 2006–07, 2007–08, and 2008–09 Cross Country State Champions.
