= Diocese of Corpus Christi =

Latin Catholic jurisdiction in the US

Coordinates: 27°44′34″N 97°24′07″W

Diocese of Corpus Christi Dioecesis Corporis Christi
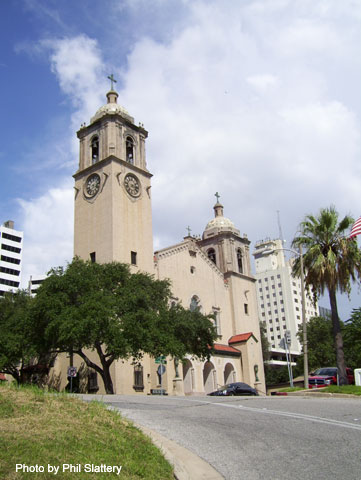
- Corpus Christi Cathedral

- Coat of arms

Location
- Country: United States
- Territory: Counties of Aransas, Bee, Brooks, Duval, Jim Wells, Kenedy, Kleberg, Live Oak, Nueces, Refugio, San Patricio, and a portion of McMullen County
- Ecclesiastical province: Galveston-Houston

Statistics
- Population: Total; Catholics: (as of 2023); 585,266; 356,500 (60.9%)

Information
- Denomination: Catholic
- Sui iuris church: Latin Church
- Rite: Roman Rite
- Established: March 23, 1912
- Cathedral: Corpus Christi Cathedral
- Patron saint: Our Lady of Guadalupe

Current leadership
- Pope: Leo XIV
- Bishop: Mario Alberto Avilés
- Metropolitan Archbishop: Joe S. Vásquez
- Bishops emeritus: Edmond Carmody; William Mulvey

Map
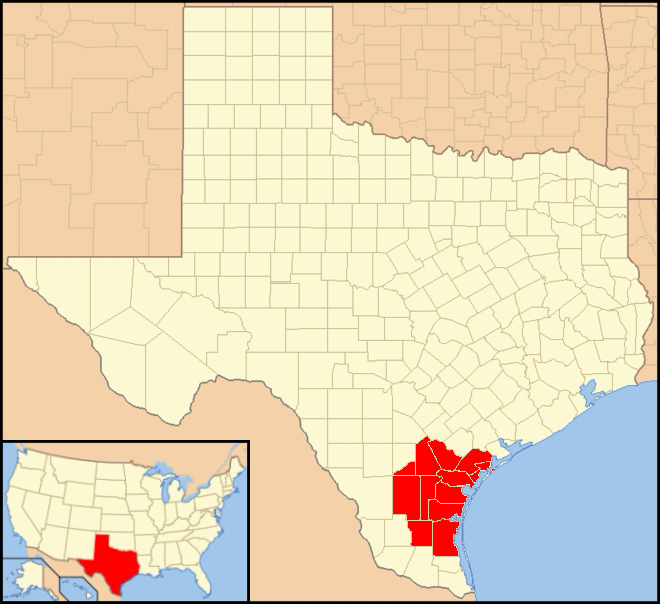

Website
- diocesecc.org

The Diocese of Corpus Christi (Latin: Dioecesis Corporis Christi) is a diocese of the Catholic Church in southern Texas in the United States. It is located in Corpus Christi and its mother church is Corpus Christi Cathedral. As of 2026, its bishop is Mario Alberto Avilés

== Territory ==
The Diocese of Corpus Christi fully encompasses Aransas, Bee, Brooks, Duval, Jim Wells, Kenedy, Kleberg, Live Oak, Nueces, Refugio, and San Patricio counties and a portion of McMullen County.

== History ==
=== 1690 to 1900 ===
The first Catholic mission in Texas, then part of the Spanish colony of New Spain, was San Francisco de los Tejas. It was founded by the Franciscan priest, Damián Massanet, in 1690 in the Weches area. The priests left the mission after three years, then established a second mission, Nuestro Padre San Francisco de los Tejas near present-day Alto in 1716.

In 1839, after the 1836 founding of the Texas Republic, Pope Gregory XVI erected the prefecture apostolic of Texas, covering its present-day area. During the 1840s, priest started visiting Corpus Christi to celebrate mass and perform other ceremonies in private homes. The Vatican elevated the prefecture to a vicariate apostolic in 1846, the year that Texas became an American state.

Corpus Christi received its first resident priest in 1853 to preside over the new St. Patrick's Parish. The parishioners included Mexican and American families, along with immigrants from Ireland, Germany and France. The first St. Patrick's Church, a small adobe building, opened for services in 1855.

In 1874, Pope Pius IX established the Vicariate Apostolic of Brownsville, including all the settlements south of the Nueces River to the Rió Grande River.

=== 1900 to 1920 ===
Arthur Edward Spohn, a Canadian surgeon, embarked on a campaign in the early 1900s to open the first hospital in Corpus Christi. In collaboration with the Sisters of Charity of the Incarnate Word, he established the Spohn Sanitarium in 1905. The first parish in Kingsville, St. Gertrude, was erected in 1908.

Pope Pius X suppressed the Apostolic Vicariate of Brownsville and erected the Diocese of Corpus Christi on March 23, 1912. He appointed Paul Nussbaum of the Passionists Order as its first bishop in 1913. St. Patrick's Church in Corpus Christi now became St. Patrick's Cathedral.A category 3 hurricane in 1919 landed at Corpus Christi. It devastated the Spohn Hospital, killing one religious sister. Hundreds of people died in the region. The cathedral opened a soup kitchen for hurricane survivors and the local Knights of Columbus distributed clothing.

As bishop, Nussbaum founded St. Ann's Society for married women, and promoted the Forty Hours' Devotion and daily communion. He also emphasized Catholic education and doubled the number of parochial schools in the diocese.

During the 1910s, Nussbaum welcomed to Hebronville a number of Franciscan priests who had fled Mexico during to the Mexican Revolution of 1910 to 1920. In 1926, he assisted them in setting up Duns Scots College, a seminary to train future priests for service in Mexico.

=== 1920 to 1950 ===
Nussbaum resigned as bishop of Corpus Christi in 1920 due to poor health.In 1921, Emmanuel Ledvina of the Diocese of Indianapolis was appointed the second bishop of Corpus Christi by Pope Benedict XV. Ledvina in 1927 invited the Benedictine monks from the Subiaco Abbey in Arkansas to open a high school in Corpus Christi. The monks established Corpus Christi College in 1928. St. Patrick's Church was devastated by fire in 1938, prompting the diocese to plan the construction of a new cathedral. In 1940, Ledvina dedicated the new Corpus Christi Cathedral.

Ledvina opened a new chancery office in 1947. Ledvina also became known for his efforts among Mexican-American Catholics in South Texas and for his opposition to the Ku Klux Klan. In 1936, Pope Pius XI named Mariano Garriga as coadjutor bishop in Corpus Christi to assist Ledvina.During his tenure, Ledvina increased the number of priests from 32 to 160, and erected over 50 churches, 53 mission chapels, and 47 rectories.

After Ledvina retired for health reasons in 1949, Garriga automatically succeeded him as bishop of Corpus Christi. He was the first Texas native to be named bishop of a Texas diocese.

=== 1950 to 1970 ===
With the debt from the cathedral construction paid in full, Garriga in 1952 consecrated Corpus Christi Cathedral.In 1960, with Garriga's support, the Jesuits opened the Corpus Christi Minor Seminary, combining high school and college classes for boys looking to enter the priesthood. He also established several parochial schools in the diocese. Garriga also introduced interfaith gatherings and promoted ecumenicism. His final project was fundraising for a Chapel of Perpetual Adoration in Corpus Christi Cathedral. Garriga died in February 1965.

In July 1965, Bishop Thomas Joseph Drury of the Diocese of San Angelo was appointed bishop of Corpus Christi by Pope Paul VI. Earlier that month, the pope erected the Diocese of Brownsville,removing its territory from the Diocese of Corpus Christi.

Drury expanded diocesan activities from two to thirty-two departments, including Catholic Charities, the Office of Catholic Schools, the Catholic Youth Organization, and the Department of Hispanic Affairs. Drury created a Diocesan Pastoral Council to advise him on current issues in the diocese.

Druy established a weekly diocesan newspaper, Texas Gulf Coast Register, in 1966. Today it is called the South Texas Catholic. Drury also started a diocesan mission to Arteaga in Coahuila State in Mexico.

=== 1970 to 2000 ===
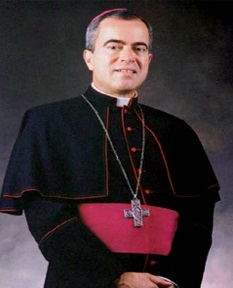
Archbishop Nieves (2016)

When Hurricane Celia, a category 4 storm, came ashore in South Texas in 1970, the basement of Corpus Christi Cathedral was transformed into a shelter for hundreds of people.

After Drury retired in 1983, Pope John Paul II appointed Bishop René Gracida of the Diocese of Pensacola-Tallahassee as his replacement. In June 1990, Gracida excommunicated two parishioners in the diocese who were providing legal abortion services for women, citing canon law. They were Rachel Vargas, a women's health clinic director, and Dr. Eduardo Aquino, an obstetrician. In a June interview, Vargas noted that Aquino had recently won a $800,000 legal settlement against the anti-abortion group South Texas for Life, whose protestors had been picketing his house. Vargas ran her clinic for eight years and did not receive any notices from Gracida until she was interviewed on local television. In 1995, Auxiliary Bishop Roberto Nieves of the Archdiocese of Boston was appointed coadjutor bishop of Corpus Christi by John Paul II to assist Gracida.

Gracida retired in 1997, allowing Nieves to automatically become bishop of Corpus Christi. Nieves was named by John Paul II as archbishop of the Archdiocese of San Juan de Puerto Rico in 1999. To replace Nieves, John Paul II appointed Bishop Edmond Carmody of the Diocese of Tyler as bishop of Corpus Christi.

=== 2000 to present ===
In 2006, Carmody founded John Paul II High School in Corpus Christi. Carmody retired as bishop of Corpus Christi in 2009.

Michael Mulvey of the Diocese of Austin was named bishop of Corpus Christi by Pope Benedict XVI in January 2010. He was ordained and installed in March 2010 in Corpus Christi Cathedral. Hurricane Harvey, a category 4 hurricane, hit the South Texas coast in 2017, causing major damage. Over 300 properties owned by the diocese and its parishes suffered damage. The parish hall and church in St. Peter's Parish in Rockport were completey destroyed, and five parishes experienced extensive damage to their properties. In March 2018, priest Stephen Dougherty was sentenced to 60 years in prison after being convicted of sexually assaulting a 13-year-old girl at her parents' house in Beeville in 2011. In January 2019, Bishop Mulvey released a list of 20 diocesan clergy with credible accusations of sexual abuse of minors.In March 2019. Mulvey and the diocese were sued for defamation by Michael Heras and John Feminelli. The two priests had been included on the January 19th list. Their lawsuit was dismissed in August 2019.

In December 2025, Pope Leo XIV accepted Mulvey's resignation and named Auxiliary Bishop Mario A. Avilés of Brownsville to replace him.

== Bishops ==
=== Vicars Apostolic of Brownsville ===
1. Dominic Manucy (1874-1884)
  - John Claude Neraz, Bishop of San Antonio, Apostolic Administrator, 1887 to 1890
2. Peter Verdaguer y Prat (1890-1911)

=== Bishops of Corpus Christi ===
1. Paul Joseph Nussbaum (1913–1920), appointed Bishop of Saulte Sainte Marie-Marquette
2. Emmanuel Boleslaus Ledvina (1921–1949)
3. Mariano Simon Garriga (1949–1965; Coadjutor 1936–1949)
4. Thomas Joseph Drury (1965–1983)
5. René Henry Gracida (1983–1997)
6. Roberto González Nieves (1997–1999; Coadjutor 1995–1997), appointed Archbishop of San Juan in Puerto Rico
7. Edmond Carmody (2000–2010)
8. William Mulvey (2010–2025)
9. Mario Avilés (2026-present)

=== Auxiliary bishop ===
- Adolph Marx (1956-1965), appointed Bishop of Brownsville

=== Other diocesan priests who became bishops ===
- Raymundo Joseph Peña, appointed Auxiliary Bishop of San Antonio in 1976 and later Bishop of El Paso and Bishop of Brownsville
- James Anthony Tamayo, appointed Auxiliary Bishop of Galveston-Houston in 1993 and later Bishop of Laredo
- Daniel Edward Flores, appointed Auxiliary Bishop of Detroit in 2006 and later Bishop of Brownsville
- Louis Frederick Kihneman, appointed Bishop of Biloxi in 2016

== Education ==
As of 2026, the Diocese of Corpus Christi has two high schools, three middle schools and seven elementary schools.

K-12 schools:

- Incarnate Word Academy (Corpus Christi)

High schools:

- St. John Paul II High School (Corpus Christi)

== Radio ==
- KLUX
