= René Henry Gracida =

American Roman Catholic bishop (1923–2026)

His Excellency, The Most Reverend René Henry Gracida
- Bishop Emeritus of Corpus Christi
- Church: Catholic Church
- Archdiocese: Galveston–Houston
- Diocese: Corpus Christi
- Appointed: May 19, 1983
- Installed: June 11, 1983
- Retired: April 1, 1997
- Predecessor: Thomas Joseph Drury
- Successor: Roberto González Nieves
- Previous posts: Bishop of Pensacola-Tallahassee (1975–1983); Auxiliary Bishop of Miami and Titular Bishop of Masuccaba (1971–1975)

Orders
- Ordination: May 23, 1959 by Bishop Hugh L. Lamb
- Consecration: January 25, 1972 by Cardinal John Francis Dearden

Personal details
- Born: June 9, 1923 New Orleans, Louisiana, U.S.
- Died: May 1, 2026 (aged 102)
- Education: University of Houston; St. Vincent Seminary
- Motto: Abyssus abyssum invocat (Deep calls to deep)

Styles of René Henry Gracida
- Reference style: His Excellency; The Most Reverend
- Spoken style: Your Excellency
- Religious style: Bishop

Ordination history of René Henry Gracida
History
Diaconal ordination
- Ordained by: Hugh L. Lamb
Priestly ordination
- Ordained by: Hugh L. Lamb
Episcopal consecration
- Principal consecrator: John Dearden
- Co-consecrators: Coleman Carroll, Paul Tanner

René Henry Gracida (June 9, 1923 – May 1, 2026) was an American Catholic prelate who served as bishop of Corpus Christi in Texas from 1983 to 1997. He previously served as Bishop of Pensacola-Tallahassee in Florida (1975–1983) and as an auxiliary bishop of the Archdiocese of Miami in Florida (1971–1975).

== Biography ==
=== Early life ===
Born in New Orleans, Louisiana, on June 9, 1923, Gracida was the second child of Enrique J. Gracida Carrizosa, a Mexican architect and engineer, and Mathilde Derbes, a fifth-generation French-American. His great uncle was a vicar general of a diocese in Mexico. As a teenager, René Gracida was fascinated with the Jesuit martyrs portrayed in the 1826 novel The Last of the Mohicans by James Fenimore Cooper.

During World War II, Gracida flew 32 missions in the US Army Air Corps, first as a tail-gunner, then as a flight engineer, in the 303rd Air Expeditionary Group. After the war, he entered the University of Houston, where he earned a Bachelor of Architecture degree. Gracida then worked as an architect for several years.

In 1951, Gracida entered the Order of St. Benedict and went into Saint Vincent Archabbey in Latrobe, Pennsylvania. This move upset his father, who disliked Catholic clergy. Required to choose a religious name, Gracida selected René Goupil, a French Jesuit lay missionary. Gracida took his simple vows in 1953 and his solemn vows in 1956. He was ordained a deacon in 1958. During this period, Gracida attended St. Vincent College and Saint Vincent Seminary in Latrobe. At Saint Vincent Seminary, he earned a Masters of Divinity degree.

=== Priesthood ===
Gracida was ordained into the priesthood at the Cathedral of the Blessed Sacrament in Greensburg, Pennsylvania, for the Order of St. Benedict on May 23, 1959, by Bishop Hugh L. Lamb. In 1961, after a dispute over plans for a new residence for the Order, the archabbot told Gracida that he was no longer welcome in the order. That same year, Gracida was incardinated, or transferred, from the Benedictine Order to the Archdiocese of Miami.

=== Auxiliary Bishop of Miami ===
On December 6, 1971, Gracida was appointed by Pope Paul VI as auxiliary bishop of Miami and titular bishop of Masuccaba. Gracida was consecrated on January 25, 1972, by Cardinal John Dearden, with Archbishop Coleman Carroll and Bishop Paul Tanner serving as co-consecrators. During this period, Gracida got a pilot's license and rented small planes to serve parishes in the archdiocese.

=== Bishop of Pensacola-Tallahassee ===
Pope Paul VI appointed Gracida as the first bishop of Pensacola-Tallahassee on October 1, 1975; he was installed on November 6, 1975. In 1978, he was granted a Doctor of Laws (honoris causa) from St. Leo College in St. Leo, Florida.

=== Bishop of Corpus Christi ===
On May 19, 1983, Pope John Paul II appointed Gracida as the bishop of Corpus Christi. He was installed on July 11, 1983. In 1985, he was named the Grand Prior of the newly-created Southwestern USA Lieutenancy of the Equestrian Order of the Holy Sepulchre of Jerusalem.

Gracida and the diocese were sued in 1988 by a couple who claimed that Reverend John J. Feminelli, a diocese priest, had engaged in private "wrestling matches" with their teenage son. The couple claimed that diocese officials slandered the boy, prompting him to recant his testimony in a court case. In 2019, Feminelli was listed with other priests in the diocese with credible allegations of sexual abuse of minors.

In June 1990, Gracida excommunicated two parishioners who were providing legal abortion services for women, citing canon law. They were Rachel Vargas, a women's health clinic director, and Dr. Eduardo Aquino, an obstetrician. In an interview, Aquino noted that he had recently won a $800,000 legal settlement against the anti-abortion group South Texas for Life, whose protestors had been picketing his house. Vargas said ran her clinic for eight years without receiving any notices from Gracida until she was interviewed on local television.

=== Retirement, later life and death ===
John Paul II accepted Gracida's resignation as bishop of Corpus Christi on April 1, 1997. In 2017, Gracida posted on his blog and publicly signed a "Filial Correction" of Pope Francis, being the first bishop to sign the document. In 2020, Gracida visited a restaurant in Sinton with actor Mel Gibson, a sedevacantist traditionalist Catholic.

Following Gracida's tenure as bishop of the Diocese of Corpus Christi, that diocese in 2019 released a list of priests credibly accused of sexual abuse, much of which occurred while Gracida was bishop there. Gracida turned 100 on June 9, 2023, and died on the morning of May 1, 2026, at the age of 102. At the time, he was the oldest living bishop in the United States of America, and the second-oldest living bishop in the world.

== Viewpoints ==
=== Entertainment ===
In January 1989, Gracida called for a boycott of all Pepsi-Cola products because of one of their commercial series. The commercials used the "Like a Prayer" music video by the singer Madonna that Gracida and other religious leaders considered sacrilegious. Pepsi eventually withdrew the ads and canceled its contract with Madonna.

=== Immigration ===
On June 13, 2018, the US Conference of Catholic Bishops approved a resolution condemning the immigration policies of the Trump Administration. Bishop Edward Weisenburger of the Diocese of Tucson suggested canonical penalties, which could include excommunication, for federal officials who separated children from families of undocumented immigrants. In a 2018 interview, Gracida rejected the idea of excommunicating these officials, saying, “It's scandalous for the bishop to say that! They did not write the law but are enforcing it [...] it's absurd and it's idiotic.”

== Works ==
- 2016 – An Ordinary's Not So Ordinary Life

== See also ==
- Catholic Church hierarchy
- Catholic Church in the United States
- Historical list of the Catholic bishops of the United States
- List of Catholic bishops of the United States
- Lists of patriarchs, archbishops, and bishops

Catholic Church titles
Preceded by –	Bishop Emeritus of Corpus Christi; 1997–2026	Succeeded by –
Preceded by Thomas Joseph Drury	Bishop of Corpus Christi; 1983–1997	Succeeded by Roberto González Nieves
Preceded by First Bishop	Bishop of Pensacola–Tallahassee; 1975–1983	Succeeded by Joseph Keith Symons
Preceded by –	Auxiliary Bishop of Miami; 1971–1975	Succeeded by –
Preceded by Urban John Vehr	Titular Bishop of Masuccaba; 1971–1975	Succeeded by Giovanni Bernardo Gremoli
