= List of Catholic bishops of Texas =

The following is a list of bishops of the Catholic Church in Texas. The Texas Catholic Church comprises 15 Latin Church dioceses and one personal ordinariate led by a bishop.

The 15 Latin dioceses are divided into two ecclesiastical provinces. Each province has a metropolitan archdiocese led by an archbishop, and six, Galveston-Houston, or seven, San Antonio, suffragan dioceses. In most archdioceses and some large dioceses, one or more auxiliary bishops may serve in association with the diocesan bishop. From 2007 with his creation as cardinal until his retirement in 2025, the metropolitan archbishop of Galveston–Houston was a cardinal: (Daniel Cardinal DiNardo).

All active and retired bishops in Texas — diocesan, coadjutor, and auxiliary — are members of the United States Conference of Catholic Bishops (USCCB).

== Bishops of Latin Church dioceses ==
Province	Ecclesiastical Province Map	Diocese	Diocese Coat of Arms	Bishop	Title	Bishop Coat of Arms	Diocese from
Galveston-Houston		Archdiocese of Galveston–Houston		Joe Steve Vásquez	Archbishop of Galveston-Houston (2025–present), former bishop of Diocese of Austin (2010–2025), Former auxiliary bishop of Galveston-Houston (2001–2010)		Diocese of Lubbock, ordained for the Diocese of San Angelo
Galveston-Houston		Archdiocese of Galveston–Houston		Cardinal Daniel Nicholas DiNardo	Archbishop Emeritus of Galveston–Houston (2006–2025), Coadjutor Bishop/Archbishop (2004–06), former bishop of Sioux City (1998–2004, Coadjutor 1997–98)		Diocese of Pittsburgh
Galveston-Houston		Archdiocese of Galveston–Houston		Italo Dell'Oro, C.R.S.	Auxiliary Bishop of Galveston–Houston (2021–present)		Archdiocese of Milan, ordained for the Order of Clerics Regular of Somasca
Galveston-Houston		Diocese of Austin		Daniel E. Garcia	Bishop of Austin (2025–present), Bishop of Monterey (2019–2025), Auxiliary Bishop of Austin (2015–2019)		Diocese of Austin
Galveston-Houston		Diocese of Beaumont		David Toups	Bishop of Beaumont (2020–present), former rector of St. Vincent de Paul Regional Seminary (2012–2020)		Diocese of Saint Petersburg
Galveston-Houston		Diocese of Beaumont		Curtis John Guillory _{SVD}	Bishop Emeritus of Beaumont (2020–present), Bishop of Beaumont (2000–2020), former auxiliary bishop of Galveston-Houston (1988–2000)		Diocese of Lafayette in Louisiana, ordained for the Society of the Divine Word
Galveston-Houston		Diocese of Brownsville		Daniel Ernesto Flores	Bishop of Brownsville (2010–present), former auxiliary bishop of Detroit (2006–2010)		Diocese of Corpus Christi
Galveston-Houston		Diocese of Corpus Christi		Mario Alberto Avilés	Bishop of Corpus Christi (2025–present), former auxiliary bishop of Brownsville (2018–2025)		Archdiocese of Mexico City, ordained for the Oratory of Saint Philip Neri
Galveston-Houston		Diocese of Corpus Christi		William Michael Mulvey _{STL, DD}	Bishop Emeritus (2010–2025)		Diocese of Austin
Galveston-Houston		Diocese of Corpus Christi		Edmond Carmody _{DD}	Bishop Emeritus (2000–2010), former bishop of Tyler (1992–2000), former auxiliary bishop of San Antonio (1988–1992)		Archdiocese of San Antonio
Galveston-Houston		Diocese of Corpus Christi		René Henry Gracida	Bishop Emeritus (1983–1997), former bishop of Pensacola-Tallahassee, Florida (1975–1983), former auxiliary bishop of Miami, Florida (1972–1975)		Archdiocese of New Orleans, ordained for the Order of Saint Benedict, incardinated into Archdiocese of Miami
Galveston-Houston		Diocese of Tyler		John Gregory Kelly	Bishop of Tyler (2025–present), Auxiliary Bishop of Dallas (2016–2025)		Diocese of Dallas
Galveston-Houston		Diocese of Victoria		Brendan John Cahill	Bishop of Victoria (2015–present)		Archdiocese of Galveston-Houston
Galveston-Houston		Diocese of Victoria		David Eugene Fellhauer	Bishop Emeritus (1990–2015)		Diocese of Dallas
San Antonio		Archdiocese of San Antonio		Gustavo Garcia-Siller _{MSpS}	Archbishop of San Antonio (2010–present), former auxiliary bishop of Chicago (2003–2010)		Archdiocese of San Luis Potosí, ordained for the Missionaries of the Holy Spirit
San Antonio		Archdiocese of San Antonio		Michael Boulette	Auxiliary bishop of San Antonio (2017–2025)		Archdiocese of San Antonio
San Antonio		Archdiocese of San Antonio		Gary Janak	Auxiliary bishop of San Antonio (2021–present)		Diocese of Victoria
San Antonio		Archdiocese of San Antonio		Arturo Cepeda	Auxiliary bishop of San Antonio (2025–present), former Auxiliary bishop of Detroit (2011–2025)		Archdiocese of San Luis Potosí, ordained for Archdiocese of San Antonio
San Antonio		Diocese of Amarillo		Patrick James Zurek	Bishop Emeritus (2008–2026), former auxiliary bishop of San Antonio (1998–2008)		Diocese of Austin
San Antonio		Diocese of Dallas		Edward J. Burns	Bishop of Dallas (2017–present)		Diocese of Pittsburgh
San Antonio		Diocese of El Paso		Mark Joseph Seitz	Bishop of El Paso (2013–present), former auxiliary bishop of Dallas (2010–2013)		Diocese of Dallas
San Antonio		Diocese of El Paso		Anthony Celino	Auxiliary bishop of El Paso (2023–present)		Diocese of El Paso
San Antonio		Diocese of Fort Worth		Michael Fors Olson	Bishop of Fort Worth (2014–present)		Diocese of Fort Worth
San Antonio		Diocese of Laredo		James Anthony Tamayo	Bishop of Laredo (2000–present), former auxiliary bishop of Galveston-Houston (1993–2000)		Diocese of Corpus Christi
San Antonio		Diocese of Lubbock		Robert Milner Coerver	Bishop of Lubbock (2016–present)		Diocese of Dallas
San Antonio		Diocese of Lubbock		Plácido Rodriguez _{CMF}	Bishop Emeritus of Lubbock, (2016–present), Bishop of Lubbock (1994–2016), former auxiliary bishop of Chicago (1983–1994)		Diocese of Celaya, ordained for the Missionary Sons of the Immaculate Heart of Mary
San Antonio		Diocese of San Angelo		Michael James Sis	Bishop of San Angelo (2014–present)		Diocese of Austin
San Antonio		Diocese of San Angelo		Michael David Pfeifer _{OMI}	Bishop Emeritus (1985–2013)		Diocese of Brownsville, ordained for the Oblates of Mary Immaculate

== Personal Ordinariate of the Chair of Saint Peter ==
The Personal Ordinariate of the Chair of Saint Peter is "a structure, similar to a diocese, that was created by the Vatican in 2012 for former Anglican communities and clergy seeking to become Catholic. Once Catholic, the communities retain many aspects of their Anglican heritage, liturgy and traditions". The ordinariate uses a missal called Divine Worship: The Missal, a variation of the Roman Rite which incorporates aspects of the Anglican liturgical tradition.

Based in Houston, Texas, with the Cathedral of Our Lady of Walsingham as it principal church, the ordinariate includes 42 parishes throughout the United States and Canada.

Originally, its territory was the same as that of the United States Conference of Catholic Bishops (USCCB). However, it was announced on December 7, 2012, that the Holy See, after consulting the Canadian Conference of Catholic Bishops (CCCB), had extended its territory to include Canada also. Accordingly, the head of the ordinariate is a full member of both episcopal conferences.

Ordinariate	Coat of Arms	Ordinary	Title	Bishop Coat of Arms
Personal Ordinariate of the Chair of Saint Peter		Steven J. Lopes	Bishop of the Personal Ordinariate of the Chair of St. Peter	
Personal Ordinariate of the Chair of Saint Peter		Msgr. Jeffrey N. Steenson, P.A.	Ordinary Emeritus of the Personal Ordinariate of the Chair of St. Peter	

== Bishops from Texas serving outside of Texas ==
The following is a list of those bishops who are from Texas, yet are serving outside of Texas.

Diocese from	Bishop	Title	Bishop Coat of Arms	Diocese	Diocese Coat of Arms
Archdiocese of Galveston-Houston	Oscar Cantú	Bishop of San José in California, former Bishop of Las Cruces, former Auxiliary Bishop of San Antonio		Diocese of San José in California	
Archdiocese of Galveston-Houston	Ricardo Ramirez, CSB	Bishop Emeritus of Las Cruces, former Auxiliary Bishop of San Antonio, ordained a priest for Basilian order		Diocese of Las Cruces	
Diocese of Austin	David Austin Konderla	Bishop of Tulsa		Diocese of Tulsa	
Diocese of Tyler	Eduardo Alanis Nevares	Auxiliary Bishop of Phoenix		Diocese of Phoenix	
Archdiocese of San Antonio	Gerald Richard Barnes	Bishop of San Bernardino		Diocese of San Bernardino	
Diocese of Dallas	John Douglas Deshotel	Bishop of Lafayette in Louisiana, former Auxiliary Bishop of Dallas		Diocese of Lafayette in Louisiana	
Diocese of Dallas	Michael Gerard Duca	Bishop of Shreveport		Diocese of Shreveport	
Diocese of Fort Worth	Stephen Jay Berg	Bishop of Pueblo		Diocese of Pueblo	
Diocese of Fort Worth	Anthony Basil Taylor	Bishop of Little Rock, ordained a priest for Archdiocese of Oklahoma City		Diocese of Little Rock	

== Former Texas Bishops serving outside of Texas ==
The following is a list living bishops who are not from Texas, but at one time served as bishops in Texas.

Bishop	Former Diocese	Bishop Coat of Arms	Title	Diocese Coat of Arms
Gregory Michael Aymond	Former bishop of Austin		Archbishop of New Orleans, Louisiana	
Alvaro Corrada del Rio	Former bishop of Tyler		Bishop of Mayagüez, Puerto Rico	
Kevin Joseph Farrell	Former bishop of Dallas		Prefect of the Dicastery for Laity, Family and Life	
José Horacio Gómez	Former archbishop of San Antonio		Archbishop of Los Angeles, California	
Roberto González Nieves, O.F.M.	Former bishop of Corpus Christi		Archbishop of San Juan, Puerto Rico	
Armando Xavier Ochoa	Former bishop of El Paso		Bishop of Fresno, California	
Kevin William Vann	Former bishop of Fort Worth		Bishop of Orange, California	
