= Thomas Flanagan (bishop) =

Catholic bishop (1930–2019)

His Excellency, The Most Reverend Thomas Joseph Flanagan
- Auxiliary Bishop Emeritus of San Antonio; Titular Bishop of Bavagaliana
- Archdiocese: San Antonio
- Appointed: January 5, 1998
- Installed: February 16, 1998
- Term ended: December 5, 2005
- Other post: Titular Bishop of Bavagaliana

Orders
- Ordination: June 10, 1956 by Jeremiah Kinane
- Consecration: February 16, 1998 by Patrick Flores, Edmond Carmody, and John E. McCarthy

Personal details
- Born: October 23, 1930 Rathmore, Ireland
- Died: October 9, 2019 (aged 88) San Antonio, Texas, U.S.
- Education: St. Patrick's College, Thurles; Oblate School of Theology
- Motto: For Christ we are ambassadors

Styles of Thomas Joseph Flanagan
- Reference style: His Excellency; The Most Reverend
- Spoken style: Your Excellency
- Religious style: Bishop

Thomas Joseph Flanagan (October 23, 1930 – October 9, 2019) was an Irish-born prelate of the Roman Catholic Church in the United States. He served as an auxiliary bishop of the Archdiocese of San Antonio in Texas from 1998 to 2005.

== Biography ==
=== Early life and education ===
Thomas Flanagan was born on October 23, 1930, in Carbury, County Kildare, Ireland. He was the oldest of eight children born to Patrick and Mary McNamara Flanagan. Flanagan attended St Conleth's National School in Carbury and then Mungret College, a high school near Limerick. He then studied at St. Patrick's College in Thurles in Ireland. In 1956, on a visit to Ireland, Archbishop Robert E. Lucey recruited Flanagan to serve as a priest in Texas after his ordination.

=== Priesthood ===
Flanagan was ordained into the priesthood by Archbishop Jeremiah Kinane at the Cathedral of the Assumption in Thurles on June 10, 1956, for the Diocese of San Antonio.

After emigrating to the United States, Flanagan served in eight parishes in Texas. He also served as spiritual advisor of the Saint Vincent de Paul Society, chair of the board of Assumption Seminary in San Antonio and diocesan chapter chaplain for its Knights of Columbus.

In 1969, Flanagan was appointed as administrator, then pastor, of St. Agnes Parish in Edna, Texas. Flanagan was awarded a Master of Divinity degree from the Oblate School of Theology in San Antonio in 1979. He was named a monsignor by Pope John Paul II on November 29, 1989.

=== Auxiliary Bishop of San Antonio ===
On January 5, 1998, Flanagan was appointed titular bishop for Bavagaliana and auxiliary bishop of San Antonio by John Paul II. Flanagan was consecrated on February 16, 1998 at the San Antonio Municipal Auditorium in San Antonio. His principal consecrator was Archbishop Patrick Flores. with Bishops Edmond Carmody and John E. McCarthy serving as co-consecrators.

=== Retirement ===
Flanagan retired as auxiliary bishop of San Antonio on December 15, 2005, at age 75. He died in San Antonio on October 9, 2019.

== See also ==
- Catholic Church hierarchy
- Catholic Church in the United States
- Historical list of the Catholic bishops of the United States
- List of Catholic bishops of the United States
- Lists of patriarchs, archbishops, and bishops

== Episcopal succession ==
Catholic Church titles
Preceded by Joseph Anthony Galante	Auxiliary Bishop of San Antonio; 1998–2005	Succeeded by Oscar Cantú
