= Rolheiser =

Rolheiser (or Rollheiser) is a surname. Notable people with the surname include:

- Leonardo Rolheiser (born 1993), Argentine footballer
- Ronald Rolheiser (born 1947), American Roman Catholic priest and academic administrator
- Benjamín Rollheiser (born 2000), Argentine footballer
