= Gary W. Janak =

American Catholic prelate (born 1962)

His Excellency, The Most Reverend Gary W. Janak
- Auxiliary Bishop of San Antonio
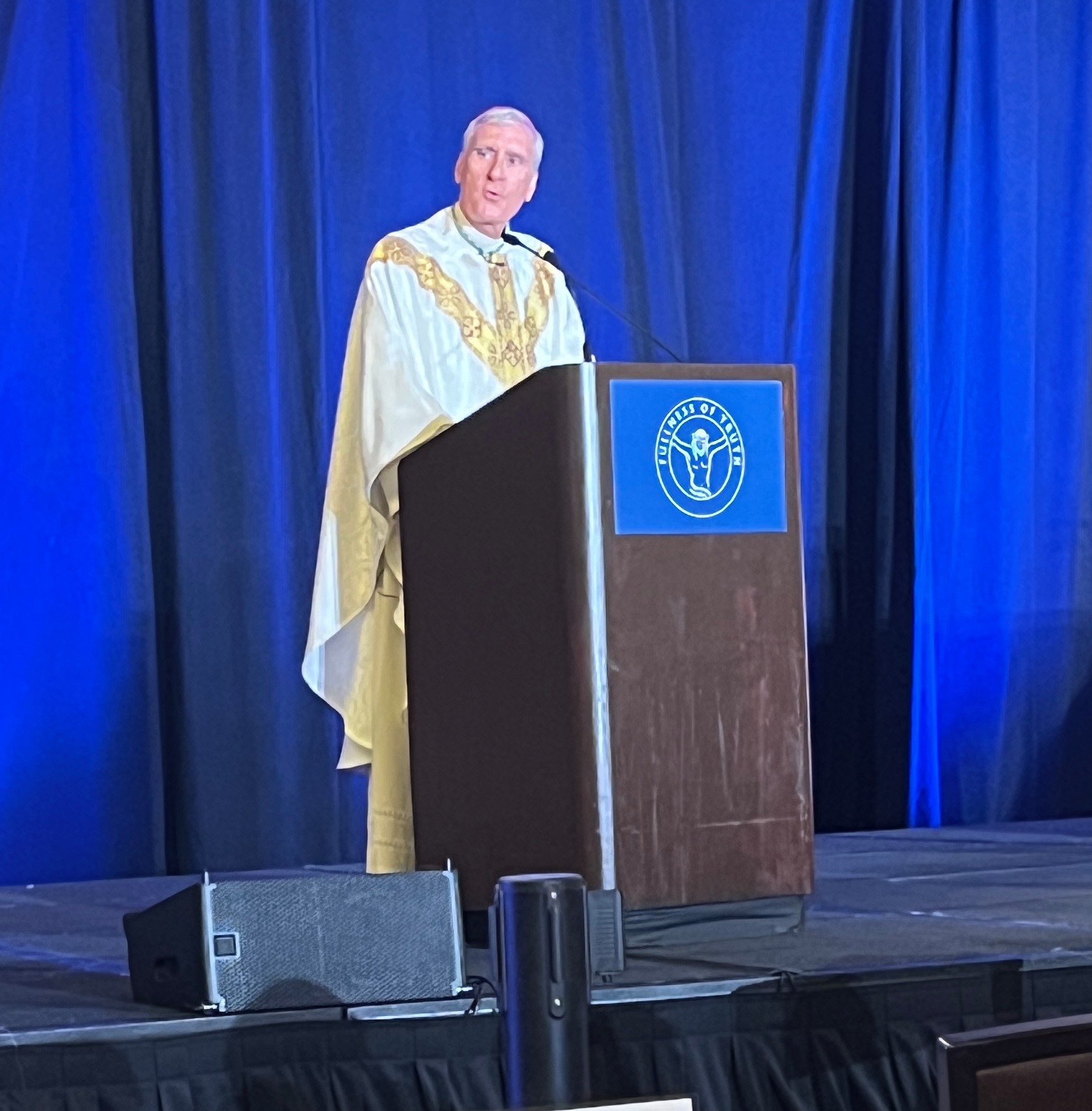
- Janak in 2025, giving a homily at the Fullness of Truth conference
- Archdiocese: San Antonio
- Appointed: February 15, 2021
- Installed: April 20, 2021
- Other post: Titular Bishop of Dionysiana

Orders
- Ordination: May 14, 1988 by Charles Victor Grahmann
- Consecration: April 20, 2021 by Gustavo García-Siller, Michael Joseph Boulette, and Brendan J. Cahill

Personal details
- Born: March 22, 1962 (age 64) El Campo, Texas, US
- Education: Wharton County Junior College; University of Texas at Austin; Immaculate Heart of Mary Seminary; Assumption Seminary; Oblate School of Theology; The Catholic University of America; University of Houston-Victoria
- Motto: Give your servant a listening heart
- Styles
- Reference style: His Excellency; The Most Reverend
- Spoken style: Your Excellency
- Religious style: Bishop

Gary Wayne Janak (born March 22, 1962) is an American Catholic prelate serving as an auxiliary bishop for the Archdiocese of San Antonio in Texas since 2021.

== Biography ==
=== Early life ===
Gary Wayne Janak was born on March 22, 1962, in El Campo, Texas to Josephat “Joe” and Rose Marie Janak. He spent the first six years of his childhood in Eagle Lake, Texas, before the family moved to Palacios, Texas. He graduated in 1980 from Palacios High School. After finishing high school, Janak spent one year at Wharton County Junior College in Wharton, Texas. He then transferred in 1982 to the University of Texas at Austin in Austin, Texas, for his sophomore year.

In 1982, Janak decided to leave the University of Texas to study for the priesthood. He entered Immaculate Heart of Mary Seminary in Santa Fe, New Mexico in 1982, graduating in 1983 with a Bachelor of Arts degree in history. He continued his studies at Assumption Seminary in San Antonio, Texas, in 1984. He received a Master of Divinity degree in 1988 from the Oblate School of Theology in San Antonio.

=== Priesthood ===
On May 14, 1988, Janak was ordained a priest at St. Anthony of Padua Church in Palacios by Bishop Charles Grahmann for the Diocese of Victoria. After his ordination, the diocese assigned Janak as parochial vicar of the Cathedral of Our Lady of Victory Parish. He was transferred in 1990 to Our Lady of Lourdes Parish in Victor to serve as a priest-in-residence. He was named pastor of St. Joseph Church in Yoakum, Texas, in 1994. During his time at St. Joseph Janak also received a Licentiate in Canon Law from the Catholic University of America in Washington, D.C., in 1995 and a Master of Arts degree in counseling from the University of Houston-Victoria in Victoria.

Janak in 2003 was named pastor of St Philip the Apostle Church in El Campo, Texas, and rector of the Cathedral of Our Lady of Victoria. After the retirement of Bishop David Fellhauer in February 2015, the clergy in the diocese elected Janak to serve a brief term as apostolic administrator of the diocese.

=== Auxiliary Bishop of San Antonio ===
Pope Francis appointed Janak as an auxiliary bishop of San Antonio and titular bishop of Dionysiana on February 15, 2021. On April 20, 2021, Janak was consecrated by Archbishop Gustavo Garcia Siller at St. Mark the Evangelist Church in San Antonio.

== See also ==
- Catholic Church hierarchy
- Catholic Church in the United States
- Historical list of the Catholic bishops of the United States
- List of Catholic bishops of the United States
- Lists of patriarchs, archbishops, and bishops

== Episcopal succession ==
Catholic Church titles
Preceded by -	Auxiliary Bishop of San Antonio; 2021-Present	Succeeded by -
