= Arturo Cepeda =

Catholic bishop

His Excellency, The Most Reverend José Arturo Cepeda
- Auxiliary Bishop of San Antonio
- Church: Roman Catholic Church
- Archdiocese: San Antonio
- Appointed: August 26, 2025
- Installed: October 12, 2025
- Other post: Titular Bishop of Tagase
- Previous post: Auxiliary Bishop of Detroit (2011-2025)

Orders
- Ordination: June 1, 1996 by Patrick Flores
- Consecration: May 5, 2011 by Allen Henry Vigneron, John Clayton Nienstedt, and John M. Quinn

Personal details
- Born: May 15, 1969 (age 57) San Luis Potosí, Mexico
- Education: Seminario Guadalupano Josefino; Our Lady of the Lake University; Assumption Seminary; St. Mary’s University; Pontifical University of St. Thomas Aquinas
- Motto: Audiendum, fiendum, nuntiandum (Hearing, becoming, proclaiming)

Styles of José Arturo Cepeda
- Reference style: His Excellency; The Most Reverend
- Spoken style: Your Excellency
- Religious style: Bishop

Ordination history of Arturo Cepeda
History
Episcopal consecration
- Consecrated by: Allen Henry Vigneron
- Date: May 5, 2011

José Arturo Cepeda Escobedo (born May 15, 1969), known as Arturo Cepeda, is a Mexican-American prelate of the Roman Catholic Church who has served as an auxiliary bishop for the Archdiocese of San Antonio since 2025. He worked as a priest in San Antonio from 1996 to 2011 and then as an auxiliary bishop of the Archdiocese of Detroit in Michigan from 2011 to 2025.

== Biography ==
=== Early life ===
Cepeda was born in San Luis Potosí City in Mexico on May 15, 1969, to Jose Cepeda and Maria del Socorro Escobedo. He attended Catholic primary and secondary schools there run by the Brothers and Sisters of Joseph. After devoting a year to spiritual formation, Cepeda entered the Seminario Guadalupano Josefino in San Luis Potosí.

After his family immigrated to San Antonio, Texas, when he was 19 years old, Cepeda continued his seminary studies at Our Lady of the Lake University there. He then entered College Seminary of the Immaculate Heart of Mary in Santa Fe, New Mexico, earning a bachelor's degree in Religious Studies with a minor in psychology. After returning to San Antonio, Cepeda obtained a Master of Divinity degree from Assumption Seminary.

=== Priesthood ===
On June 1, 1996, Cepeda was ordained to the priesthood by Archbishop Patrick Flores for the Archdiocese of San Antonio at St. Mary Magdalen Catholic Church in San Antonio. After his ordination, the archdiocese assigned Cepeda as parochial vicar at St. Magdalen Parish in San Antonio. During this period, he received a Master of Biblical Theology degree from St. Mary's University in San Antonio

The archdiocese then sent Cepeda to Rome to study at the Pontifical University of St. Thomas Aquinas. In 2005, he was awarded a Licentiate in Sacred Theology (STL) and a Doctorate in Sacred Theology (STD), defending his dissertation in spiritual theology.

After returning to Texas, Cepeda was assigned teaching and formation responsibilities at Assumption Seminary and the Oblate School of Theology in San Antonio. He also served as vocation director and faculty member for the Transitional Ministry Formation Program for the archdiocese, and as a member of the formation faculty of the St. Peter upon the Water Center in Ingram, Texas. Archbishop Jose Gómez appointed Cepeda as vice rector of Assumption Seminary in 2009 and rector in 2010.

=== Auxiliary Bishop of Detroit ===
Cepeda was appointed titular bishop of Tagase and auxiliary bishop of Detroit on April 18, 2011, by Pope Benedict XVI. He was consecrated at the Cathedral of the Most Blessed Sacrament in Detroit by Archbishop Allen Vigneron on May 5, 2011, with Archbishop John Nienstedt and Bishop John Quinn serving as co-consecrators. He became the youngest bishop in the US.

In November 2020, the US Conference of Catholic Bishops elected Cepeda as chair of the Committee on Cultural Diversity.

=== Auxiliary Bishop of San Antonio ===
On August 26, 2025, Cepeda was appointed an auxiliary bishop of the Archdiocese of San Antonio. He was installed on October 12, 2025.

Catholic Church titles
Preceded by -	Auxiliary Bishop of Detroit; 2011–2025	Succeeded by -
Preceded by Lionel Gendron	Roman Catholic Titular See of Tagase; 2011-present	Incumbent
Preceded by -	Auxiliary Bishop of San Antonio; 2025–present	Incumbent
