= PADRES =

Chicano Catholic priest organization

Padres Asociados para Derechos Religiosos, Educativos, y Sociales (Spanish for "Priests Associated for Religious, Education, and Social Rights") is a Chicano Catholic priest's organization. PADRES was founded in October 1969 by a group of Mexican-American priests who pushed for an end to discrimination towards Mexican Americans within the church hierarchy and in American society in general. PADRES effectively ceased to function in 1989, after accomplishing its primary objectives.

== Origin ==
In 1969, Father Ralph Ruiz of San Antonio, Texas, began meeting informally with other Mexican American priests in the area. At the meetings, the same subjects constantly came up for discussion: poverty and social problems in Mexican American parishes, ecclesiastic insensitivity and hostility toward Mexican and Mexican American culture, and the lack of an "indigenous" Mexican American clergy were among the most important.

The first official meeting of the group that would become PADRES was held from October 7–9, 1969 at LaSalle Catholic High School in West San Antonio. Some important figures in attendance were Fr. Henry Casso of San Antonio, a founder of MALDEF and a former director of the Bishop's Committee for the Spanish-Speaking, Fr. David Duran of Fresno, who later became the first chaplain of the United Farm Workers, and Fr. Virgil Elizondo, author of several works on Our Lady of Guadalupe. While Texan priests were in the majority, there was also clergy from Arizona, New Mexico, Colorado, Illinois, Wisconsin, Washington, and the Washington, D.C., and a few Protestant ministers. Los Angeles priests were conspicuously absent, not having been invited due to the Archdiocese's reputation for repressing progressive priests.

At the conference, the topics were much the same as at the informal meetings between Ruiz and his colleagues, but were undertaken in a much more formal manner. The convened priests chose the name "PADRES" for the organization, elected Fr. Ruiz provisional chairman, and set the date for a national congress for February of the following year. They agreed to hold it in Arizona, which was deemed "neutral ground".

Following the conference, Fr. Ruiz set about making arrangements for the national congress. He personally wrote every Mexican-American priest and also sent invitations to white clergy who served predominantly Mexican American parishes. He also wrote a letter to San Antonio Archbishop Francis James Furey to inform him of the congress, and another to the National Council of Catholic Bishops (NCCB), now called the United States Conference of Catholic Bishops, which put forth a set of resolutions and included a fact sheet highlighting PADRES' concerns.

The resolutions demanded:

- the appointment of Mexican-American bishops
- the appointment of Spanish-speaking priests as pastors in Spanish-speaking communities
- attention to the material needs of the poor and working classes, especially through the establishment of Catholic schools
- a Mexican-American unit of the National Liturgical Commission to adapt the liturgy to Mexican American culture
- support for the grape boycott

PADRES sought an official liaison with the NCCB, but were initially denied. After being pressured, however, the NCCB agreed to set up an "informal liaison committee" of five bishops: Furey, Manning of Los Angeles, Green of Tucson, Medeiros of Brownsville, and Buswell of Pueblo. The committee was ratified in December 1969.

== First national congress ==
The first national congress was held from February 2–6, 1970 in Tucson. There were more than 200 people in attendance, many of them uninvited. The largest group of crashers was a progressive group of priests, nuns, and laity from Northern California, most of whom were White American. Fr. Ruiz and the other hosts accommodated the other factions as best they could, but the radicals demanded an organization open to laity, which they wanted to call PUEBLOS.

To head off the usurpment of the organization, Ruiz and Fr. Edmundo Rodriguez spent the night following the first day of deliberations drafting a constitution that defined a priest's organization. The next morning, Fr. Ruiz addressed the people assembled. He told the people wishing to form an organization open to laity that they were welcome to do so, and to use the facilities, but that the organization of Chicano priests was meeting in the next room. As he proceeded to the next room, he was followed by the Mexican American priests. The result of the friction was the freezing out of the Anglo priests who wanted to help further the advancement of Mexican Americans.

The reasons for the exclusion were several: the laity were excluded because Ruiz and other founders knew that the opinions of priests carried much more weight with the hierarchy than those of the parishioners, and did not want their influence diluted. Sympathetic white priests were allowed to be dues-paying members, but were not permitted to vote in organizational proceedings. This was due to the paternalism the Catholic Church in the United States had shown toward the Mexican American population since the Mexican–American War, the result of which was the denial of positions of authority to Mexican Americans. PADRES feared having their leadership co-opted and so limited their membership for this reason as well.

The exclusion had several effects. For one, some Mexican American priests were alienated by the exclusion of the white priests, as were some of the white priests themselves. The Mexican American laity, religious brothers, and deacons, were also disappointed that they could not join the organization. The issue continued to fester, and motions were introduced yearly to expand membership. Slowly, more groups were included into PADRES, beginning with Mexican American deacons in 1972, Puerto Ricans in 1974, and finally all brothers, deacons, and priests in 1981.

On the other hand, restricting membership to Chicano priests allowed the group a greater sense of cohesion while simultaneously assuring that the leadership of the organization would remain in their hands. Many white priests understood this and joined as non-voting members.

== Activities ==
In April 1970, PADRES was incorporated in Washington, D.C. In 1971, the group was organized into seven regional chapters, each with its own director who was under the national executive director. At the 1971 national conference in Los Angeles, Fr. Alberto Carrillo delivered an address that articulated a social theory of discrimination within the Church. It analyzed the Church within the framework of majority-minority relations, and concluded that:

1. The majority assumes the minority incapable of policymaking and excludes members of that minority from the policymaking process. As a result, the majority makes policy affecting the minority.
2. The majority "blames the victim" for the problems of the minority
3. The majority acts as if there is no problem until it affects the majority itself, and finally,
4. The solution to the problem resides in the hands of the majority.

This analysis provided PADRES with an intellectual basis for their challenge against the Church, and held the Church to the same standards as secular organizations in regards to issues of social and political inclusion.

At the conference, PADRES members identified three goals: The eradication of lack of education, an increase in the religious consciousness, and improvement of the social conditions of Mexican Americans.

== Sources ==
- Martinez, Richard Edward. PADRES : a study of revolutionary Chicano priests (2002 Ph.D. dissertation). Ann Arbor, Michigan: UMI Dissertation Services, 2004.
