= Michael J. Boulette =

American Catholic prelate (born 1950)

His Excellency, The Most Reverend Michael J. Boulette
- Auxiliary Bishop Emeritus of San Antonio
- Archdiocese: San Antonio
- Appointed: January 23, 2017
- Installed: March 20, 2017
- Retired: September 9, 2025
- Other post: Titular Bishop of Hieron (2017–)

Orders
- Ordination: March 19, 1976 by Francis James Furey
- Consecration: March 20, 2017 by Gustavo García-Siller, Charles Victor Grahmann, and José Cepeda

Personal details
- Born: June 4, 1950 (age 76) Hudson Falls, New York, US
- Education: St. Mary's University; Trinity University; University of Notre Dame; Austin Presbyterian Theological Seminary
- Motto: Wisdom faith discernment
- Styles
- Reference style: His Excellency; The Most Reverend
- Spoken style: Your Excellency
- Religious style: Bishop

Michael Joseph Boulette (born June 4, 1950) is an American Catholic prelate who served as an auxiliary bishop for the Archdiocese of San Antonio from 2017 to 2025.

== Biography ==
=== Early life ===
Boulette was born in Hudson Falls, New York, on June 4, 1950. His family moved to Fredericksburg, Texas, in 1959, where he attended St. Mary’s School. Boulette graduated from St. John Seminary High School in San Antonio in 1968.

After high school, Boulette entered St. Mary's University in San Antonio, where he received a Bachelor of Arts in psychology, cum laude, in 1971. He continued his graduate education at Trinity University in San Antonio, being awarded a master's degree in psychology the next year. After deciding to become a priest, Boulette traveled to Indiana to attend the University of Notre Dame. He received a Master of Divinity there in 1975.

=== Priesthood ===
On March 19, 1976, Boulette was ordained to the priesthood at St. Mary's Church in Fredericksburg by Archbishop Francis James Furey for the Archdiocese of San Antonio. The archdiocese assigned Boulette as parochial vicar to St. James parish in Gonzales (1976 to 1980) and St. Ann parish in San Antonio (1980 to 1983).

In 1983, he was named director of spiritual formation and liturgy at Assumption Seminary in San Antonio. When Pope John Paul II visited San Antonio in 1987, Boulette also served as coordinator of hospitality for the visit.

Boulette attended the Austin Presbyterian Theological Seminary in Austin, Texas, in 1992–93, earning a Doctor of Preaching and Worship degree. He then served as pastor of Notre Dame Parish in Kerrville, Texas, for the next 11 years.

In 2004, Boulette founded and became the first director of St. Peter Upon the Water, a training center for Catholic spiritual directors in Ingram, Texas. In March 2005, Boulette was granted the title of monsignor by Pope John Paul II.

=== Auxiliary Bishop of San Antonio ===
Pope Francis appointed Boulette as titular bishop of Hieron and as an auxiliary bishop of San Antonio on January 23, 2017. Boulette was consecrated on March 20, 2017, at St. Mark the Evangelist Church in San Antonio by Archbishop Gustavo García-Siller, with Bishop Charles Grahmann and Bishop José Cepeda acting as co-consecrators. On September 9, 2025, Boulette's resignation was accepted by Pope Leo XIV.

Catholic Church titles
Preceded by -	Auxiliary Bishop of San Antonio; 2017-2025	Succeeded by -
