= Joseph Vincent Brennan =

American Catholic prelate (born 1954)

His Excellency, The Most Reverend Joseph Vincent Brennan
- Bishop of Fresno
- Church: Catholic Church; Latin Church
- Diocese: Fresno
- Appointed: March 5, 2019
- Installed: May 2, 2019
- Predecessor: Armando Xavier Ochoa
- Previous posts: Auxiliary Bishop of Los Angeles (2015‍–‍2019); Titular Bishop of Trofimiana (2015‍–‍2019)

Orders
- Ordination: June 21, 1980 by Timothy Manning
- Consecration: September 12, 2015 by Archbishop José Horacio Gómez, Joseph Martin Sartoris, and Blase J. Cupich

Personal details
- Born: March 20, 1954 (age 72) Van Nuys, California, US
- Education: St. John's Seminary (California)
- Motto: Caritas Christi urget nos (Latin for 'The love of Christ inspires us')

Styles of Joseph Vincent Brennan
- Reference style: His Excellency; The Most Reverend
- Spoken style: Your Excellency
- Religious style: Bishop

Joseph Vincent Brennan (born March 20, 1954) is an American Catholic prelate who has served as Bishop of Fresno in California since 2019. He previously served as an auxiliary bishop of the Archdiocese of Los Angeles in California from 2015 to 2019.

== Biography ==
=== Early life ===
Joseph Brennan was born on March 20, 1954, in Van Nuys, California. Deciding to become a priest, he entered Saint John's Seminary in Camarillo, California. Brennan received a Bachelor of Philosophy degree in 1976 and a Bachelor of Theology degree in 1980 from Saint John's.

=== Priesthood ===
Brennan was ordained a priest for the Archdiocese of Los Angeles at the Cathedral of St. Vibiana in Los Angeles by Cardinal Timothy Manning on June 21, 1980. After his 1980 ordination, Brennan served as associate pastor at three parishes in Southern California:

- Immaculate Heart of Mary in Los Angeles (1980 to 1983)
- St. Linus in Norwalk (1983 to 1987)
- Cathedral of St. Vibiana (1987 to 1991)

Brennan left St. Vibiana in 1991 to serve as a pastor at St. Linus. He would hold that position for the next 12 years. Starting in 1995, he also held the post of as chaplain to the Southern California Knights of Columbus. Brennan was appointed to the presbyteral council for the archdiocese in 2003.

The archdiocese in 2004 transferred Brennan from St. Linus to Holy Trinity Catholic Parish in San Pedro, California. The Vatican named a him a chaplain of his holiness, with the title of monsignor, in 2005. In 2012, Archbishop José Gómez selected Brennan to serve as moderator of the curia for the archdiocese. At that time, he became priest-in-residence at the Cathedral of Our Lady of the Angels and at Mother of Sorrows Catholic Parish. Brennan also served as the vicar general for the archdiocese.

=== Auxiliary Bishop of Los Angeles ===
Coat of arms as auxiliary bishop of Los Angeles.

Brennan was appointed by Pope Francis as titular bishop of Trofimiana and auxiliary bishop of Los Angeles on July 21, 2015. He was consecrated at the Cathedral of Our Lady of the Angels in Los Angeles by Archbishop José Gómez on September 8, 2015. Gómez made him his episcopal vicar for the San Fernando Pastoral Region.

Brennan was a board member of the following organizations:

- Catholic Education Foundation
- Williams Charitable Trust
- Together in Mission, an archdiocesan appeal

=== Bishop of Fresno ===
On March 5, 2019, Brennan was named bishop of Fresno by Pope Francis. He was installed on May 2, 2019.

==== Anglican controversy ====
In April 2026, Brennan participated in a ceremony for the consecration of an Anglican bishop. Brennan was not listed among the consecrating bishops, however, footage and photographs show Brennan standing with Anglican clergy during the ceremony.

His participation was viewed by some as "active participation in a non-Catholic ordination ceremony", which is forbidden under the 1983 Code of Canon Law. Pope Leo XIII previously declared Anglican orders "null and void" in Apostolicae curae (1896). No disciplinary action has been publicly taken against Brennan since the incident.

== Viewpoints ==
=== Abortion ===
Brennan opposes abortion. When Archbishop Salvatore J. Cordileone announced that the Speaker of the House of Representatives, San Francisco resident Nancy Pelosi, was prohibited from receiving communion in the Archdiocese of San Francisco, Brennan supported the decision.

=== Unions ===
In August 2022, Brennan marched with farm workers in support of the 2022 Agricultural Labor Relations Voting Choice Act enacted by the California State Legislature. The bill allowed farm workers to use mail-in ballots for union elections.

=== Vaccinations ===
In November 2020, during the COVID-19 pandemic, Brennan urged Catholics not to take the COVID-19 vaccines. He claimed that embryonic stem cells used in the development of these vaccines violated Catholic ethics.

== See also ==
- Catholic Church hierarchy
- Catholic Church in the United States
- Historical list of the Catholic bishops of the United States
- List of Catholic bishops of the United States
- Lists of patriarchs, archbishops, and bishops

Catholic Church titles
Preceded by Armando Xavier Ochoa	Bishop of Fresno; 2019–present	Succeeded by Incumbent
