= Anthony Dominic Pellicer =

American prelate (1824–1880)

- Bishop of San Antonio
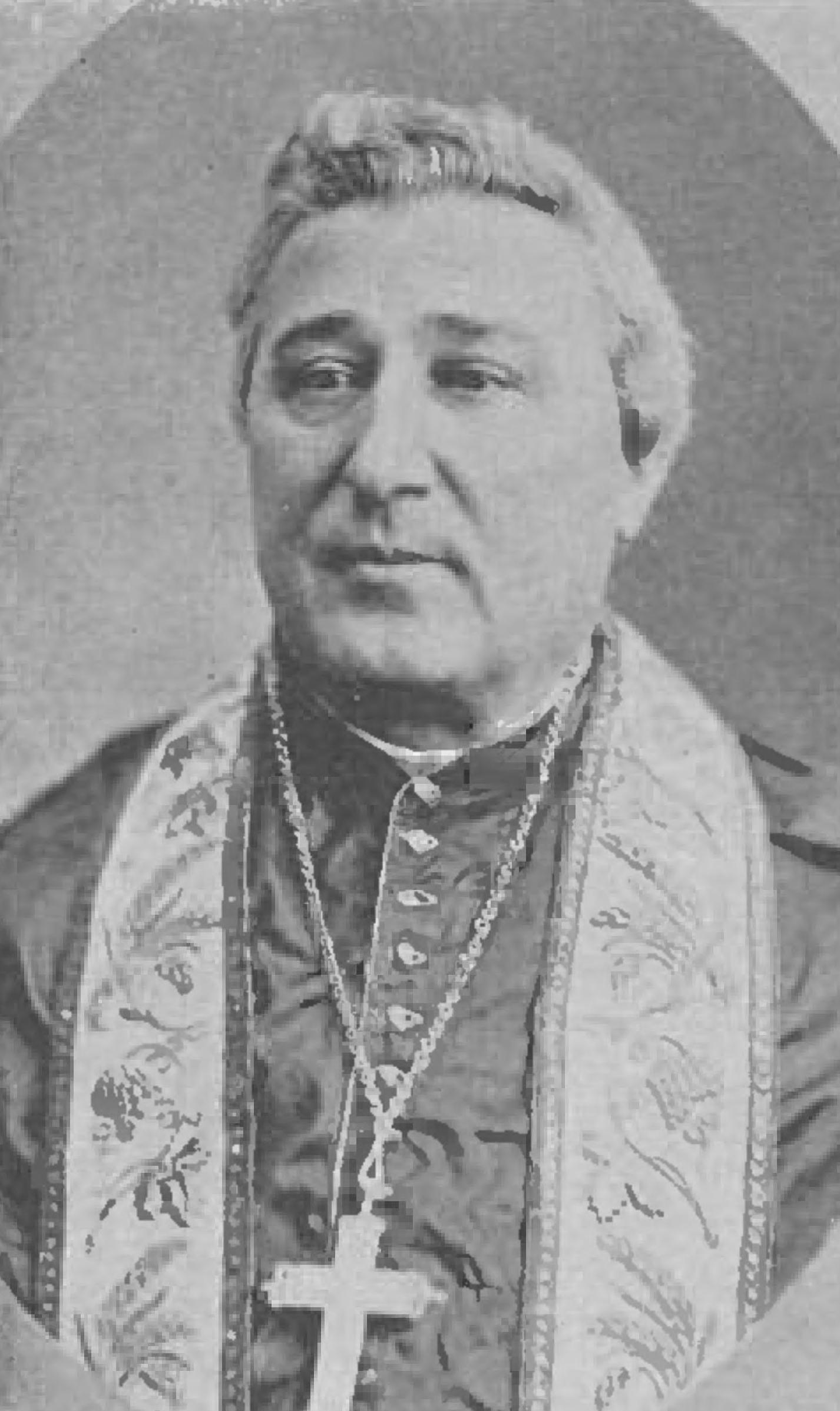
- Church: Catholic Church
- Diocese: Diocese of San Antonio
- Appointed: September 1, 1874
- Term ended: April 14, 1880
- Successor: John Neraz

Orders
- Ordination: August 15, 1850 by Michael Portier
- Consecration: December 8, 1874 by Napoléon-Joseph Perché

Personal details
- Born: December 7, 1824 St. Augustine, Florida
- Died: April 14, 1880 (aged 55) San Antonio, Texas

Anthony Dominic Pellicer (December 7, 1824 – April 14, 1880) was an American prelate of the Catholic Church. He was the first Bishop of San Antonio, serving from 1874 until his death in 1880.

== Biography ==
=== Early life and ministry ===
Pellicer was born on December 7, 1824, in St. Augustine, Florida, the son of Francisco Pellicer and Margarita Joaneda (who died in childbirth). His grandfather was Francisco Pellicer, a Menorcan carpenter who came to Florida as a member of Andrew Turnbull's colony at New Smyrna but later led the rebellion against him. He had a twin brother, Andrew, and was baptized as Antonio Domenzo Ambrosio Pellicer on July 5, 1825.

After his mother's death, Pellicer was raised in the home of his second cousin, Dominic Manucy. He and Manucy studied for the priesthood together at Spring Hill College in Mobile, Alabama, and both were ordained on August 15, 1850, by Bishop Michael Portier. After his ordination, Pellicer was appointed pastor of St. Peter's Church in Montgomery, where he built a new church and made expeditions to Mexico and Cuba to raise funds for the project. He served as a Confederate Army chaplain during the Civil War, and was later named rector of Immaculate Conception Cathedral in Mobile (1865) and vicar general of the diocese (1867).

=== Bishop of San Antonio ===
On September 1, 1874, Pellicer was appointed the first bishop of the newly erected Diocese of San Antonio, Texas, by Pope Pius IX. At the same time, his cousin, Father Manucy, was also assigned to Texas as Vicar Apostolic of Brownsville. Just as they were ordained priests together, Pellicer and Manucy both received their episcopal consecration on December 8, 1874, from Archbishop Napoléon-Joseph Perché at the cathedral in Mobile. Upon arriving in San Antonio, he was formally installed on December 27.

The Diocese of San Antonio was carved out of the Diocese of Galveston and, at the time, extended from the Colorado River to the Nueces River and from the Gulf of Mexico to El Paso County. During his first year as bishop, Pellicer reported there were 30,000 Catholics in the diocese served by 34 priests, 41 churches, 18 parochial schools, one seminary, one college, and one orphanage. By the end of his tenure, there was a Catholic population of 48,000 as well as 38 priests, 50 churches, and 25 parochial schools.

Pellicer, who suffered from diabetes, died at his residence in San Antonio on April 14, 1880, aged 55. He is buried beneath San Fernando Cathedral.
