= John Anthony Forest =

French-born clergyman

The Right Reverend John Anthony Forest
- Bishop of San Antonio
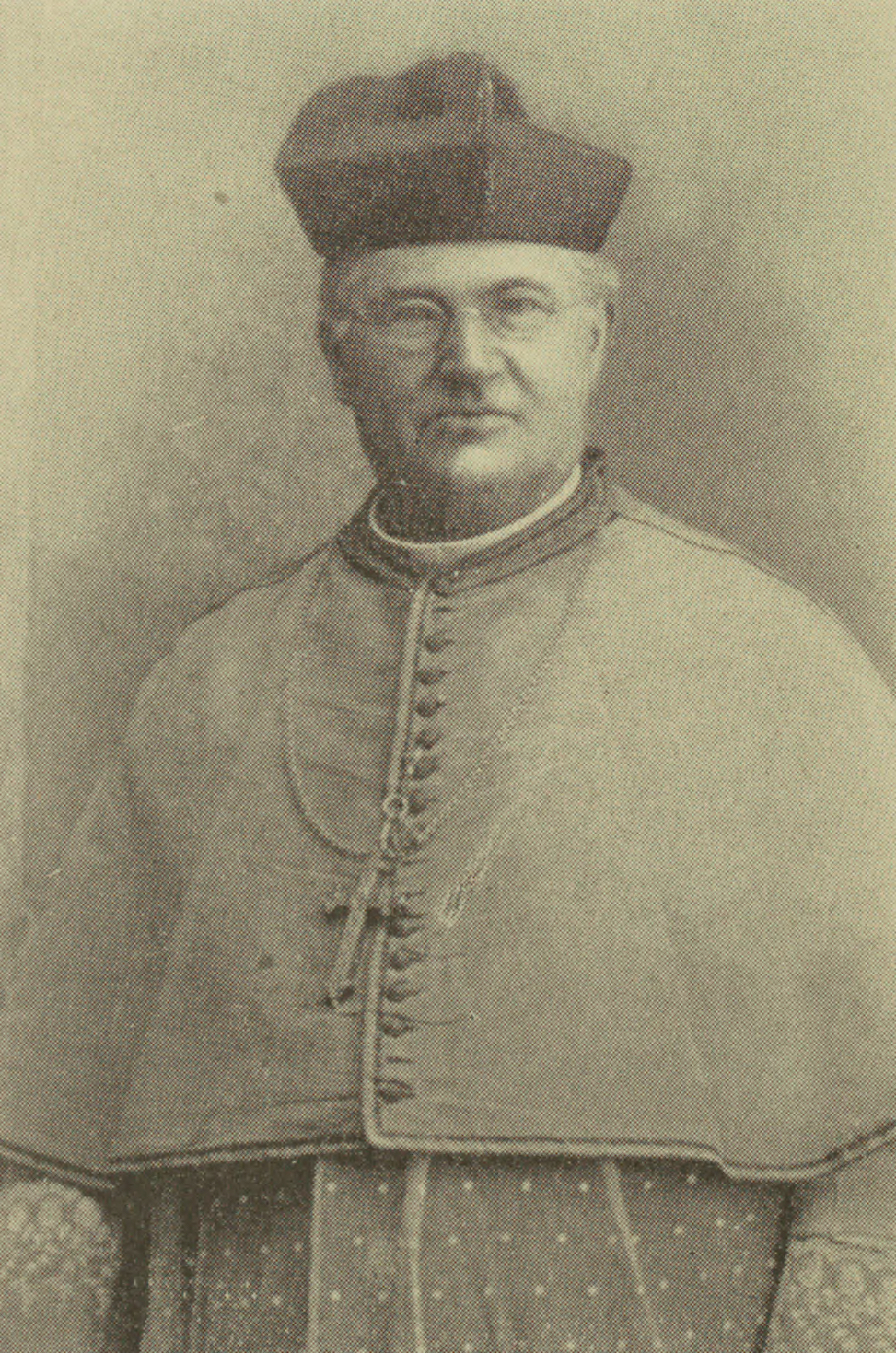
- Church: Catholic
- Diocese: San Antonio
- Appointed: 27 August 1895
- Predecessor: John Neraz
- Successor: John Shaw

Orders
- Ordination: 12 April 1863 by Claude Marie Dubuis
- Consecration: 28 October 1896 by Francis Janssens

Personal details
- Born: 26 December 1838 Saint Martin la Sauveté, France
- Died: 11 March 1911 (aged 72)

John Anthony Forest (December 26, 1838 – March 11, 1911) was a French-born clergyman of the Roman Catholic Church. He served as Bishop of San Antonio from 1895 until his death in 1911.

== Biography ==
John Forest was born in Saint-Martin-la-Sauveté, Loire, to Jean and Marie (née Thollet) Forest. He studied at the minor seminaries in Saint-Jodard and L'Argentière before entering Grand Seminary of St. Irénée in Lyons. While a subdeacon in Lyons, he accepted an invitation from Bishop Claude Marie Dubuis to serve as a missionary in the Diocese of Galveston in the U.S. state of Texas. With about fifty other seminarians, he sailed for New Orleans in 1863 but was initially refused admittance to the port by General Benjamin Butler, who suspected the group were allies of the Confederacy.

Forest was ordained to the priesthood by Bishop Dubois on April 12, 1863. Upon his arrival in Texas, he was stationed at St. Mary's Church near Smothers Creek in Lavaca County. He was afterward named pastor of Sacred Heart Church in Hallettsville, where he remained for thirty-two years.

On August 27, 1895, Forest was appointed the third Bishop of San Antonio by Pope Leo XIII. He received his episcopal consecration on the following October 28 from Archbishop Francis Janssens, with Bishops Edward Fitzgerald and Nicolaus Aloysius Gallagher serving as co-consecrators, in the Cathedral of San Fernando. During his tenure, he established several new churches, educational facilities, and charitable institutions. Due to his declining health, he received John William Shaw from the Diocese of Mobile as a coadjutor bishop in 1910. Shortly after Shaw's arrival, he retired to Santa Rosa Infirmary. He later died at age 72, and was buried in San Fernando Cemetery.

Catholic Church titles
Preceded by John Claude Neraz	Bishop of San Antonio; 1895–1911	Succeeded by John William Shaw
