= John Neraz =

French-born clergyman

The Right Reverend John Claude Neraz
- Bishop of San Antonio
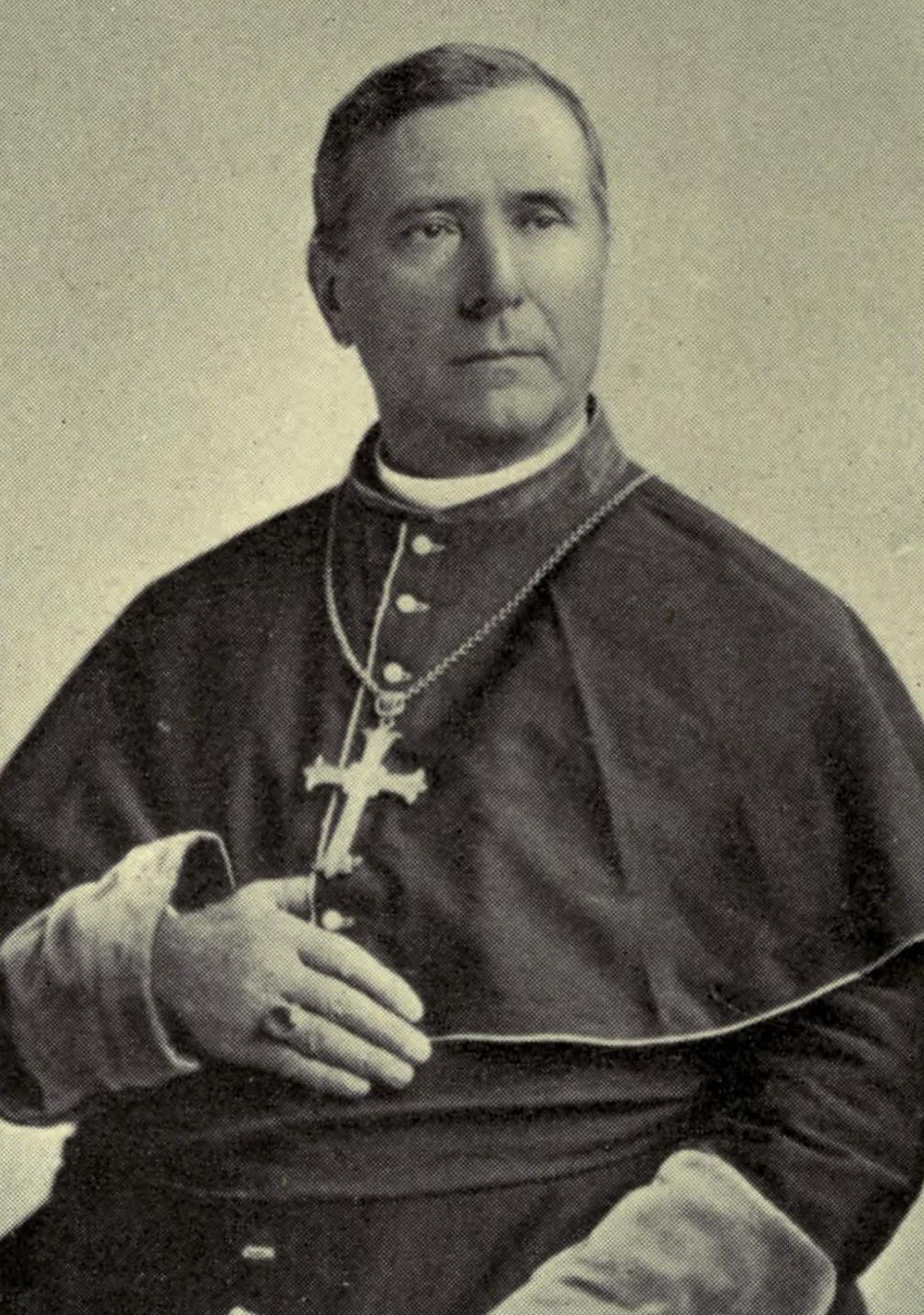
- Church: Catholic
- Diocese: San Antonio
- Appointed: 18 February 1881
- Predecessor: Anthony Pellicer
- Successor: John Anthony Forest
- Previous post: Apostolic Administrator of Brownsville (1887-1890)

Orders
- Ordination: 19 March 1853 by John Mary Odin
- Consecration: 8 May 1881 by Edward Fitzgerald

Personal details
- Born: 12 January 1828 Anse, France
- Died: 15 November 1894 (aged 66)

John Claude Neraz (January 12, 1828 – November 15, 1894) was a French-born clergyman of the Roman Catholic Church. He served as Bishop of San Antonio from 1881 until his death in 1894.

== Biography ==
John Claude Neraz was born in Anse, Rhône, to Jean and Marie Anne (née Bottet) Neraz. He studied at the minor seminaries in Saint-Jodard, Anse and Alix before entering the Grande Seminary of St. Irenée in Lyons. In 1852, he accepted an invitation from Bishop Jean-Marie Odin to serve as a missionary in the U.S. state of Texas. After reaching the Diocese of Galveston, he was ordained to the priesthood on February 19, 1853.

Neraz was then stationed in Nacogdoches, where he remained until he was sent to Liberty County in 1864. He was assigned to San Antonio in 1866, and afterward was sent to Laredo, where he built St. Augustine's Church. He served as pastor of San Fernando Church in San Antonio (1873–1881) as well as vicar general to Bishop Anthony Dominic Pellicer (1874–1881).

On February 18, 1881, Neraz was appointed the second Bishop of San Antonio by Pope Leo XIII. He received his episcopal consecration on the following May 8 from Bishop Edward Fitzgerald, with Bishops Dominic Manucy and Claude Marie Dubuis serving as co-consecrators, in the Cathedral of San Fernando. In 1884, he attended the Third Plenary Council of Baltimore, where he was active in discussions on the evangelization of the African American community. During his tenure, he oversaw the establishment of St. Edward's College, the first parochial school in the diocese, a new chancery building, and a church for the black Catholics of San Antonio. Between 1884 and 1890, he also served as apostolic administrator of the Vicariate Apostolic of Brownsville.

Neraz died after a brief illness at age 66. He was buried in San Fernando Cemetery.

== See also ==
Catholic Church titles
Preceded by Anthony Dominic Pellicer	Bishop of San Antonio; 1881–1894	Succeeded by John Anthony Forest
