= Patrick Flores =

American prelate

His Excellency, The Most Reverend Patricio Flores
- Archbishop of San Antonio
- Flores in 1969
- Church: Roman Catholic Church
- Archdiocese: San Antonio
- Installed: October 13, 1979
- Term ended: December 29, 2004
- Predecessor: Francis James Furey
- Successor: José Horacio Gómez

Orders
- Ordination: May 26, 1956 by Wendelin Nold
- Consecration: May 5, 1970 by Luigi Raimondi, Francis James Furey, John Louis Morkovsky

Personal details
- Born: July 26, 1929 Ganado, Texas
- Died: January 9, 2017 (aged 87) San Antonio, Texas
- Motto: Laborabo non mihi sed omnibus (English: "I will work not for myself but for others")

Styles of Patrick Flores
- Reference style: The Most Reverend
- Spoken style: His Excellency
- Religious style: Monsignor
- Posthumous style: not applicable

Patricio Fernández Flores (July 26, 1929 – January 9, 2017) was an American prelate of the Catholic Church. He served from 1979 to 2004 as archbishop of the Archdiocese of San Antonio in Texas, bishop of the Diocese of El Paso in Texas from 1978 to 1979, and auxiliary bishop of the Archdiocese of San Antonio from 1970 to 1978.

Flores was the first Mexican-American to become a Catholic bishop.

== Biography ==
=== Early life ===
Patrick Flores was born on January 9, 1929, to Patricio and Trinidad Fernandez de Flores, American migrant workers, in Ganado, Texas. In the tenth grade, Patrick Flores considered dropping out of high school after his father became ill, but changed his plans after a bishop offered to finance his education. Flores worked as a janitor at a local cantina.

Flores graduated from Catholic Kirwin High School in Galveston, Texas. He studied at St. Mary's Seminary in La Porte, Texas and at St. Mary's Seminary in Houston.

=== Priesthood ===
Flores was ordained into the priesthood for the Diocese of Galveston-Houston on May 26, 1956, by Bishop Wendelin Nold in Galveston.

In the early 1960s, Flores directed the Christian Family Movement in the Galveston-Houston diocese and the Bishop's Committee for the Spanish Speaking, a ministry that encouraged bilingual congregations. In October 1969, Flores joined 47 other Hispanic priests to establish PADRES Padres Asociados para Derechos Religiosos, Educativos, y Sociales (Spanish for "Priests Associated for Religious, Education, and Social Rights"), an organization meant to draw attention to the problems of Hispanics in the church and society.

=== Auxiliary Bishop of San Antonio ===
Pope Paul VI appointed Flores on March 9, 1970. as an auxiliary bishop of the Archdiocese of San Antonio.and titular bishop of Italica. He was consecrated on May 5, 1970. by Archbishop Luigi Raimondi. Flores chose as his episcopal motto Laborabo non mihi sed omnibus, "I will work not for myself but for others".

Also in May 1970, Flores was appointed chairman of the Texas State Advisory Committee to the U.S. Commission on Civil Rights. He was appointed in July 1970 as national chaplain for the League of United Latin American Citizens. In 1972, Flores co-founded the Mexican-American Cultural Center in San Antonio.

=== Bishop of El Paso ===
On April 4, 1978, Pope Paul VI appointed Flores as bishop of the Diocese of El Paso. He was installed on May 23, 1978.

=== Archbishop of San Antonio ===
On August 23, 1979, Pope John Paul II appointed Flores as archbishop of the Archdiocese of San Antonio. He was installed on October 13, 1979.

In 1980, Flores became a member of the Hispanic Caucus Committee, and in 1981 founded Catholic Television of San Antonio, the first diocesan television station in the United States. In 1997, when Reverend Billy Graham announced a religious crusade at the Alamodome in San Antonio, Flores taped radio spots in English and Spanish to promote the event. Graham later credited Flores for the large response.

In 1993, Flores filed a lawsuit against the City of Boerne, Texas. St. Peter's Parish in Boerne had wanted to expand their church building to accommodate more worshipers, but the city refused permission because it was an historic adobe structure. The archdiocese sued the city, citing provisions of the federal Religious Freedom Restoration Act (RFRA) of 1993. The lawsuit eventually led to the landmark U.S. Supreme Court decision City of Boerne v. Flores (1997). Ruling in favor of the City of Boerne, the Supreme Court struck down certain RFRA provisions as unconstitutionally exceeding the powers granted to the Congress under Section Five of the Fourteenth Amendment of the US Constitution.

On June 27, 2000, Nelson Escolero, a native of El Salvador and a legal U.S. resident, held Flores and his secretary hostage with a fake grenade for over nine hours at the Catholic Chancery. Escolero had recently been arrested for driving with a suspended license and feared deportation to El Salvador. Escolero surrendered peacefully to police that evening. Flores was later credited with helping to defuse the standoff.

The archdiocese on February 3, 2003, settled a lawsuit brought by Julia Villegas Phelps for $300,000. She claimed to have been sexually assaulted by Michael Kenny, an archdiocese priest, and that Flores had dismissed her accusations. Kenny later admitted to Flores to having a sexual affair with Villegas Phelps. When questioned in a legal deposition, Flores remarked, "Our priests are not babies, I'm not going to keep an eye on them 24 hours a day."

=== Retirement and legacy ===
After reaching the mandatory retirement age of 75, Flores submitted his letter of resignation as Archbishop of the Archdiocese of San Antonio to Pope John Paul II. The pope accepted his resignation on December 29, 2004.

On October 6, 2007, A Migrant's Masterpiece an hour-long documentary depicting Flores' life premiered in San Antonio. Directed by Hector Galan, it seeks to place the archbishop's life in the context of "the history of Latinos in Texas, [and] the Civil Rights Movement in Texas" according to Pat Rogers, communications director for the Archdiocese of San Antonio. The film was funded through private donations to the Archdiocese and uses rare archival film and interviews with the Flores' family. It eventually aired on PBS.

On May 27, 2015, Flores and the archdiocese were accused in a lawsuit of ignoring sexual abuse allegations against a priest. The plaintiff claimed that while he was a minor in a San Antonio orphanage in the 1980s, he was sexually abused by Jesus Armando Dominguez, then a seminarian at Assumption Seminary. The plaintiff said that he brought his complaints to Flores, who did not follow through on a promise to investigate them. Dominguez later fled to Mexico to avoid criminal charges in California.

Flores died on January 9, 2017, of congestive heart failure and pneumonia at the Padua retirement home in San Antonio.

== Resources ==
- Davidson, John (July 1981). "A Simple Man". Texas Monthly. Vol. 1981, no. July. p. 127 et. seq.
- Special section - San Antonio Express-News
- Bishop Flores at Catholic hierarchy
- Biography at Answers.com
