= Gustavo García-Siller =

American Catholic prelate (born 1956)

His Excellency, The Most Reverend Gustavo García-Siller MSpS
- Archbishop of San Antonio
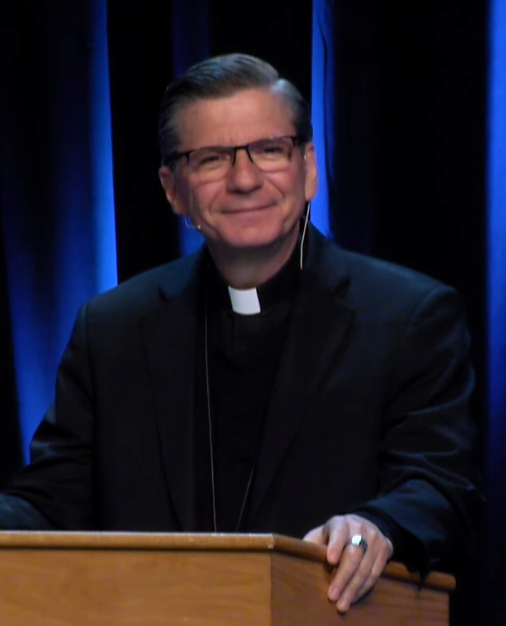
- García-Siller in 2018, speaking at the Steubenville Power and Purpose Conference
- Archdiocese: San Antonio
- Appointed: October 14, 2010
- Installed: November 23, 2010
- Predecessor: José Horacio Gómez
- Previous posts: Auxiliary Bishop of Chicago and Titular Bishop of Oescus (2003-2010)

Orders
- Ordination: June 22, 1984 by Ricardo Watty Urquidi
- Consecration: March 19, 2003 by Francis George, Raymond E. Goedert, and Ricardo Watty Urquidi

Personal details
- Born: December 21, 1956 (age 69) San Luis Potosí, Mexico
- Motto: Ven Holy Spirit ven
- Styles
- Reference style: His Excellency; The Most Reverend
- Spoken style: Your Excellency
- Religious style: Archbishop

Ordination history
History
Episcopal consecration
- Consecrated by: Francis George
Episcopal succession
Bishops consecrated by Gustavo García-Siller as principal consecrator
- Michael Sis: January 27, 2014
- Michael Fors Olson: January 29, 2014
- Michael Joseph Boulette: March 20, 2017
- Gary W. Janak: April 20, 2021
- John Jairo Gomez: June 30, 2026

Gustavo García-Siller (born December 21, 1956) is a Mexican American Catholic prelate who serves as archbishop of San Antonio in Texas. He previously served as an auxiliary bishop of the Archdiocese of Chicago in Illinois from 2003 to 2010.

== Biography ==
=== Early life ===
The eldest of fifteen children, García-Siller was born on December 21, 1956, in San Luis Potosí, Mexico. He entered the Missionaries of the Holy Spirit religious order in Mexico City in 1973. The Missionaries sent him to the United States in 1980 to minister to migrant workers in California. He also studied at St. John's Seminary in Camarillo, California, obtaining Master of Divinity and Master of Theology degrees.

=== Priesthood ===
Garcia-Siller was ordained to the priesthood for the Missionaries on June 22, 1984. The Missionaries then assigned him as an associate pastor at St. Joseph Parish in Selma, California until 1988. He then furthered his studies at the Western Institute of Technology and Higher Education (ITESO) in Guadalajara, Mexico, earning a Master of Arts in psychology, and at the Pontifical Gregorian University in Rome.

Returning to the United States in 1990, Garcia-Siller was named as rector of the Holy Spirit Missionaries' houses of studies in Lynwood and Long Beach, California, and in Portland, Oregon. On December 15, 1998, Garcia-Siller became a citizen of the United States.

In 1999, Garcia-Siller was appointed rector of the Missionaries' theologate in Oxnard, California, also serving pastoral roles in three parishes of the Archdiocese of Los Angeles. The Missionaries named him as superior of their vicariate for the United States and Canada in 2002.

=== Auxiliary Bishop of Chicago ===
On January 24, 2003, Garcia-Siller was appointed auxiliary bishop of Chicago and Titular Bishop of Oescus by Pope John Paul II. He received his episcopal consecration on March 19, 2003, at Holy Name Cathedral in Chicago from Cardinal Francis George, with Bishops Raymond E. Goedert and Ricardo Urquidi serving as co-consecrators. As an auxiliary bishop, Garcia-Siller served as episcopal vicar for Vicariate V and the Cardinal's liaison to the Hispanic community.

=== Archbishop of San Antonio ===
On October 14, 2010, Pope Benedict XVI named Garcia-Siller to succeed José Gómez as Archbishop of San Antonio. His installation took place on November 23, 2010. Along with Gómez, he is one of the highest-ranking Mexican-American bishops in the United States.

In March 2024, Garcia-Siller banned the Mission of Divine Mercy (MDM), a Catholic retreat house in New Braunfels, Texas, and the priest who was running it. MDM had refused to delete a posting on its website in which a member said that God told him Pope Francis was a "usurper" and an "enemy of the Church".

== See also ==
- Catholic Church hierarchy
- Catholic Church in the United States
- Historical list of the Catholic bishops of the United States
- List of Catholic bishops of the United States
- Lists of patriarchs, archbishops, and bishops

Catholic Church titles
Preceded by José Horacio Gómez	Archbishop of San Antonio; 2010–present	Incumbent
Preceded by -	Auxiliary Bishop of Chicago; 2003-2010	Succeeded by -
