= Leonardo Rolheiser =

Argentine footballer

Leonardo Enrique Rolheiser is an Argentine footballer who plays as a midfielder for Racing Club de Avellaneda of the Primera Division Argentina.

== Biography Football ==
He debuted in an official match against Colon de Santa Fe (1–1 tie) replacing Mauro Camoranesi. His first spell with the first team was in a friendly against River Plate, also 1–1 tie in 2013. Currently, he has played 5 games without scoring goals. In January 2014 Mostaza Merlo named Rolheiser in the squad going to preseason in Tandil and would sign his first contract.

=== Teams ===
Team	Season	League		Cup National		Cup Internac.		Total	
Team	Season	Matches	Goals	Matches	Goals	Matches	Goals	Matches	Goals
Racing Club	2013	5	0	-	-	-	-	5	0
Racing Club	2014	0	0	-	-	-	-	0	0
Total		5	0	-	-	-	-	5	0

=== External links ===
- Leonardo Rolheiser at ESPN FC
- Leonardo Rolheiser at FBref.com
