= Bavagaliana =

Bavagaliana was a town in the Roman province of Byzacena, now part of Tunisia.

It became at some stage the seat of a Christian bishopric. The only diocesan bishop of the see who is known by name was Bonifacius, who lived at the time of Thrasamund, the Vandal king (450–523) who ended the many years of persecution of Catholic Christians that began under his uncle Huneric.

Bonifacius was primate of Byzacena in 517 and a participant in the Council of Carthage (525).

No longer a residential bishopric, Bavagaliana is today listed by the Catholic Church as a titular see.
