= Ronald Rolheiser =

Catholic priest and theologian (born 1947)

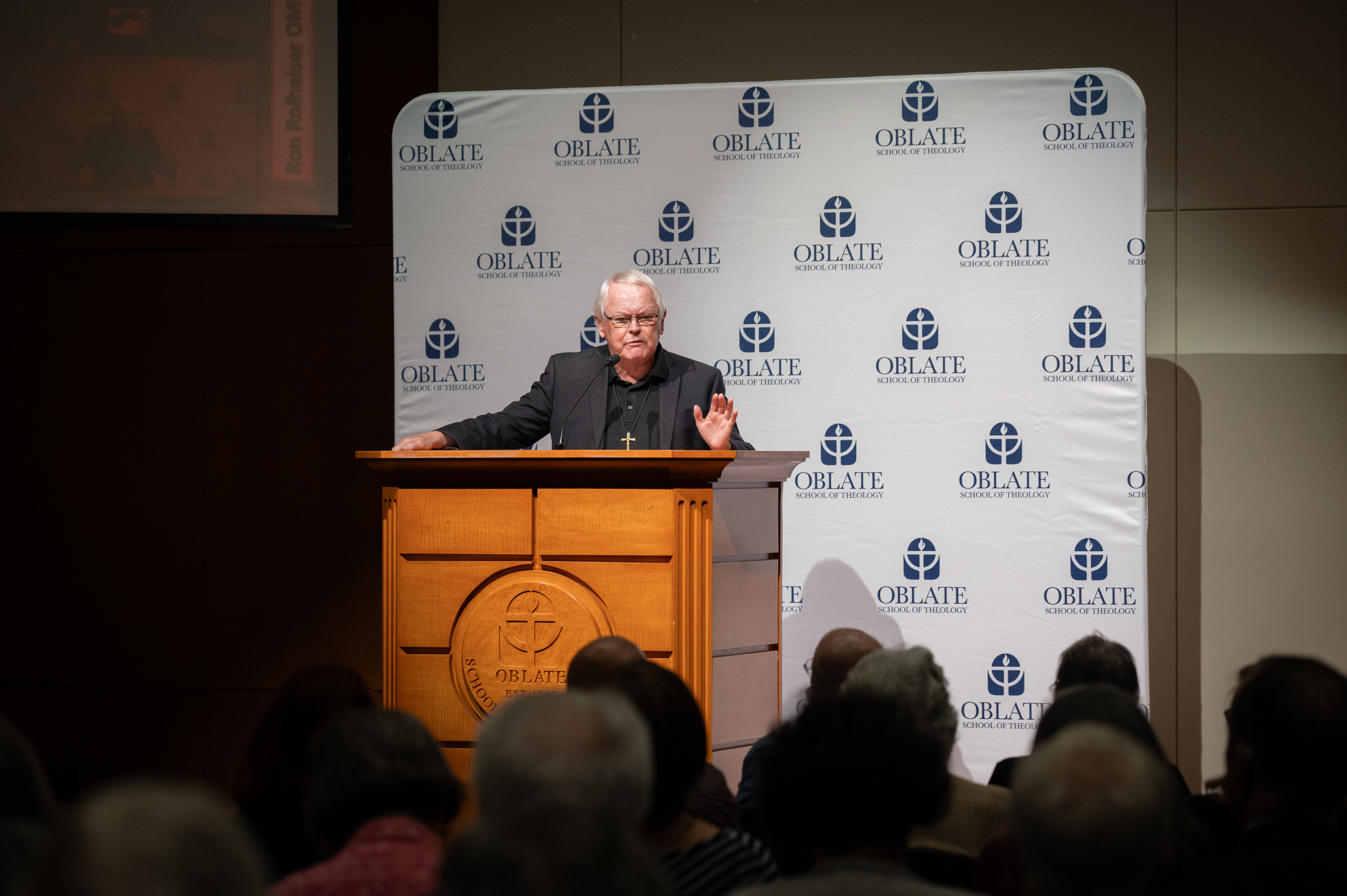
Rolheiser lectures on Christian spirituality as an academic discipline at Oblate School of Theology.

Ronald Rolheiser OMI (born 1947) is a Canadian Catholic priest and theologian. He is a member of the Missionary Oblates of Mary Immaculate and teaches at the Oblate School of Theology in San Antonio, Texas.

== Biography ==
Rolheiser was born in Cactus Lake, Saskatchewan, and received his doctorate at the University of Louvain. He is a member of the Catholic Theological Society of America, the Canadian Theological Society and the Religious Studies Association of Alberta.

In August 2005, he was elected president of the Oblate School of Theology in San Antonio, Texas. He has since retired from the position and now teaches classes for Oblate's PhD and MA students in Christian spirituality. Prior to moving to Oblate School of Theology, Rolheiser taught for many years at Newman Theological College in Edmonton, Alberta. Rolheiser is a specialist in the fields of spirituality and systematic theology.

Rolheiser has a regular column in the Catholic Herald, which is featured in approximately 90 newspapers in five countries. His most successful book, The Holy Longing, has sold over 800,000 copies. Rolheiser maintains a busy schedule of presentations for conferences, retreats and workshops in Canada and the United States.

== Books ==
- The Shattered Lantern: Rediscovering a Felt Presence of God, Crossroad, 1995, rev. ed. 2001. ISBN 0-8245-1884-5
- Against an Infinite Horizon: The Finger of God in Our Everyday Lives, Crossroad, 1995, rev. ed. 2001. ISBN 978-0-8245-1586-7
- The Holy Longing: Guidelines for a Christian Spirituality, Doubleday, 1999. ISBN 978-0-385-49418-2
- The Restless Heart: Finding Our Spiritual Home in Times of Loneliness, Doubleday, 2004. ISBN 978-0-385-51114-8
- Forgotten Among the Lilies: Learning to Love Beyond Our Fears, Doubleday, 2007. ISBN 978-0-385-51232-9
- Our One Great Act of Fidelity: Waiting for Christ in the Eucharist, Doubleday, 2011. ISBN 978-0-307-88705-4
- Prayer: Our Deepest Longing, Franciscan Media, 2013. ISBN 978-1-61636-657-5
- Sacred Fire: A Vision for a Deeper Human and Christian Maturity, Image, 2014. ISBN 978-0-8041-3914-4
- The Passion and the Cross, Franciscan Media, 2015. ISBN 978-1-61636-812-8
- Bruised and Wounded: Struggling to Understand Suicide, Paraclete Press, 2017. ISBN 978-1-64060-0843
- Wrestling with God: Finding Hope and Meaning in Our Daily Struggles to Be Human, Image, 2018. ISBN 978-0-8041-3946-5
- Domestic Monastery: Creating a Spiritual Life at Home, Darton, Longman and Todd Ltd, 2019. ISBN 978-0-232-53412-2
- The Fire Within: Desire, Sexuality, Longing, and God, Paraclete Press, 2021. ISBN 978-1-64060-666-1
- Seeking Spirituality; Guidelines for a Christian Spirituality for the Twenty-First, Hodder & Stoughton, 1998. ISBN 978-0-340-65623-5
- Daybreaks: Daily Reflections for Lent and Easter Week, Liguori Publisher, 2020, ISBN 978-0-7648-2820-1
- Secularity and the Gospel, Being Missionaries to Our Children, Crossroad Publishing Co, U.S. 2006. ISBN 978-0-8245-2412-8
- Spirituality for a Restless Culture, Twenty Third Pubns, 1991, ISBN 978-0-89622-469-8
- Catholic Spirituality, Hodder & Stoughton Religious 1998. ISBN 978-0-340-67117-7
- Chastity and the Soul: You Are Holy Ground, Paraclete Press, 2024. ISBN 978-1-64060-947-1
- The Loneliness Factor: Its Religious and Spiritual Meaning, 1979. Dimension Books. ASIN B000JPGQEK
- Spiritual Maturity: Blessing Others as the Ultimate Mark and Fruit of Maturity, Marymount Institute Press 2015. ISBN 978-1-941392-03-4
- Insane for the Light: A Spirituality for Our Wisdom Years, Penguin Random House, 2025. ASIN B0DWQRMZQD
