= Francis James Furey =

American prelate

His Excellency, The Most Reverend Francis James Furey
- Archbishop of San Antonio; Titular Bishop of Temnus
- Church: Roman Catholic Church
- See: Archdiocese of San Antonio
- Installed: May 13, 1969
- Term ended: April 23, 1979
- Predecessor: Robert Emmet Lucey
- Successor: Patrick Flores
- Other posts: Bishop of San Diego (1966–1969); Coadjutor Bishop of San Diego (1963–1966); Auxiliary Bishop of Philadelphia (1960–1963)

Orders
- Ordination: March 15, 1930 by Basilio Pompili
- Consecration: December 22, 1960 by Egidio Vagnozzi

Personal details
- Born: February 22, 1905 Summit Hill, Pennsylvania, US
- Died: April 23, 1979 (aged 74) San Antonio, Texas, US
- Education: St. Charles Borromeo Seminary; Pontifical Roman Major Seminary
- Motto: Ipsam sequens non devias (Follow, do not deviate)

Francis James Furey (February 22, 1905 – April 23, 1979) was an American prelate of the Roman Catholic Church.

He served as auxiliary bishop of the Archdiocese of Philadelphia in Pennsylvania from 1960 to 1863, as bishop of the Diocese of San Diego in California from 1966 to 1969 and as archbishop of the Archdiocese of San Antonio in Texas from 1969 to 1979.

Styles of Francis James Furey
- Reference style: The Most Reverend
- Spoken style: Your Excellency
- Religious style: Monsignor
- Posthumous style: not applicable

== Biography ==
=== Early life ===
The eldest of five children, Francis Furey was born on February 22, 1905, in Summit Hill, Pennsylvania, to John and Anna (née O'Donnell) Furey. After attending public schools in Coaldale, Pennsylvania, he graduated from St. Mary's High School in 1920 as valedictorian. Deciding to become a priest, Furey entered St. Charles Borromeo Seminary in Philadelphia, Pennsylvania, studying there for four years. He then traveled to Rome to enter the Pontifical Roman Seminary, where he received a Doctor of Philosophy degree in 1926 and a Doctor of Sacred Theology degree in 1930.

=== Priesthood ===
Furey was ordained to the priesthood in Rome by Cardinal Basilio Pompili on March 15, 1930. Following his return to Pennsylvania, Cardinal Dennis Dougherty appointed Furey as his private secretary. Furey was named president in 1936 of Immaculata College in East Whiteland Township, Pennsylvania. He left Immaculata College in 1946 to become rector of St. Charles Borromeo Seminary. The Vatican elevated Buddy to the rank of domestic prelate in 1947. In 1958, Furey left St. Charles to serve as pastor of St. Helena's Parish in Philadelphia.

=== Auxiliary Bishop of Philadelphia ===
On August 17, 1960, Furey was appointed as an auxiliary bishop of Philadelphia and titular bishop of Temnus by Pope John XXIII. He received his episcopal consecration on December 22, 1960, from Archbishop Egidio Vagnozzi, with Bishops Joseph McShea and Joseph McCormick serving as co-consecrators.

=== Coadjutor Bishop and Bishop of San Diego ===
Pope Paul VI appointed Furey as coadjutor bishop of San Diego on July 21, 1963 to assist Bishop Charles F. Buddy. After Buddy's death on March 5, 1966, Furey automatically succeeded him as bishop. He served on the administrative tribunal of the Second Vatican Council in Rome from 1962 to 1965.

=== Archbishop of San Antonio ===
On May 23, 1969, Furey was appointed as the third archbishop of San Antonio by Paul VI. After his installation, Furey chose to reside two-room apartment in a poor section of San Antonio, Texas, rather than the bishop's residence.

Furey established one of the first diocesan commissions for Mexican American affairs in the United States, and promoted the candidacy in 1970 of Reverend Patrick Flores as the first Mexican American bishop in the country. Furey was an outspoken supporter of Communities Organized for Public Service, a community organizing group in San Antonio. He also supported the Farah strike of 1973 in El Paso, Texas, and the lettuce boycotts of the Texas Farm Workers Union. He held various offices within the National Conference of Catholic Bishops, including chair of the Committee for the Campaign for Human Development.

Furey served as chaplain of the Texas State Council of the Knights of Columbus and bishop protector of the Catholic War Veterans of the US. He was appointed by Texas Governor Preston Smith to the 1970 commission for the creation of the John Fitzgerald Kennedy Memorial in Dallas, Texas. Furey was an honorary member of the United States Marine Corps.

=== Death and legacy ===
Francis Furey died of cancer in San Antonio on April 23, 1979, at age 74. He was buried in Holy Cross Cemetery in San Antonio.

=== Honorary degrees ===
- La Salle College in Philadelphia
- Mount St. Mary's University in Emmitsburg, Maryland
- Our Lady of the Lake University in San Antonio
- St. John's University in Brooklyn, New York
- St. Joseph College in Philadelphia
- Villanova University in Villanova, Pennsylvania

Catholic Church titles
Preceded by –	Auxiliary Bishop of Philadelphia; 1960–1966	Succeeded by –
Preceded by Miguel de Andrea	Titular Bishop of Temnus; 1960–1966	Succeeded by Vacant
Preceded by Charles F. Buddy	Bishop of San Diego; 1966–1969	Succeeded by Leo Thomas Maher
Preceded by Robert Emmet Lucey	Archbishop of San Antonio; 1969–1979	Succeeded by Patrick Flores
