= José Horacio Gómez =

American Catholic prelate (born 1951)

His Excellency, The Most Reverend José Horacio Gómez
- Archbishop of Los Angeles
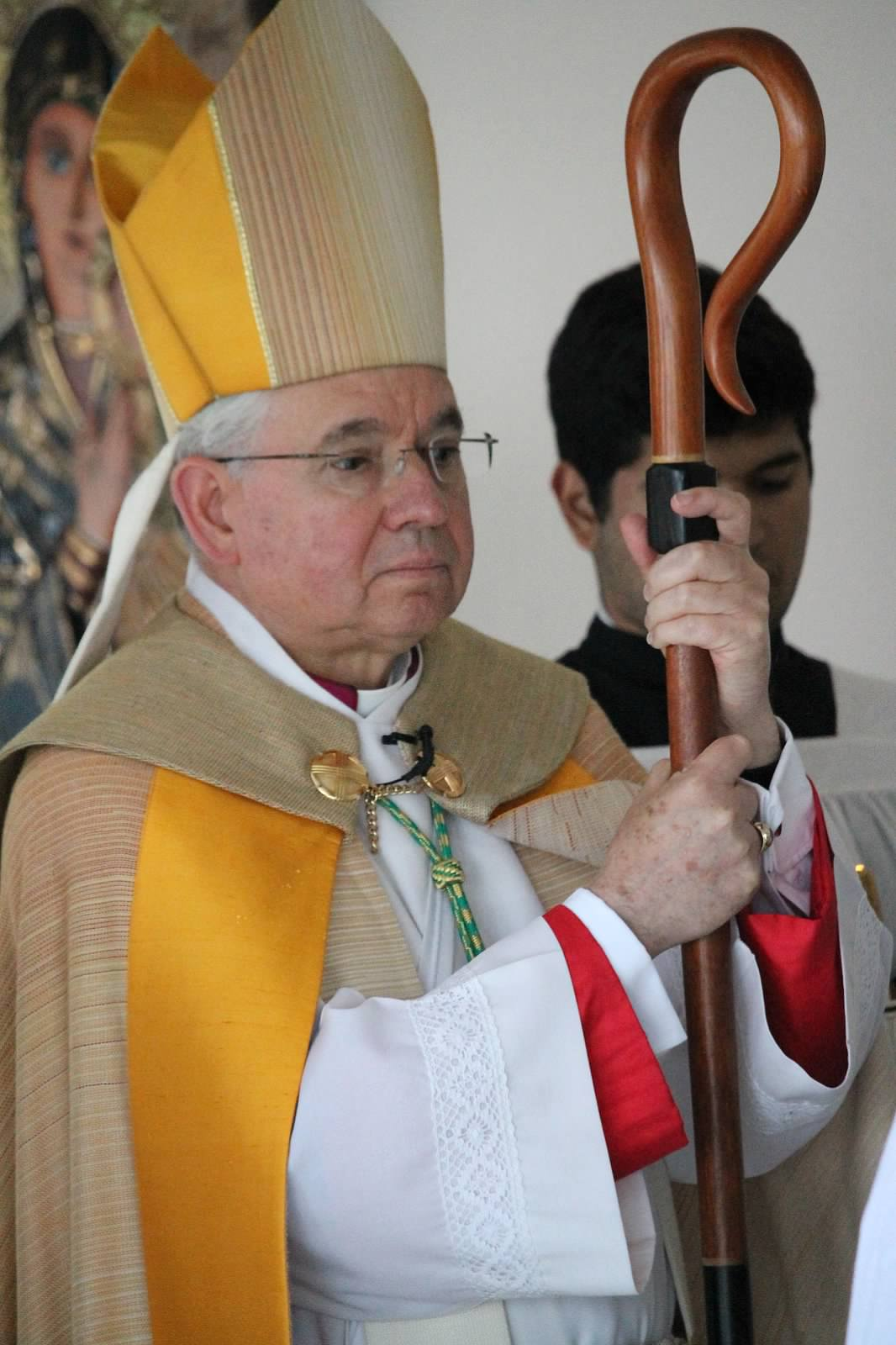
- Gómez in 2016
- Archdiocese: Los Angeles
- Appointed: April 6, 2010 (Coadjutor)
- Installed: March 1, 2011
- Predecessor: Roger Mahony
- Previous posts: President, United States Conference of Catholic Bishops (2019–2022); Coadjutor Archbishop of Los Angeles (2010–2011); Archbishop of San Antonio (2004–2010); Auxiliary Bishop of Denver and Titular Bishop of Belali (2001–2004)

Orders
- Ordination: August 15, 1978 by Franz König
- Consecration: March 26, 2001 by Charles Chaput, Joseph Fiorenza, and Javier Echevarría Rodríguez

Personal details
- Born: José Horacio Gómez Velasco; December 26, 1951 (age 74) Monterrey, Nuevo León, Mexico
- Denomination: Catholic
- Education: Monterrey Institute of Technology; National University of Mexico; University of Navarre
- Motto: Adeamus cum fiducia ad thronum gratiae (Latin for 'Let us confidently approach the throne of grace')
- Styles
- Reference style: His Excellency; The Most Reverend
- Spoken style: Your Excellency
- Religious style: Archbishop

Ordination history
History
Priestly ordination
- Ordained by: Franz König
- Date: August 15, 1978
Episcopal consecration
- Principal consecrator: Charles J. Chaput
- Co-consecrators: Joseph Fiorenza, Javier Echevarría Rodríguez
- Date: March 26, 2001
Episcopal succession
Bishops consecrated by José Horacio Gómez as principal consecrator
- Kevin William Vann: July 13, 2005
- Oscar Cantú: June 2, 2008
- Robert Barron: September 8, 2015
- Joseph Vincent Brennan: September 8, 2015
- David G. O'Connell: September 8, 2015
- Marc Vincent Trudeau: June 7, 2018
- Alejandro D. Aclan: May 16, 2019
- Albert Bahhuth: September 26, 2023
- Matthew Elshoff: September 26, 2023
- Brian Nunes: September 26, 2023
- Slawomir Szkredka: September 26, 2023

José Horacio Gómez Velasco (born December 26, 1951) is a Mexican American Catholic prelate serving as the fifth Archbishop of Los Angeles in California since 2011. He previously served as auxiliary bishop of the Archdiocese of Denver in Colorado from 2001 to 2004 and as Archbishop of San Antonio in Texas from 2004 to 2010.

Gómez was vice president of the United States Conference of Catholic Bishops (USCCB) from November 15, 2016, until his election as president on November 12, 2019. He was the first person of Hispanic descent to hold each of those positions. His three-year presidential term ended on November 15, 2022, with the election of Archbishop Timothy Broglio.

== Early life and education ==
José Horacio Gómez Velasco was born on December 26, 1951, in Monterrey, Mexico, to José H. Gómez and Esperanza Velasco. He has three older sisters and one younger sister. He attended the Monterrey Institute of Technology in Monterrey before entering the National University of Mexico in Mexico City, where he earned undergraduate degrees in accounting and philosophy. While attending college, Gómez joined Opus Dei, an institution founded by St. Josemaría Escrivá in 1928.

From 1975 to 1980, Gómez studied at the University of Navarre in Pamplona, Spain, earning his Bachelor of Theology degree and Licentiate of Theology.

== Priesthood ==
On August 15, 1978, Gómez was ordained a priest of Opus Dei by Cardinal Franz König at the Shrine of Torreciudad in Aragon, Spain. In 1980, Gómez obtained a Doctor of Sacred Theology degree from the University of Navarre. After his ordination, Opus Dei assigned him to pastoral work with college and high school students in Spain and Mexico.

In 1987, Opus Dei sent Gómez to serve as a priest in residence at Our Lady of Grace Parish in San Antonio, Texas. During this period, he also helped in the Diocese of Galveston-Houston in Katy, Texas. Gómez became a naturalized American citizen in 1995.

In 1991, Gómez became a regional representative of the National Association of Hispanic Priests. He became its president in 1995 and served as executive director from 1999 to 2001. In 2003, he earned its "El Buen Pastor " award. From 1997 to 1998, Gómez served as a member-at-large on the board of directors for the National Catholic Council of Hispanic Ministry, and was elected as its treasurer in 1999. From 1998 to 2000, Gómez served on the steering committee for Encuentro 2000, a national celebration organized by the USCCB for the Great Jubilee in 2000.

Along with Cardinal Norberto Rivera, Gómez played a key role in the establishment in August 2000 of the Hispanic Seminary of Saint Mary of Guadalupe in Mexico City. It was set up to train seminarians for service in Hispanic communities in the United States. He also spearheaded the establishment of Centro San Juan Diego, a center for the formation of lay leaders and a base to provide welcoming services to immigrants, in Denver, Colorado. In 1999, he became the vicar of Opus Dei for Texas.

== Episcopal Ministry ==
=== Auxiliary Bishop of Denver ===
On January 23, 2001, Pope John Paul II appointed Gómez as auxiliary bishop of Denver and titular bishop of Belali. He received his episcopal consecration on March 26, 2001, from Archbishop Charles J. Chaput, with Bishop Joseph Fiorenza and Bishop Javier Echevarría Rodríguez, former Vicar General and Prelate of Opus Dei, as co-consecrators. Gómez chose as his episcopal motto "Adeamus cum fiducia ad thronum gratiae", meaning "Let us confidently approach the throne of grace" (Hebrews 4:16).

Gómez was the first numerary member of Opus Dei to be consecrated a bishop in the United States. Once he became bishop, he could no longer be a member of Opus Dei as he was now directly under the pope's jurisdiction. Gómez in 2010 reiterated that he was not a member of Opus Dei, but someone who was ordained a priest in Opus Dei and whose spirituality reflected that background.

Gómez served as rector of the Cathedral of the Immaculate Conception in Denver from 2001 to 2003. He next served as both moderator of the curia for the archdiocese and pastor of Mother of God Church in Denver.

=== Archbishop of San Antonio ===
Gómez was appointed archbishop of San Antonio by John Paul II on December 29, 2004. In 2006, Gómez introduced the Catholic Community Foundation, a Catholic social service organization. In 2007, he helped bring together bishops and Hispanic community leaders from around the United States to create the Catholic Association of Latino Leaders (CALL).

During his tenure in San Antonio, Gómez earned a reputation as an orthodox leader who reversed some of the liberal initiatives in the diocese. He disbanded the chancery's Justice and Peace Commission after its members opposed his support of an amendment to the Constitution of Texas that banned same-sex marriage.

Gómez was a member of the Pontifical Commission for Latin America in the Roman Curia and a board member for the Catholic University of America in Washington, D.C. As a USCCB member, he was the chair of the Subcommittee for the Church in Latin America; in the latter capacity, he led a three-bishop delegation to Haiti to assess the situation there following its 2010 earthquake. As of 2025, Gómez is a member of the USCCB Committee on Migration, chair of the Task Force on the Spanish-language Bible, and a former member of the Committee on Doctrine.

=== Archbishop of Los Angeles ===
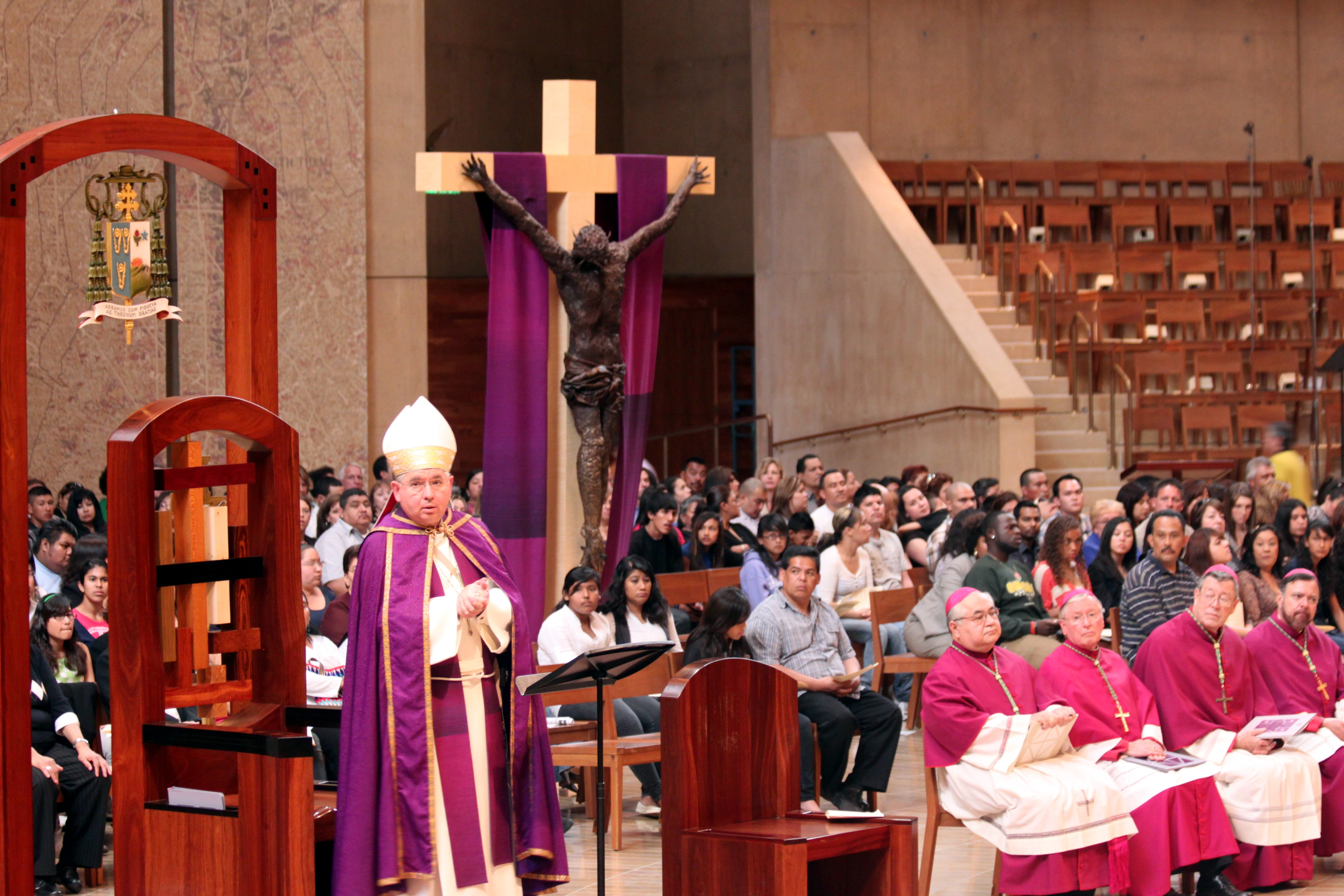
Gómez (left) in the Cathedral of Our Lady of the Angels, Los Angeles, California (2011)

On April 6, 2010, Gómez was appointed coadjutor archbishop of Los Angeles by Pope Benedict XVI. At that time, the archdiocese was the largest Catholic diocese in the nation, with Hispanics comprising over two-thirds of its five million Catholics. Gómez succeeded Cardinal Roger Mahony on March 1, 2011, with a transition ceremony held on February 27, 2011. He was the first Hispanic to serve as archbishop of Los Angeles, as well as the highest-ranking Hispanic bishop in the United States. Gómez said in April 2010:

I'm very grateful to the Holy Father for giving me this opportunity to serve the Church with a mentor and leader like Cardinal Roger Mahony. I'm grateful to the Apostolic Nuncio, Archbishop Pietro Sambi, for supporting the Holy Father's confidence in me. I will try with all my strength to earn that trust.

Considered theologically conservative, Gómez was described in a 2005 Time Magazine article as "a natural conciliator admired for uniting rich and poor and Anglo and Hispanic Catholics". He was regarded as more conservative than his predecessor, Cardinal Mahony. Gómez said that observers should not conclude that he was a conservative simply because he was a priest of Opus Dei. In September 2012, Benedict XVI appointed Gómez to serve as a synod father at the 13th Ordinary General Assembly of the Synod of Bishops on the New Evangelization in Rome in October 2012. In November 2012, Benedict XVI appointed him to the Pontifical Council for Social Communications in Rome In January 2013, Gómez stated that Mahony would "no longer have any administrative or public duties" for the Los Angeles Archdiocese. The announcement came as Gómez unveiled the archdiocese's files related to clergy sexual abuse. He said:

I find these files to be brutal and painful reading. The behavior described in these files is terribly sad and evil. There is no excuse, no explaining away what happened to these children. The priests involved had the duty to be their spiritual fathers and they failed. We need to acknowledge that terrible failure today.

With Gómez's blessing, the Queen of Angels Foundation in 2011 revived the custom of a Marian procession and Votive Mass in Los Angeles each September 4. This event was to commemorate the founding of the City of Los Angeles in 1781. In 2012, Gómez started serving as the principal celebrant of this annual Mass.

During the November 2014 USCCB meeting, the bishops elected Gómez as a delegate to the 2015 World Synod of Bishops on the Family in Rome, pending Vatican approval. In November 2016, he was elected USCCB vice-president and in November 2019 USCCB president. Gómez became the first Hispanic bishop to hold that post. In June 2022, Gómez announced that he was praying for Paul Pelosi, the businessman husband of House Speaker Nancy Pelosi, after he was brutally attacked by an intruder in their home in San Francisco.

In March 2023, Gómez presided at the funeral mass of Auxiliary Bishop David O’Connell at the Cathedral of Our Lady of the Angels. O'Connell was shot to death at his Hacienda Heights home by Carlos Medina, the husband of O'Connell's housekeeper.

Gómez, in June 2023, announced the celebration of a special Mass in Los Angeles to mark a day of prayer in reparation. This Mass was in response to the plan of the Los Angeles Dodgers professional baseball team to honor the Sisters of Perpetual Indulgence at an upcoming game. Gómez denounced the Sisters, an LGBTQ activist and satirical group, as blasphemers.

Gomez is the Grand Prior of the USA Western Lieutenancy of the Equestrian Order of the Holy Sepulchre of Jerusalem.

== Views and theology ==
=== Abortion ===
During the 2008 US presidential election, Gómez publicly expressed concern when St. Mary's University in San Antonio, Texas, allowed Senator Hillary Clinton, who supported abortion rights for women, to hold a campaign event on campus. Gómez in October 2008 stated on EWTN that abortion "is not a 'Catholic' issue. It is a matter of fundamental human rights" and that defending life "is an essential part of the Catholic faith". He lamented politicians who were publicly calling for liberalized abortion laws, suggesting that politicians, Catholics included, choose "very public platforms to make misleading statements about it". He specifically criticized Senator Joe Biden (himself a Catholic) for his past comments on abortion rights.

In 2009, Gómez criticized the University of Notre Dame for inviting US President Barack Obama as its commencement speaker due to his support of abortion rights for women.

Gómez wrote a statement to be released on January 20, 2021, the day of Biden's inauguration as US president. It warned that the incoming administration would advance "moral evils" on several fronts, including abortion, gender, and religious liberty. The Vatican Secretariat of State blocked Gómez's statement hours before its release. It was released several hours later after the Vatican released a communique from Pope Francis extending "cordial good wishes" to Biden.

Following the US Supreme Court 2022 ruling Dobbs v. Jackson Women's Health Organization, which overturned the 1973 Roe v. Wade decision on legalized abortion, Gomez issued a statement praising the ruling as USCCB president.

=== Euthanasia ===
In June 2015, Gómez sent a letter to the Health Committee of the California State Assembly to voice his objections to a vote on legislation that would permit adults with a terminal illness to seek medication from a doctor to end their lives. In it, Gómez urged the assembly representatives to reject legislation that "has dangerous implications for our state, especially the poor and the most vulnerable". He added that "helping someone die – even if that person is desperate and asks for the help – is still killing".

Gómez said in June 2020 that legalizing euthanasia "is the beginning of tyranny" in which "we are crossing a line – from being a society that cares for those who are aging and sick to a society that kills those whose suffering we can no longer tolerate". Gómez said that euthanasia was a moral failure that also invites ambiguities over how such policies may be practiced, believing that it would also worsen the inequalities in the healthcare system.

=== Immigration ===
In 2013, Gómez published Immigration and the Next America, connecting the rights of immigrants to the highest principles of the American tradition. Gómez in 2025, along with other American bishops, criticized President Donald Trump's executive orders to aggressively deport undocumented immigrants, along with his intention to end birthright citizenship. Gomez stated:

Statements and actions from the new administration in Washington have caused fear in our parishes, schools, and communities. That is not good for anybody. I pray that our leaders will proceed with restraint and compassion, with respect for the law, and with respect for the rights and dignity of all concerned.

=== Ordination of women ===
Gómez voiced concerns in 2010 when Our Lady of the Lake University in San Antonio allowed a high-profile nun who some claim supports female ordination to be a keynote speaker at an event.

=== Racism ===
In 2020, Gómez issued a statement on behalf of the USCCB in which he condemned the murder of George Floyd by police in Minneapolis, Minnesota, as "senseless and brutal". He said that the protests following Floyd's murder reflected "the justified frustration and anger of millions", taking the opportunity to condemn the "humiliation, indignity, and unequal opportunity" based on race. Gómez called for greater tolerance and the removal of racism from all aspects of the community to foster greater harmony.

=== Same-sex marriage ===
In 2011, Gómez warned that the legalization of same-sex marriage in the United States was a threat to religious liberty. He complained about Catholic adoption agencies being forced to stop operation because they refused to place children with same-sex couples.

=== Tridentine Mass ===
Gómez welcomed the 2007 publication of the apostolic letter Summorum Pontificum by Pope Benedict XVI. It granted wider usage of the Tridentine Mass, which Gómez said would preserve "the rich heritage and legacy of the Church".

== Publications ==
- Men of Brave Heart: The Virtue of Courage in the Priestly Life (Our Sunday Visitor, 2009)
- A Will to Live: Clear Answers on End of Life Issues (Basilica, 2008).

== Honors ==
- One of the most notable Hispanics in America (2007) CNN
- Named one of the 25 most influential Hispanics in the United States (2005), Time Magazine
- Doctorate of Christian Letters (2013) from Franciscan University of Steubenville, Steubenville, Ohio
- Doctor of Humane Letters (2018) from Loyola Marymount University, Los Angeles
- Doctor of Fine Arts, honoris causa (2018) from Catholic University of America, Washington, D.C.

== See also ==
- Catholic Church hierarchy
- Catholic Church in the United States
- Historical list of the Catholic bishops of the United States
- List of Catholic bishops of the United States
- Lists of patriarchs, archbishops, and bishops

== Sources ==
- "Most Reverend José H. Gómez, S.T.D." Retrieved June 4, 2010
- "Excelentísimo Monseñor José H. Gómez, S.T.D." Retrieved June 4, 2010 (in Spanish)
- Fox News – Dispute with Nuns Over Convent is far from Over July 30, 2015

Catholic Church titles
Preceded by Roger Mahony	Archbishop of Los Angeles; 2011–Present	Incumbent
Preceded by Daniel DiNardo	President of the USCCB; 2019–2022	Succeeded by Timothy Broglio
Preceded by Patrick Flores	Archbishop of San Antonio; 2004–2010	Succeeded by Gustavo García-Siller
Preceded by Heinrich von Soden-Fraunhofen	— TITULAR — Bishop of Belali; 2001–2004	Succeeded by Carlos Alberto de Pinho Moreira Azevedo
