= Assumption Seminary =

- Saint John's Seminary
- U.S. National Register of Historic Places
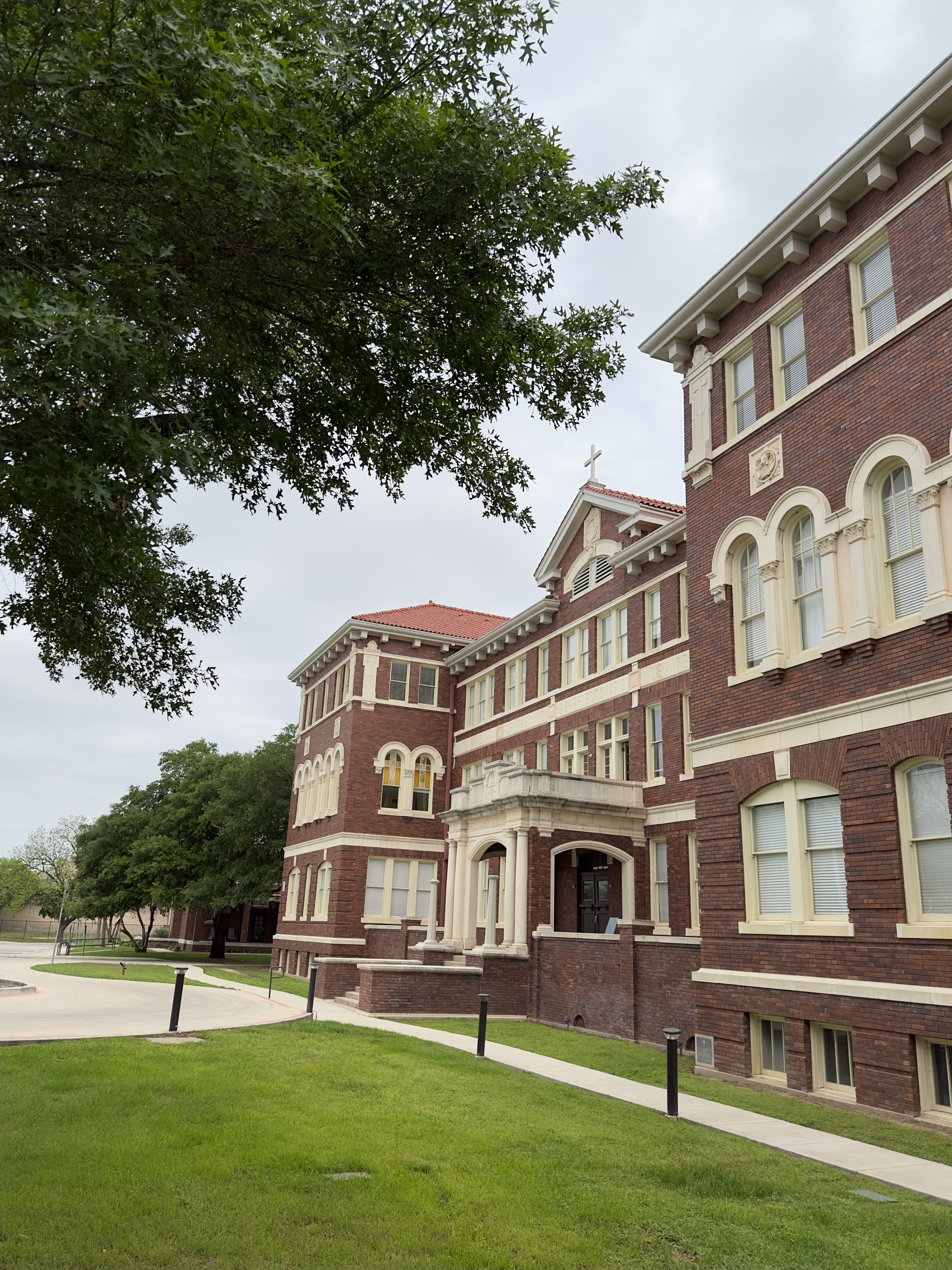

- Location within Texas Location within the United States
- Location: 2600 W Woodlawn Ave; San Antonio, Texas; United States
- Coordinates: 29.391520°N 98.490736°W
- Area: less than one acre
- Built: 1920
- NRHP reference No.: 100002470
- Added to NRHP: May 23, 2018

Assumption Seminary in San Antonio, Texas, was established in 1915 to train the Catholic priests of the region to carry out their service to the people.

== History ==
After its establishment in 1874, the Diocese of San Antonio needed to find a system for training clergy to care for its people, sending them on a temporary basis to various institutions in the region over the next quarter-century. With no seminary in the diocese, in 1902 these seminarian were sent to the newly opened San Antonio Philosophical and Theological Seminary (now the Oblate School of Theology). In 1915, faced with a severe shortage of priests and a booming Catholic population due to refugees from the Mexican Revolution, John W. Shaw, the Bishop of San Antonio, decided to open a seminary in his own residence, teaching university level studies. As early as 1911, he had declared that: “I have laid down a rule that for the future no student will be ordained until such time as he can speak Spanish fluently.”

Five years later, the school was given the name of St. John's Seminary and was relocated to a site adjacent to Immaculate Conception Mission in the same city. In 1928, two years after the diocese was elevated to the status of an archdiocese, a theology department was added. By that time, priests of the archdiocese formed the core of the faculty of the seminary.

Around 1940, the then-Archbishop of Oklahoma City, Robert E. Lucey, placed the Congregation of the Mission (better known as the Vincentian Fathers) in charge of the seminary. During World War II, he purchased the former Presbyterian-affiliated Trinity University facility on Woodlawn Avenue. At the dedication ceremony for the new location in 1952, the school was given the new name of Assumption Seminary. In 1967 archdiocesan clergy once again assumed responsibility for the administration of the school. The Mission Road facility was closed, and theology students began taking academic courses at the Oblate School of Theology in 1969. To prepare students for ministry to the Hispanic population of the country, the Mexican American Cultural Center was opened on the Woodlawn Avenue campus in 1972.

== Current status ==
Today alumni from Arizona, California, Colorado, Louisiana, Virginia, Michigan, Nevada, North Carolina and Texas, as well as El Salvador, serve the Catholic populations of their dioceses. Twelve Catholic bishops have been among the alumni of the school.
