= Archdiocese of San Antonio =

Catholic archdiocese in Texas, United States

Coordinates: 29.4246°N 98.4942°W

Archdiocese of San Antonio Archidioecesis Sancti Antonii Arquidiócesis de San Antonio

Catholic
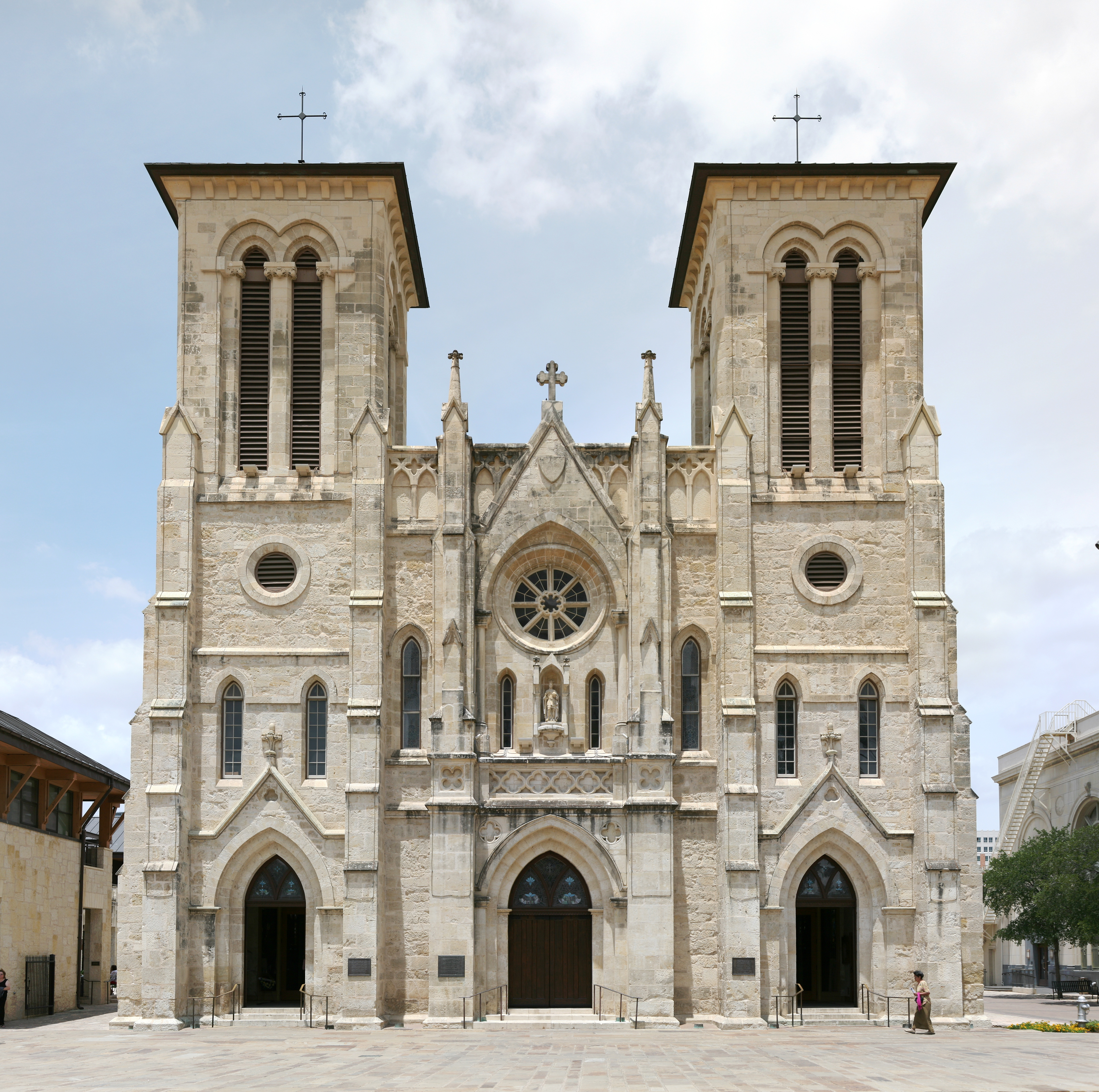
- San Fernando Cathedral

- Coat of arms

Location
- Country: United States
- Territory: City of San Antonio and the Texas counties of Val Verde, Real, Edwards, Kerr, Gillespie, Kendall, Comal, Guadalupe, Gonzales, Uvalde, Kinney, Medina, Bexar, Wilson, Karnes, Frio, Atascosa, and McMullen
- Episcopal conference: United States Conference of Catholic Bishops
- Ecclesiastical region: Region X
- Ecclesiastical province: Province of San Antonio

Statistics
- Area: 27,841 sq mi (72,110 km^{2})
- Population: Total; Catholics: (as of 2023); ▲2,798,718; ▲1,160,000 ( 41.4%)
- Parishes: ▲170 (2023)

Information
- Denomination: Catholic
- Sui iuris church: Latin Church
- Rite: Roman Rite
- Established: August 28, 1874 (151 years ago)
- Cathedral: San Fernando Cathedral
- Patron saint: Saint Anthony of Padua
- Secular priests: ▼144, plus 70 religious priests and 250 permanent deacons (2023)

Current leadership
- Pope: Leo XIV
- Archbishop: Gustavo García-Siller
- Auxiliary Bishops: Gary W. Janak; Jose Arturo Cepeda
- Judicial Vicar: Krikor G. Chahin
- Bishops emeritus: Michael J. Boulette

Map
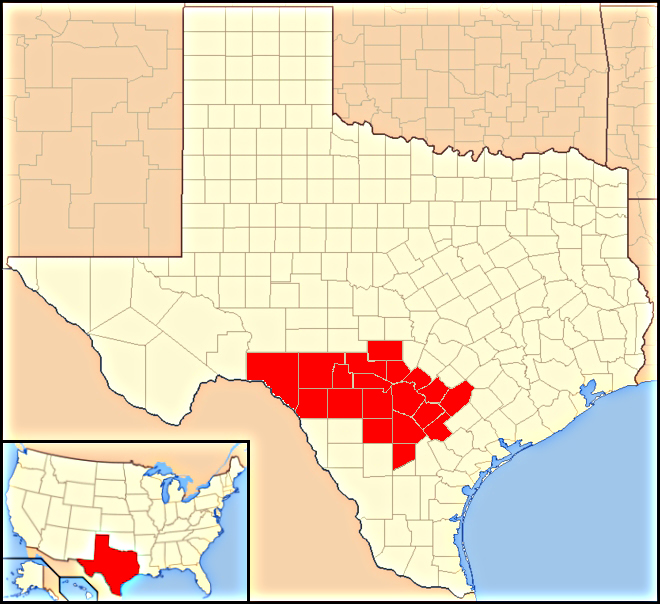

Website
- www.archsa.org

The Archdiocese of San Antonio (Latin: Archidioecesis Sancti Antonii) is an archdiocese of the Catholic Church in the United States. It encompasses 27,841 square miles (72,110 km^{2}) in the U.S. state of Texas. Its population was 1,148,253 in 2025. The archdiocese includes the city of San Antonio and the following counties: Val Verde, Edwards, Real, Kerr, Gillespie, Kendall, Comal, Guadalupe, Gonzales, Uvalde, Kinney, Medina, Bexar, Wilson, Karnes, Frio, Atascosa, and Bandera, and the portion of McMullen County north of the Nueces River.

On August 28, 1874, the Diocese of Galveston was divided, and the northern territory was canonically erected by the Holy See as the Diocese of San Antonio. Originally part of the ecclesiastical province of New Orleans, it was subsequently elevated on August 3, 1926, to a metropolitan archdiocese.

The archbishop of San Antonio also serves as the metropolitan of the Ecclesiastical Province of San Antonio, overseeing the following suffragan dioceses: Amarillo, Dallas, El Paso, Fort Worth, Laredo, Lubbock, and San Angelo. All of Texas' dioceses had been suffragan sees under San Antonio until December 2004, when Pope John Paul II created the new Ecclesiastical Province of Galveston-Houston and elevated the Archdiocese of Galveston-Houston to a metropolitan see.

== History ==
The Archdiocese of San Antonio was erected as a diocese on August 28, 1874, consisting of territory taken from the then-Diocese of Galveston. It was elevated to an archdiocese on August 3, 1926.

In 2010, it had 138 parishes, 34 missions and two pastoral centers. In 2018, it reported 139 parishes, 5 hospitals, 3 health care centers, 3 orphanages, 16 nurseries, 10 high schools, and 30 elementary schools.

With the appointment of Archbishop José Horacio Gómez as the Coadjutor Archbishop of Los Angeles, its cathedral was considered sede vacante until October 14, 2010. On October 14, 2010, Pope Benedict XVI appointed Gustavo Garcia-Siller as archbishop of the Archdiocese of San Antonio.

On January 31, 2019, the archdiocese released a list of 56 Catholic clergy who were "credibly accused" of committing acts of sex abuse as early as 1940. In January 2026, The Bexar County district attorney's office dismissed the sexual assault case against San Antonio priest George Ndungu, who was arrested in September 2023 after allegedly sexual assaulting a church employee and parishioner.

== Coat of arms ==
Coat of arms of Archdiocese of San Antonio
Escutcheon Azure, on a cross quadrate in the centre argent a Tau-cross of the first; in dexter chief a star of the second Symbolism The Tau cross is chosen in resemblance to the crutches that St. Anthony would use. The star represents Texas, the Lone Star State.

== Bishops ==
=== Bishops of San Antonio ===
1. Anthony Dominic Ambrose Pellicer (1874–1880)
2. John Claude Neraz (1881–1894)
3. John Anthony Forest (1895–1911)
4. John William Shaw (1911–1918; coadjutor bishop 1910–1911), appointed Archbishop of New Orleans
5. Arthur Jerome Drossaerts (1918–1926), elevated to Archbishop

=== Archbishops of San Antonio ===
1. Arthur Jerome Drossaerts (1926–1940)
2. Robert Emmet Lucey (1941–1969)
3. Francis James Furey (1969–1979)
4. Patrick Fernández Flores (1979–2004)
5. Jose Horacio Gómez Velasco (2004–2010), appointed Coadjutor archbishop and later Archbishop of Los Angeles
6. Gustavo Garcia-Siller, M.Sp.S. (2010–present)

=== Auxiliary Bishops ===
- Stephen Aloysius Leven (1955–1969), appointed Bishop of San Angelo
- Patrick Fernández Flores (1970–1978), appointed Bishop of El Paso and later Archbishop of San Antonio
- Hugo Mark Gerbermann, M.M. (1975–1982)
- Raymundo Joseph Peña (1976–1980), appointed Bishop of El Paso and later Bishop of Brownsville
- Charles Victor Grahmann (1981–1982), appointed Bishop of Victoria and later Bishop of Dallas
- Ricardo Ramirez, C.S.B. (1981–1982), appointed Bishop of Las Cruces
- Bernard Ferdinand Popp (1983–1993)
- Edmond Carmody (1988–1992), appointed Bishop of Tyler and later Bishop of Corpus Christi
- Joseph Anthony Galante (1992–1994), appointed Bishop of Beaumont and later Coadjutor Bishop of Dallas and Bishop of Camden
- John Yanta (1994–1997), appointed Bishop of Amarillo
- Thomas Flanagan (1998–2005)
- Patrick Zurek (1998–2008), appointed Bishop of Amarillo
- Oscar Cantú (2008–2013), appointed Bishop of Las Cruces
- Michael Joseph Boulette (2017–2025)
- Gary W. Janak (2021–present)
- José Arturo Cepeda Escobedo (2025–present)

=== Other diocesan priests who became bishops ===
- Mariano Simon Garriga, appointed coadjutor bishop in 1936 and later Bishop of Corpus Christi
- Sidney Matthew Metzger, appointed Auxiliary Bishop of Santa Fe in 1939 and later Coadjutor Bishop and Bishop of El Paso
- Laurence Julius FitzSimon, appointed Bishop of Amarillo in 1941
- John Louis Morkovsky, appointed Auxiliary Bishop of Amarillo in 1955, later Bishop of Amarillo, Coadjutor Bishop of Galveston-Houston, and Bishop of Galveston-Houston
- Charles Edwin Herzig, appointed Bishop of Tyler in 1986
- Gerald Richard Barnes, appointed Auxiliary Bishop in 1992 and later Bishop of San Bernardino
- José Arturo Cepeda Escobedo, appointed Auxiliary Bishop of Detroit in 2011 and later Auxiliary Bishop of San Antonio

== Education ==
=== Universities ===
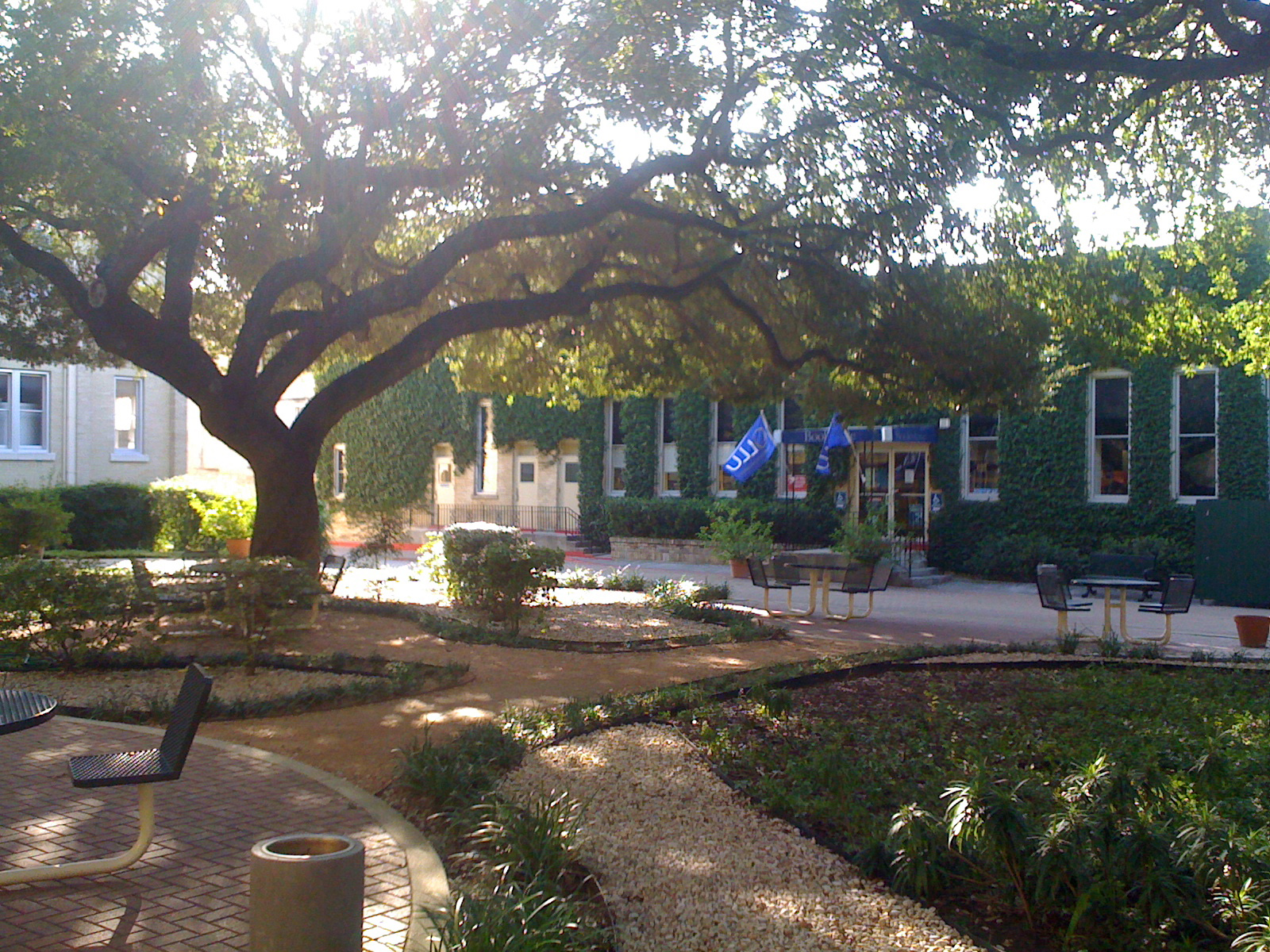
Our Lady of the Lake University, San Antonio, Texas (2009)

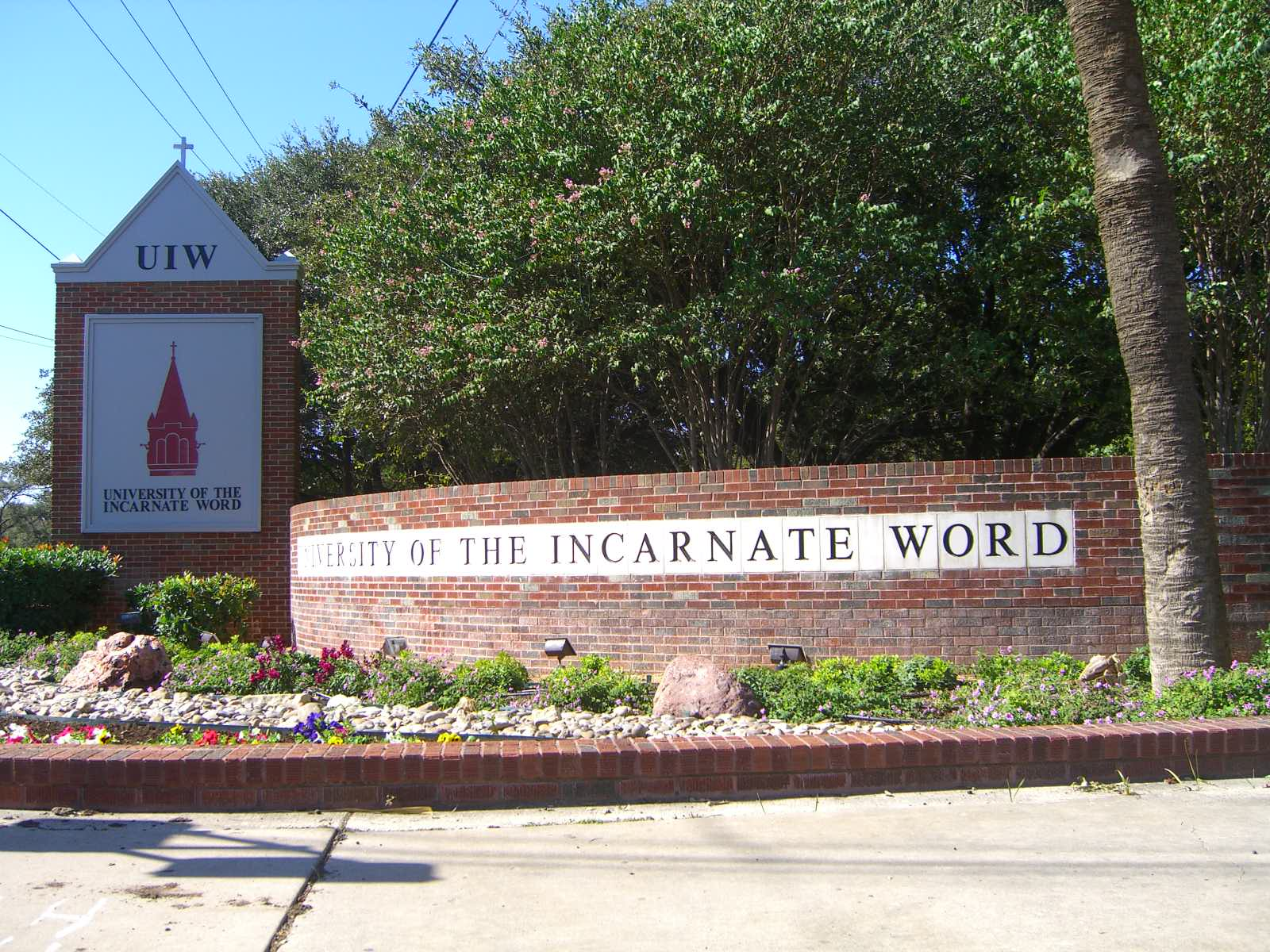
University of the Incarnate Word, San Antonio, Texas (2006)

- Our Lady of the Lake University – San Antonio
- St. Mary's University – San Antonio
- University of the Incarnate Word – San Antonio

=== High schools ===
- Antonian College Preparatory High School – Castle Hills (1964)
- Central Catholic Marianist High School – San Antonio (1852)
- Holy Cross of San Antonio – San Antonio (1957)
- Incarnate Word High School – San Antonio (1881)
- John Paul II Catholic High School – Schertz (2009)
- Our Lady of the Hills High School – Kerrville (2002)
- Providence High School – San Antonio (1951)
- St. Anthony Catholic High School – San Antonio (1905)

=== Former high schools ===
- St. Francis Academy – San Antonio (1960 – 2002)
- St. Gerard Catholic High School – San Antonio (1927 – 2022)
- St. Mary's School Riverwalk – San Antonio (1910 – 2004)

== Province of San Antonio ==
See List of Catholic bishops in the Province of San Antonio
