= Oblate School of Theology =

Catholic graduate school in San Antonio, Texas, U.S.

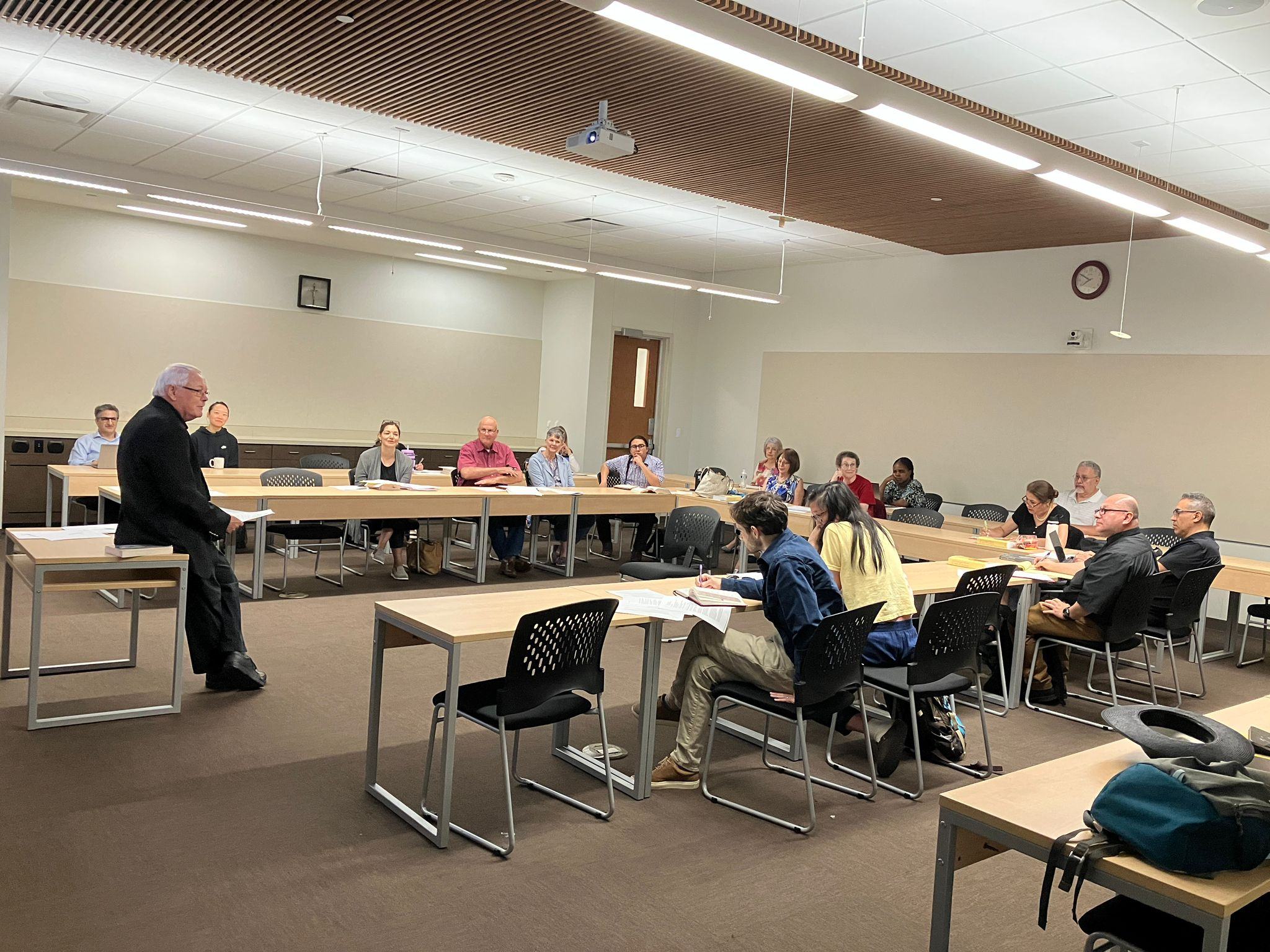
- Rolheiser teaches a survey course entitled "Contemporary Spirituality" at Oblate School of Theology
- Motto: Preach the Gospel to the most abandoned
- Established: 1903
- Religious affiliation: Catholic Church (Missionary Oblates of Mary Immaculate)
- President: Louis Studer
- Dean: Susan Pontz
- Postgraduates: 179
- Doctoral students: 24
- Location: 285 Oblate Dr., San Antonio, Texas, United States; 29.505959°N 98.503128°W
- Language: English
- Website: ost.edu

Oblate School of Theology is a Catholic graduate school for theological studies and spirituality in San Antonio, Texas. It was founded in 1903 by the Missionary Oblates of Mary Immaculate. Louis Studer, OMI, has served as its president since July 2024.

Oblate is home to three institutes: the Sankofa Institute for African American Pastoral Leadership, the Pastoral Formation Institute, and the Institute for the Study of Contemporary Spirituality. The school offers the only fully-funded, ATS-accredited PhD in Christian Spirituality in the United States, founded by Ronald Rolheiser.

== Campus ==
Oblate School of Theology has a 41-acre campus amidst groves of trees in the Shearer Hills neighborhood of San Antonio. The Whitley Theological Center, Oblate Renewal Center, Immaculate Conception Memorial Chapel, O'Shaughnessy Library, Pat Guidon Center, Lourdes Grotto & Guadalupe Tepeyac, Benson Theological Center, Southwestern Oblate Historical Archives, Labyrinth of the Little Flower, and the Last Supper are all found on the campus.

== Notable faculty ==
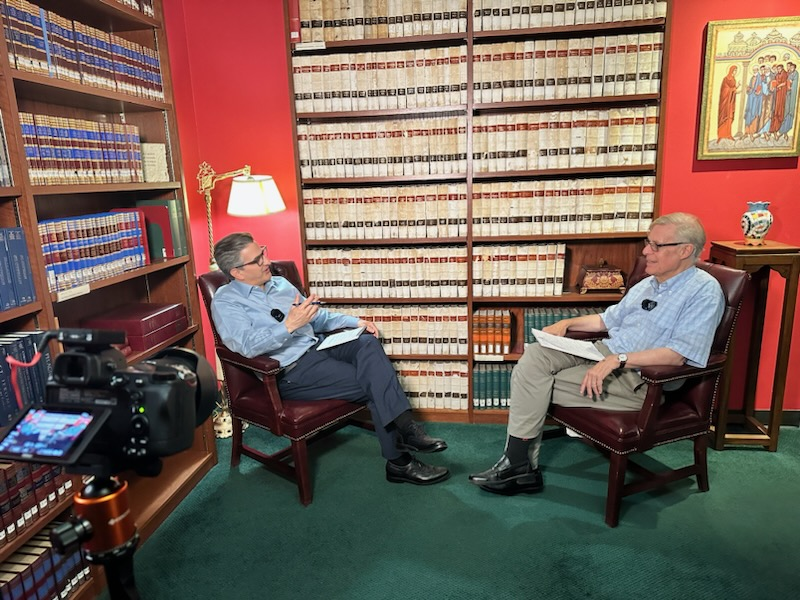
Philip Sheldrake being interviewed by David Pocta

- Ronald Rolheiser, author of The Holy Longing and The Shattered Lantern
- Philip Sheldrake, scholar in the multi-disciplinary field of spirituality

== Notable alumni ==
- Stephen Jay Berg (M.Div., 1999), Bishop of Pueblo
