= Guadalupe Huerta =

American activist (1920–2000)

- Born: October 5, 1920; Glendale, Arizona, U.S.
- Died: January 14, 2000 (aged 79); Phoenix, Arizona, U.S.
- Occupations: Lobbyist and activist
- Spouse: Joseph Huerta
- Children: Marta
- Writing career
- Years active: 1981 to 1993

Guadalupe Huerta (born Guadalupe Verdugo on October 5, 1920 – January 14, 2000) was a Hispanic activist and lobbyist. She worked as an Arizona lobbyist for the elderly in Washington during the Clinton administration. She is also responsible for providing government housing for seniors and people with disabilities. She received numerous community service awards, including the Jefferson Award for Public Service, and the Hon Kachina Award.

== Early life and career ==
She was born Guadalupe Verdugo, in Glendale, Arizona. Her mother was born into the Mesa family of Glendale. The Mesa family was matriarchal family, and Guadalupe's grandmother owned a great deal of real estate in Glendale, Arizona. Her grandmother lived in one of the historic Victorian houses near the center of town.

"The house was full of life with all the children. Music from the baby grand piano could be heard coming from the parlor. We as children used to run through the vineyards eating grapes that surrounded the house"

Guadalupe Huerta's father worked hard to support his family until his death in the early 1930s. This left the raising and financial support of all four children to Guadalupe's mother. While life suddenly became difficult for the family, her mother always made sure the children were well cared for which always extended to other people in need.

During the Depression, families from the Dustbowl were saved from starvation by Guadalupe's mother. Many poor families struggling in the Dustbowl would come to live for a short time until they could get back on their feet and moved on. This open-door policy and helping others in need was a policy that shape a part of the character of Guadalupe Huerta.

Guadalupe Huerta began working during WWII in the 1940s serving her country at Luke's Airforce base as a mechanic on the fuselages of airplanes However, when the war ended, so did the jobs for many women. Women working in men's former roles were told they were invaluable to America during the war; however, once the men returned home they were told they were no longer needed. This was a huge blow to Guadalupe Huerta but used all these experiences and would apply them in the future.

== Political Career 1981-1993 ==
State of Arizona House of Representatives Forty-fourth Legislature Second Regular Session 2000

Introduced by Representatives Loredo, Avelar, Horton, Cardamone, Valadez, Gonzales, Senators Lopez, Aguirre: Representatives Allen, Anderson, Binder, Brimhall, Brotherton, Carpenter, Carruthers, Daniels, Dunbar, Foster, Gardner M, Gardner W, Gerard, Gordon, Gray, Griffin, Hart, Hatch-Miller, Horne, Huffman, Knaperek, Kyle, Landrum, Laughter, Leff, Maiorana, Marsh, May, McGibbon, McLendon, Nichols, Norris, Pickens, Preble, Rios, Schottel, Verkamp, Voss, Weason, Weiers, Wong, Senators Cummiskey, Cunningham, Guenther, Hartley, Jackson, Mitchell, Richardson, Rios P, Solomon, Soltero

"..Over the years, she worked to better the lives of individuals in the Mexican American community and was a tireless advocate on behalf of elderly, poor and disabled individuals.

Guadalupe Huerta was one of the first people to be elected to the board of Chicanos Por La Causa, a Hispanic advocacy group, and was re-elected to this position numerous times. She ably served in this capacity from 1978 to 1993, when she was made a lifelong honorary member after her failing health forced her to retire.

Among her other accomplishments, Guadalupe Huerta was instrumental in the establishment of Casa De Primavera, a Phoenix apartment complex built for aging and disabled residents in the 1970s. She also gave freely of her time, energy and abilities as a member of the El Rinconcito Senior Center Advisory Board and the Braun Sacred Heart Advisory Board. An active member of the Sacred Heart Church, Guadalupe Huerta worked diligently to save the old Sacred Heart Church building in south Phoenix when the area was being razed for commercial development.

After fighting to ensure that the area's residents received fair value for their homes, she successfully undertook to save the church, which subsequently became a meeting place for the community's former residents.

In recognition of her efforts, Guadalupe Huerta received numerous community service awards, including the Hon Kachina Award, the Jefferson Award from Channel 12 television, and the Community Service Award from Chicanos Por La Causa. In addition, the Guadalupe Huerta Apartments were named for her exceptional efforts on behalf of the elderly. Guadalupe Huerta will be greatly missed by her family, many friends and the citizens of Phoenix.

Therefore, Be it resolved by the House of Representatives of the State of Arizona, the Senate concurring:

That the Members of the Legislature express sincere regret at the passing of Guadalupe Huerta and extend their sympathies and condolences to her daughter, Martha..(Marta), her granddaughters, Adelita and Margarita, her sisters, Rosario and Edwarda, and her nieces and nephews. "

HCR 2039 A CONCURRENT RESOLUTION

== Honors and awards ==
Jefferson Award/ Jacqueline Kennedy Onassis Award for Outstanding Public Service Benefiting Local Communities 1981, Hon Kachina Award 1983, Spirit of Arizona Award Arizona State Senate 1986, Community Service Award Chicanos Por La Causa,

Arizona Latina Trail Blazers 2013 and
Arizona Women's Hall of Fame 2019.
