= Apache Christ =

1989 painting by Robert Lentz

- Bik’egu'indán (Apache languages)
- Artist: Robert Lentz
- Year: 1989
- Medium: Oil on canvas
- Subject: Jesus Christ
- Dimensions: 2.4 m × 1.2 m (8 ft × 4 ft)
- Location: Mescalero, New Mexico, U.S.
- Owner: St. Joseph Apache Mission Church

Apache Christ (Apache: Bik’egu'indán) is a painting depicting Jesus as a Mescalero holy man. Created in 1989 by American Franciscan friar Robert Lentz, the 8-foot (2.4 m) icon is displayed in the altar of the St. Joseph Apache Mission Church, a Catholic church in the U.S. state of New Mexico with parishioners who are mostly Mescalero Apache. In the painting, Jesus is depicted atop Sierra Blanca, a New Mexico mountain range, greeting the rising sun after performing a sacred puberty ritual.

Lentz, who is known for his iconography depicting Jesus in different cultural contexts, painted Apache Christ in 1989 following a conversation with the church's pastor. He met with Mescalero Apache leaders and consulted with Apache medicine men for cultural guidance. In preparation for the artwork, he studied Apache rituals and gathered sacred spring water from the summit of Sierra Blanca to use in the mixing of his paints.

In 2024, a priest from St. Joseph removed Apache Christ and other sacred Mescalero art objects from display due to his view that they were pagan imagery. The removal outraged many of the church's parishioners. The painting was soon reinstalled and the priest was replaced.

== Background ==
The St. Joseph Apache Mission Church was built in Mescalero, New Mexico, in the early 20th century on the site of a prehistoric ruin of the Jornada Mogollon culture. Located within the Mescalero Apache Reservation, the church administers to the Chiricahua and Mescalero Apache people. During the construction of the church in 1920, traditional and sacred Apache spiritual items were placed beneath the cornerstone. Albert Braun, a Roman Catholic priest who helped to construct the church, respected the traditions of the Mescalero Apache ministry and did not interfere with their culture.

Artist Robert Lentz studied icon painting under Photis Kontoglou around 1977 at the Holy Transfiguration Monastery in Brookline, Massachusetts. He became a Franciscan friar and created icons depicting Jesus in different cultural contexts, as well as several gay-themed artworks with controversial backstories.

== Conception and execution ==
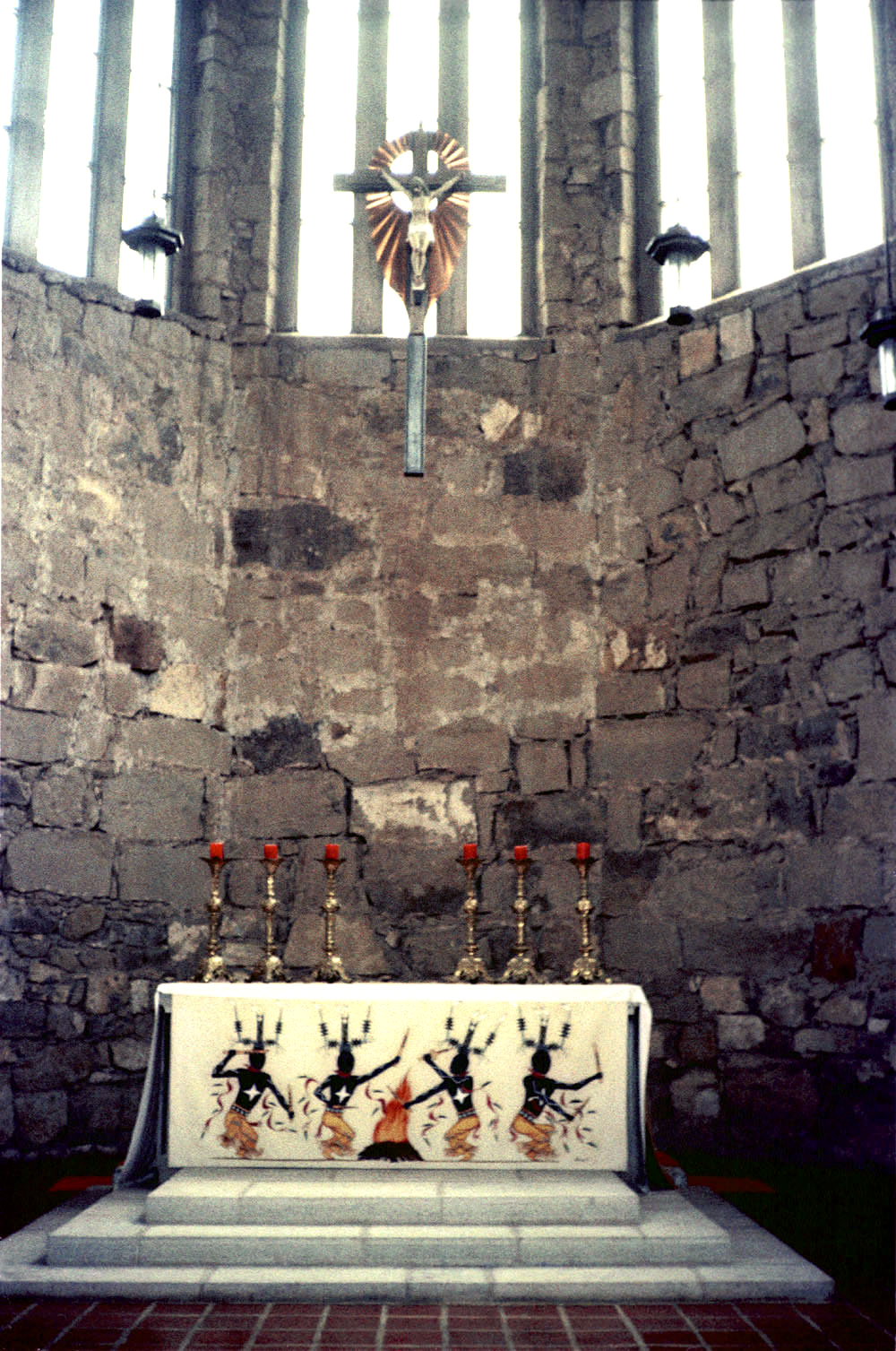
The altar of the St. Joseph Apache Mission Church in 1975, before the creation of the painting

In 1989, Lentz travelled to Mescalero, New Mexico, to visit St. Joseph. He discussed the possibility of creating a painting for the church with Father Larry Gosselin, a fellow Franciscan who was the church's pastor at the time. Gosselin asked for approval from 15 Mescalero Apache leaders and arranged for Lentz to meet with Apache medicine men for cultural guidance. Initially the medicine men did not approve of the project, but later acquiesced, recommending that Lentz not use anyone from Mescalero as a model for the work.

In preparation for creating the painting, Lentz familiarized himself with Apache rituals and made a pilgrimage to the summit of Sierra Blanca where he gathered water from the sacred springs to use for mixing his paint. According to Gosselin, Lentz "poured all of himself into that painting", sprinkling himself with gold dust and forgoing showering so his body oils would help to adhere the gold onto the canvas. He took three months to finish the painting. According to Lentz, the intention of the painting is to show "that people could be Apache and Catholic, and both completely".

Lentz gave Apache Christ to the Mescalero people. When he brought the finished painting to show to Father Gosselin, a nun named Juanita was conversing with some visiting women. As the painting was unveiled, there was a three-minute silence. Sister Juanita later said that they had been in silent awe. Apache Christ was installed on the wall behind the stone chapel's altar in 1990. It received a blessing from Father Gosselin during mass. The mass was paused midway through to allow the painting to receive a traditional blessing with cattail pollen from Mescalero medicine men.

== Description ==
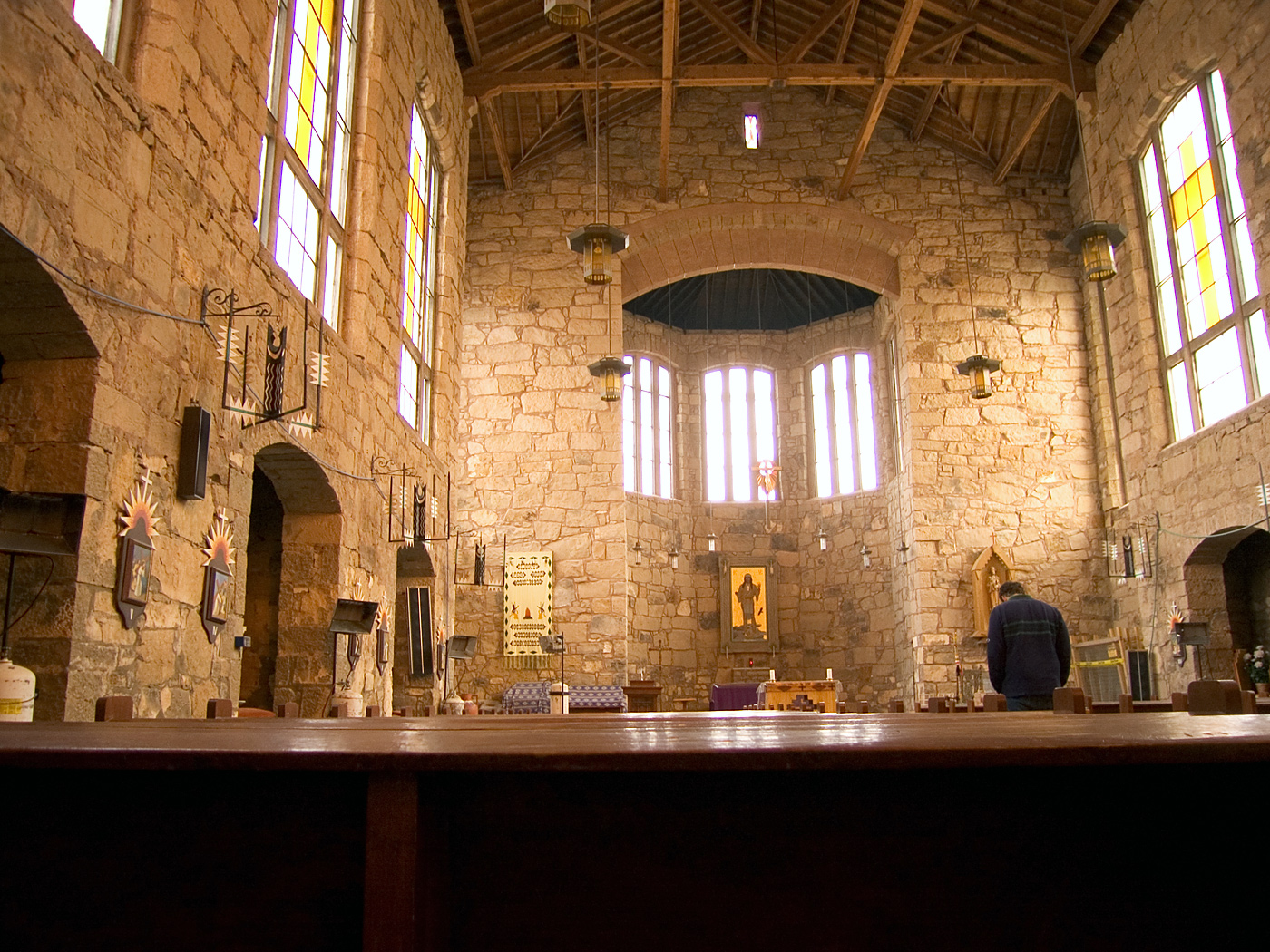
Interior of the St. Joseph Apache Mission Church

Apache Christ serves as the centerpiece of the St. Joseph Apache Mission Church, representing a blending of Christian rites and sacred Apache ceremonies. The icon painting depicts Jesus as a Mescalero Apache medicine man standing on the summit of Sierra Blanca at dawn. In the 8 ft (2.4 m) tall painting, he is dressed traditionally, wearing moccasins, a breech cloth, and a warrior shirt. His left hand is raised, the outward-facing palm bearing a sun symbol, while his right hand holds a deer hoof rattle. Before his feet is a basket containing sacred objects, including a grass brush, bags of tobacco, cattail pollen, and an eagle feather. An eagle flying in the background represents the Holy Spirit. Greek Christograms representing Jesus Christ are depicted in the halo and in the upper corners of the painting. The Apache words Bik’egu'indán ('Giver of Life', one of the Apache names for the Creator) are inscribed on the lower border of the painting. An elaborate frame for the icon was hand-crafted by Roberto Lavadie, a wood sculptor based in New Mexico.

In the painting, Jesus is represented greeting the dawn on the fourth morning of the traditional puberty rites for young women who have come of age. The deer hoof rattle he holds is used ceremonially during Mescalero puberty rituals. During Christmas, a tepee and nativity scene are erected in the church near the painting. The baby Jesus, strapped to a cradleboard, is carried to the altar by Mescalero girls who have recently gone through the ceremonial puberty rites.

Versions of the Apache Christ icon have been displayed in other Native churches, including a Pima church in Mexico, an Episcopal church in Salt Lake City, Utah, St. Peter's Chapel at the National Shrine of Saint Kateri Tekakwitha, and in the altar of the former ANAWIM church in Chicago.

== 2024 removal and restoration ==
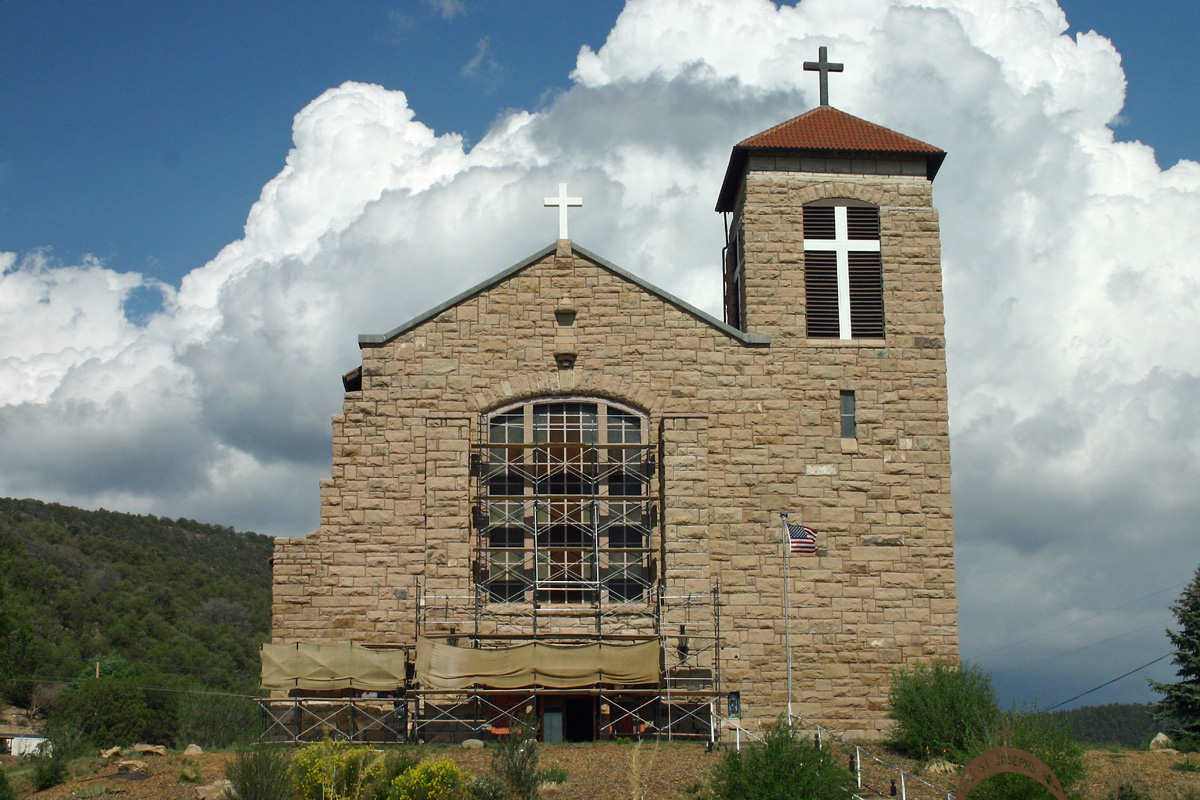
Exterior of the St. Joseph Apache Mission Church

Security footage from inside the church shows that on June 26, 2024, Fr. Chudy and other men removed the Apache Christ icon from display, having deemed it pagan imagery contradictory to Catholicism. Also removed were baskets and ceramic chalices which were used during the Eucharist and had been gifts from the Pueblo community, as well as a painting of a sacred Indigenous dancer by Mescalero artist Gervase Peso. The icon's wooden frame was disassembled and locked in a storage area only accessible by the diocese of Las Cruces. The removal of the art occurred under the approval of Bishop Peter Baldacchino. A diocesan risk manager and other men associated with a spiritual warfare prayer group were present for the removal.

Parishioners initially believed that the art had been stolen. Lentz compared the removal of the icon to a 19th-century ambush of an Indian village by a posse of white men. He wrote that he had given the painting to the Mescalero people and that men from a conservative Catholic organization in a military town 30 miles from Mescalero had been responsible for the removal. He continued:

Roman Catholic clergy have long been known for their arrogance. It is no mystery that so many have perished during upheavals and revolutions in Catholic countries. As I watch the present scandal unfold, I am reminded of the old expression, "And Jesus wept."
Shame on this priest. Shame on the white men who sneaked with him onto the reservation that night. Shame on the bishop who is conveniently away from his flock—unavailable, even in this age of instant communication!

After the incident gained widespread media attention, the diocese returned the art, which was reinstalled. Bishop Baldacchino replaced the priest with another and met with the parish council. A member of the parish council indicated Baldacchino "seemed more concerned about the icon being 'hastily' reinstalled rather than acknowledging the harm or offering an apology". The removal touched off a debate within the Catholic Church regarding inculturation and the melding of Apache and Catholic traditions.
