= St. Joseph Apache Mission Church =

Historic church in New Mexico, United States

- U.S. National Register of Historic Places
- NM State Register of Cultural Properties
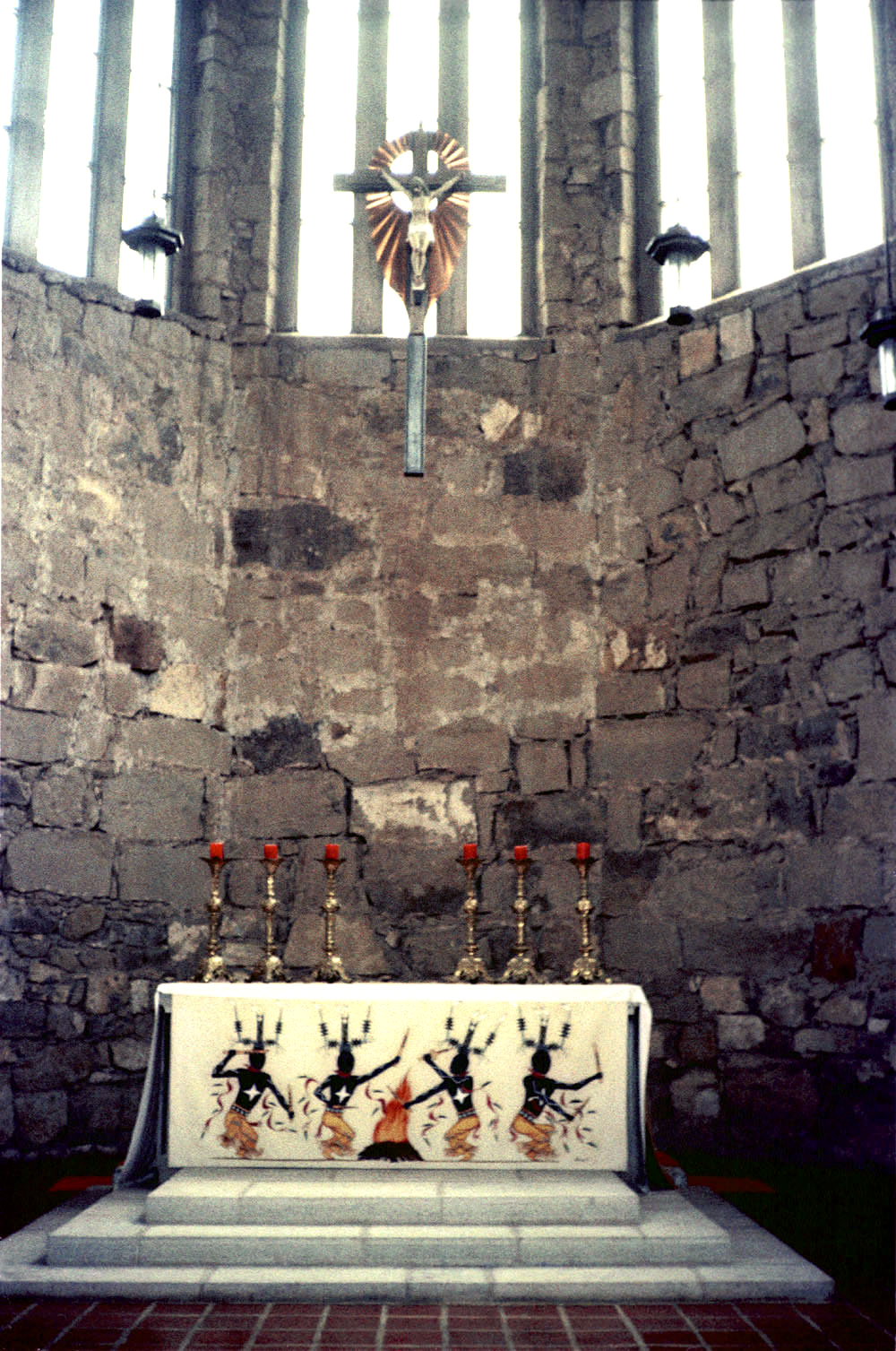
- Altar of St. Joseph's Church, in 1975

- Location within New Mexico Location within the United States
- Location: 626 Mission Trail, Mescalero, New Mexico
- Coordinates: 33°9′24″N 105°46′3″W
- Area: less than one acre
- Built: 1920-39
- Architect: William C. Stanton
- Architectural style: Late Gothic Revival
- Website: sites.google.com/stjosephapachemission.org/stjosephapachemission/about?authuser=0
- NRHP reference No.: 04001588
- NMSRCP No.: 1867

Significant dates
- Added to NRHP: February 1, 2005
- Designated NMSRCP: June 11, 2004

The St. Joseph Apache Mission Church is a historic Catholic parish church at 626 Mission Trail in Mescalero, New Mexico, United States. It was added to the National Register of Historic Places in 2005. Its parishioners are mostly members of the Mescalero Apache tribe.

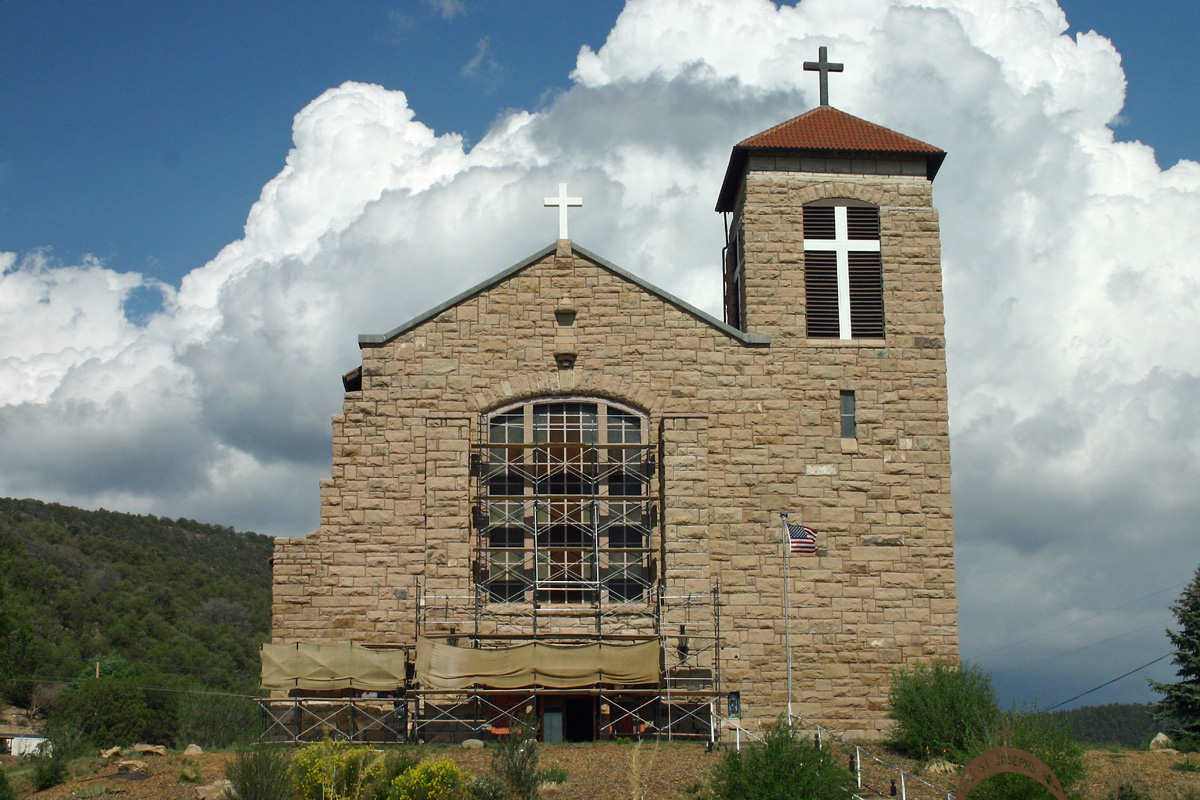
Exterior in 2013

The church was built upon the stone floor of a prehistoric Jornada Mogollon-culture ruin, estimated to date from 200 to 1400. It was designed in Late Gothic Revival style by Philadelphia architect William C. Stanton. Priest Albert Braun oversaw construction beginning in the 1920s.

The altar of the church features Apache Christ, an 8-foot painting, executed by Franciscan friar Robert Lentz in 1989, that depicts Christ as a Mescalero holy man greeting the sun atop Sierra Blanca; inscriptions around the painting are in both Apache and Greek. In 2024, the Diocese of Las Cruces removed the icon, a smaller work showing Native dancers, and ceramic chalices and baskets donated by the local Pueblo community for use in serving the Eucharist. The removal touched off a debate within the Catholic Church regarding inculturation and the melding of Apache and Catholic traditions. The diocese restored the works after their removal angered Apache parishioners; after the works were reinstalled, Bishop Peter Baldacchino met with the parish council.

== See also ==
- National Register of Historic Places listings in Otero County, New Mexico
