= Arvizu =

Arvizu is a surname of Basque origin, a variant of Arbizu. Notable people with the surname include:

- Abraham F. Arvizu, American community activist and youth developer
- Aída Marina Arvizu Rivas, Mexican politician
- Alexander Arvizu, American diplomat
- Dan Arvizu, American engineer
- Jorge Arvizu (1932–2014), Mexican voice actor
- Juan Arvizu, Mexican singer
- Manuel Arvizu (1919–2009), Mexican bishop
- María Hilaria Domínguez Arvizu, Mexican politician
- Reginald Arvizu (born 1969), American musician, bassist of Korn

== See also ==
- United States v. Arvizu, Supreme Court of the United States case
