= Arbizu (surname) =

Arbizu is a surname. It comes from the town Arbizu, which gets its name from the Basque word meaning "turnip field". A Navarrese noble family bearing the name grew out of Arbizu and Obanos, with a large and ancient branch in Gipuzkoa, as well as descendants in positions of prominence in Aragon. Members of the family held lordships and other noble titles in towns across Navarra and Gipuzkoa, including being the first lords of Muez. Notable people with the surname include:

- Amaia Romero Arbizu (born 1999), Spanish singer-songwriter
- Ana Arbizú y Flores (1825–1903), Honduran poet
- Genoveva Guardiola Arbizú (1858–1926), Honduran-Cuban school director and First Lady of Cuba
- Gregorio Arbizú (1823–1872), Salvadoran politician
- Lisandro Arbizu (born 1971), Argentine rugby union footballer
- Txomin Nagore Arbizu (born 1974), Spanish footballer

== See also ==
- Arvizu
