= Cathedral of the Immaculate Heart of Mary (Las Cruces, New Mexico) =

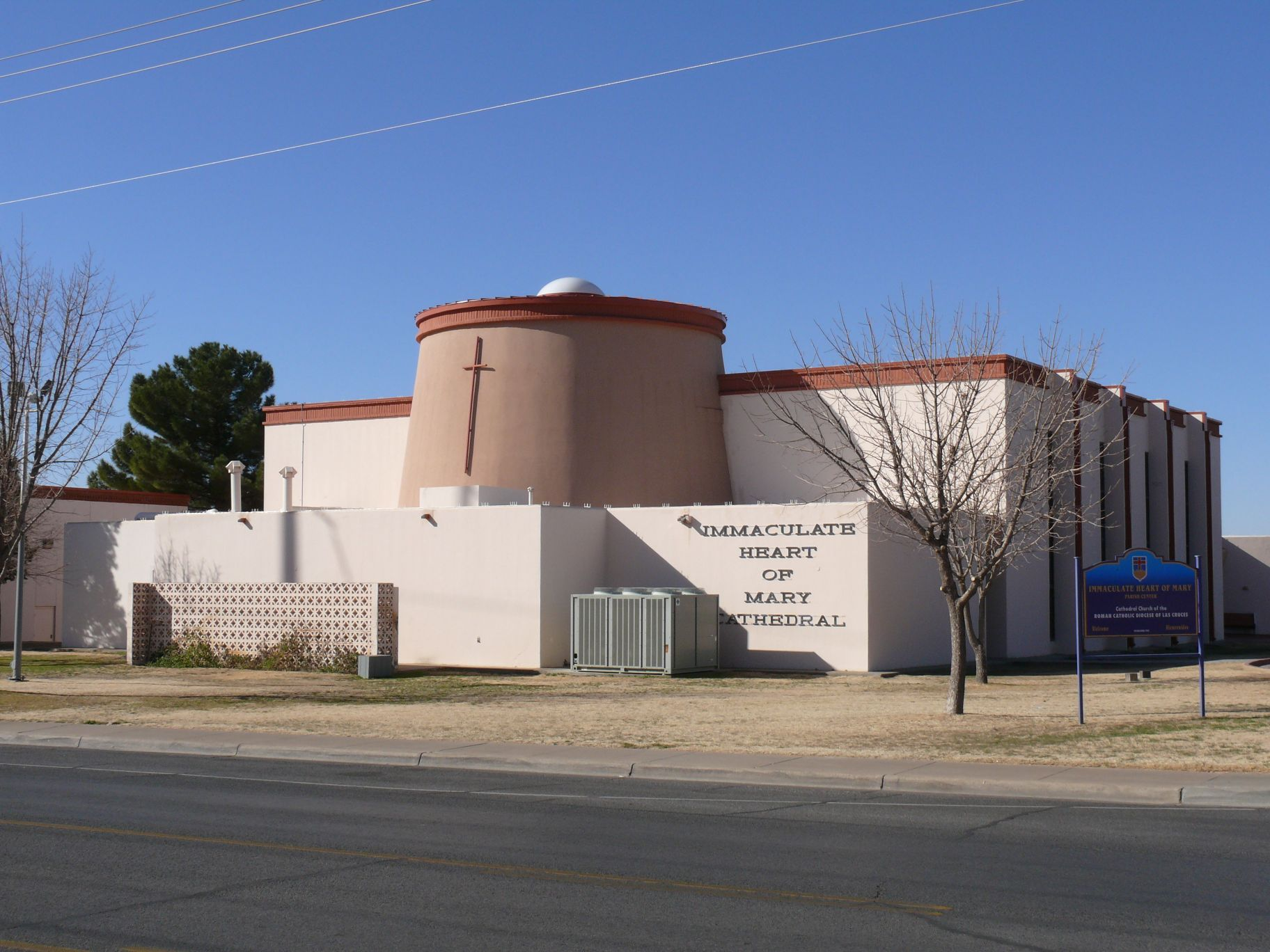

- Location in New Mexico Cathedral of the Immaculate Heart of Mary (the United States)
- 32°17′58″N 106°45′58″W
- Location: 1240 S. Espina; Las Cruces, New Mexico
- Country: United States
- Denomination: Roman Catholic Church

History
- Founded: 1953
- Dedicated: 1966

Architecture
- Style: Modern-Southwestern
- Groundbreaking: 1965
- Completed: 1966

Administration
- Diocese: Diocese of Las Cruces

Clergy
- Bishop: Most Rev. Peter Baldacchino
- Rector: Fr. Alejandro Reyes

The Cathedral of the Immaculate Heart of Mary is the mother church of the Roman Catholic Diocese of Las Cruces in Las Cruces, New Mexico in the United States.

== History ==
The first Immaculate Heart of Mary was a chapel constructed on the outskirts of Las Cruces in 1947. By the early 1950's, many workers from White Sands Missile Range started attending the church. It was erected as a parish in 1953. In 1957, the Immaculate Heart of Mary School opened. Construction of a new church began in 1965; it was dedicated in May 1966.

In 1982, Pope John Paul II erected the Diocese of Las Cruces. At that time, Immaculate Heart of Mary Church became the Cathedral of the Immaculate Heart of Mary.

Cathedral images

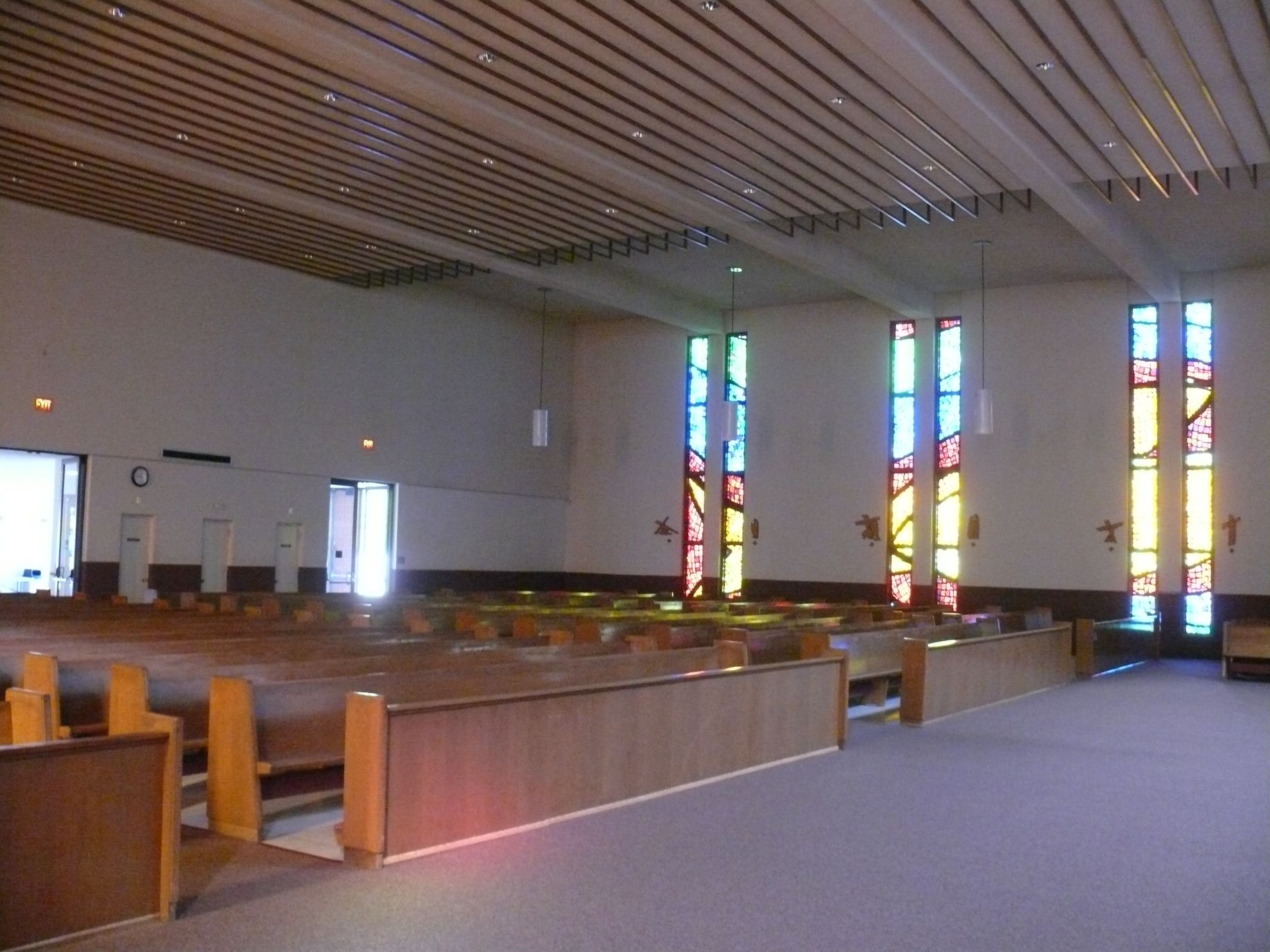
Cathedral nave (2013)

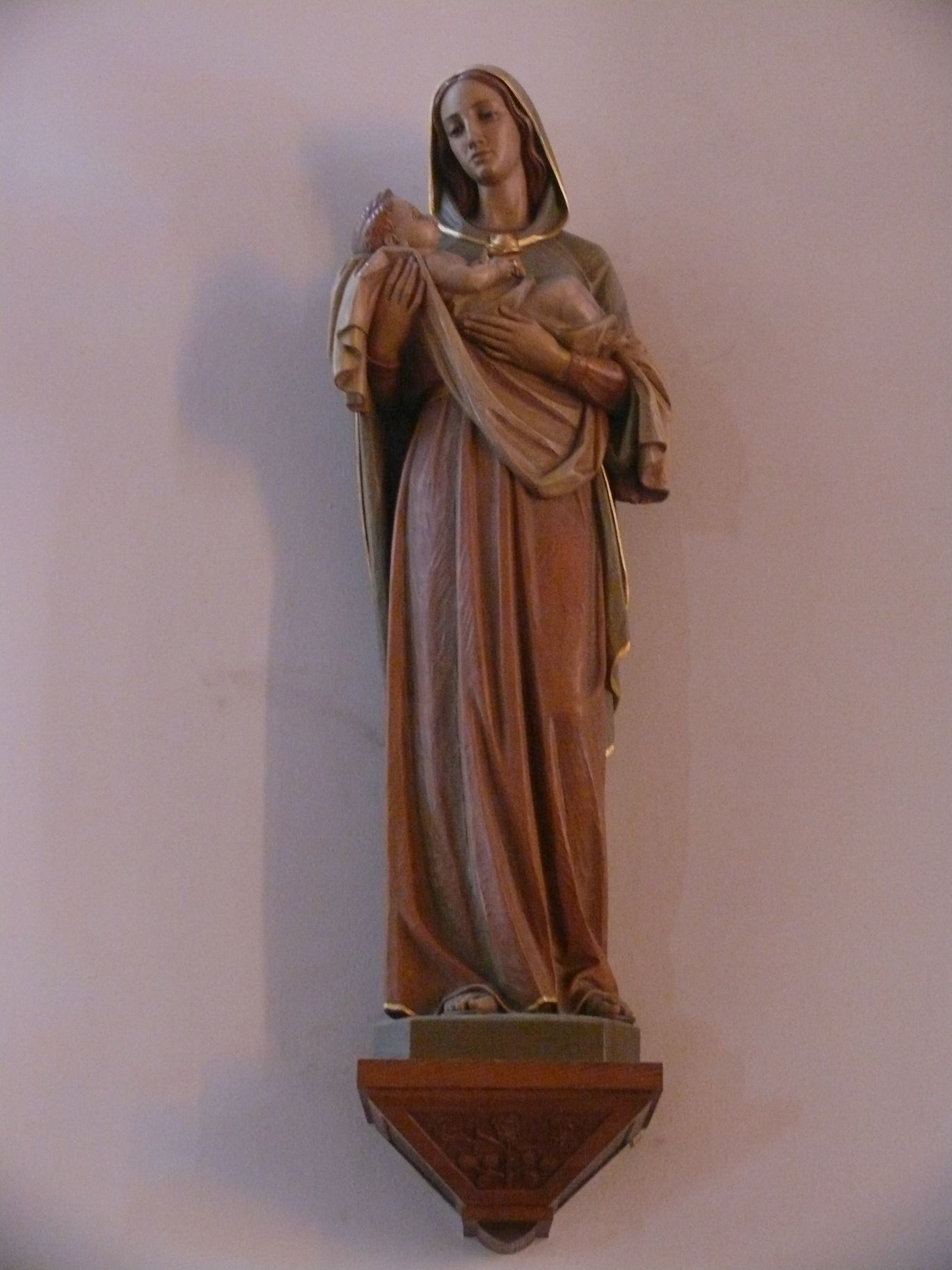
Mary with infant Jesus (2013)

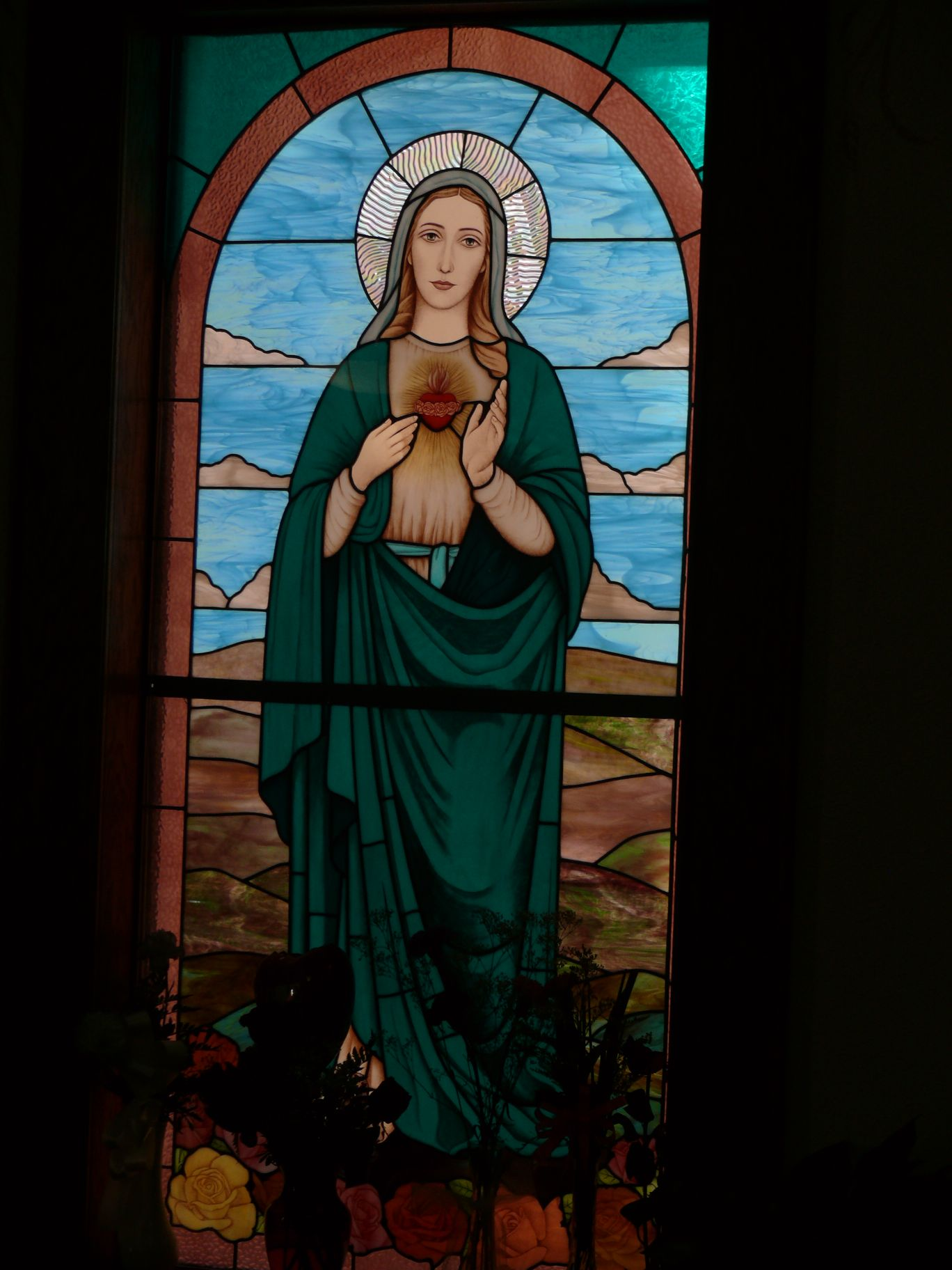
Virgin Mary stained glass (2013)

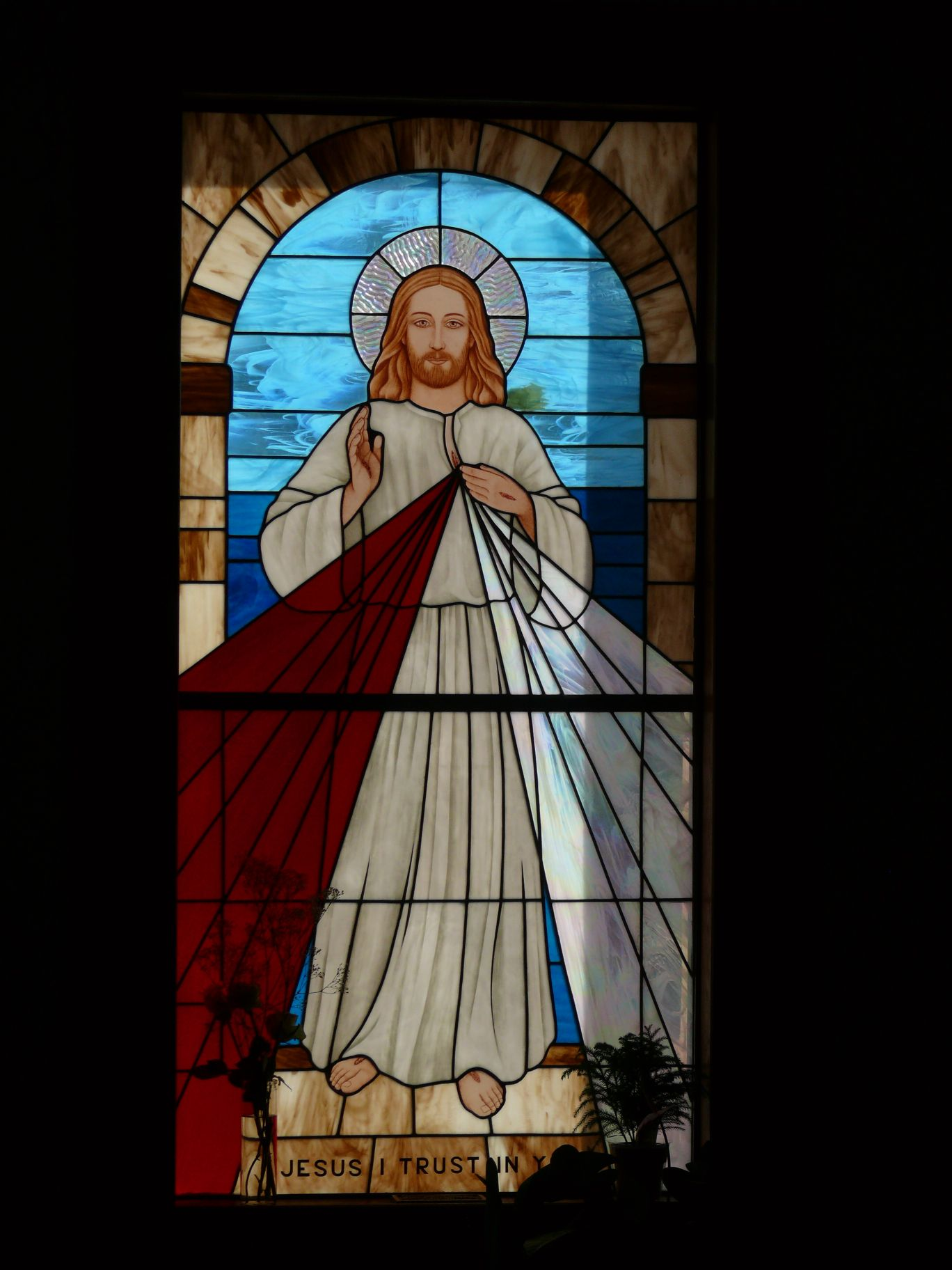
Christ stained glass window (2013)

== See also ==
- List of Catholic cathedrals in the United States
- List of cathedrals in the United States
