= Chicanos Por La Causa =

US non-profit organization

CPLC
- Chicanos Por La Causa
- Founded: 1969
- Headquarters: Phoenix, Arizona
- Location: United States
- President & Chief Executive Officer: Alicia Nuñez
- Website: www.cplc.org

Chicanos Por La Causa (CPLC) is a non-profit organization based in Arizona founded in 1969. It is a statewide community development corporation (CDC). It has staff of nearly 900 and impacts more than 1,000,000 people every year throughout Arizona, Nevada, New Mexico, Texas, and California.

Alicia Nuñez was named president and CEO of Chicanos por la Causa in April 2024 and named one of the most influential women in Arizona in 2025.

== History ==
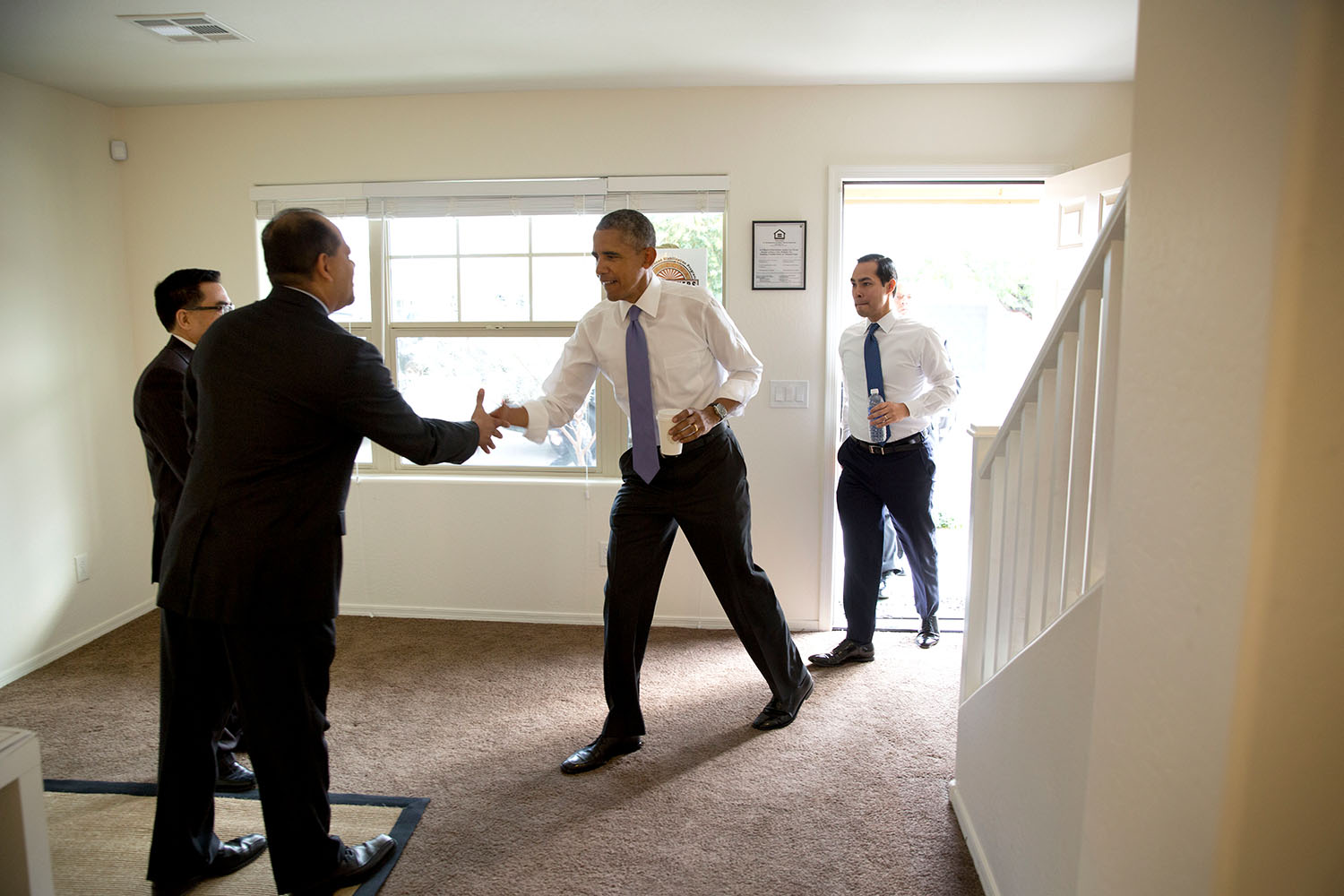
President Obama visiting CPLC housing project

CPLC was founded in 1969 by young Chicano men and women, hoping to improve the quality of life for Arizona's Mexican American population. Inspired by Dolores Huerta and Cesar Chavez, CPLC advocated for equity in education, politics, and labor conditions.

The organiization approached the parish council of the Historic Sacred Heart Church to use Santa Rita Hall for community engagement efforts. At the insistence of parish council member Abraham F. Arvizu, access was granted. Arvizu was subsequently elected to CPLC's Board of Directors. Santa Rita is credited with being the birthplace of CPLC.

With the financial support of National Council of La Raza, CPLC implemented programs focused on bilingual housing referral services for low-income communities in South Central Phoenix. In the 1970s, CPLC board member Guadalupe Huerta advocated for increased senior housing in response to the destruction of the Golden Gate Barrio by the City of Phoenix. This work led to the development of one of the earliest known senior housing projects in Phoenix, Casa de Primavera.
