= Robert Lentz =

American painter

Robert Lentz OFM
- Born: 1946 (age 79–80); Colorado
- Known for: Icon painting

Robert Lentz OFM (born 1946) is an American Franciscan friar and religious icon painter. He is particularly known for incorporating contemporary social themes into his icon work. He belongs to the Order of Friars Minor, and is currently stationed in Our Lady of Guadalupe Province.

== Life ==
Lentz was born in rural Colorado to a family of Russian descent and of a Russian Orthodox background. Lentz originally intended to enter the Franciscan Order as a young man in the 1960s, joining the formation program for St. John the Baptist Province, but left before taking his vows. Afterward, he was inspired by his family's Eastern Christian heritage and became interested in icon painting. He took up formal study in 1977 as an apprentice painter to a master of Greek icon painting from the school of Photios Kontoglou at Holy Transfiguration Monastery in Brookline, Massachusetts.

He then lived for a several decades in Albuquerque, New Mexico, working out of his Holy Prophet Elias Icon Studio. During his time in the Secular Franciscan community in New Mexico, Lentz developed a close relationship to the local friars, and again felt the call to join the order. He was received into the Order of Friars Minor in New Mexico in 2003, and transferred to the Holy Name Province on the East Coast in 2008. After relocating he taught at St. Bonaventure University. He was then stationed at Holy Name College in Silver Spring, Maryland. Since 2021, he has been back at St. Bonaventure Friary in New York.

Lentz is gay. In New Mexico, Lentz taught William Hart McNichols, another gay Christian iconographer. He also taught iconographer Lewis Williams, OFS.

== Work ==
While he first learned to paint with egg tempera (egg yolks mixed with powdered earth colors), he eventually learned how to adapt the technique to acrylic paint. He also uses real gold, which makes his work radiate light. Lentz's icons include fourteen large images of recently canonized saints, people of various cultures and ethnicities, and modern secular political and cultural figures. His 1989 icon, Apache Christ, depicts Jesus as a Mescalero holy man and is displayed in the St. Joseph Apache Mission Church. Toby Johnson calls Lentz's icon of Harvey Milk "a national gay treasure". His 1994 icon of Sergius and Bacchus was first displayed at Chicago's Gay Pride Parade, and has become a popular symbol in the gay Christian community. Addison H. Hart of Touchstone criticized Lentz's works for breaking with the traditional purpose of Christian icons, writing that they "do not serve as vehicles of the tradition, but as propaganda and individual expression". Some of his work is featured with the text of a Joan Chittister's book as listed in the bibliography below. Reproductions of his images are available through Trinity Stores.

== Bibliography ==
- A Passion for Life: Fragments of the Face of God, by Joan D. Chittister and Robert Lentz, 1996, Orbis Books, 132 pages, ISBN 978-1-57075-076-2
- Christ in the Margins, by Robert Lentz and Edwina Gately, 2003, Orbis Books, 144 pages, ISBN 978-1-57075-321-3
