= Oscar Cantú =

Mexican-American Catholic prelate (born 1966)

His Excellency, The Most Reverend Oscar Cantú
- Bishop of San José in California
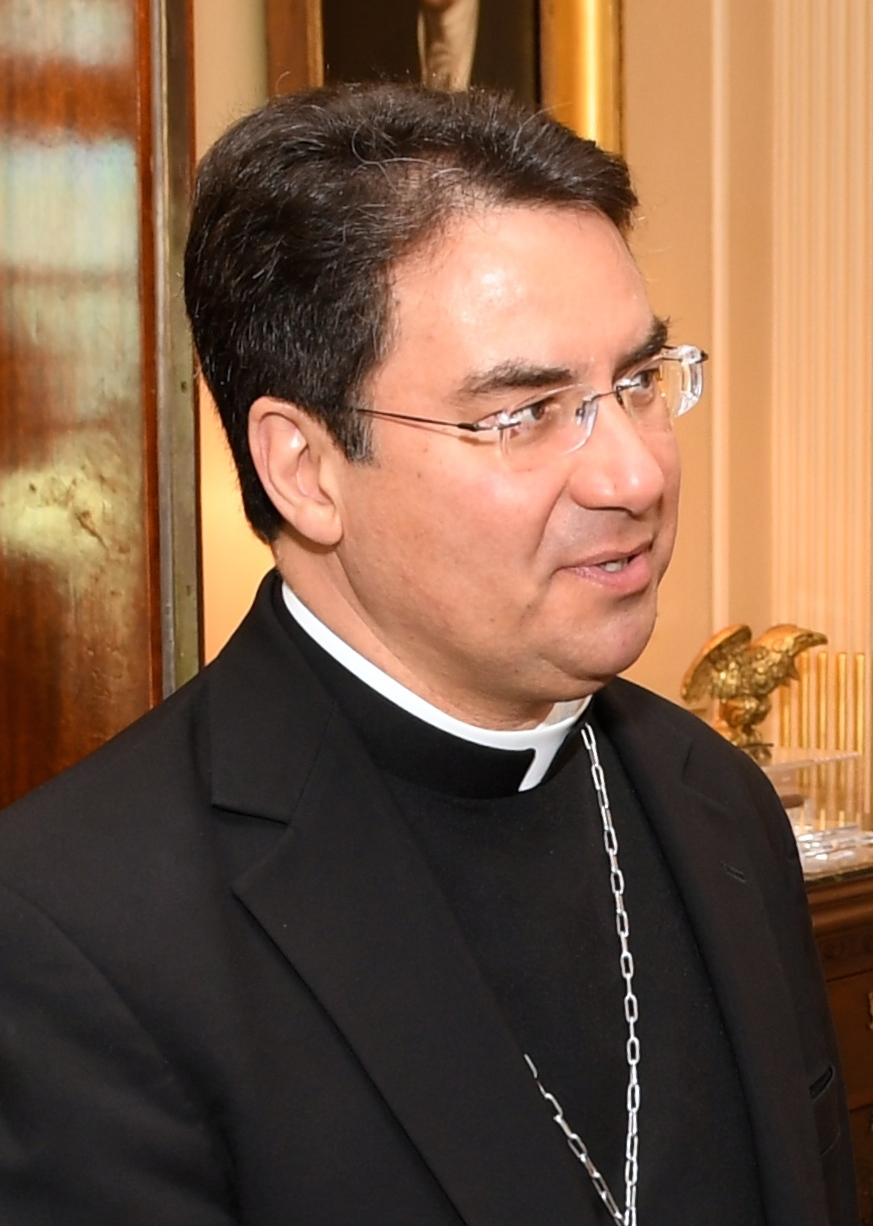
- Cantú in 2017
- Diocese: San Jose
- Appointed: July 11, 2018 (as Coadjutor)
- Installed: May 1, 2019
- Predecessor: Patrick Joseph McGrath
- Previous posts: Auxiliary Bishop of San Antonio and Titular Bishop of Dardanus (2008-2013); Bishop of Las Cruces (2013-2018)

Orders
- Ordination: May 21, 1994 by Joseph Fiorenza
- Consecration: June 2, 2008 by José Horacio Gómez, Joseph Fiorenza, and Joe S. Vásquez

Personal details
- Born: December 5, 1966 (age 59) Houston, Texas
- Education: University of Dallas; University of St. Thomas; Pontifical Gregorian University.
- Motto: Zelus domus Tuae comedit me (Latin for 'Zeal for the house of the Lord consumes me')

Styles of Oscar Cantú
- Reference style: His Excellency
- Spoken style: Your Excellency
- Religious style: Bishop

Oscar Cantú (born December 5, 1966) is a Mexican-American Catholic prelate who serves as Bishop of San José in California.

Cantú served as Bishop of Las Cruces from 2013 to 2018, and as an auxiliary bishop of the Archdiocese of San Antonio from 2008 to 2013. When Cantú became a bishop in 2008, he was the youngest in the United States.

== Biography ==
=== Early years ===
Cantú was born on December 5, 1966, in Houston, Texas, the son of Ramiro and Maria de Jesus Cantú. He is the fifth of eight children. Oscar Cantú attended Holy Name Catholic School and St. Thomas High School in Houston. After graduating, he attended the University of Dallas and received a Bachelor of Arts degree there.

Having decided to become a priest, Cantú entered the University of St. Thomas in Houston, where he received his Master of Divinity and Master of Theological Studies degrees. He is fluent in English, Spanish, Italian, and French.

=== Priesthood ===
Cantú was ordained a priest at Saint Francis de Sales Church in Houston by Archbishop Joseph Fiorenza for the Archdiocese of Galveston-Houston on May 21, 1994. After his ordination, the archdiocese assigned Cantú as parochial vicar at St. Christopher Parish in Houston. He taught at the University of St. Thomas and at St. Mary's Seminary, and served as pastor of Holy Name Parish.

In 1998, Cantú traveled to Rome to attend the Pontifical Gregorian University. He was awarded a Licentiate in Sacred Theology and a Doctor of Dogmatic Theology degree there in 2002. Cantú conducted youth retreats in the Christian Family Movement in the archdiocese and worked with the Engaged Encounter ministry. He was also involved in The Metropolitan Organization (TMO), which addresses fair housing, immigration, and education.

=== Auxiliary Bishop of San Antonio ===
Pope Benedict XVI appointed Cantú titular bishop of Dardanus and auxiliary bishop of San Antonio in 2008. He was consecrated a bishop at Saint Mark the Evangelist Church in San Antonio on June 2, 2008, by Archbishop José Gómez, with Archbishop Joseph Fiorenza and Bishop Joe S. Vásquez serving as co-consecrators.

At the time of his consecration, Cantú was the youngest bishop in the United States. He chose as his episcopal motto Zelus domus tuae comedit me (Zeal for the Lord's house consumes me).

=== Bishop of Las Cruces ===
Coat of arms as bishop of Las Cruces

On January 10, 2013, Benedict XVI named Cantú as the second bishop of Las Cruces. He was installed on February 28, 2013. At the time, he was the youngest bishop to head an American diocese.

Cantú visited Japan in 2015 for the ceremonies marking the 70th anniversary of the atomic bombings of Nagasaki and Hiroshima by the US Army Air Corps during World War II. He served as a representative of the United States Conference of Catholic Bishops (USCCB) at the state visit of Pope Francis to Mexico in February 2016.

=== Bishop of San Jose ===
Pope Francis appointed Cantú as coadjutor bishop of San Jose on July 11, 2018, to assist Bishop Patrick J. McGrath. He was installed on September 28, 2018. On May 1, 2019, after McGrath's retirement, Cantú automatically succeeded him as bishop of San Jose.

Cantú chaired the USCCB Committee on International Justice and Peace from 2015 to 2017. In that role, he visited churches in the Middle East, Africa, Latin America, and Asia. These included churches in South Sudan and the Democratic Republic of the Congo that were under great duress. He twice visited Iraq and Cuba. Cantú visited churches in Gaza, Jerusalem, Israel, and the West Bank, advocating the Catholic Church position on a two-state solution to the conflict between Israel and the Palestinians. He spoke at the United Nations against the proliferation of nuclear weapons. He called for religious liberty in the Middle East, Indonesia, Malaysia, and India.

In November 2020, the Congregation for Bishops at the Vatican initiated an investigation into Cantú's handling of allegations of clerical sexual abuse and misconduct when he was bishop of Las Cruces. The Congregation was carrying out its investigation under the provisions of Vos estis lux mundi. The investigation was headed by Bishop Thomas Olmsted of the Diocese of Phoenix.

== Viewpoints ==
=== Diversity in the Catholic Church ===
In a 2022 interview with Catholic California Daily, Cantú questioned why there were so few American bishops of Hispanic ancestry. He said:

“I think we have a distinct opportunity to be bridges from the historical institutional church in the United States to a growing population whose voice has not always been asked for, whose experiences and opinions have not always been sought.”

== See also ==
- Catholic Church hierarchy
- Catholic Church in the United States
- Historical list of the Catholic bishops of the United States
- List of Catholic bishops of the United States
- Lists of patriarchs, archbishops, and bishops

== Episcopal succession ==
Catholic Church titles
Preceded by Patrick Joseph McGrath	Bishop of San José; 2019-Present	Succeeded by Incumbent
Preceded by -	Coadjutor Bishop of San José; 2018-2019	Succeeded by -
Preceded by Ricardo Ramírez, CSB	Bishop of Las Cruces; 2013-2018	Succeeded by Peter Baldacchino
Preceded by Thomas Flannagan	Auxiliary Bishop of San Antonio; 2008-2013	Succeeded by Michael Joseph Boulette
