= Ricardo Ramírez (bishop) =

American prelate

His Excellency, The Most Reverend Ricardo Ramírez, C.S.B.
- Bishop Emeritus of Las Cruces
- Diocese: Las Cruces
- Appointed: August 17, 1982
- Installed: October 18, 1982
- Retired: January 10, 2013
- Predecessor: First Bishop
- Successor: Oscar Cantú
- Previous post: Auxiliary Bishop of San Antonio and Titular Bishop of Vatarba (1981-1982)

Orders
- Ordination: December 10, 1966 by John Louis Morkovsky
- Consecration: December 6, 1981 by Patrick Fernández Flores, John Louis Morkovsky, and Rafael Ayala y Ayala

Personal details
- Born: Ricardo Ramírez; September 12, 1936 (age 90) Bay City, Texas
- Denomination: Roman Catholic
- Parents: Natividad and María (née Espinosa) Ramírez
- Education: University of St. Thomas; St. Basil's Seminary; Seminario Conciliar; University of Detroit
- Motto: Make me an instrument of your peace

Styles of Ricardo Ramírez, C.S.B.
- Reference style: His Excellency; The Most Reverend
- Spoken style: Your Excellency
- Religious style: Bishop

Ricardo Ramírez, C.S.B. (born September 12, 1936) is an American Catholic prelate who served as the first bishop of Las Cruces in New Mexico from 1982 to 2013. He previously served as an auxiliary bishop for the Archdiocese of San Antonio in Texas from 1981 to 1982. He is a member of the Congregation of St. Basil (Basilians).

== Biography ==
=== Early life ===
Ricardo Ramírez was born on September 12, 1936, in Bay City, Texas, as the second of the two children of Natividad and Maria (née Espinosa) Ramírez. Up to the sixth grade, he attended a segregated school for Mexican-American students. At that time, he started working after school to help the family finances. In 1942, Ramirez entered Jefferson Davis Grammar school in Bay City and Bay City High School in 1951, graduating in 1955. Ramírez then studied at the University of St. Thomas in Houston, where he obtained his bachelor's degree in 1959.

On September 12, 1960, Ramirez joined the Basilians. He spent his first six months at a so-called boot camp in Michigan, then taught English and history in schools in Los Angeles and Houston. In 1963, Ramirez entered St. Basil's Seminary in Toronto, Ontario. In 1965, he finished his studies at the Conciliar Seminary of Mexico in Mexico City.

=== Priesthood ===
On December 10, 1966, Ramírez was ordained to the priesthood for the Basilians by Bishop John Morkovsky at St. Ann Catholic Church in Houston.

After his ordination, the Basilians assigned Ramirez as an assistant pastor to St. Mary's Parish in Owen Sound, Ontario for six months. In 1967, he entered the University of Detroit, graduating in 1968 with a Master of Arts degree. Ramirez then moved to Mexico City, where he served as chaplain to university students at the Centro Cultural Aragón. In 1970. he started working with the Family Religious Education Project in Tehuacán, Mexico, serving there until 1976. During this period, Ramírez also studied at the East Asian Pastoral Institute of Ateneo de Manila University in Manila, Philippines (1973-1974).

After returning to San Antonio in 1976, Remirez was appointed as executive vice president of the Mexican American Cultural Center (now the Mexican American Catholic College) in San Antonio, Texas.

=== Auxiliary Bishop of San Antonio ===
On October 27, 1981, Pope John Paul II appointed Ramírez as an auxiliary bishop of San Antonio and titular bishop of Vatarba. He was consecrated at the Henry B. González Convention Center in San Antonio on December 6, 1981, by Archbishop Patrick Flores, with Bishops Morkovsky and Rafael Ayala y Ayala serving as co-consecrators.

=== Bishop of Las Cruces ===
On August 17, 1982, John Paul II appointed Ramírez as the first bishop of Las Cruces. He was installed on October 18. 1982 at the Pan American Center in Las Cruces, New Mexico.

Ramírez had to build the new diocese, creating a small diocesan office with one manual typewriter and the diocese's tribunal and appointing his priest councilors. Within the United States Conference of Catholic Bishops (USCCB), Ramirez sat on the International Policy Committee, the Committee on the Liturgy, and the Committee on Hispanic Affairs. He formerly chaired the Committee on the Church in Latin America and the Catholic Campaign for Human Development. He was also a member of the Advisory Committee of the Catholic Common Ground Initiative.

Ramirez was appointed as a member of the US State Department's Advisory Committee on Religious Freedom Abroad. He also served on the U.S. Commission on International Religious Freedom, traveling to China, Egypt and other parts of Africa.

== Retirement ==
On January 10, 2013, Ramírez's resignation as bishop of Las Cruces was accepted by Pope Benedict XVI, to be succeeded by Bishop Oscar Cantú. Ramirez retired in Las Cruces.

In 2016, Ramirez published his book Power from the Margins: The Emergence of the Latino in the Church and in Society.

== See also ==
- Catholic Church hierarchy
- Catholic Church in the United States
- Historical list of the Catholic bishops of the United States
- List of Catholic bishops of the United States
- Lists of patriarchs, archbishops, and bishops

== Episcopal succession ==
Catholic Church titles
Preceded by First Bishop	Bishop of Las Cruces; 1982–2013	Succeeded by Oscar Cantú
Preceded by -	Auxiliary Bishop of San Antonio; 1981–1982	Succeeded by -
