= Santa Rita Hall =

Historic church in Phoenix, Arizona

Coordinates: 33°26′18.8″N 112°3′37.3″W

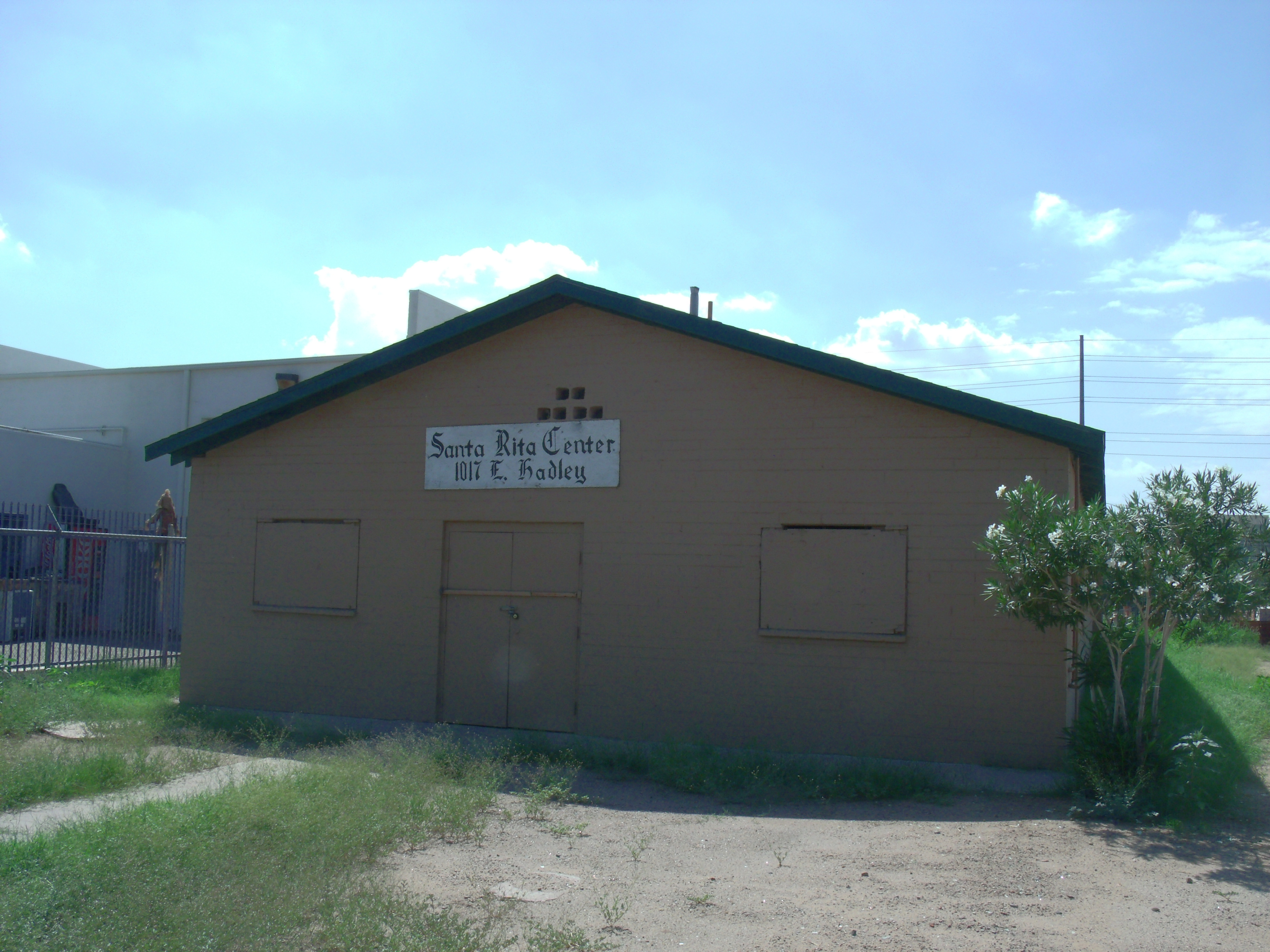
- Interactive map of the Santa Rita Hall area

General information
- Location: Phoenix, Arizona

Santa Rita Center, or Santa Rita Hall, is an unoccupied church hall at 10th Street and Hadley Roads, which was placed on the Phoenix Historic Property Register in October 2007, which has the same eligibility criteria as the National Register of Historic Places. It is one of three church halls stemming from the three chapels of the Historic Sacred Heart Church. It was purchased by the Chicanos Por La Causa, non-profit organisation, in 2004 for $71,000.

== Cultural and historical significance ==
Father Albert Braun believed that the Church should go to its people, and began constructing chapels in the southern and eastern sections of the Sacred Heart Parish, with the start of Santa Rita's construction on November 20, 1956, and completion in 1957. Parish sponsored community events took place at the center, including internally generated self-help programs, such as the Southside Catholic Youth Center, spearheaded by Abraham F. Arvizu.

Beginning in the late 1960s, in correlation with the civil rights movement, Santa Rita Hall became a focal point of the Chicano Movement, particularly with the incorporation of Chicanos Por La Causa at Santa Rita in April 1969. The Barrio Youth Project was the next movement to come out of Santa Rita, with a $2,000 pledge by Chicanos Por La Causa, an arrangement similar to the Southside Catholic Youth Center's support for the local Feria de las Flores. Valle del Sol was the last organization to come out of Santa Rita, catalyzed by a meeting held on December 3, 1970. These organizations organized the boycott against the Phoenix Union High School District from October 9 - November 2, 1970, with 50 percent of student participation, which led to systemic changes to end the discrimination of Mexican-Americans within the local school system.

Just 18 months after the Phoenix Union High School District boycott, Santa Rita became the center of national attention because of Cesar Chavez's 24-Day Fast for Justice in 1972. The fast was initiated due to the Arizona Legislature's House Bill 2134, which restricted the formation of bargaining units for collective bargaining. Many national figures traveled to Santa Rita in support of Chavez, such as Democratic Presidential Candidate George McGovern, Joan Baez, Coretta Scott King, and Joe and Michael Kennedy, sons of Democratic Presidential Candidate Robert F. Kennedy, who was assassinated later that evening.

Today, Santa Rita is owned by Chicanos Por La Causa, and the center is used for special meetings and events.
