= Sacred Heart Church (Phoenix, Arizona) =

- U.S. National Register of Historic Places
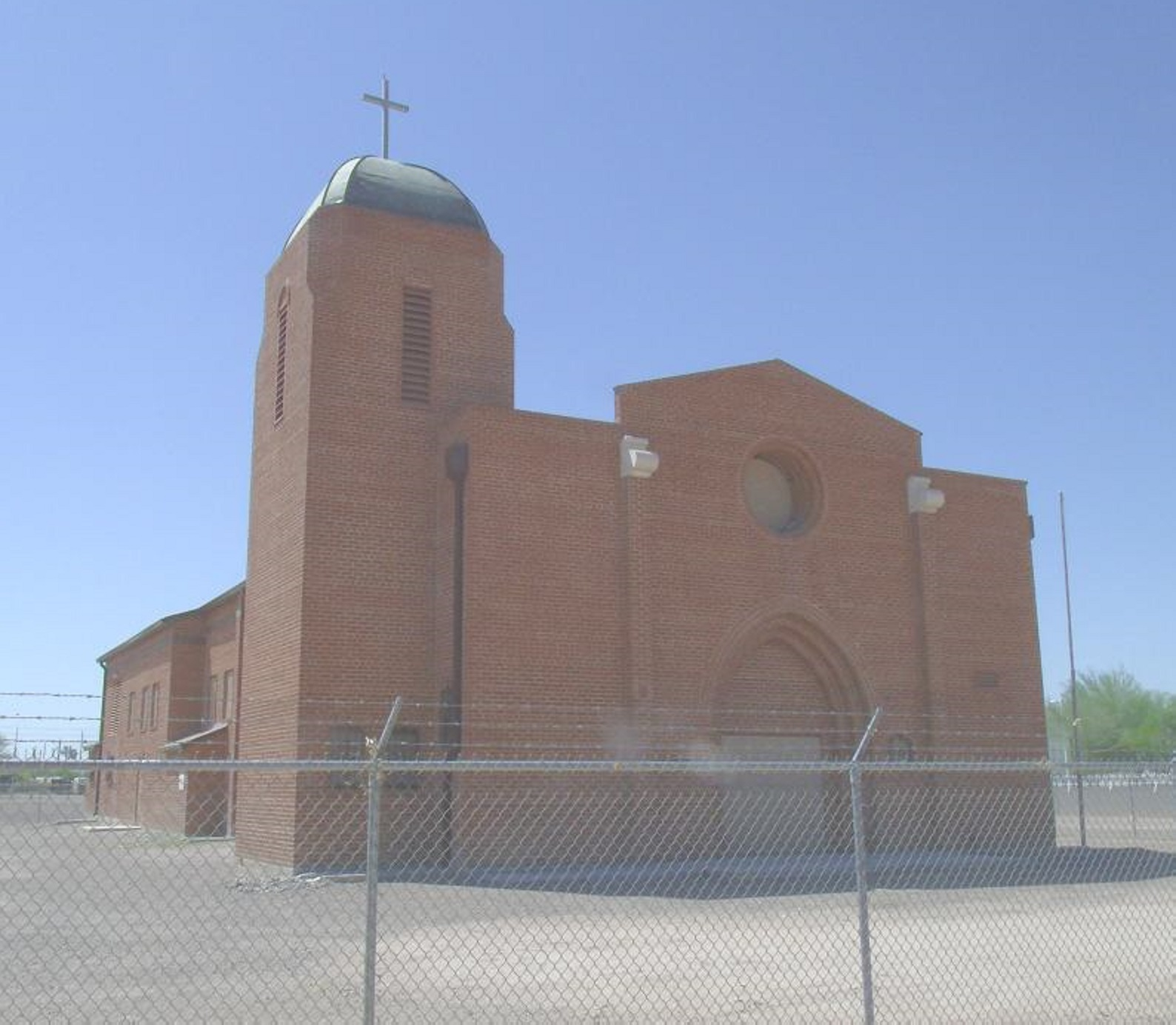
- Sacred Heart Church
- Location: 920 S. 17th St., Phoenix, Arizona
- Coordinates: 33.43436°N 112.056203°W
- Area: 0.2 acres (0.081 ha)
- Built: 1954
- Architect: Albert Braun
- Architectural style: Modern Movement
- NRHP reference No.: 12000124
- Added to NRHP: March 20, 2012

Sacred Heart Church, or Historic Sacred Heart Church, is an unoccupied church located at or around 16th St and Buckeye Roads in Phoenix, AZ, which was placed on the National Register of Historic Places by the US Department of Interior with the efforts of the Braun Sacred Heart Center Inc., City of Phoenix Historic Preservation Office, and the State Historic Preservation Office in 2012. The lot the Sacred Heart Church sits on is owned by the City of Phoenix, Aviation Department. Sacred Heart Church was the pillar of the Golden Gate Barrio, and the Braun Sacred Heart Center Inc. has been hosting a yearly Christmas Day Mass at noon for former residents since 1987, with the permission of the City of Phoenix. On May 19, 2021, the Diocese of Phoenix published a press release announcing that the Sacred Heart Parish had signed a lease agreement with the City of Phoenix for use of the Church property after selling the property to the City of Phoenix over three decades prior.

== History ==
Around 1950, Victor Stinger donated a small lot at 17th and Sherman Streets in Phoenix, AZ to be used for Catholic mass for the residents of the Golden Gate Barrio and its surrounding barrios. The original structure was a ramada with a dirt floor and a palm thatch roof.

The construction of Sacred Heart Church is credited to Albert Braun. Around 1952, Father Al, as he was known, began working within the community and requested that he remain in the barrios and not be moved around like "all the others" until he "completed his work". Father Al held his first mass under the ramada on August 10, 1952 and held mass there for two and one half years.

During this two and one half year period, Father Al began acquiring land through political activism and brick through a local fundraising campaign within the Golden Gate Barrio whereas every single resident, including children, would each buy at least one red brick after the supply of adobe bricks was destroyed in a rain storm. With an $8,000 loan from the Bishop of Tucson, the rectory was completed on March 15, 1954. Two chapels were constructed on the southern and eastern sections of the parish: Saint Isabel (later named Saint John's) on 18th St. and Magnolia and Saint Mary Magdalene on 11th St. and Hilton with first mass dates being on March 18, 1954 and May 17, 1954, respectively. Only after these chapels were built did the construction of the main church begin, being blessed by Bishop Gercke on October 14 1956. Construction of Santa Rita Hall began on November 20, 1956 to serve the residents of El Campito, and was completed in 1957. The altar, made of Italian marble, the roof, bell tower, and copper dome were added shortly after, completing construction. Father Al left the parish in 1962, but remain involved in the church at various capacities until his death in 1983.

The Diocese of Phoenix sold the Church to the City of Phoenix, Aviation Department in 1985 through the West Approach Land Acquisition.

== Cultural and historical significance ==
Although Sacred Heart Parish was one of the poorest parishes during its active tenure, Father Al committed the church to the community by having its two most active parishioners, Ramon Arvizu and Pete Avila, graduate from St. Vincent De Paul Society's charity training school to help the local residents with food insecurity and inadequate housing. Ramon Arvizu was the father of the late Abraham F. Arvizu, a pioneering community activist from Phoenix, AZ.

Understanding the importance of community cohesion, Father Al and his parishioners continued to address non-religious needs such as lighting, pavements, and sewage systems. A local juvenile court worker stated that after Father Al's arrival, "the number of juvenile cases dropped sharply as those persons under his influence began working together as family units and as a community".

Historically, the site is the last remaining structure from the Golden Gate Barrio. The Golden Gate Barrio and its nearly 6,000 residents were forced out of their homes under eminent domain through the West Approach Land Acquisition in the 1970s and 1980s.
