= Abraham F. Arvizu =

Community activist and youth developer (1928–1988)

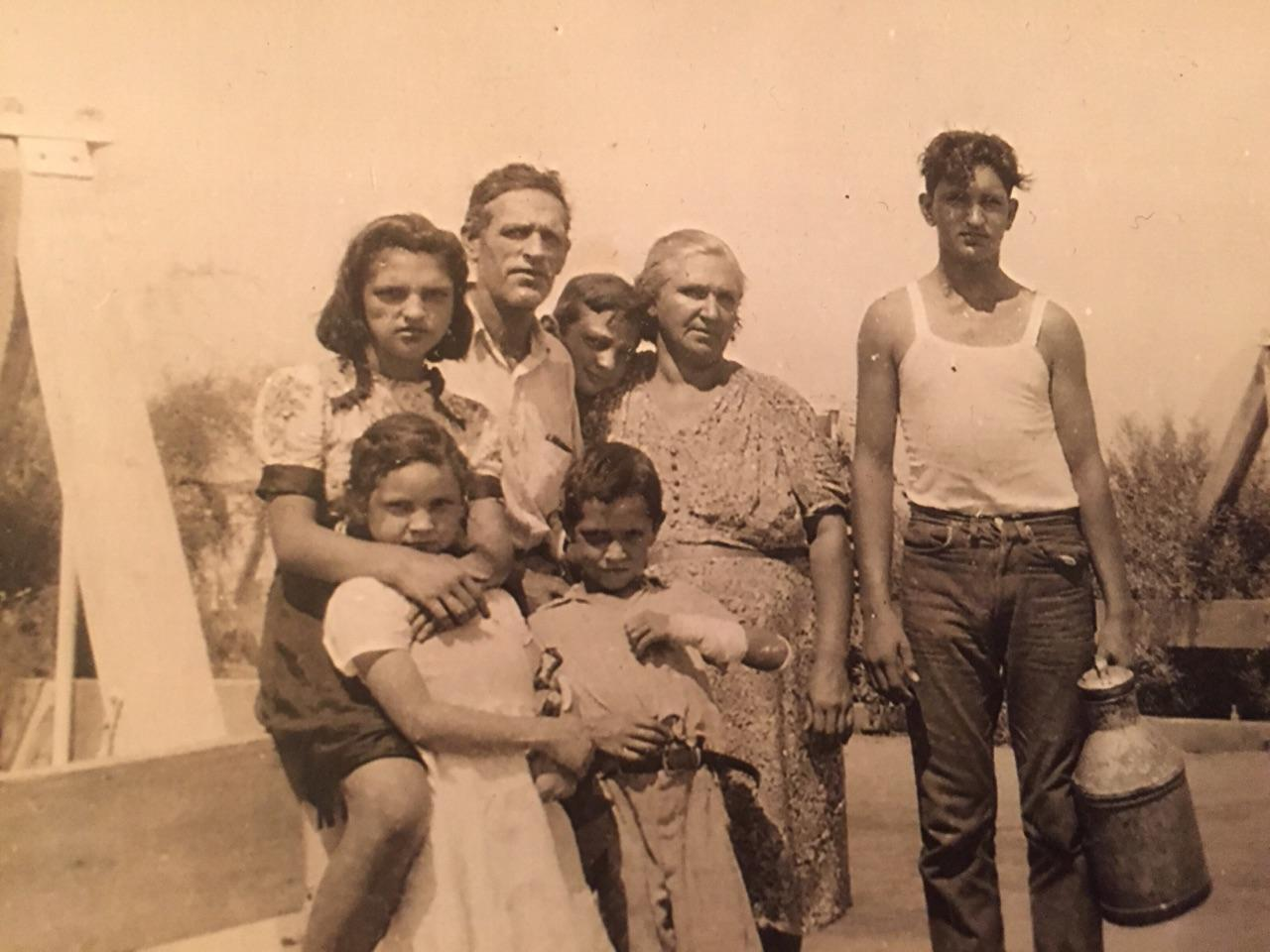
Abraham F. Arvizu (standing, far right) and family, including Ramon Arvizu

Abraham F. Arvizu, or Abe Arvizu Sr. (1928–1988), was a pioneering community activist and youth developer from Phoenix, Arizona, and is credited with being the President and "driving force" of the Southside Catholic Youth Center, the forerunner of the Barrio Youth Project, impacting thousands of South Phoenix youth. Barrio Youth Project and Chicanos Por La Causa organized the boycott against the Phoenix Union High School District from October 9 – November 2, 1970, which led to systematic wide changes to end the discrimination of Mexican-Americans within the local school system. Arvizu, a member of the parish council of the Historic Sacred Heart Church, advocated and voted in support of allowing young Chicano activists to use Santa Rita Hall for community engagement efforts, which led to the founding of Chicanos Por La Causa in 1969. For his efforts, Arvizu was subsequently elected to the Board of Directors of Chicanos Por La Causa, representing barrios east of Central Avenue, and many of the youth he developed went on to be political activists, elected officials, and contributing members to society. He was married to Mariana Ochoa until his death. The couple had four children: Abraham J. Arvizu, Jr., Michael Arvizu, Cynthia "Cindi" Arvizu, and Linda Arvizu.

== Preservation of Sacred Heart Church ==
Abraham F. Arvizu Sr.'s commitment to Sacred Heart Church began in the early 1950s, when he and other parishioners contributed manual labor to construct the church, establishing it as a central hub for the Mexican-American community in South Phoenix.

In December 1986, the City of Phoenix purchased Sacred Heart Church for commercial development, placing it at risk of demolition. To prevent this, Arvizu co-founded Braun-Sacred Heart Center, Inc., a nonprofit organization dedicated to preserving the church. Under his leadership, the organization aimed to raise $250,000 to renovate the building and transform it into a museum and cultural center honoring Father Albert Braun, a decorated World War I and II veteran known for his dedication to the community.

Arvizu emphasized the church's historical and cultural significance, recalling the last Mass he attended there on December 29, 1985, which was so crowded that attendees stood both inside and outside the building. He initiated the annual Christmas Day Mass at Sacred Heart Church, a tradition that continues to this day. The Mass serves as a symbolic gathering for former parishioners and community members, reinforcing their lasting connection to the historic church despite its closure as an active parish. The event has become a significant cultural and religious observance, drawing attendees from across the region.

Through persistent efforts, the Braun-Sacred Heart Center collaborated with city and state officials to recognize the church's importance. These endeavors culminated in Sacred Heart Church being added to the National Register of Historic Places on March 20, 2012.

Arvizu's legacy in preserving Sacred Heart Church continues through his family. His son, Abe Arvizu Jr., has been actively involved in ongoing preservation efforts, serving as chairman of the board for the Braun-Sacred Heart Center and advocating for the church's recognition as a historical site.
