= Obanos =

Town and municipality in northern Spain

Coordinates: 42°41′N 1°47′W

Obanos is a town and municipality located in the province and autonomous community of Navarre, northern Spain.

== Demography ==
From:INE Archiv

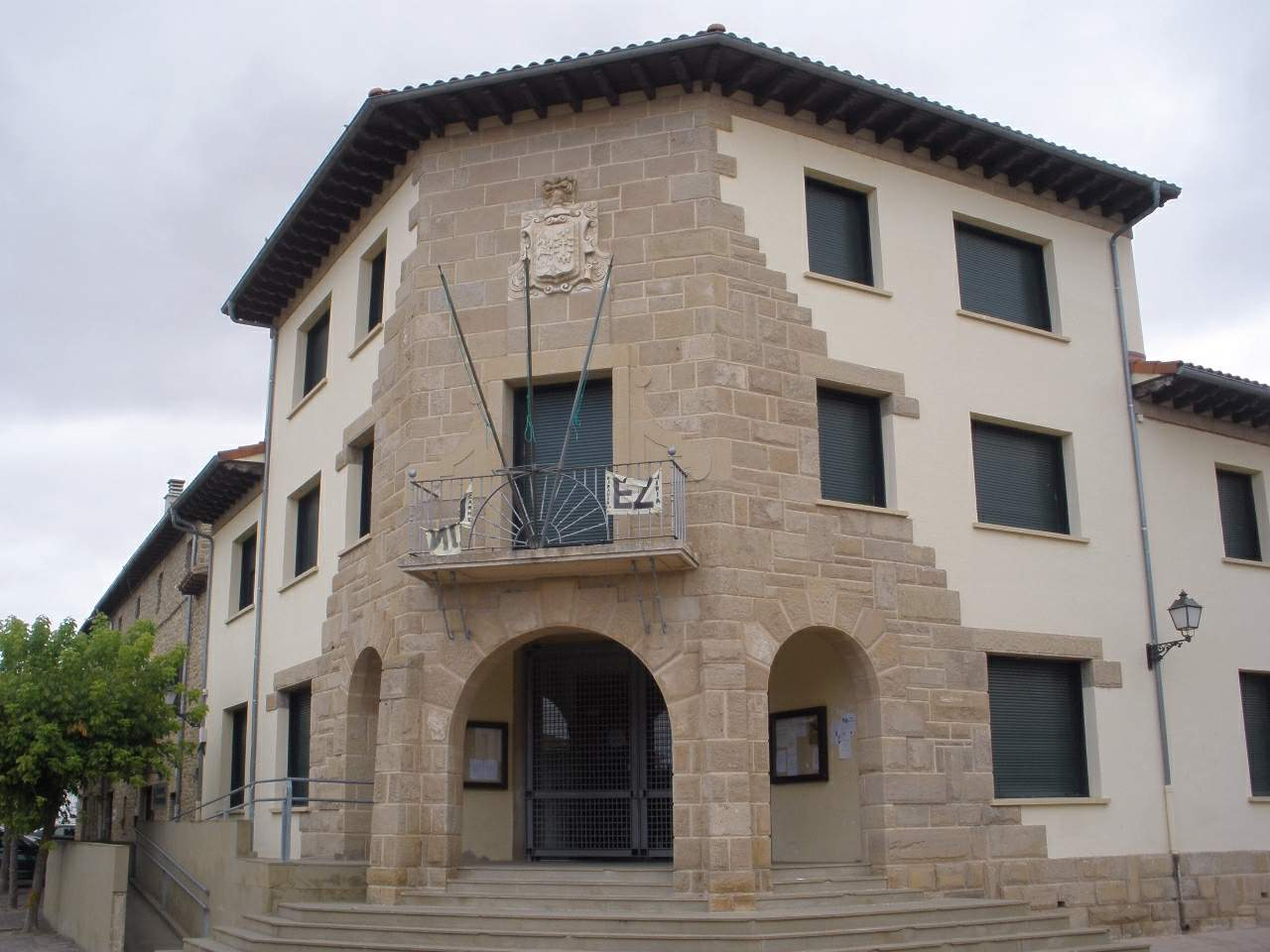
Obanos Town Hall
