= Golden Gate Barrio =

Former neighborhood in Phoenix, Arizona

Coordinates: 33.438°N 112.045°W

Golden Gate Barrio was a historic Mexican-American neighborhood in the Eastside of Phoenix, Arizona. The neighborhood was razed due to eminent domain for the expansion of Phoenix Sky Harbor International Airport in the 1970s and 1990s through the West Approach Land Acquisition Project.

In 1953 Father Albert Braun helped found Sacred Heart Church in neighborhood. Sacred Heart Church is the only remaining structure in the neighborhood located at 920 S. 17th Street in Phoenix.

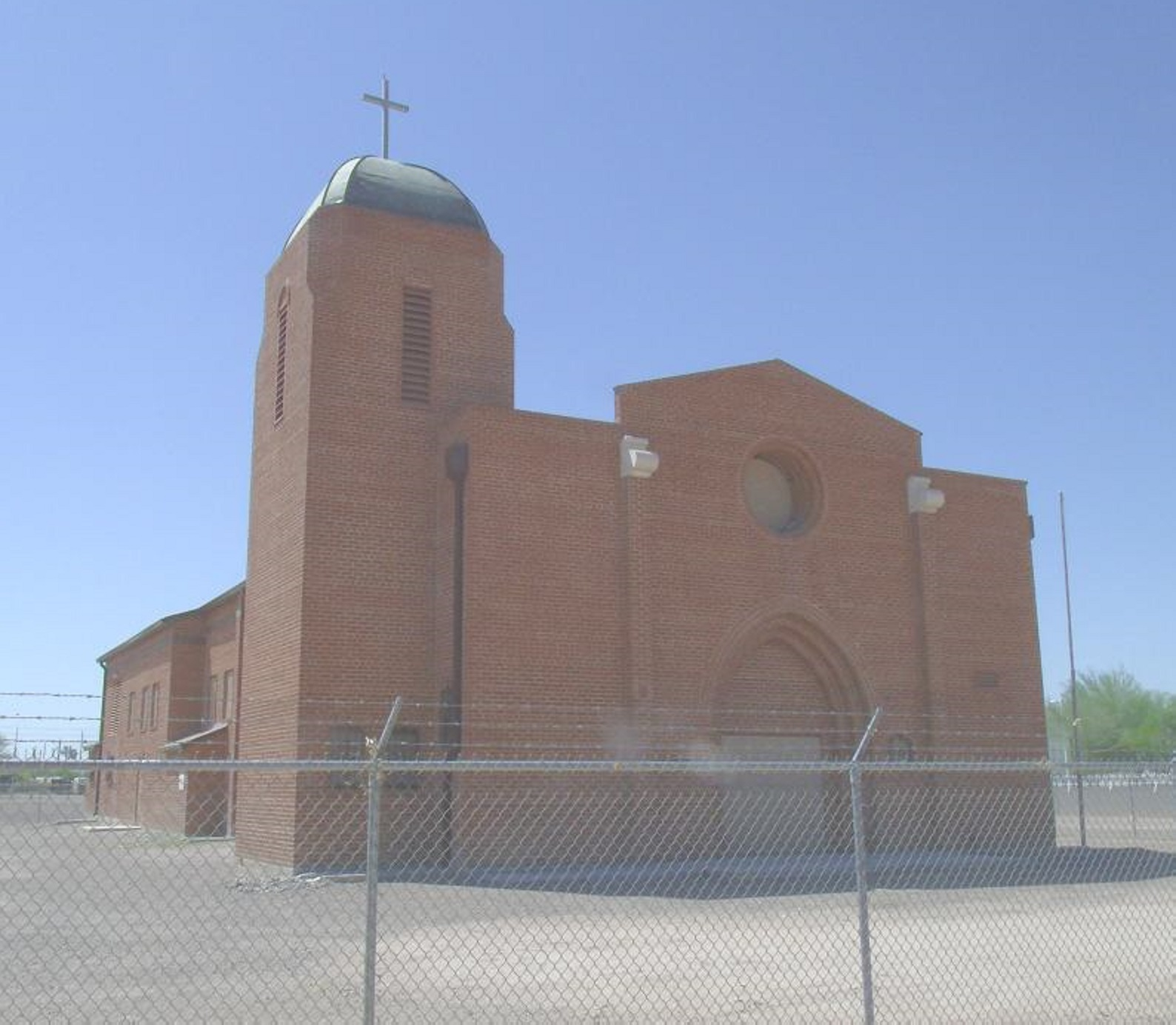
Sacred Heart Church in Phoenix, Arizona

The church was added to the National Register of Historic Places on March 20, 2012. Since 1986, its doors open once per year for Christmas Mass to the former neighborhood residents.
