= Diocese of Las Cruces =

Latin Catholic territory in New Mexico, US

Coordinates: 32°17′48″N 106°46′39″W

Diocese of Las Cruces Dioecesis Cruciensis Diócesis de Las Cruces
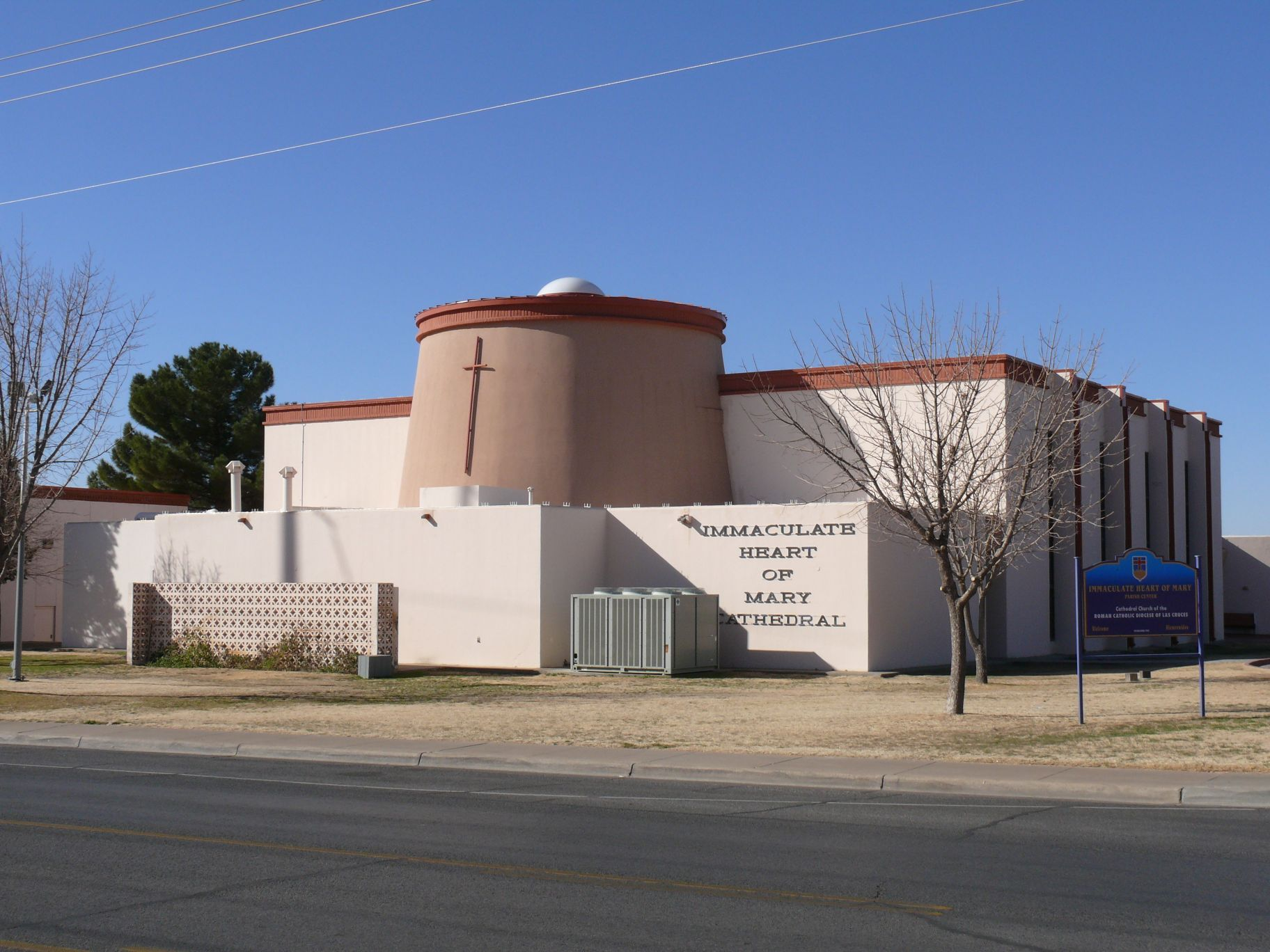
- Cathedral of the Immaculate Heart of Mary

Location
- Country: United States
- Territory: 10 counties across Southern New Mexico
- Ecclesiastical province: Santa Fe

Statistics
- Area: 44,483 sq mi (115,210 km^{2})
- Population: Total; Catholics: (as of 2010); 527,000; 139,322 (26.4%)
- Parishes: 45

Information
- Denomination: Catholic Church
- Sui iuris church: Latin Church
- Rite: Roman Rite
- Established: August 17, 1982 (44 years ago)
- Cathedral: Cathedral of the Immaculate Heart of Mary
- Patron saint: Saint Francis of Assisi

Current leadership
- Pope: Leo XIV
- Bishop: Peter Baldacchino
- Metropolitan Archbishop: John Charles Wester
- Bishops emeritus: Ricardo Ramirez

Map
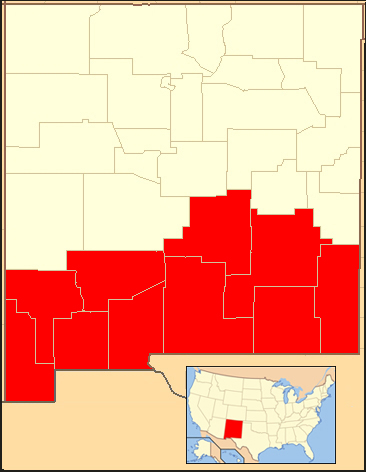

Website
- rcdlc.org

The Diocese of Las Cruces (Latin: Dioecesis Cruciensis, Spanish: Diócesis de Las Cruces) is a diocese of the Catholic Church in southern New Mexico in the United States. It is a suffragan diocese of the metropolitan Archdiocese of Santa Fe. The mother church is the Cathedral of the Immaculate Heart of Mary in Las Cruces. The bishop is Peter Baldacchino.

== Territory ==
The Diocese of Las Cruces comprises the following counties: Hidalgo Grant, Luna, Sierra, Doña Ana, Otero, Lincoln, Chaves, Eddy, and Lea.

As of 2023, the diocese had a Catholic population exceeding 234,000, served in 46 parishes and 40 missions.

== History ==
=== 1800 to 1982 ===
The first Catholic presence in present-day New Mexico, then part of the Spanish Empire, was in 1581 by Franciscan missionaries traveling north. Over the next 150 years, Spanish missionaries would periodically visit the region. After the Mexican War of Independence in 1821, when Mexico took control of the region, the Spanish priests were gradually replace by Mexican ones under the jurisdiction of Mexican dioceses. Visiting priests from Nuestra Señora de Guadalupe Church in El Paso, Texas, performed marriages, baptisms and other sacraments for the settlers. Nuestra Señora de la Candelaria Mission in Doña Ana was built in 1844.

In 1848, the area passed to the United States after the end of the Mexican-American War. The Catholic jurisdiction over the area switch to several apostolic vicariates, archdioceses and dioceses. The San Albino Basilica in Mesilla was established in 1851, with the first resident priest in the region. Santa Genoveva Parish was erected in La Cruces in 1859.

The first Catholic church in Tularosa, St. Francis de Paula, was established in 1869 to give thanks for the community surviving an attack by Apache raiders. St. Vincent de Paul Church was consecrated in Silver City in 1874.

=== 1982 to present ===
The Diocese of Las Cruces was erected by Pope John Paul II on August 17, 1982. Its territory was taken from the Archdiocese of Santa Fe and the Diocese of El Paso. The pope named Auxiliary Bishop Ricardo Ramírez from the Archdiocese of San Antonio as the first bishop of Las Cruces. Ramírez retired in 2013.

The second bishop of Las Cruces was Auxiliary Bishop Oscar Cantú of San Antonio, named by Pope Benedict XVI in July 2013. Cantú became bishop of San Jose in 2018. The next year, to replace Cantú in Las Cruces, Pope Francis named Auxiliary Bishop Peter Baldacchino of the Archdiocese of Miami.

New Mexico state Senator Joe Cervantes stated in July 2021 that he was denied communion at his church in Las Cruces. In response, the diocese said that Cervantes had been warned in advance that he would not receive communion due to his support of an abortions rights bill in the New Mexico Senate.

As of 2026, Baldacchino is the bishop of Las Cruces.

=== Sexual abuse ===
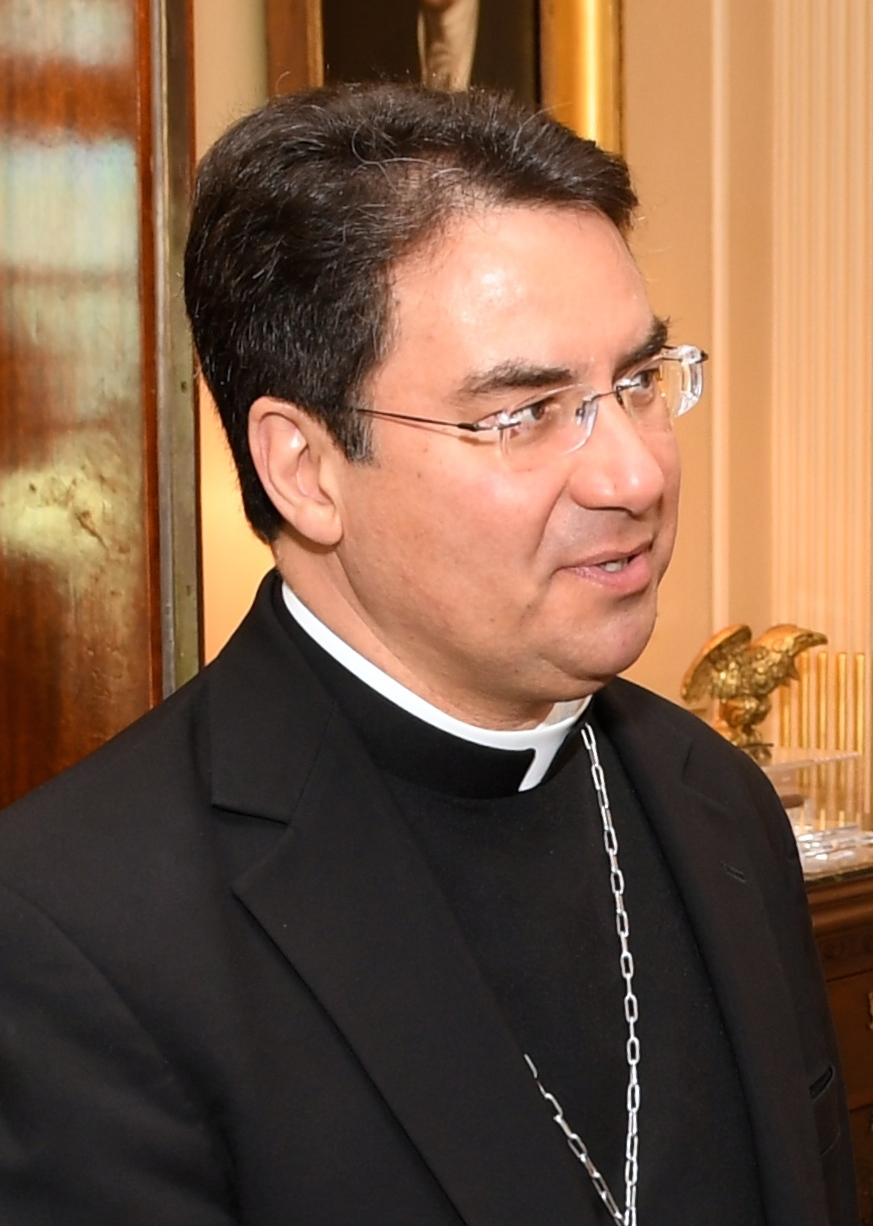
Bishop Cantú (2017)

In November 2018, the Diocese of Las Cruces released the names of 28 clergy who were credibly accused of committing acts of sex abuse while serving in the diocese. In February 2019, the diocese released the personnel files of all of the credibly accused clergy, adding 13 more clergy and a volunteer teacher to the credibly accused list.

In May 2020, the diocese was named in a sexual abuse lawsuit, accused of protecting David Holley after he sexually abused the plaintiff in the 1970s. Holley was a priest from the Diocese of Worcester living at the Servants of the Paraclete facility in Alamogordo at the time of the alleged crimes, being treated for sexually abusing minors in Massachusetts. Holley was convicted in New Mexico in 1993 of sexually abusing and raping eight boys was sentenced to 55 to 275 years in prison.

== Bishops ==
1. Ricardo Ramirez (1982–2013)
2. Oscar Cantú (2013–2018), appointed Bishop of San Jose
3. Peter Baldacchino (2019–present)
