= Albert Braun =

US Army chaplain and WWII prisoner of war (1889–1983)

Father Albert William Braun OFM (September 5, 1889 – March 6, 1983) was a Roman Catholic priest and teacher in the Southwest and the Pacific United States.

Braun served as a US Army chaplain in both World War I and World War II. During World War II he became a prisoner of war after the fall of Corregidor in the Philippines . He was a recipient of the Purple Heart, two Silver Stars and the Legion of Merit.

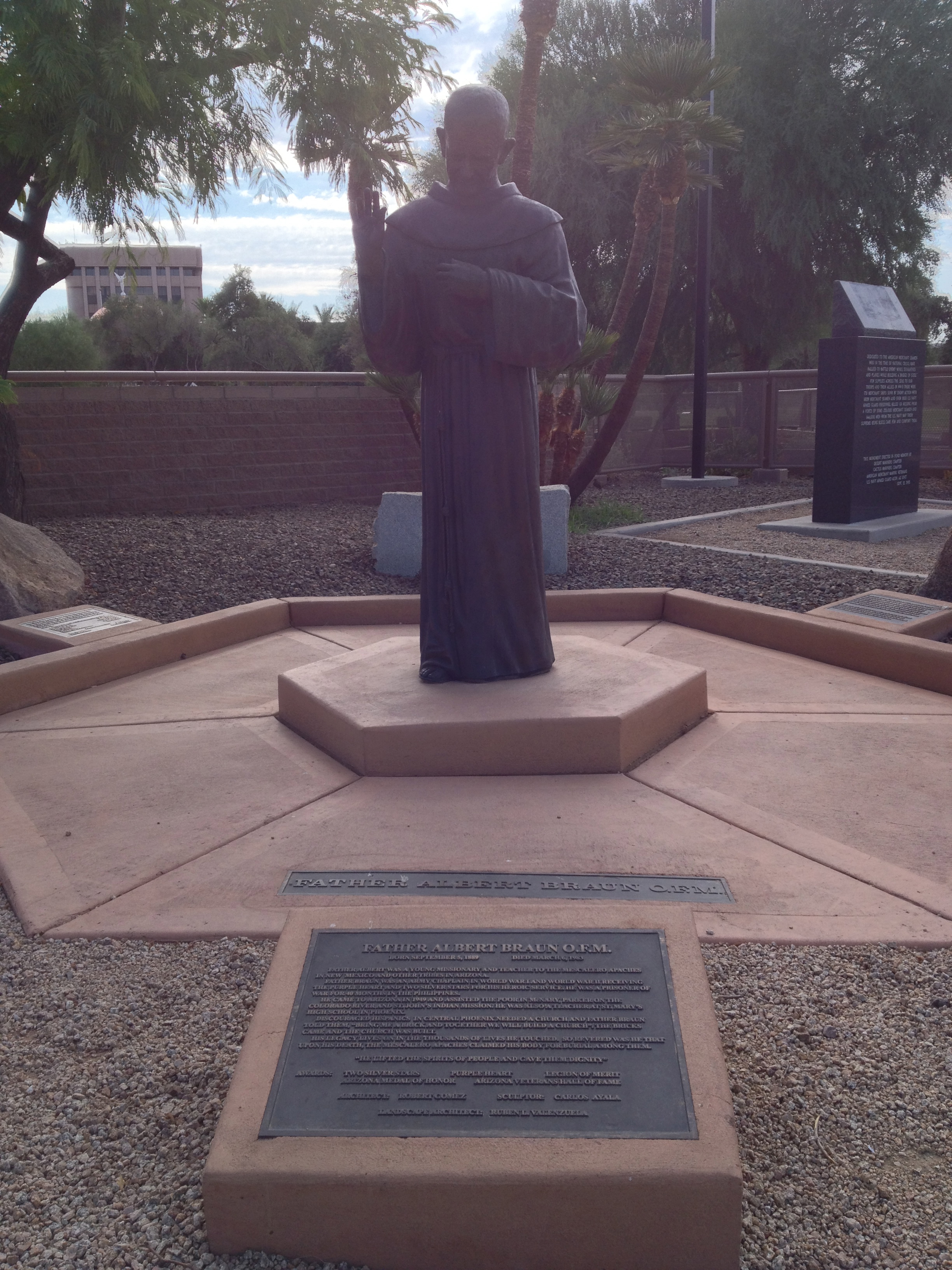
Father Albert Braun Memorial in Wesley Bolin Memorial Plaza, Phoenix, Arizona

== Early life ==
He was born John William Braun to German immigrants in Los Angeles, California. Braun was ordained in 1915 and his first assignment was to the Mescalero Apache Reservation in 1916.

== World War I ==
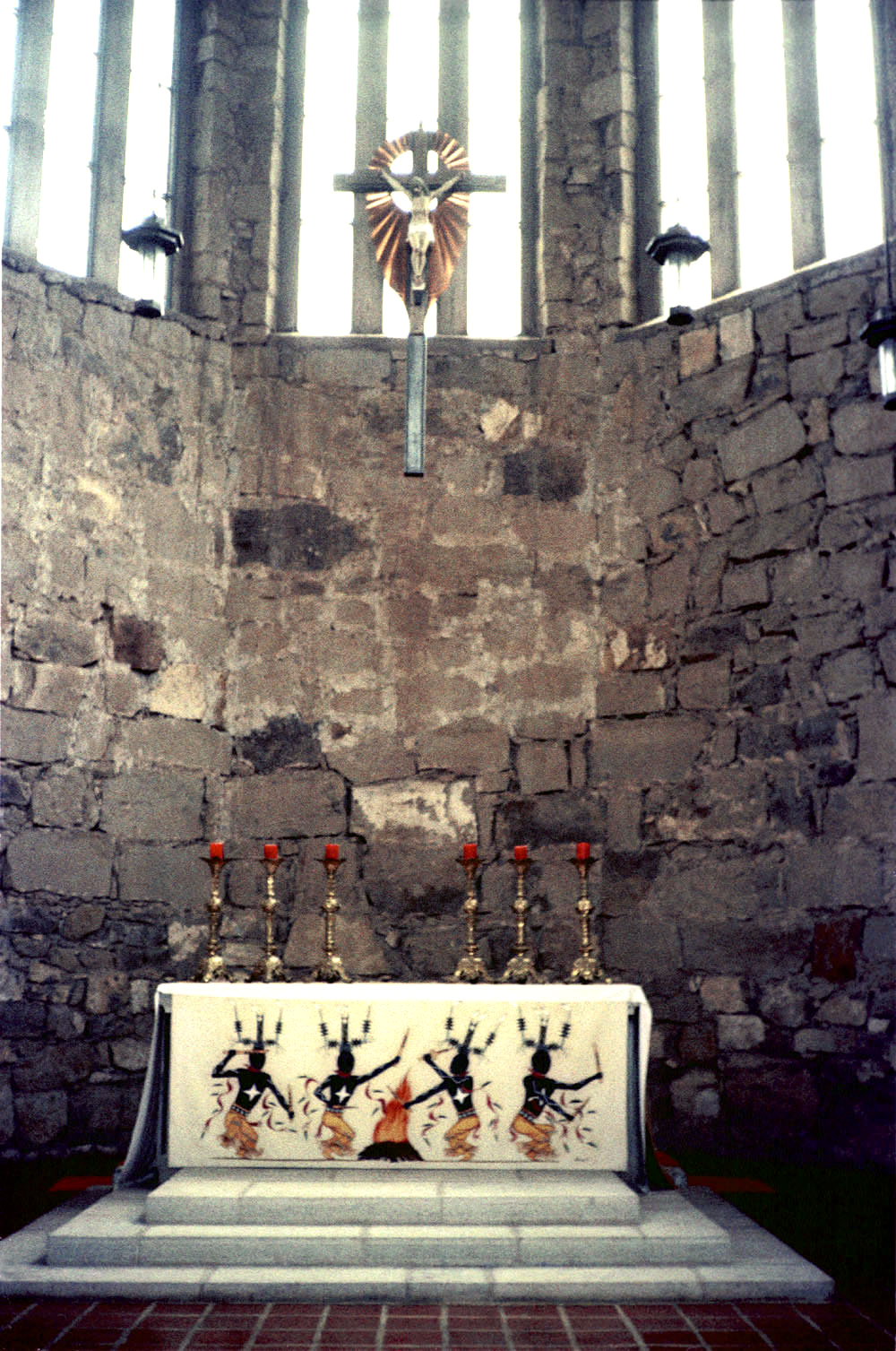
St. Joseph's Catholic Church, Mescalero, New Mexico, 1975

In June 1918, he was permitted by his superiors to enlist as a US Army chaplain at Fort Bliss, El Paso, Texas. He soon saw action with the 6th Infantry Division in one of the bloodiest World War I battles fought by American troops, the Meuse-Argonne Offensive. Instead of staying in safety at the rear, the unarmed chaplain went "over the top" with the first assault and suffered shrapnel wounds to his jaw. Despite his injuries he remained on the battlefield to minister to the wounded and to give last rites to the dying. For these actions, Braun received the Purple Heart.

Following the war, Braun helped to construct St. Joseph Apache Mission Church, finished in 1939.

== World War II ==
Braun received orders to report for duty on November 1, 1940, at Fort Sam Houston. He insisted on an overseas posting and was assigned as a chaplain with the 92nd Coast Artillery Regiment in the Philippines. In April 1941, he left for his assignment on the island of Corregidor in Manila Bay. Braun was on hand as Douglas MacArthur was evacuated from Corregidor. He gave the invocation for the inauguration of Philippine President Manuel Quezon on January 1, 1942, in Corregidor, and was present when General Jonathan M. Wainwright surrendered to the Japanese on May 7, 1942. It was Braun who, despite the threat of personal harm, gained permission from the Japanese officers to bury and cremate the dead and who supervised the work of removing the badly decayed bodies from the caves of Corregidor for proper disposal.

He suffered beatings, hunger, disease and the accompanying humiliations as a POW. He insisted on saying mass for the prisoners despite prohibitions against such service and eventually won concession for such activity.

Braun was liberated, after 40 months as a POW, at Camp Omori in Tokyo Bay on August 29, 1945. The emaciated priest who stood over six feet tall, had wasted from 195 pounds to 115 pounds and had had diphtheria, dysentery, pelagra and several bouts of malaria.

== Post-war life ==
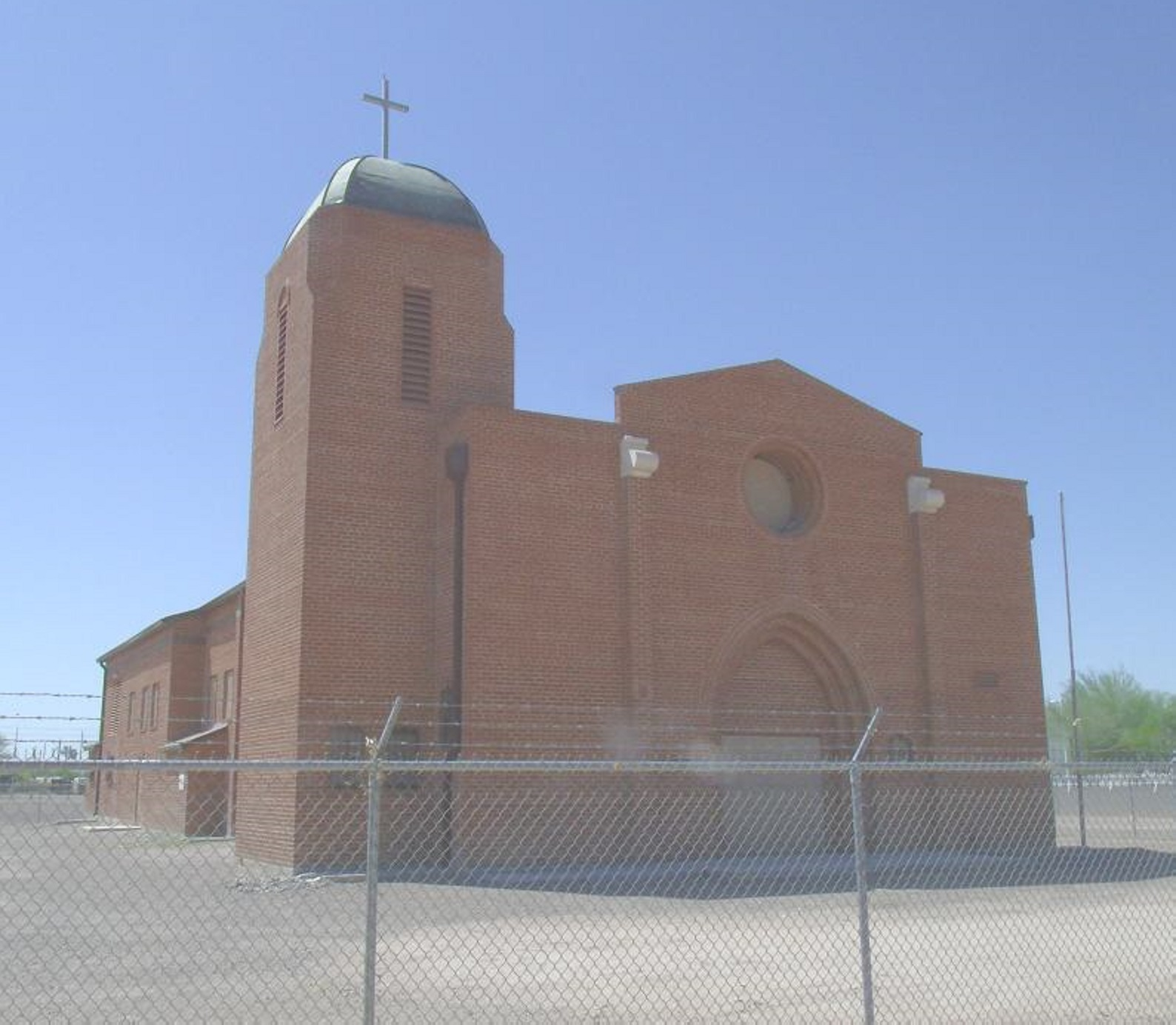
Sacred Heart Church, Phoenix

Due to injuries sustained as a POW, he could no longer serve as a missionary to the Mescalero Apaches. To aid in his recovery, he was sent by the Army to the Marshall Islands where he participated in Operation Sandstone. He then spent two years stationed in Hawaii.

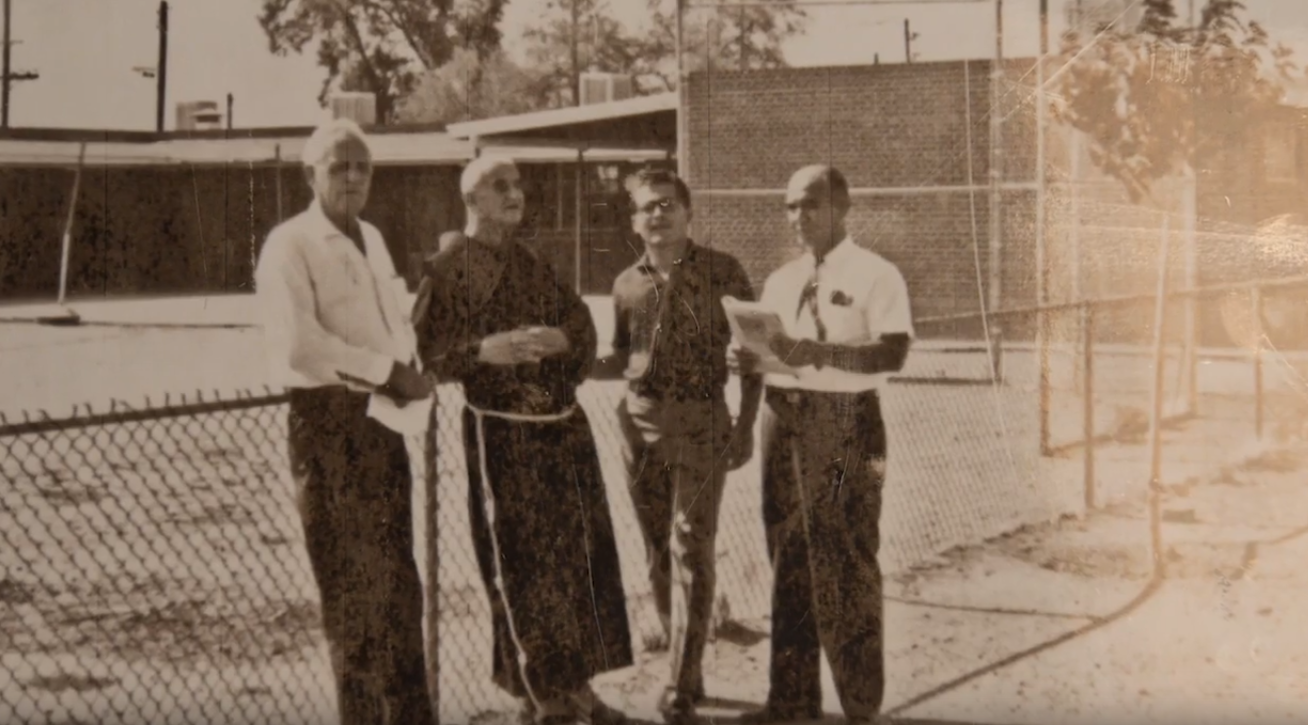
Fr. Albert Braun with Ramon Arvizu (left in picture), father of Abraham F. Arvizu, Pete Avila, and an unknown community member.

After the war, Fr. Albert came back to the Fruitvale Neighborhood of Oakland, where he requested from the Provincial to go back with the Mescalero. The Provincial requested he go to Phoenix. Fr. Al requested that he "be out with the people" and asked Fr. Victor, Pastor of St. Mary's, if there were any Spanish speaking parishes in the area. Fr. Victor responded that there were a group of 64 people down on 16th Street south of the railroad tracks, but told Fr. Al that they could go to the Basilica, a nearly two mile walk. After insistence, Fr. Al began serving the people near 16th Street, what was known at the time as the Golden Gate Barrio, and wrote the Provincial asking if he could live in the barrio for one year, after Fr. Victor denied the initial request. The Provincial granted Fr. Al to live in Golden Gate, where he spent every Monday, Tuesday, Wednesday, and Thursday visiting the families, noting that there were 8,000 Catholics in the barrio, not 64 Catholics as Fr. Victor had predicted. Around 1950, Victor Stinger donated a small lot at 17th and Sherman Streets in Phoenix, AZ to be used for Catholic mass for the residents of the Golden Gate Barrio and its surrounding barrios. The original structure was a ramada with a dirt floor and a palm thatch roof. Around 1952, Father Al began working within the community and requested that he remain in the barrios and not be moved around like "all the others" until he "completed his work". Father Al held his first mass under the ramada on August 10, 1952 and held mass there for two and one half years.

Father Al began acquiring land through political activism and brick through a local fundraising campaign within the Golden Gate Barrio whereas every single resident, including children, would each buy at least one red brick after the supply of adobe bricks was destroyed in a rain storm. With an $8,000 loan from the Bishop of Tucson, the rectory was completed on March 15, 1954. Two chapels were constructed on the southern and eastern sections of the parish: Saint Isabel (later named Saint John's) on 18th St. and Magnolia and Saint Mary Magdalene on 11th St. and Hilton with first mass dates being on March 18, 1954 and May 17, 1954, respectively. Only after these chapels were built did the construction of the main church begin, being blessed by Bishop Gercke on October 14, 1956. Construction of Santa Rita Hall began on November 20, 1956 to serve the residents of El Campito, and was completed in 1957. The altar, made of Italian marble, the roof, bell tower, and copper dome were added shortly after, completing construction. Understanding the importance of community cohesion, Father Al and his parishioners continued to address non-religious needs such as lighting, pavements, and sewage systems. A local juvenile court worker stated that after Father Al's arrival, "the number of juvenile cases dropped sharply as those persons under his influence began working together as family units and as a community". Father Al left the parish in 1962, but remain involved in the church at various capacities until his death in 1983. He is interred at the St. Joseph Mescalero Apache Mission in New Mexico at his request.

In 1965, he received the Arizona Medal of Honor and in 1979 the Arizona Veterans Hall of Fame award.

== Legacy ==
A memorial to Father Braun is located at Wesley Bolin Memorial Plaza in Phoenix, Arizona. He is often referred to as "The Hero Priest of Corregidor" by those that served with him.

The Historic Sacred Heart Church is the last remaining structure from the Golden Gate Barrio. The Golden Gate Barrio and its nearly 6,000 residents were forced out of their homes under eminent domain through the West Approach Land Acquisition in the 1970s and 1980s. The church was placed on the National Register of Historic Places by the US Department of Interior with the efforts of the Braun Sacred Heart Center Inc. in 2012. The lot the Sacred Heart Church sits on is owned by the City of Phoenix, Aviation Department.

== Bibliography ==
- Dorothy Emerson, Among the Mescalero Apache: The story of Father Albert Braun, 1973 ISBN 978-0-8165-0321-6.
