= Peter Baldacchino =

Maltese-born American prelate

His Excellency, The Most Reverend Peter Baldacchino
- Bishop of Las Cruces
- Archdiocese: Santa Fe
- Diocese: Las Cruces
- Appointed: May 15, 2019
- Installed: July 23, 2019
- Predecessor: Oscar Cantú
- Previous post: Auxiliary Bishop of Miami and Titular Bishop of Vatarba (2014-2019)

Orders
- Ordination: May 25, 1996 by Theodore Edgar McCarrick
- Consecration: March 19, 2014 by Thomas Gerard Wenski, Patrick Pinder, and Charles Henry Dufour

Personal details
- Born: December 5, 1960 (age 65) Sliema, Malta
- Education: University of Malta; Redemptorist Mater Seminary; Thomas Edison State College; Seton Hall University
- Motto: Ubi dominus ibidem laetitia (Where the Lord is, there is joy)

Styles of Peter Baldacchino
- Reference style: His Excellency; The Most Reverend
- Spoken style: Your Excellency
- Religious style: Bishop

Peter Baldacchino (born December 5, 1960) is a Maltese-born American Catholic prelate who has served as Bishop of Las Cruces since 2019. He previously served as an auxiliary bishop for the Archdiocese of Miami.

== Early life and education ==
Peter Baldacchino was born on December 5, 1960, in Sliema, Malta. He was educated at Mount Carmel College, now Saint Elias College. While he was a student at the University of Malta, he became interested in the Neocatechumenal Way, a Catholic formation movement. He earned a diploma in sciences from the University of Malta and several electrical installation licenses from the Umberto Calosso Trade School in Malta. After his graduation, Baldacchino worked for several years as technical manager at a Canada Dry bottling plant in Malta.

Baldacchino did not consider the priesthood until he attended the 1989 World Youth Day in Santiago de Compostela, Spain. He later decided to move to the United States to attend the Redemptoris Mater Seminary in Newark, New Jersey, that is operated by the Neocatechumenal Way.

Baldacchino received Bachelor of Arts degree from Thomas Edison State College in Trenton, New Jersey. While studying at the Immaculate Conception Seminary School of Theology at Seton Hall University in South Orange, New Jersey, he lived at the Neocatechumenal Way's Redemptoris Mater Missionary House of Formation in Kearny, New Jersey. Baldacchino received a Master of Divinity degree from Seton Hall.

== Career ==
=== Priesthood ===
Baldacchino was ordained a priest for the Archdiocese of Newark at the Cathedral Basilica of the Sacred Heart in Newark on May 25, 1996, by Archbishop Theodore McCarrick.

After his ordination, Baldacchino served as the parochial vicar at Our Lady of Mt. Carmel Parish in Ridgewood, New Jersey, from 1996 to 1999. He was assigned as the chancellor of the Mission Sui Iuris of Turks and Caicos in 1999. In 2002 he became the pastor of Our Lady of Providence Parish on Providenciales Island of Turks and Caicos Pope Benedict XVI named Baldacchino a chaplain of his holiness, with the title of monsignor.

=== Auxiliary Bishop of Miami ===
Pope Francis named Baldacchino as titular bishop of Vatarba and an auxiliary bishop of Miami on February 20, 2014. He was consecrated on March 19, 2014, by Archbishop Thomas Wenski. Archbishops Patrick Pinder and Charles Dufour were the principal co-consecrators.

=== Bishop of Las Cruces ===
On May 15, 2019, Pope Francis appointed Baldacchino as bishop of Las Cruces. He became the first prelate associated with the Neocatechumenal Way to head a diocese in the United States. He was installed on July 23, 2019.

Baldacchino holds dual citizenship in the United States and Malta. He is fluent in English, Italian, Maltese, Spanish and Creole.

== See also ==
- Catholic Church hierarchy
- Catholic Church in the United States
- Historical list of the Catholic bishops of the United States
- List of Catholic bishops of the United States
- Lists of patriarchs, archbishops, and bishops

Catholic Church titles
Preceded by Oscar Cantú	Bishop of Las Cruces; 2019–present	Succeeded by Incumbent
Preceded by –	Auxiliary Bishop of Miami; 2014–2019	Succeeded by –
