= Roman Catholic Diocese of Natchez =

Former Latin Catholic ecclesiastical jurisdiction in Mississippi, USA

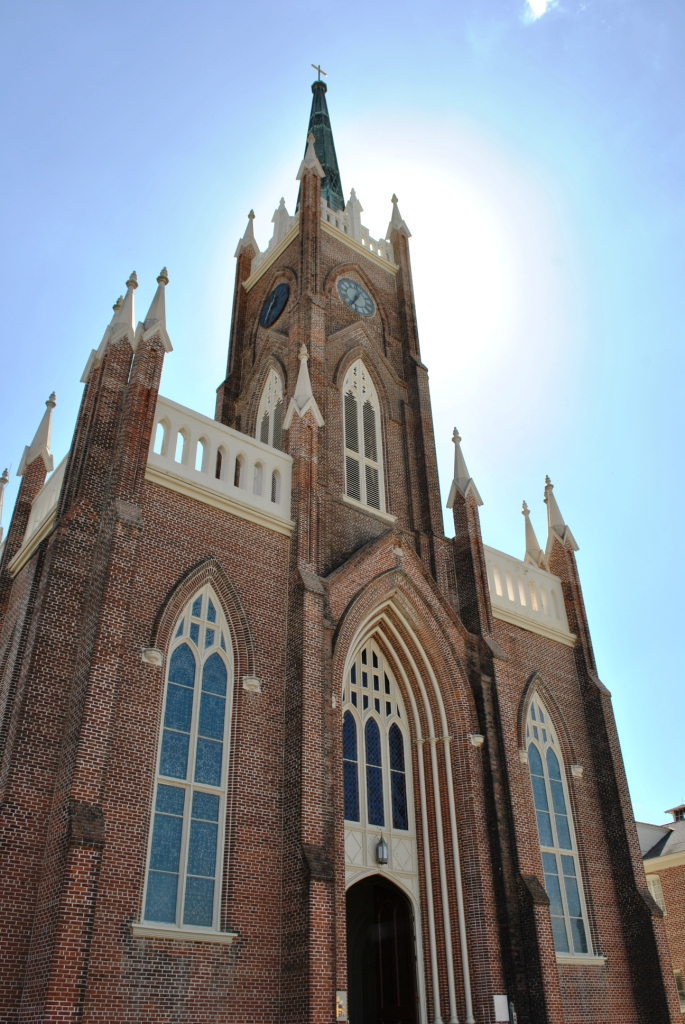
St. Mary Basilica, Cathedral of the former Diocese of Natchez

The Diocese of Natchez (Latin: Dioecesis Natchesium) was a Latin Church diocese of the Catholic Church; it was the predecessor of the Diocese of Jackson. It served all of Mississippi until the state was split into two dioceses, Jackson and Biloxi.

The former cathedral for the Diocese of Natchez in Natchez, Mississippi is now a minor basilica. The diocese was under the patronage of Our Lady of Sorrows.

== History ==
=== 1600 to 1837 ===
The first Catholic priests in present-day Mississippi were French Jesuit and Capuchin missionaries who accompanied the La Salle, Marquette, and d'Iberville expeditions in the 17th and 18th centuries. The French established Fort Rosalie near Natchez in 1716 and established the first parish in Mississippi.

By 1779, the Spanish were in charge in Florida. In 1787, three priests, McKenna, White, and Savage, arrived in Natchez from Spain and erected three missions in the vicinity. Spanish rule began in the area of Natchez in 1779 and in 1788, a Spanish wood-frame church dedicated to the Holy Savior (San Salvador) was built in the center of the city. Two of these missions disappeared after the Spanish Empire ceded the area to the new United States in 1821. San Salvador burned down in 1832.

The Mississippi Territory was originally under the jurisdiction of the Diocese of Louisiana and the Two Floridas. In 1826, Pope Leo XII moved the new state of Mississippi into the Vicariate Apostolic of Mississippi. The pope named Bishop Louis-Guillaume-Valentin DuBourg as the vicar apostolic.

=== 1837 to 1853 ===
The coat of arms of the former Diocese of Natchez

Pope Leo XIII converted the vicariate into the Diocese of Natchez on July 28, 1837, its territory covering all of Mississippi. The pope that same year appointed Thomas Heyden of the Diocese of Pittsburgh as the first bishop of the new diocese, but Heyden declined the post. Leo XIII then named Bishop Antoine Blanc of the Diocese of New Orleans to serve as a temporary administrator.

Three years later, in 1840, Leo XIII appointed John Chanche, president of St. Mary's College in Baltimore, as bishop of Natchez. Chanche sailed to New Orleans and then traveled by steamboat to Natchez, arriving in May 1841. On his arrival, he met the only priest in the new diocese, Brogard, there on a temporary assignment. Chanche began to contact Catholics in Mississippi and organize the new diocese. Three of his nieces opened the first Catholic school in Mississippi.

The Cathedral of the Sorrowful Heart of Mary was designed by Baltimore architect Robert Cary Long Jr., an alumnus of St. Mary's. Two years earlier, Long had designed for Chanche a steeple for the college's chapel. The cornerstone was laid in 1842. Chanche died in 1852, presumably of cholera, in Frederick, Maryland, while returning from the First Plenary Council of Baltimore. The diocese had by that time, 11 priests, 11 churches erected, and 13 attendant missions.

=== 1853 to 1881 ===
Bishop James Van de Velde was named as the second bishop of Natchez by Pope Pius IX in 1853. However, after only 23 months in office, Van de Velde died in 1855 of yellow fever. The next bishop of Natchez was Bishop William Elder, appointed by Pius IX in 1857. At the time he arrived in Natchez, the diocese had eleven missions (churches), nine priests and 10,000 Catholics.

After the occupation of Natchez in 1864 by the Union Army during the American Civil War, Elder refused an order from the military government to compel his parishioners to pray for the US president. Elder was then arrested, tried, convicted, and jailed briefly in Vidalia, Louisiana. Elder wrote an appeal from prison to President Abraham Lincoln. Elder explained that his refusal was not based on politics, but on the authority of the Catholic church to regulate its church services. The Federal Government ordered Elder's release from prison on August 12, 1864.

In 1878, a yellow fever epidemic broke out in Natchez. Ministering to the sick, Elder caught the disease. He survived but lost six diocesan priests. When he left the diocese, there were 41 churches, 25 priests, six religious houses for men, five convents, 13 parish schools and 12,500 Catholics. Elder was named coadjutor archbishop for the Archdiocese of Cincinnati in 1880 by Pope Leo XIII.

=== 1881 to 1924 ===
In 1881, Francis Janssens from the Diocese of Richmond was appointed the fourth bishop of the Diocese of Natchez by Leo XIII. During his tenure, Janssens completed construction on the Cathedral of St. Peter the Apostle in Jackson, Mississippi, which had commenced forty years earlier. The pope named him archbishop of the Archdiocese of New Orleans in 1888. St. Joseph School was founded in Greenville in 1888.

In 1889, Leo III appointed Thomas Heslin of the Archdiocese of St. Louis as the new bishop of Natchez. St. Mary's Church in Vicksburg, serving the African-American community, was founded in 1906, with half of the funding coming from Sister Katherine Drexel.

When Heslin died in 1911, Pope Pius X named John Gunn as bishop of Natchez. Upon Gunn's arrival, the diocese contained 75 churches, 46 priests, and 17,000 Catholics. He then began extensive pastoral visits to all the parishes and missions throughout the diocese, which covered nearly 47,000 square miles. Gunn received significant assistance from the Catholic Church Extension Society, and incorporated the diocese in 1918. He became known as the "Chapel Builder," and by the time of his death, there were 149 churches and over 31,000 Catholics in the diocese.

=== 1924 to 1977 ===
After Gunn died in 1924, Pope Pius XI appointed Richard Gerow of the Diocese of Mobile as the next bishop of Natchez. During his 43-year tenure, Gerow oversaw an extensive renovation of St. Mary's Cathedral, held biannual clerical conferences, and worked to established Confraternity of Christian Doctrine programs in every parish of the diocese. He moved the episcopal see of the diocese to Jackson in 1948. On December 18, 1956, the Vatican renamed the Diocese of Natchez to the Diocese of Natchez-Jackson.

In 1963, Gerow condemned the assassination of the American Civil Rights Movement activist Medgar Evers in Mississippi, saying, "We need frankly to admit that the guilt for the murder and the other instances of violence in our community tragically must be shared by all of us." The following year, he ordered Catholic elementary schools in the diocese to admit students to the first grade "without regard to race." In 1965, Gerow ordered the desegregation of all grades in Catholic schools to "bring our practice into full conformity with the teachings of Christ." Gerow retired in 1967.

The next bishop of Natchez-Jackson was Auxiliary Bishop Joseph Brunini, appointed by Pope Paul VI in 1967. He was the first native Mississippian to serve in that post. During his tenure, Brunini was an outspoken advocate of the Civil Rights Movement; he once declared, "We as religious leaders can't blame the politicians if we don't do our job first." He co-founded and served as the first president of the Mississippi Religious Leadership Conference.

On March 1, 1977, Paul VI split the Diocese of Natchez-Jackson into the Diocese of Jackson and the Diocese of Biloxi. The pope designated the Diocese of Natchez as a titular see.

== Bishops ==
=== Diocesan bishops ===
Prior to the erection of the Diocese of Natchez, Louis DuBourg served as the Vicar Apostolic of Mississippi from 1825 to 1826.

1. John J. Chanche 1840 – 1852
2. James Oliver Van de Velde, 1853 – 1855
3. William Henry Elder, 1857 – 1880, appointed Archbishop of Cincinnati in 1880
4. Francis Janssens, 1881 – 1888, appointed Archbishop of New Orleans in 1888
5. Thomas Heslin, 1889 – 1901
6. Thomas Heslin, 1889 – 1911
7. John Edward Gunn, S.M., 1911 – 1924
8. Richard Oliver Gerow, 1924 – 1967 (in 1956, the Diocese of Natchez was renamed the Diocese of Natchez-Jackson)

=== Titular bishops ===
1. Daniel Kucera 1977 – 1980
2. William H. Bullock 1980 – 1987
3. John Nolan 1987 – 1997
4. Timothy Dolan 2001 – 2002
5. Salvatore J. Cordileone 2002 – 2009
6. Eduardo Nevares 2010 – present

== See also ==
- Roman Catholic Diocese of Jackson
