= James Oliver Van de Velde =

Catholic bishop in the United States (1795–1855)

His Excellency, The Right Reverend James Oliver Van de Velde S.J
- Bishop of Natchez
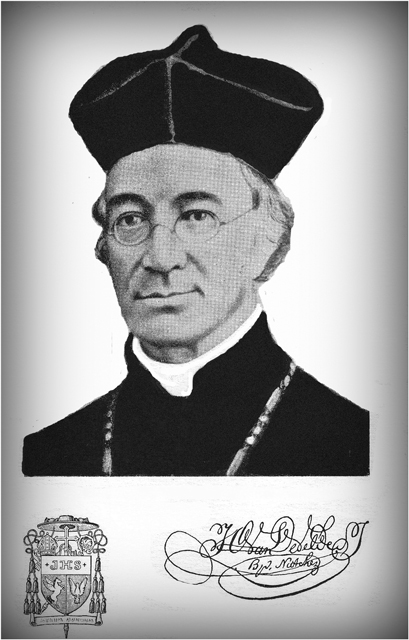
- Church: Roman Catholicism
- See: Diocese of Natchez
- In office: 1853 to 1855
- Predecessor: John J. Chanche
- Successor: William Henry Elder
- Previous posts: Bishop of Chicago (1849 to 1853); Jesuit Provincial and Vice Provincial (1843 to 1849); President of Saint Louis University (1840 to 1843)

Orders
- Ordination: September 25, 1827 by Ambrose Maréchal
- Consecration: February 11, 1849 by Peter Kenrick

Personal details
- Born: April 3, 1795 Lebbeke, Austrian Netherlands (now Belgium)
- Died: November 13, 1855 (aged 60) Natchez, Mississippi, US

Styles of James Oliver Van de Velde, SJ
- Reference style: The Right Reverend
- Spoken style: Your Excellency
- Religious style: His Excellency
- Posthumous style: none

James Oliver Van de Velde, SJ (April 3, 1795 – November 13, 1855) was a Belgian-born Catholic prelate who served as bishop of Natchez in Mississippi from 1853 to his death in 1855. He was a member of the Society of Jesus (Jesuits).

Van de Velde previously served as bishop of Chicago from 1849 and 1853. Prior to that, he was a provincial and vice provincial of the Society of Jesus from 1843 to 1849 and president of Saint Louis University from 1840 to 1843.

== Early life ==
=== Childhood ===
John Andrew James Oliver Benedict Rottheir Van de Velde was born on April 3, 1795, to a wealthy Catholic family in Lebbeke in the Austrian Netherlands (a Flemish town in present-day Belgium). He was tutored at an early age by a French priest living in the Van de Velde household, a refugee from the French Revolution. In 1810, at age 10, Van de Velde was sent to a boarding school in Ghent. He excelled academically and by age 18 was teaching French and Flemish to the younger students.

During the early 1800s, the Austrian Netherlands had fallen under the rule of the Napoleonic regime in France. However, by 1815 Napoleon had been defeated; Catholic Belgium was joined with Protestant Holland in the independent United Kingdom of the Netherlands. This put the Catholic subjects under the rule of William I of the Netherlands, who was antagonistic toward them. As a result, Van de Velde had been planning to emigrate to England or Italy to continue his studies. He started learning English and Italian.

However, the head of the Major Seminary of Mechelen at Mechelen in the kingdom persuaded Van de Velde to stay in the Netherlands and teach Latin, French, and Flemish at the seminary while studying religion. Van Velde was eventually able to also preach and write in English, German, Italian, and Spanish.

=== Education ===
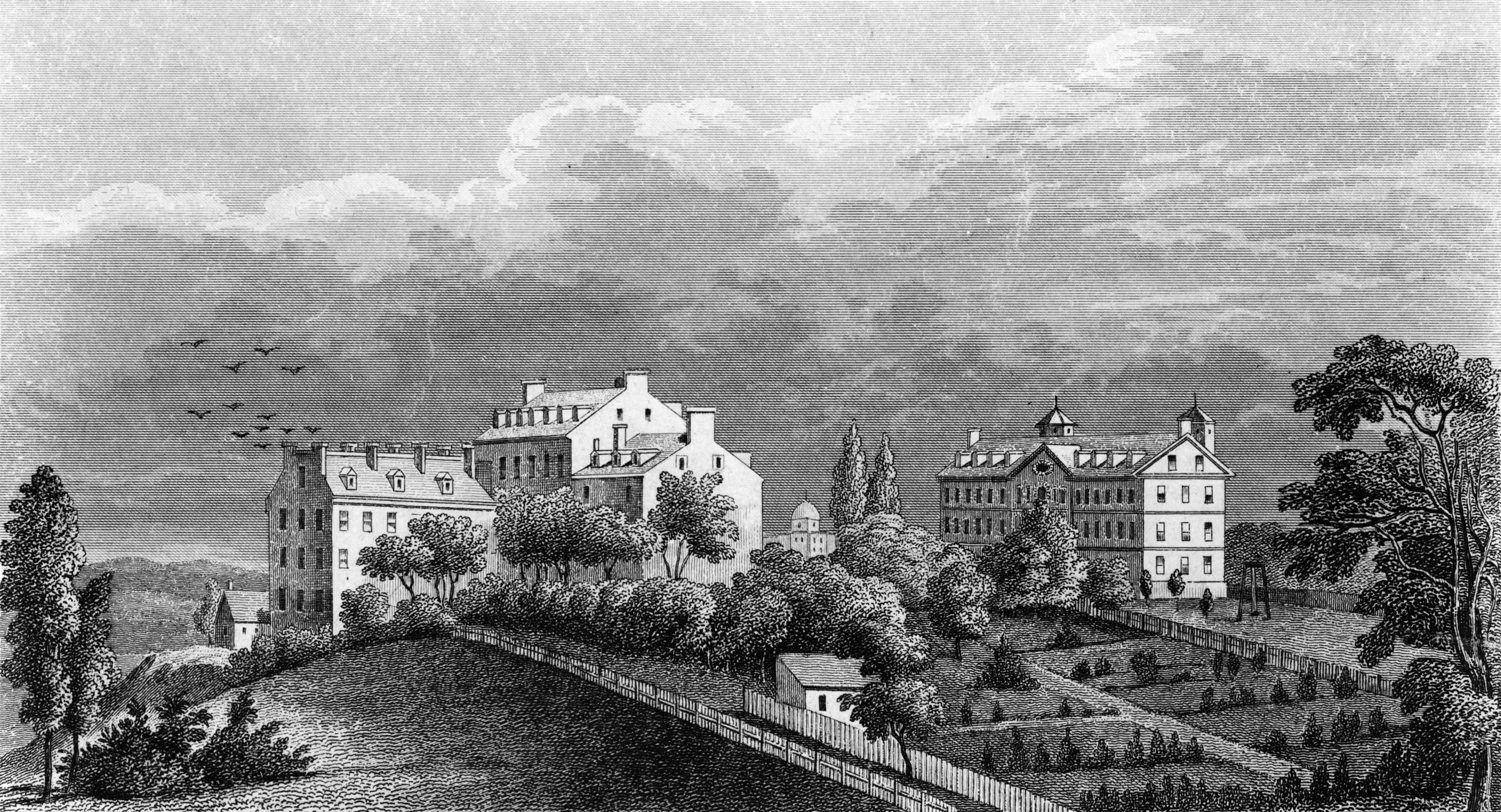
Georgetown University, Washington, D.C. (1850)

In 1815, Van de Velde entered the seminary at Mechelen. While teaching there, he met Reverend Charles Nerinckx. The priest was trying raise funds and recruit other priests for his struggling missions in the United States. He persuaded Van de Velde to accompany him there to finish his studies for the priesthood.

On May 16, 1817, Van de Velde sailed for Baltimore, Maryland, on the brig Mars. He experienced seasickness throughout the voyage and one of his blood vessels ruptured after he fell during a violent storm. When the ship reached Baltimore, the original plan was for Van de Velde to travel overland to Bardstown, Kentucky, to enter St. Thomas Seminary. However, after losing a large amount of blood due to his injury, Van de Velde was too weak to make the trip. He was transported to St. Mary's Seminary in Baltimore, which allowed him to recuperate there.

In 1818, as an alternative to St. Thomas Seminary, Nerinckx advised Van de Velde to enter the Jesuit novitiate at Georgetown College in Washington, D.C. After completing the novitiate in 1819, he stayed at Georgetown to continue his academic and theological studies for eight more years.

When Van de Velde entered the novitiate, he became the librarian for Georgetown College. When he started, the new library contained about 200 books. By 1831, when Van de Velde left Georgetown, it had 20,000 books.

While at the Seminary of Mechelen, Van de Velde had mentored a seminarian named Judocus Francis Van Assche. In 1820, Van Velde wrote a letter to Van Assche, urging him to completed his studies for the priesthood in the United States. Nerinckx delivered the letter to Van Assche during a fundraising trip to Europe. Van Assche decided to go and recruited eight other seminarians to accompany him.

Van Assche and his friends arrived in Washington in September 1821 and then entered the Jesuit seminary in White Marsh, Maryland, in October 1821. This group of Belgians would later become the core of the Jesuit mission effort in Missouri. The one letter written by Van de Velde brought nine men into the priesthood.

== Priesthood ==
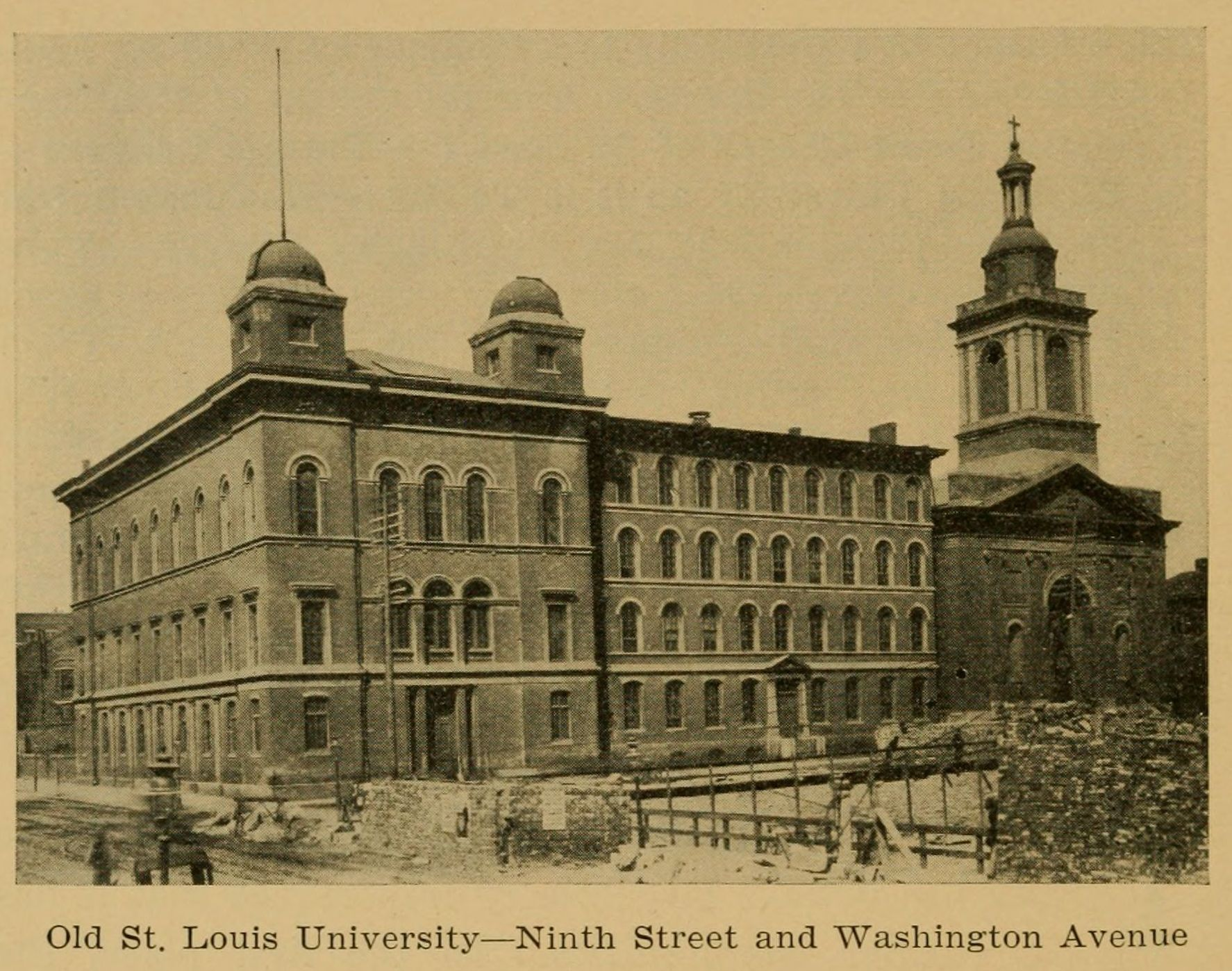
St. Louis University, St. Louis, Missouri, first campus (1910)

Van de Velde was ordained into the priesthood in Baltimore for the Jesuit Order on September 25, 1827, by Archbishop Ambrose Maréchal. After his ordination, the Jesuits kept Van de Velde at Georgetown to complete his education. They also assigned him to serve as chaplain at the Georgetown Visitation Preparatory School, a school for Catholic girls. In 1829, he was named pastor of the mission churches in Rockville and Rock Creek in Maryland.

In 1831, the Jesuits sent Van de Velde to St. Louis, Missouri, to join the faculty at Saint Louis College, their new institution of higher learning. While a professor there, he taught rhetoric and mathematics. When Saint Louis College became a university in 1833, Van de Velde was named as its vice president. Van de Velde took his final vows as a Jesuit in 1837, and in 1840 became president of Saint Louis University. During his tenure, he built a new building for the novitiate and improved the academic programs.

Van de Velde left the presidency of Saint Louis University in 1843 to serve as vice-provincial of the Jesuits. While serving in this post, he erected several churches and started mission churches among Native American tribes. He would later become the Jesuit provincial.

== Bishop of Chicago ==
Van de Velde was appointed bishop of Chicago on October 3, 1848, by Pope Pius IX. Van de Velde was consecrated on February 11, 1849, in the Church of St. Francis Xavier at Saint Louis University by Archbishop Peter Kenrick.

At that time, the Diocese of Chicago included the entire State of Illinois. After his consecration, Van de Velde traveled from St. Louis to Chicago, celebrating mass in Cahokia, Kaskaskia, and Quincy, Illinois, along the way. He preached in English, German, and French. Van de Velde also tried to visit locations in the diocese that had historical meaning for the Jesuit Order and the Catholic Church.During his first trip in Illinois, Van de Velde encounter many Catholic orphans. He brought 75 of them back to Chicago. Using his own money, along with contributions from Catholics and Protestants, he placed them in orphanages.

The Catholic population in Illinois consisted primarily of poor immigrants served by very few priests. When Van Velde visited the German Catholics in Springfield, Illinois, he learned that some of them had been unable to see a priest for four years. To minister to these Catholics outside of Chicago, Van de Velde spent many weeks traveling across the state. He would journey by "river packet, stage, carriage, 'mud-wagon', and towards the end, occasionally by railroad". He was sometimes forced to travel by horse and camp on the roadside. These trips, along with the tough winter climate, worsened Van de Velde's rheumatism and other health problems.

In 1849, a cholera epidemic swept through Chicago, leaving many children as orphans. That same year, Van de Veldt founded the Catholic Orphan Asylum in Chicago to take care of the Catholic orphans. The Protestant leaders of the city had opened a separate orphanage that same year for Protestant children.

=== Baltimore Conference ===
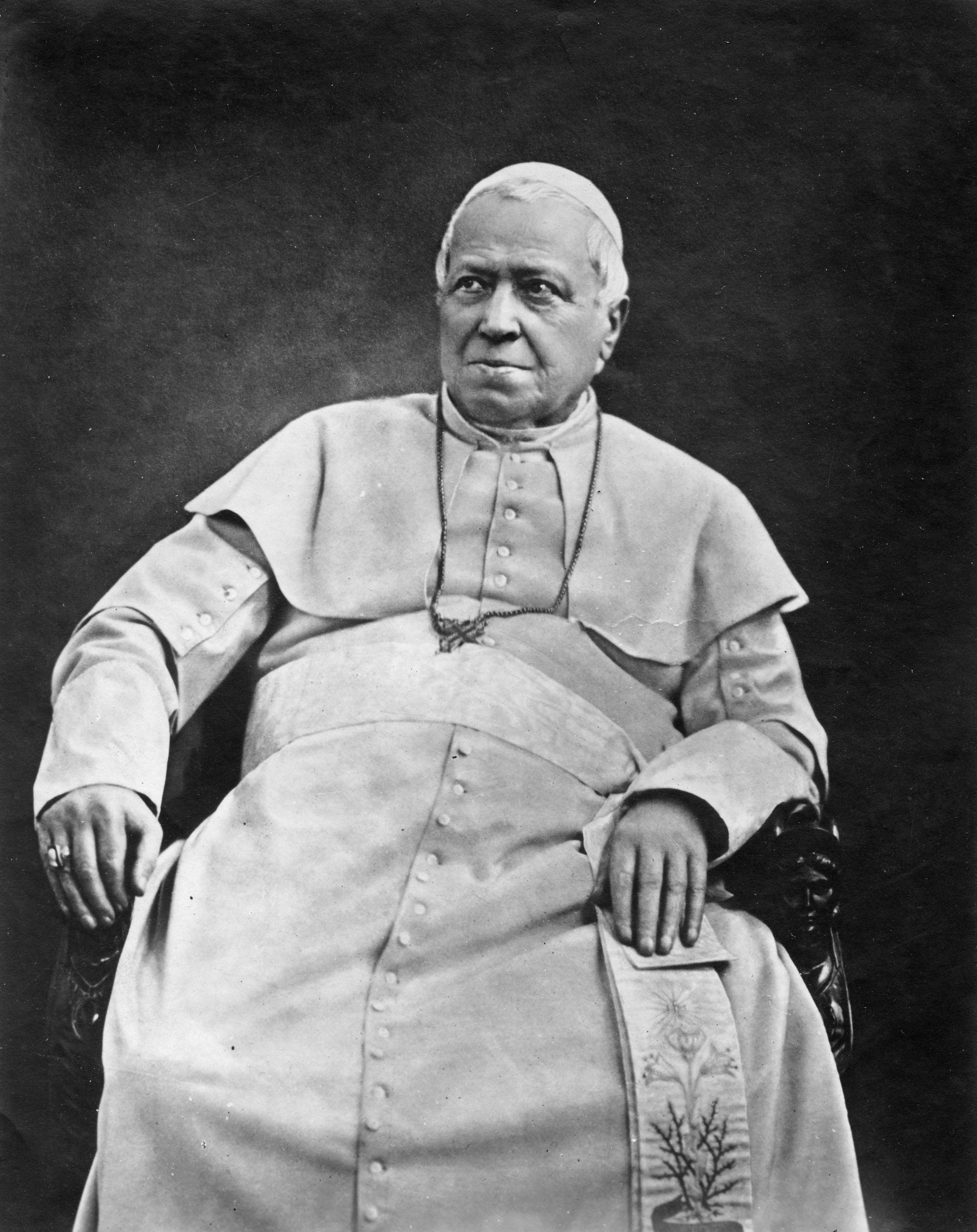
Pope Pius IX (1875)

In May 1852, Van de Velde arrived in Baltimore for the first plenary council, a meeting of all the bishops in the United States to discuss policies and rules for the American church. At the start of the council, Van de Velde told his fellow bishops that he was going to Rome after the meeting to seek permission from the pope to resign as bishop of Chicago. He said that his health prevented him from continuing the job. He had previously requested resignation by letter in Chicago, but had been refused.

In response, the bishops decided that the Vatican should separated Southern Illinois from the Diocese of Chicago into a new Diocese of Quincy. However, Van de Velde insisted that he still wanted to resign. When the council ended that spring, Van Velde brought all of their proposed decrees to Rome.

Arriving in Rome in June 1852, Van de Velde met twice with Pope Pius IX and reiterated his health problems. Van de Velde wanted to simply return to his former life as a Jesuit academic, but the pope said no. However, Pius IX agreed to transfer him at a later date to an American diocese in a warmer climate. Van de Velde then visited Belgium, France and Germany before sailing from Liverpool, England, for New York City in November 1852. He was soon back in Chicago.

Soon after his return to Chicago, Van de Velde fell ill. He was forced to spend ten days recuperating in Indiana at the monastery of the Fathers of the Holy Cross at the University of Notre Dame du Lac (now Notre Dame University).

During his tenure in Illinois, Van de Velde started 70 churches, contributing his own funds to many of them. He personally confirmed 3,600 Catholics. When the Vatican announced its 1853 decision to create the Diocese of Quincy in Southern Illinois, Van de Velde purchased a piece of property there for its new cathedral.

== Bishop of Natchez ==
On July 29, 1853, Pius IX appointed Van de Velde as bishop of Natchez. He arrived in Natchez, Mississippi, in November 1853 and was installed as bishop in December. At that time, the diocese had nine priests, 11 churches and one orphanage covering the entire State of Mississippi. As he had done in Illinois, Van de Velde immediately started traveling throughout the diocese visiting Catholic communities.

Van de Velde founded two schools in Natchez and purchased a property for a college. He began acquiring land for the construction of new churches and started repairing existing churches. He directed workers to gather exposed bones at the old Spanish cemetery and re-inter them a crypt under St. Mary Cathedral.

== Death and legacy ==
On October 23, 1855, Van de Velde slipped on the front steps of his residence and fractured his leg in two places. He soon developed an infection in his leg. During this period, Natchez was in the middle of a yellow fever epidemic and Van de Velde contracted the disease. Over the next three weeks, his condition deteriorated. Before his death, Van de Velde made a final confession and was administered the last rites.

Van de Velde died in Natchez on November 13, 1855, after five hours of paroxysms and sliding in and out of consciousness. He was 60 years old. His body was dressed in vestments with his eyes partially open and his casket displayed on a tilt, "so as to give the impression of being partially erect", according to a letter by a Jesuit priest. He was buried on November 14th, after a funeral mass celebrated at St. Mary's Cathedral by Archbishop Anthony Blanc.

== See also ==
- Roman Catholic Diocese of Jackson, formerly Diocese of Natchez
- Pierre-Jean De Smet, fellow Belgian-American Jesuit from Van de Velde's hometown; author of eulogistic letter
- Archdiocese of Chicago

== Episcopal succession ==
Catholic Church titles
Preceded by William Quarter	Bishop of Chicago; 1849–1853	Succeeded by Anthony O'Regan
Preceded by John Mary Joseph Chanche	Bishop of Natchez; 1853–1855	Succeeded by William Henry Elder
