= Joseph Bernard Brunini =

American prelate (1909–1996)

His Excellency, The Most Reverend Joseph Bernard Brunini
- Bishop of Jackson; Titular Bishop of Axomis
- Church: Roman Catholic Church
- Diocese: Jackson
- In office: 1977 to 1984
- Predecessor: Richard Oliver Gerow
- Successor: William Russell Houck
- Other post: Titular Bishop of Axomis
- Previous posts: Bishop of Natchez-Jackson (1967 to 1977); Auxiliary Bishop of Natchez-Jackson (1957 to 1967)

Orders
- Ordination: December 5, 1933 by Francesco Marchetti Selvaggiani
- Consecration: January 29, 1957 by Richard Oliver Gerow

Personal details
- Born: July 24, 1909 Vicksburg, Mississippi, US
- Died: January 7, 1996 (aged 86) Convent, Louisiana, US
- Education: Georgetown University; Pontifical Urbaniana University; Catholic University of America
- Motto: God and neighbor

Styles of Joseph Bernard Brunini
- Reference style: His Excellency; The Most Reverend
- Spoken style: Your Excellency
- Religious style: Bishop

Joseph Bernard Brunini (July 24, 1909 – January 7, 1996) was an American Catholic prelate who served as bishop of the Diocese of Natchez-Jackson and later the Diocese of Jackson in Mississippi from 1967 to 1984. He previously served as auxiliary bishop of Natchez-Jackson from 1957 to 1967.

== Biography ==
=== Early life ===
Joseph Brunini was born on July 24, 1909, in Vicksburg, Mississippi, the sixth child of John and Blanche (née Stein) Brunini. John Brunini was the son of Italian immigrants and worked as a lawyer, founding the law firm Brunini, Grantham, Grower & Hewes; Blanche Brunini was Jewish.

After attending St. Aloysius High School in Vicksburg, Joseph Brunini studied at Georgetown University in Washington, D.C., obtaining a Bachelor of Arts degree in 1930. He then furthered his studies in Rome at the Pontifical North American College and the Pontifical Urbaniana University, earning a Bachelor of Sacred Theology degree in 1931.

=== Priesthood ===
While in Rome, Brunini was ordained to the priesthood for the Diocese of Natchez by Cardinal Francesco Selvaggiani on December 5, 1933.

Following his return to the United States, the diocese assigned Brunini as a curate at St. Mary's Cathedral Parish in Natchez, Mississippi. He was later sent to Washington D.C to complete his graduate studies at the Catholic University of America, obtaining a Doctor of Canon Law degree in 1937.

Bishop Richard Oliver Gerow named him as chancellor of the diocese in 1941 and rector of St. Mary's Cathedral in 1943. The Vatican raised Brunini to the rank of privy chamberlain in 1944 and domestic prelate in 1948. The diocese assigned Brunini as pastor of St. Peter's Church in Jackson, Mississippi, in 1949. In 1951, Gerow promoted him to vicar general.

=== Auxiliary Bishop of Natchez-Jackson ===
On November 28, 1956, Brunini was appointed auxiliary bishop of Natchez-Jackson and titular bishop of Axomis by Pope Pius XII. He received his episcopal consecration at St. Peter's Church on January 29, 1957, from Gerow, with Bishops Charles Greco and John Morkovsky serving as co-consecrators. In addition to his episcopal duties, he continued to serve as vicar general and pastor of St. Peter's Cathedral.

=== Bishop of Natchez-Jackson and Jackson ===
Following Gerow's resignation as bishop of Natchez-Jackson, Pope Paul VI named Brunini as his successor on December 2, 1967. He was the first native Mississippian to serve in that post. During his tenure, he was an outspoken advocate of the American civil rights movement; he once declared, "We as religious leaders can't blame the politicians if we don't do our job first." He co-found and served as the first president of the Mississippi Religious Leadership Conference.

Paul VI transformed the Diocese of Natchez-Jackson into the Diocese of Jackson on March 1, 1977, with Brunini remaining as its bishop.

=== Retirement and death ===
Brunini retired as bishop of Jackson on January 24, 1984. He died while attending a conference in Convent, Louisiana, on January 7, 1996, at age 86.

== Episcopal succession ==
Catholic Church titles
Preceded by Richard Oliver Gerow	Bishop of Jackson; 1967–1984	Succeeded by William Russell Houck
