= Archbishop Elder =

Archbishop Elder may refer to:

- William Henry Elder, Archbishop of Cincinnati
- Elder High School, named for the archbishop
