= Joseph Nunzio Latino =

Catholic bishop (1937–2021)

His Excellency, The Most Reverend Joseph Nunzio Latino
- Bishop of Jackson
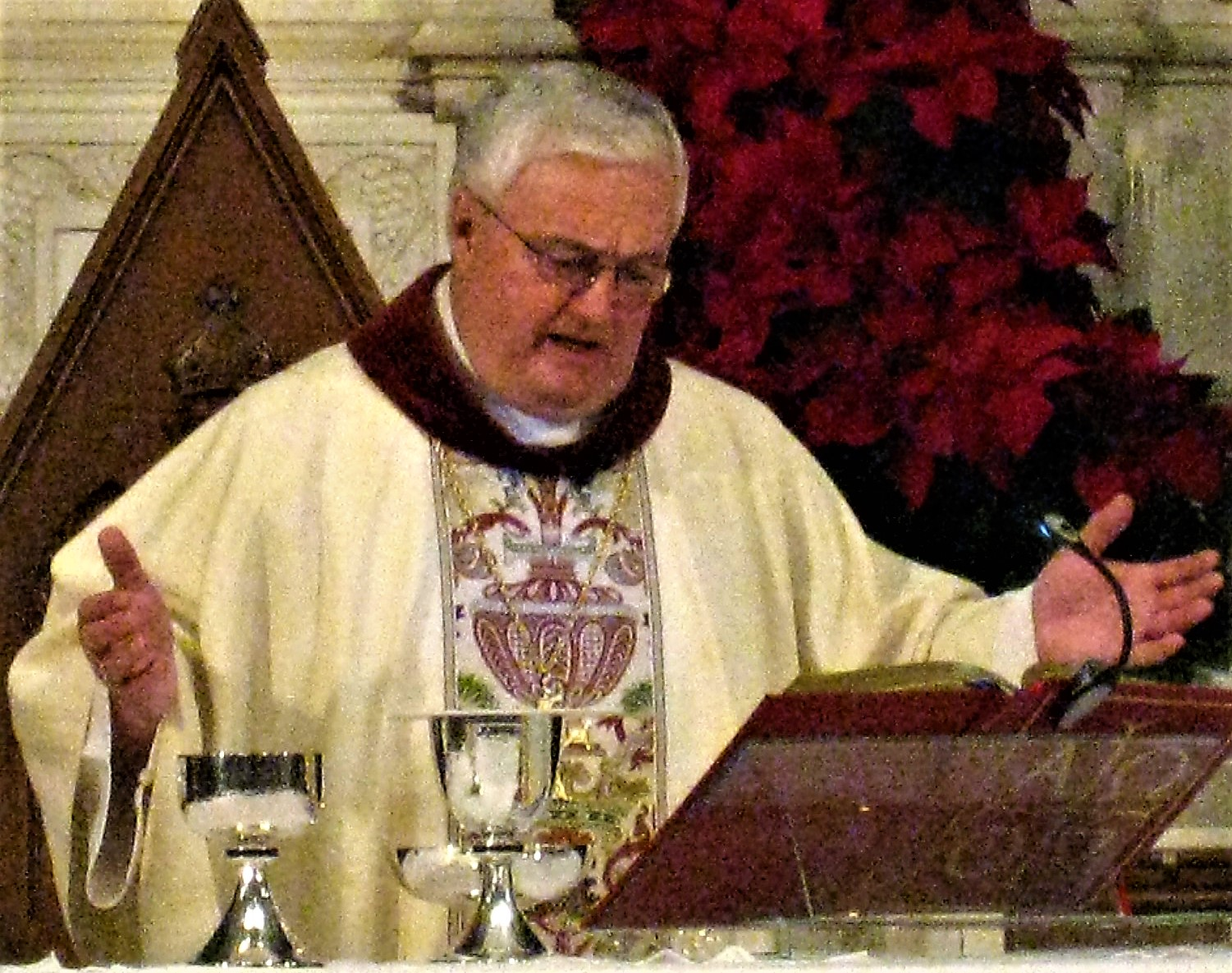
- Bishop Latino celebrating Midnight Mass in 2008
- Diocese: Jackson
- Appointed: January 3, 2003
- Installed: March 7, 2003
- Term ended: December 12, 2013
- Predecessor: William Russell Houck
- Successor: Joseph R. Kopacz

Orders
- Ordination: May 25, 1963 by John Cody
- Consecration: March 7, 2003 by Oscar Hugh Lipscomb, John Favalora, and William Russell Houck

Personal details
- Born: October 21, 1937 New Orleans, Louisiana, US
- Died: May 28, 2021 (aged 83) Jackson, Mississippi, US
- Motto: Ut unum sint "That all may be one"

Styles of Joseph Nunzio Latino
- Reference style: His Excellency; The Most Reverend
- Spoken style: Your Excellency
- Religious style: Bishop

Joseph Nunzio Latino (October 21, 1937 – May 28, 2021) was an American Catholic prelate who served as bishop of Jackson in Mississippi from 2003 to 2013.

== Early life ==
Joseph Latino was born on October 21, 1937, in New Orleans, Louisiana. He attended St. Joseph Seminary College in Covington, Louisiana, and Notre Dame Seminary in New Orleans.

== Priesthood ==
Latino was ordained to the priesthood at St. Louis Cathedral in New Orleans for the Archdiocese of New Orleans by Archbishop John Cody on May 25, 1963.

After his ordination, the archdiocese assigned Latino as an associate pastor at the St. Francis de Sales in Houma, Louisiana, then part of the archdiocese. He was assigned in 1968 to St. John Prep Seminary in New Orleans as a teacher and spiritual director, serving there for one year. In 1969, Latino was reassigned to St. Philip the Apostle Parish in the Desire Projects in New Orleans. He became pastor of St. Bernadette Parish in Houma in 1972.

In 1977, Pope John Paul II erected the Diocese of Houma-Thibodaux out of the Archdiocese of New Orleans. At that time, Latino was incardinated, or transferred to the new diocese. During the intervening years, he served as vocation director. The Vatican elevated Latino to the rank of prelate of honor in 1983. In 1987, he was named rector of what was now the Cathedral of St. Francis de Sales in Houma. He later appointed as vicar general and chancellor of the diocese. After Bishop Michael Jarrell left the diocese, Latino was elected by the consultors as the apostolic administrator.

== Bishop of Jackson ==
Latino was appointed by John Paul II as the 10th bishop of Jackson on January 3, 2003. He was consecrated at the Cathedral of Saint Peter the Apostle in Jackson, Mississippi, by Archbishop Oscar Lipscomb on March 7, 2003.

Pope Francis accepted the resignation of Latino as bishop of Jackson on December 12, 2013. Joseph Latino died on May 28, 2021, in Jackson, Mississippi.

== Coat of arms ==
Overview

The episcopal heraldic achievement, of bishop's coat of arms, is composed of a shield, with its charges (symbols), a motto scroll and the external ornaments. The shield, which is the central most important feature of any heraldic device, is described (blazoned) in archaic 12th century terms, and this description is oriented as if being given by the bearer with the shield worn on the arm.: the terms dexter and sinister are thus the reverse of what they are as seen from the front.

Arms

By heraldic tradition, the arms of the bishop of a diocese, called the "ordinary" are joined to the arms of his jurisdiction, seen in the dexter impalement (left side) of the shield. In this case, these arms of the Diocese of Jackson. These arms are composed of a golden (yellow) field on which is displayed a red cross "potent." When the City of Jackson was established the second See City for the Diocese of Natchez-Jackson in 1957, the cross that had been used in the arms of Natchez was incorporated into the new design. In 1977 when the diocese was renamed for the new, singular See City of Jackson the cross with a cross arm on each arm was retained to reflect the heritage of the Catholic Church in this portion of the State of Mississippi. Below the cross are wavy blue and silver (white) bars to represent the waters of the Mississippi River.

For his personal arms, seen in the sinister impalement (right side) of the shield, Latino adopted a design reflecting his life as a priest of the Diocese of Houma-Thibodaux. The design is a saltire with gold and red vertical bars on the top and bottom and silver fields on either side, the ancient arms of the Kingdom of Sicily, to reflect Latino's Sicilian heritage. In the silver fields on either side of the design the black displayed eagles of the Sicilian arms have been replaced by a blue fleur-de-lis and a blue magnolia blossom to reflect Latino's birthplace of New Orleans and the surrounding region. In the base of the gold bars from the upper portion have been replaced by a golden carpenter's square, issuant from the sides, to honor the bishop's baptismal patron, St. Joseph. This arrangement is used in the arms of the Diocese of Houma-Thibodaux where Latino was serving as vicar general when he became bishop of Jackson.

Motto

Latino's motto was "ut unum sini" ("That all may be one)", from St. John's Gospel (John 17:11).

External

The device is completed with the external ornaments which are the processional cross, which is placed in back of the shield and which extends above and below the shield, and a pontifical hat, called a "galero", with its six tassels, in three rows, on either side of the shield, all green. These are the heraldic insignia of the prelate of the rank of bishop by instruction of The Holy See of March 31, 1969.

== See also ==
- Catholic Church hierarchy
- Catholic Church in the United States
- Historical list of the Catholic bishops of the United States
- List of Catholic bishops of the United States
- Lists of patriarchs, archbishops, and bishops

== Episcopal succession ==
Catholic Church titles
Preceded by William Russell Houck	Bishop of Jackson; 2003–2013	Succeeded by Joseph R. Kopacz
