= Diocese of Jackson =

Latin Catholic jurisdiction in the US

Coordinates: 32°17′56″N 90°11′05″W

Diocese of Jackson Dioecesis Jacksoniensis
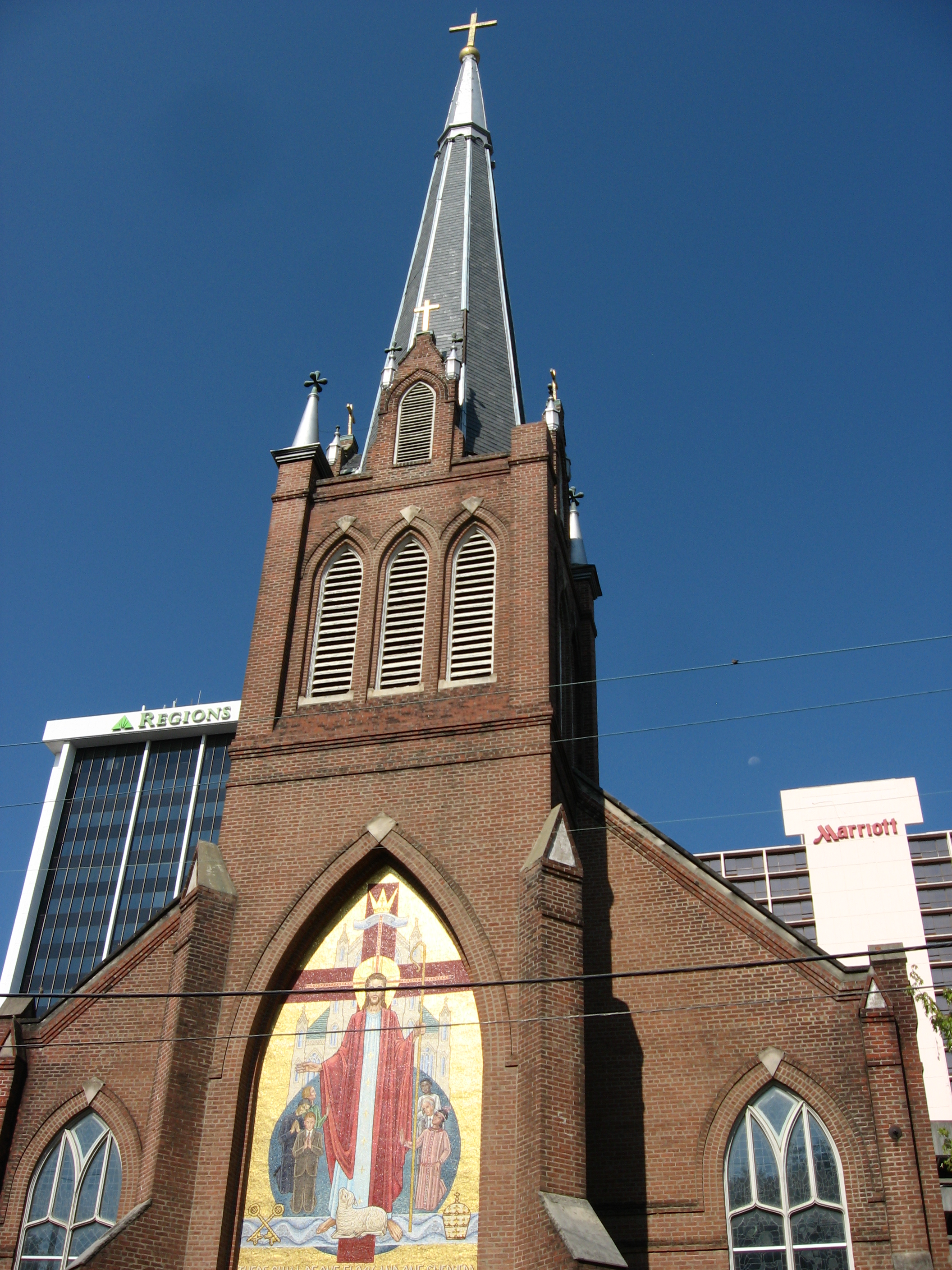
- Cathedral of St. Peter

- Coat of Arms

Location
- Country: United States
- Territory: Northern and central Mississippi (65 counties)
- Ecclesiastical province: Mobile

Statistics
- Area: 37,643 sq mi (97,490 km^{2})
- Population: Total; Catholics: (as of 2013); 2,219,000; 52,900 (2.4%)
- Parishes: 74

Information
- Denomination: Catholic Church
- Sui iuris church: Latin Church
- Rite: Roman Rite
- Established: July 28, 1837 (188 years ago)
- Cathedral: Cathedral of St. Peter the Apostle
- Patron saint: St. Peter the Apostle

Current leadership
- Pope: Leo XIV
- Bishop: Joseph Kopacz
- Metropolitan Archbishop: Mark S. Rivituso
- Vicar General: Lincoln Dall
- Judicial Vicar: Jeffrey Waldrep

Map
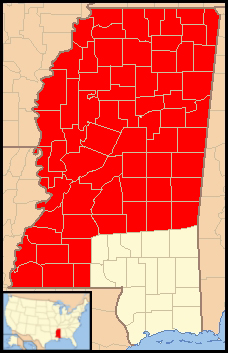

Website
- jacksondiocese.org

Coat of arms of the former Diocese of Natchez (1873–1956, coat of arms first used 1911).

The Diocese of Jackson is a Latin Church diocese in Mississippi in the United States. Its ecclesiastical jurisdiction includes the northern and central parts of the state, an area of 97,458 square kilometers (37,629 sq mi). A suffragan diocese of the Archdiocese of Mobile, it is the largest diocese, by area, east of the Mississippi River. The bishop is Joseph Kopacz.

== History ==
=== 1600 to 1837 ===
During the 16th century, the coastal area of Mississippi became part of the French colony of New France, with missionaries and European settlers arriving over the next 50 years. The northern region of Mississippi saw traders from the English colonies along the Atlantic coast.

The first Catholic priests in Mississippi were French Jesuit and Capuchin missionaries who accompanied the La Salle, Marquette, and d'Iberville expeditions to Mississippi in the 17th and 18th centuries. With the end of the French and Indian War in 1763, Great Britain took over the French colonies in along the Gulf Coast and west of the Mississippi River.

In 1779, during the American Revolution, Spain seized Biloxi and Natchez from Spain.In 1787, three priests, McKenna, White, and Savage, arrived in Natchez from Spain and erected three missions in the vicinity. In 1793, the Vatican placed all of the Spanish colonies in North America, including Mississippi, under the jurisdiction of the Diocese of Louisiana and the Two Floridas.

By 1796, Spain had effected ceded northern Mississippi to the United States. It lost control of the Gulf Coast region in 1810 when a group of America militia seized Mobile and other cities along the coast. The Spanish missions in Mississippi were abandoned soon after the takeover.

In 1826, Pope Leo XII moved the few Catholics in the new state of Mississippi into the Vicariate Apostolic of Mississippi. The pope named Bishop Louis-Guillaume-Valentin DuBourg as the vicar apostolic.

=== 1837 to 1860 ===
In 1837, Pope Gregory XVI elevated the Vicariate Apostolic of Mississippi to the Diocese of Natchez, encompassing all of Mississippi. He named John Chanche, president of St. Mary's College in Baltimore, as the first bishop of Natchez in 1840. At his arrival in Mississippi, Chanche found one priest in the diocese, Brogard, who was there only temporarily. Chanche set to work building a diocesan infrastructure. The first Catholic church in Vicksburg, St. Paul's, was built in 1841.

In 1842, Chanche laid the cornerstone of the Cathedral of Our Lady of Sorrows in Natchez, designed by Robert Long Jr. After the Vatican transferred the diocesan see to Jackson, this became St. Mary's Basilica. In 1847 the Sisters of Charity of Emmitsburg, Maryland, came to Natchez and established Saint Mary's Orphanage. During his tenure as bishop, Chanche built 11 churches, with a team of 11 priests and 13 attendant missions. Chanche died in 1853.

Bishop James Van de Velde was named as the second bishop of Natchez by Pope Pius IX in 1853. However, after only 23 months in office, Van de Velde died in 1855 of yellow fever. The next bishop of Natchez was Bishop William Elder, appointed by Pius IX in 1857. At the time he arrived in Natchez, the diocese had eleven missions (churches), nine priests and 10,000 Catholics.

=== 1860 to 1900 ===
In 1864, during the American Civil War, Natchez was captured by the Union Army. The military government ordered Elder to compel his parishioners to pray for US president Abraham Lincoln. After refusing the order Elder was then arrested, tried, convicted, and jailed briefly in Vidalia, Louisiana. Elder wrote an appeal from prison to Lincoln. Elder explained that his refusal was not based on politics, but on the authority of the Catholic church to regulate its church services. Lincoln ordered Elder's release from prison on August 12, 1864.

In 1878, a yellow fever epidemic broke out in Natchez. Ministering to the sick, Elder caught the disease. He survived but lost six diocesan priests. When he left the diocese, there were 41 churches, 25 priests, six religious houses for men, five convents, 13 parish schools and 12,500 Catholics. Elder was named coadjutor archbishop for the Archdiocese of Cincinnati in 1880 by Pope Leo XIII.

In 1881, Francis Janssens from the Diocese of Richmond was appointed the fourth bishop of the Diocese of Natchez by Leo XIII. During his tenure, Janssens completed construction on the Cathedral of St. Peter the Apostle in Jackson, Mississippi, which had commenced forty years earlier. The pope named him archbishop of the Archdiocese of New Orleans in 1888. St. Joseph School was founded in Greenville in 1888.

In 1889, Leo III appointed Thomas Heslin of the Archdiocese of St. Louis as the new bishop of Natchez. St. Mary's Church in Vicksburg, serving the African-American community, was founded in 1906, with half of the funding coming from Sister Katherine Drexel.

=== 1900 to 1960 ===
When Heslin died in 1911, Pope Pius X named John Gunn as bishop of Natchez. Upon Gunn's arrival, the diocese contained 75 churches, 46 priests, and 17,000 Catholics. He then began extensive pastoral visits to all the parishes and missions throughout the diocese, which covered nearly 47,000 square miles. Gunn received significant assistance from the Catholic Church Extension Society in Chicago and incorporated the diocese in 1918. He became known as the "Chapel Builder"; by the time of Gunn's death, the diocese had grown to 149 churches and over 31,000 Catholics.

After Gunn died in 1924, Pope Pius XI appointed Richard Gerow of the Diocese of Mobile as the next bishop of Natchez. During his 43-year tenure, Gerow oversaw an extensive renovation of St. Mary's Cathedral, held biannual clerical conferences, and worked to established Confraternity of Christian Doctrine programs in every parish of the diocese. He moved the episcopal see of the diocese to Jackson in 1948. On December 18, 1956, the Vatican renamed the Diocese of Natchez as the Diocese of Natchez-Jackson.

=== 1960 to 1980 ===
In 1963, Gerow condemned the assassination of civil rights activist Medgar Evers in Mound Bayou, saying, "We need frankly to admit that the guilt for the murder and the other instances of violence in our community tragically must be shared by all of us." The following year, Gerow ordered Catholic primary schools in the diocese to admit students to the first grade "without regard to race." In 1965, Gerow ordered the desegregation of all grades in Catholic schools, in order to "bring our practice into full conformity with the teachings of Christ." Gerow retired as bishop of Natchez-Jackson in 1967.

The next bishop of Natchez-Jackson was Auxiliary Bishop Joseph Brunini, appointed by Pope Paul VI in 1967. He was the first native Mississippian to serve in that post. During his tenure, Brunini was an outspoken advocate of the American Civil Rights Movement; he once declared, "We as religious leaders can't blame the politicians if we don't do our job first." He co-founded and served as the first president of the Mississippi Religious Leadership Conference. In 1977, Paul VI erected the Diocese of Biloxi, removing the southern counties of Mississippi from what was now called the Diocese of Jackson.

Coat of arms of the former Diocese of Natchez-Jackson (1956–1977).

=== 1980 to present ===
When Brunini retired in 1984, Pope John Paul II named William Houck from the Archdiocese of Mobile to serve as bishop of Jackson. Houck retired in 2003 and John Paul II appointed Joseph Latino of the Diocese of Houma-Thibodoux that same year. He instituted the Office for Protection of Children. Latino retired as bishop of Jackson in 2013.

Pope Francis in 2013 appointed Joseph Kopacz from the Diocese of Scranton as the next bishop of Jackson.The diocese in 2018 opened a cause for canonization of Sister Mary Thea Bowman, who worked to evangelize African-Americans to Catholicism. Federal prosecutors in July 2019 indicted Lenin Vargas, the former pastor of St. Joseph parish in Starkville, on charges of defrauding his parishioners of tens of thousands of dollars. He fled to Mexico in 2018. To avoid its own criminal liability, the diocese signed an agreement with prosecutors to tighten its financial controls over priests.

Arie Mattheus de Lange, a former finance director for the diocese, sued Kopacz and the diocese in October 2019. De Lange claimed that his firing in 2018 was unjust and in retaliation for his opposition to the diocesan budget.

=== Sexual abuse ===
In 2006, the diocese settled lawsuits with 19 sexual abuse victims for $5 million, with an average payout of over $250,000 per victim.

In 2020, the media reported that La Jarvis D. Love claimed that he was sexually abused by Paul West, a religious brother at a Franciscan primary school in Greenwood. Love in early 2019 accepted a $15,000 financial settlement from the Franciscan Order. In August 2019, three of Love's cousins also accused West of sexually abusing them in the mid-1990s. In August 2020, West was extradited from Wisconsin to Mississippi to face trial. West was convicted in April 2022 of sexual battery and gratification of lust and sentenced to 45 years in prison.

== Demographics ==
The first cathedral of the Diocese of Natchez was St. Mary's in Natchez, whose cornerstone was laid by Bishop Chanche in 1842. The current seat of the Diocese of Jackson is the Cathedral of St. Peter the Apostle in Jackson. In 1998, St. Mary's was designated as Saint Mary Basilica.

The diocese encompasses an area that is overwhelmingly Protestant. Only about 2.6% of the residents in the diocese are considered Catholic (about 52,000 Catholics out of a total population of nearly 2 million).

== Bishops ==
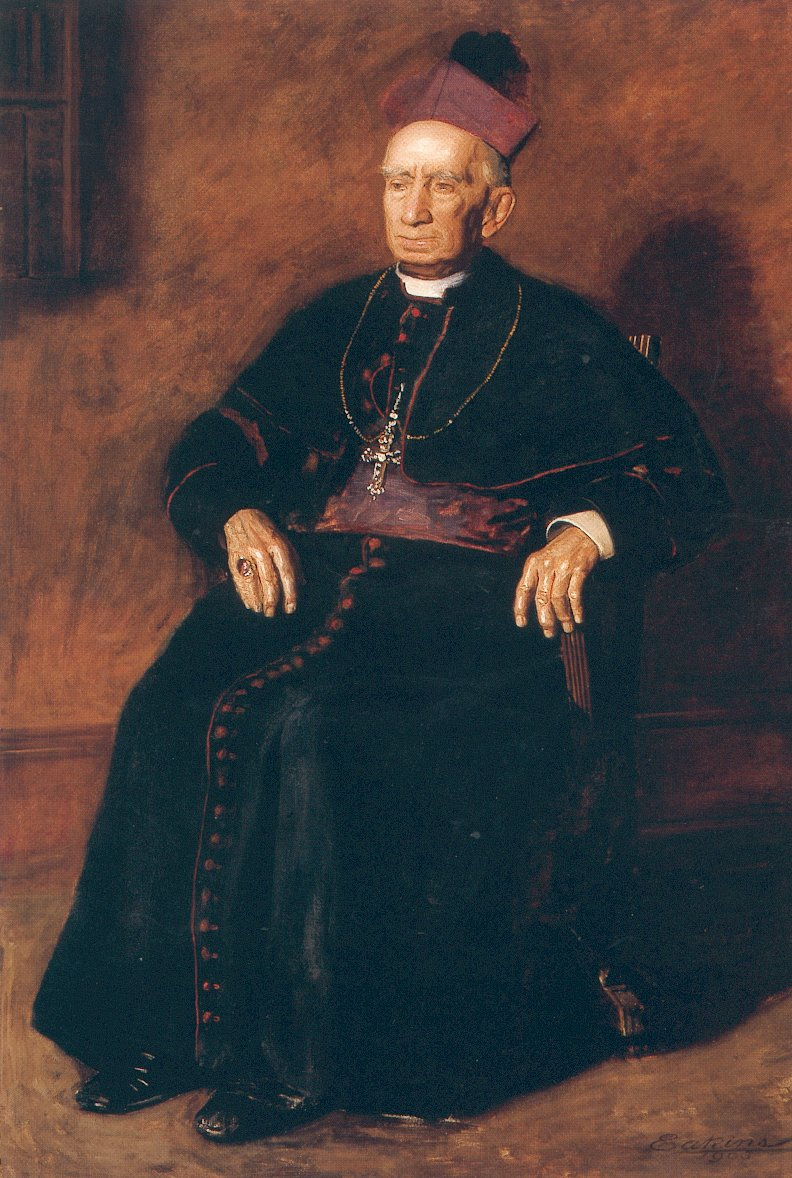
Archbishop Elder (1903)

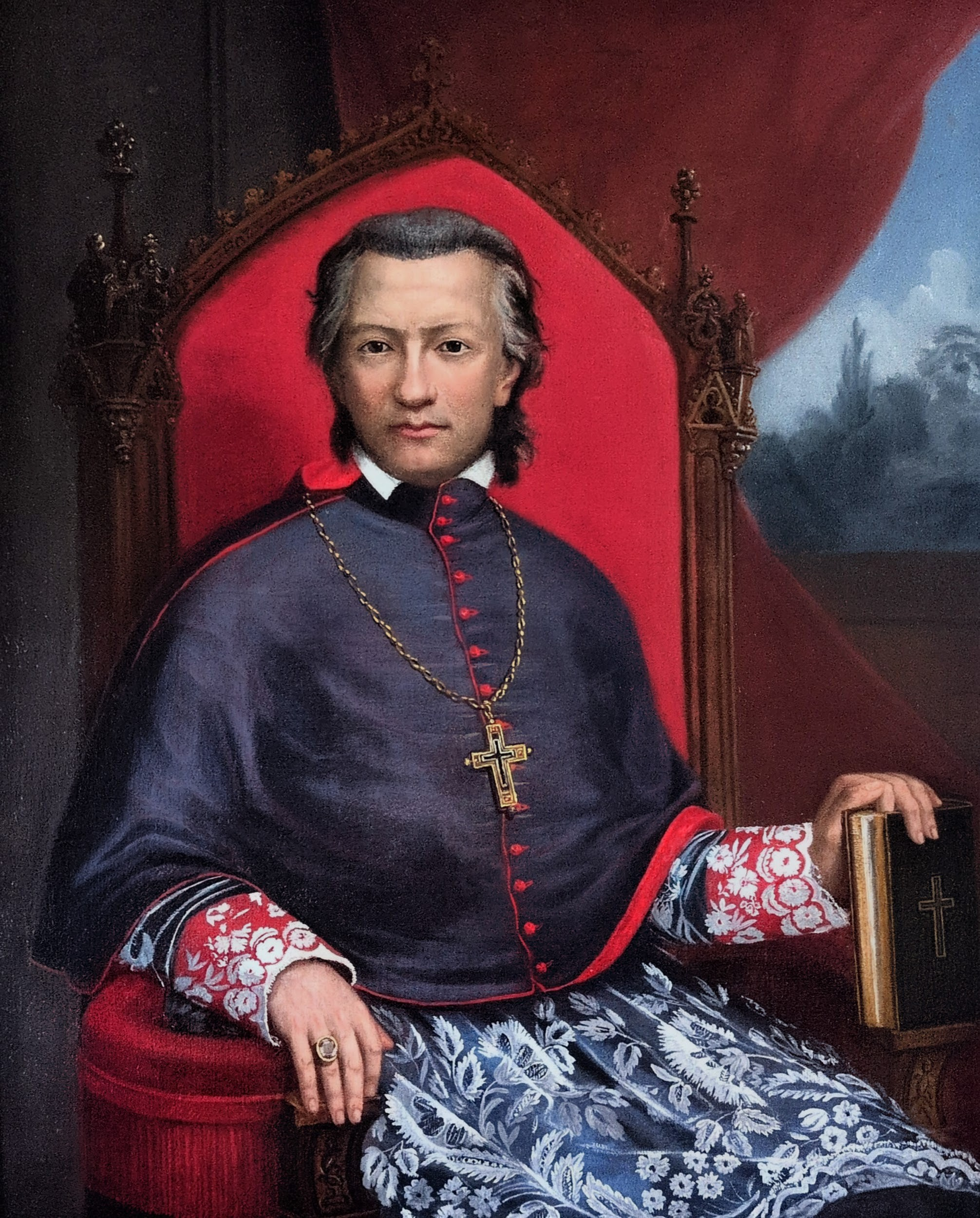
Bishop John Chance

=== Vicars Apostolic of Mississippi ===
Louis William Valentine DuBourg (1825–1826)

=== Bishops of Natchez ===
1. John J. Chanche, P.S.S. (1840–1852)
2. James Oliver Van de Velde, S.J. (1853–1855)
3. William Henry Elder (1857–1880), appointed Archbishop of Cincinnati
4. Francis Janssens (1881–1888), appointed Archbishop of New Orleans
5. Thomas Heslin (1889–1911)
6. John Edward Gunn, S.M. (1911–1924)
7. Richard Oliver Gerow (1924–1956), title changed with title of diocese

=== Bishops of Natchez-Jackson ===
1. Richard Oliver Gerow (1956–1967)
2. Joseph Bernard Brunini (1967–1977), title changed with title of diocese

=== Bishops of Jackson ===
1. Joseph Bernard Brunini (1977–1984)
2. William Russell Houck (1984–2003)
3. Joseph Nunzio Latino (2003–2013)
4. Joseph R. Kopacz (2014–present)

=== Former auxiliary bishops ===
- Joseph Bernard Brunini (1957–1967), appointed Bishop of Jackson
- Joseph Lawson Howze (1973–1977), appointed Bishop of Biloxi
- William Russell Houck (1979–1984), appointed Bishop of Jackson

=== Other diocesan priests who became bishops ===
- Bernard Francis Law, appointed Bishop of Springfield-Cape Girardeau in 1973; later made cardinal
- Ronald Paul Herzog, appointed Bishop of Alexandria in 2004

== Schools ==
=== Elementary and high schools ===
- Cathedral High School – Natchez
- St. Joseph Catholic School – Greenville
- Vicksburg Catholic - St. Aloysius High School – Vicksburg

=== Middle and high schools ===
- St. Joseph Catholic – Madison
