= Dillon Johnson =

American football player (born 2001)

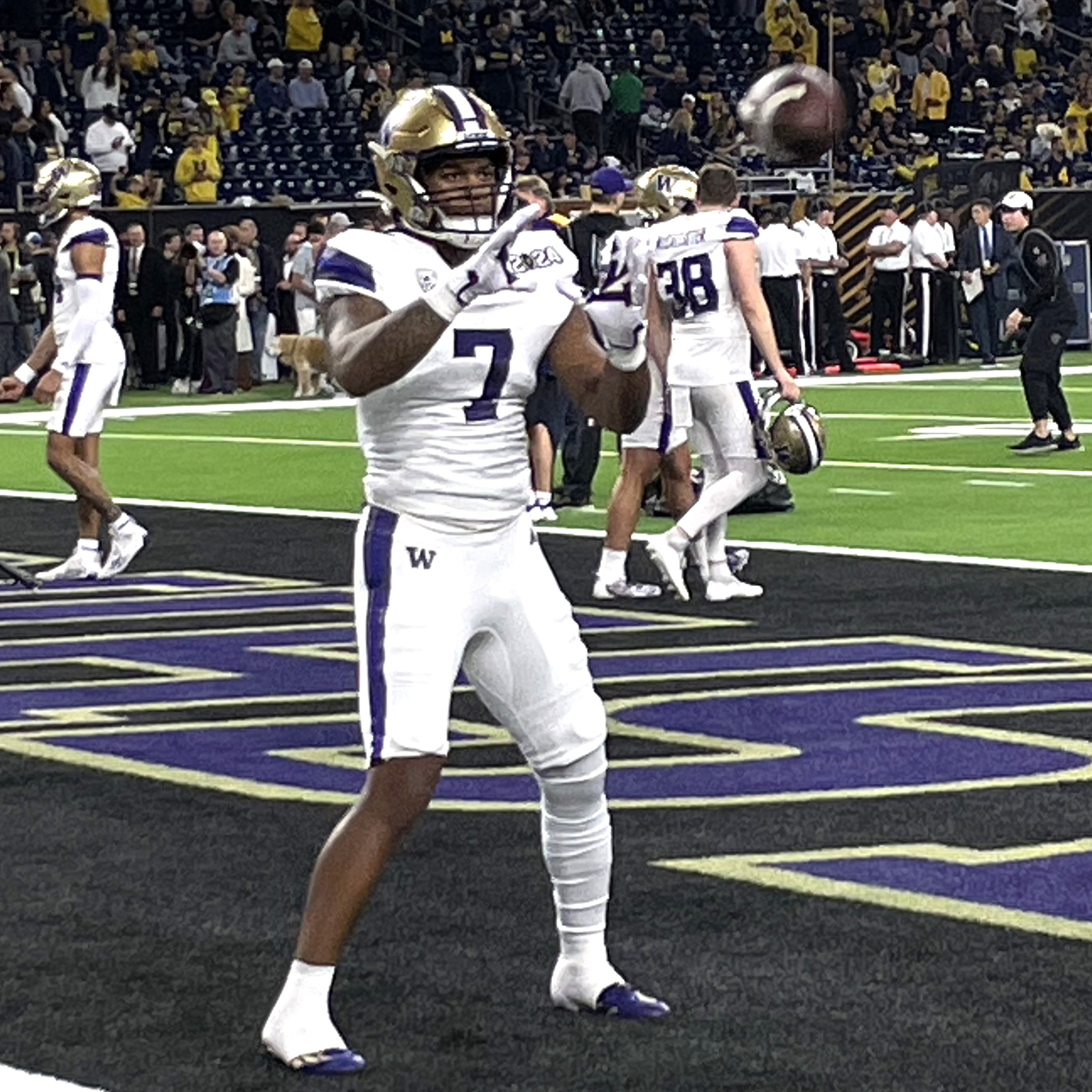
- Johnson with Washington in January 2024

Profile
- Position: Running back

Personal information
- Born: June 15, 2001 (age 25)
- Listed height: 6 ft 0 in (1.83 m)
- Listed weight: 217 lb (98 kg)

Career information
- High school: St. Joseph (Greenville)
- College: Mississippi State (2020–2022); Washington (2023)
- NFL draft: 2024: undrafted

Career history
- Tennessee Titans (2024)*; Carolina Panthers (2024)*
- * Offseason or practice squad member only

Awards and highlights
- Second-team All-Pac-12 (2023)
- Stats at Pro Football Reference

Dillon Alexander Johnson-Norris (born June 15, 2001) is an American professional football running back. He played college football for the Mississippi State Bulldogs and Washington Huskies.

== Early life ==
Johnson attended St. Joseph High School in Greenville, Mississippi, where he threw for 957 yards and 12 touchdowns and rushed for 4,287 yards and 54 touchdowns. He recorded 389 tackles, ten forced fumbles, and nine interceptions on defense and had a career average of 48.5 yards per punt as a punter. Coming out of high school, Johnson was rated as a four-star recruit and committed to play college football at Mississippi State University.

== College career ==
=== Mississippi State ===
During Johnson's first season in 2020 (which was shortened due to COVID-19), he rushed 51 times for 225 yards and four touchdowns, while also making 36 receptions for 157 yards. In 2021, he rushed for 485 yards and four touchdowns on 89 carries, while also notching 65 receptions for 422 yards and a touchdown. In 2022, Johnson rushed for 488 yards and three touchdowns on 89 carries and hauled in 48 receptions for 285 yards. After the season, he entered his name into the NCAA transfer portal.

Johnson finished his career at Mississippi State with 1,198 yards and 11 touchdowns on 229 carries, while also bringing in 149 receptions for 864 yards and one touchdown.

=== Washington ===
Johnson transferred to the University of Washington. In week 5 of the 2023 season, he rushed for a career-high 91 yards and two touchdowns, while also making five catches for 48 yards, in a 31-24 win over Arizona. In week 7, Johnson rushed 20 times for 100 yards and a touchdown in a win over Oregon. He ran for 152 yards and two touchdowns in the final Pac-12 Championship game as Washington defeated Oregon. Johnson had two rushing touchdowns and 49 yards against Texas in the Sugar Bowl before leaving the game with an ankle injury. In the National Championship against Michigan, he led the Huskies with 33 rushing yards on 11 carries.

=== Statistics ===
Year	Team	Games		Rushing				Receiving			
Year	Team	GP	GS	Att	Yards	Avg	TD	Rec	Yards	Avg	TD
2020	Mississippi State	11	1	51	225	4.4	4	36	157	4.4	0
2021	Mississippi State	13	7	89	485	5.4	4	65	422	6.5	1
2022	Mississippi State	11	6	89	488	5.5	3	48	285	5.9	0
2023	Washington	14	14	233	1,195	5.1	16	24	190	7.9	0
Career		49	28	462	2,393	5.2	27	173	1,054	6.1	1

== Professional career ==
Pre-draft measurables
Height	Weight	Arm length	Hand span	Wingspan	40-yard dash	10-yard split	20-yard split	Vertical jump	Broad jump	Bench press
5 ft 11 5/8 in (1.82 m)	217 lb (98 kg)	30 in (0.76 m)	9 3/8 in (0.24 m)	6 ft 0 5/8 in (1.84 m)	4.68 s	1.62 s	2.68 s	31.5 in (0.80 m)	9 ft 9 in (2.97 m)	24 reps
All values from NFL Combine/Pro Day

=== Tennessee Titans ===
On April 27, 2024, Johnson signed with the Tennessee Titans as an undrafted free agent after he was not selected in the 2024 NFL draft. He was waived on July 25.

=== Carolina Panthers ===
On July 31, 2024, Johnson was signed by the Carolina Panthers. He was waived on August 19, and re-signed to the practice squad on September 5. Johnson was released by the Panthers on December 19.

== Personal life ==
Johnson has one son, Dillon Johnson Jr., who was born on August 2, 2022.
