= DeMichael Harris =

American football player (born 1998)

No. 12
- Position: Wide receiver

Personal information
- Born: July 12, 1998 (age 28); Vicksburg, Mississippi, U.S.
- Listed height: 5 ft 8 in (1.73 m)
- Listed weight: 178 lb (81 kg)

Career information
- High school: St. Aloysius (Vicksburg, Mississippi)
- College: Hinds (2016–2017); Southern Miss (2018–2019)
- NFL draft: 2020: undrafted

Career history
- Indianapolis Colts (2020–2022); Ottawa Redblacks (2023)*
- * Offseason or practice squad member only

Career NFL statistics
- Receptions: 10
- Receiving yards: 79
- Rushing yards: 46
- Stats at Pro Football Reference

DeMichael Harris (born July 12, 1998) is an American former football wide receiver and return specialist. He played college football at Southern Miss. Harris has been a member of the Indianapolis Colts and Ottawa Redblacks.

== Early life ==
Harris grew up in Vicksburg, Mississippi and attended St. Aloysius High School, where he played football and ran track. In two seasons as the Flashes' starting running back he rushed 362 times for 3,649 yards and 47 touchdowns and was named the Warren County Offensive Player of the Year by The Vicksburg Post both years. He also won the MAIS state title in the 100, 200 and 400-meters as a senior.

== College career ==
Harris began his collegiate career at Hinds Community College. He caught 29 passes for 259 yards and returned 20 kickoffs for 612 yards as a sophomore. Harris transferred Southern Mississippi for his final two seasons of eligibility.

In his first season with the Golden Eagles, Harris had 27 receptions for 241 yards and two touchdowns and returned 13 kickoffs for 312 yards. He switched positions to running back during his senior season due to injuries at the position. Harris named honorable mention All-Conference USA after finishing the season with 113 carries for 541 yards and five touchdowns, catching 34 passes for 346 yards and three touchdowns, while also returning 10 kickoffs for 282 yards and one touchdown.

== Professional career ==
Pre-draft measurables
Height	Weight
5 ft 8 5/8 in (1.74 m)	175 lb (79 kg)
Values from Pro Day

=== Indianapolis Colts ===
Harris was signed as an undrafted free agent by the Indianapolis Colts on April 25, 2020. He was waived during final roster cuts on September 5, but was signed to the team's practice squad the next day. Harris was elevated to the active roster on October 17 and made his debut the next day against the Cincinnati Bengals, catching three passes for 29 yards in a 31–27 victory. He reverted to the practice squad after the game on October 19. He was elevated to the active roster again on November 7 for the team's week 9 game against the Baltimore Ravens, and reverted to the practice squad after the game. On November 10, he was signed to the 53-man roster.

On August 31, 2021, Harris was waived by the Colts and re-signed to the practice squad the next day. He signed a reserve/future contract on January 10, 2022. On August 30, 2022, Harris was waived by the Colts. He was re-signed to the practice squad on October 18. He was released on October 25.

=== Ottawa Redblacks ===
On March 20, 2023, Harris signed with the Ottawa Redblacks of the Canadian Football League (CFL). On June 3, 2023, Harris was released by the Redblacks.
