= St. Joseph Catholic School (Greenville, Mississippi) =

Location
- 1501 V.F.W. Road; Greenville, Mississippi 38701; United States; 33°21′19″N 91°1′42″W

Information
- Type: Private, coeducational
- Motto: Animus, Mentis, Corpus (Soul, Mind, Body)
- Religious affiliation: Roman Catholic
- Denomination: Catholic
- Established: 1888
- Founder: P.J. Korstenbroek
- Local authority: Western Line Schools
- Oversight: Roman Catholic Diocese of Jackson
- Superintendent: Catherine Cook
- Principal: Craig Mandolini
- Chaplain: Bill Henry
- Grades: Pre-Kindergarten–12
- Gender: Co-educational
- Student to teacher ratio: 9:1
- Classrooms: 20
- Campus size: 61,000 sq ft (5,700 m^{2})
- Colors: Green and white
- Athletics conference: MAIS AAA
- Mascot: Leprechaun
- Nickname: Irish
- Team name: Fighting Irish
- Rival: Washington School (Greenville, MS)
- Accreditation: Mississippi Department of Education; Southern Association of Colleges and Schools
- National ranking: 709th of Catholic Schools in America
- Affiliation: National Catholic Educational Association
- Website: www.stjoeirish.org

St. Joseph Catholic School is a private Roman Catholic K-12 school in Greenville, Mississippi, under the auspices of the Roman Catholic Diocese of Jackson. St. Joseph is accredited by CASI/Southern Association of Colleges and Schools, and by the Mississippi Department of Education. All professional instructional and administrative staff are fully licensed. Co-curricular and sports activities are governed by the Mississippi Association of Independent Schools (MAIS). St. Joseph is accredited by the Southern Association of Colleges and Schools (SACS) and by the Mississippi Department of Education.

== History ==
The history of St. Joseph Catholic School began with St. Rose of Lima Academy, founded by Father P.J. Korstenbroek and staffed by the Sisters of Mercy. Located next to the St. Joseph Parish Church, St. Rose was the standard for Catholic education in the Delta for sixty-two years. By 1949 the enrollment had exceeded the space of the building, and St. Joseph Elementary and High School were opened in 1950. In 1964, once again the enrollment and needs of the school family called for another facility. A new elementary school, Our Lady of Lourdes, was constructed on Reed Road. St. Joseph became the combined middle school and high school. St. Joseph High School continued to meet the needs of the students by adding six classrooms for the Middle School in 1965 and an additional four classrooms in 1994.

St. Joseph Catholic High School embarked on an ambitious building project with the construction of a new 61,000-square-foot (5,700 m^{2}) St. Joseph Middle/Senior High School located on VFW Road. Where the school is still located to this day.

In early 2015 plans were announced to move the elementary school "Our Lady of Lourdes" to the VFW Road Campus to bring the schools back together as one. Principal Paul Artman Jr. was the principal of St.Joe during the switch and Michelle Gardener was the principal of Lourdes. In 2016 construction was started on two new editions on each wing with four new classrooms in both of the new buildings. The construction on both buildings was continued throughout the summer until the beginning of the next school year forcing the high school to have classes in the gym. The elementary building was the first to open and the Our Lady of Lourdes Building on Reed Road was sold. The school administratively became PK-12 in August of that year. Finally in October 2016 the new addition on the High School and Middle School was finished, and the two schools were back on the same campus together as one.

== Notable alumni ==
- Trey Benson, college football running back for the Florida State Seminoles
- Dillon Johnson, college football running back for the Washington Huskies
