= William Russell Houck =

American prelate

His Excellency, The Most Reverend William Russell Houck
- Bishop of Jackson; Titular Bishop of Alexanum
- Church: Roman Catholic Church
- Diocese: Jackson
- In office: 1984 to 2003
- Predecessor: Joseph Bernard Brunini
- Successor: Joseph Nunzio Latino
- Previous post: Auxiliary Bishop of Jackson (1979 to 1984)

Orders
- Ordination: May 19, 1951 by Thomas Joseph Toolen
- Consecration: May 27, 1979. by Pope John Paul II

Personal details
- Born: July 26, 1926 Mobile, Alabama, US
- Died: March 9, 2016 (aged 89) Jackson, Mississippi, US
- Motto: Proclaim Jesus is Lord

Styles of William Russell Houck
- Reference style: His Excellency; The Most Reverend
- Spoken style: Your Excellency
- Religious style: Bishop

William Russell Houck (July 26, 1926 – March 9, 2016) was an American Catholic prelate who served as Bishop of Jackson from 1984 to 2003 in the U.S. in Jackson, Mississippi. He was previously an auxiliary bishop there from 1979 to 1984.

== Biography ==
=== Early life ===
William Houck was born in Mobile, Alabama, on July 26, 1926. He was ordained a priest by Archbishop Thomas Toolen in Mobile on May 19, 1951, at the Cathedral of the Immaculate Conception for the Archdiocese of Mobile.

=== Auxiliary Bishop and Bishop of Jackson ===
On March 28, 1979, Houck was named auxiliary bishop of Jackson and titular bishop of Alexanum by Pope John Paul II Houck was consecrated by the pope in St. Peter's Basilica in Rome on May 27, 1979. Houck was appointed bishop of Jackson on April 11, 1984, by John Paul II and installed on June 5, 1984.

=== Retirement and death ===
On January 3, 2003, John Paul II accepted Houck's resignation as bishop of Jackson. William Houck died on March 9, 2016, at St. Dominic's Hospital in Jackson of complications following cardiac surgery.

== Episcopal succession ==
Catholic Church titles
Preceded by Joseph Bernard Brunini	Bishop of Jackson; 1984–2003	Succeeded by Joseph Nunzio Latino
Preceded by –	Auxiliary Bishop of Jackson; 1979–1984	Succeeded by –
