= Joseph Kopacz =

American prelate

His Excellency, The Most Reverend Joseph R. Kopacz
- Bishop of Jackson
- Church: Catholic Church
- Diocese: Jackson
- Appointed: December 12, 2013
- Installed: February 6, 2014
- Predecessor: Joseph Nunzio Latino

Orders
- Ordination: May 7, 1977 by Joseph Carroll McCormick
- Consecration: February 6, 2014 by Thomas John Rodi, Joseph Nunzio Latino, and Joseph Bambera

Personal details
- Born: September 16, 1950 (age 76) Dunmore, Pennsylvania
- Education: University of Scranton; Christ the King Seminary; Fordham University; Marywood University
- Motto: Fiat lux (Let there be light)

Styles of Joseph Richard Kopacz
- Reference style: His Excellency; The Most Reverend
- Spoken style: Your Excellency
- Religious style: Bishop

Joseph Richard Kopacz (born September 16, 1950) is an American Catholic prelate who has served as Bishop of Jackson since 2014.

== Biography ==
=== Early life and education ===
Joseph Kopacz was born in Dunmore, Pennsylvania. He is the son of Stanley and Carmella Calomino Kopacz. He is the second of three children with a brother, Robert, and a sister, Mary Ellen Negri. Joseph Kopacz is a graduate of Dunmore Central Catholic High School. He obtained a Bachelor of Arts in history from the University of Scranton in Scranton, Pennsylvania.

Kopacz then entered the Seminary of Christ the King in Buffalo, New York, where he obtained a Master of Theology degree. He then went to New York City to attend Fordham University a Master of Arts degree in Latin. He obtained a master's degree in counseling and psychology and a doctorate in human development from Marywood University in Scranton.

=== Priesthood ===
Kopacz was ordained a priest for the Diocese of Scranton on May 7, 1977, at St. Peter's Cathedral in Scranton by Bishop Joseph McCormick.

After his ordination, the diocese assigned Kopacz as parochial vicar of Our Lady Queen of Peace Parish in Brodheadsville, Pennsylvania, and Epiphany Parish in Sayre, Pennsylvania. He also served as administrator of St. Patrick's Parish in Nicholson, Pennsylvania. He was moved from these three parishes in 1980 to Saint Pius X Seminary in Dalton, Pennsylvania, to be a faculty member. Kopacz spent the next ten years at Saint Pius.

In 1989, the diocese appointed Kopacz as pastor of three parishes in Jessup, Pennsylvania: Saint Michael, Saint James and Saint Stanislaus. He was moved again in 1995 to the post of pastor at Nativity of Our Lord Parish in Scranton. In 1998, Bishop James Timlin named Kopacz as director of education at Saint Pius X. He left the seminary in 2002 to be pastor of the Sacred Hearts of Jesus and Mary Parish in Scranton.

Bishop Joseph Martino selected Kopacz in 2005 to serve as vicar general and vicar for clergy (February 2005 – August 2009). In 2006, he also became pastor of Most Holy Trinity Parish in Mount Pocono, Pennsylvania. Kopacz was a member of the council for finance and the coordinator of the Hispanic apostolate for Monroe County, Pennsylvania.

=== Bishop of Jackson ===
On December 12, 2013 Pope Francis appointed Kopacz as the eleventh bishop of Jackson. He was consecrated at the Cathedral of St. Peter the Apostle in Jackson by Archbishop Thomas Rodi on February 6, 2014. Emeritus Bishop Joseph Latino and Bishop Joseph Bambera were the principal co-consecrators.

In March 2018, the diocese removed Reverend Lenin Vargas, the pastor at St. Joseph's Parish in Starkville, Mississippi, and Corpus Christi Parish in Macon, Mississippi. In February, the diocese had discovered that Vargas had been defrauding his parishioners for several years, fundraising for nonexistent cancer treatments. During a visit to Corpus Christi in March, Kopacz told parishioners that Vargas had been sent away for counseling, When asked about the fundraising, Kopacz did not inform them about Vargas' criminal activities. Kopacz only revealed the fraud when local authorities started a criminal investigation in 2018. Vargas, who had previously fled to Mexico, was indicted in July 2020 on 10 counts of wire fraud.

== See also ==
- Catholic Church hierarchy
- Catholic Church in the United States
- Historical list of the Catholic bishops of the United States
- List of Catholic bishops of the United States
- Lists of patriarchs, archbishops, and bishops

== Episcopal succession ==
Catholic Church titles
Preceded by Joseph Nunzio Latino	Bishop of Jackson; 2014–Present	Succeeded by Incumbent
