= William Henry Elder =

American Roman Catholic bishop

His Excellency, the Most Reverend William Henry Elder
- Archbishop of Cincinnati
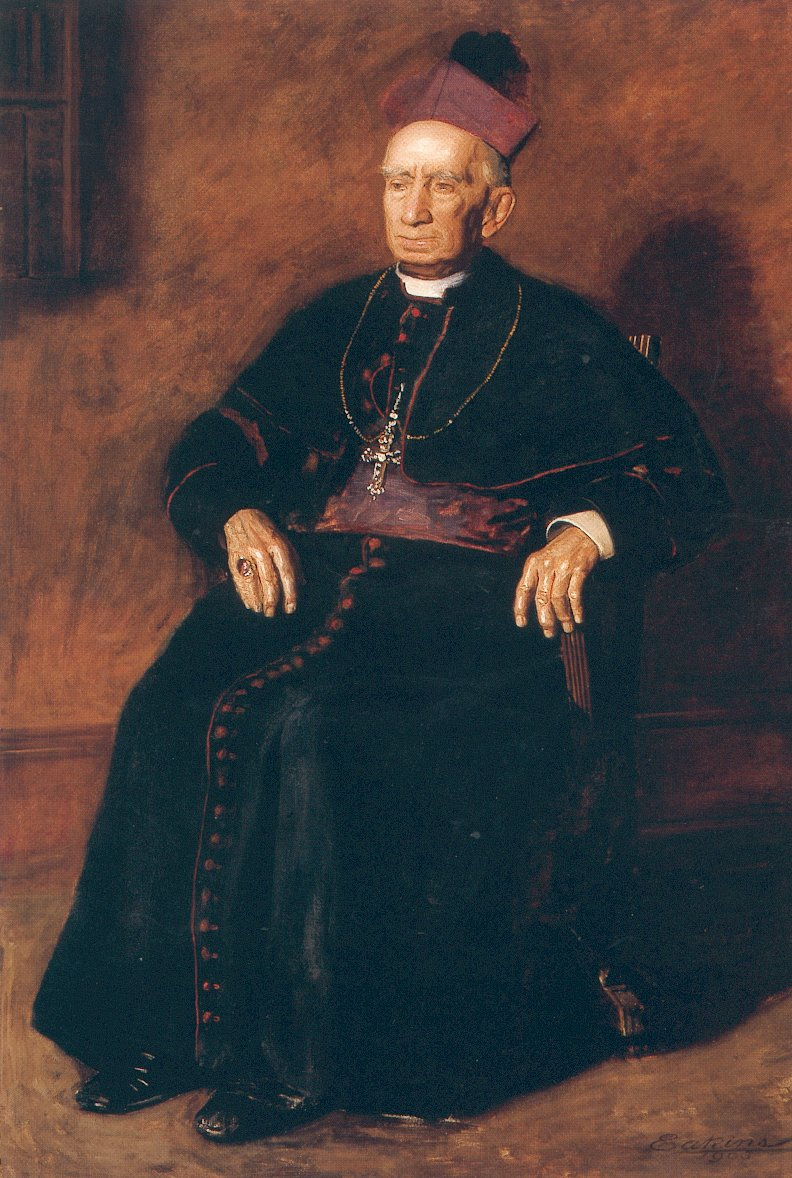
- Archbishop Elder (1903)
- Archdiocese: Cincinnati
- In office: 1883–1904
- Predecessor: John Baptist Purcell
- Successor: Henry K. Moeller
- Previous post: Bishop of Natchez (1857–1878) Coadjutor Archbishop of Cincinnati (1880–1883)

Orders
- Ordination: March 29, 1846 by Giovanni Brunelli
- Consecration: May 3, 1857 by Francis Kenrick

Personal details
- Born: March 22, 1819 Baltimore, Maryland, US
- Died: October 31, 1904 (aged 85) Cincinnati, Ohio, US
- Buried: St. Joseph New Cemetery, Cincinnati
- Denomination: Roman Catholic
- Education: Mount St. Mary's University; Pontifical Urban College
- Motto: Vincit mundum fides (Faith conquers the world)
- Signature: William Henry Elder's signature

- Coat of arms

Ordination history of William Henry Elder
History
Priestly ordination
- Ordained by: Giovanni Brunelli
- Date: 29 March 1846
- Place: Rome, Italy
Episcopal consecration
- Principal consecrator: Francis Patrick Kenrick
- Co-consecrators: John McGill James Frederick Bryan Wood
- Date: 3 May 1857
- Place: Cathedral of the Assumption of Blessed Virgin Mary, Baltimore, Maryland, United States
Episcopal succession
Bishops consecrated by William Henry Elder as principal consecrator
- John Ambrose Wtterson: 8 August 1880
- Henry Joseph Richter: 22 April 1883
- Camillus Paul Maes: 25 January 1885
- John Frederick Ignatius Horstmann: 25 February 1892
- Thomas Sebastian Byrne: 25 July 1894
- Denis O'Donaghue: 25 April 1900
- Henry Moeller: 25 August 1900
- Herman Joseph Alerding: 30 November 1900

William Henry Elder (March 22, 1819 – October 31, 1904) was an American Catholic prelate who served as bishop of Natchez in Mississippi from 1857 to 1880 and as archbishop of Cincinnati in Ohio from 1883 until he died in 1904.

== Biography ==
=== Early life and education ===
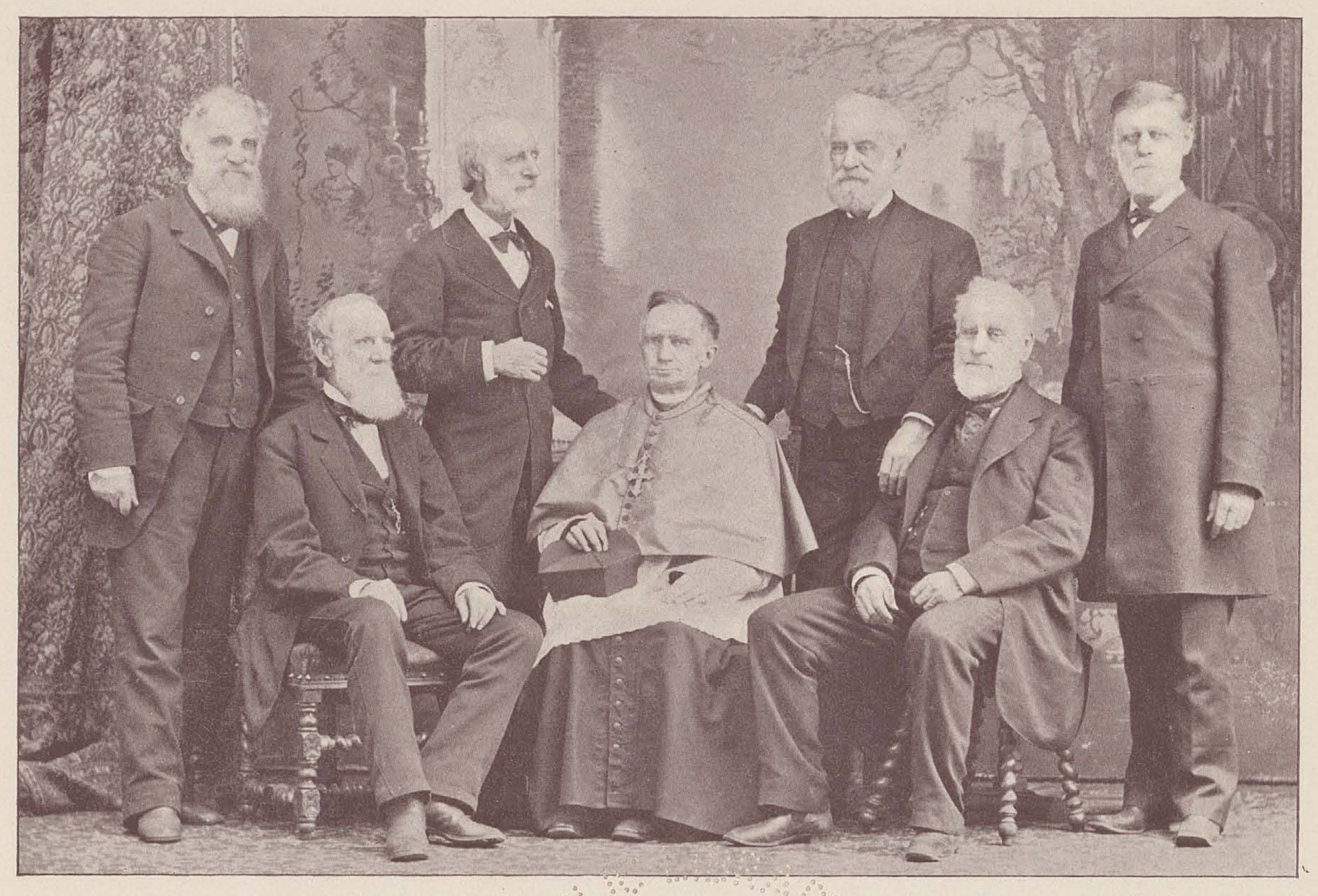
Archbishop Elder and his six brothers (1883)

William Elder was born in Baltimore, Maryland, on March 22, 1819. His father, Basil Elder, was a descendant of William Elder, a Catholic immigrant from England to the Province of Maryland in colonial times. His grandfather was Thomas Elder, the husband of Elizabeth Spalding, making William a first-cousin-removed of Catherine Spalding, co-founder of the Sisters of Charity of Nazareth. His mother was Elisabeth Miles (née Snowden) Elder.

In 1831, Elder entered Mount St. Mary's College in Emmitsburg, Maryland. He graduated in 1837 and entered the seminary. In 1842, he was sent to the Pontifical Urban College in Rome, where he received the degree of Doctor of Divinity.

=== Priesthood ===
Elder was ordained a priest for the Archdiocese of Baltimore in Rome on March 29, 1846, by Cardinal Giovanni Brunelli. After his ordination, the archdiocese assigned Elder to teach at Mount St. Mary's.

=== Bishop of Natchez ===
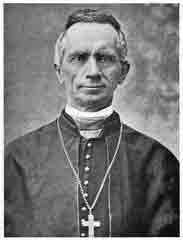
Bishop Elder (pre-1904)

Elder was appointed bishop of Natchez on January 9, 1857, by Pope Pius IX. Elder was consecrated in the Cathedral of the Immaculate Conception of the Blessed Mary in Baltimore by Archbishop Francis Kenrick on May 3, 1857. At that time, the diocese comprised the entire state of Mississippi.

In 1861, Mississippi declared secession from the United States, joining the Confederate States of America. On the eve of the American Civil War, Elder wrote to his father:

It is hard to tell what is to be the fate of the country. I have not enough of political sagacity to see what will be the course of events, nor what would be the fruit of the remedies proposed. . . . We can all unite in praying to God to guide and protect us.

During the war, Elder celebrated mass for wounded soldiers and displaced civilians, including both Confederate troops and formerly enslaved people in Natchez. He also assigned priests as chaplains in the Confederate States Army and Sisters of Mercy to care for the wounded. He blessed a group of Confederate volunteers from Natchez.

In July 1863, the Union Army reestablished control of Natchez. On June 18, 1864, Colonel B.G. Farrar, the Union Army commander at Natchez and a former schoolmate of Elder's at Mount St. Mary's, ordered the clergy in Natchez to include prayers for US President Abraham Lincoln in their services. Farrar characterized the order as a "public recognition of allegiance under which they live, and to which they are indebted for protection..."

Elder refused, arguing that the directive infringed upon the "Liberty of the Church to discharge her divine functions, without interference from other persons". Brigadier General James Tuttle initially issued an enforcement order, which he then stayed at Elder's request, pending review by the U.S. War Department. Elder wrote to Lincoln, explaining that his refusal was based on the church's authority to regulate church services. Senator Francis Kernan wrote back to Elder, saying he had met with Secretary of War Edwin M. Stanton and Stanton would ask Tuttle not to interfere with Elder. Elder subsequently wrote, thanking Stanton for protecting religious freedom, and requesting that the decision be communicated to other military commanders.

General Mason Brayman adopted a stricter enforcement posture, saying "military orders are to be followed, not discussed..." and ordered Elder detained in Vidalia, Louisiana. Elder was held in custody in Vidalia for several weeks. After intervention from federal authorities in Washington, Brayman ordered Elder's release on August 12, 1864.

In 1878, a yellow fever epidemic broke out in Natchez. Elder contracted the disease while ministering to the sick. He survived the illness but lost six diocesan priests to the epidemic. When he arrived in Natchez, the diocese included eleven missions (churches), nine priests, and 10,000 Catholics. When he left, there were 41 churches, 25 priests, 6 religious houses for men, 5 convents, 13 parish schools, and 12,500 Catholics.

=== Coadjutor Archbishop and Archbishop of Cincinnati ===
On January 30, 1880, Pope Leo XIII appointed Elder as coadjutor archbishop of Cincinnati with the right of succession, to assist Archbishop John Purcell.

After Purcell died on July 4, 1883, Elder automatically succeeded him as archbishop. He became archbishop at a time of great financial difficulty in the archdiocese. Elder systematically organized the administration of the diocese. He reopened Mount Saint Mary Seminary in Cincinnati in 1887, which had been closed since 1879. He instituted the office of chancellor and insisted on annual financial reports from clergy and parishes to reduce the archdiocesan debt.

=== Death and legacy ===
Elder died in Cincinnati on October 31, 1904, from influenza. Elder High School, a Cincinnati parochial school, was named for Elder.

== See also ==
- Archdiocese of Cincinnati

Catholic Church titles
Preceded by James Oliver Van de Velde	Bishop of Natchez; 1857–1880	Succeeded by Francis Janssens
Preceded by John Baptist Purcell	Archbishop of Cincinnati; 1883–1903	Succeeded by Henry K. Moeller
