= John J. Chanche =

American prelate (1795-1852)

His Excellency. The Right Reverend John Joseph Chanche S.S.
- Bishop of Natchez
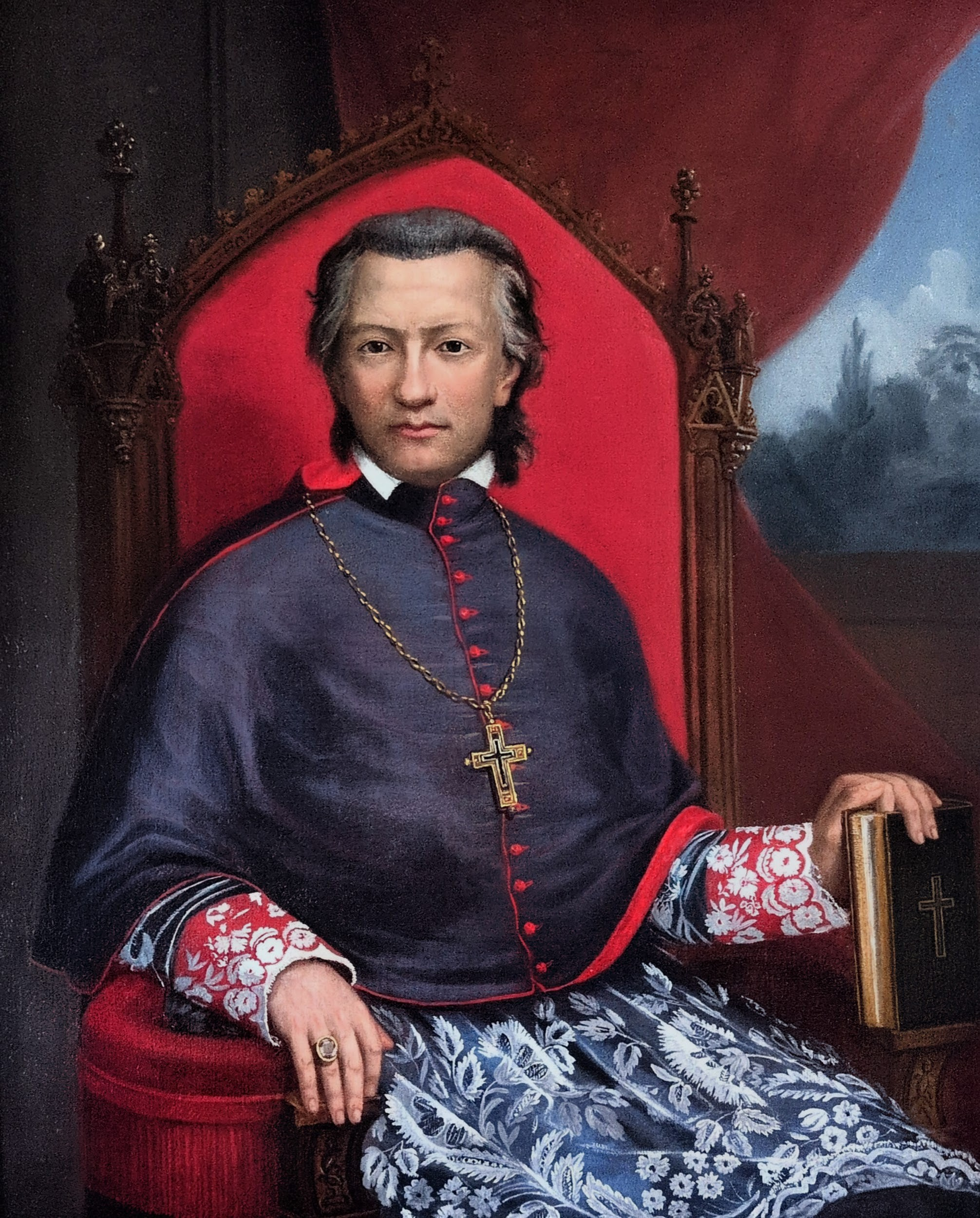
- See: Diocese of Natchez
- In office: March 14, 1841 – July 22, 1852
- Predecessor: None
- Successor: James Oliver Van de Velde
- Previous post: President of St. Mary's Seminary (1834 to 1841)

Orders
- Ordination: June 5, 1819 by Ambrose Maréchal
- Consecration: March 14, 1841 by Samuel Eccleston

Personal details
- Born: October 4, 1795 Baltimore, Maryland, US
- Died: July 22, 1852 (aged 56) Frederick, Maryland, US
- Education: St. Mary's Seminary

Styles of John Mary Joseph Benedict Chanche
- Reference style: His Excellency; The Right Reverend
- Spoken style: Your Excellency
- Religious style: Bishop

John Mary Joseph Benedict Chanche, S.S., (October 4, 1795 – July 22, 1852) was an American prelate of the Roman Catholic Church. He served as the first bishop of the Diocese of Natchez in Mississippi from 1841 to 1852. Chanche was a member of the Society of the Priests of Saint Sulpice (Sulpicians).

== Biography ==
=== Early life ===
John Chanche was born on October 4, 1795, in Baltimore, Maryland to John and Catherine Provost Chanche. His father had been a merchant in French colony of Saint-Domingue, present-day Haiti. After the outbreak of the Haitian Revolution in 1791, the Chanche family fled to Baltimore.

John Chanche was baptized on August 13, 1796, by Reverend Francis Beeston, rector of St. Peter's Pro-Cathedral in Baltimore. Deciding to become a priest, Chanche in 1806 entered St. Mary's Seminary in Baltimore, operated by the Sulpicians. He received "first tonsure" from Archbishop John Carroll. Chanche began his theological studies in 1814, and received his minor orders from Archbishop Leonard Neale.

=== Priesthood ===
Chanche was ordained a priest in Baltimore for the Sulpicians on June 5, 1819, by Archbishop Ambrose Maréchal. The Supicians then assigned Chanche to teach at St. Mary's Seminary. In 1833, he was chosen as master of ceremonies for the Second Provincial Council of Baltimore, a major step by the bishops of the nation in organizing the church structure. The Sulpicians named Chanche as vice resident of St. Mary's; he became its president in 1834.

During his time as a priest, the Vatican offered Chanche an appointment as coadjutor archbishop of the Archdiocese of Baltimore, then later as coadjutor bishop of the Diocese of Boston. He declined both appointments.

=== Bishop of Natchez ===
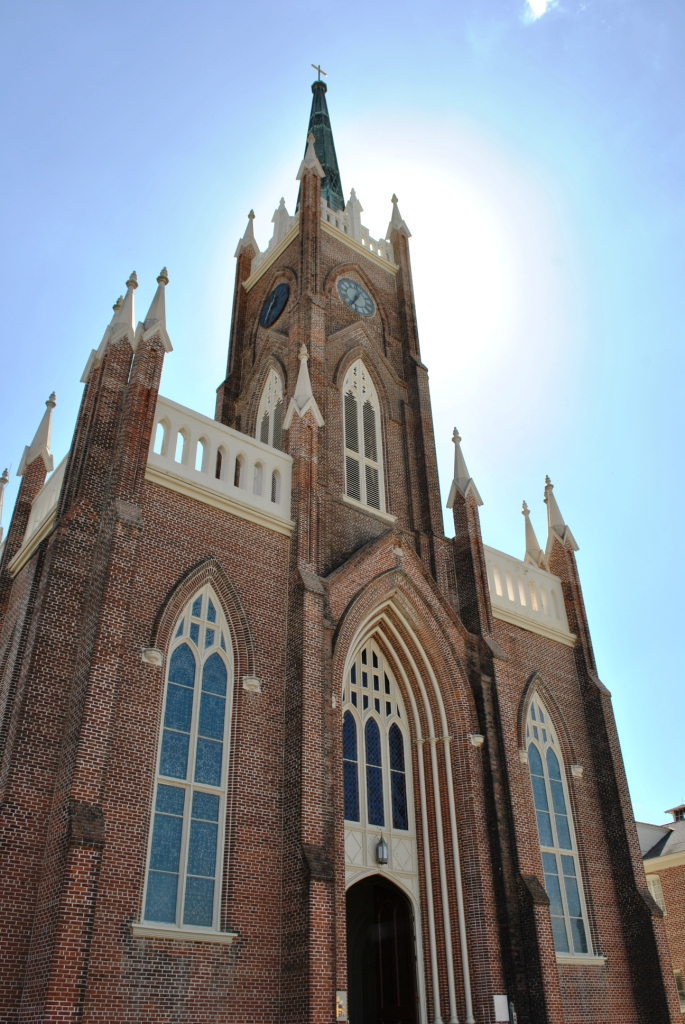
St. Mary Basilica, Natchez, Mississippi (2013)

Chanche was appointed as its first bishop of the new Diocese of Natchez by Pope Gregory XVI on December 15, 1840. Chanche was consecrated on March 14, 1841 by Archbishop Eccleston at the Cathedra of the Assumption of the Blessed Virgin Mary in Baltimore. He was assisted by Bishops Benedict Fenwick and John Hughes.

Arriving at Natchez in May 1841, Chanche met the only priest in the state, Reverend Brogard, who was only there temporarily. Brogard conducted services in the Mechanics' Hall. Taking up the role of a simple missionary, Chanche began to look for the Catholics in the area, organize a diocese and build its infrastructure.

In 1842, Chanche laid the cornerstone of St. Mary Cathedral in Natchez, dedicated to Our Lady of Sorrows. In 1847, he asked the Sisters of Charity of Emmitsburg, Maryland to come to Natchez, where they established Saint Mary's Orphanage. At the First Plenary Council of Baltimore, which opened in Baltimore in May 1852, Chanche served the role of "chief promoter."

=== Death and legacy ===
John Chanche died on July 22, 1852, in Frederick, Maryland, possibly of cholera. He was buried in the Cathedral Cemetery in Baltimore. At the time of his death, the Diocese of Natchez had 11 priests, 11 churches, and 13 attendant missions.

In 2007, the Archdiocese of Baltimore exhumed Chanche's remains and returned them to Natchez. The Diocese of Natchez reinterred them in a special garden near the Shrine of the Immaculate Conception on the grounds of the Basilica of St. Mary.

The Diocese of Jackson established the Bishop John Joseph Chanche Award for service. The awards honor individuals who give of themselves to their parish or faith community. The awards are presented on the weekend closest to the Feast of the Chair of St. Peter, the patronal feast for the diocese.

== See also ==
- Roman Catholic Diocese of Jackson

== Episcopal succession ==
Catholic Church titles
Preceded by none	Bishop of Natchez; 1840–1852	Succeeded by James Oliver Van de Velde
