= Vicksburg Catholic School =

Location
- 1900 Grove Street; Vicksburg, Mississippi 39183; United States; 32°21′0″N 90°52′3″W

Information
- Type: Private school
- Religious affiliation: Roman Catholic
- Established: 1879
- Oversight: Diocese of Jackson
- Superintendent: Karla Luke
- Principal: Dawn Meeks
- Grades: K–12
- Colors: Purple and Gold
- Nickname: Flashes
- Accreditation: Cognia
- Affiliation: National Catholic Educational Association
- Website: www.vicksburgcatholic.org

Vicksburg Catholic School is a private, Roman Catholic high school in Vicksburg, Mississippi. It is located in the Roman Catholic Diocese of Jackson.

It includes the following campuses:

- St. Aloysius High School (middle and high school)
- St. Francis Xavier Elementary School
- Sisters of Mercy Early Learning Center

== History ==
St. Francis Xavier Academy was established in 1860 by the Sisters of Mercy. St. Aloysius was founded in 1879 by the Brothers of the Sacred Heart. In 1906 St. Mary's School was established by Sisters of the Divine Word. Several school consolidations occurred. In 1989 the Catholic schools in Vicksburg administratively merged into a single institution, Vicksburg Catholic School, in 1989.

== Notable alumni ==
- Katherine Bailess, actress
- DeMichael Harris, NFL wide receiver for the Indianapolis Colts
- Eddie Ray - National Football League (NFL) running back
