= John Edward Gunn =

Irish-born prelate

His Excellency, The Right Reverend John Edward Gunn S.M.
- Bishop of Natchez
- Church: Catholic Church
- See: Bishop of Natchez
- In office: August 29, 1911 – February 19, 1924
- Predecessor: Thomas Heslin
- Successor: Richard Oliver Gerow

Orders
- Ordination: February 2, 1890 by Giulio Lenti
- Consecration: August 29, 1911 by James Blenk

Personal details
- Born: March 15, 1863 Fivemiletown, County Tyrone, Ireland
- Died: February 19, 1924 (aged 60) Natchez, Mississippi, US
- Motto: Monstra te essem matrem (Show yourself to be our mother)

Styles of John Edward Gunn
- Reference style: His Excellency; The Most Reverend
- Spoken style: Your Excellency
- Religious style: Bishop

John Edward Gunn S.M. (15 March 1863 – 19 February 1924) was an Irish-born American prelate of the Catholic Church. He served as bishop of Natchez in Mississippi from 1911 until his death in 1924. He was a member of the Society of Mary (Marists)

== Biography ==
=== Early life ===
The oldest of eleven children, John Gunn was born on March 15, 1863, in Fivemiletown, County Tyrone, in Ireland to Edward and Mary (née Grew) Gunn. From 1875 to 1880, he studied at St. Mary's College in Dundalk, Ireland. He then attended the Marist House of Studies in Paignton, England (1880–1882) before furthering his studies in Rome at the Pontifical Gregorian University (1885–1890). While in Rome, Gunn made his profession to the Marists on August 23, 1884.

=== Priesthood ===
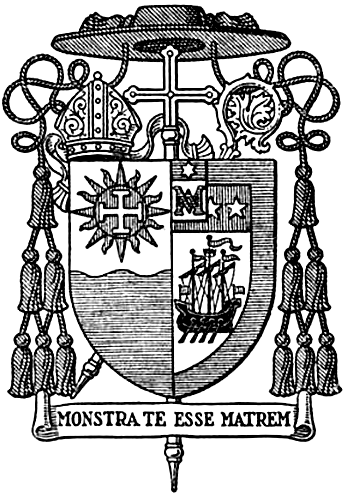
Original drawing of coat of arms, designed by P. de Chaignon la Rose

Gunn was ordained to the priesthood for the Marists in Rome by Patriarch Giulio Lenti on February 2, 1890. After his ordination, the Marists assigned Gunn back to Ireland to teach at St. Mary's College. In 1892, the Marists sent Gunn to the United States to teach moral theology at the Marist House of Studies at the Catholic University of America in Washington, D.C.

In 1898, the Marists sent Gunn to Atlanta, Georgia, to become pastor of the newly erected Sacred Heart Parish. The parish was already in debt when he arrived, as evidenced by an entry he made in his ledger upon his arrival:

"September 25, 1898. Cash on hand $0.00. Advanced by Father Gunn, $150." In February 1899, he advanced the parish an additional $360 to meet expenses.

Gunn later purchased for Sacred Heart an organ and 21 stained glass windows He installed confessionals, furnace, carpeting, and a choir and organ gallery; covered the two towers with copper; and added a second story to the rectory. During his pastorate at Sacred Heart, he also founded and served as the first president of the Marist College, a secondary school in Brookhaven, Georgia. He also established a parochial school.

=== Bishop of Natchez ===
On June 29, 1911, Gunn was appointed the sixth bishop of Natchez by Pope Pius X. He received his episcopal consecration on August 29, 1911, from Archbishop James Blenk, with Bishops Edward Allen and John Morris serving as co-consecrators, at Sacred Heart Church.

Upon Gunn's arrival in Natchez that September, the diocese contained 75 churches, 46 priests, and 17,000 Catholics. He then began extensive pastoral visits to all the parishes and missions throughout the diocese, which covered nearly 47,000 square miles.

He received significant assistance from the Catholic Church Extension Society in Chicago, Illinois, and incorporated the diocese in 1918. He became known as the "Chapel Builder." By the time of his death, there were 149 churches and over 31,000 Catholics in the diocese. In 1915, during World War I, Gunn attended the installation of Bishop George Mundelein as archbishop of Detroit. At a banquet dinner in that city after the ceremony a German spy allegedly laced the soup with arsenic. Gunn and four others suffered from poisoning, but he survived. Following the end of World War I, the Vatican considered appointing him as archbishop of New Orleans, but he refused the efforts.

=== Death ===
By January 1924, his failing health left him in critical condition. John Gunn died on February 19, 1924, in Natchez, from a heart attack at age 60. He was buried beside his predecessor, Bishop Thomas Heslin. In his will, Gunn states,

"In life and in death I am proud of three things: My Irish birth, my Catholic faith, and my American citizenship. I tried to translate my love for all three into service and sacrifice".

Catholic Church titles
Preceded by Thomas Heslin	Bishop of Natchez; 1911–1924	Succeeded by Richard Oliver Gerow
