= Cathedral School (Natchez, Mississippi) =

Location
- 701 N. Martin Luther King St. Natchez, (Adams County, Mississippi), Mississippi 39120; United States
- Coordinates: 31°33′43″N 91°23′41″W

Information
- Type: Private, Coeducational
- Religious affiliation: Roman Catholic
- Established: 1847; 179 years ago
- Principal: Kimberly Burkley- Head of School / Elementary Principal Whest Shirley Middle & High School Principal
- Grades: Pre K3- 12
- Campus size: 22 acres (89,000 m^{2})
- Colors: Green and White
- Mascot: Tubby
- Nickname: Greenies
- Team name: Green wave
- Accreditation: Southern Association of Colleges and Schools
- Affiliation: National Catholic Educational Association
- Website: www.cathedralgreenwave.com

Cathedral Catholic School is a private, Catholic institution offering education from Pre-K 3 through 12th grade, located in Natchez, Mississippi. It is part of the Roman Catholic Diocese of Jackson. The school provides a faith-based curriculum that integrates academic excellence with Catholic teachings, ensuring students receive a well-rounded education from early childhood through high school.

== Background ==
Founded in 1847, Cathedral Catholic School has a rich history, established just five years after the creation of Mississippi's first Catholic Diocese and Catholic Church. For 160 years, the school has remained in continuous operation. Initially staffed by the Daughters of Charity, they served at Cathedral until 2003.

Previously a member of the Mississippi High School Activities Association (MHSAA), Cathedral was primarily classified as a 1A school. In 2015, however, the school, along with Vicksburg Catholic School and St. Joseph Catholic School in Greenville, transitioned to the Midsouth Association of Independent Schools. This change followed the MHSAA's decision to prohibit member schools from recruiting student-athletes from outside Mississippi.
