= Thomas Heslin =

Irish-born prelate

His Excellency, The Right Reverend Thomas Heslin
- Bishop of Natchez
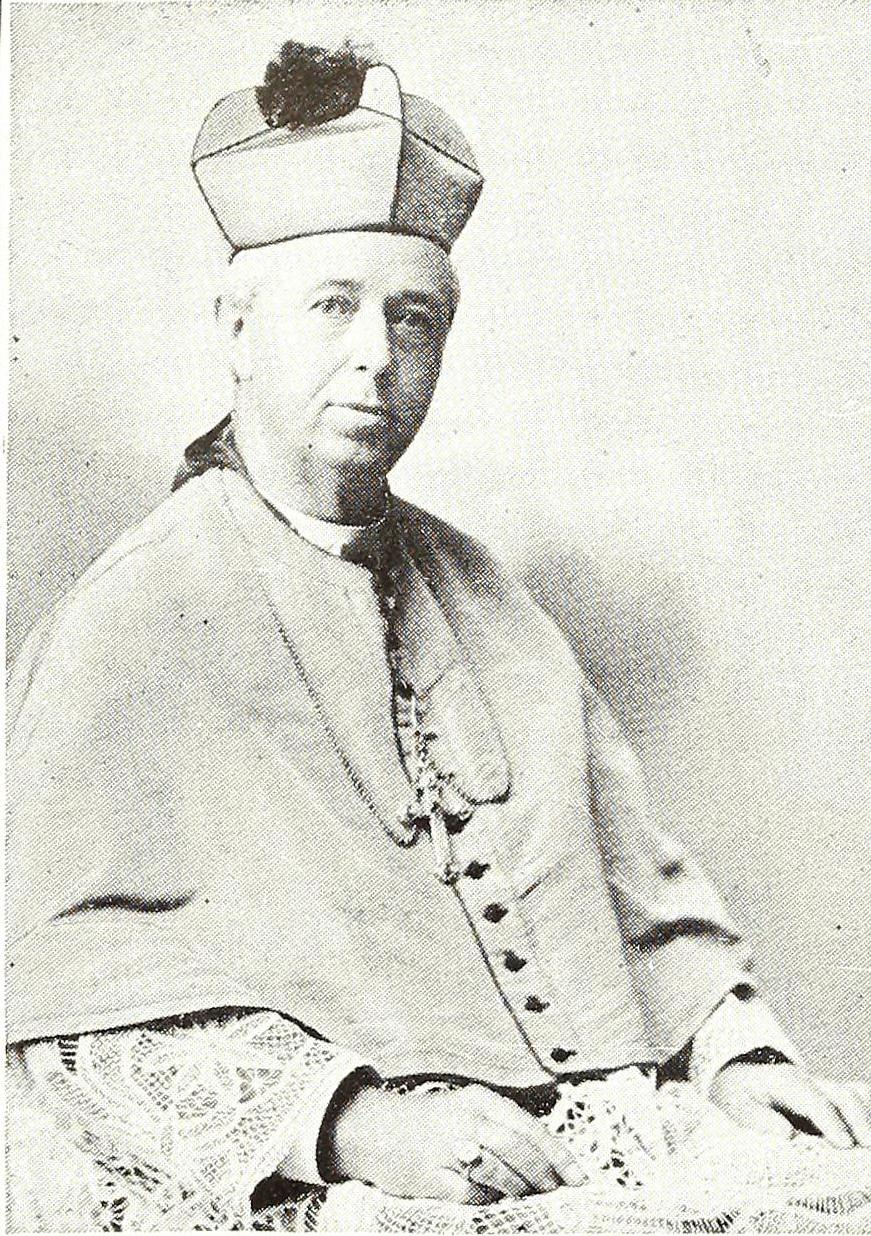
- Church: Catholic
- Diocese: Diocese of Natchez
- Appointed: March 29, 1889
- Predecessor: Francis Janssens
- Successor: John Edward Gunn

Orders
- Ordination: September 8, 1869 by John Quinlan
- Consecration: June 18, 1889 by Francis Janssens

Personal details
- Born: December 21, 1845 Killoe, Ireland
- Died: February 22, 1911 (aged 65) Natchez, Mississippi, US
- Motto: Jesus Maria (Jesus Mary)

Styles of Thomas Heslin
- Reference style: His Excellency; The Most Reverend
- Spoken style: Your Excellency
- Religious style: Bishop

Thomas Heslin (April 17, 1847 – February 22, 1911) was an Irish-born prelate of the Roman Catholic Church who served as bishop of the Diocese of Natchez in Mississippi from 1889 until his death in 1911.

== Biography ==
=== Early life ===
One of seven children, Thomas Heslin was born on April 17, 1847, in Killoe, County Longford, to Patrick and Catherine (née Hughes) Heslin. Upon the completion of his classical studies in Granard, Ireland, he came to the United States at the invitation of Archbishop Jean-Marie Odin in 1863. Heslin then studied theology and philosophy under the Lazarists at diocesan seminary of New Orleans. Too young to receive ordination, he taught at Jefferson College for several years.

=== Priesthood ===
Heslin was ordained to the priesthood for the Archdiocese of St. Louis in Mobile, Alabama, by Bishop John Quinlan on September 8, 1869. After his ordination, the archdiocese assigned Heslin as a curate at the Cathedral of St. Louis Parish in St. Louis, Missouri, for a month. He was then transferred to St. Vincent de Paul Parish and later to St. Patrick's Parish, both in St. Louis. From 1874 to 1889, he was pastor of St. Michael's Church in New Orleans.

=== Bishop of Natchez ===
On March 29, 1889, Heslin was appointed the fifth bishop of Natchez by Pope Leo XIII. He received his episcopal consecration at St. Louis Cathedral in New Orleans on June 18, 1889, from Archbishop Francis Janssens, with Bishops Edward Fitzgerald and Anthony Durier serving as co-consecrators.

Thomas Heslin died in Natchez, Mississippi, on February 22, 1911, at age 65.

Catholic Church titles
Preceded by Francis Janssens	Bishop of Natchez; 1889–1911	Succeeded by John Edward Gunn
