= Cathedral of St. Peter the Apostle (Jackson, Mississippi) =

Cathedral of Saint Peter the Apostle
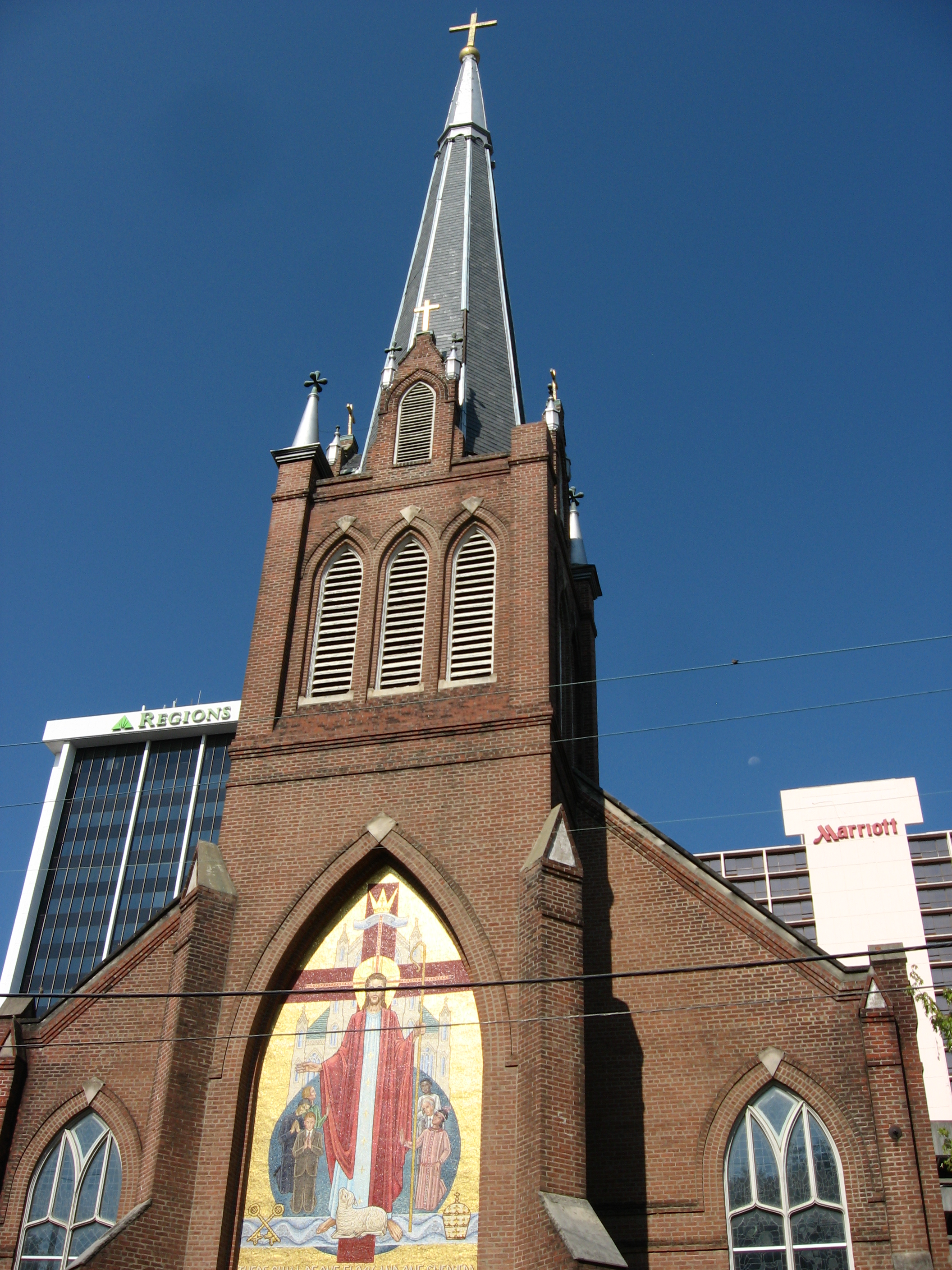
- Cathedral of Saint Peter the Apostle
- 32°18′04″N 90°11′03″W
- Location: 123 North West Street; Jackson, Mississippi
- Country: United States
- Denomination: Roman Catholic Church
- Website: cathedralsaintpeter.org

History
- Founded: August 23, 1846
- Dedicated: June 3, 1900

Architecture
- Style: Neo-Gothic
- Groundbreaking: 1897
- Completed: 1900

Specifications
- Materials: Brick

Administration
- Diocese: Diocese of Jackson

Clergy
- Bishop: Most Rev. Joseph R. Kopacz
- Rector: Very Rev. Nick Adam

The Cathedral Church of Saint Peter the Apostle is the seat of the Bishop of the Roman Catholic Diocese of Jackson, Mississippi. The cathedral is named for Saint Peter the Apostle.

== History ==
The Diocese of Natchez was created July 28, 1837, and included all of Mississippi. In 1841, Bishop John J. Chanche arrived in Natchez and set out to construct parishes. The Mississippi legislature granted land to several congregations in Jackson and Bishop Chanche dedicated the new Catholic church at Court and President Streets to Saint Peter the Apostle on August 23, 1846.

The wood-frame church was burned during the Civil War by General William Tecumseh Sherman in 1862 and the congregation met in various locations around the city. A second structure also burned. Work on the current structure began in 1897 and it was dedicated June 3, 1900. It is constructed in a modified Gothic design of brick with a cruciform floor plan. The front facade features a square tower topped with a spire that reaches a height of 119 ft (36 m).

In 1948, the administrative center of the Diocese of Natchez was transferred to Jackson and the see was renamed the Diocese of Natchez-Jackson. In February 1957, the church was raised to the rank of co-cathedral and when part of the territory was split to form the Diocese of Biloxi in 1977, St. Peter's was named as cathedral of the Diocese of Jackson.

In 1987, the church's Kilgen organ was replaced with a two-manual/25 stop (38 rank) instrument by Rieger Orgelbau of Austria. The organ is dedicated to the memory of Bishop Joseph Brunini, who served from 1968 to 1984.

The cathedral was renovated in the 1980s, and in 1998, an activities building to house offices, a parish hall and classrooms was added in a style that blends with the design of the church. In 2010, the church underwent major renovations. The steeple was rebuilt and sheathed in copper and slate, and capped with a new cross. The roof of the main building was repaired and brick was tuckpointed. Stained glass windows and their frames were cleaned, sealed and covered with protective glass and electrical and sound systems were upgraded. Earlier inspections of the tower and steeple revealed dry rot, leaks, termite damage and other structural problems which were made worse by damage sustained during Hurricane Katrina in 2005.

The Cathedral of Saint Peter the Apostle is the seat of the Bishop of Jackson, Mississippi, and holds daily and weekly masses in English and Spanish.

== Gallery ==
A gallery of photographs of the 2008 Midnight mass at The Cathedral of Saint Peter the Apostle

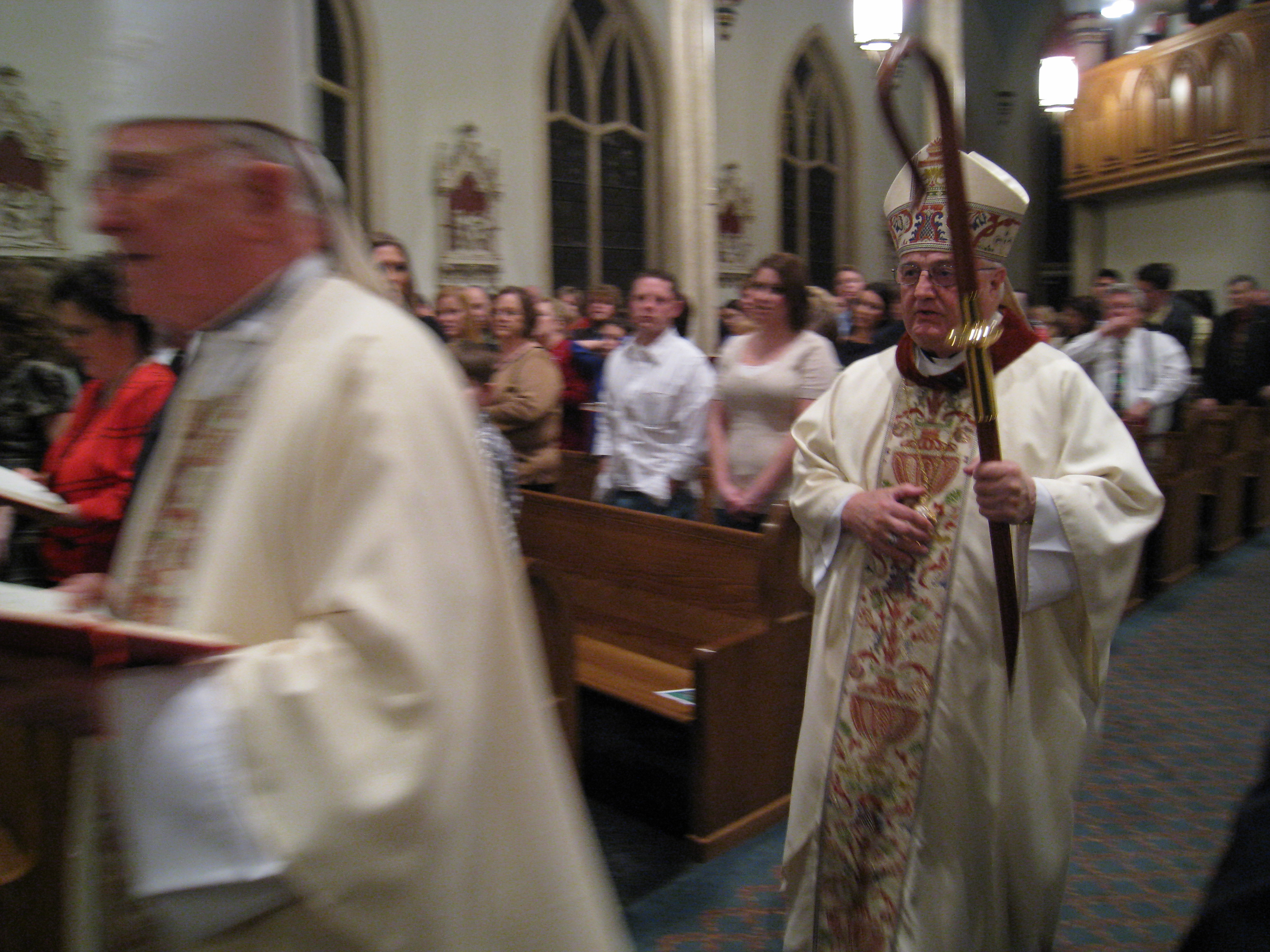
Procession

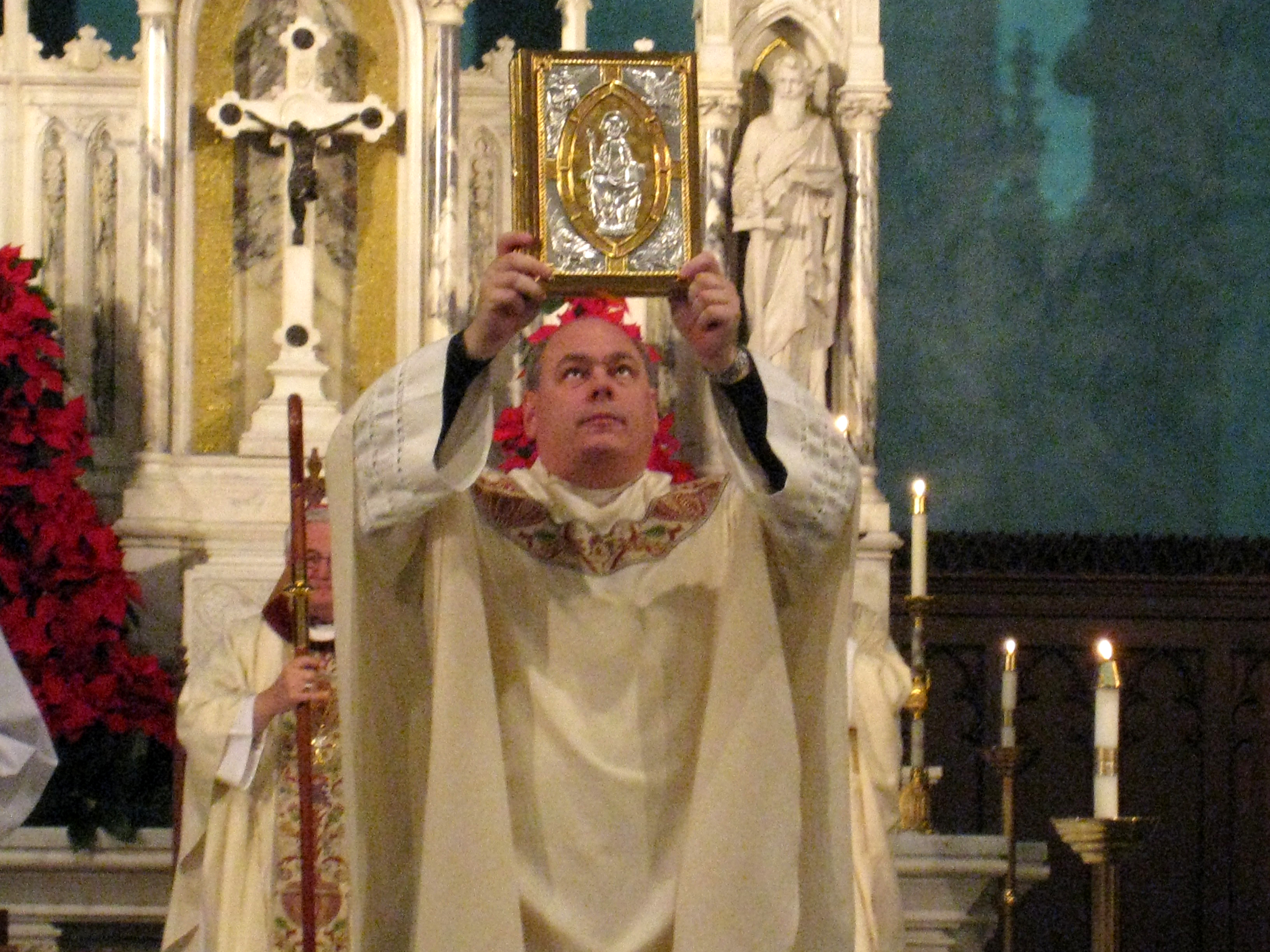
Book of the Gospels

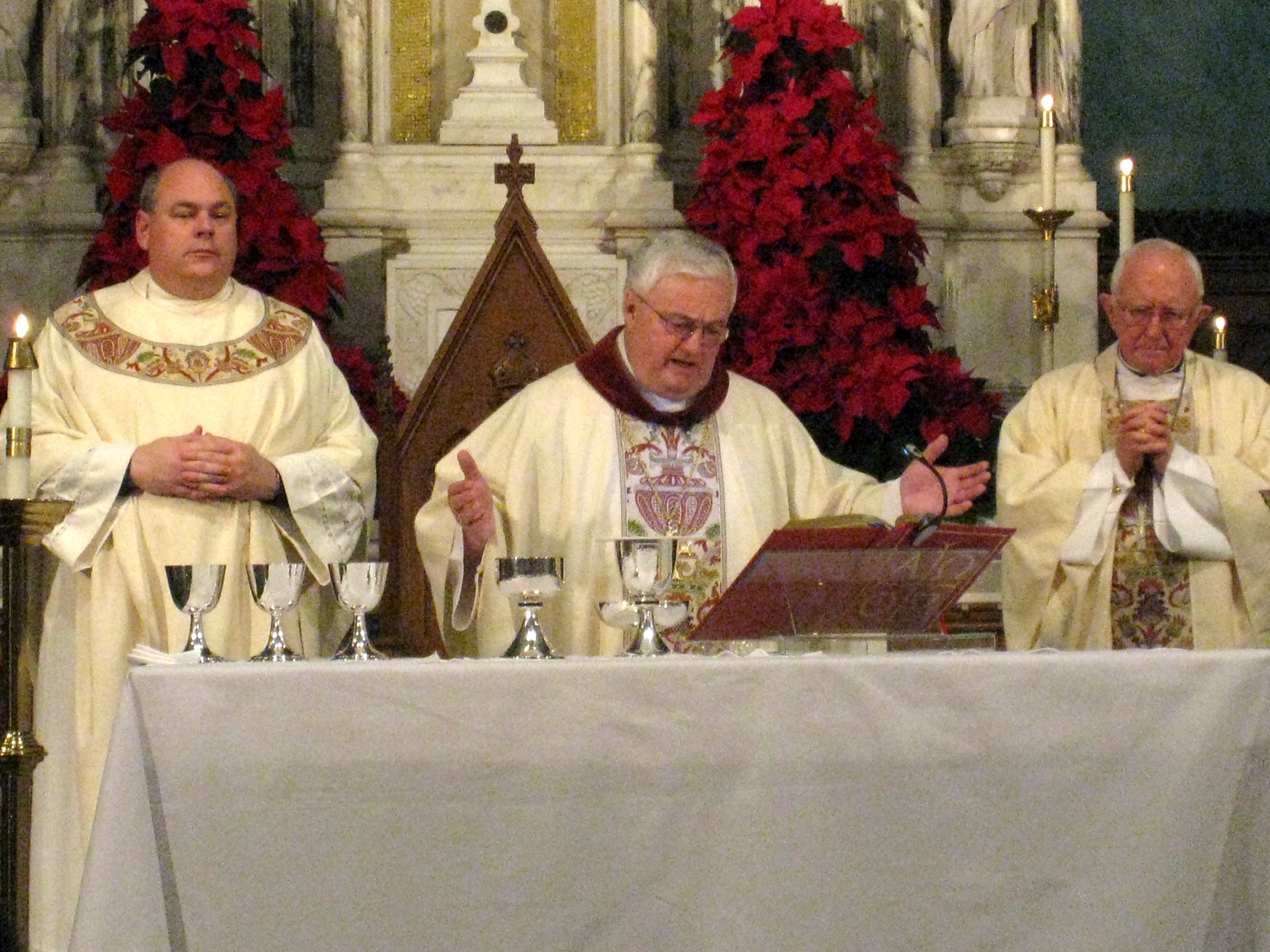
Eucharistic Prayer

== See also ==
- List of Catholic cathedrals in the United States
- List of cathedrals in the United States
