= St. Mary Basilica, Natchez =

St. Mary Basilica
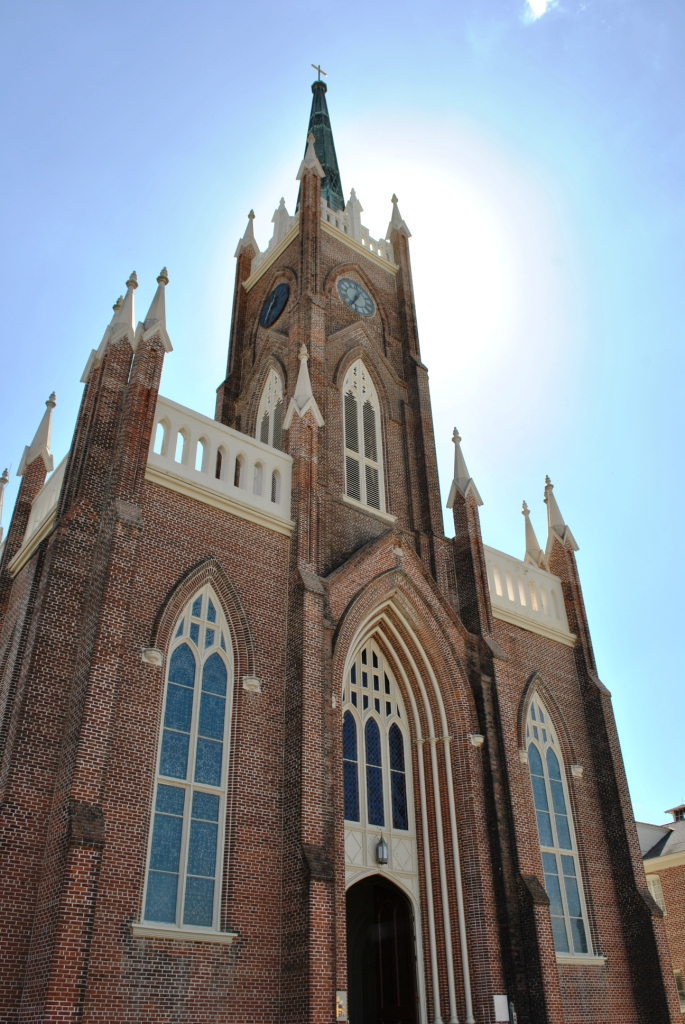
- St. Mary Basilica
- 31°33′30.96″N 91°24′4.32″W
- Location: 107 S. Union St. Natchez, Mississippi
- Country: United States
- Denomination: Catholic Church
- Website: www.stmarybasilica.org
- St. Mary's Cathedral
- U.S. Historic district – Contributing property
- Location within Mississippi Location within the United States
- Part of: Natchez On-Top-of-the-Hill Historic District (ID79003381)
- Added to NRHP: September 17, 1979

History
- Former name: St. Mary's Cathedral
- Founded: 1842

Architecture
- Architect: James Hardie
- Style: Gothic Revival
- Completed: 1882

Administration
- Diocese: Jackson

Clergy
- Rector: Very Rev. Aaron M. Williams

St. Mary Basilica, formerly St. Mary's Cathedral, is a Catholic church in Natchez, Mississippi, and a parish church in the Diocese of Jackson. It was dedicated to the Virgin Mary under the title Our Lady of Sorrows on December 25, 1843.

In 1979, it was listed under its former name as a contributing property in the Natchez On-Top-of-the-Hill Historic District on the National Register of Historic Places. It was named a minor basilica in 1998.

== History ==
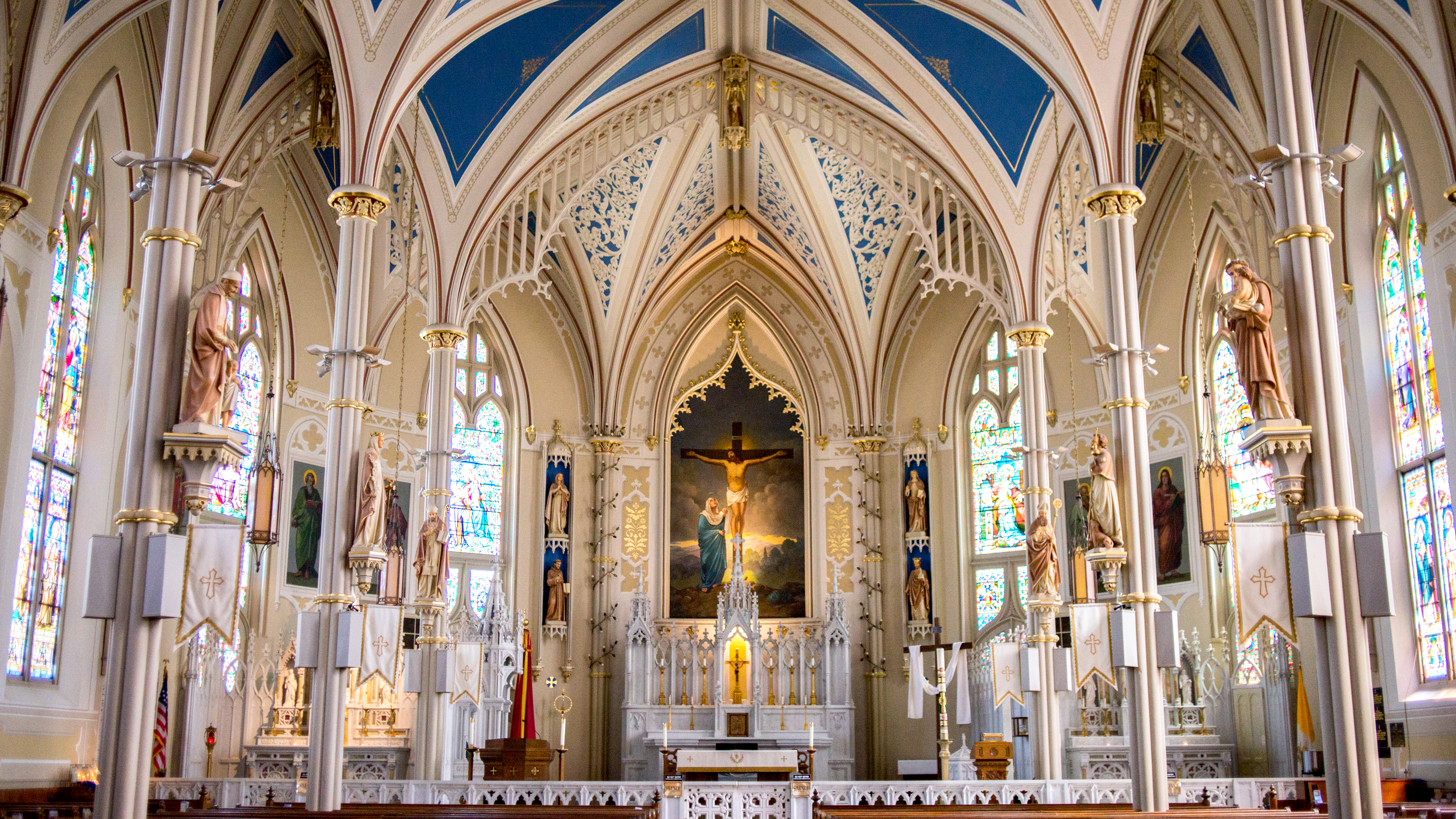
Interior

The Diocese of Natchez (now the Diocese of Jackson) was erected in 1837, and in 1842, construction began on a new cathedral. It was dedicated on December 25, 1843, but the diocese had to wait until 1882 for the building to be completed, forty years after construction commenced. The building was consecrated on September 19, 1886, and remained the cathedral of the diocese until 1977. It was designated a minor basilica on September 8, 1998, and dedicated as such on September 25, 1999.

In 2007, the body of Bishop John J. Chanche, S.S., the first Catholic bishop of Mississippi, was exhumed from a Baltimore, Maryland, Catholic cemetery and returned to Natchez to be reinterred in St. Mary Basilica's church yard.

== Architecture ==
Our Lady of Sorrows was designed by Baltimore architect Robert Cary Long Jr.; the supervising architect was James Hardie. It is similar to Long's contemporary Church of St. Alphonsus in Baltimore. The brick structure is two stories tall and was constructed on a partially raised basement. It features a semi-circular apsidal end, ornamental pinnacles, and buttresses. The central square tower that is capped with a spire is embedded into the structure, and it has a recessed Gothic-arched entrance. The tower is topped with pinnacles.

The original organ is H. Pilcher and Sons, dating to 1882. The Basilica underwent some restoration after sustaining damage in a tornado.

== See also ==
- List of Catholic cathedrals in the United States
- List of cathedrals in the United States
