= Gerow =

Gerow may refer to:

== People ==
Notable people with the surname of Gerow include:

- Aaron Gerow (born c. 1964), American historian of Japanese cinema
- Brenda Gerow (1960–1981), American murder victim, previously known as Pima County Jane Doe
- Charlie Gerow (contemporary), American political consultant
- Lee S. Gerow (1891–1982), United States Army General, brother of Leonard T. Gerow
- Leonard T. Gerow (1888–1972), United States Army General, brother of Lee S. Gerow
- Richard Oliver Gerow (1885–1976), American Roman Catholic bishop

See also

- Thomas Gerow Murphy (1883–1971), Canadian politician
- Al Jarreau (1940–2017), American singer and musician

== Places ==
- Dam Gerow Band, a village in Hormozgan Province, Iran
- Gerdeh Gerow, a village in West Azerbaijan Province, Iran
- Garow (disambiguation), various places in Iran
