= St. Michael Catholic High School (Alabama) =

Location
- 11732 Higbee Road; Fairhope, Alabama 36532; United States; 30.553611°N 87.835423°W

Information
- Type: Private high school
- Motto: Forming Scholars, Leaders and Disciples of Jesus Christ
- Religious affiliation: Roman Catholic
- Established: 2016
- Oversight: Roman Catholic Archdiocese of Mobile
- Principal: Andrea Williamson
- Grades: 9–12
- Gender: Co-educational
- Campus size: 80 acres (32 ha)
- Houses: Portier; Quinlan; O'Sullivan; Allen
- Colors: Red and Gray
- Mascot: Cardinal
- Website: www.stmichaelchs.org

St. Michael Catholic High School is a private, Catholic, co-educational high school in Fairhope, Alabama. It was established in 2016 and is located in the Archdiocese of Mobile.

== History ==
The school opened with ninth and tenth grades on August 17, 2016, adding a junior class in 2017 and a senior class in 2018. In 2021, the school achieved its maximum enrollment of 350 students. Faustin Weber was the founding principal, hired in 2015, one year before the school opened.

As part of a voting process the year before the school opened, future students voted between two choices of mascots: the "Sharks" and the "Cardinals." As per the majority, the "Cardinals" was chosen. The school aspires for its students to become "scholars, leaders and disciples of Jesus Christ."

Upon Weber's departure in 2022, Paul Knapstein was named interim principal, and Andrea Williamson was hired as the new principal in 2023.

== Curriculum ==
The school's curriculum allows students to take courses at the Collegiate Studies or Honors/Advanced Placement level. The school requires four years of core subjects in Theology, Math, English, History and Science, one year of Physical Education and a half year of Health. Freshmen and sophomores must also take a foreign language (either Spanish or Latin) and an arts elective (either Chorus, Band or Art). In their junior and senior year, students have three electives in addition to the five core classes. They may opt to take a third or fourth year of a foreign language and/or the Arts among their choices.

Students take eight classes each semester. On Mondays, they attend all eight classes, whereas on Tuesday they attend six classes, with two classes rotating out of the schedule each day. Students may earn a total of 32 credits during their four-year tenure.

The school offers AP classes in Human Geography, American History, English Comp, English Lit, Psychology, Spanish, Government, Calculus and Physics. In 2021, forty-nine students were named AP Scholars by the College Board, including nine "Scholars with Distinction" and 11 "Scholars with Honor."

== Houses ==
The school has a house system in which students are divided into four houses, each named after the early bishops of Mobile: Michael Portier, John Quinlan, Jeremiah O'Sullivan, and Edward Patrick Allen. The houses compete against each other for the Annual 'House Cup' and serve as the foundation for the student council of the school.

== Athletics ==
The school is an AHSAA sponsored school competing at the 4A level. It consists of football, men's and women's basketball, baseball, swimming, cross-country bowling, volleyball, softball, golf, tennis and men's and women's soccer. There is also a cheerleader squad for both the football and basketball teams. The cross-country team was the school's first state championship team in 2019, whereas its cheerleading team won the state championship in 2020. The men's swim team finished second in 2019.

In the spring of 2020, the school announced that Philip Rivers, then-quarterback of the Indianapolis Colts, would be its future football coach upon Rivers’ retirement from the NFL. He retired after the 2020 season and became the school's coach in March 2021. The school opened a new all-sports field house in March 2021, which includes a weight room, locker rooms, coaching and physical training offices, and a multimedia room.
