= Garow =

Garow or Garu or Garru or Gerow or Geru (Persian: گرو or گارو) may refer to the following places in Iran:

- Garow, Fars, Fars province
- Garu Rural District, Golestan province
- Geru, Bandar Abbas, Hormozgan province
- Garu, Byaban, Hormozgan province
- Garu, Minab, Hormozgan province
- Geru Siah, Hormozgan province
- Garu, Qaleh Ganj, Kerman province (گارو - Gārū)
- Garu, Sabzevar, Razavi Khorasan province
- Garow, South Khorasan, South Khorasan province

It may also refer to:

- Geru (river), a river in southeastern Romania
