= Dominic Manucy =

American prelate (1823–1885)

His Excellency, The Right Reverend Dominic Manucy
- Vicar Apostolic of Brownsville; Titular Bishop of Maronea
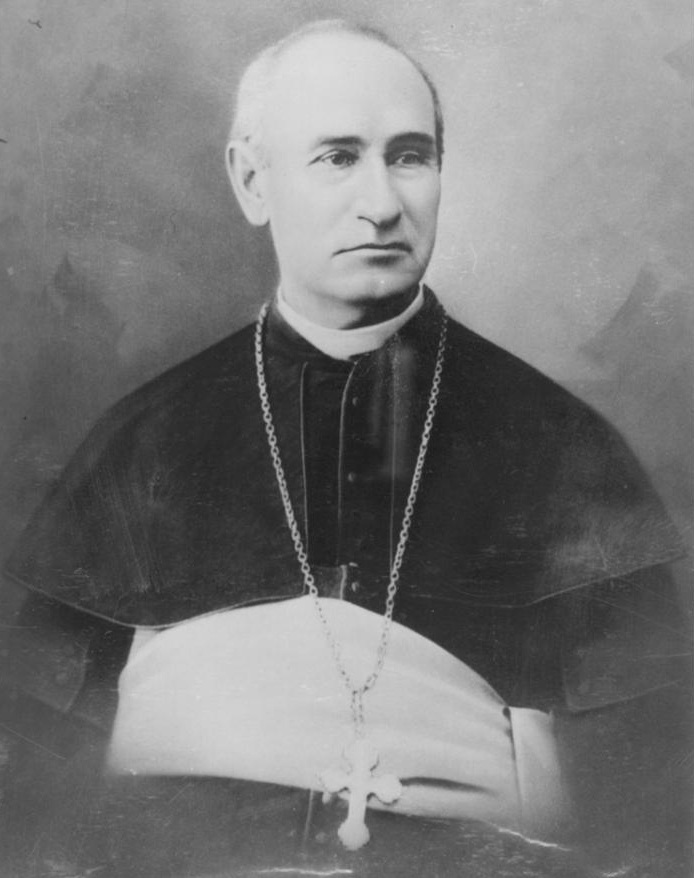
- Church: Catholic Church
- Diocese: Vicariate Apostolic of Brownsville
- Appointed: September 18, 1874
- Term ended: December 4, 1885 (his death)
- Predecessor: Office established
- Successor: Peter Verdaguer y Prat
- Other post: Bishop of Mobile (March to September 1884)

Orders
- Ordination: August 15, 1850 by Michael Portier
- Consecration: December 8, 1874 by Napoléon-Joseph Perché

Personal details
- Born: December 20, 1823 St. Augustine, Florida Territory, US
- Died: December 4, 1885 (aged 61) Mobile, Alabama, US
- Motto: In hoc signo vinces (By this sign, you will conquer)

Dominic Manucy (December 20, 1823 – December 7, 1885) was an American prelate of the Catholic Church. He served as the first vicar apostolic of Brownsville in Texas (later the Diocese of Corpus Christi) from 1874 until he died in 1885. He also served as the third bishop of Mobile in Alabama for several months in 1884.

== Biography ==
=== Early life ===
Dominic Manucy was born on December 20, 1823, in St. Augustine in Florida Territory, the son of Pedro Manucy and Maria Lorenzo. His grandfather, Josef Manucy, came to Florida from the Spanish island of Menorca as an indentured servant, working at the settlement of British diplomat Andrew Turnbull in New Smyrna. Conditions were so abysmal at New Smyrna that the settlers rebelled against Turnbull and moved to St. Augustine. One of Josef's other descendants was the historian Albert Manucy (1910–1997).

Dominic Manucy was raised with his second cousin, Anthony Dominic Pellicer, the future bishop of the Diocese of Antonio. He and Pellicer studied for the priesthood together at Spring Hill College in Mobile, Alabama.

=== Priesthood ===
Manucy was ordained by Bishop Michael Portier for the Diocese of Mobile on August 15, 1850. At that time, the diocese included the new State of Florida as well as Alabama. After his ordination, the diocese assigned Manucy to work at the missions in Warrington and Apalachicola, Florida. In 1855, he was appointed assistant pastor of Immaculate Conception Cathedral Parish in Mobile, Alabama. Manucy was named pastor in 1861 of St. Vincent's Parish in Mobile. In 1865, he succeeded Pellicer as pastor of St. Peter's Parish in Montgomery, Alabama.

=== Vicar Apostolic of Brownsville ===
On September 18, 1874, Manucy was appointed the first vicar apostolic of Brownsville and titular bishop of Dulma by Pope Pius IX. Manucy received his episcopal consecration on December 8, 1874, from Archbishop Napoléon-Joseph Perché at the Cathedral of the Immaculate Conception in Mobile. Manucy was formally installed in Brownsville, Texas, on February 11, 1875.

The new vicariate covered the territory between the Nueces River and the Rio Grande in Texas. It contained a Catholic population of about 40,000 people being served by the Oblate Fathers. Due to unrest in Brownsville, Manucy established his residence in Corpus Christi, Texas. He constructed a new St. Patrick's Church in Corpus Christi that in 1882 became the first St. Patrick Cathedral. During his tenure in the vicariate, Manucy ordained five priests, established three convents and recruited religious orders like the Sisters of the Incarnate Word. He also constructed nine churches, with three more under construction by the time of his death.

=== Bishop of Mobile ===
On January 18, 1884, Manucy was named bishop of Mobile by Pope Leo XIII. However, Manucy was to remain in charge of the Apostolic Vicariate of Brownsville until the pope named a successor there. He was installed in Mobile on March 30, 1884.

By the summer of 1884, Manucy's health had deteriorated so much that he submitted his resignation as bishop of Mobile to the Vatican. However, it was rejected by Cardinal Giovanni Simeoni. Manucy asked again a few months later and his resignation as bishop was accepted on September 27, 1884. He still remained the vicar apostolic of Brownsville. Manucy attended the third Plenary Council of Baltimore, a meeting of all the bishops in the United States, from November to December 1884.

=== Death ===
Manucy was re-appointed vicar Apostolic of Brownsville by Leo XIII on February 7, 1885, with the titular see of Maronea. However, his illness prevented him from returning to Texas. Manucy died in Mobile on December 4, 1885, at age 61. He is buried in the crypt of Immaculate Conception Cathedral.

== Episcopal succession ==
Catholic Church titles
Preceded by John Quinlan	Bishop of Mobile; 1884–1884	Succeeded by Jeremiah O'Sullivan
Preceded by None	Vicar Apostolic of Brownsville; 1874—1884	Succeeded by Peter Verdaguer y Prat
Preceded by Balthasar Schitter	Titular Bishop of Duvno; 1874—1884	Succeeded by Cyryl Lubowidzki Paškal Buconjić (in 1881 as the bishop of Mostar-Duvno)
