= Garu =

Garu may refer to:

== People ==
- Moses Garu (born 1969), Solomon Islands politician

== Places ==
- Akhurian River, also known as Garu, a river in the South Caucasus
- Garu, Ghana, town in northeastern Ghana
- Garu, Iran (disambiguation), various places in Iran
- Garu, Pakistan, village of NWFP, Pakistan

== Fictional characters ==
- Garu, a character from Pucca series
- Garu, a character from Uchu Sentai Kyuranger

== See also ==
- Gyaru, a Japanese fashion subculture, whose name is a transliteration of "gal"
