= Richard Oliver Gerow =

American Roman Catholic bishop

His Excellency, The Most Reverend Richard Oliver Gerow
- Bishop of Natchez-Jackson; Titular Bishop of Vageata
- See: Diocese of Natchez-Jackson
- In office: June 25, 1924 – December 2, 1967
- Predecessor: John Edward Gunn
- Successor: Joseph Bernard Brunini

Orders
- Ordination: June 5, 1909 by Pietro Respighi
- Consecration: October 15, 1924, by Edward Patrick Allen

Personal details
- Born: May 3, 1885 Mobile, Alabama, US
- Died: December 20, 1976 (aged 91) Jackson, Mississippi, US
- Education: Mount St. Mary's College; Pontifical North American College
- Motto: In te Domine speravi (In you, oh Lord, I have placed my trust)

Styles of Richard Oliver Gerow
- Reference style: His Excellency; The Most Reverend
- Spoken style: Your Excellency
- Religious style: Bishop

Richard Oliver Gerow (May 3, 1885 – December 20, 1976) was an American prelate of the Roman Catholic Church. He served as bishop of the Diocese of Natchez-Jackson in Mississippi from 1924 to 1967.

== Biography ==
=== Early life ===
Richard Gerow was born on May 3, 1885, in Mobile, Alabama, one of two children of Warren Rosencranz and Annie A. (née Skehan) Gerow. Warren Rosencranz, a native of Mobile and convert to Catholicism, built floats for Mardi Gras in Mobile for the Order of Myths. Annie Gerow was born in County Tipperary, Ireland, and immigrated to the United States with her family in 1863. Following Warren's death in 1894, Annie supported the family by renting out small cottages and establishing a dressmaking business.

Gerow was educated by a private tutor before attending Cathedral Grammar School in Mobile. He then attended McGill Institute in Mobile from 1897 until 1901, when he enrolled at Mount St. Mary's College in Emmitsburg, Maryland. Gerow graduated from Mount St. Mary's in 1904 with a Bachelor of Arts degree, and then began his studies for the priesthood at the Pontifical North American College in Rome. He earned a Doctor of Sacred Theology degree in 1909.

=== Priesthood ===
On June 5, 1909, Gerow was ordained a priest for the Diocese of Mobile by Cardinal Pietro Respighi at the Basilica of St. John Lateran in Rome. Gerow celebrated his first mass in the catacombs of Rome. Following his return to the United States, the diocese assigned Gerow as temporary administrator of St. Joseph's Parish in Pensacola, Florida, where he remained for one month. He then returned to Mobile, where he served as a curate at the Cathedral of the Immaculate Conception Parish and pro-chancellor of the diocese. He later served as chancellor of the diocese until 1920, when he became rector of the Cathedral of the Immaculate Conceptionin Mobile.

=== Bishop of Natchez and Natchez-Jackson ===
On June 25, 1924, Gerow was appointed the seventh bishop of Natchez by Pope Pius XI. He received his episcopal consecration on October 15, 1924, from Bishop Edward Allen, with Bishops Jules Jeanmard and James Griffin serving as co-consecrators, at the Cathedral of the Immaculate Conception. His installation took place at St. Mary's Cathedral in Natchez, Mississippi, on November 12, 1924. Gerow was named an assistant at the pontifical throne by Pope Pius XII on October 3, 1949.

During his 43-year tenure, Gerow oversaw an extensive renovation of St. Mary's Cathedral, held biannual clerical conferences, and worked to established Confraternity of Christian Doctrine programs in every parish of the diocese. He moved the episcopal see of the diocese from Natchez to Jackson, Mississippi, in 1948. On December 18, 1956, Pope Pius XII transformed the Diocese of Natchez into the Diocese of Natchez-Jackson, with Gerow remaining as bishop.

In 1963, Gerow condemned the assassination of the civil rights activist Medgar Evers in Mississippi, saying, "We need frankly to admit that the guilt for the murder and the other instances of violence in our community tragically must be shared by all of us." The following year, he ordered Catholic elementary schools in Mississippi to admit students to the first grade "without regard to race." In 1965, Gerow ordered the racial desegregation of all grades in Catholic schools, in order to "bring our practice into full conformity with the teachings of Christ."

Gerow served as episcopal moderator of the National Catholic Committee on Scouting from 1941 to 1961 and was awarded the Silver Buffalo Award by the Boy Scouts of America in 1954.

=== Retirement and legacy ===
On December 2, 1967, Pope Paul VI accepted Gerow's resignation as bishop of Natchez-Jackson; he was appointed titular bishop of Vageata by the pope on the same date. He resigned his titular see on January 5, 1971. Richard Gerow died at St. Dominic's Hospital in Jackson on December 20, 1976, at age 91.

Catholic Church titles
| Preceded by – | Bishop of Natchez-Jackson; 1956–1967 | Succeeded by Joseph Bernard Brunini |
| Preceded by John Edward Gunn | Bishop of Natchez; 1924–1956 | Succeeded by – (Titular see) |
