= Thomas Joseph Toolen =

American clergyman

The Most Reverend Thomas Joseph Toolen
- Bishop of Mobile
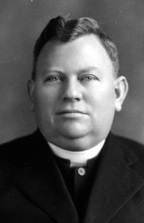
- Thomas Joseph Toolen about the time of his episcopal consecration
- See: Mobile
- Installed: February 28, 1927
- Term ended: September 29, 1969
- Predecessor: Edward Patrick Allen
- Successor: John L. May

Orders
- Ordination: September 27, 1910
- Consecration: May 4, 1927

Personal details
- Born: February 28, 1886 Baltimore, Maryland
- Died: December 4, 1976 (aged 90) Mobile, Alabama
- Denomination: Roman Catholic Church

Thomas Joseph Toolen (February 28, 1886 – December 4, 1976) was an American clergyman of the Roman Catholic Church. He served as Bishop of Mobile from 1927 to 1969, and was given the personal title of Archbishop in 1954.

== Early life and education ==
Thomas Joseph Toolen was born in Baltimore, Maryland, one of six children of Thomas and Mary (née Dowd) Toolen. His parents were both natives of County Roscommon, Ireland, and his father died in 1897. Toolen received his early education at the parochial school of Our Lady of Good Counsel Church, and attended Loyola High School and Loyola College.

When he first told his mother he wanted to enter the priesthood at age 12, she expressed her doubt but finally agreed to send Thomas to a seminary when he came of age. He made his theological studies at St. Mary's Seminary in Baltimore.

== Priesthood ==
On September 27, 1910, Joseph Toolen was ordained a priest by Cardinal James Gibbons at the Cathedral of the Assumption. He then went to study canon law at the Catholic University of America in Washington, D.C., where he earned a Bachelor's degree in 1912. His first assignment was as a curate at St. Bernard Church in Baltimore, where he remained until he was named archdiocesan director of the Society for the Propagation of the Faith in 1925.

== Episcopacy ==
On February 28, 1927, his forty-first birthday, Toolen was appointed the sixth Bishop of Mobile, Alabama, by Pope Pius XI. He received his episcopal consecration on the following May 4 from Archbishop Michael Joseph Curley, with Bishops Michael Joseph Keyes, S.M., and Richard Oliver Gerow serving as co-consecrators, at the Cathedral of the Assumption in Baltimore. Toolen arrived in the Diocese of Mobile, which then comprised the entire state of Alabama and the northwestern part of Florida, on the following May 18.

In connection with the centennial celebration of the diocese, he erected Allen Memorial Hospital in honor of his predecessor, Bishop Edward Patrick Allen, in December 1929. In 1941, Toolen prohibited Catholic parents who sent their children to public schools from receiving the sacraments. He explained, "The Catholic system of education has been the greatest boon this country has ever known. We are prepared to take care of our children from the first grade to the university...Catholic parents must send their children to the Catholic school. Parents who do not obey are rebellious and should be treated as such."

He was named an Assistant at the Pontifical Throne in October 1949. On May 27, 1954, the Diocese of Mobile was renamed the Diocese of Mobile-Birmingham and Toolen was given the personal title of "Archbishop". Between 1962 and 1965, he attended all four sessions of the Second Vatican Council.

=== Relationship with African Americans ===
Toolen opened several new churches, orphanages, hospitals, and other institutions that were meant to minister exclusively to African Americans, leading opponents to call him "the nigger bishop". In 1950, he oversaw construction of St. Martin de Porres Hospital in Mobile, which was the first hospital in Alabama where African American doctors could work alongside their white colleagues. He also persuaded a local hospital to become the first one in Alabama to accept pregnant African American women. In 1948, however, he denied the request of Joseph Lawson Howze to be accepted as a seminarian for the Diocese of Mobile.

In 1957, Toolen invited Mother Angelica and the Poor Clares of Perpetual Adoration to establish a religious community for African Americans in the Diocese of Mobile. He broke ground on Our Lady of the Angels Monastery in Irondale on July 24, 1961, and dedicated the monastery on May 20, 1962. From this monastery would sprout an international broadcasting corporation known as Eternal Word Television Network.

Toolen rose to national prominence during the civil rights movement. In 1964, he ended racial segregation in Catholic schools throughout Alabama. He wrote, "After much prayer, consultation and advice, we have decided to integrate all the schools of the diocese. I know this will not meet with the approval of many of our people, but in justice and charity, this must be done. I ask all of our people to accept this decision as best for God and country." However, he publicly denounced the methods of the activists, speaking in favor of a more non-confrontational approach to civil rights. In 1965, Toolen ordered the Society of Saint Edmund to remove the Rev. Maurice Ouellet because he had let his rectory serve as a headquarters for the Selma marchers.

== Later life and death ==
At age 83, Toolen resigned as Bishop of Mobile on September 29, 1969, after over forty years of service. On the same date, he was appointed Titular Archbishop of Glastonbury by Pope Paul VI. He died in his sleep seven years later, aged 90.

His funeral Mass was held at the Cathedral of the Immaculate Conception on December 9, 1976. Archbishop Fulton J. Sheen, who delivered the eulogy, praised Toolen for "talking about human rights long before there was talk of civil rights." He is buried in the crypt of Immaculate Conception Cathedral.

== Legacy ==
He established Bishop Toolen High School, in Mobile, Alabama, in 1928. Toolen Hall, on the campus of Spring Hill College, is named in his honor. One of the first projects envisioned by Archbishop Thomas Joseph Toolen when he was assigned to the former Mobile-Birmingham Diocese in 1927 was the establishment of a Catholic high school in the Birmingham area.

Toolen is also remembered for his opposition to the use of English in Eastern Catholic liturgical services. His prohibition against Eastern Catholic and bi-ritual priests celebrating the Divine Liturgy in English was reversed by the Holy See on March 31, 1960, at the request of Melkite Catholic Patriarch Maximos IV.

== Episcopal succession ==
Catholic Church titles
| Preceded by Edward Patrick Allen | Bishop of Mobile; 1927–1969 | Succeeded by John Lawrence May |
