= John Quinlan =

John Quinlan may refer to:

- John Quinlan (bishop), Irish Catholic bishop
- John Quinlan (wrestler), American actor and professional wrestler
- John M. Quinlan, member of the Massachusetts Senate
- Jack Quinlan, American sportscaster
- John Ross Quinlan, computer science researcher
