= Qarun =

Qarun may refer to:

- Qárún, in Islam
- Qarun, Iran, a village in Kerman province, Iran
- Qarun District, an administrative district of Dezpart County, Khuzestan province, Iran
- Birket Qarun, a saltwater lake in Egypt, formerly known as Lake Moeris
