= Turuzi =

Africa Proconsularis (125 AD)

Turuzi was an ancient city situated in the Roman province of Africa Proconsularis. Its exact location is now lost to history, but it was somewhere in northern Tunisia.

The town was the seat of an ancient Christian bishopric. At the Council of Carthage, Habetdeum a Donatist leader spoke of the Bishopric at Turuzi saying "we do have a bishop there, one Cattus", to which the Catholic Bishop Serotinus retorted "sure he is there, and he is totally useless." The bishopric survives today as a titular see of the Roman Catholic Church, held by Bishop Mark Steven Rivituso, an Auxiliary Bishop of the Roman Catholic Archdiocese of Saint Louis; he was ordained on May 2, 2017.
