= Cathedral Square, Mobile, Alabama =

Park in Mobile, Alabama, United States

Cathedral Square
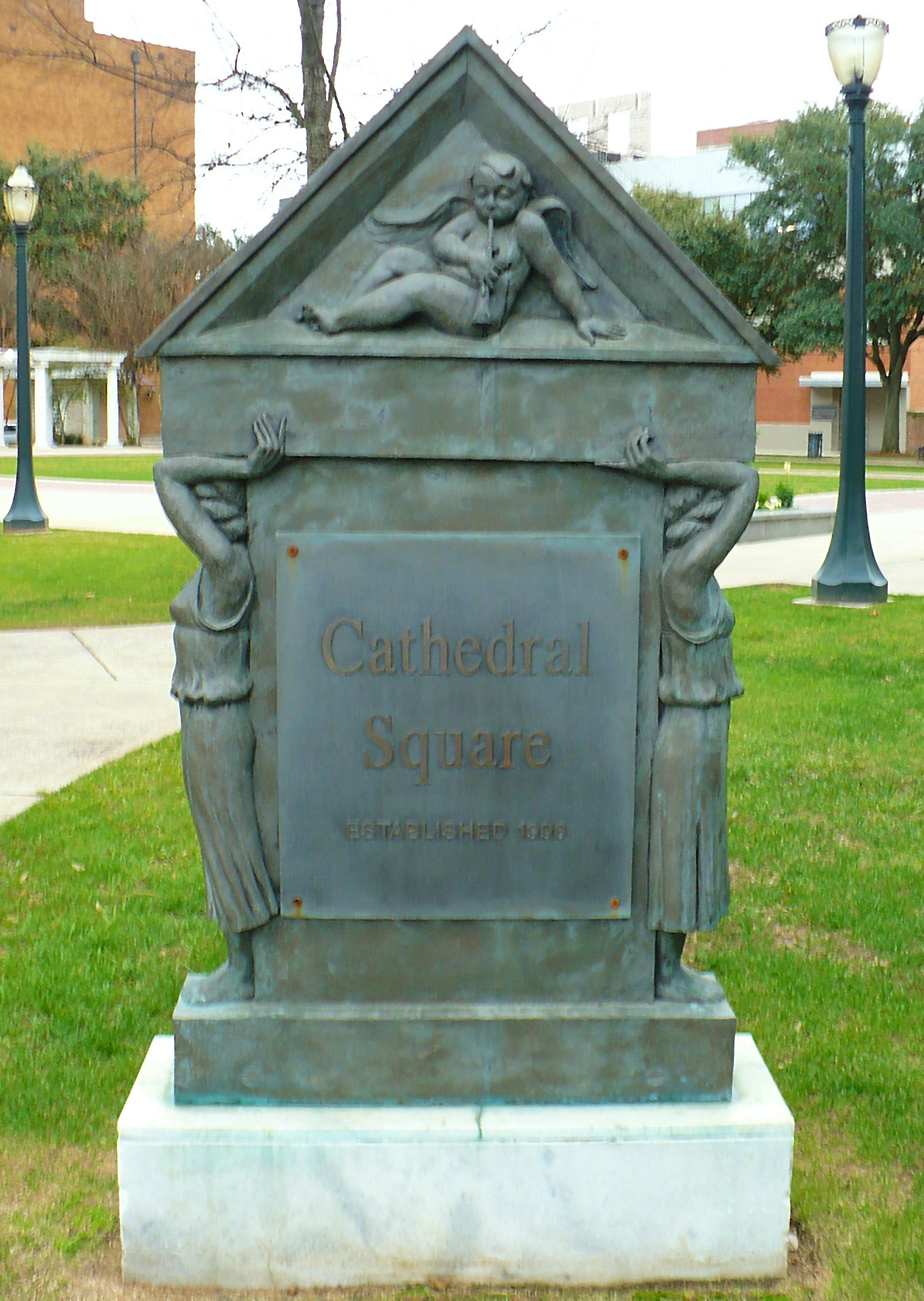
- The northwestern entrance to Cathedral Square
- Interactive map of Cathedral Square
- Type: Public park
- Location: Mobile, Alabama
- Coordinates: 30.690384°N 88.045091°W
- Area: 1 city block
- Created: 1996
- Operator: City of Mobile
- Open: All year

Cathedral Square is a municipal park in Mobile, Alabama. It is bordered by the streets of North Claiborne, Dauphin, North Jackson, and Conti.

== History ==
At one time what is now Cathedral Square was part of Mobile's 18th century Catholic cemetery, the Campo Santo. The Campo Santo was roughly 400 feet (120 m) long by 300 feet (91 m) wide and filled portions of what are now several city blocks between Joachim, Dauphin, Franklin, and Conti Streets. Most of the burials were moved to the new Church Street Graveyard in 1819 as Mobile's city boundary expanded. A few graves continued to be accidentally unearthed along Conti Street as late as the 1890s, however.

The area that is now Cathedral Square quickly became a commercial block filled with buildings after the relocation of the cemetery. The buildings were demolished in 1979 to create a public park facing the cathedral. The current park layout was implemented in 1996.

== Features ==
The park features a layout that mirrors the neighboring Cathedral of the Immaculate Conception. The brick sidewalks mirror the walls and nave of the cathedral while a semicircular colonnade featuring fountains mirrors the apse.
