= Mark Steven Rivituso =

American bishop of the Catholic Church

His Excellency, Most Reverend Mark Steven Rivituso JCL
- Metropolitan Archbishop of Mobile
- Archdiocese: Mobile
- Appointed: July 1, 2025
- Installed: September 3, 2025
- Predecessor: Thomas John Rodi
- Previous post: Auxiliary Bishop of St. Louis and Titular bishop of Turuzi (2017-2025)

Orders
- Ordination: January 16, 1988 by John L. May
- Consecration: May 2, 2017 by Robert James Carlson, Robert Joseph Hermann, and Edward Matthew Rice

Personal details
- Born: September 20, 1961 (age 64) St. Louis, Missouri, US
- Education: Cardinal Glennon College Seminary and Kenrick Seminary; St. Paul University
- Motto: Caritas Christi urget nos (The love of Christ impels us)

Styles of Mark Steven Rivituso
- Reference style: His Excellency; The Most Reverend
- Spoken style: Your Excellency
- Religious style: Archbishop

Mark Steven Rivituso (born September 20, 1961) is an American Catholic prelate who has served as Archbishop of Mobile since 2025. He previously served as auxiliary bishop for the Archdiocese of St. Louis from 2017 to 2025.

== Biography ==
=== Early life ===
Mark Rivituso was born September 20, 1961, in St. Louis, Missouri, to August (Gus) and Rosemary Rivituso. Gus Rivituso worked three jobs to support his eight children. Mark Rivituso's grandmother, Rose Darpel, was a major influence in his spiritual life. He attended St. Wenceslaus School and then St. Mary's High School, both in St. Louis.

While in high school, Rivituso knew that he wanted to become a priest. After graduation, he entered Cardinal Glennon College Seminary and Kenrick Seminary in Shrewsbury, Missouri. He continued his studies for the priesthood at St. Paul University in Ottawa, Ontario. Rivituso was awarded a master's degree in canon law from St. Paul.

=== Priesthood ===
Rivituso was ordained a priest for the Archdiocese of Saint Louis by Archbishop John L. May at the Cathedral Basilica of St. Louis on January 16, 1988. The archdiocese assigned Rivituso to pastoral assignments at several Missouri parishes:

- Parochial vicar of Saint Ambrose in St. Louis (1988 to 1990)
- Parochial vicar at Immaculate Conception in Dardenne Prairie (1990 to 1993). During this period, he also joined the faculty at Saint Dominic High School in O'Fallon, Missouri.
- Parish administrator of Saint Margaret of Scotland in St. Louis (1993 to 1994)

Rivituso returned to Ottawa in 1994 to further his studies, receiving a Licentiate of Canon Law from St. Paul in 1996. After returning to St. Louis in 1996, he rejoined the Metropolitan Court and was appointed parochial vicar of Saint Jerome Parish in St. Louis.

After eight years at Saint Jerome, the archdiocese transferred Rivituso in 2004 to serve as priest-in-residence at Saint Gabriel the Archangel Parish in St. Louis. The Vatican elevated him to the rank of prelate of honor in 2005 and Archbishop Raymond Burke named him as judicial vicar. Rivituso became pastor of Curé of Ars in Shrewsbury and vicar general in 2011. In 2013, he was named as priest-in-residence at Annunciation Parish in Webster Groves, Missouri.

In 2020, he moved to residence at St. Michael the Archangel Parish in Shrewsbury. In 2023, he moved to residence at St. Raphael the Archangel Parish in St. Louis.

=== Auxiliary Bishop of St. Louis ===
Coat of arms as auxiliary bishop

Pope Francis appointed Rivituso as titular bishop of Turuzi and auxiliary bishop of St. Louis on March 7, 2017. He was consecrated by Archbishop Robert Carlson at the Cathedral Basilica of St. Louis on May 2, 2017.

=== Metropolitan Archbishop of Mobile ===
On July 1, 2025, Rivituso was appointed Metropolitan Archbishop of Mobile by Pope Leo XIV. He was installed on September 3, 2025.

Catholic Church titles
Preceded by Thomas John Rodi	Archbishop of Mobile; 2025-Present	Succeeded by Incumbent
Preceded by -	Auxiliary Bishop of St. Louis; 2017-2025	Succeeded by -
