= Gerdeh Gerow =

Gerdeh Gerow گرده گرو
- Village
- Location within Iran
- Coordinates: 36°56′42″N 45°49′47″E
- Country: Iran
- Province: West Azerbaijan
- County: Mahabad
- Bakhsh: Central
- Rural District: Mokriyan-e Sharqi

Population (2006)
  - Total: 505
- Time zone: UTC+3:30 (IRST)
  - Summer (DST): UTC+4:30 (IRDT)

Gerdeh Gerow (Persian: گرده گرو; also known as Gerdeh Geravī and Gerdeh Gerdeh) is a village in Mokriyan-e Sharqi Rural District, in the Central District of Mahabad County, West Azerbaijan Province, Iran. At the 2006 census, its population was 505, in 93 families.
