= Edward Patrick Allen =

American prelate

The Most Reverend Edward Patrick Allen
- Bishop of Mobile
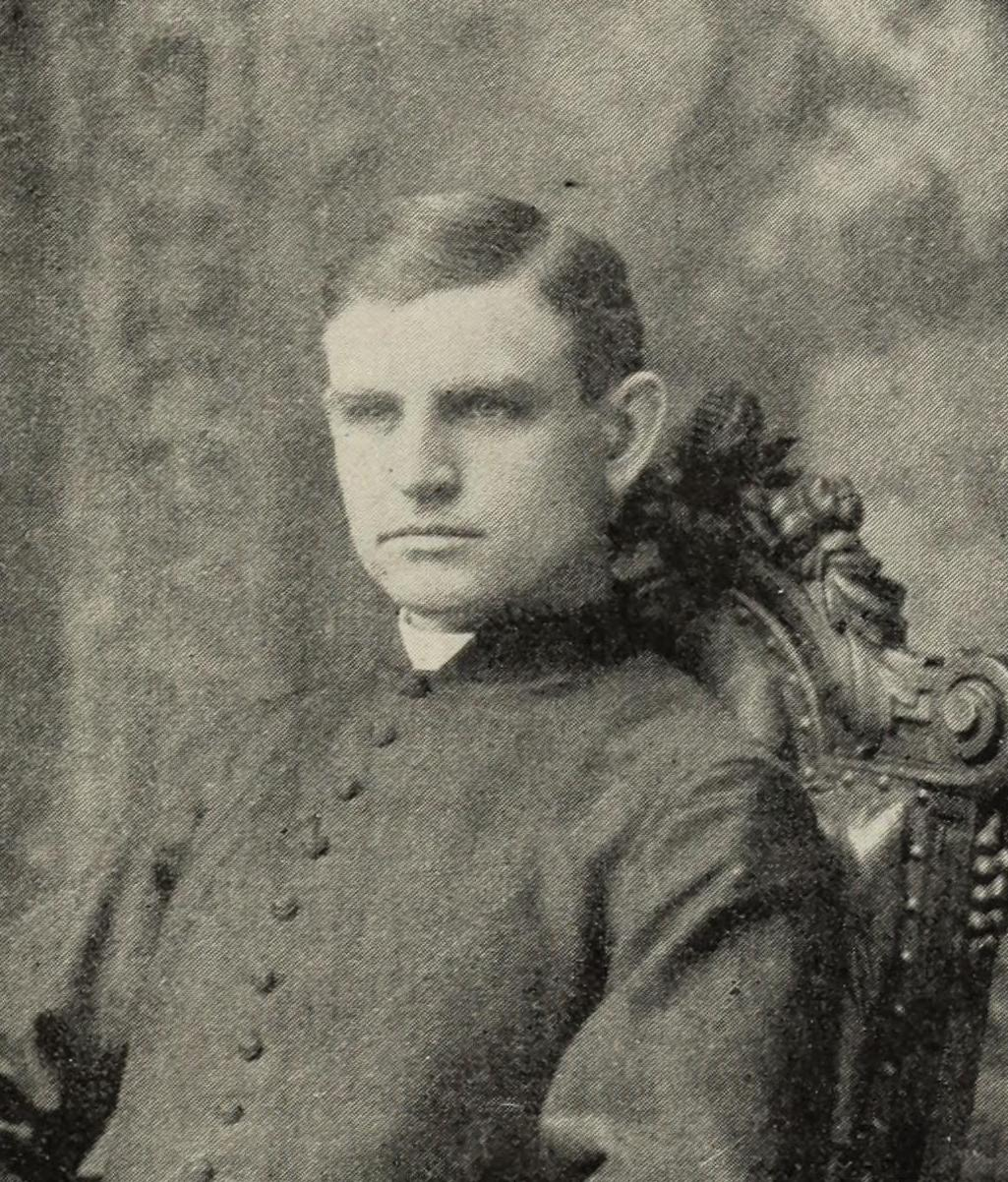
- Church: Roman Catholic Church
- See: Mobile
- In office: April 19, 1897 – October 21, 1926
- Predecessor: Jeremiah O'Sullivan
- Successor: Thomas Joseph Toolen

Orders
- Ordination: December 17, 1881
- Consecration: May 16, 1897

Personal details
- Born: March 17, 1853 Lowell, Massachusetts
- Died: October 21, 1926 (aged 73) Mobile, Alabama

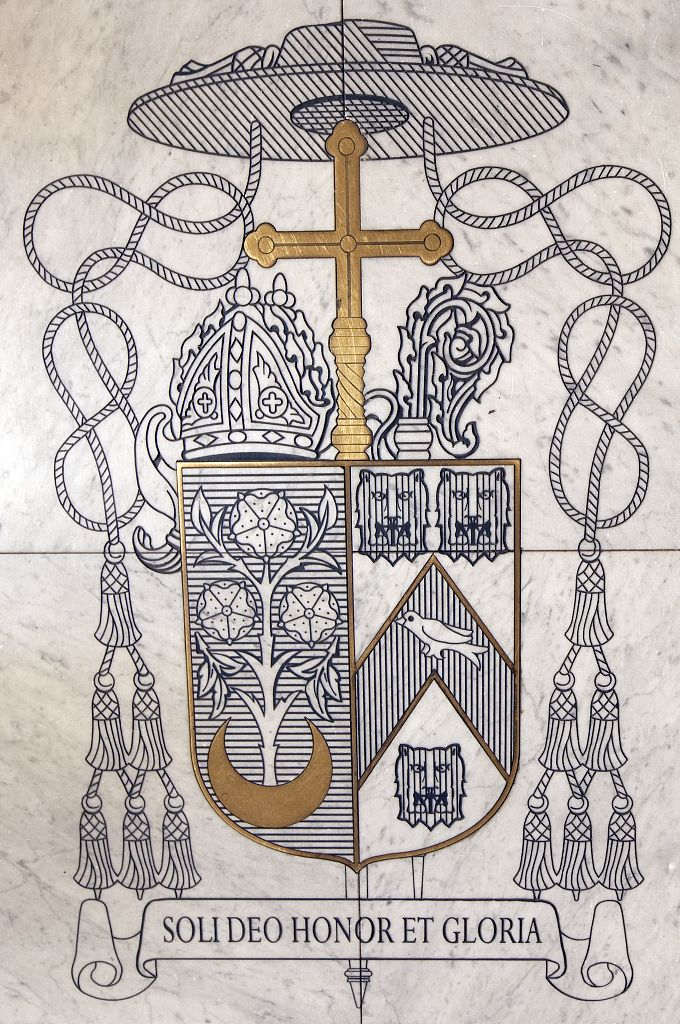
Coat of arms of Bishop Allen

Edward Patrick Allen (March 17, 1853 – October 21, 1926) was an American prelate of the Roman Catholic Church who served as Bishop of Mobile from 1897 until his death in 1926.

== Biography ==
Edward Allen was born in Lowell, Massachusetts, to John and Mary (née Egan) Allen. His parents were both natives of King's County, Ireland. He received his early education in the public schools of his native city, and attended Lowell Commercial College before entering Mount St. Mary's Seminary in Emmitsburg, Maryland. He earned a Master of Arts degree with honors in 1878, and remained at Mount St. Mary's for his theological studies. On December 17, 1881, he was ordained to the priesthood by Bishop Thomas A. Becker.

Allen then taught English and Greek at Mount St. Mary's until 1882, when he became a curate at the Cathedral of the Holy Cross in Boston. He was afterwards sent to Framingham, also serving as chaplain of the state reformatory in Sherborn. In 1884, he returned to Mount St. Mary's as its vice-president and treasurer. He was elected president of the same institution in June 1885. In 1889, he received a Doctor of Divinity degree from Georgetown University.

On April 19, 1897, Allen was appointed the fifth Bishop of Mobile, Alabama, by Pope Leo XIII. He received his episcopal consecration on the following May 16 from Cardinal James Gibbons, with Bishops Edward Fitzgerald and Matthew Harkins serving as co-consecrators, in the Cathedral of the Assumption in Baltimore.

During Allen's administration, the Catholic population of the diocese increased from 18,000 to 48,000, and the number of priests more than doubled. He also established several new churches, hospitals, orphanages, and schools. The diocese was devastated by a major hurricane in September 1906; many churches were either totally or partially destroyed, but were rebuilt or repaired under Allen's direction. Deeply concerned for the African American community, he invited the Josephite Fathers to direct the black missions in the diocese, founded St. Joseph's College in order to "educate young colored men to be catechists and teachers," and sanctioned the establishment of the Knights of Peter Claver.

Allen died at age 73, and was buried in the crypt of the Cathedral Basilica of the Immaculate Conception.

Catholic Church titles
Preceded by Jeremiah O'Sullivan	Bishop of Mobile; 1897–1926	Succeeded by Thomas Joseph Toolen
