= Cathedral Basilica of the Immaculate Conception (Mobile, Alabama) =

Catholic cathedral in Alabama, US

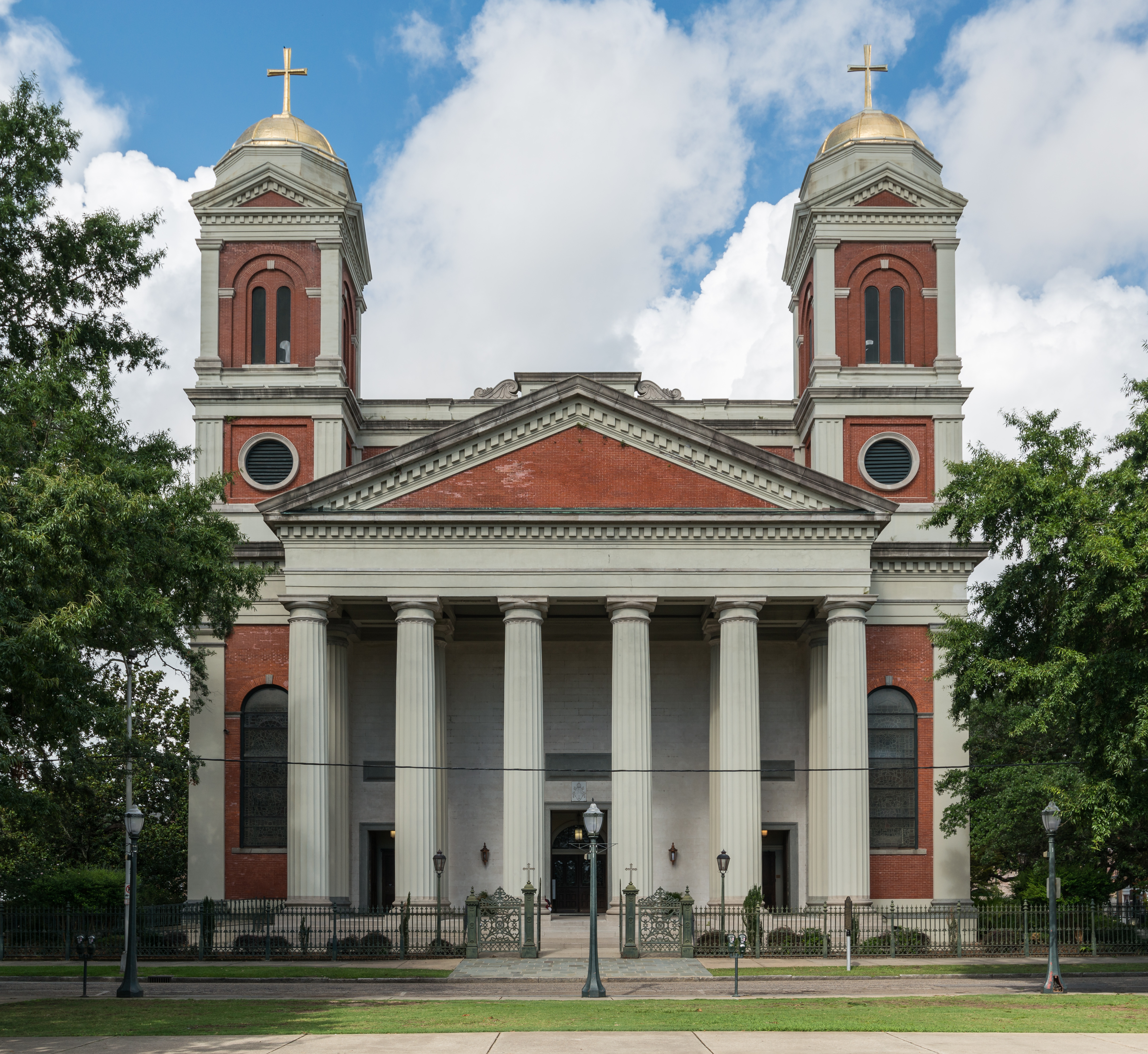
- Cathedral Basilica of the Immaculate Conception
- 30°41′24″N 88°02′45″W
- Location: 2 South Claiborne Street; Mobile, Alabama
- Country: United States
- Denomination: Catholic Church
- Sui iuris church: Latin Church
- Website: www.mobilecathedral.org

History
- Founded: 1703
- Founder: Most Rev. Michael Portier

Architecture
- Architect: Claude Beroujon
- Style: Greek Revival
- Groundbreaking: 1835
- Completed: 1850

Specifications
- Materials: Brick

Administration
- Archdiocese: Mobile

Clergy
- Archbishop: Most Rev. Mark Steven Rivituso
- Rector: Msgr. William J. Skoneki
- Cathedral Basilica of the Immaculate Conception
- U.S. Historic district – Contributing property
- Part of: Church Street East Historic District, Lower Dauphin Street Historic District (ID71000102, 79000392)
- Added to NRHP: December 16, 1971, February 19, 1979

The Cathedral Basilica of the Immaculate Conception (French: Cathédrale de l'Immaculée-Conception de Mobile) is a Catholic cathedral in Mobile, Alabama, United States. The cathedral is the seat of the archbishop of the Archdiocese of Mobile. It is named for Mary, mother of Jesus, under her title, Our Lady of the Immaculate Conception.

== History ==
=== Early churches ===
Mobile's Cathedral Parish was established on July 20, 1703, by Jean-Baptiste de la Croix de Chevrières de Saint-Vallier, Bishop of Quebec. Bishop de Saint-Vallier named Father Roulleaux de La Vente, first pastor of the parish church, which was located at the French settlement of Mobile at the citadel of Fort Louis de la Louisiane. The parish is the first established on the Gulf Coast.

When the Mobile settlement was relocated to its present site in 1711, a new parish church was built and was known as Notre Dame de la Mobile (Our Lady of Mobile). In 1781, during the Spanish occupation of Mobile, the parish took its current name, Immaculate Conception.

Pope Pius VIII erected the Diocese of Mobile in 1829 and appointed Bishop Michael Portier as its first bishop. Portier's first “cathedral” was a small wooden structure located in the Old Spanish Burying Ground, site of the present cathedral. Portier soon set out to construct a "real" cathedral.

=== Construction and improvements ===
In 1833, Portier hired Claude Beroujon, a former seminarian turned architect to create a Roman basilica design for the new Immaculate Conception Cathedral. Portier laid the cornerstone of the cathedral in 1835. However, the financial crisis in the United States known as the Panic of 1837 forced a long delay in the cathedral construction. Portier finally consecrated Immaculate Conceptions in 1850. However, due to lack of funds, he was unable to construct the portico and towers.

On May 25, 1865, at the end of the American Civil War, 30 tons of gunpowder ignited inside an ammunition depot operated by the Union Army in Mobile. The blast killed 300 people and destroyed much of the town. The explosion also shattered the windows and sashes on the north side of the empty cathedral.

Bishop John Quinlan was finally able in the 1870s to add a classical portico, with eight massive doric columns, to the outside of the cathedral. The two towers were completed in 1884 by Bishop Jeremiah O'Sullivan.

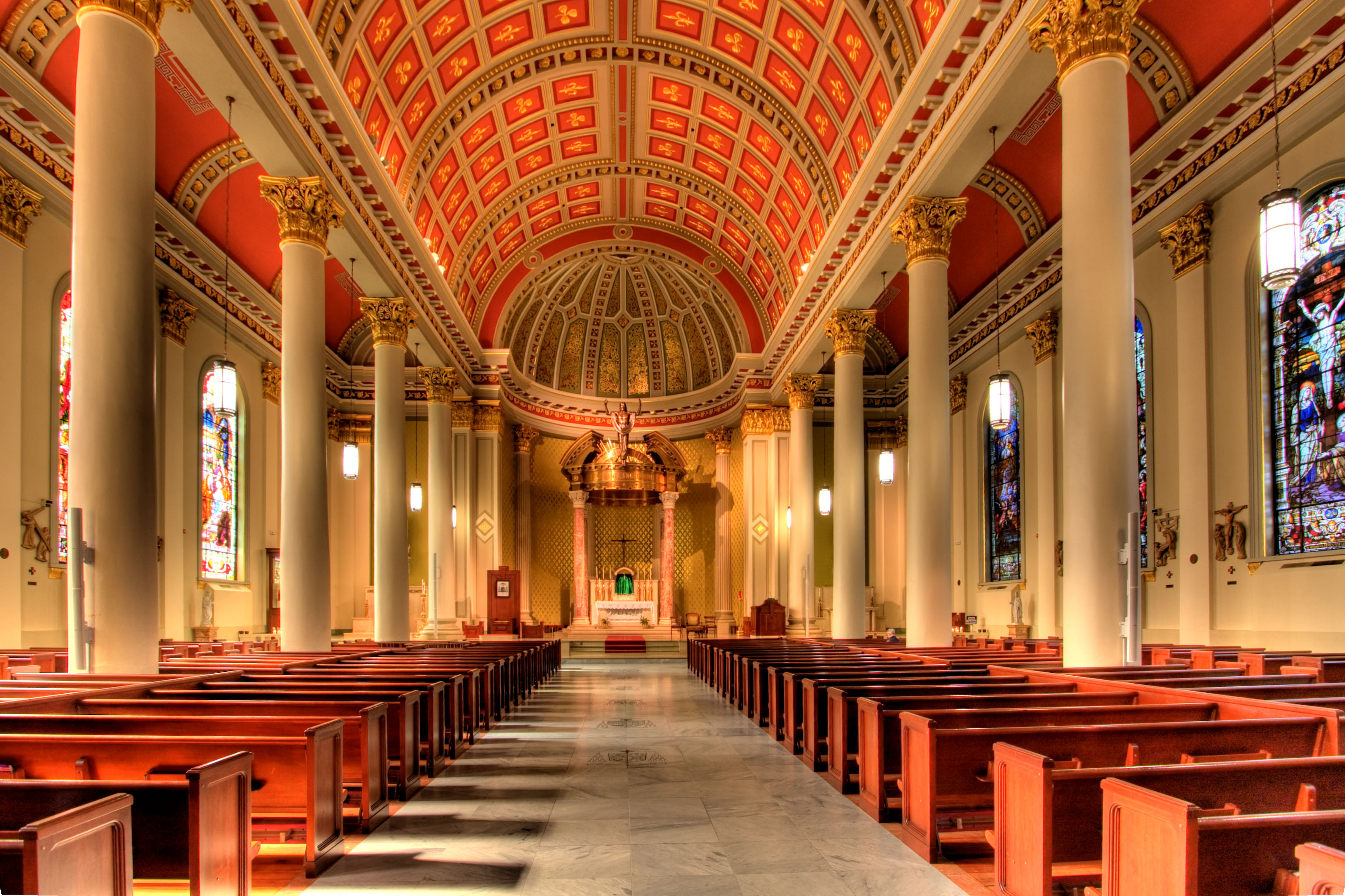
View from the nave to the sanctuary in 2009

In 1946, a US Navy plane hit the South Tower of the cathedral before it crashed nearby, killing the pilot.

=== Fire damage and restoration ===
On March 19, 1954, a homeless man sheltering in the church basement caused a fire that raced up through the sanctuary. Two firefighters, both former altar boys, ran into the burning building to retrieve religious objects. The cathedral survived the fire, but the interior suffered heavy fire, smoke, and water damage. Eight of the large stained glass windows were destroyed, along with the cathedra, pulpit and pipe organ. The damage estimate was $250,000, which was not entirely covered by insurance.

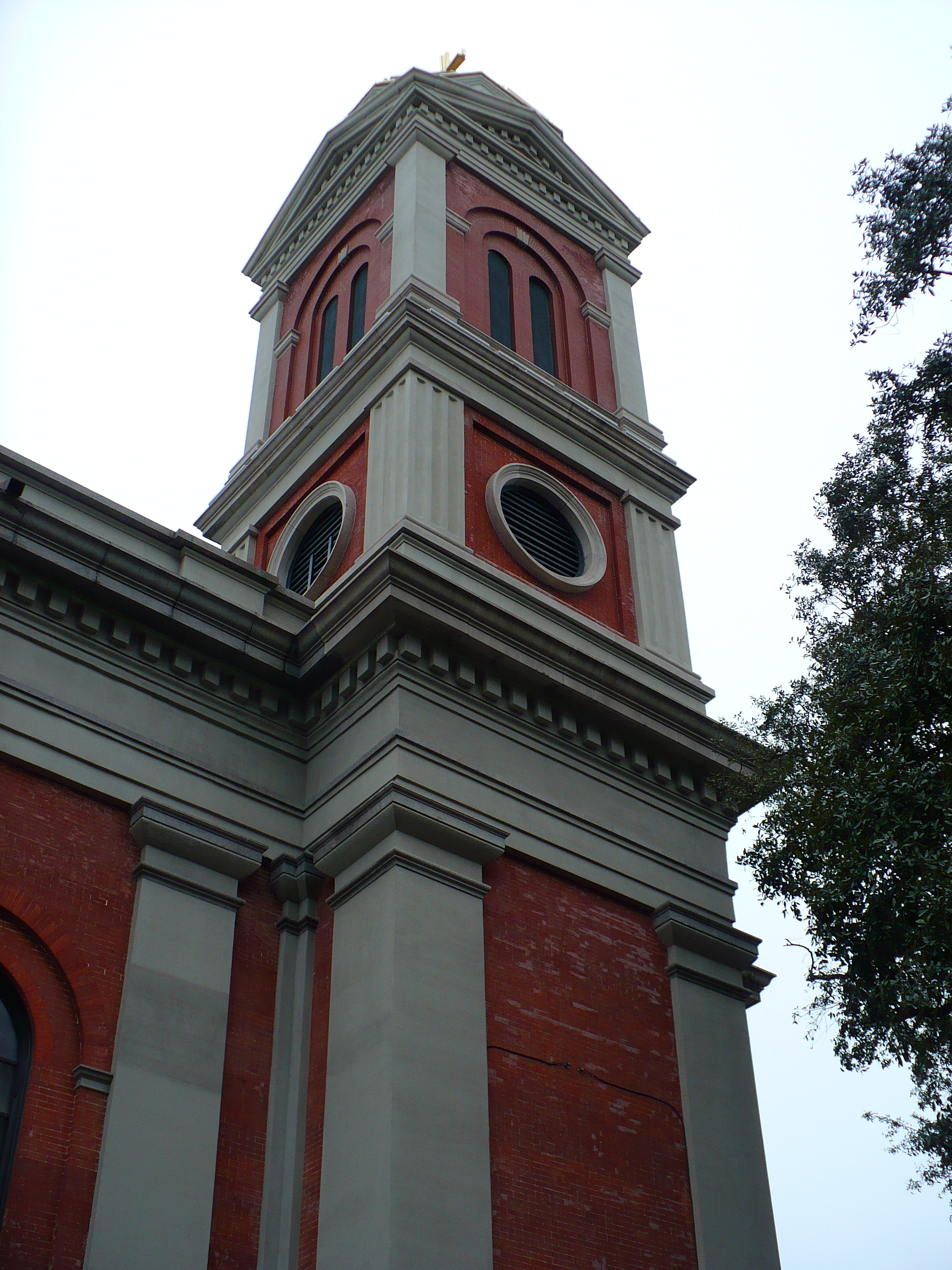
South Tower, Immaculate Conception Cathedral (2009)

After the 1954 fire, Bishop Thomas Toolen sent the damaged stained glass windows to the Franz Meyer workshops in Munich for repair. He replaced the cathedra and pulpit with new mahogany ones. A replacement organ, built by the Wicks Organ Company of Highland, Illinois, was installed. Toolen also added a massive bronze baldachin above the altar, supported by four marble columns.

=== Recent modifications ===
In 1962, Pope John XXIII elevated the cathedral to a minor basilica. The pope's personal coat-of-arms is installed above the cathedral entrance. The yellow and red umbracullum (umbrella) and tintinnabulum (bell) which signify the rank of basilica are housed in the sanctuary.

In the 1970s, Bishop John L. May modified the sanctuary in compliance with the 1970 General Instruction of the Roman Missal issued by the Vatican. This document spelled out changes in church layouts from the Second Vatican Council in the 1960's. May moved the altar forward and removed the altar rails. The cathedra was moved to the south end of the sanctuary, facing the congregation. May also added a bronze representation of the Risen Christ above the baldachin and a large crucifix over the tabernacle.

Hurricane Frederic damaged the cathedral steeples in 1979, forcing the parish to replace its wooden crosses with replicas in aluminum.

Archbishop Oscar Hugh Lipscomb led the most recent restoration effort in the 2000s. Under his direction, the cast-iron fence was restored and repaired, and the cathedral exterior was cleaned and repaired. An interior overhaul, executed by Conrad Schmitt Studios, included a coffer ceiling above the main aisle. The coffers are decorated with alternating gold-leafed fleur-de-lis and shamrock, symbolically representing the Trinity, as well as the contributions of the French and Irish religious to the life of the Archdiocese. New lighting and a new color scheme brightens the interior. White marble flooring was installed in the aisles and the heart pine floors under the pews were refinished. Embedded in the marble floor of the main aisle are the coats-of-arms of the Mobile bishops and archbishops. A mural of the Tree of Jesse was installed above the pipe organ.

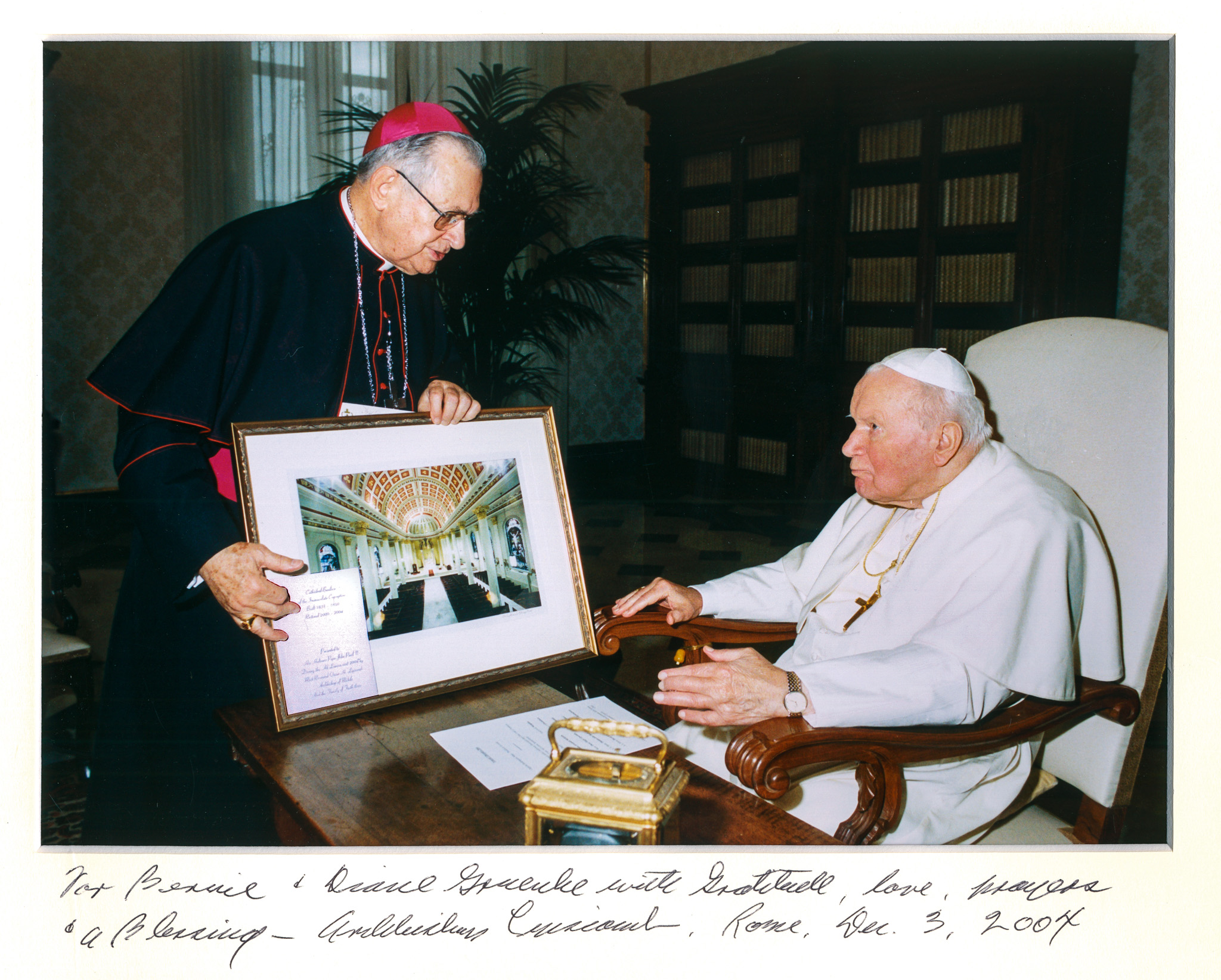
Archbishop Lipscomb presents Pope John Paul II with a photograph of Immaculate Conception (2004)

In 2004, Lipscomb presented Pope John Paul II with a photograph of the cathedral.

== Location and dimensions ==
Immaculate Conception Cathedral is located on South Claiborne Street in Mobile. It is bounded by Dauphin Street on the north, Franklin Street on the west, and Conti Street on the south. The front of the church faces east, toward the Mobile River, and overlooks Cathedral Square.

The cathedral is listed on the National Register of Historic Places as a contributing property to the Church Street East Historic District and the Lower Dauphin Street Historic District. It is part of the Historic Roman Catholic Properties in Mobile Multiple Property Submission

The building, laid out in an east–west axis, is 164 ft (50 m) long and 90 ft (27 m) wide. The ceiling is 60 ft (18 m) at its highest point, and its twin towers rise to 103 ft (31 m).

== Stained glass windows ==
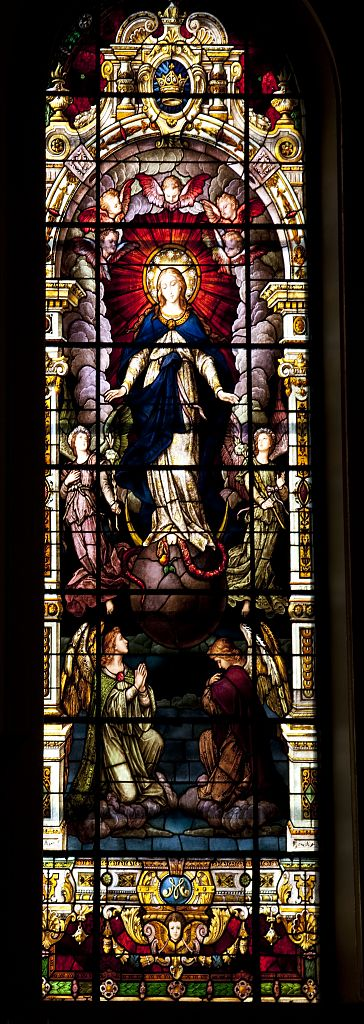
Our Lady of the Immaculate Conception (2010)

The stained glass windows in Immaculate Conception Cathedral were made in Munich, Germany by Franz Mayer & Co., and installed beginning in 1890. The last window was installed in 1910. Some of them were remade by Franz Mayer after the 1954 fire.

=== Main windows ===
The twelve main windows are approximately 8 feet (2.4 m) wide and 23 feet (7.0 m) tall. Each window depicts an event involving Mary in the life of her son, Jesus. The six south wall windows show the following:

- Our Lady of the Immaculate Conception
- Presentation of Mary at the Temple
- Annunciation
- Visitation
- Nativity of Jesus
- Holy Family

The six north wall windows show the following:

- Finding of the Child Jesus at the Temple
- Marriage Feast of Cana
- Crucifixion of Jesus
- Pentecost
- Assumption of Mary into Heaven
- Coronation of Mary, Queen of Heaven

=== Portico windows ===
Two large stained glass windows flank the portico, one under each of the two towers.

- The Baptism of Jesus in the River Jordan by John the Baptist is depicted in the window in the Reconciliation Room, under the north tower.
- The window under the south tower, in the stairway to the choir loft, depicts St. Cecilia, the patron saint of musicians.

=== Foyer door windows ===
The cathedral has eight doors in the foyer, behind the main doors at the front entrance of the cathedral. These doors have small stained glass windows with the following depiction:

- Augustine of Hippo
- Our Lady of Mount Carmel
- Presentation of Mary at the Temple
- Louis IX, King of France
- St. Patrick
- Our Lady of the Immaculate Conception
- St. Agnes of Rome
- Virgin & Martyr
- Most Sacred Heart of Jesus

Above the four middle doors is the Holy Spirit window.

== Gallery ==
This gallery contains photographs of Immaculate Conception Cathedral that were taken in 1936 for the Historic American Buildings Survey.

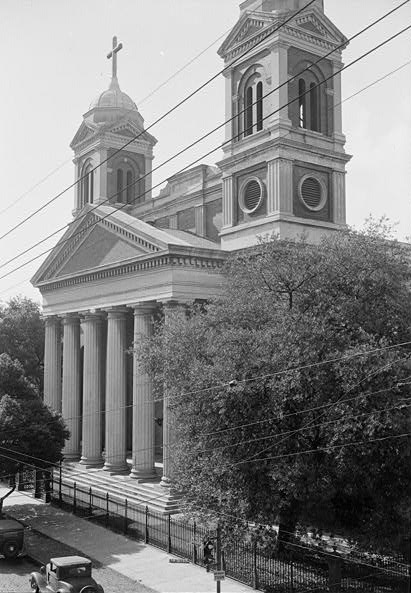
East elevation (front), portico and towers

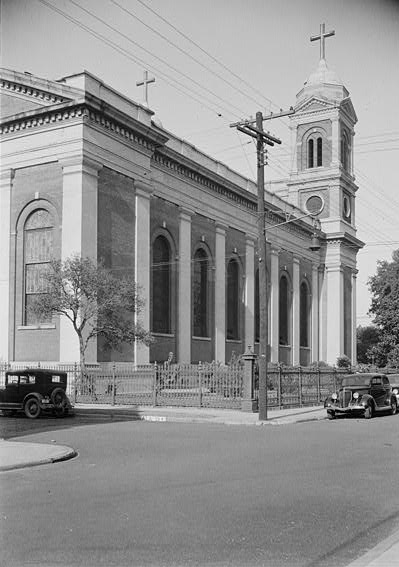
South side and tower, looking slightly northeast

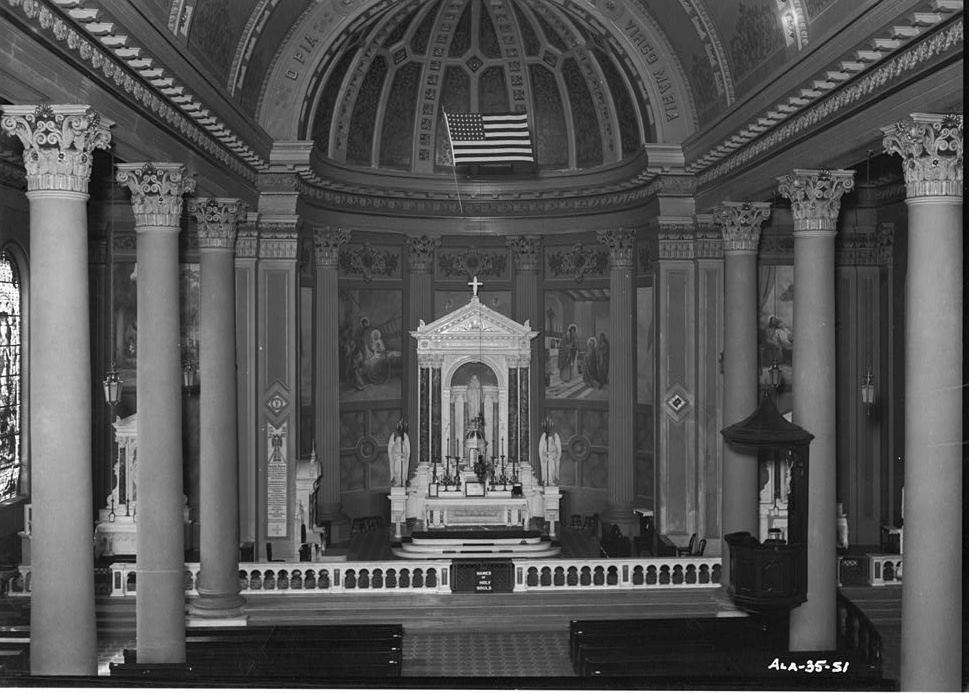
West end of the nave from the organ balcony, showing the sanctuary and apse

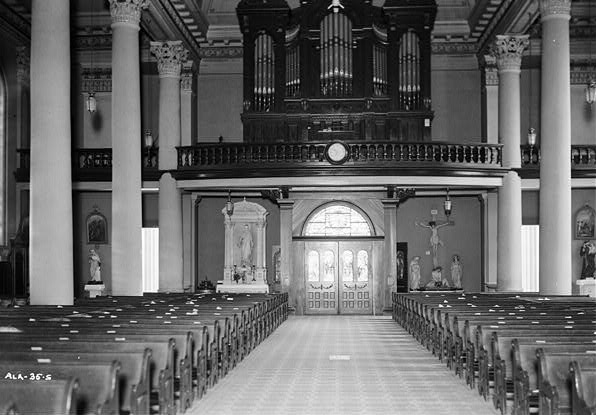
East end of the nave, showing the organ, choir balcony and entrance

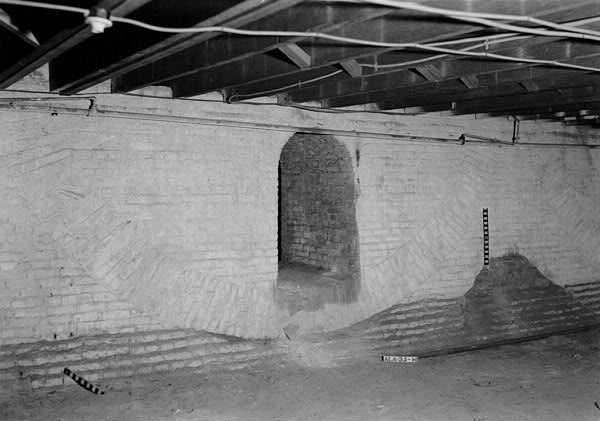
Section of foundation wall under the line of columns above the nave

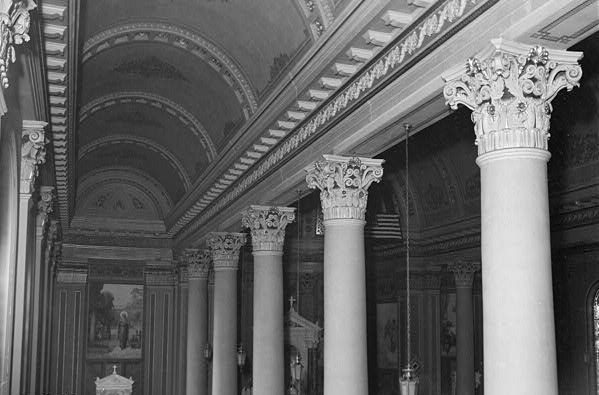
Interior column caps and barrel vault ceiling over the south aisle

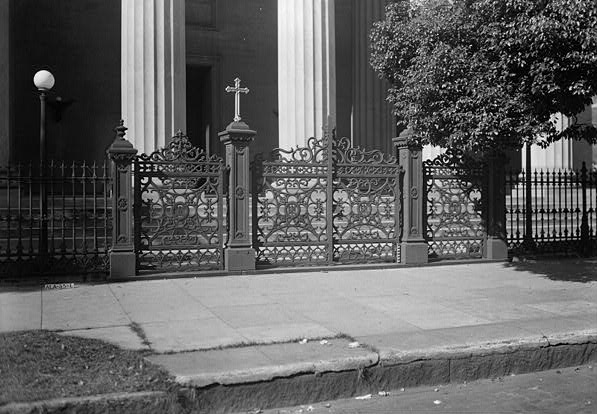
Cast-iron gates and fence on the east front

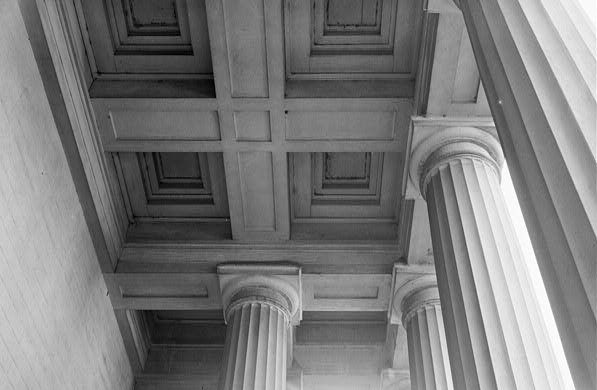
Detail of portico ceiling and columns, north end of portico

== See also ==
- List of Catholic cathedrals in the United States
- List of cathedrals in the United States
