= Dam Gerow Band =

Dam Gerow Band دم گروبند
- Village
- Location within Iran
- Coordinates: 27°38′29″N 56°34′23″E
- Country: Iran
- Province: Hormozgan
- County: Bandar Abbas
- Bakhsh: Central
- Rural District: Isin

Population (2006)
  - Total: 30
- Time zone: UTC+3:30 (IRST)
  - Summer (DST): UTC+4:30 (IRDT)

Dam Gerow Band (Persian: دم گروبند; also known as Pāzhnān) is a village in Isin Rural District, in the Central District of Bandar Abbas County, Hormozgan Province, Iran. At the 2006 census, its population was 30, in 8 families.
