= Jeremiah O'Sullivan =

Irish-born clergyman (1842–1896)

His Excellency, The Right Reverend Jeremiah O'Sullivan
- Bishop of Mobile
- Church: Roman Catholic Church
- See: Mobile
- In office: June 16, 1885 – August 10, 1896
- Predecessor: Dominic Manucy
- Successor: Edward Patrick Allen

Orders
- Ordination: June 30, 1868 by Martin John Spalding
- Consecration: September 20, 1885 by John Joseph Keane

Personal details
- Born: February 6, 1842 Kanturk, County Cork, Ireland
- Died: August 10, 1896 (aged 54) Mobile, Alabama, US

Jeremiah O'Sullivan (February 6, 1842 – August 10, 1896) was an Irish-born clergyman of the Roman Catholic Church who served as bishop of Mobile in Alabama from 1885 until his death in 1896.

== Biography ==
=== Early life ===
Jeremiah O'Sullivan was born on February 6, 1842, in Kanturk, County Cork, to John and Mary (née Ahern) O'Sullivan. He came to the United States in 1863, and entered St. Charles College in Ellicott City, Maryland. After completing his classical course, he made his theological studies at St. Mary's Seminary in Baltimore.

=== Priesthood ===
O'Sullivan was ordained to the priesthood by Archbishop Martin John Spalding on June 30, 1868.

His first assignment was as a curate under Reverend Placide Louis Chapelle at St. Peter's Church in Rockville, Maryland. He then served as a pastor in Westernport, Maryland, for nine years. During his time in Westernport, he erected a church and a convent for the Sisters of St. Joseph, under whose direction he placed the parochial school. He was afterwards sent to Washington, D.C., where he served as pastor of St. Peter's Church.

=== Bishop of Mobile ===
On June 16, 1885, O'Sullivan was appointed the fourth bishop of Mobile by Pope Leo XIII. He received his episcopal consecration on September 20, 1885, from Archbishop James Gibbons, with Bishops John Joseph Keane and Henry P. Northrop serving as co-consecrators, at St. Peter's Church. His installation took place in Mobile on November 1, 1885. A gifted administrator, he was successful in restoring the financial status of the diocese. He also established several new churches, chapels, and schools, and oversaw the addition of two towers to the Cathedral of the Immaculate Conception.

=== Death ===
O'Sullivan died in Mobile on August 10, 1896, at age 54; he is buried in the crypt of Immaculate Conception Cathedral.

== Episcopal succession ==
Catholic Church titles
Preceded by Dominic Manucy	Bishop of Mobile; 1885–1896	Succeeded by Edward Patrick Allen
