= Oscar Hugh Lipscomb =

American Roman Catholic bishop (1931–2020)

The Most Reverend Oscar Hugh Lipscomb
- Archbishop of Mobile
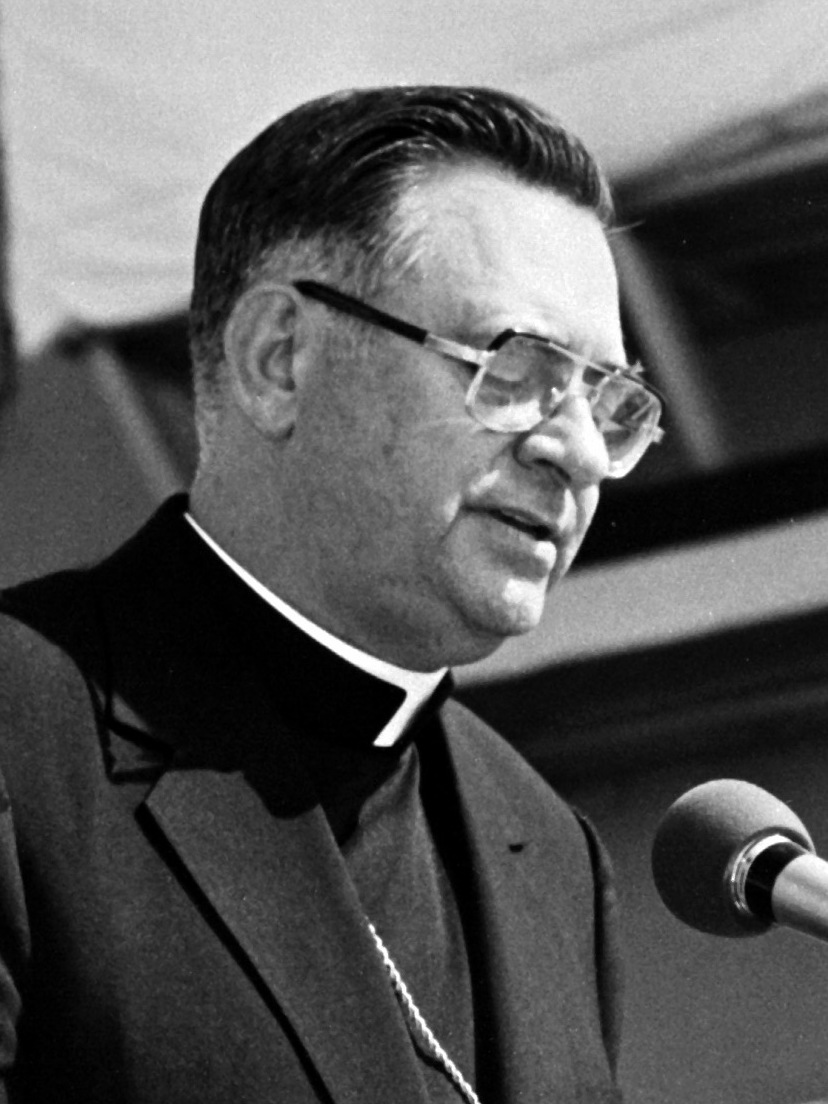
- Archdiocese: Mobile
- Appointed: July 29, 1980
- Installed: November 16, 1980
- Term ended: April 2, 2008
- Predecessor: John L. May
- Successor: Thomas John Rodi
- Previous post: Chancellor of Roman Catholic Archdiocese of Mobile

Orders
- Ordination: July 15, 1956
- Consecration: November 16, 1980 by John L. May, William Benedict Friend, Raymond W. Lessard

Personal details
- Born: September 21, 1931 Mobile, Alabama, U.S.
- Died: July 15, 2020 (aged 88) Mobile, Alabama, U.S.

Styles of Oscar Hugh Lipscomb
- Reference style: His Excellency; The Most Reverend
- Spoken style: Your Excellency
- Religious style: Archbishop

Oscar Hugh Lipscomb (September 21, 1931 – July 15, 2020) was an American bishop of the Catholic Church. He served the Roman Catholic Archdiocese of Mobile, Alabama, for 28 years. Lipscomb attended high school in Mobile before studying for the priesthood in Rome. He was ordained a priest in 1956 and served in the Archdiocese of Mobile as a parish priest and teacher. He became chancellor of the archdiocese in 1966 and was consecrated as a bishop fourteen years later. He retired in 2008. He was the first Archbishop of Mobile and its eighth bishop.

== Early life ==
Lipscomb was born on September 21, 1931, to Oscar H. Lipscomb Sr. and Margaret Antoinette (née Saunders) Lipscomb. He graduated from McGill–Toolen Catholic High School in 1949, then known as McGill Institute, where there is an athletic complex named in his honor. After graduating from McGill in 1949, he entered St. Bernard Junior Seminary and College in Cullman, Alabama. He attended seminary at the Pontifical North American College in Rome. On July 15, 1956, Lipscomb was ordained to the Catholic priesthood in Rome. He later acquired an M.A. degree in history in 1960 and a Ph.D. degree in history from the Catholic University of America in 1963.

== Ministry ==
Lipscomb was a parish priest in Mobile and an educator at McGill Institute and Spring Hill College. He was appointed chancellor of the Mobile archdiocese in 1966 and served in that capacity until he was appointed Archbishop of Mobile in 1980. He was appointed Archbishop of Mobile on July 29, 1980, and consecrated on November 16, 1980, by his immediate predecessor, Archbishop John May. The Diocese of Mobile was elevated to the Archdiocese of Mobile on the date Lipscomb was appointed its first archbishop.

Lipscomb came into the national spotlight in the United States in the early 1990s due to a controversy involving the Reverend David Trosch, a priest of the archdiocese in Magnolia Springs, a community in south Baldwin County southeast of Mobile. Trosch sparked the controversy with his anti-abortion statements advocating the theory of justifiable homicide in the case of killing abortion providers, and his attempt to place an advertisement in the Mobile Press-Register newspaper with his original cartoon showing a man pointing a gun at a doctor who was holding a knife over a pregnant woman. Lipscomb offered Trosch "the alternative of publicly abiding by the [archbishop's] judgment on this erroneous teaching or relinquishing his public position in the church". Lipscomb removed Trosch from his pastoral assignments in August 1993 and suspended him from pastoral duties in a disciplinary action which was less strict than a censure, allowing Trosch to continue saying Mass but limiting him to having "no public persona in the Church". Trosch maintained a website under the name of a non-profit organization called "Life Enterprises Unlimited" based in Mobile until the time of his death, in which he criticized many people whom he characterized as "hell-bound sinners" including Archbishop Lipscomb.

For many years, Lipscomb was a member of the Joint International Commission for Theological Dialogue Between the Catholic Church and the Orthodox Church. His resignation was accepted by the Pope in 2008. Nonetheless, he stayed engaged with the life of the Catholic community in the archdiocese.

Lipscomb died on July 15, 2020, at a home run by the Little Sisters of the Poor in midtown Mobile. He was 88, and had suffered "a lengthy period of physical decline" in the years leading up to his death.

== See also ==
- Catholic Church hierarchy
- Catholic Church in the United States
- Historical list of the Catholic bishops of the United States
- List of Catholic bishops of the United States
- Lists of patriarchs, archbishops, and bishops

== Episcopal succession ==
Catholic Church titles
Preceded by John Lawrence May	Archbishop of Mobile; 1980–2008	Succeeded by Thomas John Rodi
