= John L. May =

American Catholic prelate (1922–1994)

His Excellency John L. May
- Archbishop of St. Louis
- See: St. Louis
- Appointed: January 24, 1980
- Installed: March 25, 1980
- Term ended: December 9, 1992
- Predecessor: John Carberry
- Successor: Justin Francis Rigali
- Previous posts: Bishop of Mobile (1969–1980); Auxiliary Bishop of Chicago (1967–1969)

Orders
- Ordination: May 3, 1947 by Samuel Stritch
- Consecration: August 24, 1967 by John Cody

Personal details
- Born: March 31, 1922 Evanston, Illinois
- Died: March 24, 1994 (aged 71) St. Louis, Missouri
- Denomination: Roman Catholic Church

John Lawrence May (March 31, 1922 – March 24, 1994) was an American Catholic prelate who served as Archbishop of St. Louis from 1980 to 1992. He previously served as an auxiliary bishop of the Archdiocese of Chicago from 1967 to 1969, and as Bishop of Mobile from 1969 to 1980.

== Early life and education ==
John May was born on March 31, 1922, in Evanston, Illinois, to Peter Michael and Catherine (née Allare) May. He received his early education at the parochial school of St. Nicholas Church in Evanston, and attended Archbishop Quigley Preparatory Seminary in Chicago, graduating in 1940. His theological studies were made at St. Mary of Lake Seminary in Mundelein, Illinois. where he earned a Licentiate of Sacred Theology. May was of Luxembourgian ancestry.

== Priesthood ==
On May 3, 1947, May was ordained to the priesthood for the Archdiocese of Chicago at St. Mary of the Lake by Cardinal Samuel Stritch After his 1947 ordination, the archdiocese assigned him as a curate at St. Gregory Church in Chicago. In 1956, he was transferred to Mercy Hospital in Chicago as a chaplain.

In 1959, the Catholic Church Extension Society named May as their vice-president and general secretary; he was named as its president in 1967. He also taught at St. Gregory the Great High School in Chicago and Loyola University Chicago, and served on the archdiocesan marriage tribunal.

== Episcopacy ==
=== Auxiliary Bishop of Chicago ===
On June 16, 1967, May was appointed auxiliary bishop of Chicago and titular bishop of Tagarbala by Pope Paul VI. He received his episcopal consecration on August 24, 1967, from Cardinal John Cody, with Bishops Cletus F. O'Donnell and Aloysius Wycislo serving as co-consecrators, at Holy Name Cathedral in Chicago. In addition to his episcopal duties, May served as pastor of Christ the King Parish in Chicago.

=== Bishop of Mobile ===
Following the resignation of Bishop Thomas Toolen, May was appointed as bishop of Mobile on September 29, 1969, by Paul VI. May's installation took place on December 10, 1969, at the Cathedral of the Immaculate Conception in Mobile During his 10-year tenure in Mobile, May established eight parishes and two deaneries, dedicated 12 churches, founded two schools, and erected a convent. He also dedicated several parish centers, homes for the elderly and a new wing and intensive-care unit at Providence Hospital in Mobile.

May continued to implement the liturgical reforms of the Second Vatican Council, authorizing the distribution of the eucharist by the laity, the hand reception of the eucharist by congregants and a new rite for the sacrament of penance. He founded an Office of Youth Ministry, a diocesan pastoral council, and a diocesan board of Catholic education. He also established a retirement program for all lay church employees, a new health insurance program, a marriage preparation program, and anti-abortion programs. In 1977, May imposed a term limit of six years in a parish for priests in the diocese. He ordained the diocese's first class of permanent deacons in 1979.

=== Archbishop of St. Louis ===
On January 24, 1980, May was appointed as the sixth archbishop of St. Louis by Pope John Paul II. He was installed at the Cathedral Basilica of St. Louis on March 25, 1980.

During his 12-year tenure in St. Louis, May encouraged dialogue between Catholics and other Christians. He ordained Reverend J. Terry Steib as the first African-American auxiliary bishop in the archdiocese. May also appointed the archdiocese's first chief financial officer and the first female superintendent of Catholic schools. As in Mobile, he started a self-insurance program in the archdiocese and improved the retirement program for lay employees.

An advocate for the poor and homeless, May greatly expanded the programs of the diocesan branch of Catholic Charities, and initiated a program designed to directly assist pregnant. He served as president of the National Conference of Catholic Bishops from 1986 to 1989. Due to a decline in the number of seminarians, May was forced to consolidate the archdiocesan seminary system. In 1987, he merged Cardinal Glennon College and Kenrick Seminary to form Kenrick-Glennon Seminary. In 1990, with Sister Mary Ann Eckhoff and St. Louis businessman Robert A. Brooks, May co-founded the archdiocese's Today and Tomorrow Educational Foundation.

== Retirement and death ==
In July 1992, May was diagnosed with brain cancer. For this reason, he resigned as archbishop of St. Louis on December 9, 1992. He died in 1994 at a St. Louis nursing home, at age 71. He was buried in the Cathedral Basilica of St. Louis.

Catholic Church titles
Preceded by Thomas Joseph Toolen	Bishop of Mobile; 1969–1980	Succeeded by Oscar Hugh Lipscomb
Preceded by John Carberry	Archbishop of Saint Louis; 1980–1992	Succeeded by Justin Francis Rigali
