= St. Peter Catholic Church (Montgomery, Alabama) =

- Location within Alabama
- 32.3752°N 86.3057°W
- Location: 219 Adams Ave, Montgomery, Alabama
- Country: United States
- Denomination: Roman Catholic Church
- Website: www.stpetermontgomery.net

History
- Status: Parish church
- Founded: 1834
- Dedication: St. Peter

Architecture
- Functional status: Active
- Architectural type: Church
- Style: Exterior: Spanish Colonial · interior: Romanesque Revival

Administration
- Province: Mobile
- Diocese: Mobile

Clergy
- Vicar: Rev A. Jayaraj
- Pastor: Rev. Saleth Mariadoss

St. Peter Catholic Church is the first Roman Catholic Church in Montgomery, Alabama, and the third oldest Catholic church in Alabama. It was opened in 1834, but had no resident pastor until 1850. Many of the church's original parishioners were converts from wealthy, educated, Protestant families.

== Church history ==
=== Construction history ===
==== 1800s ====
In 1833, arrangements were made to build the church on a property, donated by Edward Hanrick, on the corner of Lawrence Street and Adams Avenue. It is the only church in Montgomery that had to collect a building fund. In April 1834, a small frame building, the first church on the site, was consecrated by Bishop Michael Portier of Mobile.

In 1851, it was decided that the church was too small for the growing congregation. A new church was built next to the smaller one and was complete in 1852. By 1854, the building cost $7,000 and was paid for in gold. The second consecration occurred in 1854 by Bishop Timon of Louisiana, assisted by Bishop Michael Portier. In 1882, twenty-five feet were added to the front of the building, along with towers, during Reverend Savage's time there.

In the 1890s, the original altars were replaced by three, custom, wooden altars and two large towers were constructed. New pews made out of single pieces of virgin pine were also installed inside the church.

==== 1900s – 2000s ====
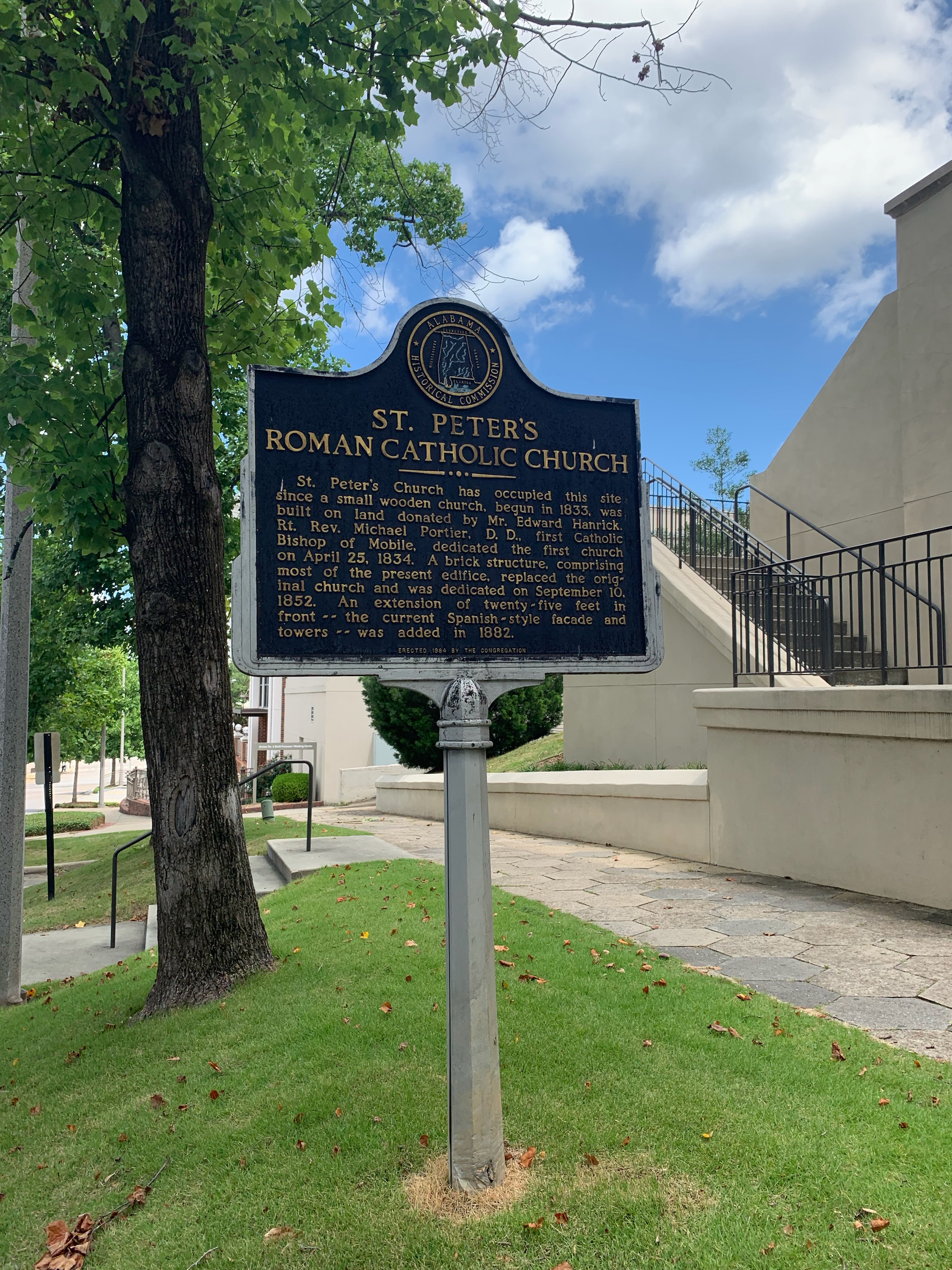
Historical marker

In 1922, fourteen stained glass windows were installed.

In September 1970, St. Peter Catholic Church started undergoing a complete renovation.

In late April 2000, St. Peter Catholic Church began the most significant renovation it has had since the 1890s. The renovation cost $700,000 and was paid for by members of the congregation who raised the money or donated it. A clear protective covering was put over the stained glass windows, which cost $54,000. The heating and cooling system was completely replaced, in addition to ten radiators, costing $70,000. The entire coffered ceiling was repainted as well.

=== Baptisms ===
St. Peter Catholic Church performed baptisms of enslaved people from 1851 to 1872. Reverend A.M. Pellicer performed the baptisms from August 23, 1851 to 1855. Reverend A.D. Pellicer performed the baptisms from 1856 to 1861. After Reverend A.D. Pellicer was re-located, he continued to visit the church to perform the baptisms until 1864. The next pastor, Reverend Dominic Manucy, performed the baptisms from 1866 to 1872. It was recorded that 168 enslaved people were baptized from December 15, 1861 to 1865.

=== Rectory ===
The church's original, victorian style rectory, which stood for 110 years, was torn down in April 1968. In its place a newer, bigger rectory was built along with a parish hall and a Sunday school. The new rectory, which currently stands, cost $126,000 to build. The construction occurred from August 1968 to May 1969. The builder was Richard Compton, a local contractor, and the architect was Joseph C. Maschi Construction.

=== Nursery ===
The nursery at St. Peter Catholic Church was thought of and put in motion by Reverend Francis Cusack in 1972. Reverend Cusack opened three nurseries all at the same time for different age groups, and all were staffed by volunteers. The nurseries were open for all three Masses on Sunday. Many parishioners donated toys and equipment such as small tables, benches, and tricycles. When Reverend Cusack was re-located from St. Peter, the new pastor, Reverend Michael McGuinness, continued the running of the nursery.

== Architecture ==
=== Exterior ===
The church's exterior was heavily influenced by Spanish Colonial styles due to a pastor who heavily financed the building, Reverend Anthony Dominic Pellicer, who initially received financial support from Mexico. The roof was made with red tile and had stuccoed walls.

=== Interior ===
However, the interior style is not Spanish Colonial but rather Romanesque Revival. St. Peter Catholic Church is the oldest standing romanesque revival building in Alabama. The interior was styled according to a traditional rectangular basilica plan, used since the fourth century. Three custom wooden altars were installed in the 1890s, replacing less elaborate ones. They were made in a Victorian Romanesque style, painted cream, and trimmed in gold, and almost reached the ceiling. The high altar features a statue of Jesus in the middle with a separate angel statue on each side. The left altar displays a statue of the Virgin Mary and the right displays St. Joseph and The Holy Child. The interior also holds fourteen Victorian style, stained glass windows. Dating from 1922, these windows were made by Emil Frei Art Glass Co. of St. Louis and Munich in Germany. The small statues for the stations of the cross along the walls are made out of polychrome plaster.

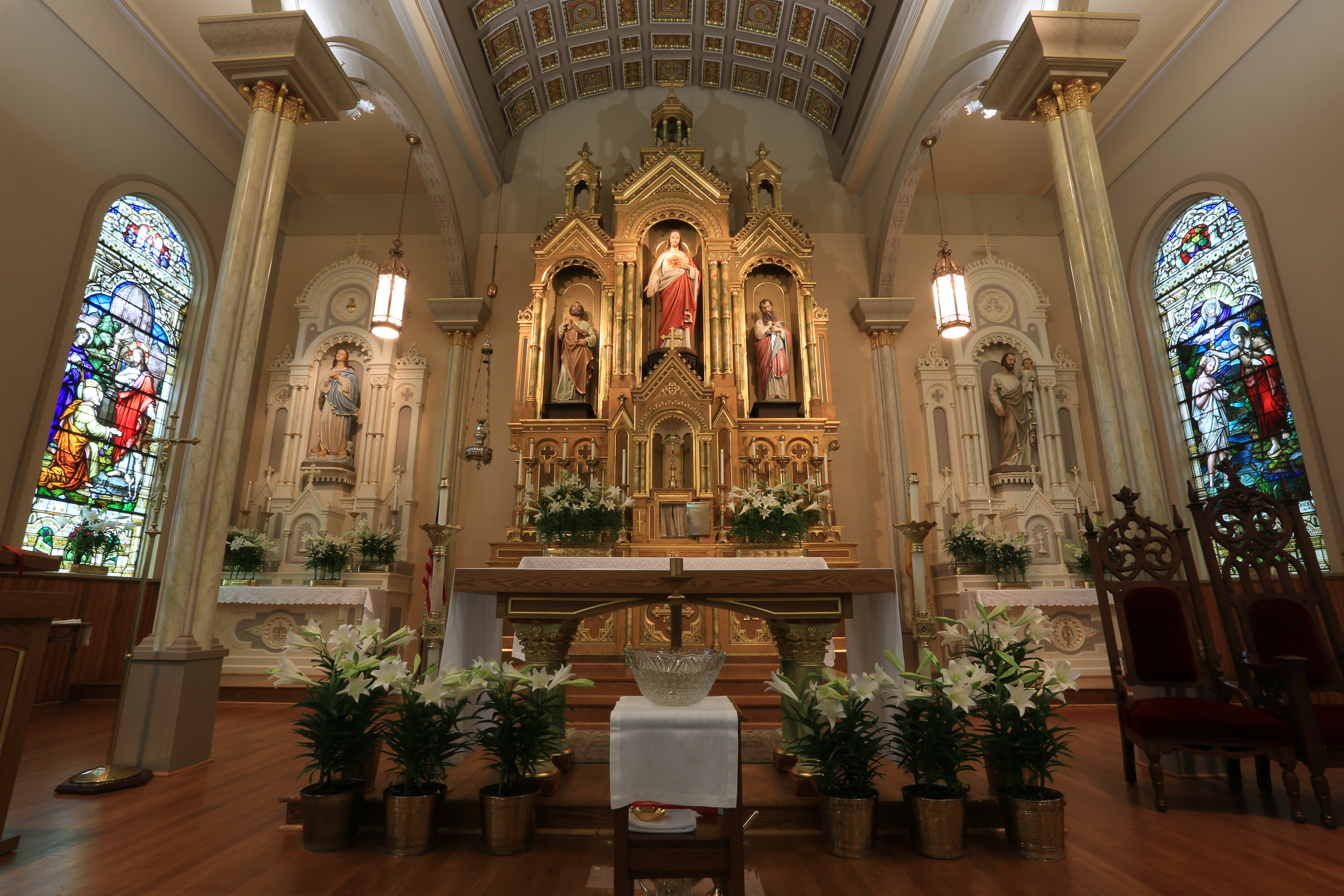

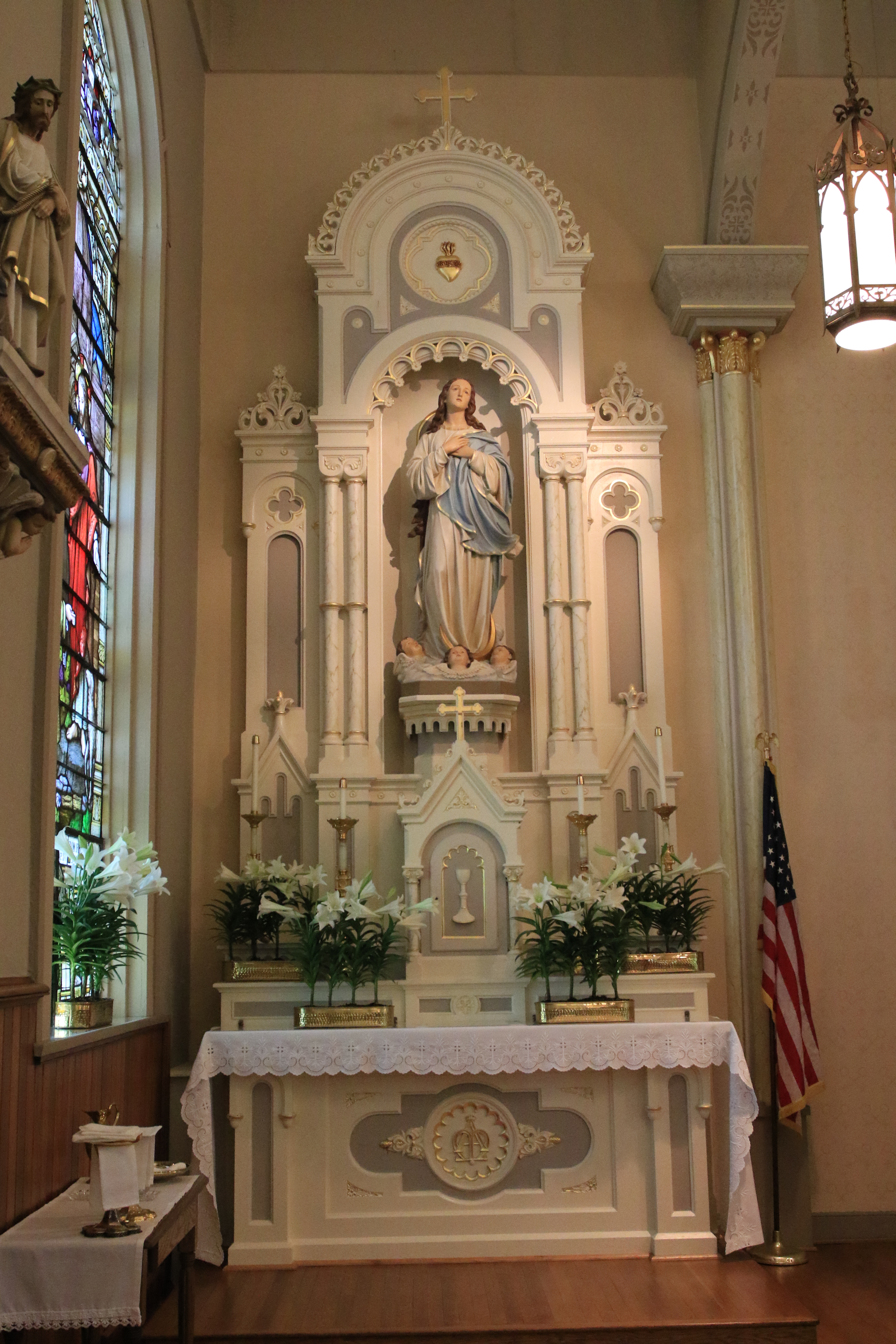

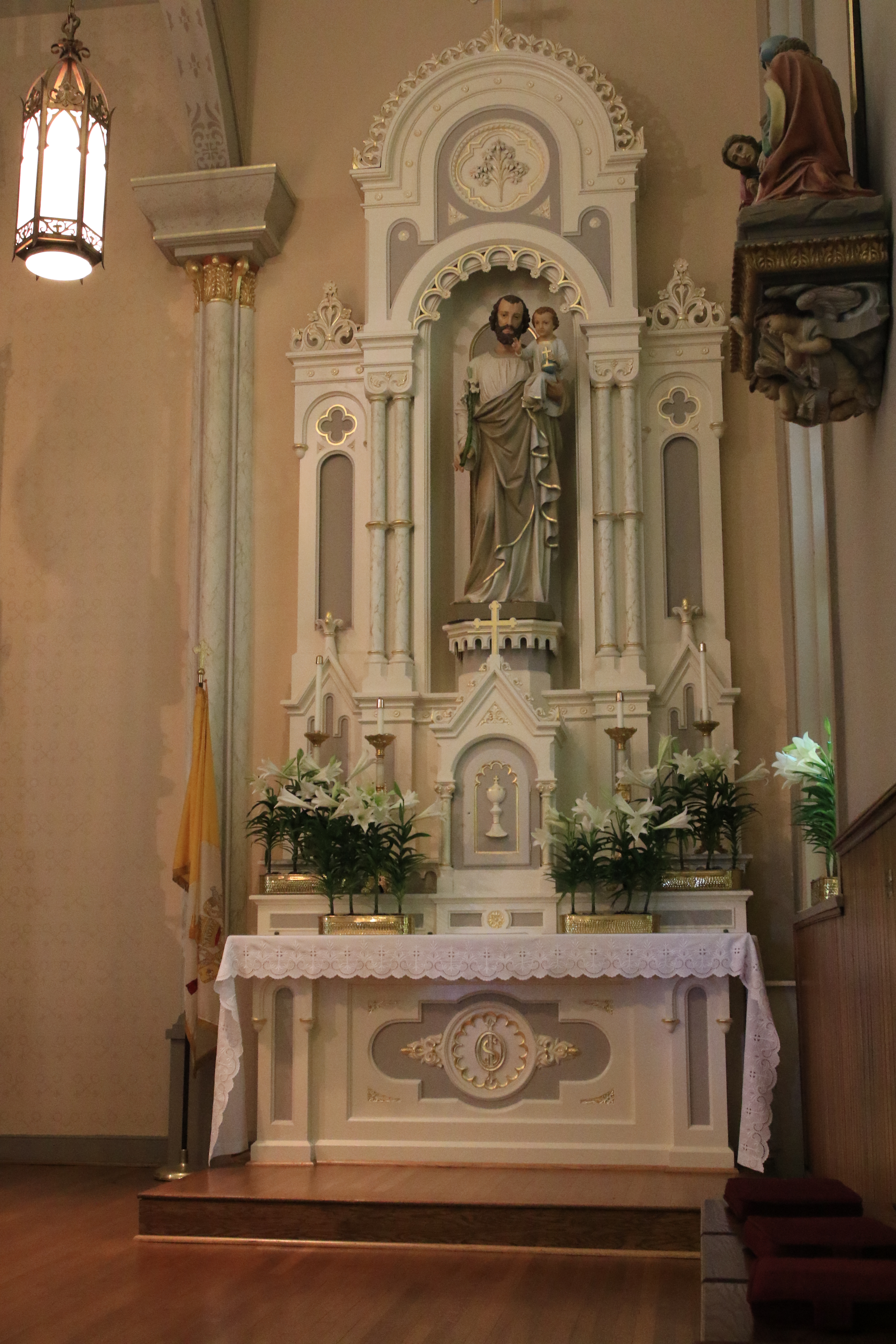

=== Pipe organ ===
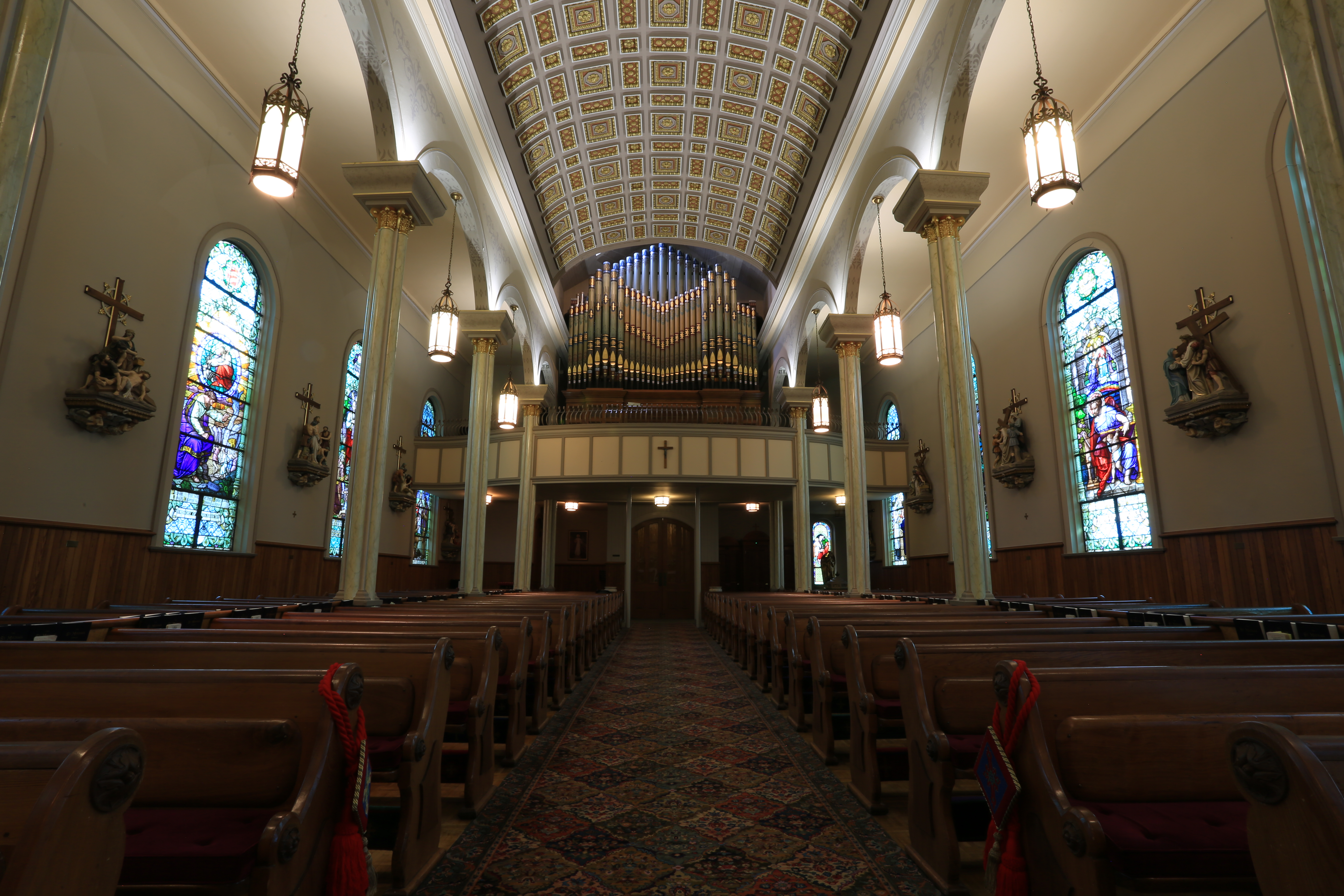
Pipe organ

St. Peter Catholic Church has the largest functioning pipe organ in the city. Stenciled with grey, olive, and brown and decorated with gold and silver leaf, the 1891 Kilgen Pipe Organ cost $380,000 originally. Twenty-seven of the 2,150 pipes in the set were replaced in the 1992 restoration of the set. Prior to the restoration, the organ set was silent for almost thirty years.

== Pastors ==
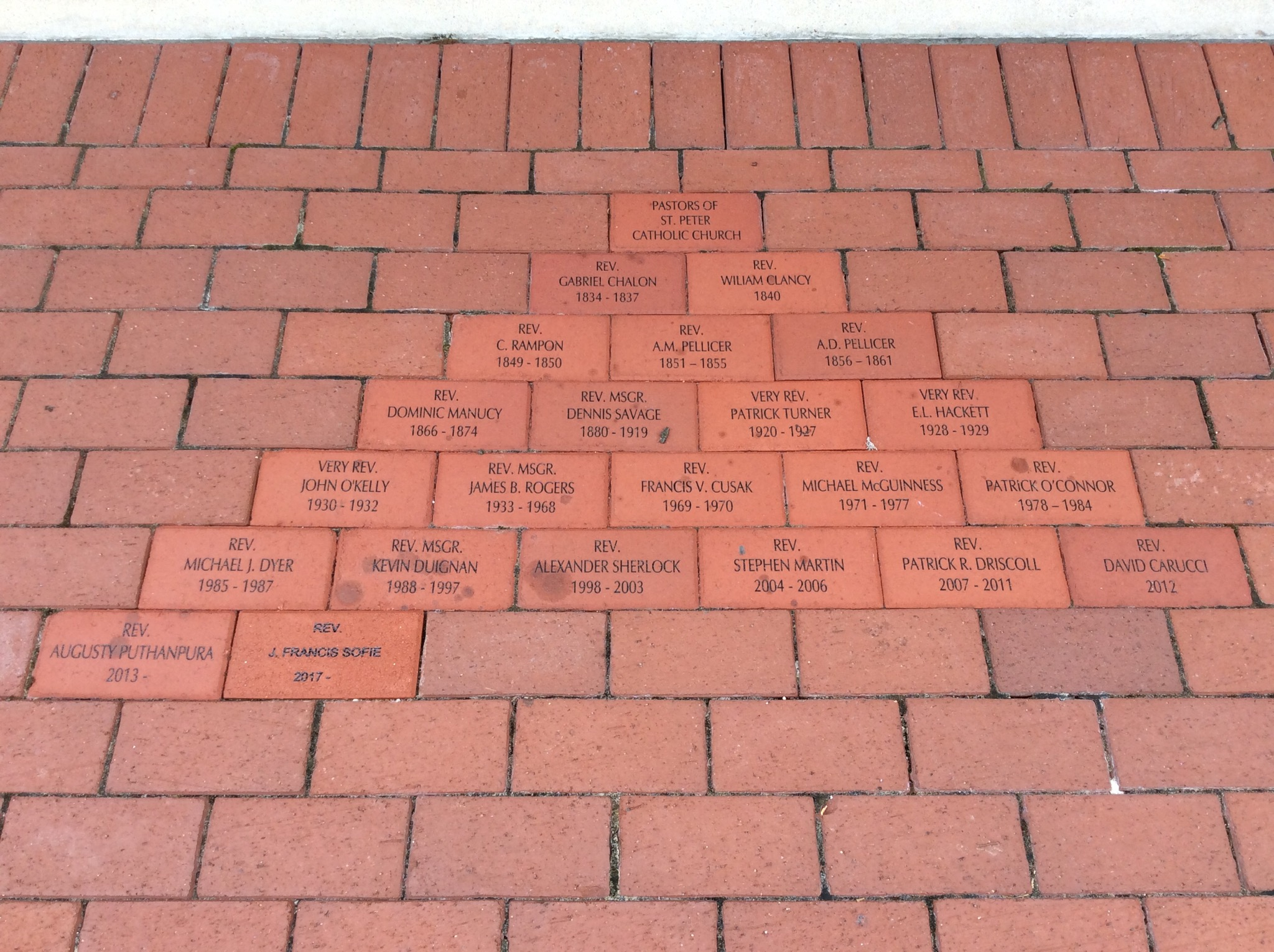
Brick mementos

- Gabriel Chalon: 1834 - 1837
- Wiliam Clancy: 1840
- C. Rampon: 1849 - 1850
- A.M. Pellicer: 1851 - 1855
- A.D. Pellicer: 1856 - 1861
- Dominic Manucy: 1866 - 1874
- (Monsignor) Dennis Savage: 1880 - 1919
- Patrick Turner: 1920 - 1927
- E.L Hackett: 1928 - 1929
- John O'Kelly: 1930 - 1932
- (Monsignor) James B. Rogers: 1933 - 1968
- Francis V. Cusak: 1969 - 1970
- Michael McGuinness: 1971 - 1977
- Patrick O'Connor: 1978 - 1984
- Michael J. Dyer: 1985 - 1987
- (Monsignor) Kevin Duignan: 1988 - 1997
- Alexander Sherlock: 1998 - 2003
- Stephen Martin: 2004 - 2006
- Patrick R. Driscoll: 2007 - 2011
- David Carucci: 2012
- Augusty Puthanpura: 2013- 2017
- Francis Sofie: 2018 - 2019
- Saleth Mariadoss: 2019 - .

=== Notable pastors ===
Reverend Anthony Dominic Pellicer: consecrated as a Bishop on December 8, 1874, at the Cathedral in Mobile, Alabama; appointed Titular Bishop of Selma and Vicar Apostolic of Brownsville, Texas

Reverend Dominic Manucy: consecrated as a Bishop on December 8, 1874, at the Cathedral in Mobile, Alabama; appointed the first Bishop (then Vicar Apostolic shortly after) of San Antonio, Texas

Reverend E.J Hackett: appointed the title of Monsignor in 1928; appointed Vicar General of the Mobile Diocese in 1929.
