= Geru Siah =

Geru Siah گروسياه
- Village
- Location within Iran
- Coordinates: 27°37′47″N 57°13′30″E
- Country: Iran
- Province: Hormozgan
- County: Rudan
- Bakhsh: Central
- Rural District: Rahdar

Population (2006)
  - Total: 38
- Time zone: UTC+3:30 (IRST)
  - Summer (DST): UTC+4:30 (IRDT)

Geru Siah (Persian: گروسياه, also Romanized as Gerū Sīāh; also known as Gerūsīā) is a village in Rahdar Rural District, in the Central District of Rudan County, Hormozgan Province, Iran. At the 2006 census, its population was 38, in 10 families.
