= Garu, Pakistan =

Garu گرو
- Location within Pakistan
- Country: Pakistan
- Province: Khyber Pakhtunkhwa
- District: Nowshera District
- Elevation: 404 m (1,325 ft)
- Time zone: UTC+5 (PST)

Garu is a village in Nowshera District in the Khyber Pakhtunkhwa province of Pakistan. It is located at 33.49°N 71.59°E with an altitude of 404 metres (1328 feet).
