= Archdiocese of Mobile =

Catholic jurisdiction in Alabama, US

Coordinates: 30°41′21″N 88°02′46″W

Metropolitan Archdiocese of Mobile Archidiœcesis Metropolitae Mobiliensis
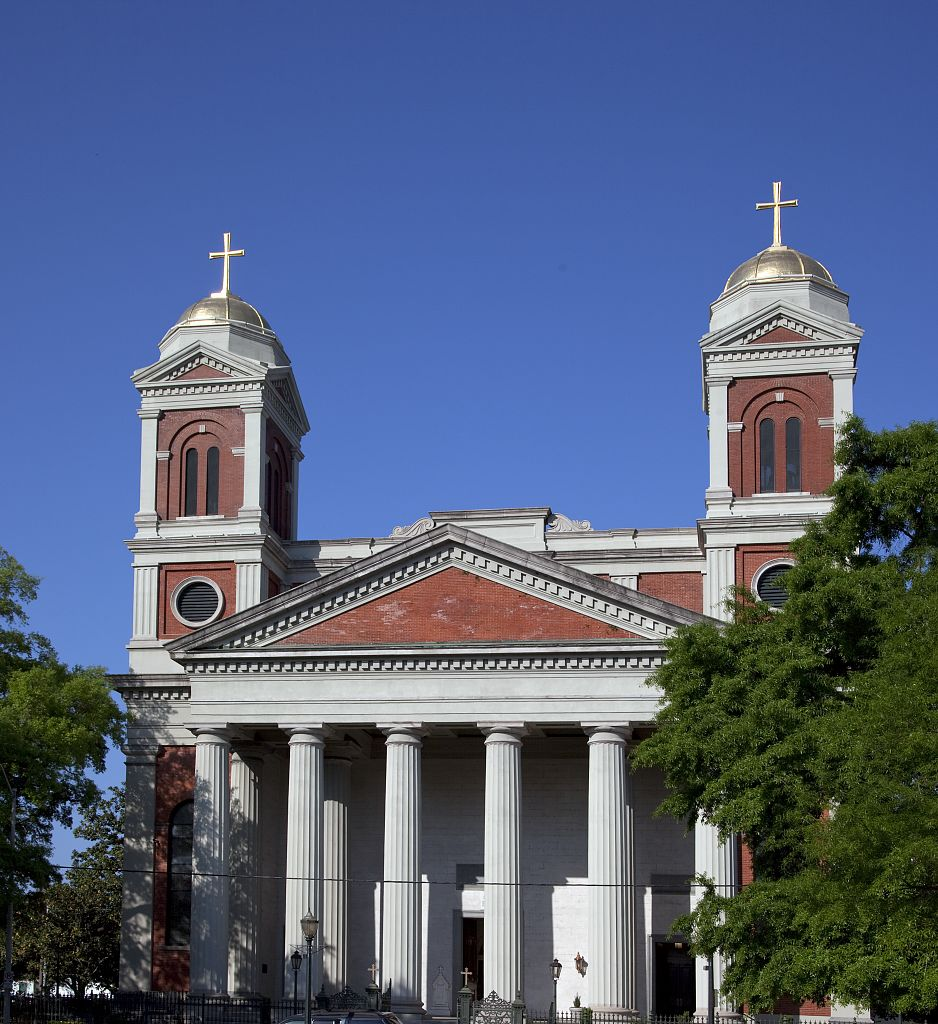
- Cathedral Basilica of the Immaculate Conception

- Coat of arms

Location
- Country: United States
- Territory: Lower half of Alabama
- Ecclesiastical province: Province of Mobile

Statistics
- Area: 59,467 km^{2} (22,960 sq mi)
- Population: Total; Catholics: (as of 2023); 1,852,080; 107,870 (5.8%)
- Parishes: 76
- Schools: 20

Information
- Denomination: Catholic
- Sui iuris church: Latin Church
- Rite: Roman Rite
- Established: 1825
- Cathedral: Cathedral Basilica of the Immaculate Conception
- Patron saint: Immaculate Conception (Primary); Irenaeus of Lyons, Michael the Archangel (Secondary)

Current leadership
- Pope: Leo XIV
- Metropolitan Archbishop: Mark Steven Rivituso
- Vicar General: William J. Skoneki
- Judicial Vicar: James S. Kee
- Bishops emeritus: Thomas John Rodi

Map
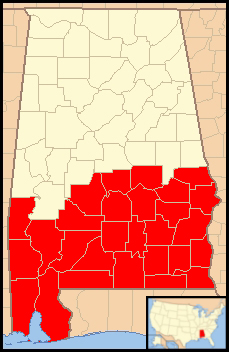

Website
- mobarch.org

The Archdiocese of Mobile (Latin: Archidiœcesis Mobiliensis) is an archdiocese of the Catholic Church in southern Alabama in the United States. It was established as the Archdiocese of Mobile in 1980. The Cathedral Basilica of the Immaculate Conception in Mobile, Alabama, is the mother church.

== Territory ==
The Archdiocese of Mobile encompasses 22,969 square miles with 76 parishes and seven missions and a total Catholic population of approximately 107,870. It comprises the counties of Autauga, Baldwin, Barbour, Bullock, Butler, Choctaw, Clarke, Coffee, Conecuh, Covington, Crenshaw, Dale, Dallas, Elmore, Escambia, Geneva, Henry, Houston, Lee, Lowndes, Macon, Mobile, Monroe, Montgomery, Pike, Russell, Washington, and Wilcox.

== Statistics ==
As of 2023, 5.8% people within the territory encompassed by the Archdiocese of Mobile are Catholic (107,870 out of 1,852,080 total population). This represents a growth of 20% since the year 2000 when 4.8% of the population identified as Catholic.

== Name changes ==
The present day Archdiocese of Mobile has undergone several name changes over the past 200 years:

- Vicariate Apostolic of Alabama and the Floridas (1825 to 1829)
- Diocese of Mobile (1829 to 1954)
- Diocese of Mobile-Birmingham (1954 to 1969)
- Diocese of Mobile (1969 to 1980)
- Archdiocese of Mobile (1980 to present)

== History ==
=== 1700 to 1829 ===
In 1703, the first Catholic church in present-day Alabama, the Church of Fort Louis de la Louisiane, was founded by French explores at present-day Mobile. That next year, Henri Roulleaux De la Vente became the first resident priest in the new settlement, under the authority of the Diocese of Quebec.

With the end of the French and Indian War in 1763, the British took control of the French colonies east of the Mississippi River, including Mobile. The British mandated that the French Catholic landowners in the colony swear allegiance to the Church of England. As a result, most of them migrated to New Orleans, now held by Catholic Spain. In 1790, during the American Revolution, the Spanish took Mobile from the British. In 1793, the Vatican erected the Diocese of Louisiana and the Two Floridas centered in New Orleans to serve Catholics in the Spanish colonies.

In 1813, American forces captured Mobile. Eight years later in 1821, Spain sold all of their American colonies to the United States. Recognizing these changes, Pope Leo XII in 1825 erected the Vicariate Apostolic of Alabama and the Floridas. The pope named Monsignor Michael Portier as the vicar apostolic.

The new vicariate included all of Alabama, East and West Florida, and the Arkansas Territory. At the time of his accession, Portier was the only clergyman in the vicariate; he had two churches in the Floridas and one in Mobile, with an estimated Catholic population of 6,000. Portier began his administration by riding through his vicariate, offering communion, preaching, and administering the sacraments.

=== 1829 to 1859 ===
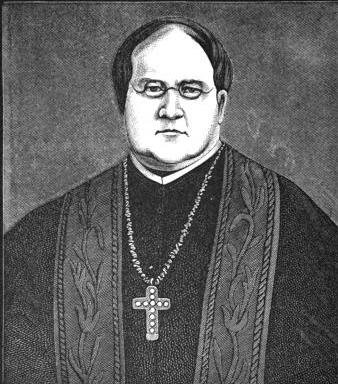
Bishop Portier (pre-1890)

In 1829, Pope Pius VIII erected the Diocese of Mobile, taking the Florida Territory and Alabama from the vicariate. Portier became the first bishop of Mobile.

Portier's cathedral in Mobile was a small church 20 feet wide by 50 feet deep, his residence a still smaller two-roomed frame structure. In 1827, the cathedral was destroyed in a fire that ravaged the city. In 1830, Portier established Spring Hill College in Mobile, the first institution of higher learning in Alabama. That same year, Portier sent his priests into interiors part of Alabama to minister to small clusters of Catholics in the area. In 1833, Portier brought a group of nuns from Georgetown Visitation Monastery in Washington, D.C. to establish the Convent and Academy of the Visitation for the education of girls in Mobile. St. Peter's Church in Montgomery, Alabama, the first Catholic church in that city, was constructed in 1834.

Portier started construction of a new cathedral in Mobile in 1837. Saint John's Parish, the first Catholic parish in Tuscaloosa, Alabama, was established in 1844. Portier brought the Brothers of the Sacred Heart from France to the diocese about 1847, and the Daughters of Charity from Emmitsburg, Maryland, to manage orphan asylums for boys and girls, respectively. In 1850, Portier consecrated the Cathedral Basilica of the Immaculate Conception in Mobile. That same year, Pope Pius IX erected the Diocese of Savannah and moved eastern Florida out of the Diocese of Mobile. In Rome at this time, Portier returned to Mobile with another priest and several seminarians.

In 1854, Know Nothing elements in Mobile forced the Daughters of Charity to leave the City Hospital, spreading false charges of mismanagement. In reaction, the Catholic community raised funds to start Providence Infirmary for the sisters. Within five years, the City Hospital had requested the sisters return to their facility to reverse its decline.

=== 1859 to 1896 ===
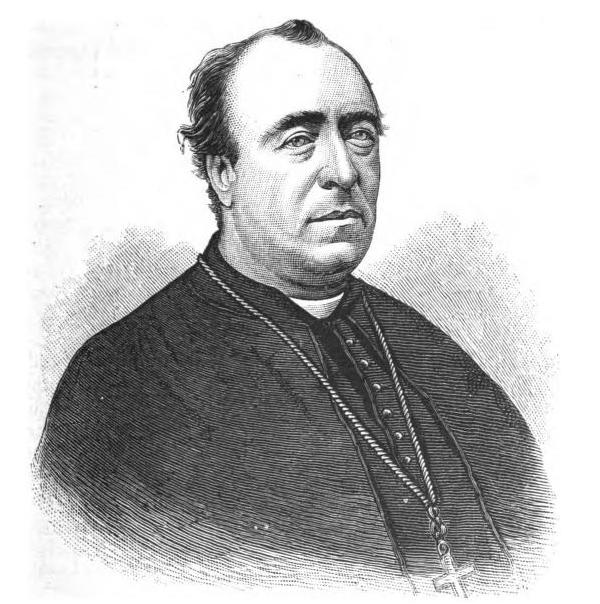
Bishop Quinlan (1887)

After Portier died in 1859, Pope Pius IX named John Quinlan as the second bishop of Mobile. When he took office, the Catholic population of Alabama was approximately 10,000. Unlike many other states, there were few immigrant Catholics in Alabama. In 1860, Quinlan traveled to Ireland, France and Rome, hoping to raise funds and recruit more priests for the diocese. During the American Civil War of the early 1860s, several priests from the diocese served as chaplains for the Confederate States Army. Quinlan himself was a strong supporter of the Confederacy. In 1861, several Sisters of Charity travelled to Pensacola, Florida, to work in a military hospital there. When Mobile was occupied by the Union Army in 1865, Catholic churches and facilities did not suffer any damage. Quinlan died in 1883.

The third bishop of Mobile was Dominic Manucy, nominated in January 1884. However, he resigned in September 1884 due to poor health. Jeremiah O'Sullivan was his successor. O'Sullivan was successful in restoring the financial status of the diocese. He also established several new churches, chapels, and schools, and oversaw the addition of two towers to the Cathedral of the Immaculate Conception. O'Sullivan died in 1896.

=== 1896 to 1954 ===
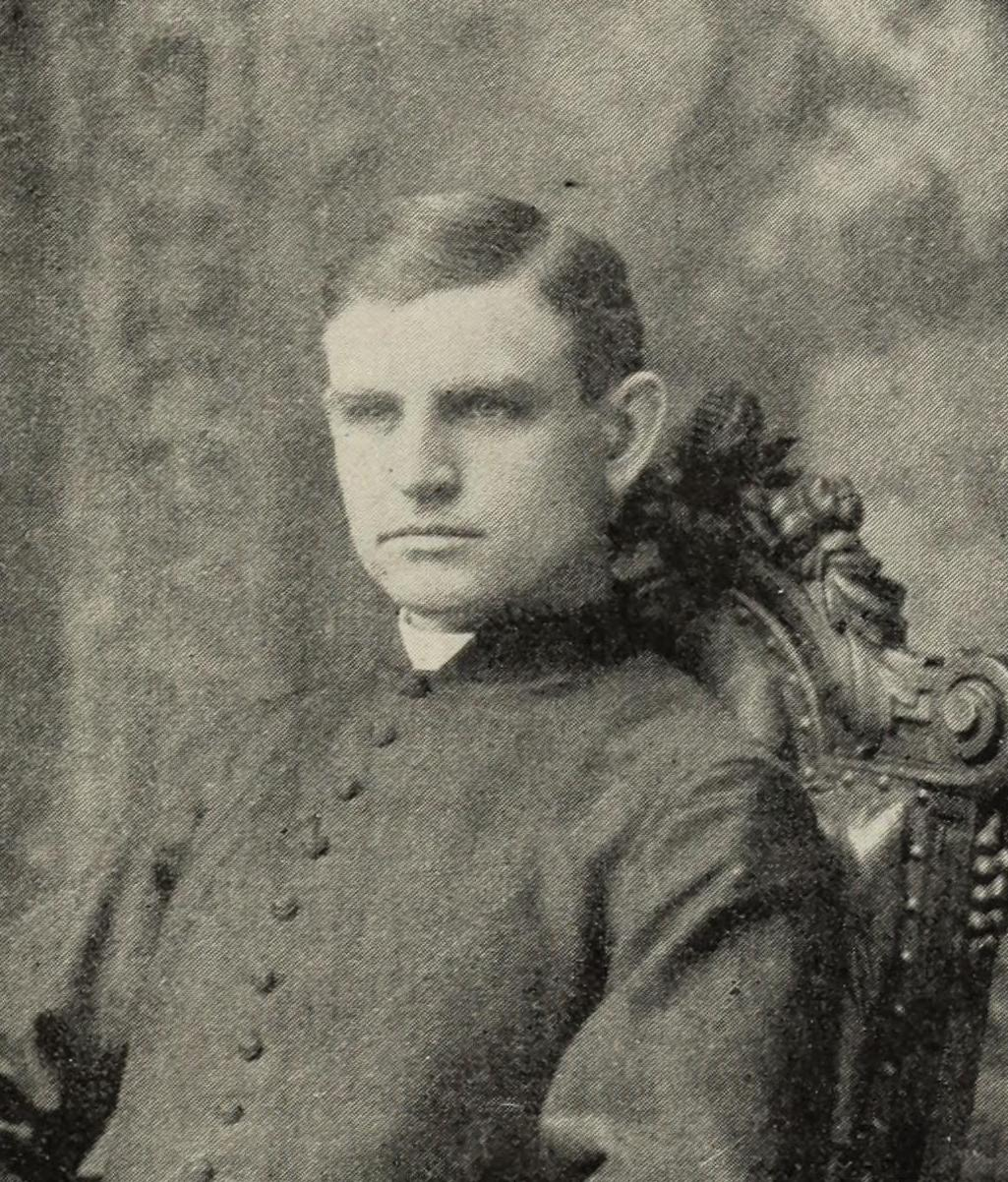
Bishop Allen (1889)

In 1897, Edward Allen was appointed the fifth Bishop of Mobile. During Allen's administration, the Catholic population of the diocese increased from 18,000 to 48,000, and the number of priests more than doubled. He also established several new churches, hospitals, orphanages, and schools. The diocese was devastated by a major hurricane in 1906; many churches were either totally or partially destroyed, but were rebuilt or repaired under Allen's direction. Deeply concerned for the African American community, he invited the Josephite Fathers to direct the black missions in the diocese, founded St. Joseph's College in order to "educate young colored men to be catechists and teachers," and sanctioned the establishment of the Knights of Peter Claver. Allen died in 1926.

Pope Pius XI in 1927 selected Thomas Toolen to be the next bishop of Mobile. In connection with the centennial celebration of the diocese, he erected Allen Memorial Hospital in honor of his predecessor Allen in December 1929. In 1941, Toolen prohibited Catholic parents who sent their children to public schools from receiving the sacraments.

=== 1954 to 1968 ===
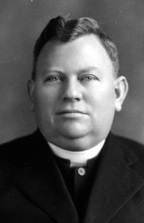
Bishop Toolen (1927)

In 1954, Pope Pius XII renamed the Diocese of Mobile as the Diocese of Mobile-Birmingham to reflect the growth of Birmingham, Alabama. Toolen opened several new churches, orphanages, hospitals, and other institutions that were meant to minister exclusively to African-Americans, leading opponents to call him "the nigger bishop". In 1950, he oversaw construction of St. Martin de Porres Hospital in Mobile, which was the first hospital in Alabama where African American doctors could work alongside their white colleagues. He also persuaded a local hospital to become the first one in Alabama to accept pregnant African-American women. In 1948, however, he denied the request of Joseph Howze, an African-American to be accepted as a seminarian for the diocese.

In 1957, Toolen invited Mother Mary Angelica and the Poor Clares of Perpetual Adoration to establish a religious community for African-Americans in the diocese. He broke ground on Our Lady of the Angels Monastery in Irondale in 1961, and dedicated the monastery in 1962. Eternal Word Television Network would be established here in 1981. In 1964, Toolen ended racial segregation in Catholic schools throughout Alabama. He wrote: "I ask all of our people to accept this decision as best for God and country."

However, Toolen denounced the methods of civil rights activists, favoring a less confrontational approach to civil rights. In 1965, Toolen ordered the Society of Saint Edmund to remove Maurice Ouellet from his post as pastor in Selma. Ouellet had allowed his rectory to serve as a headquarters for participants in the 1965 Selma to Montgomery marches.

=== 1968 to 1980 ===
Pope Paul VI in 1968 erected the Diocese of St. Augustine, removing all of Florida from the Diocese of Mobile-Birmingham. In June 1969, the pope erected the Diocese of Birmingham in Alabama, separating northern Alabama from what became again the Diocese of Mobile. Toolen resigned as bishop in September 1969. Paul VI named Auxiliary Bishop John L. May of Chicago as the bishop of the second Diocese of Mobile. During his 10-year-long tenure in Mobile, May established eight parishes and two deaneries, dedicated twelve churches, founded two schools, and erected a convent. He also dedicated several other institutions, including parish centers, elderly homes, and a new wing and intensive-care unit at Providence Hospital.

May continued to implement the liturgical reforms of the Second Vatican Council, authorizing the laity to distribute communion, the reception of communion in the hand, and a new rite for the Sacrament of Penance. He founded an Office of Youth Ministry, Diocesan Pastoral Council, and Diocesan Board of Catholic Education. May also established a retirement program for all lay church employees, a new health insurance program, a marriage preparation program, and anti-abortion programs. In 1977, he imposed a term limit of six years for parish priests in the diocese. He ordained the diocese's first class of permanent deacons in 1979. In 1980, May became archbishop of St. Louis.

=== 1980 to present ===
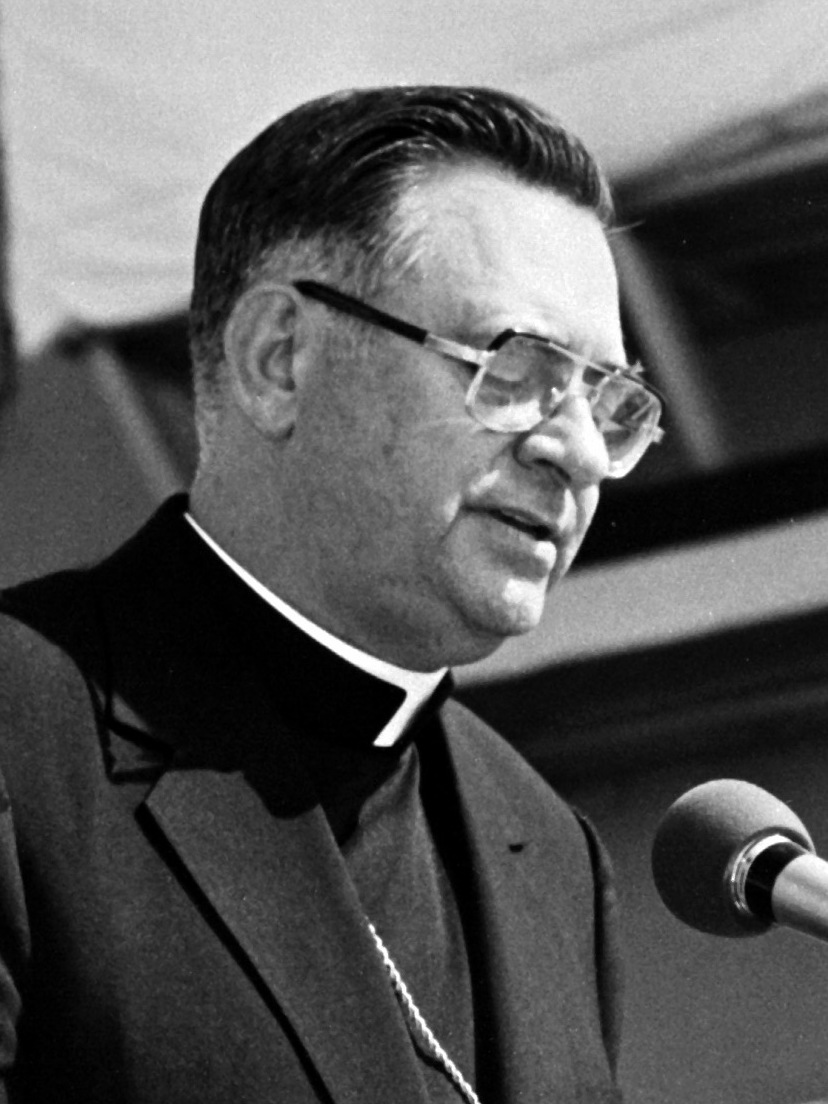
Archbishop Lipscomb (1985)

On November 16, 1980, Pope John Paul II erected the Archdiocese of Mobile. He designated the Dioceses of Birmingham, Biloxi and Jackson as suffragan dioceses of the new archdiocese. The pope appointed Oscar Lipscomb of Mobile as the first archbishop of Mobile.

In 1993, David Trosch, an archdiocesan priest in Magnolia Springs, started advocating the theory of justifiable homicide as a justification for killing medical professionals providing abortion services to women. Trosch then attempted to place an advertisement in the Mobile Press-Register newspaper with a cartoon showing a man pointing a gun at a doctor holding a knife over a pregnant woman. The Press-Register did not published the ad. Lipscomb offered Trosch "the alternative of publicly abiding by the [Archbishop's] judgment on this erroneous teaching or relinquishing his public position in the church." Lipscomb removed Trosch from his pastoral assignments in August 1993, allowing him to continue celebrating mass but banning him from any "...public persona in the Church".

When Lipscomb retired in 2008, Bishop Thomas Rodi of Biloxi succeeded him. Bishop Mark Rivituso became bishop on July 1, 2025.

=== Reports of sexual abuse ===
In December 2018, Archbishop Rodi released the names of 29 priests and religious order clergy with credible accusations of sexual abuse of minors while serving in the Archdiocese of Mobile, dating back to 1950. At least two Catholic clergy on this list were convicted, with one other being sued. Rodi also issued an apology and asked for forgiveness.

In July 2023, Alexander Crow, a 30-year-old priest, abandoned his clerical duties and left for Europe with an 18-year-old girl who had just graduated from the McGill-Toolen Catholic High School. He was immediately removed from his position as the parochial vicar at Corpus Christi Parish. Mobile County Sheriff Paul Burch announced that the two had not had intimate relations.

== Bishops ==
=== Vicariate Apostolic of Alabama and the Floridas ===
Michael Portier (1825–1859)

=== Bishops of Mobile ===
1. Michael Portier (1825–1859)
2. John Quinlan (1859–1883)
3. Dominic Manucy (1884)
4. Jeremiah O'Sullivan (1885–1896)
5. Edward Patrick Allen (1897–1926)
6. Thomas Joseph Toolen (1927–1954), title changed with title of diocese; also elevated to Archbishop ad personam in 1954

=== Bishop of Mobile-Birmingham ===
Thomas Joseph Toolen (1954–1969), archbishop ad personam

=== Bishop of Mobile ===
John Lawrence May (1969–1980), appointed Archbishop of Saint Louis

=== Archbishops of Mobile ===
1. Oscar Hugh Lipscomb (1980–2008)
2. Thomas John Rodi (2008–2025)
3. Mark Steven Rivituso (2025–present)

=== Former auxiliary bishops ===
- Joseph Aloysius Durick (1954–1964), appointed Coadjutor Bishop of Nashville and subsequently succeeded to that see
- Joseph Gregory Vath (1966–1969), appointed Bishop of Birmingham in Alabama 1969–1987

=== Other diocesan priests who became bishops ===
- John Stephen (Jean Étienne) Bazin, appointed Bishop of Vincennes in 1847
- Anthony Dominic Ambrose Pellicer, appointed Bishop of San Antonio in 1874
- John William Shaw, appointed Coadjutor Bishop of San Antonio in 1910
- William Benedict Friend, appointed Auxiliary Bishop of Alexandria-Shreveport in 1979
- William Russell Houck, appointed Auxiliary Bishop of Jackson in 1979

== Education ==
=== High Schools and Middle Schools ===
==== High Schools ====
- McGill-Toolen Catholic High School – Mobile
- Montgomery Catholic Preparatory School – Montgomery
- St. Michael Catholic High School – Fairhope

==== Middle Schools ====
Montgomery Catholic Preparatory School – Montgomery
