= Garu, Qaleh Ganj =

Garu گارو
- Village
- Location within Iran
- Coordinates: 26°51′37″N 58°49′25″E
- Country: Iran
- Province: Kerman
- County: Qaleh Ganj
- Bakhsh: Chah Dadkhoda
- Rural District: Rameshk

Population (2006)
  - Total: 614
- Time zone: UTC+3:30 (IRST)
  - Summer (DST): UTC+4:30 (IRDT)

Garu (Persian: گارو, also Romanized as Gārū; also known as Qārūn) is a village in Rameshk Rural District, Chah Dadkhoda District, Qaleh Ganj County, Kerman Province, Iran. At the 2006 census, the village population comprised 614 residents, in 150 families.
