= John Quinlan (bishop) =

Catholic bishop

The Very Reverend John Quinlan
- Bishop of Mobile
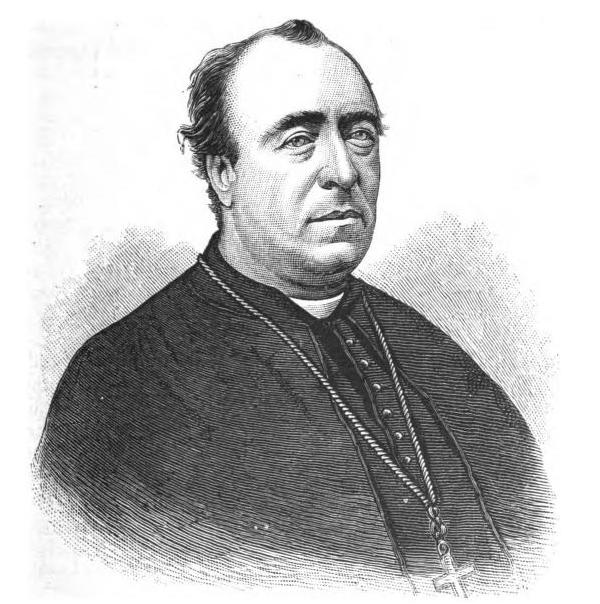
- Church: Catholic
- Diocese: Mobile
- Appointed: 19 August 1859
- Predecessor: Michael Portier
- Successor: Dominic Mauncy

Orders
- Ordination: 30 August 1852 by John Baptist Purcell
- Consecration: 4 December 1859 by Antoine Blanc

Personal details
- Born: 19 October 1826 Cloyne, Ireland
- Died: 9 March 1883 (aged 56)

Styles of John Quinlan
- Reference style: The Most Reverend
- Spoken style: His Excellency
- Religious style: Monsignor

Bishop John Quinlan (October 19, 1826, Cloyne, County Cork, Ireland – March 9, 1883, Alabama) was a Catholic bishop and the second Bishop of Mobile.

== Biography ==
=== Early life ===
John Quinlan was born on 19 October 1826 in Cloyne, Ireland, and immigrated to the United States when he was 18, in 1844. He was accepted as a seminarian for the Archdiocese of Cincinnati by John Baptist Purcell, and sent to Mount St. Mary's University for studies. On August 30, 1852, he was ordained a priest by bishop Purcell.

=== Priesthood ===
Quinlan's first assignment as a priest was in Piqua, Ohio, before serving as curate for future Archbishop of Philadelphia James Wood at St. Patrick's Church in Cincinnati. Following this, he served as rector of Mount Saint Marys of the West before being appointed the second bishop of the Diocese of Mobile on August 19, 1859, and consecrated a bishop by Antoine Blanc on December 4 of that same year.

=== Episcopacy ===
In his diocese he found twelve churches and fourteen schools for which he had only eight secular priests and he therefore brought from Ireland eleven young candidates for the priesthood. Bishop Quinlan's administration fell upon the storm days of the American Civil War. After the battle of Shiloh, he hastened on a special train to the blood-stained battle-ground and ministered to the temporal and spiritual wants of North and South.

After the war diocesan activities were crippled. Nevertheless, besides repairing ruined churches, Bishop Quinlan built the portico of the Mobile cathedral, founded St. Patrick's and St. Mary's churches in the same city, and established churches in Huntsville, Decatur, Tuscumbia, Florence, Cullman, Birmingham, Eufaula, Whistler, and Toulminville.

In April 1876, Bishop Quinlan invited the Benedictines from St. Vincent's Abbey, Pennsylvania to the diocese, and they settled at Cullman, Alabama.

He died March 9, 1883, and is entombed under the portico of the Cathedral Basilica of the Immaculate Conception in Mobile, Alabama.

Quinlan Hall, on the campus of Spring Hill College, is named in his honor.

== Episcopal succession ==
Catholic Church titles
| Preceded by Michael Portier | Bishop of Mobile; 1859–1883 | Succeeded by Dominic Manucy |
