= Peter M. H. Wynhoven =

Roman Catholic priest (1884–1944)

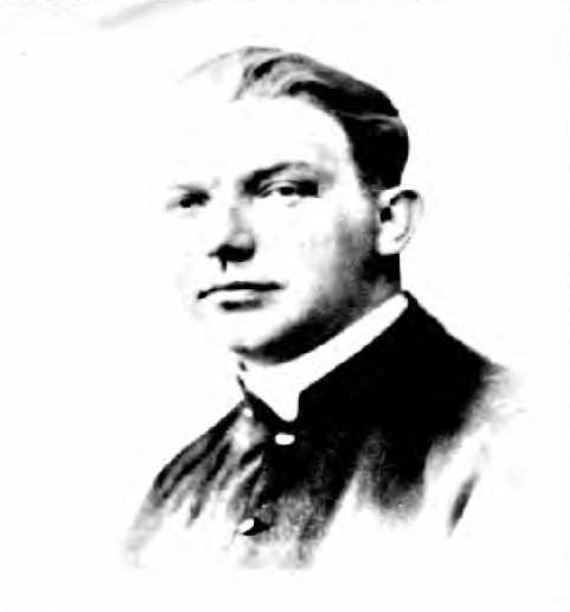
Father (Monsignor) Peter M.H. Wynhoven, ca 1922

Peter Mathias Hubertus Wynhoven (December 31, 1884 – September 14, 1944) was an ordained Roman Catholic priest that was born in Holland and practiced in the metropolitan area of New Orleans, Louisiana, during the first half of the 20th century. He was well known for implementing and leading philanthropic and humanitarian causes. In his charitable work for the public, Wynhoven was the founder of St. Vincent's Hotel, a temporary home designed to provide opportunities for destitute men, and Hope Haven and Madonna Manor, located in Marrero, Louisiana. He was also the founder and editor of The Catholic Action of the South, the official newspaper of the Archdiocese of New Orleans from 1932 to 1963. A native of Venray, Holland, Peter Wynhoven immigrated to the United States where he completed theologic studies at Kenrick Seminary and was ordained in June 1909. Over his life, he was recognized and commended by Pope Pius XI, Pope Pius XII, New Orleans archbishops Blenk, Shaw and Rummel, and U. S. President Franklin D. Roosevelt. He died of a heart attack at the age of 59 in Nahant, Massachusetts, and was interred at St. Don Bosco Chapel at Hope Haven.

== Early career ==
Peter Mathius Hubertus Wynhoven (given Dutch name Petrus Mathias Hubertus Wijnhoven) was born in Venray, Holland to Johannes Hubertus Wijnhoven and Anna Maria Theuws on December 30, 1884. He immigrated to the United States in September 1904 and attended the Kenrick-Glennan Seminary, a private Roman Catholic Seminary in Shrewsbury, Missouri. In 1909, he was ordained and initially assigned to a Sacred Heart of Jesus Church in Broussard, Louisiana. At the time, the church pastor was Arthur Drossaerts, who was originally from Holland, Wynhoven's home country. It may be speculated that this fact contributed to this position for Wynhoven's first appointment. Shortly afterwards, in 1910, he was next was assigned to the church parish of St. Francis of Assisi on Constance Street in New Orleans, where he served as the assistant pastor for three years.

In 1911, just two years ordained, Wynhoven saw the need to provide affordable housing for out-of-work men in New Orleans. With the support and endorsement of archbishop James Blenk and private philanthropy, Wynhoven created the St. Vincent's Hotel in the lower Pontalba Bldg. at 801 Decatur Street, which housed transient men for 10 cents per night. The concept was inspired by the successful "Father Tim Dempsey's Hotel for Men," a private institution run by Tim Dempsey in St. Louis, Missouri, just 10 miles from the Kenrick Seminary. From St. Vincent's, Wynhoven operated the Free Labor Bureau, which sought to find employment opportunities for the hotel's guests.

== Hope Haven/Madonna Manor ==
Extending from needs observed through the hotel, Wynhoven wished to create an industrial farm that would generate opportunities for the unemployed. The idea was well received and supported as it evolved. In December 1915, a purchase agreement was made for 346 acres near Shell Beach on Bayou La Loutre and approximately 34 miles downriver of New Orleans. But, the next month, another location was considered, the former Monsecor Plantation in Plaquemines Parish, with 1000 acres and existing improvements. Ultimately, in December 1916, with publicly donated money, a 500-acre plot on Lafitte Road along Bayou Barataria in Crown Point, Louisiana was purchased and given the name "Hope Haven Farm." The site was approximately 12 miles from New Orleans on the opposite side of the Mississippi River, below the intersection of Bayou Barataria and Harvey's Canal. Land was cleared and within a few years, the farm was thriving and self-sustaining.

In 1915, he was made pastor of the Our Lady of Sacred Heart Church on Canal Street and South Rendon, but the church soon after was destroyed during a hurricane that landed in Louisiana on September 30 that year. Afterwards, in 1917, he was appointed by Blenk to head the St. Joseph Church in Gretna, across the Mississippi River from New Orleans. At the time, the church parish extended from Gretna to Grand Isle, within which he would eventually come to build a total of six churches. The post was desired by Wynhoven as it would put him in close proximity to the industrial farm project, which was then within the limits of the church parish.

Wynhoven pondered the "down and out" men that were being served by St. Vincent's Hotel and reasoned that the cause of their plight usually went back into boyhood. Wynhoven believed that orphanages were unable to adequately provide for boys after 12 years of age who were in danger of falling into "evil ways" if thrown to their own resources. Thus, the industrial farm concept evolved from one that would provide job opportunities for destitute men to one to nurture and train orphan teenage boys. The "Hope Haven Farm" enterprise then gave rise to an evolved function as "Hope Haven Agricultural and Mechanical (A&M) School," which would be developed on newly acquired land on Barataria Blvd, totalling 140 acres in Marrero. Wynhoven proclaimed, "give the kid a chance, and the man will take care of himself."

By 1922, Wynhoven's plans for Hope Haven were well defined, and funds were raised to create a school to house, educate and train orphaned boys between the ages of 12 and 18. Ground was broken by September 1924 and the first buildings developed were dairy barns, silos, administration buildings and cottage dormitories. Wynhoven recruited a friend from Holland, Thomas Jenniskens, to help develop and manage the farm. Six brothers from the Franciscan Order, who were specialists in teaching trades at similar orphanages in Europe, came from Germany to guide 200 orphaned boys housed at Hope Haven. The goal was to train them to become tradesmen and industrial workers. In May 1933, a staff of ten priests and lay brothers from the order of Salesian Fathers, whose mission was the training and education of the children of the poor, arrived at Hope Haven for the purpose of teaching agriculture, carpentry, book binding and printing.

During the Great Depression, archbishop John Shaw of New Orleans sought to expand the purpose and function of Hope Haven and in 1931 he promoted a plan to create Madonna Manor on the Hope Haven Farm run by Wynhoven. The new facility was constructed in 1932 across Barataria Blvd. and served to house the St. Mary's Boys Orphanage, relocated from Mazant St. in New Orleans; the St. Joseph's Orphan Asylum, relocated from Josephine and Laurel Streets; and the Chinchuba Institute for the Deaf, which had operated in Mandeville, Louisiana, for the previous 40 years.

Wynhoven reported in 1941 that 260 boys were in the orphanage and that 400 more had already successfully completed their training at the institution, becoming "self-supporting, self-respecting, good citizens to American communities." By 1950, over 700 boys trained at Hope Haven had been "helped on the way to a stable and useful life."

From 2018 at least 65 people reported serious sexual and physical abuse they suffered as children at Hope Haven and Madonna Manor from the 1940s to the 1970s.

== Catholic Action of the South ==
Following the U.S. Civil War and up to 1930, The Morning Star was a privately published Catholic newspaper for New Orleans. During the 1920s, Wynhoven was both manager and a columnist of The Morning Star. Two years after its end, Wynhoven started the Catholic Action of the South, an Archdiocese of New Orleans bulletin to be published monthly from a printing press established at Hope Haven for which its boys were trained to operate. Wynhoven served as the editor-in-chief. Within its first year, the publication went from monthly to weekly issues.

The success of the training provided at Hope Haven in the use of the press was evident. In an October 1948 article accompanying the advertisement by The Printing Press, Inc., located on Chartres Street in New Orleans, it was noted that three Hope Haven boys had started their own press in New Orleans. Recognizing the capability of a Hope Haven teen that was already working for the company, The Printing Press wished to hire a graduate of the program because of the quality of their training.

Held in high regard, Wynhoven was named president of the Catholic Press Association, a position he held from 1940 to 1942. He was the first priest to serve in this capacity.

The Catholic Action of the South continued publishing up until February 24, 1963. Archbishop John Cody began making plans for its successor the year prior and on February 28, 1963, the first issue of the Clarion Herald was published. Wynhoven's work in establishing and growing The Catholic Action of the South is credited as laying the foundation for the Clarion Herald, which remains the official newspaper of the Archdiocese of New Orleans to this day.

== Labor board ==
During the Great Depression, a period of rapid growth of labor unions in the U.S., President Franklin Delano Roosevelt appointed Wynhoven as chairman of the New Orleans region of the National Labor Relations Board, one of twelve such regions. The board's purpose was to mediate labor controversies in the area. The day following his appointment in October 1933, hundreds of workers at the Celotex industrial plant in Marrero went on strike. United States Senator Robert F. Wagner, chairman of the National Labor Board, immediately assigned Wynhoven to the task of conciliator. Within days, the dispute was resolved and settled.

== Religion and race relations ==
Wynhoven recognized the surge in religious intolerance leading up to World War II. In reaction, he visited several different states in 1935, accompanied by a former Protestant minister and a Jewish Rabii, speaking to groups about the need for racial and religious tolerance. Wynhoven and his co-speakers concluded and summarized their tour at the Roosevelt Hotel and Elks Lodge No. 30 in New Orleans. He reported speaking to approximately 8,000 people in areas that were former strongholds of the Ku Klux Klan. Of these sessions, Wynhoven commented, "Many came to us after these meetings and said that they had received a new insight into race relations. If this country ever had a handicap it was religious intolerance, and this should be rooted out at every town and city of the country."

== Ecclesiastic rank ==
In 1934, upon the "Silver Jubilee" 25th anniversary of his ordination, Wynhoven was elevated in rank to Domestic Prelate by Pope Pius XI. That same year, he was made pastor of Our Lady of Lourdes Church on Napoleon Avenue in New Orleans, a position that he held for the remainder of his career.

Just prior to his death, Wynhoven was named a Protonotary Apostolic by Pope Pius XII in 1943.

== Death ==
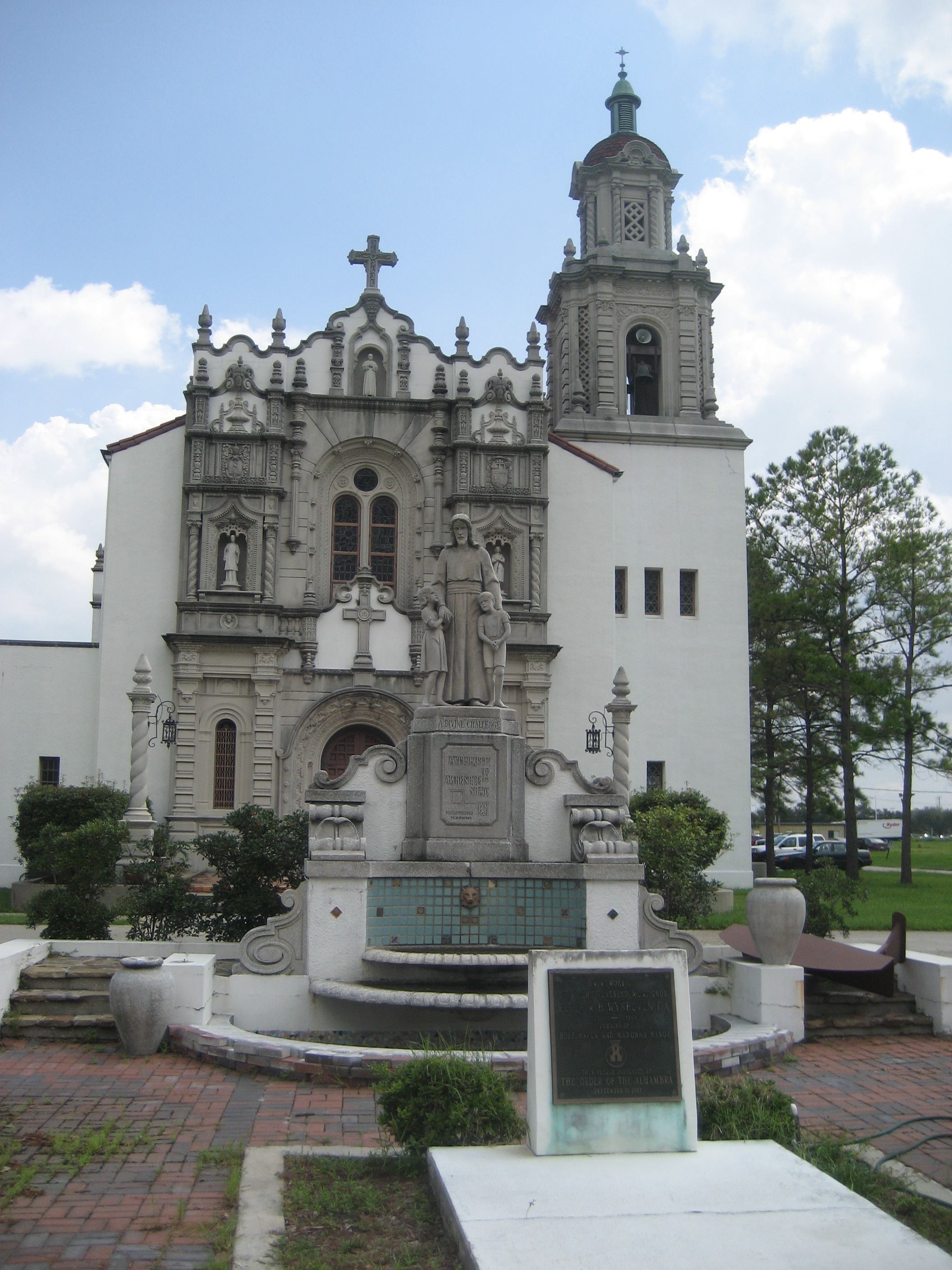
St. Don Bosco Chapel, burial location of Msgr. Peter M.H. Wynhoven

In September 1944, Wynhoven was traveling the country performing missionary work and had just completed services in Missouri before arriving in Nahant, Massachusetts, where he suffered a heart attack and died.

Wynhoven's services were held at Our Lady of Lourdes Church, his post for the previous 10 years, with archbishop Joseph Rummel performing the ceremony. Mass was attended by many high church dignitaries, as well as city and state officials, including New Orleans mayor Robert S. Maestri. Many people attended, with crowds standing at the sides and rear of the church, and overflowing onto the sidewalks outside. Wynhoven was interred on the grounds of St. Don Bosco Chapel at Hope Haven, the institution he founded and to which he devoted much of his life.

His estate included $10,000 in insurance proceeds that were bequeathed to the Roman Catholic Church of the Archdiocese of New Orleans towards the funding of young men preparing for the priesthood at Notre Dame Seminary in New Orleans. He also left $3,000 to his friend, Thomas Jenniskins, in recognition of his aid in "building up Hope Haven." Several pieces of land in his possession were given to the benefit of Hope Haven. Other properties in his native Holland, including his deceased parent's home, were left to St. Antonius Patronaat for charitable work among the youth.

== Posthumous ==
For many years, Wynhoven was honored annually on the third Sunday of September through a Founders Day Celebration, which included a mass at Don Bosco Chapel and visitation to his grave on the Hope Haven property.

In 1962, a $3.0 million loan from the U.S. Federal Government was approved for a 300-unit high-rise tenant building for the elderly to be constructed on a portion of land within the Hope Haven Farm and to be named the "Monsignor Wynhoven Apartments." However, construction did not ensue until 1969. Located at 4600 10th Street in Marrero, Wynhoven Apartments has continuously housed the elderly since its inception.

A chapter of the Catholic men's group, the Knights of Columbus, Wynhoven Council No. 3091, located in Westwego, Louisiana, is named in his honor.

Archbishop Shaw High School, founded in 1962 on the grounds of Hope Haven, has been under the administration of the Salesians of Don Bosco since opening. The Salesians, who taught at Hope Haven since 1933, relinquished their duties there in 1961 to focus on the new all-boys school. Though not directly involved, it can be said that Wynhoven's work contributed greatly to the basis and creation of Archbishop Shaw High School.

== Appointments and honors ==
- 1909: Assistant Pastor, Sacred Heart of Jesus Church, Broussard, LA
- 1910: Assistant Pastor, St. Francis of Assisi, New Orleans, LA
- 1915: Pastor, Our Lady of Sacred Heart Church, New Orleans, LA
- 1916: Chaplain of the Second Louisiana Regiment
- 1917: Pastor, St. Joseph Catholic Church, Gretna, LA
- 1930: Manager/Columnist, "The Morning Star", New Orleans, LA
- 1932: Founder/Editor, "The Catholic Action of the South, New Orleans, LA
- 1933: Chairman of the New Orleans region of the National Labor Relations Board
- 1934: Ecclesiastic Rank "Domestic Prelate"
- 1934: Pastor of the Our Lady of Lourdes Church
- 1940: President of the Catholic Press Association
- 1942: Wage Disputes Arbitor, National Labor Board
- 1943: Ecclesiastic Rank "Protonotary Apostolic"
