= Arthur Jerome Drossaerts =

Dutch-American prelate

His Excellency, The Most Reverend Arthur Jerome Drossaerts
- See: San Antonio
- Appointed: July 18, 1918
- Term ended: September 8, 1940
- Predecessor: John William Shaw
- Successor: Robert Emmet Lucey

Orders
- Ordination: June 15, 1889 by Adrianus Godschalk
- Consecration: December 18, 1918 by Giovanni Bonzano

Personal details
- Born: September 11, 1862 Breda, Kingdom of the Netherlands
- Died: September 8, 1940 (aged 77) San Antonio, Texas, U.S.
- Denomination: Roman Catholic

Styles of Arthur Drossaerts
- Reference style: The Most Reverend
- Spoken style: Your Excellency
- Religious style: Monsignor
- Posthumous style: none

Arthur Jerome Drossaerts (September 11, 1862 – September 8, 1940) was a Dutch-born prelate of the Roman Catholic Church. He served as bishop and archbishop of San Antonio in Texas from 1918 until his death in 1940.

== Biography ==
=== Early life ===
Arthur Drossaerts was born on September 11, 1862, in Breda in the Netherlands to Cornelius and Sophie (née de Fraiture) Drossaerts. Deciding to become a priest, he studied at several seminaries in the Netherlands.

=== Priesthood ===
Drossaerts was ordained to the priesthood by Bishop Adrianus Godschalk on June 15, 1889. He then traveled to the United States at the request of Archbishop Francis Janssens, who assigned Drossaerts to pastoral work in Lake Charles, Louisiana. He initiated the religious education of African-American Catholics, and also served as a pastor in New Orleans, Broussard, and Baton Rouge.

=== Bishop and Archbishop of San Antonio ===
On July 18, 1918, Drossaerts was appointed the fifth bishop of San Antonio by Pope Benedict XV. He received his episcopal consecration on December 18, 1918, from Archbishop Giovanni Bonzano, with Bishops Theophile Meerschaert and John Marius Laval serving as co-consecrators, in St. Louis Cathedral. Drossaerts was later made an archbishop upon San Antonio's elevation to the rank of an archdiocese on August 3, 1926.

Throughout his tenure in San Antonio, he provided refuge to numerous clergymen who fled from persecution during the Mexican Revolution, raising over $21,000 for this cause in 1926–1929.

At the funeral Mass for the late Bishop of Aguascalientes, Drossaerts condemned the perceived lack of American interest in the Church's persecution in Mexico, saying, "Liberty is being crucified at our very door, and the United States looks on with perfect indifference. Despotism seems to have become popular amongst us. Are we not sending endless goodwill parties to Mexico? Are we not courting the friendship and favor of the very men whose hands are simply dripping with the blood of their innocent victims? ... The ominous silence of the American press and pulpit is not understandable."

Pope Pius XI made him an assistant at the pontifical throne on August 19, 1934.

Drossaerts also denounced the women's fashions of his time, which he described as "formerly the exclusive badge of the scarlet woman", lamenting the "degrading spectacle of young women being exhibited and appraised like dogs and cattle."

=== Death ===
Drossaerts died at Santa Rosa Hospital in San Antonio on September 8, 1940, three days before his 78th birthday. He was buried at San Fernando Archdiocesan Cemetery in San Antonio.

Catholic Church titles
Preceded by John William Shaw	Bishop of San Antonio; 1918–1926	Succeeded by San Antonio Diocese elevated to Archdiocese
Preceded by None	Archbishop of San Antonio; 1926–1940	Succeeded by Robert Emmet Lucey
