= Placide Louis Chapelle =

French-born American prelate

The Most Reverend Placide Louis Chapelle
- Archbishop of New Orleans; Archbishop of Santa Fe
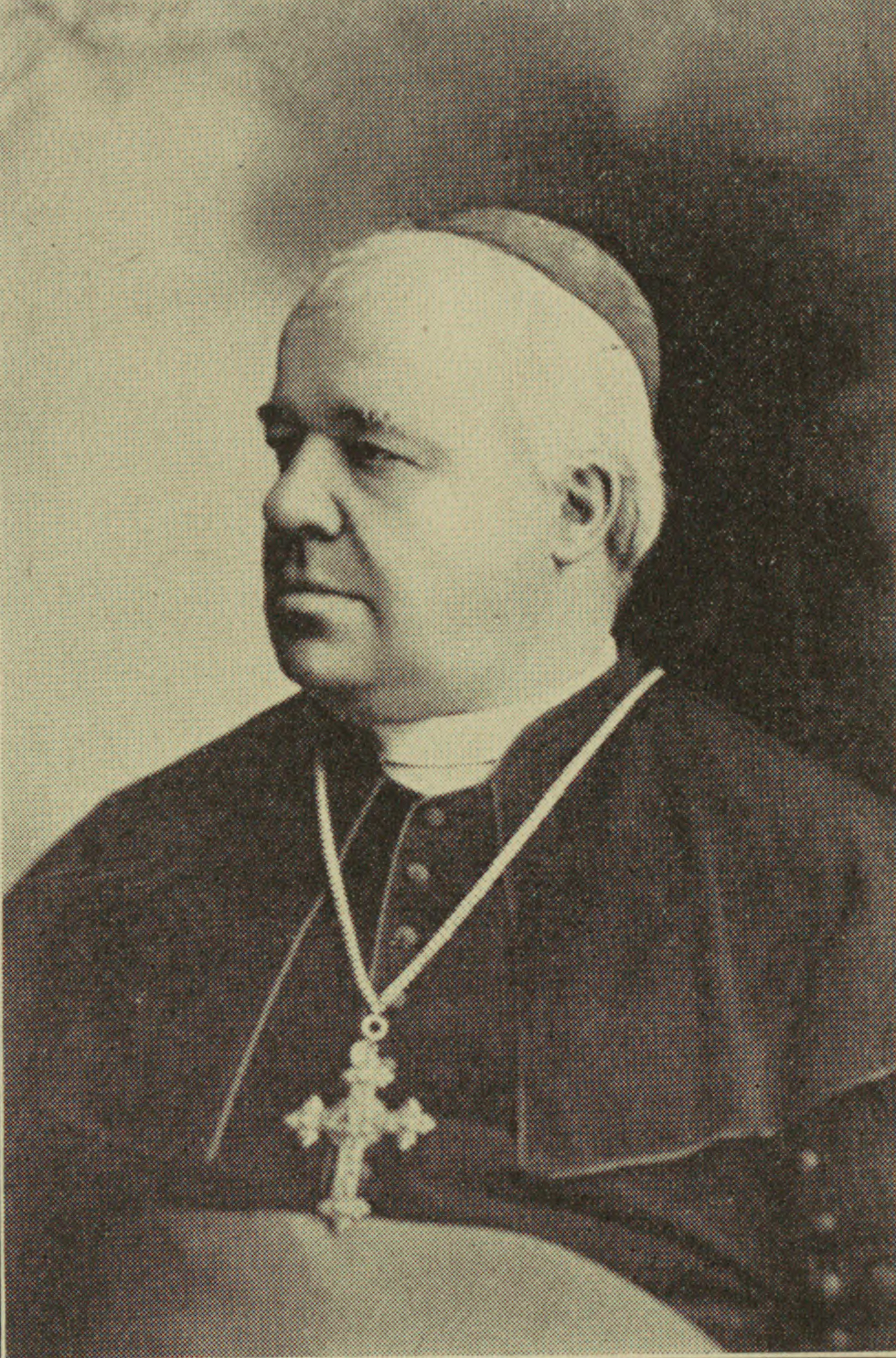
- Chapelle, c. 1903
- See: Archdiocese of New Orleans
- Appointed: December 1, 1897
- Term ended: August 9, 1905 (his death)
- Predecessor: Francis Janssens
- Successor: James Blenk
- Other posts: Apostolic Delegate to Cuba (1898–1905); Apostolic Delegate to Puerto Rico (1898–1905); Apostolic Delegate to the Philippines (1899–1901); Archbishop of Santa Fe (1894–1897); Coadjutor Archbishop of Santa Fe (1891–1894)

Orders
- Ordination: June 28, 1865 by Martin John Spalding
- Consecration: November 1, 1891 by James Gibbons

Personal details
- Born: August 28, 1842 Fraissinet-de-Lozère, Lozère, France
- Died: August 9, 1905 (aged 62) New Orleans, Louisiana, U.S.
- Coat of arms

Placide Louis Chapelle (August 28, 1842 – August 9, 1905) was a French-born American prelate of the Catholic Church. He served as Archbishop of Santa Fe (1894–1897) and later Archbishop of New Orleans (1897–1905). Following the Spanish–American War, he also served as Apostolic Delegate to Cuba, Puerto Rico, and the Philippines.

== Early life and education ==
Chapelle was born in Fraissinet-de-Lozère to Jean Pierre and Sophia (née Viala) Chapelle. His mother died in childbirth in 1847, when Chapelle was five years old. He received his early education in Mende and completed his classical studies at Collège Saint-Augustin in Enghien, Belgium.

At age 17, he was brought to the United States by his uncle Jean Chapelle, a missionary priest in Haiti who worked on the Vatican's concordat with the Haitian government and was on the eve of being appointed Archbishop of Port-au-Prince before his death in 1861. He studied for the priesthood at St. Mary's Seminary in Baltimore, graduating in 1863. At that point he was still too young to be ordained and therefore taught at St. Charles College for two years.

== Priesthood ==
Chapelle was ordained a priest on June 28, 1865, by Archbishop Martin John Spalding. His first assignment was as pastor of St. Mary's Church in Rockville, which included several missions throughout Montgomery County. One of his assistant pastors was Jeremiah O'Sullivan, later Bishop of Mobile (1885–1896). While there he furthered his studies at St. Mary's Seminary and earned a doctorate in theology in 1868. His educational pursuits led his parishioners in Rockville to petition Archbishop Spalding for a new pastor, complaining that Chapelle was "invisible during the week and incomprehensible on Sundays."

Archbishop Spalding took a great interest in Chapelle and brought him to the First Vatican Council (1869–1870) as a theological consultant. After returning from Rome, he served as assistant pastor of St. John's Church in Baltimore before becoming pastor of St. Joseph's Church in the same city in 1871. The following year, in addition to his pastoral duties, he was appointed president of the theological conferences in Baltimore, which were held every three months.

Chapelle was sent to Washington, D.C. in 1882 to serve as pastor of St. Matthew's Church, where he remained until he became a bishop in 1891. St. Matthew's was considered a prestigious post, as it was the place of worship for many government officials and foreign diplomats. He was instrumental in organizing the Catholic University of America, purchasing the land where it still stands and recruiting President Grover Cleveland to attend the laying of the cornerstone in 1888. He also served as vice president of the Bureau of Catholic Indian Missions (1886–1891).

In 1885, Cardinal Giovanni Simeoni, the head of the Congregation for the Propagation of the Faith, assigned Cardinal James Gibbons of Baltimore to investigate the administrative disorders of the Archdiocese of New Orleans, which had fallen into considerable debt. Gibbons chose Chapelle as his secretary for the investigation, and Archbishop Francis Xavier Leray was so impressed with Chapelle that he requested to have him for a coadjutor bishop. However, after Leray died in 1887, he was instead replaced by Francis Janssens.

== Archbishop of Santa Fe ==
On August 21, 1891, Chapelle was appointed by Pope Leo XIII to be Coadjutor Archbishop with the right of succession to Jean-Baptiste Salpointe, the aging Archbishop of Santa Fe. He was also given the title of titular bishop of Arabissus. He received his episcopal consecration on the following November 1 from Cardinal James Gibbons, with Archbishop Salpointe and Bishop John Joseph Kain serving as co-consecrators, at the Cathedral of Baltimore. A year later, in November 1892, Chapelle became a naturalized U.S. citizen.

Upon Salpointe's retirement on January 7, 1894, Chapelle succeeded him as the third Archbishop of Santa Fe. That same year he persuaded Saint Katharine Drexel to reopen St. Catherine's Indian School, a boarding school for Native American children in Santa Fe, under the control of the Sisters of the Blessed Sacrament. He consecrated the then-unfinished Cathedral of St. Francis of Assisi in October 1895. He confirmed approximately 40,000 people during his six years in New Mexico.

In civic affairs, Chapelle was an early supporter of the cause for New Mexico's statehood (which would be accomplished in 1912), saying in 1894, "As it is, we have no voice in the election of governor, judges or any other officials of importance, and we think we have a right to this."

== Archbishop of New Orleans ==
Francis Janssens, who had been chosen over Chapelle to lead the Archdiocese of New Orleans a decade earlier, died in June 1897. Fifteen days after Janssens' death, Chapelle had an audience with Pope Leo XIII, who made it clear that he intended to appoint Chapelle to the post. The priests of New Orleans also put forward Chapelle's name as their top choice for a new archbishop. However, the local bishops of the province instead suggested the Belgian-born Bishop Camillus Paul Maes or the Irish-born Bishops Thomas Heslin and John J. Keane. The New Orleans clergy were determined to have a French leader for the largely French-speaking archdiocese, and enlisted French President Félix Faure to lobby on Chapelle's behalf to Rome. Chapelle was officially appointed the sixth Archbishop of New Orleans on December 1, 1897.

Over the course of his tenure, he succeeded in finally paying off the debt that had long plagued the Archdiocese of New Orleans, which had fallen from $590,000 when he visited with Cardinal Gibbons in 1885 to $135,000 when he assumed charge in 1898. The debt was erased by the end of 1903, but not without complaint from his priests about the new tax he imposed on them. Chapelle also reopened the diocesan seminary, which had closed due to financial pressure in 1881.

However, most of Chapelle's time as archbishop was focused on his diplomatic missions. Due to his prolonged absences from New Orleans, he received Gustave Augustin Rouxel as an auxiliary bishop in February 1899 to tend to the archdiocese's pastoral needs.

== Vatican diplomat ==
=== Cuba and Puerto Rico ===
Following the American victory in the Spanish–American War, and less than a year after his appointment to New Orleans, Chapelle was named Apostolic Delegate to Cuba on September 16, 1898, and Apostolic Delegate to Puerto Rico on the following October 11. In these roles, he was commissioned by the Vatican to participate in the negotiations of the 1898 Treaty of Paris. Under the treaty, which was signed on December 10 that year, Spain ceded the heavily Catholic colonies of Cuba, Puerto Rico, and the Philippines to the United States. Chapelle was credited with the clause in Article 8 guaranteeing the Church's right to keep its properties in those territories.

Chapelle visited Cuba and Puerto Rico in early 1899 to report on the Church's conditions there and suggest a plan for reorganization. In July of that year, he consecrated the two bishops he had recommended to the Vatican: Francisco de Paula Barnada y Aguilar as Archbishop of Santiago and James Blenk (who would succeed him as Archbishop of New Orleans) as Bishop of Puerto Rico.

=== Philippines ===
Given Chapelle's success in Cuba and Puerto Rico, another former Spanish colony was soon added to his diplomatic portfolio. In addition to his duties in New Orleans, Cuba, and Puerto Rico, he was appointed Apostolic Delegate to Philippines on September 28, 1899. His mission in the Philippines was particularly difficult due to the Philippine–American War, focusing primarily on the displacement of Spanish friars in the Philippines.

The Spanish friars had owned 400,000 acres of land that were leased to Filipino peasants under prohibitive rents. When the Treaty of Paris rejected the Philippine Declaration of Independence and annexed the Philippines to the United States, it also protected the property rights of the Church (and therefore the friars) — thanks in part to Chapelle's contributions. This helped fuel the Philippine Revolution, during which the friars were driven from their churches and their property was confiscated by Emilio Aguinaldo and his fellow revolutionaries.

Upon arriving in Manila in January 1900, Chapelle sought to restore the friars to their former positions under American protection. However, he met resistance from General Elwell Stephen Otis, the military governor of the Philippines, who believed that reinstating the friars would get them killed and usually turned any recovered Church property over to local civil authorities. Chapelle protested this policy, accusing General Otis' advisers of being "animated with a narrow-minded spirit of hostility to the Catholic Church, whilst they should look at the question presented to them from a disinterested and American point of view."

Nor did Chapelle find an ally in the civilian governor (and future U.S. president), William Howard Taft, who wrote to Maria Longworth Storer to say, "Archbishop Chapelle has become absolutely identified with the Friars...I do not think it was necessary for him to get into this position, but that is where he is, and while, of course, his sacerdotal office compels respect, politically he has no force whatever." Chapelle's refusal to compromise on the issue of the friars' land cost him a good deal of political influence. Writing to Cardinal Gibbons in August 1901, Archbishop John Ireland said, "From the general tone of Cardinal Rampolla's letters, I can see that Abp. Chapelle does not count for much. At any rate, the American government will be much displeased, as Mr. Root said to me, to see [Chapelle] return to Manila." Before departing his post, Chapelle wrote to Taft to declare the commission "has taken, unconsciously perhaps, indirectly surely, a hostile attitude towards the Catholic Church and her interests."

Chapelle's actions were seen as worsening relations between the Church and the Filipinos, and his mission was regarded by many as a failure. However, he had support from figures like Cardinal Lucido Parocchi, who described Chapelle as "an angel of Providence to the Philippines." Nevertheless, after Chapelle departed for Rome in April 1901 to report on his mission, he was relieved of his duties in the Philippines and was replaced by Donato Sbarretti. Meanwhile, he retained his positions as Archbishop of New Orleans and Apostolic Delegate to Cuba and Puerto Rico.

== Later life and death ==
During the summer of 1905, Chapelle contracted yellow fever after completing his first confirmation tour around the archdiocese since his appointment to New Orleans. He died on August 9, 1905, at age 62. He is buried at St. Louis Cathedral.

Following his death, President Theodore Roosevelt sent the following telegram to Cardinal Gibbons: "I am deeply shocked and grieved at the death of my beloved friend, Archbishop Chapelle. His death is one of the most lamentable losses in the course of the outbreak of fever in New Orleans, which is causing much sympathy and concern throughout the nation."

Catholic Church titles
Preceded by Jean-Baptiste Salpointe	Archbishop of Santa Fe; 1894–1897	Succeeded by Peter Bourgade
Preceded by Francis Janssens	Archbishop of New Orleans; 1897–1905	Succeeded by James Blenk, S.M.
Preceded by Creation of Delegation	Apostolic Delegate to the Philippines; 1900–1901	Succeeded by Donato Sbarretti
