= Archbishop Rummel =

Archbishop Rummel may refer to:

- Joseph Rummel (1876–1964), Roman Catholic archbishop
- Archbishop Rummel High School, Roman Catholic secondary school Metairie, Louisiana
