= Francisco Porró y Reinado =

Spanish Catholic prelate (1739-1814)

The Right Reverend Francisco Porró y Reinado
- Bishop of Tarazona
- Church: Catholic
- Diocese: Tarazona
- Appointed: 20 July 1801

Orders
- Consecration: 15 November 1801 by Francisco Antonio Cardinal de Lorenzana y Butrón

Personal details
- Born: 15 October 1739
- Died: 3 January 1814 (aged 74)

Francisco Bartolomé Porró y Reinado, C.R.M. (15 October 1739 – 3 January 1814) was a Spanish Catholic prelate who served as Bishop of Louisiana and the Two Floridas (1801–1803) and as Bishop of Tarazona (1803–1814).

== Biography ==
Born in Gibraltar, Porró was a Franciscan of the Convent of the Holy Apostles in Rome. He was appointed Bishop of Louisiana and the Two Floridas in the (former) Spanish Louisiana (returned French after the Third Treaty of San Ildefonso) on 20 July 1801 and received his episcopal consecration on the following 15 November from Cardinal Francisco Antonio de Lorenzana. However, he never took possession of the diocese; some say that he was never consecrated, he died before departing from Rome, or he never left because of a rumored sale of Louisiana to the United States.

On 17 January 1803 Porro was transferred to the See of Terrazona in Spain. He died in the position at age 74.

Catholic Church titles
Preceded by Luis Ignatius Peñalver y Cárdenas	Bishop of Louisiana and the Two Floridas; 1801-1803	Succeeded by Louis William Valentine Dubourg
Preceded by Damián Martínez de Galinsonga	Bishop of Terrazona; 1803-1814	Succeeded by Jerónimo Castellón y Salas
