= Le Propagateur Catholique =

Le Propagateur Catholique ("The Catholic Propagator") was a 19th-century American, French-language, Roman Catholic newspaper. It was founded in 1842 at the newspaper of the Archdiocese of New Orleans by Archbishop Napoléon-Joseph Perché. The first editor was Adrien Rouquette. Le Propagateur was published until 1888.
