= Archbishop Shaw =

Archbishop Shaw may refer to:

- John Shaw (archbishop) (1863–1934), a Roman Catholic archbishop
- Archbishop Shaw High School, a high school in Marrero, Louisiana
