= Caillouet =

Caillouet is a surname. Notable people with the surname include:

- Adrian Joseph Caillouet (1883–1946), United States federal judge
- Louis Abel Caillouet (1900–1984), Catholic bishop in the United States
