= Adrien Rouquette =

Louisiana Creole writer, poet and missionary

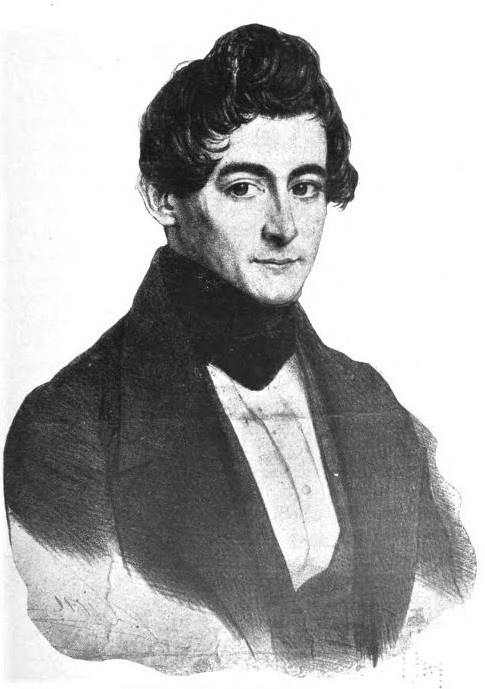
Adrien Rouquette

Adrien Rouquette (February 26, 1813–July 15, 1887) was a Louisiana Creole writer, poet, and Catholic priest who served as a missionary to the Choctaw Native Americans, among whom he was also known as Chahta-Ima (Choctaw: "Like a Choctaw").

== Biography ==
Adrien Emmanuel Rouquette was born February 26, 1813, in New Orleans, Louisiana, the third of five surviving children. His father, Dominique, had emigrated to New Orleans from Fleurance, France, in 1800, where he soon married a Creole woman named Louise Cousin. By marriage, the Rouquette family was then connected not only to the Cousin family but also the Carrière family, two of the biggest landowning families in Louisiana. Dominique fought under the command of General Andrew Jackson during the Battle of New Orleans and, four years later, committed suicide by drowning in the Mississippi River.

Following his father's suicide, Rouquette moved with his family to the Bayou St. John area, just outside New Orleans. Here in his youth, he became interested in the Choctaws who lived on the north shore of Lake Pontchartrain. He later recalled, with much hyperbole, that by 1820 "there were more Indians in the city than there were whites or negroes". He and his siblings would play games together and, as Rouquette's older brother later recalled, it was a "golden age of life", and referred fondly to the "free and happy years of my half savage childhood".

Rouquette was sent as a young man to study at Transylvania University in Kentucky; while there, he heard of his mother's death. In 1829 he was sent to France and finished his collegiate studies in Paris, Nantes, and Rennes, earning his baccalaureate in 1833. He returned to New Orleans, and spent much time alone or among his Choctaw friends. Later he returned to Paris to study law, but preferred literature, and returned to Louisiana. In 1842 he made a third visit to France, where he published his first poetic essay, Les Savannes, which was well received. Between 1829 and 1846, Rouquette made five separate trips from New Orleans to France.

The writings of the Rouquette family were soon well-known both in Louisiana and in France; in addition to Adrien's writings, his older brother François-Dominique published a book of poetry, as did his younger brother Térence. In Louisiana, Rouquette soon became editor of Le Propagateur Catholique. Before long he was ordained as a Catholic priest. Assigned to duty at the St. Louis Cathedral in New Orleans, he served for fourteen years as a priest in the city, then suddenly, in 1859, he severed all connection to it.

He then made his home for twenty-nine years as a missionary with the Choctaws. He anticipated that other enlightened Christians would join him to escape modern commercialism but, failing that, he established a mission community among the several thousand Choctaws then living in the forests beside Lake Pontchartrain. He eventually built five cabin chapels to sleep in, write, and conduct Mass. By 1859, he was accepted as an honorary member and granted the name Chahta-Ima, meaning "Like a Choctaw", which he began to use in his professional life. He lived among the tribe on the banks of Bayou Lacombe until his death in 1887.

Special Collections & Archives at Loyola University New Orleans preserves a small collection of writings by Rouquette and his brother, author and poet François Dominique.

== Publications ==
- Les Savanes, Poesies Americanines (1841)
- Discours Prononce a la Cathedrales de Saint-Louis (1846)
- Wild Flowers: Sacred Poetry (1848)
- La Thébaïde en Amérique, ou Apologie de la vie Solitaire et Contemplative (1852)
- L'Antoniade, ou la solitude avec Dieu (1860)
- Le Vingt-cinquieme Anniversaire du Pontificat de Pio Nono, 17 Juin, 1871(1871)
- Catherine Tehgahkwitha, The Saint of Caughnawaga (1873)
- La Nouvelle Atala, ou La Fille de L'esprit, Légende Indienne (1879)
- Critical Dialogue between Aboo and Caboo on a New Book or a Grandissime Ascension (1880)
