= Joseph Rummel =

American Catholic prelate and civil rights activist (1876–1964)

His Excellency, The Most Reverend Joseph Francis Rummel
- Archbishop of New Orleans
- Portrait of Rummel
- Province: New Orleans
- See: Archdiocese of New Orleans
- Installed: March 9, 1935
- Term ended: November 8, 1964
- Predecessor: John William Shaw
- Successor: John Patrick Cody
- Other post: Bishop of Omaha (1928 – 1935)

Orders
- Ordination: May 24, 1902
- Consecration: May 29, 1928 by Patrick Joseph Hayes

Personal details
- Born: October 14, 1876 Steinmauern, Grand Duchy of Baden, German Empire (now Germany)
- Died: November 8, 1964 (aged 88) New Orleans, Louisiana, U.S.
- Buried: Cathedral Basilica of Saint Louis
- Education: St. Boniface Parochial School; Saint Anselm College
- Motto: Animam pro ovibus ponere (To give one's life for the sheep)

Ordination history of Joseph Rummel
History
Episcopal consecration
- Consecrated by: Patrick Joseph Hayes (New York)
- Date: May 29, 1928
Episcopal succession
Bishops consecrated by Joseph Rummel as principal consecrator
- Charles Pasquale Greco: February 25, 1946
- Louis Abel Caillouet: October 28, 1947

Joseph Francis Rummel (October 14, 1876 – November 8, 1964) was a German-born American Catholic prelate of the Roman Catholic Church. He served as bishop of the Diocese of Omaha in Nebraska from 1928 to 1935 and as archbishop of the Archdiocese of New Orleans in Louisiana from 1935 to 1964.

A staunch advocate for racial equality, Rummel received national attention for excommunicating several people who vocally opposed racial desegregation of parochial schools in the archdiocese.

== Early life ==
Joseph Francis Rummel was born in the village of Steinmauern in the Grand Duchy of Baden, German Empire (present-day Germany), on October 14, 1876. His family immigrated to the United States when he was six-years-old. Like many recent German immigrants, the Rummels settled in the Yorkville District of Manhattan in New York City.

Rummel attended St. Boniface Parochial School, then went to St. Mary's College, a Redemptorist minor seminary in North East, Pennsylvania. He graduated from Saint Anselm College in Goffstown, New Hampshire in 1889. Rummel was then sent to study in Rome.

== Priesthood ==
Rummel was ordained to the priesthood for the Archdiocese of New York at the Basilica of St. John Lateran in Rome by Cardinal Pietro Respighi on May 24, 1902. Rummel returned to New York City and served as a parish priest in several parishes for the next 25 years.

== Bishop of Omaha ==
Rummel was named the fourth bishop of Omaha by Pope Pius XI on March 30, 1928. He was consecrated on May 29, 1928, at St. Patrick's Cathedral in New York City by Cardinal Patrick Hayes.

== Archbishop of New Orleans ==
Rummel was named by Pius XI as the ninth archbishop of New Orleans on March 9, 1935. He succeeded Archbishop John Shaw. Rummel became archbishop during the Great Depression of the 1930s. At the time, New Orleans was rapidly urbanizing as farmers flocked to the city in search of factory jobs. Also, recent European immigrants, many of whom were Catholic, were also settling in the city. Over the next thirty years, the Catholic population in the archdiocese would double to over 762,000, and the number of students in Catholic schools grew from fewer than 40,000 to over 85,000.

During Rummel's episcopacy, 45 new church parishes were created throughout the archdiocese, increasing the number of parishes from 135 to 180. In 1945 he launched the Youth Progress Program, a major initiative to raise money for the expansion of the parochial school system. This program resulted in the construction of 70 new Catholic schools, including several new high schools.

In 1935, Rummel mandated the creation of CCD programs in every parish. He streamlined the accounting procedures of the archdiocese. He also created new lay organizations to support an expansion of the many charity programs within the archdiocese.

=== Desegregation ===
Rummel spent most of his tenure in New Orleans expanding the parochial school system. However, he is perhaps best remembered for his controversial decision to desegregate the archdiocese, including the Catholic schools. All of the Southern states, including Louisiana and the city of New Orleans, had been racially segregated by law since the Reconstruction Era ended in the 1870s. Like the rest of the city, parishes and schools within the archdiocese were also segregated. The community had accepted segregation as a normal part of life.

The city of New Orleans has always had a large population of black Catholics. Previous archbishops, such as Francis Janssens and James Blenk, established dedicated schools for black children in an attempt to improve the educational opportunities for black parishioners. But the segregated parochial school system suffered from the same problems with underfunding and low standards as the segregated public school system. No archbishop attempted to desegregate the archdiocese until the American Civil Rights Movement began after the end of the Second World War.

Once the movement began, Rummel embraced the cause of racial equality. He admitted two black students to the Notre Dame Seminary in 1948. He ordered the removal of "white" and "colored" signs from churches in 1951. That year he opened Saint Augustine High School, run by the Josephites as the first high school dedicated to the higher education of young black men in the history of the archdiocese.

In 1953, Rummel issued "Blessed Are the Peacemakers", the pastoral letter that officially ordered the end to racial segregation in the entire archdiocese:

"Ever mindful, therefore, of the basic truth that our Colored Catholic brethren share with us the same spiritual life and destiny, the same membership in the Mystical Body of Christ, the same dependence upon the Word of God, the participation in the Sacraments, especially the Most Holy Eucharist, the same need of moral and social encouragement,

let there be no further discrimination or segregation in the pews, at the Communion rail, at the confessional and in parish meetings, just as there will be no segregation in the kingdom of heaven."
("Blessed Are the Peacemakers." Pastoral letter 15. 1953.)

The letter was read in every church in every parish of the archdiocese. Some parishioners organized protests against the diocesan order. Rummel closed a church in Jesuit Bend in 1955 when its members began protesting the assignment of a black priest to their parish. He issued another pastoral letter the following year, reiterating the incompatibility of segregation with the doctrines of the Catholic Church.

"Racial segregation as such is morally wrong and sinful because it is a denial of the unity and solidarity of the human race as conceived by God in the creation of Adam and Eve."
("The Morality of Racial Segregation." Pastoral letter. Feb. 1956.)

Most parishioners reluctantly accepted the desegregation of parishes, but school desegregation was a very different matter. The United States Supreme Court issued its Brown v. Topeka Board of Education decision on May 17, 1954, declaring segregated schools unconstitutional and reversing all state laws that had established them.

We conclude that, in the field of public education, the doctrine of "separate but equal" has no place. Separate educational facilities are inherently unequal. (Earl Warren, Chief Justice of the United States Supreme Court. May 17, 1954.)

The Louisiana State Legislature promptly passed Act 555 and Act 556, protecting its segregated public school system from being dismantled by the Supreme Court. Both acts were rendered unconstitutional by Judge J. Skelly Wright, a federal judge from the U.S. District Court for the Eastern District of Louisiana in New Orleans, in the case Earl Benjamin Bush v. Orleans Parish School Board in February 1956. Nevertheless, the Orleans Parish School Board and neighboring parish school boards vowed to postpone desegregating their public schools indefinitely.

Rummel praised Brown v. Board of Education, but he was reluctant to desegregate his own parochial school system. He had announced his intention to desegregate the Catholic schools as early as 1956. However, most archdiocesan parish school boards had voted against desegregation. After Bush v. Parish School Board, some parents had transferred their students from public schools to parochial schools to avoid desegregation. A few local Catholics sent a petition to Pope Pius XII, requesting a papal decree supporting segregation. The pope responded by describing racism as a major evil.

There was also a very real threat that the State Legislature would withhold funding from parochial schools if they desegregated. The State of Louisiana funded free textbooks, reduced-price lunches, and free buses for all students in the state, even students attending parochial schools. This was a legacy of Louisiana Governor Huey Long's Share Our Wealth program.

But by 1962, Judge Wright had issued a barrage of court orders neutralizing the Orleans Parish School Board's attempts at evading the Supreme Court. A handful of black students were already being admitted into previously all-white public schools. Rummel formally announced the end of segregation in the New Orleans parochial school system on March 27, 1962. The 1962–1963 school year would be the first integrated school year in the history of the archdiocese.

White segregationists were outraged. Politicians organized "Citizens' Councils", held public protests, and initiated letter writing campaigns. Parents threatened to transfer their children to public schools or even boycott the entire school year. Rummel issued numerous letters to individual Catholics, pleading for their cooperation and explaining his decision. He even went so far as to threaten opponents of desegregation with excommunication, the most severe censure of the Church. The threats were enough to convince most segregationist Catholics into standing down. Nevertheless, some parishioners continued to organize protests.

On April 16, 1962, the Monday before Easter, Rummel excommunicated three local Catholics for defying the authority of the Church and organizing protests against the archdiocese.The first of the three was Judge Leander Perez, a parish judge from Plaquemines Parish, who called on Catholics to withhold donations to the archdiocese and to boycott Sunday church collections. The second was Jackson G. Ricau, a political commentator, segregationist writer, and director of the "Citizens Council of South Louisiana". The third was Una Gaillot, a mother of two, housewife, and president of "Save Our Nation Inc."The excommunications made national headlines and had the tacit support of Pope John XXIII. Perez and Ricau were reinstated into the Catholic Church after they made public retractions.

A few months later, the 1963 school year began in September 1962. A handful of black students were admitted to previously all-white Catholic schools. Earlier threats of boycotts and mass student transfers to public schools never materialized. No violence took place between whites and the black students. Parents and students grudgingly surrendered to Rummel's decision, and racial segregation in the archdiocese quietly faded from memory.

=== Second Vatican Council, failing health and later life ===
By October 1962, Rummel was eighty-six years old, in declining health, and almost completely blind from glaucoma. Nevertheless, he left New Orleans for Vatican City to attend the first session of the Second Vatican Council.

In October 1960, at age 83, Rummel broke an arm and a leg in a fall, after which he nearly died from pneumonia. Rummel recovered and continued to serve as archbishop for another four years, but his health was a recurring concern. The Vatican assigned him a coadjutor archbishop, John Cody, in 1961, to assist with administering the archdiocese. The archdiocese opened four high schools in 1962:

- Archbishop Shaw in Marrero Louisiana
- Archbishop Chapelle in Metairie, Louisiana
- Archbishop Blenk in Gretna, Louisiana (merged with Immaculata in 2005 to form Academy of Our Lady)
- Archbishop Rummel in Metairie

== Death and legacy ==
Rummel died in New Orleans on November 8, 1964, at the age of 88. He was succeeded by Cody, his coadjutor archbishop, who was appointed Archbishop of Chicago by Pope Paul VI less than one year later. Rummel is interred under the sanctuary at Saint Louis Cathedral in the French Quarter. Archbishop Rummel High School in Metairie is named after him.

== Sources ==
- Nolan, Charles E. A History of the Archdiocese of New Orleans. "World War II and the Post-War Years 1941-1965". May 2001.
- Smestad, John Jr. Loyola University, New Orleans. The Role of Archbishop Joseph F. Rummel in the Desegregation of Catholic Schools in New Orleans. 1994.

Catholic Church titles
Preceded by John Shaw	Archbishop of New Orleans; 1935–1964	Succeeded by John Cody
Preceded by Jeremiah James Harty	Bishop of Omaha; 1928–1935	Succeeded by Archbishop James Hugh Ryan
