= Jesuit Bend, Louisiana =

Jesuit Bend
- Unincorporated community
- Location of Jesuit Bend in Louisiana
- Coordinates: 29°44′54″N 90°01′33″W
- Country: United States
- State: Louisiana
- Parish: Plaquemines
- Elevation: 3 ft (0.91 m)
- Time zone: UTC-6 (CST)
  - Summer (DST): UTC-5 (CDT)
- Area code: 504

Jesuit Bend is an unincorporated community in Plaquemines Parish, Louisiana, United States, on the West Bank of the Mississippi River.

== History ==
Members of the Society of Jesus settled at this location in the early part of the 18th century, a bend in the Mississippi River, hence the name "Jesuit Bend". The Jesuit settlers brought with them from Asia the satsuma, a loosely skinned seedless tangerine. Satsumas have been farmed at this locale ever since.

At one point, Jesuit Bend had a station on the New Orleans, Fort Jackson & Grand Isle Railroad line. It also is the location of the Jesuit Bend Wetland Mitigation Bank, an effort to return open water to a fully functioning freshwater marsh, to help reverse the longstanding problem of wetlands erosion in the Mississippi River Delta. Companies can purchase credits from the restoration project to compensate for construction projects that destroy wetlands.

=== Jesuit Bend Incident ===
In October 1955, parishioners at St. Cecilia Catholic Mission in Jesuit Bend stopped Fr Gerald Lewis, an Afro-Panamanian priest of the Society of the Divine Word, from celebrating Mass because of his skin color. The Archbishop of New Orleans, Joseph Rummel, then placed the chapel under interdict. This lasted for 18 months before Fr Peter Oswald, SVD, the assistant pastor of the mission's mother church, obtained signatures from a number of parishioners promising to accept any priest sent to them. However, Oswald reportedly promised parishioners that the Divine Word Society would never again send a Black priest to St. Cecilia's. Rummel approved the chapel's reopening in April 1958 before eventually discovering the ruse, but he wished to save face and not renege on the order. The chapel was destroyed by a hurricane soon after and, on Rummel's orders, was never rebuilt.
