= John Laval =

American bishop (1854-1937)

Most Reverend John M. Laval
- Auxiliary Bishop of New Orleans
- Church: Catholic Church
- See: Titular See of Hierocaesarea
- Appointed: September 7, 1911
- In office: November 29, 1911 - June 4, 1937

Orders
- Ordination: November 10, 1877
- Consecration: November 29, 1911 by James Blenk

Personal details
- Born: September 21, 1854 Saint-Étienne, Loire, France
- Died: June 4, 1937 (aged 82) New Orleans, Louisiana, US

John Laval (September 21, 1854 – June 4, 1937) was an American bishop of the Catholic Church. He served as auxiliary bishop of the Archdiocese of New Orleans from 1911 to 1937.

== Biography ==
Born in Saint-Étienne, Loire, France, Laval was ordained a priest for the Archdiocese of New Orleans on November 10, 1877. On September 7, 1911 Pope Pius X appointed him as the Titular Bishop of Hierocaesarea and Auxiliary Bishop of New Orleans. He was consecrated a bishop by Archbishop James Blenk, S.M. on November 29, 1911. The principal co-consecrators were Bishops Cornelius Van de Ven of Alexandria in Louisiana and John Shaw of San Antonio. He continued to serve as an auxiliary bishop until his death on June 4, 1937, at the age of 82. He is buried in the Cathedral-Basilica of Saint Louis King of France in New Orleans.

Catholic Church titles
Preceded by –	Auxiliary Bishop of New Orleans; 1911–1937	Succeeded by –
