= Dominic Carmon =

American Roman Catholic prelate (1930–2018)

His Excellency, The Most Reverend Dominic Carmon SVD
- Auxiliary Bishop Emeritus of New Orleans; Titular Bishop of Rusicade
- Archdiocese: New Orleans
- Appointed: December 16, 1992
- Installed: February 11, 1993
- Term ended: December 13, 2006
- Other post: Titular Bishop of Rusicade

Orders
- Ordination: February 2, 1960
- Consecration: February 11, 1993 by Francis B. Schulte, Wilton Daniel Gregory, and Harry Joseph Flynn

Personal details
- Born: December 13, 1930 Opelousas, Louisiana
- Died: November 11, 2018 (aged 87)

Styles of Dominic Carmon
- Reference style: His Excellency; The Most Reverend
- Spoken style: Your Excellency
- Religious style: Bishop

Dominic Carmon, S.V.D. (December 13, 1930 – November 11, 2018) was an American Catholic prelate who served as an auxiliary bishop for the Archdiocese of New Orleans from 1993 to 2006. He was a member of the Society of the Divine Word.

== Biography ==
The eldest of seven sons, Carmon was born in Opelousas, Louisiana. He studied at the seminary of the Society of the Divine Word in Bay St. Louis, Mississippi, and at Divine Word College in Epworth, Iowa. He joined the Society of the Divine Word in 1946, and was ordained to the priesthood on February 2, 1960. He served as a missionary to Papua New Guinea from 1961 to 1968. He was pastor of St. Elizabeth's Church (1968–1985) and of Our Lady of the Gardens Church (1985–1988), both in Chicago, Illinois, before serving as pastor of Holy Ghost Church in his native Opelousas, the largest Black Catholic church in the country.

On December 16, 1992, Carmon was appointed Auxiliary Bishop of New Orleans and Titular Bishop of Rusicade by Pope John Paul II. He received his episcopal consecration on February 11, 1993, from Archbishop Francis Schulte, with Bishops Wilton Gregory and Harry Flynn serving as co-consecrators.

After reaching the mandatory retirement age of 75, Carmon resigned as Auxiliary Bishop of New Orleans on December 13, 2006. He died on November 11, 2018, at the age of 87.

== Episcopal succession ==
Catholic Church titles
Preceded by –	Auxiliary Bishop of New Orleans; 1993–2006	Succeeded by –
