= Timothy Dempsey =

- Title: Reverend Monsignor

Personal life
- Born: October 21, 1867 Cadamstown, Offaly County, Ireland
- Died: April 6, 1936 (aged 68) St. Louis, Missouri, U.S.
- Resting place: Exiles' Rest, Calvary Cemetery, St. Louis
- Education: St. Patrick's, Carlow College
- Known for: Founding charitable institutions for the poor; “Father Tim’s Free Lunch Room”
- Other name: Father Tim
- Occupation: Catholic priest, social reformer
- Honors: Domestic Prelate (Monsignor), 1923

Religious life
- Religion: Roman Catholic
- Institute: Archdiocese of St. Louis
- Profession: Priest
- Ordination: June 14, 1891

Senior posting
- Based in: St. Louis, Missouri
- Present post: Pastor of St. Patrick's Church (1898–1936)
- Previous post: Curate at Indian Creek; Moberly; St. Louis parishes

Timothy Dempsey (October 21, 1867 – April 6, 1936) was an ordained Roman Catholic priest who was born in Cadamstown, Ireland, and served the Archdiocese of St. Louis, Missouri, from 1891 through 1936.

Dempsey was instrumental in helping the working class and the poor of St. Louis, founding a hotel for working men in 1906, a hotel for working women in 1911, and a segregated hotel for working African American workers in 1922. Dempsey created "Father Tim's Free Lunch Room" during the Great Depression, serving millions of free meals to the public in a time of great need. He served as mediator for many labor disputes, helping to bring resolution to several strikes during the 1920s. In 1909, Dempsey purchased a portion of ground in an existing cemetery and devoted its use to those who had no families, naming it "Exiles' Rest," which is where he was interred in 1936. The legacy of Father Tim Dempsey has continued long after his death and the organizations that he started continue to help the homeless in St. Louis, operating as "Father Tim's Charities" under the administration of the Archdiocese of St. Louis.

== Early life and career ==
Timothy Dempsey was born in Cadamstown, Ireland, in 1867, the first of eleven children born to Thomas Dempsey and Bridget Ryan. Baptized Catholic at birth, he began studying for the priesthood by the age of thirteen. He studied at the National School at Mullingar and then at Navan College. He went on to the foreign missionary college at St. Patrick's, Carlow College, Ireland, for seminary training and was ordained a priest on June 14, 1891. Soon afterwards, he was sent to the United States to serve, immigrating in 1891. Dempsey served at several Catholic churches before being assigned to his desired post at St. Patrick's Church, located at 1201 Sixth Street in the city's original Irish neighborhood, celebrating his first Mass there on July 4, 1898.

== Exiles' Rest ==
In the winter of 1906, Dempsey established a boarding house for destitute men, located at Eighth and Franklin streets in St. Louis, which he called "Exiles' Rest." On May 5, 1907, Archbishop John. J. Glennon christened the hotel and gave it the name "Father Dempsey's Hotel for Working Men." Realizing that he needed a larger space to accommodate more people, six months later Dempsey leased the buildings at 111-1121 North Seventh Street, allowing him to expand capacity in what used to be the St. Patrick's School (also noted as "Shields School"). The hotel could house 400 and posted a sign that said, "Never Closed." During its first year, the hotel had provided free lodging to over 8,000 men. The hotel also established an employment bureau, and over 500 jobs were found for the hotel's men during that inaugural year. From its founding through Father Tim's death in 1936, the hotel had recorded providing 600,000 free lodgings and over 300,000 free meals. Though the hotel charged pennies for a night's stay, Dempsey didn't necessarily require payment in advance, allowing destitute guests to pay him later when they found work and could afford to do so.

Soon after the founding of the hotel, Dempsey obtained a large section of ground in Calvary Cemetery in 1909 and named it "Exiles Rest," which was the moniker he sometimes used for the hotel. Dempsey reportedly was granted this land in the cemetery by its board of directors. He also successfully appealed to the funeral home of Bensiek-Niehaus to provide caskets and hearses, free of charge. By obtaining this plot of cemetery land, Dempsey intended to provide plots for destitute men so that they could be buried in consecrated ground.

== Day Nursery and Women's Hotel ==
Following the success of the hotel for men, Dempsey turned his attention to the needs of women. In 1910, he started a daycare for children in a building at 1019 North Sixth Street, named the St. Patrick's Day Nursery and Emergency Home, which could accommodate 100 children of poor working women. He reasoned that by providing childcare options to mothers without a husband, whether due to desertion, untimely death, incarceration or illness, it might prevent some children from being given up as wards of the state. At first, care was provided by lay women, and then briefly by the Sisters of St. Joseph of Carondelet. In 1913, it was moved into a better quarter behind the parish school at 1209 North Sixth Street. Then, by 1916, the Daughters of Charity of Saint Vincent de Paul took over and remained in charge for many years.

Once the day nursery was established, Dempsey was approached by Nellie Sullivan, with the request that he establish a hotel for women just as he had for men. Father Tim agreed and in 1911 Miss Sullivan became the first guest in the St. Patrick's Hotel for Working-women, located at 1402 North Broadway in St. Louis, the former location of the Bemont Hotel. Later, the hotel was moved to 1421 Hogan Street. By the time of Dempsey's death in 1936, the hotel for working women had provided 150,000 free lodgings and 200,000 free meals.

In 1922, Dempsey recognized a need to provide poor children with proper nutrition and instruction to prevent tuberculosis, which was prevalent at the time. To supply poor families with clothing, furniture and food, he established the White Cross Crusade, which was creatively funded by the sale of recycled newspaper.

== Other causes ==
With a great number of people out of work during the Great Depression, Dempsey opened his "Free Lunch Room" in 1931, which served over 3,000,000 meals over five years. In addition to serving meals, Dempsey's program also provided 500 weekly food baskets to poor families.

In an era of segregation, Dempsey's practice was racially inclusive. In 1922, seeing a need, he established his "Home for Colored Men," located at 1127 North Sixth Street in St. Louis. As many as 300 men were sheltered there at one time and it recorded providing shelter for 60,000 per year. In one accounting from 1934, his church congregation was described as, "Old and young, colored and white (all intermingle here) they fill three-fourths of the pews. Toward the front are a few colored women."

Further aiding children, Dempsey also created and sponsored Father Tim's Boys Drum and Bugle Corps and Pipers Band, which played at his funeral.

== Labor relations ==
Throughout his time as a priest, which coincided with the era when organized labor unions were being established as well as the Great Depression, Dempsey was instrumental in settling many labor disputes, serving as both mediator and arbitrator. By the time of his death, he had reportedly aided in the resolution and settlement of over 50 different conflicts over wages and labor conditions.

== Death ==
Father Timothy Dempsey died suddenly of a heart attack on April 6, 1936, at the age of 68. Dempsey's death shocked the city. Archbishop John J. Glennon (later promoted to Cardinal) said, "he died because his heart was too big; . . . he overworked his heart for the poor".

Reportedly six-hundred people packed the St. Joseph's Church and thousands lined the way to Calvary Cemetery. Father Tim was interred in Exiles' Rest, which he had created in 1910 as a last resting place for the poor and forgotten he had served. As a testament to his respect within the trade unions, his casket was carried by six pall bearers that were all members of the Teamsters Union, Father Tim being an honorary member of Local 600, International Brotherhood of Teamsters.

Two months following his death, on Sunday, June 7, he was given a memorial service that was held at the Municipal Auditorium and attended by many dignitaries and prominent people from all walks of life. Among the participants and speakers were U.S. Senator Bennett Champ Clark, Bishop William Scarlet, Rabii Julius Gordon, and Thomas Quinn, President of the Buildings Trades Council.

== Legacy ==
Father Timothy Dempsey's charitable work established the basis for a foundation that continues to serve the needs of the homeless in St. Louis. The agency of "Father Dempsey's Charities," part of the Archdiocese of St. Louis and located at 3427 Washington Avenue, gives up to 78 residents a place to live and help with daily nourishment, getting a job, obtaining needed medical treatment, and accessing government benefits. Father Dempsey's Charities offers guests a room equipped with a bed, dresser, nightstand, lamp, and bedding. Bathrooms and kitchen facilities are shared. Breakfast and dinner are provided.

Dempsey's charitable work inspired others to do the same. In New Orleans, a newly ordained priest who attended Kenrick Seminary in St. Louis, Father Peter M.H. Wynhoven, started the St. Vincent's Hotel in 1911, complete with inexpensive rooms, meals and an employment bureau, all based on the work of Father Timothy Dempsey. Other similarly inspired institutions were founded in Seattle, San Francisco, Newark, Omaha, Milwaukee and Kansas City.

The Ancient Order of Hibernians – Father Dempsey Division 1 is named in his honor.
