= James Blenk =

American Roman Catholic archbishop

The Most Reverend James Herbert Blenk S.M.
- Archbishop of New Orleans
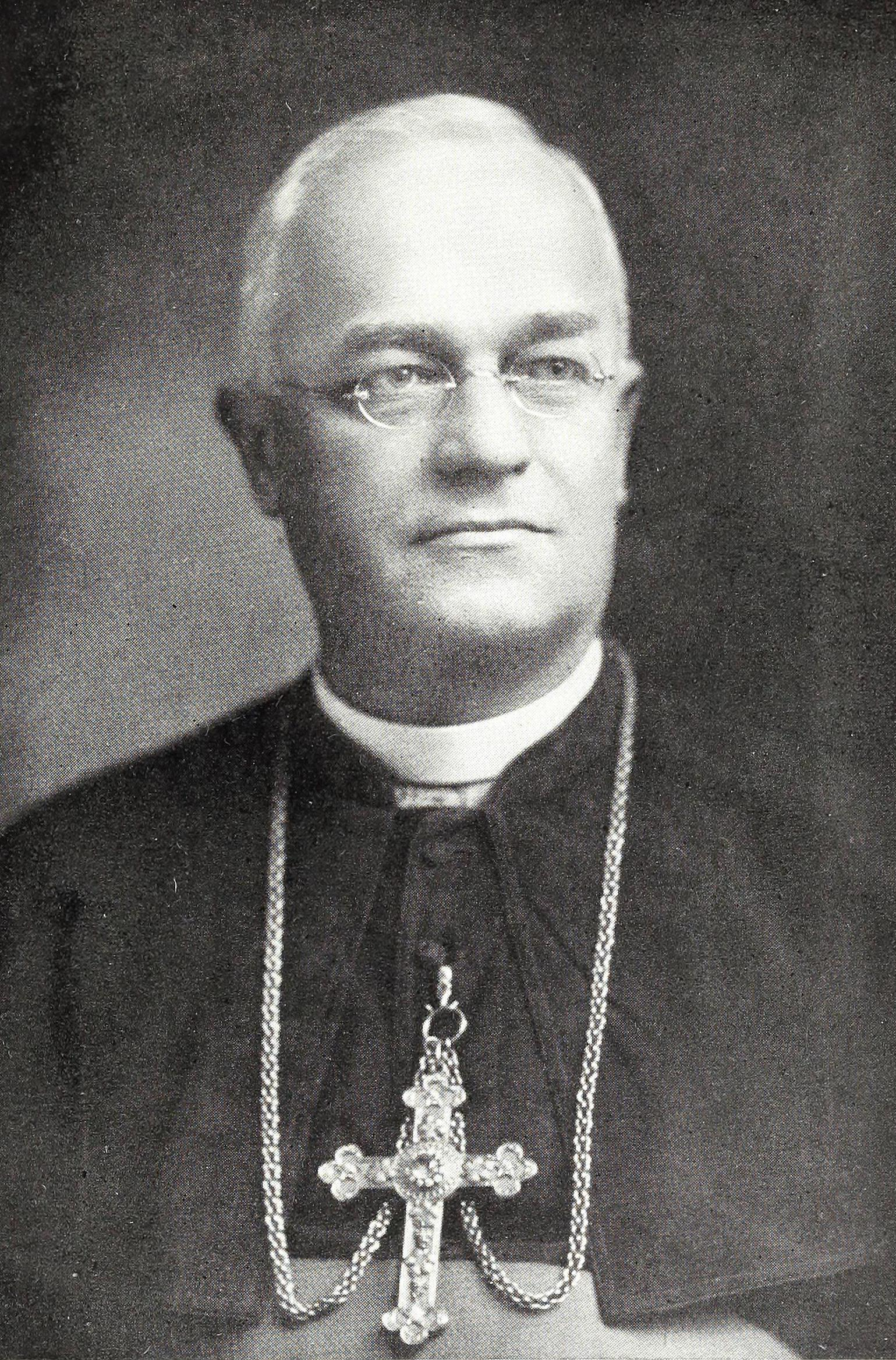
- See: New Orleans
- Installed: April 20, 1906
- Term ended: April 20, 1917
- Predecessor: Placide Louis Chapelle
- Successor: John William Shaw
- Other post: Bishop of Puerto Rico (1899–1906)

Orders
- Ordination: August 16, 1885
- Consecration: July 2, 1899

Personal details
- Born: July 28, 1856 Edenkoben, Kingdom of Bavaria
- Died: April 20, 1917 (aged 60) New Orleans, Louisiana, U.S.

James Hubert Herbert Blenk, S.M. (July 28, 1856 – April 20, 1917) was a German American prelate of the Roman Catholic Church who served as Bishop of Puerto Rico (1899–1906) and Archbishop of New Orleans (1906–1917).

== Biography ==
James Blenk was born in Edenkoben, Rhenish Palatinate, to James and Catherine (née Wiedemann) Blenk. Born and raised in a Lutheran family, he was the youngest of seventeen children and also a twin but his twin brother died at six months. In 1866 he and his family emigrated from Germany and moved to New Orleans, Louisiana, in the United States. His parents died only some weeks later and the orphan James Blenk was brought up in a Catholic family. Converting to Catholicism at age 12, Blenk was baptized at St. Alphonsus Church in 1869 and later confirmed by Archbishop Napoléon-Joseph Perché.

After completing his primary education in New Orleans, he entered Jefferson College (in Convent, Louisiana), eventually joining the Society of Mary (more commonly known as the Marist Fathers) 1878. He was then sent to the Marist House of Studies in Belley, France, and completed his probationary studies at the novitiate in Lyons before being sent to further his studies at the Catholic University of Ireland in Dublin. In Ireland, he taught mathematics at St. Mary's College, Dundalk (1881–82).

Blenk was ordained to the priesthood by Archbishop Francis Redwood on August 16, 1885. Upon his return to Louisiana in October 1885, he served as professor of humanities, rhetoric, philosophy, mathematics, and natural science at his alma mater of Jefferson College, where he later served as president from 1891 to 1897. In 1896, at the invitation of the superior general of the Marist Fathers, he visited all the houses of that religious institute in Europe. He returned to New Orleans in February 1897, and was named rector of the Church of the Holy Name of Mary in Algiers. When Archbishop Placide Louis Chapelle was chosen as Apostolic Delegate to Cuba and the Apostolic Nunciature to the Philippines in 1899, Blenk became auditor and secretary of the Apostolic Delegation.

== Bishop of Puerto Rico ==
On June 12, 1899, Blenk was appointed Bishop of Puerto Rico by Pope Leo XIII. He received his episcopal consecration on the following July 2 from Archbishop Chapelle, with Bishops Gustave Rouxel and Theophile Meerschaert serving as co-consecrators. Before his departure for Puerto Rico, the island was struck by Hurricane San Ciriaco; through his personal efforts he raised $30,000 to take with him to alleviate the sufferings of his new congregation. During his tenure, Blenk established a college and founded several schools and convents. He was, however, forced to suppress the seminary due to a lack of resources and seminarians. He also renovated the Cathedral of San Juan Bautista for over $12,000.

Blenk was promoted to the seventh Archbishop of New Orleans on April 20, 1906. He received the pallium, a vestment worn by metropolitan bishops, on April 24, 1907. During his tenure, Blenk systematized the Catholic school system in New Orleans, unifying and standardizing the Catholic educational board and insisting upon the establishment of parochial schools in each parish. He also continued the practice of segregated parishes for African Americans and established several himself, including St. Dominic Parish in 1909. He believed it was through segregated churches that "racial feelings and natural differences can be best adjusted."

Blenk was a friend and mentor to fellow Marist John Edward Gunn, Bishop of Natchez. He also organized the Louisiana State Federation of Catholic Societies (1908), Catholic Societies of Women of Louisiana (1911), Knights of Peter Claver at Opelousas (1912), and Catholic Women's Club (1916). He also wrote the article on New Orleans bishop Luis Ignatius Peñalver y Cardenas for the Catholic Encyclopedia. His final years were marked by the 1915 New Orleans hurricane and the outbreak of World War I. Furthermore, he successfully campaigned against the taxation of church rectories and for the abolition of race track gambling.

== Death ==
Blenk died eleven years after his appointment to New Orleans, aged 60.

Archbishop Blenk was the principal consecrator of Bishops John William Shaw (1863–1934), Joseph Patrick Lynch (1872–1954), John Edward Gunn (1863–1924) and John Laval (1854–1937), the Auxiliary Bishop of New Orleans. John William Shaw became his successor as Archbishop of New Orleans.

Catholic Church titles
Preceded by Francisco Javier Valdés y Noriega, O.S.A.	Bishop of Puerto Rico; 1899–1906	Succeeded by William Ambrose Jones, O.S.A.
Preceded by Placide Louis Chapelle	Archbishop of New Orleans; 1906–1917	Succeeded by John William Shaw
