= Louis Abel Caillouet =

American Catholic bishop (1900–1984)

Most Reverend Louis A. Caillouet
- Auxiliary Bishop of New Orleans
- Church: Catholic Church
- See: Titular See of Setea
- Appointed: August 2, 1947
- In office: October 28, 1947 - July 7, 1976

Orders
- Ordination: March 7, 1925
- Consecration: October 28, 1947 by Joseph Francis Rummel

Personal details
- Born: August 2, 1900 Thibodaux, Louisiana
- Died: September 16, 1984 (aged 84) New Orleans, Louisiana

Louis Abel Caillouet (August 2, 1900 – September 16, 1984) was a bishop of the Catholic Church in the United States. He served as auxiliary bishop of the Archdiocese of New Orleans from 1947 to 1976.

== Biography ==
Born in Thibodaux, Louisiana, Louis Caillouet was ordained a priest for the Archdiocese of New Orleans on March 7, 1925. On August 2, 1947 Pope Pius XII appointed him as the Titular Bishop of Setea and Auxiliary Bishop of New Orleans. He was consecrated a bishop by Archbishop Joseph Rummel on October 28, 1947. The principal co-consecrators were Bishops Jules Jeanmard of Lafayette in Louisiana and Charles Greco of Alexandria in Louisiana. He participated in all four sessions of the Second Vatican Council from 1962 to 1965. Caillouet continued to serve as an auxiliary bishop until his resignation was accepted by Pope Paul VI on July 7, 1976. He died on September 16, 1984, at the age of 84. He is buried in St. Joseph Cemetery in Thibodaux.

== Episcopal succession ==
Catholic Church titles
Preceded by –	Auxiliary Bishop of New Orleans; 1947–1976	Succeeded by –
