= Luis Ignatius Peñalver y Cárdenas =

Spanish bishop (1749–1810)

- Archbishop of Guatemala
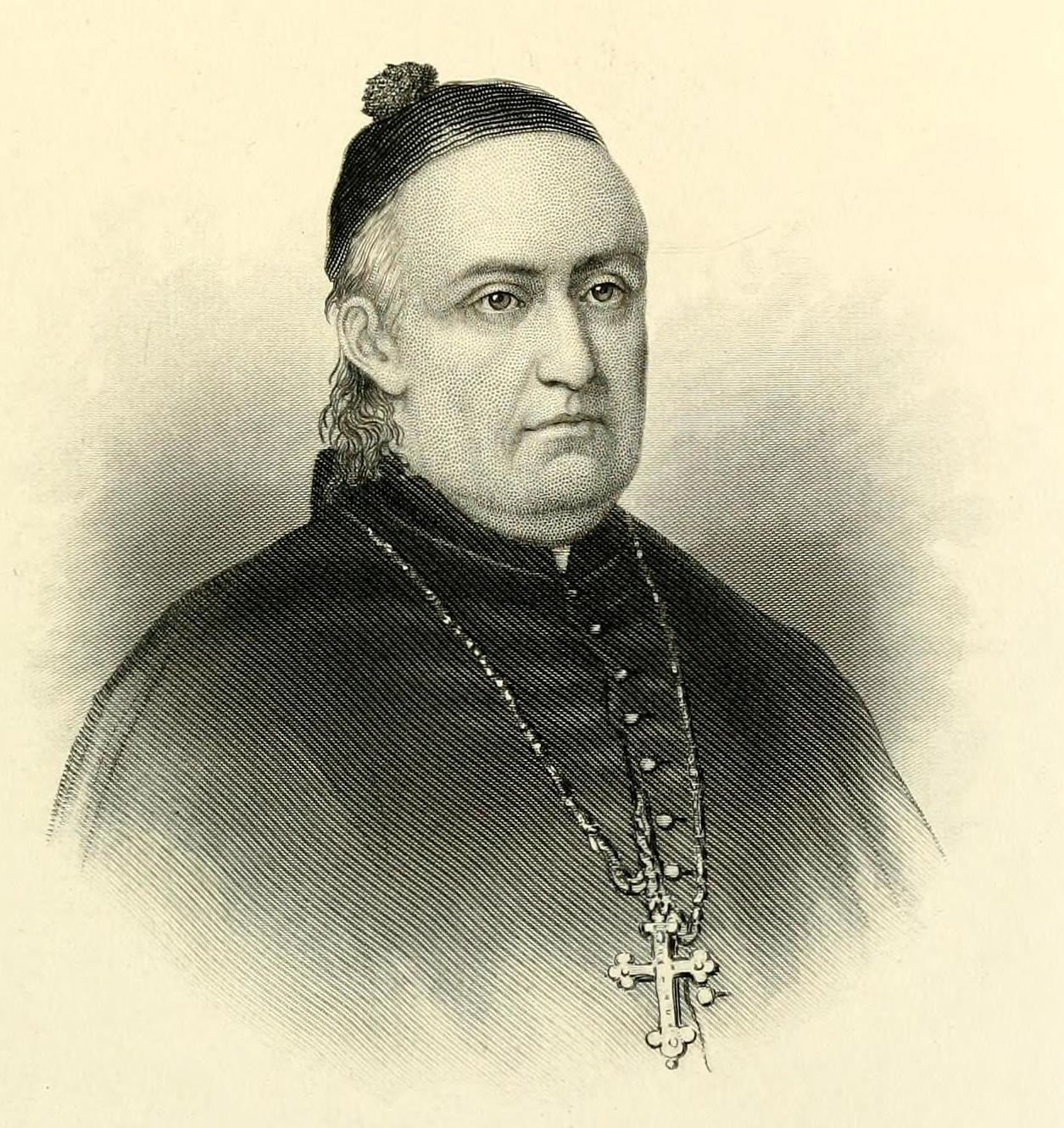
- Church: Catholic Church
- Appointed: 17 June 1794
- Previous posts: Archbishop of Guatemala; Bishop of Louisiana and the Two Floridas

Orders
- Ordination: 4 April 1772 by Santiago José Hechavarría y Elguesúa
- Consecration: 26 April 1795 by Francisco De Cuerda

Personal details
- Born: 3 April 1749 Havana
- Died: 17 July 1810 (aged 61) Havana
- Denomination: Catholic
- Education: St. Ignatius College, Havana
- Alma mater: University of St. Jerome

Luis Ignatius Peñalver y Cárdenas (3 April 1749 – 17 July 1810) was a Cuban Catholic prelate who served as Bishop of New Orleans, and as Archbishop of Guatemala.

== Biography ==
He was born in Havana, the son of a wealthy and noble family. After studying belles-lettres and philosophy in St. Ignatius College, Havana, he followed there the courses of the University of St. Jerome and in 1771 obtained the degree of Doctor of Theology. His bishop entrusted to him several missions of an administrative nature, and in 1773 appointed him provisor and vicar-general.

When Pope Pius VI, at the request of Charles IV of Spain, created Louisiana and the Floridas a diocese, distinct from the diocese of Santiago de Cuba, Luis Penalver was made its first bishop. He made his entrance into New Orleans on 17 July 1795, took formal possession of his see, and in the following December published an "Instrucción para el govierno de los párrocos de la diócesis de la Luisiana". He soon began the visitation of his diocese, which then extended over the country known later as the Louisiana Purchase Territory.

On 21 April 1796, he was at Iberville, on 8 November of the same year at Natchitoches, and at Pensacola on 7 May 1798. Upon his return in 1799, he drew up a report in which he complained of the ignorance, irreligion, and the want of discipline which then prevailed in Louisiana.

Peñalver was promoted to the Archiepiscopal See of Guatemala on 20 July 1801, and by a Rescript from Rome was empowered to transfer his authority in Louisiana and the Floridas to Thomas Hasset, his vicar-general, and to Patrick Walsh. After a chase by an English war-vessel, Peñalver arrived at Guatemala.

At his own expense he built a hospital and various schools. He resigned his see on 1 March 1806, and, returning to Havana, devoted the last years of his life to charitable works. At his death he bequeathed $200,000 to the poor and several important legacies to educational institutions. James Blenk writes of him that he was "a man of great talents, zeal, and piety, whose administration was marked by an uncommon degree of wisdom and a strict attachment to the discipline of the Church." He died in Havana, aged 61.

== Sources ==
- John Dawson Gilmary Shea, History of the Catholic Church in the U.S., 1763-1815 (New York, 1888)
- Cheney, David M. "Archdiocese of Guatemala". Catholic-Hierarchy.org. (for Chronology of Bishops)^{self-published}
- Chow, Gabriel. "Metropolitan Archdiocese of Santiago de Guatemala". GCatholic.org. (for Chronology of Bishops)^{self-published}
