= Gustave Augustin Rouxel =

French-born bishop (1840-1908)

Most Reverend Gustave A. Rouxel
- Auxiliary Bishop of New Orleans
- Church: Catholic Church
- See: Titular See of Curium
- Appointed: February 10, 1899
- In office: April 9, 1899 - March 16, 1908

Orders
- Ordination: November 4, 1863
- Consecration: April 9, 1899 by Placide Louis Chapelle

Personal details
- Born: February 2, 1840 Redon, Ille-et-Vilaine, France
- Died: March 16, 1908 (aged 68) New Orleans, Louisiana, US

Gustave Augustin Rouxel (February 2, 1840 – March 16, 1908) was a French-born bishop of the Catholic Church. He served as auxiliary bishop of the Archdiocese of New Orleans from 1899 to 1908.

== Biography ==
Born in Redon, Ille-et-Vilaine, France, Gustave Rouxel was ordained a priest for the Archdiocese of New Orleans on November 4, 1863. On February 10, 1899 Pope Leo XIII appointed him as the Titular Bishop of Curium and Auxiliary Bishop of New Orleans. He was consecrated a bishop by Archbishop Placide Chapelle on April 9, 1899. The principal co-consecrators were Bishops Thomas Heslin of Natchez and Jose Maria Ignacio Montes de Oca y Obregón of San Luis Potosí (Mexico). He continued to serve as an auxiliary bishop until his death on March 16, 1908, at the age of 68.

Catholic Church titles
Preceded by –	Auxiliary Bishop of New Orleans; 1899–1908	Succeeded by –
