= Napoléon-Joseph Perché =

French-born prelate

The Most Reverend Napoléon-Joseph Perché
- Archbishop of New Orleans
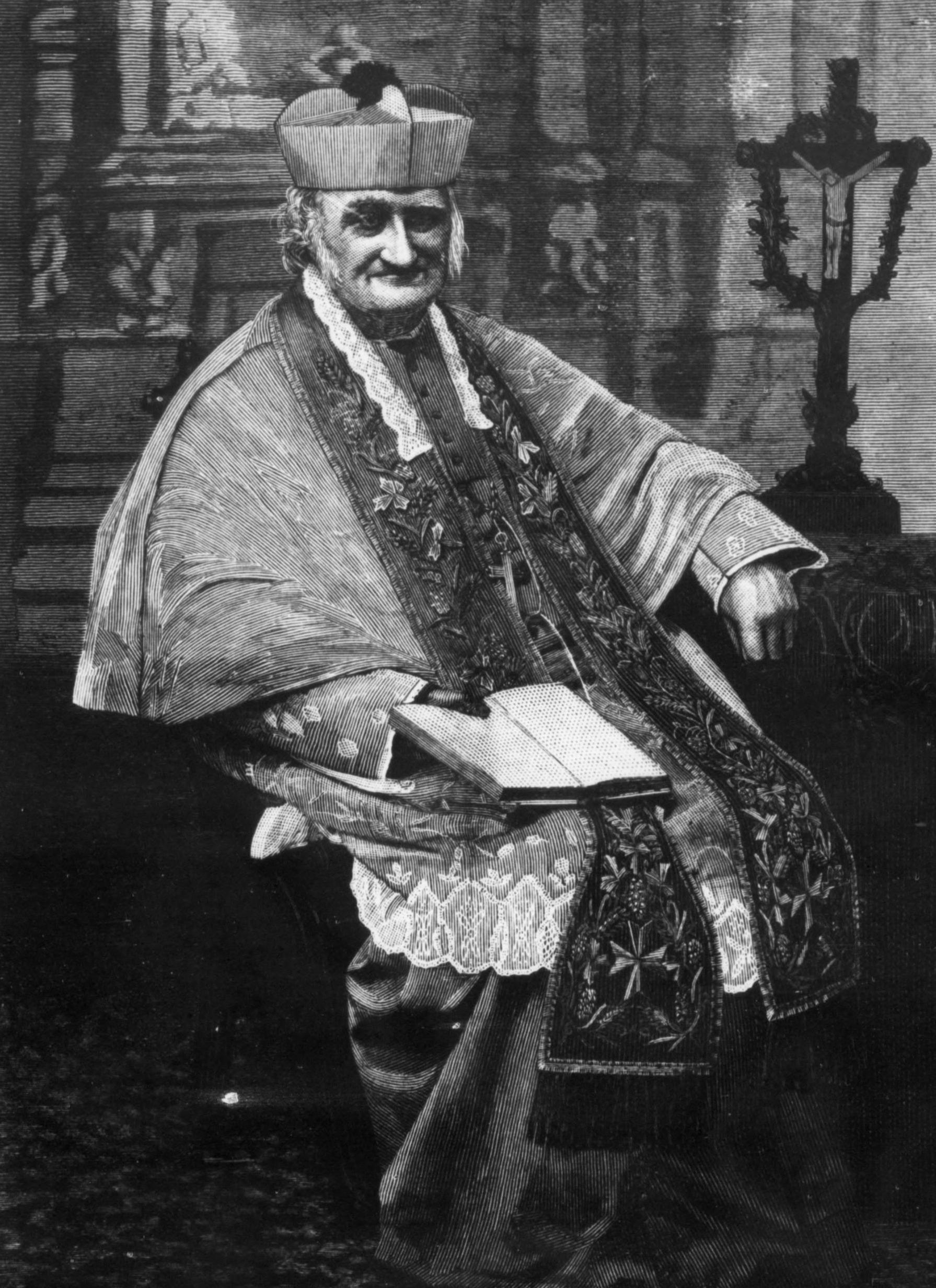
- Church: Roman Catholic Church
- See: Archdiocese of New Orleans
- In office: May 25, 1870 – December 27, 1883
- Predecessor: Jean-Marie Odin
- Successor: Francis Xavier Leray

Orders
- Ordination: September 19, 1829 by Charles Montault des Isles
- Consecration: May 1, 1870 by Sylvester Horton Rosecrans

Personal details
- Born: January 10, 1805 Angers, Maine-et-Loire, France
- Died: December 27, 1883 (aged 78) New Orleans, Louisiana, US

Napoléon-Joseph Perché (1805–1883) was a French-born prelate of the Roman Catholic Church. He served as the third archbishop of the Archdiocese of New Orleans in Louisiana from 1870 to 1883.

== Biography ==
=== Early life ===
Born on January 10, 1805, Napoléon-Joseph Perché was a native of Angers in the Department of Maine-et-Loire in France. He was ordained a priest for the Diocese of Angiers at Beaupreau on September 19, 1829, after which he served in the local diocese until 1837, when he departed for the United States.

Arriving in the United States, Perché was assigned to what was then the Diocese of Bardstown. On a visit to New Orleans, he delivered a powerful sermon that was heard by Archbishop Antoine Blanc. Seeing the need for a priest who could speak French, Blanc petitioned the Vincentians to transfer Perché to the Archdiocese of New Orleans. In 1846, he moved to New Orleans, where he was appointed chaplain to the Ursuline Convent there. Perché founded the first archdiocesan newspaper, Le Propagateur Catholique, published in French.

=== Coadjutor Archbishop and Archbishop of New Orleans ===
On February 8, 1870, Pope Pius IX appointed Perché as coadjutor archbishop of the Archdiocese of New Orleans and titular bishop of Abdera. He was consecrated on May 1, 1870, by Sylvester Horton Rosecrans. When Bishop Jean-Marie Odin died several weeks later on May 25, 1870, Perché automatically succeeded him as archbishop.

As bishop, Perché started an extensive program of parish and school expansion in the archdiocese. He erected four new parishes in New Orleans and another 23 in the surrounding towns. Perché pushed for Catholic schools because he viewed public school education as being inadequate and too secular. Catholic schools, particularly in rural areas, were often more stable, better supported, and better attended than the public schools. By 1888, as a result of his program, more than 11,000 students were enrolled in archdiocesan schools.

To support this expansion, Perché recruited several religious congregations of teaching Brothers and religious sisters from France. He also authorized the founding of a native congregation in 1871, the Sisters of the Immaculate Conception in Labadieville, Louisiana. He also established three monasteries of enclosed religious orders. In 1868, Perché launched, The Morning Star, an English-language news paper for the archdiocese. The Reverend Abram Joseph Ryan, a poet himself, served as its editor from 1871 to 1875.

Despite the archdiocese's shaky financial standing, Perché borrowed heavily to finance his expansion program, as well as his personal charity to the poor. By the mid-1870s, the archdiocese had amassed a $590,925 debt (over $10 million today); the Vatican decided it was time for change. On October 23, 1879, Pope Leo XIII appointed Bishop Francis Leray as coadjutor archbishop and apostolic administrator of the archdiocese, giving him full control over its operation. it. It would take the archdiocese 25 years to stability its finances.

=== Death and legacy ===
Napoléon-Joseph Perché died in New Orleans on December 27, 1883. His remains were buried beneath the sanctuary of the Cathedral-Basilica of St. Louis in New Orleans.

Catholic Church titles
Preceded by Jean-Marie Odin, C.M.	Archbishop of New Orleans; 1870–1883	Succeeded by Francis Xavier Leray
