= Francis Xavier Leray =

Archbishop of New Orleans

His Excellency, The Most Reverend Francis Xavier Leray
- Archbishop of New Orleans; Titular Archbishop of Ionopolis
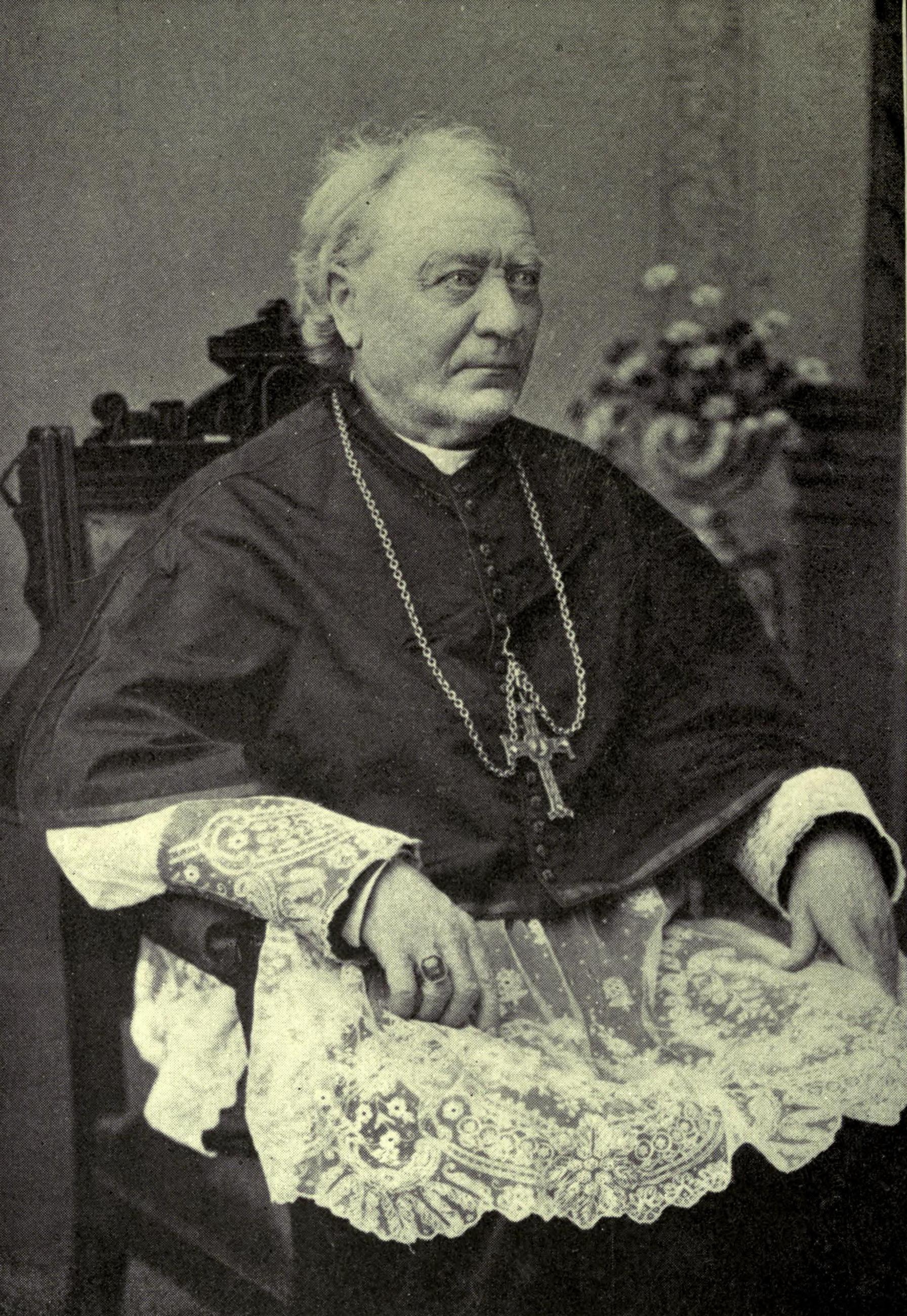
- Church: Catholic
- See: Archdiocese of New Orleans
- Installed: December 28, 1883
- Term ended: September 23, 1887
- Predecessor: Napoléon-Joseph Perché
- Successor: Francis Janssens
- Other posts: Bishop of Natchitoches (1877–1879); Coadjutor Archbishop of New Orleans (1879–1883)

Orders
- Ordination: March 19, 1852 by John J. Chanche
- Consecration: April 22, 1877 by Samuel Eccleston

Personal details
- Born: April 20, 1825 Châteaugiron, Ille-et-Vilaine, France
- Died: September 23, 1887 (aged 62) Châteaugiron
- Buried: Châteaugiron
- Motto: Omnia in caritate fiant (Let all things be done in charity)

Styles of Francis Xavier Leray
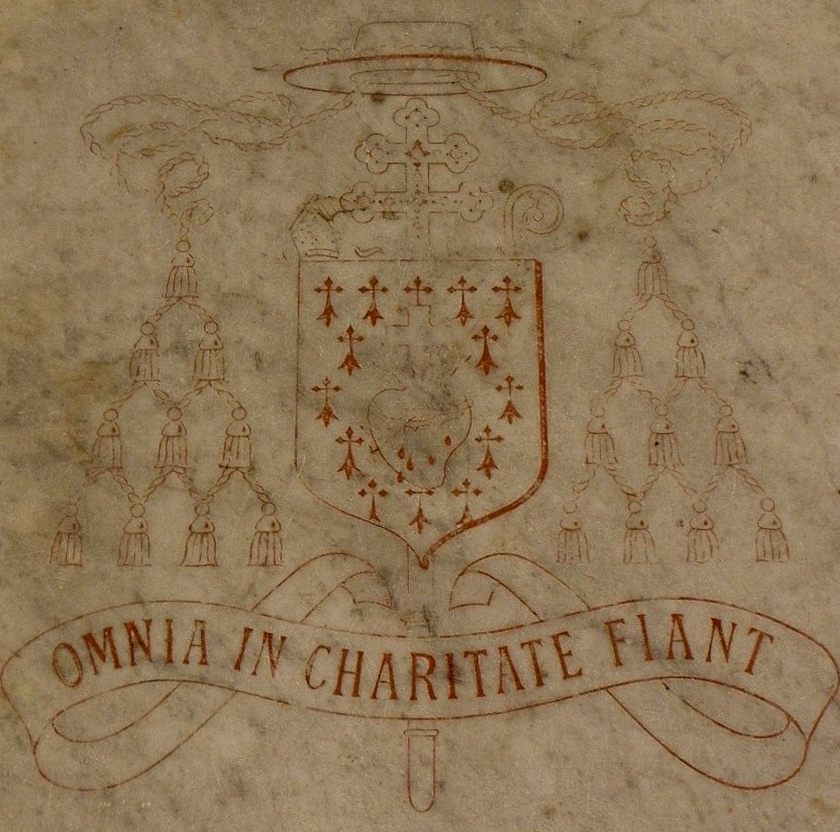
- Reference style: His Excellency; The Most Reverend
- Spoken style: Your Excellency
- Religious style: Archbishop

Francis Xavier Leray (April 20, 1825 – September 23, 1887) was a French-born prelate of the Roman Catholic Church who served as bishop of the Diocese of Natchitoches in Louisiana (1877–1879) and as archbishop of the Archdiocese of New Orleans (1883–1887).

== Biography ==
=== Early life ===
Leray was born on April 20, 1825, in Châteaugiron, Ille-et-Vilaine, in France to René and Marie (née Roncin) Leray. He entered the University of Rennes in Rennes, France, in 1833. While still a seminarian at the university, Leray was recruited in 1844 to go to the United States. Following his arrival there, Leray taught for several months at Spring Hill College in Mobile, Alabama. He then entered St. Mary's Seminary in Baltimore, Maryland, to complete his theological studies. After completing his studies in 1852, Leray accompanied Bishop John J. Chanche to Natchez, Mississippi.

=== Priesthood ===
Leray was ordained to priesthood for the Diocese of Natchez in Natchez, Mississippi, on March 19, 1852, by Chanche. After his ordination, the diocese assigned Leray as pastor of St. Peter the Apostle Parish in Jackson, Mississippi. During the yellow fever epidemics of 1853 and 1855, Leray spent much of his time tending to the sick. He barely survived his own case of the disease. In 1857, Leray was named pastor of St. Paul Parish in Vicksburg, Mississippi, where he built the first Catholic church. In 1860, he introduced the Sisters of Mercy to establish a school.

After the start of the American Civil War in 1861, Leray volunteered as a chaplain to the Confederate Army of Tennessee. On several occasions, he was captured by Union Army troops, but they released him on each occasion after identifying him as a priest. After the war ended in 1865, Leray returned to Vicksburg. In 1867, he dealt with a cholera epidemic in that city. Bishop William Elder appointed Leray as his vicar general in 1871.

=== Bishop of Natchitoches ===
On November 27, 1876, Leray was appointed the second bishop of Natchitoches, by Pope Pius IX. He received his episcopal consecration in France on April 22, 1877, from Cardinal Geoffroy Brossais Saint-Marc, with Bishop Hailandière and Charles Nouvel de La Flèche serving as co-consecrators, at Rennes Cathedral in Rennes.

=== Coadjutor Archbishop and Archbishop of New Orleans ===
Leray was named coadjutor archbishop of New Orleans and titular archbishop of Ionopolis by Pope Leo XIII on October 23, 1879. He was charged with the financial administration of the archdiocese, which was nearly $600,000 in debt as a result of the civil war. Leray managed to reduce this debt by at least half.

After the death of Archbishop Napoléon-Joseph Perché, Leray automatically succeeded him as the third archbishop of New Orleans on December 28, 1883. He received the pallium, a vestment worn by metropolitan bishops, from Cardinal James Gibbons in January 1884.

Leray attended the Third Plenary Council of Baltimore in Baltimore, Maryland, in November 1884, and continued his efforts to relieve New Orleans of its immense debt for the rest of his tenure. An advocate of Catholic education, he increased the number of parochial schools from 36 to 70 during his administration as well.

=== Death ===
In the hope of strengthening his failing health, Leray returned in 1887 to Châteaugiron in France. He died there on September 23, 1887, at age 62.

Catholic Church titles
Preceded by Augustus Marie Martin	Bishop of Natchitoches; 1877–1879	Succeeded by Anthony Durier
Preceded by Napoléon-Joseph Perché	Archbishop of New Orleans; 1883–1887	Succeeded by Francis Janssens
