= Francis Janssens =

American Catholic bishop (1843–1897)

The Most Reverend Francis Janssens
- Archbishop of New Orleans
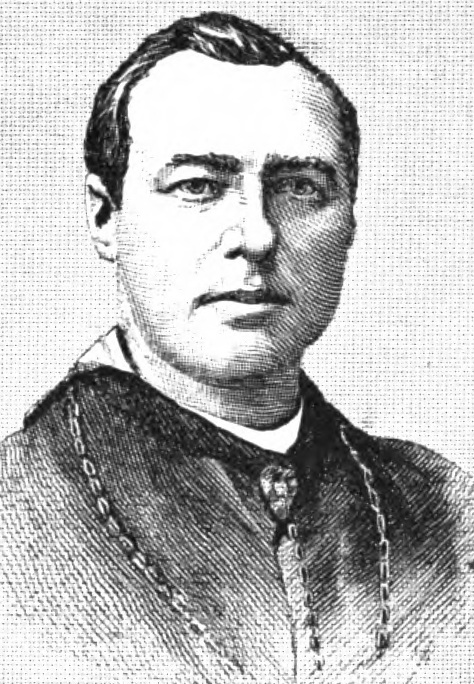
- Church: Catholic Church
- Archdiocese: New Orleans
- Appointed: August 7, 1888
- Term ended: June 10, 1897
- Predecessor: Francis Xavier Leray
- Successor: Placide Louis Chapelle
- Previous post: Bishop of Natchez (1881–1888)

Orders
- Ordination: December 21, 1867 by Henricus Franciscus Bracq
- Consecration: May 1, 1881 by James Gibbons

Personal details
- Born: October 17, 1843 Tilburg, North Brabant, Netherlands
- Died: June 10, 1897 (aged 53) Gulf of Mexico
- Motto: Fortitudo mea Deus (Latin for 'God is my strength')
- Coat of arms

Francis Anthony Joseph August Janssens (October 17, 1843 – June 10, 1897) was an American prelate of the Catholic Church. A native of the Netherlands, he served as Bishop of Natchez from 1881 to 1888 and as Archbishop of New Orleans from 1888 until his death in 1897.

== Early life and education ==
Janssens was born on October 17, 1843, in Tilburg, in the predominantly Catholic province of North Brabant in the Netherlands. His father, Cornelis Jan Janssens (1789–1868), was a wealthy wool merchant who served on the municipal council for 20 years. His mother, Josephina Anna Janssens (née Dams; 1807–1883), was a daughter of Willebrord Dams, who served as burgemeester of Tilburg from 1811 to 1816. Janssens was baptized Franciscus Antonius Josephus Augustinus. He was the fourth of his parents' six children, and had five half-siblings from his father's first marriage.

At the age of nine, Janssens enrolled at a boarding school run by the Brothers of Tilburg in Sint-Michielsgestel. From 1856 to 1862, he attended Gymnasium Beekvliet, the minor seminary of the Diocese of 's-Hertogenbosch. He then began his studies for the priesthood at the major seminary in Haaren.

While still a seminarian at Haaren, Janssens was recruited for the Diocese of Richmond in Virginia by Bishop John McGill. In 1866, he transferred to the American College in Leuven, Belgium, to complete his studies and train as a foreign missionary.

== Priesthood ==
On December 21, 1867, Janssens was ordained a priest by Bishop Henricus Franciscus Bracq at St. Bavo's Cathedral in Ghent. He arrived at Richmond in September 1868. He first served as an assistant at St. Peter's Cathedral before becoming rector in 1870.

In addition to his duties at the cathedral, Janssens served as secretary to Bishop McGill and chancellor of the diocese. He also did pastoral work at the missions in Warrenton, Gordonsville, and Culpeper. After Bishop McGill was succeeded by Bishop James Gibbons, Janssens was named vicar general of the diocese in December 1872 and continued in that position under Bishop John J. Keane.

During his time as a priest in Richmond, Janssens baptized the infant son of former Confederate senator Thomas Jenkins Semmes and the adult sisters of Confederate colonel John S. Mosby, also spending his first Christmas in the United States at Colonel Mosby's home.

When Father John de Neve took temporary leave as rector of the American College at Leuven in 1871, Father Edmond Dumont took his place until his appointment as Bishop of Tournai in 1872. The faculty wanted Janssens to replace Dumont but this was opposed by Bishop Gibbons, who did not want to lose his vicar general. Cardinal Alessandro Barnabò, prefect of the Congregation for the Propagation of the Faith (which oversaw the college), appointed him as rector in 1873, but Janssens refused to accept, writing, "I am still quite young, not yet thirty years and without experience...My natural inclinations are for an active life."

== Bishop of Natchez ==
In November 1880, after Bishop William Henry Elder of the Diocese of Natchez in Mississippi was promoted to Archbishop of Cincinnati, the bishops of the ecclesiastical province of New Orleans submitted to Rome a terna (a list of three candidates) for Natchez that included Janssens, Henry P. Northrop, and Nicolaus Aloysius Gallagher. The Congregation for the Propagation of the Faith (which then oversaw the affairs of the Church in the United States) nominated Janssens in January 1881, and Pope Leo XIII confirmed his appointment as the fourth Bishop of Natchez on the following February 18.

Janssens received his episcopal consecration on May 1, 1881, from Gibbons (then Archbishop of Baltimore) at St. Peter's Cathedral in Richmond, with Bishops Keane and Thomas Becker serving as co-consecrators. At the beginning of his tenure in 1881, the Diocese of Natchez contained 41 churches, 19 secular priests, 12 parochial schools, and three schools for Black children. By the end of his tenure in 1888, there were 59 churches, 30 secular priests, 17 parochial schools, six schools for Black children, and two schools for Native Americans.

As Bishop of Natchez, Janssens over the saw the completion of St. Mary's Cathedral, which he consecrated in September 1886. He also opened a minor seminary in October 1885, but it was forced to close the following year due to financial difficulties and low enrollment. After encountering the Choctaw in his diocese, Janssens traveled to Europe in 1882 to seek missionaries and financial aid to minister to them; he recruited Father Bartholomew J. Bekkers from Delft, who established Holy Rosary Mission in Neshoba County in 1884.

Janssens attended the third Plenary Council of Baltimore (1884), where he sat on the committee that prepared the Baltimore Catechism.

== Archbishop of New Orleans ==
In 1887, Archbishop Francis Xavier Leray of the Archdiocese of New Orleans in Louisiana sought a coadjutor archbishop with the right of succession due to his declining health. On February 10 of that year, the bishops of the ecclesiastical province of New Orleans submitted a terna that included Bishops Janssens, Edward Fitzgerald, and Anthony Durier. However, Leray preferred Father Placide Louis Chapelle and opposed the appointment of a non-French coadjutor. Before Rome could make a decision, Leray died in September.

In November 1887, the bishops resubmitted a new terna with the same names to serve as archbishop. After the Congregation for the Propagation of the Faith nominated Janssens, Pope Leo XIII confirmed his appointment as the fifth Archbishop of New Orleans on August 7, 1888. He was installed on the following September 16, and received the pallium on May 8, 1889.

When Janssens became archbishop in 1888, the Archdiocese of New Orleans had 162 priests and 80 churches with five under construction. By the end of his tenure in 1897, there were 207 priests and 161 churches, as well as 103 parochial schools. In September 1891, he opened St. Joseph Preparatory Seminary, originally located near Ponchatoula and staffed by the Benedictines.

== Ministry to African Americans ==
Throughout his time as a bishop in Mississippi and Louisiana, Janssens took a special interest in ministering to the spiritual and social needs of African Americans. In an August 1893 letter to Katharine Drexel, he wrote, "There is nothing in my administration of the Diocese that worries me more than our colored people."

As Bishop of Natchez, Janssens opened three Catholic schools for Black children, including one that opened in 1886 in a building next to his official residence. In March 1887, he published an article in The Catholic World, in which he wrote about the actions the Church should take "to gain a firm foothold among the negroes". He expressed his belief that

the permanent improvement of the negro race should come from within, should be brought about by the best men of their own race...The colored race, though living harmoniously with the white race, mistrusts anything carried on for their benefit by the whites, unless the colored men are themselves allowed to act the principal parts.

Thus, he advocated for Black priests to minister to Black Catholics:

Why should not a colored boy who receives a special religious training obtain the grace from God to lead a pure life? And if, once a priest, he feels he has to work for his own people; he knows their character and peculiarities; he can suit himself to their manner of living; he will feel the inconveniences and sacrifices less than white priests; he will elevate his own race and show his people that the Catholic Church alone is the church of all nations, that she recognizes 'neither Jew nor Greek, Roman nor barbarian,' neither race nor color.

Father Charles Uncles, who would become the first Black Catholic priest ordained on American soil in 1891, later wrote that Janssens's article in The Catholic World had greatly encouraged him.

Janssens's ministry to African Americans continued as Archbishop of New Orleans. He frequently condemned the Regulators, a white supremacist organization that was active in Louisiana. In 1889, he prohibited members of the Regulators from receiving the sacraments, saying, "Better sometimes to cut off a few members than to have a cancer set in the whole body." In 1896, he called for civil authorities to "disband and punish" the group. He also described anti-miscegenation laws as "unjust and uncalled for". His actions earned the praise of Louis A. Martinet (1849–1917), a civil rights activist and founder of the Comité des Citoyens, who said, "The Catholic Church is more of a safeguard to us in matters affecting the equality of men than any other church."

As archbishop, Janssens was a strong supporter of the Sisters of the Holy Family, a religious order of Black nuns based in New Orleans. Through financial donations from Thomy Lafon, Janssens opened an orphanage for Black boys, a reform school for Black girls, and a retirement home for Black seniors—all of which were staffed by the Holy Family Sisters.

=== St. Katharine's Church, New Orleans ===
One of Janssens's goals as archbishop was to establish a church in New Orleans to serve the city's Black Catholics. This was not to enforce segregation, but to fill the same function as national parishes for European immigrants. He also wanted to counteract conversions among Black Catholics to Protestant groups.

However, Janssens's plan was met with opposition from some Black leaders in the city. According to Janssens, this opposition stemmed from a concern that "different churches will tend to a greater social separation." In February 1895, the Comité des Citoyens encouraged Black Catholics to avoid a separate church in The New Orleans Crusader. E.W.S. Hammond, the editor of the Southwestern Christian Advocate, described Janssens's plan as "a surrender to a most cruel prejudice, and mars an otherwise honorable record."

After receiving a donation of $5,000 (approximately $190,000 in 2025) from Katharine Drexel, Janssens renovated the abandoned St. Joseph's Church on Tulane Avenue to serve as the new Black parish. He renamed the church as St. Katharine's in her honor. Staffed by the Vincentians, the new parish was allowed to minister to all Black Catholics in the city, but they were not obligated to attend it; white Catholics were not allowed to rent pews or receive the sacraments (except communion or confession) there.

At the dedication ceremony for St. Katharine's on May 19, 1895, Janssens delivered a sermon in which he said, "The Church is one general, immense brotherhood, and should not know any distinction between its members." He continued:

It is not intended in opening and dedicating this church to convey the idea that there is a religion for the white people and one for the colored people. Mother Church accepts them all as her common children, because everyone stands on the same footing before the judgment seat of God...It is a church for their own special benefit and occupation. It is for all the colored people of New Orleans, but none of them are compelled to come here. If they prefer to remain in their own parish they are at liberty to do so...

== Death ==
During his tenure, Janssens reduced the Archdiocese of New Orleans's debt from $324,759 to about $130,000. He arranged a visit to Europe in the summer of 1897 to entirely liquidate the debt. He boarded the steamship Creole in New Orleans on June 9, 1897, but fell ill that evening and died early the next morning. His body was transferred at sea to the Hudson, and returned to New Orleans.

== Sources ==
- Kasteel, Annemarie (1992). Francis Janssens, 1843-1897: A Dutch-American Prelate. Lafayette, LA: Center for Louisiana Studies.

Catholic Church titles
Preceded by William Henry Elder	Bishop of Natchez; 1881–1888	Succeeded by Thomas Heslin
Preceded by Francis Xavier Leray	Archbishop of New Orleans; 1888–1897	Succeeded by Placide Louis Chapelle
