= Archdiocese of New Orleans =

Latin Catholic archdiocese in the United States

Coordinates: 29°57′27″N 90°06′56″W

Archdiocese of New Orleans Archidioecesis Novae Aureliae Archidiocèse de La Nouvelle-Orléans

Catholic
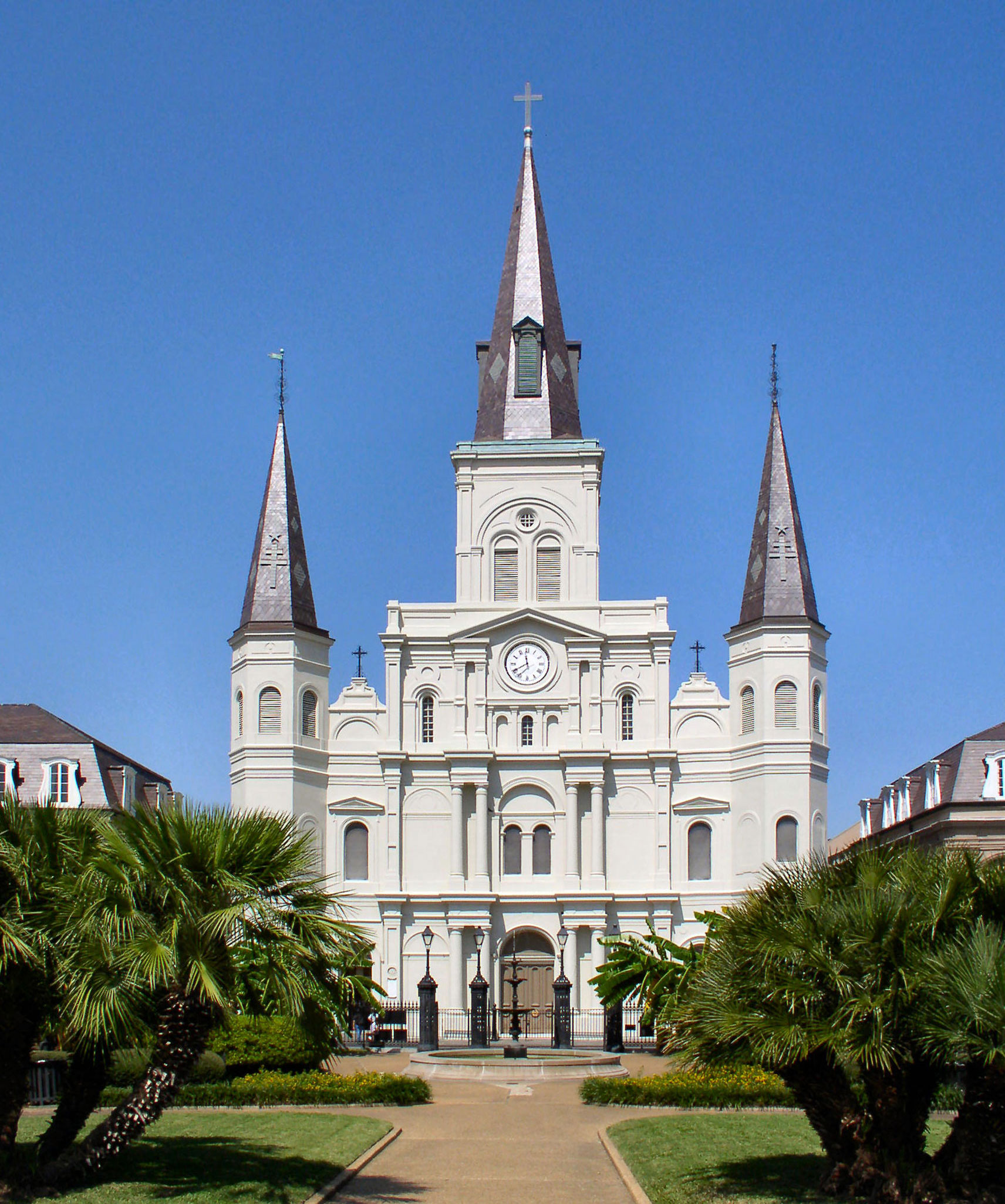
- Cathedral Basilica of Saint Louis

- Coat of arms

Location
- Country: United States
- Territory: Louisiana parishes of Jefferson (except Grand Isle), Orleans, Plaquemines, St. Bernard, St. Charles, St. John the Baptist, St. Tammany and Washington
- Episcopal conference: United States Conference of Catholic Bishops
- Ecclesiastical region: Region V
- Ecclesiastical province: Province of New Orleans
- Deaneries: 10 (I–X)

Statistics
- Area: 4,209 sq mi (10,900 km^{2})
- Population: Total; Catholics: (as of 2023); ▼1,287,117; ▼514,847 ( 40.0%)
- Parishes: ▲112 (2023)

Information
- Denomination: Catholic Church
- Sui iuris church: Latin Church
- Rite: Roman Rite
- Established: April 25, 1793 (233 years ago)
- Cathedral: Cathedral Basilica of Saint Louis
- Patron saint: St. Louis; Our Lady of Prompt Succor
- Secular priests: ▲193 diocesan (2023); ▼97 religious priests; ▼290 total; ▲221 permanent deacons

Current leadership
- Pope: Leo XIV
- Archbishop: James F. Checchio
- Vicar General: Patrick Williams
- Judicial Vicar: Peter O. Akpoghiran
- Bishops emeritus: Alfred Clifton Hughes, Gregory Michael Aymond

Map
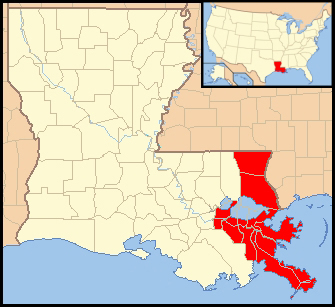

Website
- www.arch-no.org

The Archdiocese of New Orleans (Latin: Archidioecesis Novae Aureliae; French: Archidiocèse de la Nouvelle-Orléans; Spanish: Arquidiócesis de Nueva Orleans) is an archdiocese of the Catholic Church in southeastern Louisiana. It is the second oldest diocese in the United States, coming after the Archdiocese of Baltimore. The Cathedral Basilica of Saint Louis is its mother church. As of 2026, the archbishop is James F. Checchio.

== History ==
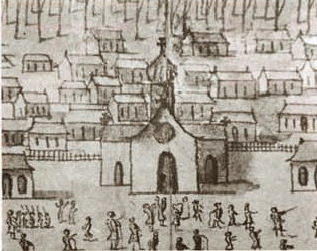
Detail of 1726 sketch that shows St. Louis Church, site of the future St. Louis Cathedral

=== Founding (1718-1799) ===
The Catholic Church has had a presence in New Orleans since before the founding of the city by the French in 1718. Missionaries served the French military outposts and worked among the native peoples. The area was then under the jurisdiction of the Bishop of Quebec. In 1721, the Jesuit priest Pierre François Xavier de Charlevoix toured the French colony of New France from the Great Lakes to the mouth of the Mississippi River. He described New Orleans as "a little village of about one hundred cabins dotted here and there, a large wooden warehouse in which I said Mass, a chapel in course of construction and two storehouses".

In 1722, the Vatican assigned the Capuchins ecclesiastical responsibility for the Lower Mississippi Valley, while the Jesuits maintained a mission, based in New Orleans, to serve the indigenous peoples. That same year, the first Catholic church was built in New Orleans, but was soon destroyed by a hurricane.

The Jesuit vicar-general returned to France to recruit priests and also persuaded the Ursulines of Rouen, France, to assume charge of a hospital and school in New Orleans. The French crown issued a royal patent authorizing the Ursulines to found a convent in Louisiana was issued September 18, 1726. Ten religious from various cities sailed from Hennebont in France in January 1727, and reached New Orleans on August 6th. They opened a hospital for the care of the sick and a school for poor children. A second church, St. Louis, was opened in New Orleans that year.

France surrendered New Orleans and the rest of its Louisiana Territory west of the Mississippi to the Spanish under the Treaty of Paris of 1763. Great Britain received control of the territories of East Florida and West Florida. However, both Florida colonies reverted to Spain as part of the Peace of Paris in 1783. The church in New Orleans was destroyed by fire in 1788.

Pope Pius VI erected the Diocese of Louisiana and the Two Floridas on April 25, 1793. It encompassed the pioneer parishes of New Orleans and Louisiana and both Florida colonies. This territory was previously under the Diocese of Santiago de Cuba (from 1763 and 1787) and later the Diocese of San Cristóbal de la Habana in Havana, Cuba (from 1787 to 1793). The first Saint Louis Cathedral was consecrated that same year.

The new Diocese of Louisiana and the Two Floridas covered all of the Spanish colonies north of Mexico from the Gulf of Mexico to British North America. Its successor, the Archdiocese of New Orleans, is second oldest Catholic diocese in the United States.

=== Joining the United States (1800-1899) ===
In 1800, Spain surrendered control of Louisiana and the rest of its North American colonies (excepting the Floridas) back to France in the Third Treaty of San Ildefonso. Three years later, France sold the territory to the United States in the Louisiana Purchase of 1803. After this change, ecclesiastical jurisdiction over Florida returned in 1806 to the Diocese of Havana (until 1823). The United States took formal possession of New Orleans in December 1803, and of Upper Louisiana in March 1804.

Reflected this change in national sovereignty from France to the United States, the Vatican in 1805 named Bishop John Carroll of Baltimore as apostolic administrator of the Diocese of Louisiana and the Two Floridas. When Baltimore became an archdiocese in 1808, the Diocese of Louisiana and the Two Floridas became one of its suffragans.

In 1823, Pope Pius VII appointed Joseph Rosati as coadjutor bishop of the Diocese of Louisiana and the Two Floridas. At the diocesan bishop's suggestion, the diocesan bishop was based in New Orleans while Rosati was based in St. Louis.

On August 19, 1825, Pope Leo XII erected the Apostolic Vicariate of Alabama and the Floridas, breaking up the Diocese of Louisiana and the Two Floridas. Although the two Florida territories were no longer part of the diocese, the pope did not change its title. But soon after, Rosati abruptly resigned the office of coadjutor bishop during a trip to Rome. At this point, the Vatican decided to split the diocese again, making St. Louis a separate see. On July 18, 1826, the same pope changed the title of the Diocese of Louisiana and the Two Floridas to the Diocese of New Orleans.

On July 19, 1850, Pope Pius IX elevated the Diocese of New Orleans to the Archdiocese of New Orleans.

=== Modern Era (1900-Present) ===
On January 11, 1918, Pope Benedict XV erected the Diocese of Lafayette in Louisiana, taking its territory from the archdiocese.Pope John XXIII erected the Diocese of Baton Rouge on July 22, 1961, taking its territory from the archdiocese. On March 2, 1977, Pope Paul VI erected the Diocese of Houma–Thibodaux, taking its territory from the archdiocese.

The archdiocese sustained severe damage in 2005 from Hurricane Katrina and Hurricane Rita. Numerous churches and schools were flooded and battered by hurricane-force winds. In some neighborhoods, such as St. Bernard Parish, parish structures were wiped out entirely.

=== Sex abuse scandal and 2020 bankruptcy filing ===
In November 2018, after consulting with community and civic leaders, the archdiocese listed 81 clergy who were "credibly accused" of committing acts of sex abuse while they were serving in the archdiocese.

On May 1, 2020, the archdiocese filed for chapter 11 bankruptcy, citing the mounting cost of litigation from sexual abuse cases and the unforeseen financial consequences of the COVID-19 pandemic. The archdiocese, which had a $45 million budget, owed $38 million in bonds to creditors and was also facing more pending sex abuse lawsuits. The pending sex abuse lawsuits, which were suspended due to the bankruptcy filing, would probably have cost the already financially struggling archdiocese millions of dollars more.

In the aftermath of the 2002 sexual abuse scandal in the Archdiocese of Boston, attorneys for the Archdiocese of New Orleans reported Lawrence Hecker and a few other priests, to the New Orleans police. Hecker was not charged with a crime, although further accusations were made over time. The archdiocese only acknowledged that Hecker was a predator in 2018. In early 2000, despite his having confessed to child abuse, the Vatican bestowed the title of monsignor on Hecker.

The diocese continued paying Hecker and other abusers retirement benefits, until a judge overseeing the diocese's bankruptcy ordered payments to stop. It was not clear in June 2023, when the documents became public, whether Hecker, aged 91, would be charged. In August 2023, Hecker acknowledged his 1999 confession in an interview conducted jointly by WWL-TV and the British newspaper The Guardian. Hecker had confessed to committing "overtly sexual acts" with at least three underage boys in the late 1960s and 1970s and revealed his close relationships with four others until the 1980s. In September 2023, a grand jury indicted Hecker on charges of aggravated kidnapping, aggravated rape, aggravated crimes against nature, and theft. This led to Hecker turning himself in. While being investigated for a separate child sexual abuse case in December 2020, Hecker confessed in a legal deposition that he still looked at child pornography.In December 2024, Hecker pleaded guilty to kidnapping and raping a boy in the mid-1970s. He was sentenced to life imprisonment on December 18th, but died just over a week later at age 93.

In October 2023 the archdiocese finally acknowledged that V.M. Wheeler had been a credibly accused child molester. An attorney and church benefactor, he had been ordained a deacon despite the church receiving a report of earlier child abuse,. In December 2022, after pleading guilty to child abuse, Wheeler was sentenced to five years probation. He died from pancreatic cancer in April 2023.

== Bishops ==
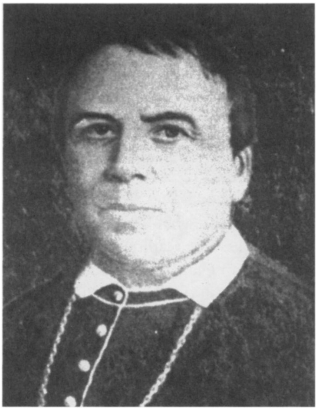
Archbishop Odin

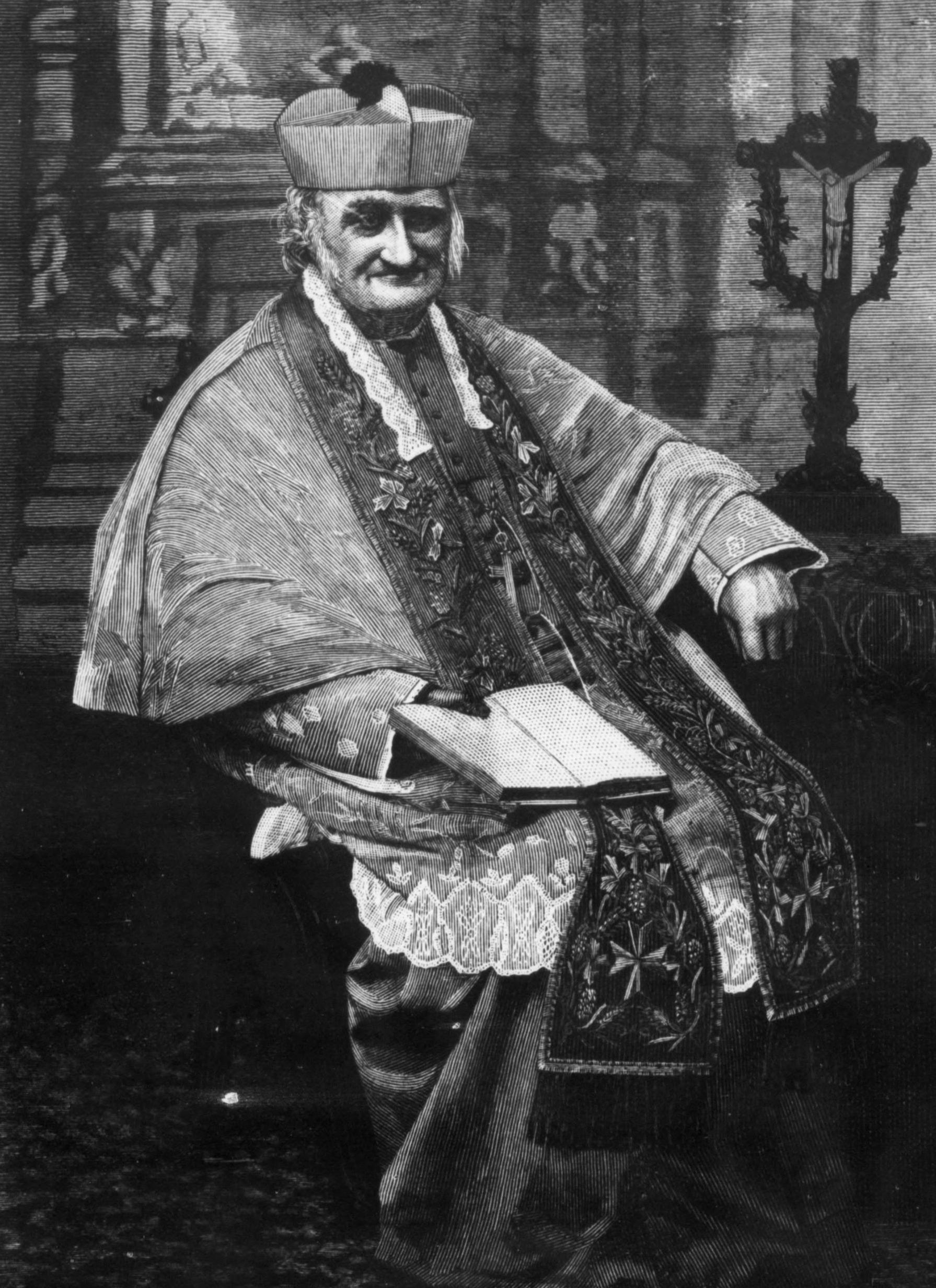
Archbishop Perché (1884)

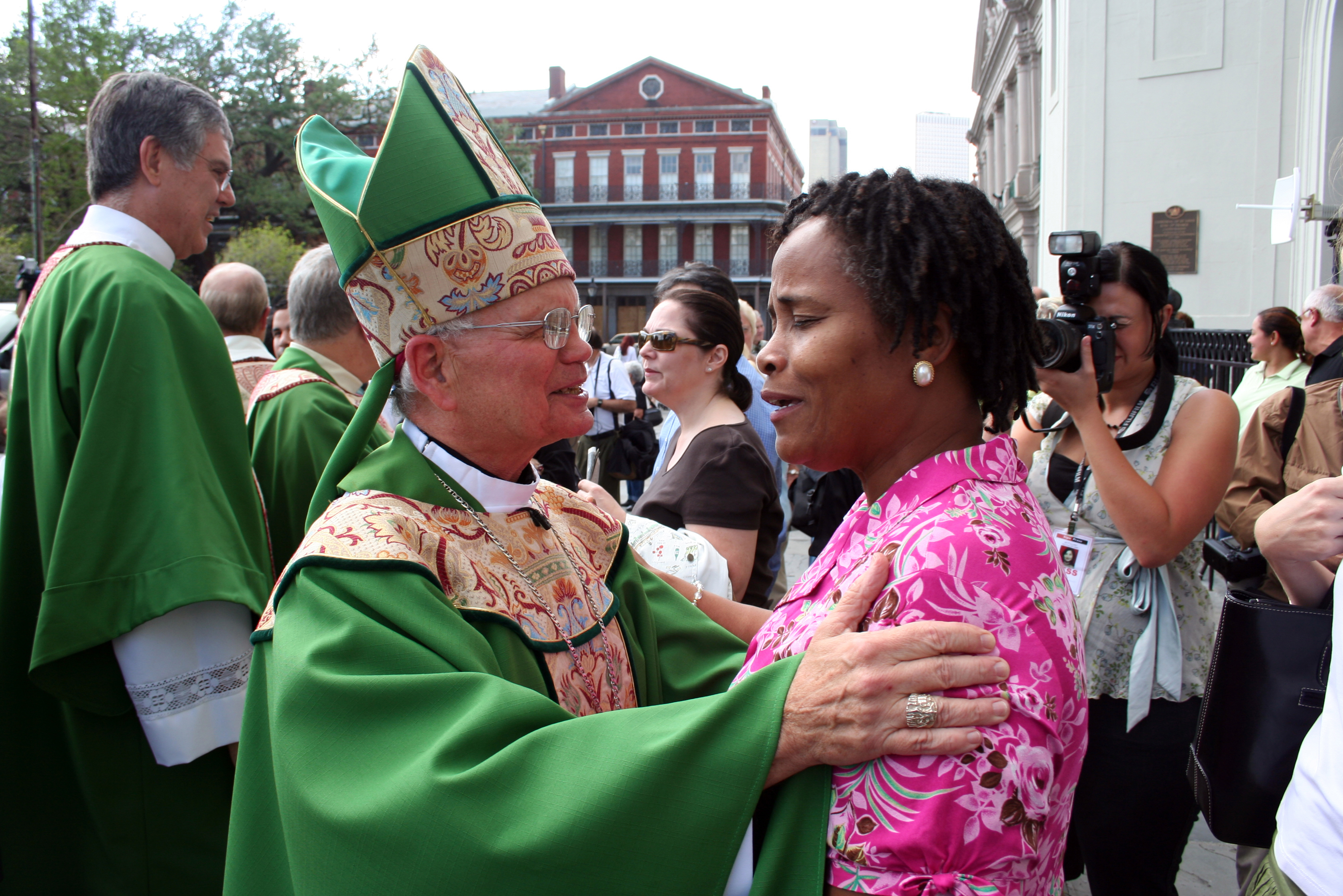
Archbishop Hughes greets parishioners at St. Louis Cathedral after the first liturgies in New Orleans since Hurricane Katrina (2005)

=== Bishops of Louisiana and the Two Floridas ===
1. Luis Ignatius Peñalver y Cárdenas (1795–1801), appointed Archbishop of Guatemala
2. Francisco Porró y Reinado (disputed, 1801–1803), then appointed Bishop of Tarazona in Spain
3. Louis-Guillaume DuBourg (1815–1825), appointed Bishop of Montauban and later Archbishop of Besançon in France. Joseph Rosati (coadjutor bishop 1823–1825, apostolic administrator 1826–1829); resigned as coadjutor bishop 1826, appointed first Bishop of St. Louis 1827

=== Bishops of New Orleans ===
1. Leo-Raymond de Neckere (1830–1833) Auguste Jeanjean (appointed in 1834; resigned before assuming office)
2. Antoine Blanc (1835–1850), elevated to archbishop

=== Archbishops of New Orleans ===
1. Antoine Blanc (1850–1860)
  - First archbishop of New Orleans
  - Helped expand the number of churches from 26 to 73 and the number of priests from 27 to 92.
  - In 1850 the central tower of Saint Louis Cathedral collapsed during a restoration. The archdiocese rebuilt the cathedral and Blanc rededicated it in 1851.
2. Jean-Marie Odin (1861–1870)
  - A Confederate sympathizer, Odin allowed priests to serve as chaplains to the Confederate States Army and nuns to serve in field hospitals.
3. Napoléon-Joseph Perché (1870–1883)
  - Expanded the Catholic school system; over 11,000 students were enrolled in its schools
  - The archdiocese accumulated a debt of $590,925 which, adjusted for inflation, is more than $10 million today.
4. Francis Xavier Leray (1883–1887)
  - Increased the number of schools from 36 to 70 within the archdiocese
  - Reduced the debt from $590,925 to $324,759
5. Francis Janssens (1888–1897)
  - Founded at least 25 new schools. In 1890, the Saint Joseph Seminary in St. Benedict in 1890 and the Chinchuba Deaf Mute Institute in Mandeville were founded.
  - Reduced the archdiocese's debt from $324,759 to $130,000
6. Placide-Louis Chapelle (1897–1905)
  - Erased the archdiocese's remaining debt
  - Served as a diplomat for the Vatican to both Cuba and Puerto Rico
7. James Blenk, S.M. (1906–1917)
  - Systemized the Catholic school system so that there was more standardization between church parishes
8. John W. Shaw (1918–1934)
  - First American-born archbishop of New Orleans
  - Founded the Notre Dame Seminary
9. Joseph F. Rummel (1935–1964)
  - Expanded the number of parishes from 135 to 180
  - Ended racial segregation within the archdiocese's churches and schools
10. John P. Cody (1964–1965), appointed Archbishop of Chicago (elevated to cardinal in 1967)
  - Served as coadjutor archbishop to Joseph Rummel and helped to desegregate the church and the Catholic school system
11. Philip M. Hannan (1965–1989)
  - Member of the Information Council of the Americas, an anti-Communist organization
  - Instituted a Social Apostolate program that donates 20 million pounds of food to women, children, and the elderly
  - Reformed the archdiocesan Catholic charity system. now one of the largest non-governmental social service agencies in New Orleans
12. Francis B. Schulte (1989–2002)
  - Restructured both the church parishes and school system
  - Created the first process for complaints of sexual abuse by priests and others employed by the church
13. Alfred C. Hughes (2002–2009)
  - Served as archbishop during Hurricane Katrina.
  - Condensed the parishes from 142 to 108 as a result of the extensive damage and exodus of nearly a fourth of the archdiocese's parishioners
14. Gregory M. Aymond (2009–2026)
15. James F. Checchio (2026-present)

=== Coadjutor archbishops of New Orleans ===
1. Napoléon-Joseph Perché (1870)
2. Francis Xavier Leray (1879–1883)
3. John P. Cody (1961–1964)
4. Alfred C. Hughes (2001–2002)
5. James F. Checchio (2025–2026)

=== Former auxiliary bishops ===
- Gustave Augustin Rouxel (1899–1908)
- John Laval (1911–1937)
- Louis Abel Caillouet (1947–1976)
- Harold R. Perry, SVD (1966–1991)
- Stanley Joseph Ott (1976–1983), appointed Bishop of Baton Rouge
- Robert William Muench (1990–1996), appointed Bishop of Covington and later Bishop of Baton Rouge
- Dominic Carmon, SVD (1993–2006)
- Gregory Michael Aymond (1997–2000), appointed Coadjutor Bishop and later Bishop of Austin and Archbishop of New Orleans
- Roger Paul Morin (2003–2009), appointed Bishop of Biloxi
- Shelton Joseph Fabre (2007–2013), appointed Bishop of Houma-Thibodaux and later Archbishop of Louisville
- Fernand J. Cheri, OFM (2015–2023), died in office

=== Other priests of this diocese who became bishops ===
- Thomas Heslin, appointed Bishop of Natchez in 1889
- Cornelius Van de Ven, appointed Bishop of Natchitoches in 1904
- Jules Jeanmard, appointed Bishop of Lafayette in Louisiana in 1918
- Robert Emmet Tracy, appointed Auxiliary Bishop of Lafayette in Louisiana in 1959 and later Bishop of Baton Rouge
- Joseph Gregory Vath, appointed Auxiliary Bishop of Mobile-Birmingham in 1966
- Gerard Louis Frey, appointed Bishop of Savannah in 1967 and later Bishop of Lafayette in Louisiana
- William Donald Borders, appointed Bishop of Orlando in 1968 and later Archbishop of Baltimore
- John Clement Favalora, appointed Bishop of Alexandria in 1986 and later Bishop of Saint Petersburg and Archbishop of Miami
- Thomas John Rodi, appointed Bishop of Biloxi in 2001 and later Archbishop of Mobile
- Joseph Nunzio Latino appointed Bishop of Jackson in 2003
- Dominic Mai Luong, appointed Auxiliary Bishop of Orange in 2003
- John Nhan Tran, appointed Auxiliary bishop of Atlanta in 2022

== Parishes ==
There are 108 parishes in the Archdiocese of New Orleans that are divided into 10 deaneries. The Archdiocese encompasses eight civil parishes: Jefferson (except for Grand Isle), Orleans, Plaquemines, St. Bernard, St. Charles, St. John the Baptist, St. Tammany, and Washington parishes.

== Schools ==
The Archdiocese of New Orleans has five colleges and over 20 high schools. Many of the parishes operate primary schools.

Previously Catholic schools were racially segregated. In 1962 there were 153 Catholic schools; that year the archdiocese began admitting black students into schools that did not admit them; that year about 200 black children attended the archdiocese's Catholic schools previously not reserved for black children. The desegregation occurred two years after public schools had integrated. Bruce Nolan of The Times Picayune stated that because Catholic schools had a later desegregation, white liberal and African-American groups faced disappointment but that the integration had not produced as intense of a backlash.

=== Seminaries ===
- Notre Dame Seminary – New Orleans
- Saint Joseph Seminary College – Saint Benedict

== Ecclesiastical province of New Orleans ==
See: Bishops in the ecclesiastical province of New Orleans and Ecclesiastical province of New Orleans
