= John Shaw (bishop) =

American clergyman

The Most Reverend John William Shaw
- Archbishop of New Orleans
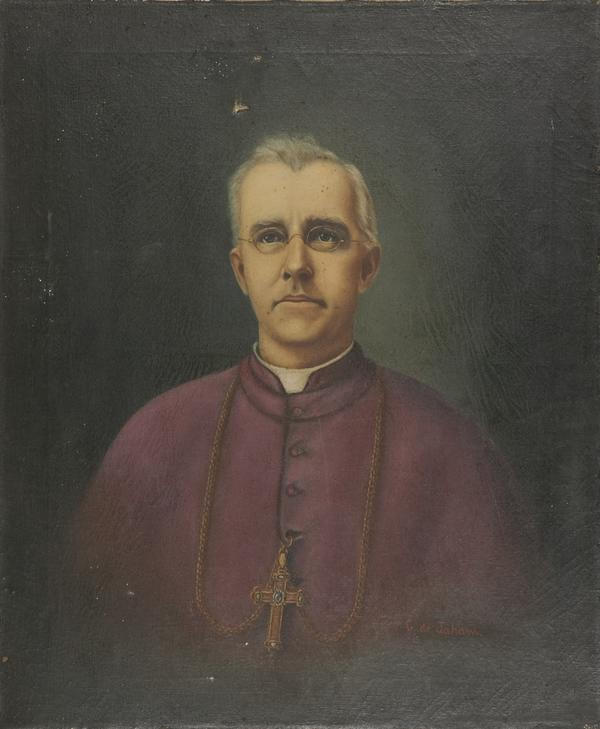
- See: New Orleans
- Installed: January 25, 1918
- Term ended: November 2, 1934
- Predecessor: James Blenk
- Successor: Joseph Rummel
- Other post: Bishop of San Antonio (1911–1918)

Orders
- Ordination: May 26, 1888
- Consecration: April 14, 1910

Personal details
- Born: December 12, 1863 Mobile, Alabama, U.S.
- Died: November 2, 1934 (aged 70) New Orleans, Louisiana, U.S.
- Denomination: Roman Catholic Church

John William Shaw (December 12, 1863 – November 2, 1934) was an American clergyman of the Roman Catholic Church. He served as Bishop of San Antonio (1911–1918) and Archbishop of New Orleans (1918–1934).

== Biography ==
One of six children, Shaw was born in Mobile, Alabama to Patrick and Elizabeth (née Smith) Shaw. He was a pupil at the parochial school of St Vincent de Paul Church and the academy of the Brothers of the Sacred Heart in his native city. He later was sent, with one of his brothers, to St Finian's Seminary at Navan, County Meath, Ireland. He studied at the Urban College of Propaganda and Pontifical North American College in Rome in 1882–1888.

On May 26, 1888, he was ordained to the priesthood by Cardinal Lucido Parocchi at the Basilica of St John Lateran.

Upon returning to the Diocese of Mobile, Shaw served as a curate at Immaculate Conception Cathedral until 1889, when he was transferred to St Peter's Church in Montgomery. In 1891, he returned to Immaculate Conception Cathedral as its rector. He served as chancellor of the diocese from 1898 to 1910.

On February 7, 1910, Shaw was appointed titular bishop of Castabala and coadjutor bishop of the Diocese of San Antonio in Texas by Pope Pius X. He received his episcopal consecration on the following April 14 from Archbishop James Blenk, S.M., with Bishops Edward Patrick Allen and Cornelius Van de Ven serving as co-consecrators.

Due to the declining health of Bishop John Anthony Forest, he was made apostolic administrator of the diocese on May 18, 1910. Upon Bishop Forest's death on March 11, 1911, Shaw succeeded him as the fourth Bishop of San Antonio. His efforts to provide relief to Mexican refugees in Texas caused the Archbishop of Mexico City to make Shaw an honorary canon of the Basilica of Our Lady of Guadalupe.

In 1915, Shaw opened St John's Seminary in his personal residence. While in San Antonio, he also restored and reopened several historic Spanish missions.

On January 25, 1918, Shaw was appointed the eighth Archbishop of New Orleans, Louisiana by Pope Benedict XV. He was the first American-born head of that archdiocese. He founded Notre Dame Seminary in 1923.

== Death ==
Shaw died from a heart attack in 1934, aged 70.

== Legacy ==
Archbishop Shaw High School in Marrero, Louisiana was dedicated in his honor on August 19, 1962, in part for his work in the development of the Catholic community on the West Bank. He had dedicated numerous facilities of Hope Haven Institute, an orphanage and foster home, on the property adjacent to the school in 1930.

Catholic Church titles
Preceded by Rocco Tornatorne, P.I.M.E.	Titular Bishop of Castabala; 1910–1911	Succeeded by Juan José Marcos Zapata
Preceded by John Anthony Forest	Bishop of San Antonio; 1911–1918	Succeeded by Arthur Jerome Drossaerts
Preceded by James Herbert Blenk, S.M.	Archbishop of New Orleans; 1918–1934	Succeeded by Joseph Francis Rummel
