= Louis Frederick Kihneman =

American Catholic prelate (born 1952)

His Excellency, The Most Reverend Louis Frederick Kihneman
- Bishop of Biloxi
- Diocese: Biloxi
- Appointed: December 16, 2016
- Installed: April 28, 2017
- Predecessor: Roger Morin

Orders
- Ordination: March 26, 1977 by Thomas Joseph Drury
- Consecration: April 28, 2017 by Thomas John Rodi, Roger Morin, and William Mulvey

Personal details
- Born: February 17, 1952 (age 74) Lafayette, Louisiana
- Education: University of St. Thomas; St. Mary's Seminary
- Motto: The Lord is my shepherd

Styles of Louis Frederick Kihneman
- Reference style: His Excellency; The Most Reverend
- Spoken style: Your Excellency
- Religious style: Bishop

Louis Frederick Kihneman III (born February 17, 1952) is an American Catholic prelate who serves as Bishop of Biloxi in Mississippi.

== Biography ==
=== Early life ===
Kihneman was born on February 14, 1952, in Lafayette, Louisiana. He attended the University of St. Thomas in Houston, earning a Bachelor of Arts and a Master of Arts in religious education and theology. He then attended St. Mary's Seminary in Houston. Kihneman was ordained to the transitional diaconate on March 26, 1977.

=== Priesthood ===
On November 18, 1977, Kihneman was ordained by Bishop Thomas Joseph Drury to the priesthood for the Diocese of Corpus Christi at the Corpus Christi Cathedral. The diocese assigned Kihneman as parochial vicar at the following parishes:

- San Isidro Labrador in Arteaga, México (1977)
- St. Anthony of Padua in Robstown, Texas (1978 to 1980)
- Christ the King parish in Corpus Christi (1980 to 1981)
- Saints Cyril and Methodius in Corpus Christi (1981 to 1983)

Kihneman was appointed pastor of Our Lady of Guadalupe Parish in Alice, Texas and St. Peter Mission in Ben Bolt, Texas in 1983. He left Our Lady and St. Peter in 1986 to become diocesan director of vocations and seminarians, along with director of the St. John Vianney House of Studies and director of Christian leadership vocations.

In 1993, Kihneman was moved from his diocesan positions to become pastor of Sacred Heart Parish in Rockport, Texas, a post he would hold for the next eight years. Bishop Michael Mulvey appointed Kihneman as vicar general in 2010. In 2014, he was also appointed as pastor of St. Philip Parish in Corpus Christi.

=== Bishop of Biloxi ===
Pope Francis appointed Kihneman as the fourth bishop of Biloxi on December 16, 2016. Kihneman was to be consecrated as a bishop on February 17, 2017, but surgery for diverticulitis forced its postponement until April 28, 2017. He was consecrated by Archbishop Thomas John Rodi with Bishops Roger Morin and William Mulvey serving as co-consecrators.

In January 2019, Kihneman released a list of three diocesan priests, none of whom were still practicing ministry, who had credible accusations of sexual abuse. Kihneman released a statement in July 2020 with Bishop Joseph Kopacz of the Diocese of Jackson denouncing the 2020 murder of George Floyd by a policeman in Minneapolis. The statement also condemned racism in the United States.

== See also ==
- Catholic Church hierarchy
- Catholic Church in the United States
- Historical list of the Catholic bishops of the United States
- List of Catholic bishops of the United States
- Lists of patriarchs, archbishops, and bishops

Catholic Church titles
| Preceded by Roger Morin | Bishop of Biloxi; 2017-Present | Succeeded by Incumbent |
