= Roger Morin =

American Roman Catholic prelate (1941–2019)

His Excellency, The Most Reverend Roger Paul Morin
- Bishop of Biloxi; Titular Bishop of Aulon
- Archdiocese: Mobile
- Diocese: Biloxi
- Appointed: March 2, 2009
- Installed: April 27, 2009
- Term ended: December 16, 2016
- Predecessor: Thomas John Rodi
- Successor: Louis Frederick Kihneman
- Previous post: Auxiliary Bishop of New Orleans (2003 to 2009)

Orders
- Ordination: April 15, 1971 by Philip Matthew Hannan
- Consecration: April 22, 2003 by Alfred Clifton Hughes, Philip Hannan, and Francis B. Schulte

Personal details
- Born: March 7, 1941 Lowell, Massachusetts, US
- Died: October 31, 2019 (aged 78) Between Boston, Massachusetts and Atlanta, Georgia, US
- Education: St. John's Seminary; Notre Dame Seminary; Tulane University
- Motto: Walk humbly and justly

Styles of Roger Paul Morin
- Reference style: His Excellency; The Most Reverend
- Spoken style: Your Excellency
- Religious style: Bishop

Ordination history of Roger Morin
History
Episcopal consecration
- Principal consecrator: Alfred Clifton Hughes
- Co-consecrators: Philip Hannan, Francis B. Schulte

Roger Paul Morin (March 7, 1941 – October 31, 2019) was an American prelate of the Roman Catholic Church. He served as the third bishop of Biloxi in Mississippi from 2009 to 2016. He previously served as an auxiliary bishop of the Archdiocese of New Orleans from 2003 to 2009.

== Early life and education ==
Roger Morin was born on March 7, 1941, in Lowell, Massachusetts, to Germain and Lillian Morin; he had two brothers, James and Paul, and three sisters, Lillian, Elaine, and Susan. He was a native of Dracut and was a communicant of Ste-Thérèse Parish. He attended St. John's Seminary in Boston, obtaining a Bachelor of Arts degree in philosophy in 1966. He then pursued his graduate studies in theology there for two years.

In 1968, Morin was named director of The Center in New Orleans, Louisiana, a social service organization run by the Archdiocese of New Orleans. He had previously worked in the archdiocese's summer Witness program. He entered Notre Dame Seminary in New Orleans that same year, earning a Master's in Divinity in 1970.

== Priesthood ==
Morin was ordained to the priesthood for the Archdiocese of New Orleans at Ste-Thérèse Church on April 15, 1971 by Archbishop Philip Matthew Hannan. After his ordination, the archdiocese assigned Morin as an associate pastor at St. Henry's Parish in New Orleans. He received a Master of Science degree in urban affairs from Tulane University in New Orleans in 1974, and was appointed director of the archdiocesan Social Apostolate in 1975.

From 1978 to 1981, at the request of New Orleans Mayor Ernest Morial, Morin served as a volunteer special assistant in his office, dealing with federal programs and projects. In 1981, Morin was named archdiocesan vicar for community affairs and parochial vicar of Incarnate Word Parish in New Orleans. He was appointed pastor of that parish in 1988. The Vatican raised Morin to the rank of monsignor in 1985. He organized Pope John Paul II's papal visit to New Orleans in 1987. Archbishop Francis B. Schulte appointed Morin as his vicar general and moderator of the curia in 2001.

== Episcopal career ==
On February 11, 2003, Morin was appointed auxiliary bishop of New Orleans and titular bishop of Aulon by John Paul II. He received his episcopal consecration on April 22, 2003, from Archbishop Alfred Hughes, with Hannan and Francis Schulte serving as co-consecrators. Morin selected as his episcopal motto, "Walk Humbly and Act Justly."

Within the United States Conference of Catholic Bishops, Morin served as chair of the Subcommittee of the Catholic Campaign for Human Development, and as a member of the Committee on Domestic Justice and Human Development and the Committee on National Collections.

=== Bishop of Biloxi ===
Morin was named the third bishop of Biloxi by Pope Benedict XVI on March 2, 2009. He succeeded Thomas John Rodi, who was promoted to archbishop of Mobile in April 2008. He was formally installed at the Cathedral of the Nativity of the Blessed Virgin Mary on April 27, 2009. Thepapal bull of appointment that is customarily read at a bishop's installation did not arrive by the time of Morin's own installation.

As bishop of Biloxi, Morin was the spiritual leader of 68,000 Catholics in southern Mississippi.

=== Retirement and death ===
Morin retired as bishop of Biloxi on December 16, 2016. He died on October 31, 2019, on a commercial airliner traveling between Boston, Massachusetts and Atlanta, Georgia.

== See also ==
- Catholic Church hierarchy
- Catholic Church in the United States
- Historical list of the Catholic bishops of the United States
- List of Catholic bishops of the United States
- Lists of patriarchs, archbishops, and bishops

== Episcopal succession ==
Catholic Church titles
Preceded by Thomas John Rodi	Bishop of Biloxi; 2009—2016	Succeeded by Louis Frederick Kihneman
Preceded by Gregory M Aymond	Auxiliary Bishop of New Orleans; 2003–2009	Succeeded by Shelton J. Fabre
