= Diocese of Biloxi =

Latin Catholic jurisdiction in the US

Coordinates: 30°24′43″N 88°55′40″W

Diocese of Biloxi Dioecesis Biloxiensis
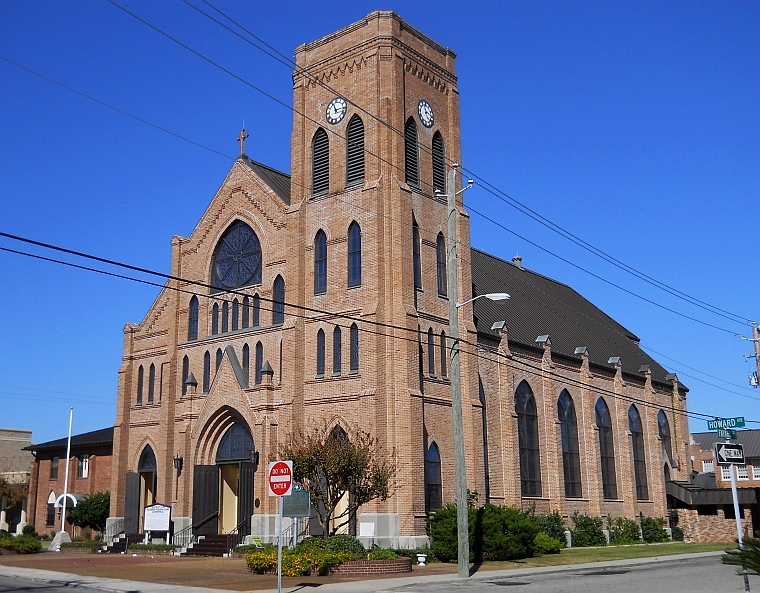
- Cathedral of the Nativity of the Blessed Virgin Mary in Biloxi

- Coat of arms

Location
- Country: United States
- Territory: Southern Mississippi (17 counties)
- Ecclesiastical province: Province of Mobile

Statistics
- Area: 24,992 km^{2} (9,649 sq mi)
- Population: Total; Catholics: (as of 2023); 831,202; 54,520 (6.6%)
- Parishes: 43

Information
- Denomination: Catholic
- Sui iuris church: Latin Church
- Rite: Roman Rite
- Established: March 1, 1977
- Cathedral: Cathedral of the Nativity of the Blessed Virgin Mary
- Patron saint: St. Joseph the Worker; St. Martin de Porres

Current leadership
- Pope: Leo XIV
- Bishop: Louis Frederick Kihneman
- Metropolitan Archbishop: Mark Steven Rivituso

Map
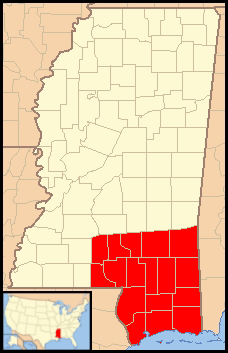

Website
- biloxidiocese.org

The Diocese of Biloxi (Latin: Dioecesis Biloxiensis) is a diocese of the Catholic Church that encompasses 17 counties in southern Mississippi in the United States. The diocese was erected in 1977. It is a suffragan diocese of the ecclesiastical province of the metropolitan Archdiocese of Mobile. The Cathedral of the Nativity of the Blessed Virgin Mary in Biloxi is the diocesan cathedral.

== Territory ==
The Diocese of Biloxi encompasses the counties of Covington, Forrest, George, Greene, Hancock, Harrison, Jackson, Jefferson Davis, Jones, Lamar, Lawrence, Marion, Pearl River, Perry, Stone, Walthall, and Wayne in southern Mississippi.

== Demographics ==
As of 2023, the Catholic population of the diocese was 54,520, which represented 6.6% of the total population of 831,202. 77 priests, 51 permanent deacons, 28 male religious and 17 female religious serve the diocese.

== History ==
=== 1700 to 1800 ===
The first Catholic priests in present-day Mississippi were French Jesuit priest who accompanied the French explorer Pierre LeMoyne d’Iberville when he arrived at present-day Biloxi in 1699. The first mass in the Mississippi Gulf Coast was celebrated at this time. The region became part of the French colony of New France, with missionaries and European settlers arriving over the next 50 years.

After the French and Indian war ended in 1763, France ceded all of its colonies east of the Mississippi River to Great Britain. The Spanish in 1783 seized southern Mississippi from the British.In 1787, three priests, Fathers McKenna, White, and Savage, arrived in Natchez from Spain and erected three missions in the vicinity. the Vatican in 1793 erected the Diocese of Louisiana and the Two Floridas, with the episcopal see in New Orleans. This diocese included the few Catholics in Mississippi.

=== 1800 to 1900 ===
During the late 18th and early 19th centuries, American settlers started moving into the Gulf Coast area of Mississippi. They successfully revolted against Spain in 1810; the United States admitted all of Mississippi as a state in 1817. In 1826, Pope Leo XII moved the new state of Mississippi into the Vicariate Apostolic of Mississippi. The pope named Bishop Louis-Guillaume-Valentin DuBourg as the vicar apostolic. In 1837, Pope Gregory XV elevated the vicariate to the Diocese of Natchez, encompassing all of Mississippi. The Biloxi area would remain part of this diocese, succeeded by the Diocese of Natchez-Jackson, for the next 140 years.

When Bishop John J. Chanche of Natchez visited the Mississippi Gulf Coast in 1841, there were no Catholic churches or schools anywhere in the state. Chanche noted that approximately 2,000 Catholics of French ancestry were living in the state. The first Catholic parish in Biloxi, Nativity Blessed Virgin Mary (BVM), was opened as a mission in 1843; its church was dedicated in 1844. . Missions were established that same year in Pass Christian and Bay St. Louis. St. Stanislaus College, a boarding school for boys, was established in 1854 in Bay St. Louis by the Brothers of the Sacred Heart.

Missionary priests established a small chapel in Pascagoula in 1859.Nativity Blessed Virgin Mary Church was destroyed by a hurricane in 1869. The new church was dedicated in 1870. The first Catholic high school in Biloxi, Sacred Heart Academy, opened in 1875. Resurrection Catholic School was started in Pascagoula in 1882 in by the Sisters of Perpetual Adoration. The Sacred Heart Mission Church was dedicated in D’Iberville in 1884. In 1898, the first Catholic church in Gulfport, St. James, was dedicated. Nativity BVM opened two grade schools in the 1890s, one for White children and one for African-American children.

=== 1900 to 2000 ===
Sacred Heart School was founded in 1900 in Hattiesburg by the Sisters of Mercy. St. John High School in Gulfport opened in 1900.That same year, Nativity BVM Church, its school and rectory were all destroyed by fire.The new church was dedicated in 1902.In 1917, St. Michael's Church was dedicated in the Point Cadet area of Biloxi.

Pope Paul VI erected the Diocese of Biloxi, with territory taken from the Diocese of Natchez-Jackson on March 1, 1977. The pope appointed Auxiliary Bishop Joseph Lawson Howze of Natchez-Jackson as the first bishop of Biloxi. He became the first African-American to be appointed a Catholic bishop in the 20th century.In 1980, Pope John Paul II elevated the Diocese of Mobile to a metropolitan archdiocese and designated the Diocese of Biloxi as a suffragan of the new metropolitan see.

=== 2000 to present ===
Howze retired in 2001 after 24 years as bishop of Biloxi.Thomas John Rodi of New Orleans was named the next bishop of Biloxi by John Paul II in 2001.

Hurricane Katrina hit the Mississippi Coast in 2005. Of the 433 parish buildings in the diocese, only three were left undamaged.St. Paul's Church in Pass Christian was destroyed. At that point, Rodi decided to merge St. Paul Parish with Our Lady of Lourdes Parish while keeping both churches. In 2007, 157 St. Paul parishioners sued the diocese over control of donated funds for rebuilding their church. The suit was dismissed in court. Rodi served in Biloxi until 2008, when he was named archbishop of Mobile.

Auxiliary Bishop Roger Morin of New Orleans was named the third bishop of Biloxi by Pope Benedict XVI in 2009. In 2016, Morin resigned.As of 2023, the bishop of the Diocese of Biloxi is Louis Kihneman III from the Diocese of Corpus Christi. He was appointed in 2016.

== Bishops ==
=== Bishops of Biloxi ===
1. Joseph Lawson Howze (1977 – 2001)
2. Thomas John Rodi (2001 – 2008), appointed Archbishop of Mobile
3. Roger Morin (2009 – 2016)
4. Louis Frederick Kihneman (2017 – present)

=== Other diocesan priest who became bishop ===
- Ronald Paul Herzog, appointed Bishop of Alexandria in 2004

== Education ==
As of 2025, the Diocese of Biloxi has eight elementary schools, three grades 7-12 schools and two K-12 schools

=== Grades 7 to 12 schools ===
- Our Lady Academy – Bay St. Louis
- St. Patrick Catholic High School – Biloxi
- Saint Stanislaus College – Bay St. Louis

=== Grades K-12 schools ===
- Resurrection Catholic School – Pascagoula
- Sacred Heart Catholic School – Hattiesburg

== Sexual abuse ==
Several diocesan priests have been credibly accused of sexual misconduct involving minors. These cases go back to the founding of the diocese in 1977. Bishop Kihneman acknowledged five of these names as credibly accused of sexual misconduct of minors in 2019, but recognized that this was a “small, belated step forward.”
