= St. Patrick Catholic High School (Biloxi, Mississippi) =

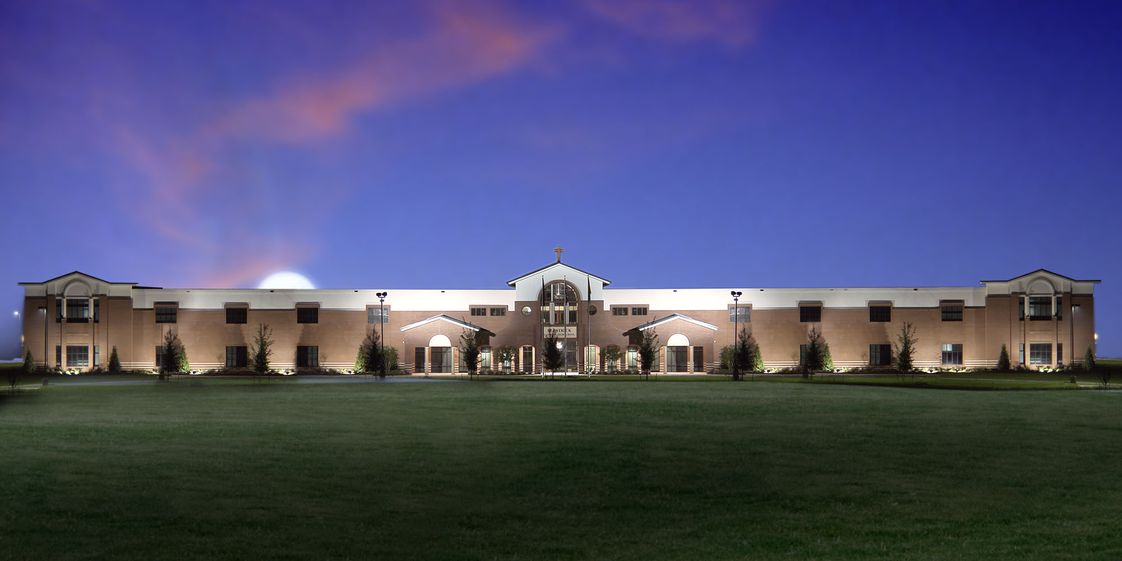

Location
- 18300 St. Patrick Road; Biloxi, (Harrison County), Mississippi 39532; United States; 30°33′10″N 89°1′19″W

Information
- Type: Private, Coeducational
- Religious affiliation: Roman Catholic
- Patron saint: St. Patrick
- Established: 2007
- School district: Diocese of Biloxi
- Superintendent: Jennifer Broadus
- Dean: Kera Libardoni
- Principal: Dr. Pam Pannell
- Grades: 7–12
- Gender: Coeducational
- Colors: Navy blue, Green, and Gold
- Athletics conference: MHSAA 3A
- Team name: Fighting Irish
- Rival: Sacred Heart High School (Hattiesburg, Mississippi)
- Accreditation: Southern Association of Colleges and Schools
- Tuition: Approximately $7,500
- Affiliation: National Catholic Educational Association
- Website: www.stpatrickhighschool.net

St. Patrick Catholic High School is a private, Roman Catholic high school in Biloxi, Mississippi. It is located in the Roman Catholic Diocese of Biloxi. The school began as a merger between Mercy Cross High School in Biloxi and St. John High School in Gulfport which were both heavily affected by Hurricane Katrina.

== Background ==
St. Patrick Catholic High School opened August 13, 2007. The first Catholic high school in Biloxi was Sacred Heart Academy which opened in 1875 as a co-educational school. In 1942 it was decided to open a separate school for boys. This school was named Notre Dame High School. In 1980 it was decided to bring the students back together into one school. This school was named Mercy Cross after the Mercy nuns who opened Sacred Heart High School and the Holy Cross brothers who opened Notre Dame High School.

The first Catholic high school in Gulfport was St. Francis de Sales High School which opened in 1901 and was later renamed St. John High School.

In 2007 the schools in Biloxi and Gulfport came together when Mercy Cross High School in Biloxi and St. John High School in Gulfport combined into St. Patrick Catholic High School.

== Recognition ==
- St. Patrick Catholic High School was named the best Catholic High School in the state of Mississippi by Niche in 2019 and has held that honor since in 2020 and 2021.
- In 2019, St. Patrick Catholic High School was added to the U.S. Department of Education's list of Blue Ribbon Schools.
- St. Patrick Catholic High School has been recognized by Niche as having a "C" rating for diversity, as well as recognizing in polling that on average, two-thirds of students feel safe at the school, and half feel happy. 89.5% of the school is white. Niche also recognizes that just over one-third of the school student body believes that "kids at this school are friendly," and words that come to mind for students include "Conservative, close-minded, diverse, friendly, unhappy, and unique," with "conservative" coming up in 29% of student responses, and the rest at 14%.

== Athletics and Activities ==
St. Patrick is a member of the Mississippi High School Activities Association and competes at the 2A level. The school's consistently strong athletic program has won 41 state championships since its founding in 2007. Currently the school provides students with opportunities to participate in:

- Band
- Basketball
- Baseball
- Cheer – State Champions 2008
- Cross Country – State Champions (Men) 2017, 2018, 2020 (Women) 2007, 2009, 2010, 2011, 2012, 2015, 2016, 2018, 2019, 2020
- Dance – State Champions 2007, 2008, 2009, 2010, 2011, 2024
- Football
- Golf – State Champions (Men) 2008, 2009, 2012, 2013, 2014 (Women) 2009, 2010, 2011, 2012
- Powerlifting
- Soccer – State Champions (Men) 2014, 2016, 2017
- Softball – State Champions 2012, 2013, 2014, 2018
- Swim
- Tennis
- Track – State Champions (Men) 2021 (Women) 2010, 2011, 2018, 2019, 2021
- Volleyball

== Controversy ==
- Sexual controversy: In 2014, a member of the St. Patrick's staff, a mathematics teacher, was arrested and escorted off campus by the Federal Bureau of Investigation due to one count each of transportation of a minor to engage in sexual activity and interstate travel with intent to engage in illicit sexual conduct with a minor. William Richard Pryor confessed to molesting eight boys from 1973 to 2005 while they were students at Bayou View Middle School. Pryor was sent to prison in March 2015 to serve 10 years on one count each of transportation of a minor to engage in sexual activity and interstate travel with intent to engage in illicit sexual conduct with a minor. Pryor filed for compassionate release for health reasons in October 2021, but it was denied, though in exchange for his plea in the case, prosecutors dismissed two other charges. Pryor was released from the low-security federal prison in Beaumont, Texas at age 77, on Feb. 25, 2023. He will remain on probation for three years after his release and must register as a convicted sex offender for the rest of his life.
- Racial controversy: In 2016, a photo circulated of a member of the St. Patrick's softball team in the dugout during a game wearing a monkey mask, insinuating racist intent. The school opened an investigation and found no wrongdoing. "The whole idea behind it is to get them fired up and have fun in the dugout. I honestly from the bottom of my heart do not believe that it was the intent of that student to offend anyone," said Matthew Buckley, principal. In contrast, racist behavior, including "calling them [the] Philadelphia team and crowd apes, monkeys and the N-word." Superintendent Mike Ladner responded to these allegations by stating that it is standard behavior for students to wear animal masks in the dugouts, even going so far as to have named it "The Zoo."

The response provided by the Superintendent contradicts what the school principal said, with the Superintendent saying the team simply calls its dugout "The Zoo," while in contrast, the principal stated that the team was hosting a themed event, and different members were wearing different masks. "Buckley said the team chose the theme "The Zoo" and was emulating other SEC college teams that wear masks and props during games." Dr. Buckley also argues that the allegations of racist remarks were untrue, as they were not reported to the opposing team's coach. The remarks were reported to news agencies.

- Staff Turnover of 2023: Dr. Matt Buckley served as principal starting in 2016 but suddenly resigned March 16, 2023 for unnamed reasons. Buckley was set to become superintendent for the Diocese of Biloxi prior to his resignation. Trey Bailey, the director of athletics, was chosen as interim principal after Buckley's exit. This event is similar to Bobby Trosclair's exit in 2012. Trosclair served as principal from its opening in 2007 but suddenly resigned from the position on January 11, 2012 for unnamed reasons. After his resignation, Trosclair was replaced by Renee McDaniel. Dr. Matt Buckley was vice principal from June 2013 to 2016. Anthony Gruich replaced Dr. Buckely as vice principal in 2016, until suddenly being dismissed March 16, 2023, for unnamed reasons. Gruich sent letters to student's parents after his dismissal, declaring his plans to appeal to the Diocesan Council to be reinstated to his position at St. Patrick, adding that he would take his case to court if needed. Gruich also requested that the letter be spread publicly to raise awareness of his situation.

March 23. 2023

Dear St. Patrick Parent,

I hope this letter finds you well. Due to the disrespectful manner in which I was terminated on March 16, I wasn't afforded the proper opportunity to tell everyone how much I have enjoyed serving your family. It's been my joy, pleasure and privilege to share this journey of education. For clarification, I did nothing wrong. In the seven years I have worked at St. Patrick I have never received a letter of reprimand or a conference of reprimand from Bishop Kinheman, Superintendent Ladner, Superintendent Clark, Assistant Superintendent Allen, School Pastor Ryan McCoy or Dr. Matt Buckley. I was completely shocked by my immediate termination and have suffered emotional distress, physical health concerns and financial turmoil. I don't read Facebook but my wife and daughters do and the depths of cruelty from speculation due to my unfair termination by the Diocese has caused them many tears, much sadness and great anger. I am sorry I chose to work at an institution that would cause them such emotional distress. Hopefully this letter will diminish the speculation and pain caused by the unfounded speculation on Facebook. I never in my wildest dreams would have thought the Catholic Diocese of Biloxi would treat me this way, especially after all I have done to make St. Patrick successful. I have been cast aside as if my professional performance did not contribute to the enrollment increasing from 370 to 650 with a waiting list. The only difference between the enrollment when it was 370 and the enrollment at 650 with a waiting list was the presence of myself and Dr. Buckley. I have requested my due process hearing with the Diocesan Council and plan to exhaust all efforts to identify and address those that have wronged me within diocesan policy and through the courts. I don't expect much from the Diocesan Council as Dr. Ladner has informed me I will not be allowed legal counsel, I will not be allowed to cross examine my accusers and the session will be held in executive session to maintain secrecy. I am authorizing the Diocese to make this Diocesan Council hearing public as I have nothing to hide and I am not fearful of anything that will be said about me. There simply does not exist any documentation of wrong doing that has been provided to me in my seven years of employment at St. Patrick. I have spent my entire professional life, thirty five years, working with children and I have never been accused of any impropriety. Many of my friends at St. Patrick are fearful to reach out to me for fear of immediate termination which I understand as they may be terminated without cause at any time as this is stated multiple times in their contract.

If you want to know how I performed at St. Patrick, simply ask your children. Ask them who greeted them every morning?

Ask them who they saw in the hallways and who spent every lunch with them? Ask them who demanded reverence and respect at Mass? Ask them who would they go to if they felt they were being treated unfairly? Ask them who on a daily basis mentioned the importance of kindness and closed every student body delivery with a reminder to "never miss an opportunity to be kind? Ask them who asked them about their extra curricular activities and attended their games? Not just the major sports but the swim meets, the tennis matches, the wrestling matches. I have received numerous recognitions over my thirty five years including being named administrator of the year twice by my previous employer but none of this is as important as what students say about me. Ask them.

In closing, I will quote from an article on Catholic Moral Theology.

If the Catholic Church is to fulfill its mission in the world, it should take its own advice and be sure the church itself is a good employer. If the Church's own employment practices are unjust and degrading to workers and create a climate of fear with threat of termination at anytime without cause and without authentic due process. the church suffers and the people to whom the church ministers suffer. If you want to attract and keep the best co-workers in the vineyard of the Lord, treat them with justice and dignity.

As for me I will follow Deuteronomy 31:6 "Be strong and courageous. Do not be afraid or terrified because of them, for the Lord your God goes with you; he will never leave you or forsake you"

Lastly, since I was unable to access all parental emails you may distribute or post this letter as you see necessary, so all may know how much I truly enjoyed working with your children and how much I will miss them everyday. Know my prayers are with you.

God Bless,

Anthony Gruich

The Catholic Diocese of Biloxi put out a press release on March 16, 2023 stating that Buckley was "immediately resigning as principal of St. Patrick Catholic High School and from any diocesan boards and committees on which he serves", and also reinforcing that Buckley was not taking the superintendent position, leaving Mike Ladner, the current interim superintendent of Catholic Schools to continue until a new superintendent was found. Orin Eleuterius, a social studies teacher that retired from the school the previous year after teaching there for 14 years, was named interim dean of students on March 20, 2023. The new superintendent, Jennifer Broadus, is supported by Bishop Kihneman. “Her years of dedication to our Catholic school students, families, faculty and staff members while serving as teacher and as principal speak well of her abilities,” said Kihneman in a statement. Paul Knapstein, a Gulf Coast resident with "more than 30 years of experience in education," was selected in early 2023 to replace Dr. Buckley at the beginning of the 2023-24 school year prior to Dr. Buckely taking his position as the new superintendent for the Diocese of Biloxi.
