= St. John High School (Gulfport, Mississippi) =

Coordinates: 30.3893642°N 89.0622589°W

- Gulfport, Mississippi

Information
- Type: Private, Coeducational
- Religious affiliation: Roman Catholic
- Established: 1900
- Closed: 2007
- Grades: 7-12

St. John High School was a private, Roman Catholic high school in Gulfport, Mississippi. It was located in the Roman Catholic Diocese of Biloxi.

== Background ==
St. John High School was founded in 1900. It was replaced by St. Patrick Catholic High School in Biloxi in August, 2007.

== Notable alumni ==
- Steven Palazzo, U.S. House Representative for Mississippi's 4th Congressional District
