= Pascagoula River High Rise Bridge =

- Coordinates: 30°22′20″N 88°33′45″W
- Carries: 8 lanes of US 90
- Crosses: East Branch Pascagoula River
- Locale: Gautier and Pascagoula, Mississippi
- Maintained by: MDOT

Characteristics
- Total length: 249.9

History
- Opened: June 23, 2003

Location
- Interactive map of Pascagoula River High Rise Bridge

The Pascagoula River High Rise Bridge is a bridge in the U.S. state of Mississippi which carries U.S. Route 90 over the East Branch of the Pascagoula River between Gautier and Pascagoula. The bridge opened on June 23, 2003 as a replacement for 4-lane drawbridge. Senator Trent Lott and state Highway Commissioner Wayne Brown were the first people to ride across the bridge.
