= Stephen Peterman =

American football player (born 1982)

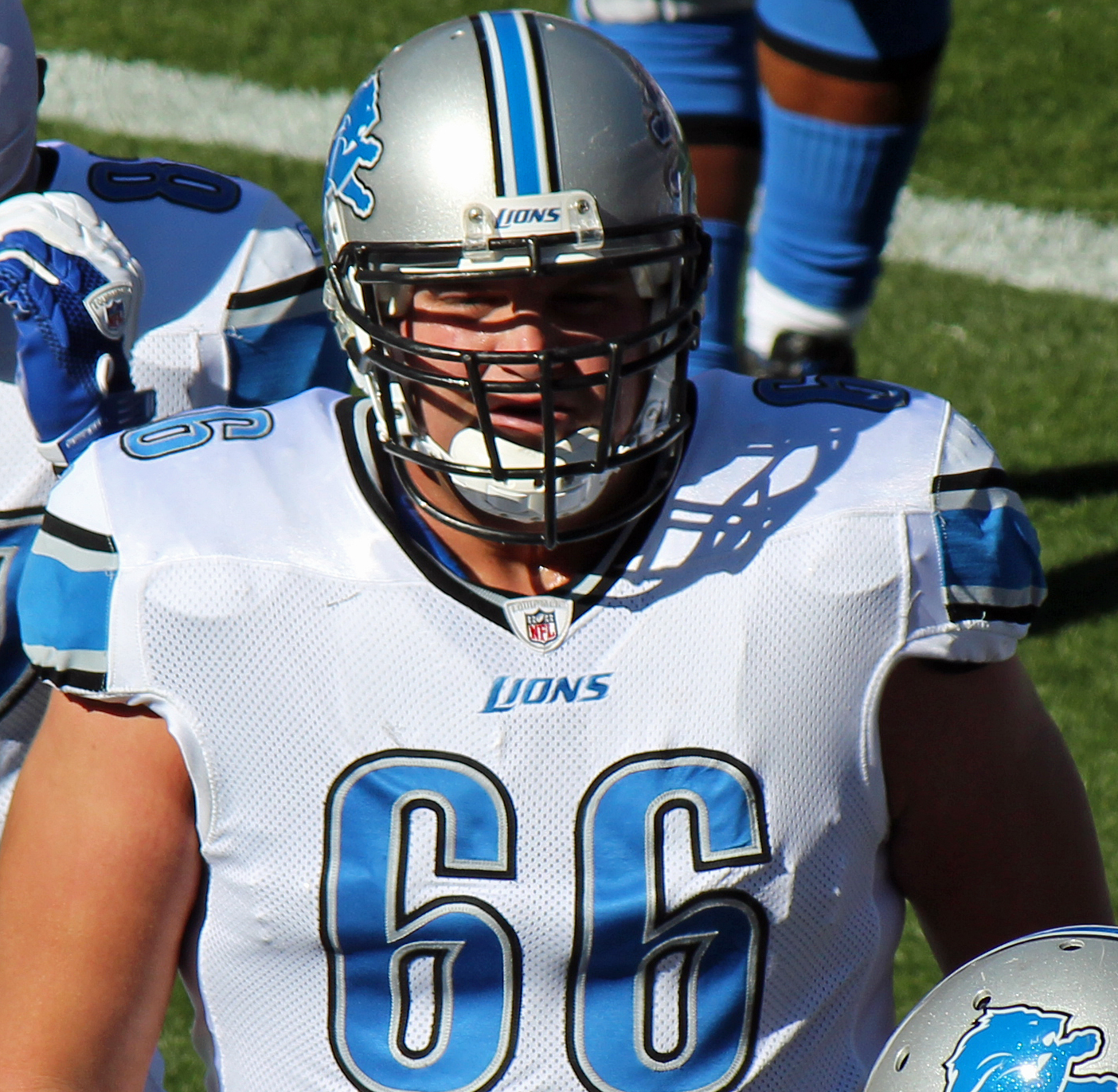

No. 72, 66
- Position: Guard

Personal information
- Born: January 11, 1982 (age 44); Gulfport, Mississippi, U.S.
- Listed height: 6 ft 4 in (1.93 m)
- Listed weight: 323 lb (147 kg)

Career information
- High school: Saint Stanislaus (MS)
- College: LSU
- NFL draft: 2004: 3rd round, 83rd overall pick

Career history
- Dallas Cowboys (2004–2005); Detroit Lions (2006–2012); New York Jets (2013)*
- * Offseason or practice squad member only

Awards and highlights
- BCS national champion (2003); First-team All-American (2003); 2× First-team All-SEC (2002, 2003)

Career NFL statistics
- Games played: 90
- Games started: 86
- Stats at Pro Football Reference

Stephen Frederick Peterman (born January 11, 1982) is an American former professional football player who was a guard in the National Football League (NFL) for the Dallas Cowboys and Detroit Lions. He played college football for the LSU Tigers.

== Early life ==
Peterman attended Saint Stanislaus College in Bay St. Louis, Mississippi, where he was an All-state and a two-time All-district selection at tight end. As a senior, he posted 14 receptions for 150 yards and one touchdown. He also lettered in basketball.

He accepted a football scholarship from Louisiana State University. As a freshman, he was converted into a defensive end, appearing in 5 games and making 8 tackles (3 for loss) as a backup.

As a sophomore, he was converted into a left guard, starting 12 games and allowing only one sack. As a junior, he again allowed one sack. As a senior, he was moved to right guard and allowed one sack.

He started 35 out of his 48 career games (25 starts at left guard) and was a part of the 2003 national championship team.

== Professional career ==
=== Dallas Cowboys ===
Peterman was selected by the Dallas Cowboys in the third round (83rd overall) of the 2004 NFL draft. As a rookie, he broke a finger at the start of training camp, before tearing the ACL and MCL of his right knee in the last game of the pre-season (while playing special teams), which placed him on the injured reserve list on September 3.

In 2005, he played 3 games on special teams at the end of the season. The team tried him at center before releasing him on August 23, 2006.

Peterman was part of a string of unsuccessful offensive lineman selections made by the Cowboys in the first rounds of the draft: Al Johnson (2003), Jacob Rogers (2004). He struggled with injuries during his two years with the Cowboys.

=== Detroit Lions ===
On October 17, 2006, the Detroit Lions signed him to their practice squad and was activated for the last three games (2 starts) of the year. He became the team's starting right guard in 2007. The next year, he was inactive in 2 games because of a hand injury.

In 2009, the Lions signed him to a five-year contract. He was placed on the injured reserve list on November 20, with a right ankle injury he suffered playing against the Minnesota Vikings.

On February 5, 2013, he was waived after having problems the previous year in pass protection.

=== New York Jets ===
On April 26, 2013, Peterman agreed to a one-year contract with the New York Jets. He was released on August 26.
