= Our Lady Academy =

Location
- 222 South Beach Boulevard; Bay St. Louis, (Hancock County), Mississippi 39520; United States; 30°18′30″N 89°19′45″W

Information
- Type: Private, All-Girls
- Religious affiliation: Roman Catholic
- Established: 1971; 55 years ago
- Founder: Mother Catherine McAuley
- President: Sister Jackie Howard
- Principal: Marilyn Pigott
- Grades: 7–12
- Age range: 12–18
- Colors: Maroon and Silver
- Mascot: Crescent
- Nickname: OLA
- Team name: Crescents
- Rival: St. Patrick's Catholic High School
- Accreditation: Southern Association of Colleges and Schools
- Publication: From Within (Literary Magazine)
- Newspaper: Maroon Tribune
- Yearbook: Tomorrow's Past
- Affiliation: National Catholic Educational Association
- Athletic Director: Emily Corley
- Website: http://www.ourladyacademy.com

Our Lady Academy (OLA) is a private, Roman Catholic, all-girls high school in Bay St. Louis, Mississippi. It is located in the Roman Catholic Diocese of Biloxi. It is the only all-female Catholic school in Mississippi.

== Background ==
Our Lady Academy was established in 1971 by the Sisters of Mercy at the same location as a previous all-girls high school, St. Joseph Academy, which operated from 1855 (171 years ago) to 1967 (59 years ago). St. Joseph Academy closed after it was severely damaged by Hurricane Betsy in 1965. There was talk of reopening St. Joseph Academy until Hurricane Camille hit in 1969.

Our Lady Academy is an exceptional school that excels in education, standardized test scores, and athletics. The relatively small campus, consisting of only a few buildings and a gym, is located on the beach of Bay St. Louis. OLA's mascot is the Crescent and the teams are known as "The Crescents." The Our Lady Academy soccer team has won 7 state titles in recent years for the 1A/2A/3A division. The volleyball team has many state titles to their name as well.

Our Lady Academy was severely damaged by Hurricane Katrina. Classes resumed two months after the storm, sharing resources with nearby all-boys Saint Stanislaus College. The motto for the two schools after Hurricane Katrina was "Two Schools, One Spirit."
