= Resurrection High School (Mississippi) =

Location
- 520 Watts Avenue; Pascagoula, (Jackson County), Mississippi 39567; United States; 30°21′57″N 88°33′37″W

Information
- Type: Private, Coeducational
- Religious affiliation: Roman Catholic
- Established: 1882
- Grades: 9–12
- Colors: Blue and Gold
- Team name: Eagles
- Accreditation: Southern Association of Colleges and Schools
- Affiliation: National Catholic Educational Association
- Website: http://www.rcseagles.com

Resurrection High School is a private, Roman Catholic high school in Pascagoula, Mississippi. It is located in the Roman Catholic Diocese of Biloxi.

== History ==
The school was founded as the Academy of the Guardian Angels on October 6, 1882, by five Sisters of Perpetual Adoration with an initial enrolment of 47 students. By 1888, the Catholic population of Pascagoula had grown to 1,000 people. The first commencement exercises were held in 1889, wherein three students graduated.

In 1932, the Sisters of Perpetual Adoration officially changed the name of their religious order to the Sisters of the Most Holy Sacrament.

In 1937, Our Lady of Victories (as the school was now called) received certification by the State of Mississippi. A new school building was erected in 1947. The gymnasium was added in 1956. In 1959, a new grammar school was erected. In 1964, Sacred Heart Elementary School was dedicated and opened.

In 1967, the high school became inter‑parochial with all area parishes assuming responsibility for its direction. In 1974, due to declining numbers, the Most Holy Sacrament Sisters relinquished leadership of the school. The Sisters formally withdrew in 1988, the same year that Bishop Howze announced the merger of OLV Central High School, OLV Elementary, and Sacred Heart Elementary School into one school system, Resurrection Catholic School.

== Ranking ==
It has been ranked 8th out of 9 schools in the category of best Catholic high schools in Mississippi.
