= Theodore Brune =

German-American architect

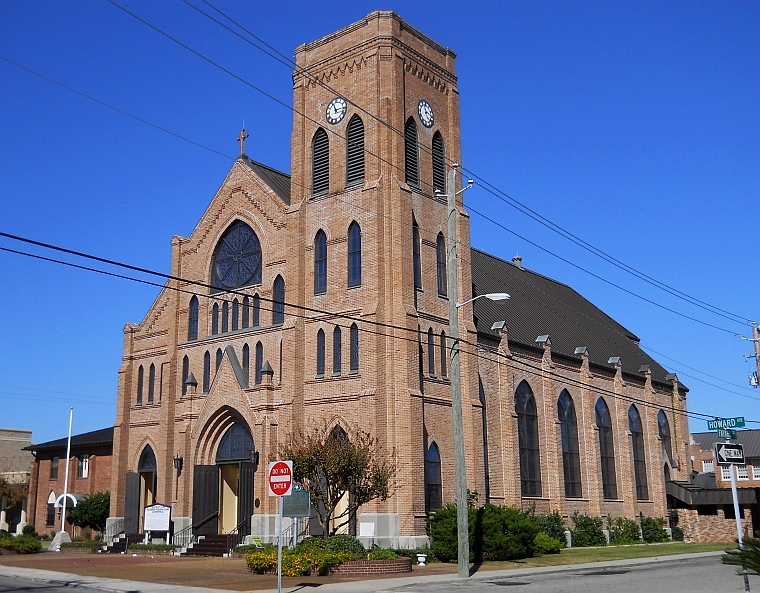
Cathedral of the Nativity of the Blessed Virgin Mary in Biloxi, Mississippi

Theodore "Theo" Brune (born 1854 - died 1932) was a German-American architect in Biloxi, Mississippi. He designed many churches on the Gulf Coast of Louisiana and in Mississippi including the Cathedral of the Nativity of the Blessed Virgin Mary at 870 West Howard Avenue in Biloxi.

Brune was born in Hanover, Germany in 1854 and studied at University of Tübingen, Germany. He immigrated to the United States in 1886.

Brune designed several churches along the Gulf Coast of Louisiana. His Gothic design for the Blessed Virgin Mother Catholic Church on West Howard Avenue in Biloxi Mississippi was constructed after the original church was destroyed by the Great Biloxi Fire of November 1900 on the same site. In early 1906, stained glass windows were donated by Julia Dulion Lopez (1857-1918) in memory of her late husband. Frederick Thornley of New York was employed to install the windows designed and built by Reis and Reis of Munich, Germany.

Brune died in New Orleans on March 8, 1932 at 1303 3rd Street. His body was taken to St. Joseph’s Abbey north of Covington, Louisiana for burial.

== Work by Brune ==
- St. Joseph’s rectory and convent (1908) at Bay St. Louis, Mississippi
- Mater Dolorosa Catholic Church (1909) in New Orleans, Louisiana
- St. Michael the Archangel Catholic Church (1911) in Crowley, Louisiana
- St Jane de Chantal Church in Abita Springs, Louisiana
- Catholic Church and convent in Madisonville, Louisiana
- St. Joseph’s Abbey Church (1931) in St. Benedict, Louisiana.
- St. Joseph Catholic Church (1908) in Greenville, Mississippi
- St. Mary of False River (1907) in New Roads, Louisiana
