= Thomas John Rodi =

American prelate of the Catholic Church (born 1949)

His Excellency, The Most Reverend Thomas John Rodi
- Archbishop Emeritus of Mobile
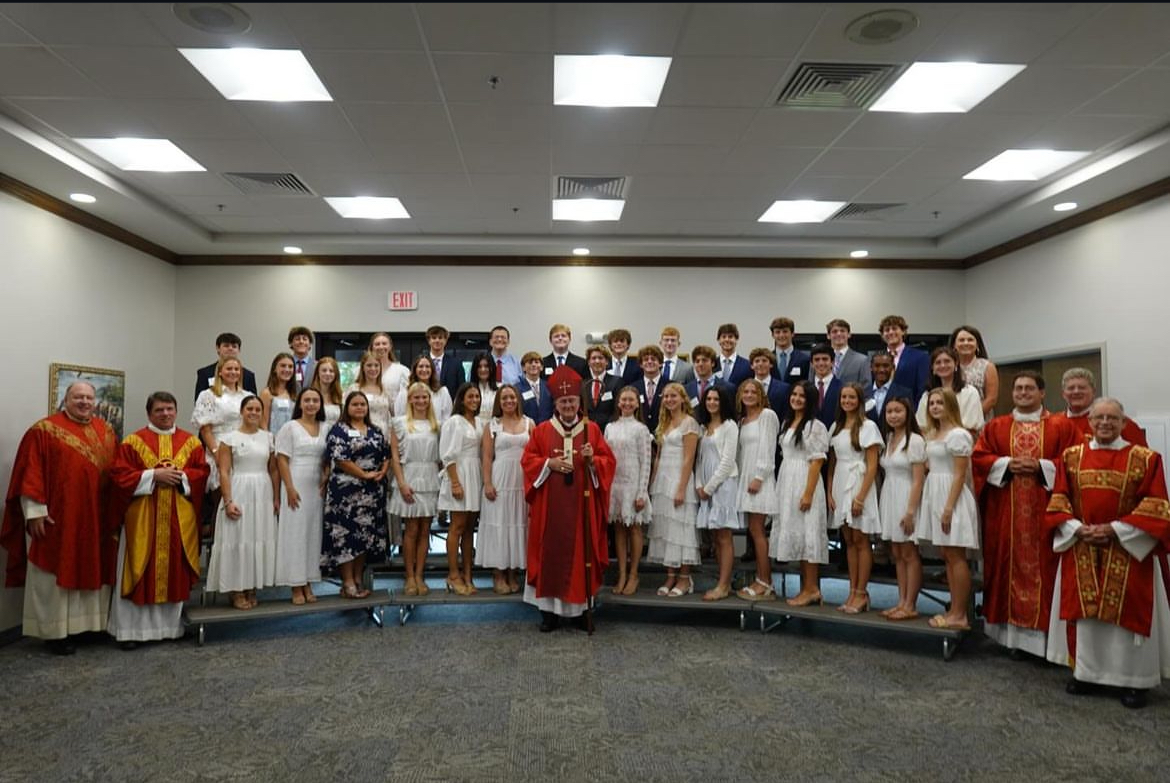
- Archbishop Rodi with Christ the King’s 2025 confirmation class.
- Archdiocese: Mobile
- Appointed: April 2, 2008
- Installed: June 6, 2008
- Retired: July 1, 2025
- Predecessor: Oscar Hugh Lipscomb
- Successor: Mark Steven Rivituso
- Previous post: Bishop of Biloxi (2001–2008)

Orders
- Ordination: May 20, 1978 by Philip Matthew Hannan
- Consecration: July 2, 2001 by Oscar Hugh Lipscomb, Francis B. Schulte, and Joseph Lawson Howze

Personal details
- Born: March 27, 1949 (age 77) New Orleans, Louisiana, US
- Motto: Caritas Christi urget nos (The love of Christ compels us)

Styles of Thomas John Rodi
- Reference style: His Excellency; The Most Reverend
- Spoken style: Your Excellency
- Religious style: Archbishop emeritus

Thomas John Rodi (born March 27, 1949) is an American Catholic prelate who served as Archbishop of Mobile from 2008 to 2025. He previously served as Bishop of Biloxi from 2001 to 2008.

== Biography ==
=== Early life ===
Thomas Rodi was born on March 27, 1949, in New Orleans, Louisiana. He graduated from De La Salle High School in New Orleans in 1967. He attended Georgetown University in Washington, D.C., obtaining his Bachelor of Arts degree in 1971. He returned to New Orleans and earned a Juris Doctor degree from Tulane University Law School in 1974. He then entered Notre Dame Seminary in New Orleans and received his Master of Divinity degree in 1978.

=== Work as a priest ===
Rodi was ordained to the priesthood for the Archdiocese of New Orleans by Archbishop Philip Matthew Hannan on May 20, 1978. After his ordination, the archdiocese assigned Rodi as associate pastor at St. Ann Parish and at St. Christopher the Martyr Parish, both in Metairie, Louisiana, and at St. Agnes Parish in Jefferson, Louisiana.

Rodi was named a judge for the metropolitan tribunal of the archdiocese in 1983. He was then sent to Washington D.C. to study at the Catholic University of America School of Canon Law. He earned his licentiate in canon law in 1986. The archdiocese then placed Rodi on the faculty of Notre Dame Seminary to teach taught canon law until 1995. He held a number of offices in the archdiocesan administration, including director of the Office of Religious Education from 1988 to 1989 and director of the Department of Pastoral Services from 1989 to 1996.

Archbishop Francis B. Schulte named Rodi as chancellor of the archdiocese in 1992. That same year, the Vatican elevated him to the rank of honorary prelate. Schulte named Rodi as his vicar general and moderator of the curia in 1996. For a time he was also pastor of St. Rita Parish in New Orleans.

=== Bishop of Biloxi ===
On May 15, 2001, Pope John Paul II appointed Rodi as bishop of Biloxi. Rodi received his episcopal consecration on July 2, 2001, in the Cathedral of the Nativity of the Blessed Virgin Mary, from Archbishop Oscar Lipscomb, with Archbishop Francis Schulte and Bishop Joseph Howze serving as co-consecrators. Rodi selected as his episcopal motto: Caritas Christi Urget Nos, 2 Cor 5:14, meaning, "The love of Christ compels us." Rodi was only the second bishop of Biloxi, a diocese erected in 1977.

=== Archbishop of Mobile ===
Pope Benedict XVI named Rodi as archbishop of Mobile on April 2, 2008, replacing Bishop Oscar Lipscomb. Rodi was installed there on June 6, 2008. He was the second archbishop of Mobile, a diocese named an archdiocese in 1980. Rodi joined the board of Cross Catholic Outreach, an international relief agency, in 2010 and chaired its board from 2011 to 2020.

In 2018, Rodi, on his own initiative, released a report of all clergy and religious in the archdiocese who had been credibly accused of sexual misconduct since 1950. It provided the names and further information about 12 diocesan clergymen and 17 members of religious orders.

In July 2023, Rodi announced that the 30-year-old priest Alex Crow had left Alabama for Italy with an 18-year-old girl, a recent graduate of McGill-Toolen Catholic High School. No crime was alleged but Rodi notified police, citing "the circumstances of his departure". Rodi suspended Crow from ministry: "he may no longer exercise ministry as a priest, nor to tell people he is a priest, nor to dress as a priest." Police closed their investigation because the young woman refused to cooperate. Crow later requested laicization from the Vatican and it was granted in January 2024.

=== Retirement ===
Pope Leo XIV accepted Rodi's resignation as archbishop of Mobile on July 1, 2025.

Catholic Church titles
Preceded by Oscar Hugh Lipscomb	Archbishop of Mobile; 2008–2025	Succeeded by Mark S. Rivituso
Preceded by Joseph Lawson Howze	Bishop of Biloxi; 2001–2008	Succeeded by Roger Morin
