= Joseph Lawson Howze =

American Catholic bishop (1923–2019)

His Excellency, The Most Reverend Joseph Lawson E. Howze
- Bishop of Biloxi; Titular Bishop of Maxita
- Archdiocese: Mobile
- Diocese: Biloxi
- Appointed: March 8, 1977
- Installed: June 6, 1977
- Term ended: May 15, 2001
- Predecessor: First Bishop
- Successor: Thomas John Rodi
- Previous post: Auxiliary Bishop of Natchez-Jackson (1972 to 1977)

Orders
- Ordination: May 7, 1959 by Vincent Stanislaus Waters
- Consecration: January 28, 1973 by Luigi Raimondi, Harold Robert Perry, and Joseph Bernard Brunini

Personal details
- Born: August 30, 1923 Daphne, Alabama, U.S.
- Died: January 9, 2019 (aged 95) Ocean Springs, Mississippi, U.S.
- Motto: Unity of God’s people

Styles of Joseph Lawson E. Howze
- Reference style: His Excellency; The Most Reverend
- Spoken style: Your Excellency
- Religious style: Bishop

Joseph Lawson Edward Howze (born Lawson Edward Howze; August 30, 1923 – January 9, 2019) was an American Catholic prelate who served as the first Bishop of Biloxi from 1977 to 2001. He was the first Black Catholic ordinary of a U.S. Catholic diocese. Howze previously served as auxiliary bishop for the Diocese of Natchez-Jackson from 1972 to 1977.

== Early life ==
Joseph Howze was born on August 30, 1923, in Daphne, Alabama. He was the oldest of four children of Albert Otis Howze Sr. and Helen Lawson Howze. His mother died when he was five. He had six siblings in total. He grew up with neighbors who were Catholic and attributed his Catholicism to that influence.

Howze attended kindergarten at Most Pure Heart of Mary School in Mobile, Alabama. He was later transferred to the segregated public schools of Mobile, graduating from Mobile County Secondary School in 1944. Howze originally aspired to become a doctor and studied chemistry, biology, and physics. He graduated from Alabama State Branch Junior College, now known as Bishop State Community College, in Mobile in 1946. In 1948, he earned a Bachelor of Arts degree from Alabama State University in Montgomery, Alabama.

Howze converted to Catholicism in 1948, taking the name baptismal name of Joseph. He later entered the seminary for the Josephites, studying at Epiphany Apostolic College in New Windsor, New York. He then taught science in the public school system and was later hired to teach at St. Monica School in Tulsa, Oklahoma, in 1952.

After expressing a renewed interest in the priesthood, Howze was accepted to study for the priesthood at Christ the King Seminary at St. Bonaventure University in St. Bonaventure, New York. He received his Doctor of Divinity degree there in 1959.

== Priesthood ==
Howze was ordained to the priesthood for the Diocese of Raleigh at the Cathedral of the Sacred Heart in Raleigh, North Carolina, by Bishop Vincent Stanislaus Waters on May 7, 1959. Howze later served as a pastor at St. Teresa of Ávila Catholic Church in Durham, North Carolina and at a parish in Asheville, North Carolina.

== Auxiliary Bishop of Natchez-Jackson ==
On November 8, 1972, Howze was appointed auxiliary bishop of Natchez-Jackson and titular bishop of Maxita by Pope Paul VI. He was consecrated at the Jackson Municipal Hall in Jackson, Mississippi, on January 28, 1973, by Archbishop Luigi Raimondi, with Bishops Harold R. Perry and Joseph Brunini serving as co-consecrators.

== Bishop of Biloxi ==
When Paul VI erected the Diocese of Biloxi on March 1, 1977, he named Howze as its first bishop. He was the first openly Black bishop to head a diocese in the United States.

Howze retired as bishop of Biloxi on June 6, 2001. He died on January 9, 2019, in Ocean Springs, Mississippi, at the age of 95.

== See also ==
- Catholic Church hierarchy
- Catholic Church in the United States
- Historical list of the Catholic bishops of the United States
- List of Catholic bishops of the United States
- Lists of patriarchs, archbishops, and bishops

== Episcopal succession ==
Catholic Church titles
Preceded by First Bishop	Bishop of Biloxi; 1977–2001	Succeeded by Thomas John Rodi
Preceded by -	Auxiliary Bishop of Natchez-Jackson; 1973–1977	Succeeded by -
