= Saint Stanislaus College =

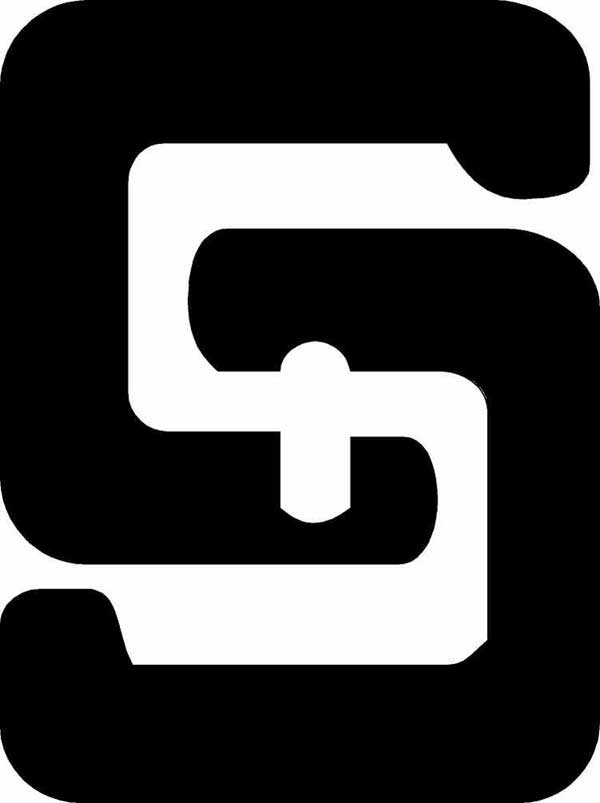

Location
- 304 South Beach Boulevard; Bay St. Louis, (Hancock County), Mississippi 39520; United States; 30°18′24″N 89°19′44″W

Information
- Type: Private, Day & Boarding school
- Motto: "Men of Character"
- Religious affiliations: Brothers of the Sacred Heart, Roman Catholic
- Founded: 1854
- President: Brother Barry Landry
- Principal: Gary Blackburn
- Dean of Students: Dr. Tim Holland
- Grades: 7–12
- Gender: Boys
- Colors: Red and Black
- Mascot: Rock-a-Chaw
- Nickname: Rocks
- Team name: The Rock-a-Chaws
- Rival: Bay High
- Accreditation: Southern Association of Colleges and Schools
- Yearbook: The White Cap
- Affiliation: National Catholic Educational Association
- Alumni: 10,000+
- Athletic Director: Stace McRaney
- Campus Ministry & Student Retreats: Brother Grieves
- Website: ststan.com

St. Stanislaus College (SSC) is a Catholic day and boarding school for boys in grades 7–12. It has been owned and operated by the Brothers of the Sacred Heart order since 1854.

It is located around an hour's drive outside New Orleans in Bay Saint Louis, Mississippi. The institution is named after Saint Stanislaus Kostka, who is the Patron Saint of youth, young students, and seminarians. It takes in day and boarding students from grades 7-12. It was founded in 1854 by the Brothers of the Sacred Heart. The school mascot is the "Rock-A-Chaw."

== History ==
In 1854 the Brothers of the Sacred Heart bought land for the foundation of a boarding school. Two years previously Brothers Basile Venable, Leo Maligne, and Joseph Deimer came to Bay Saint Louis, Mississippi from France to teach in the boys' parish school fulfilling the desire of Father Stanislaus Buteux of Our Lady of the Gulf Catholic Church. In late 1854 the Father petitioned superior general of the Brothers of the Sacred Heart (Brother Polycarp) for more teachers that a boarding school could be started. In response Brothers Eusebe Gulonnier, Ephrem Flechet and George Leydier were sent.

The land bought by the brothers cost $4,000. The first school building built on this land cost $3,800. The school was named after Father Stanislaus and was placed under the protection of Saint Stanislaus Kostka. The first president of the school was Brother Athanasius.

When the Civil War erupted a few years later, some students left to join the army, but at least one student was forcibly brought back by his mother. Before the war was over, the Union army arrived in Bay Saint Louis marching down the road that ran alongside the campus, giving it its current name of Union Street.

A lawsuit was filed in federal court in 2007 by a former student named Michael D. Stevenson against St. Stanislaus College, the Brothers of the Sacred Heart and Brother William Leimbach. The suit alleges that Brother Leimbach subjected Stevenson to abuse from 1983–84, when Stevenson was 15. At least five more former students alleging sexual abuse were included in affidavits in the suit. The school denied the allegations and filed a motion to be dismissed from the case.

Saint Stanislaus College Rock-a-Chaw

== Mission ==
The mission of Saint Stanislaus, a Catholic resident and day school for young men, is to form each student to Gospel values by nurturing his spiritual, academic, and physical growth in a place of sanctuary structured to embody the charism of the Brothers of the Sacred Heart.

== Athletics ==
The Saint Stanislaus College Rock-A-Chaws field teams in baseball, basketball, cross-country, football, golf, powerlifting, sailing, soccer, swimming, tennis, and track and field. Since 2014, the Stanislaus athletic teams have won a total of ten State Championships.

== Notable clubs and organizations ==
- Band
- Cheerleading
- Drama Club
- International Club
- Key Club
- Magic Club
- Math & Science Team
- Math Club/Math Counts
- Mu Alpha Theta
- National Honor Society
- National Junior Honor Society
- Quiz Bowl
- Radio Club
- RC Club
- Robotics Club
- SCUBA
- Student Council
- Student Ministry
- Yearbook
- Environmental Club
- Service Hour Team (SHOUT)

=== Rock-a-chaw mascot ===
Rock-a-chaw comes from an old Choctaw Indian word meaning devil grass and today is also known as sandbur (Cenchrus L.). Several species are common in the area, especially coastal sandbur. "Rock-a-chaw" was the name give to the hard, spiny, globose or oval bur of the plant. It is covered with stiff spines, which stick to fur and clothing and can be quite difficult to extract. The burs can also be quite painful when landed on such as during football games. They littered the playing fields and campus before these areas were tilled and seeded with grass. During sporting events, it was not uncommon for the students to do their best to remove the many burs from the playing fields where the prickly weeds grew in the sandy soil that is common for the Gulf Coast area. Sometimes students would drag blankets made of wool across the fields. Because the rock-a-chaws had small spikes, they clung to the wool. This aided in quicker removal of the rock-a-chaws from the playing fields.

== Camp Stanislaus ==
Camp Stanislaus, founded in 1928 by the Brothers of the Sacred Heart, is a resident and day summer camp for boys and girls ages eight to fifteen. The camp hosts many different activities, including: sailing, water-skiing, archery, hobbies, kayaks, canoes, swimming, gym, tennis, basketball, pool, art, weightlifting, volleyball, marine science, bonfires, fishing, movies, soccer, barbecues, skit nights, paddle boarding, karaoke, shows, beach activities, and much more. Current director Sam Doescher earned Camp Stanislaus a spot within the American Camp Association. Under his leadership, Camp Stanislaus became co-ed, as has set record numbers for attendance.

== Notable alumni ==
- Marchmont "Marchy" Schwartz - (Class of 1927) inducted into the College Football Hall of Fame in 1974; former football coach at Stanford University; member of the 1931 College Football All-America Team; starting running back at University of Notre Dame from 1929 to 1930; was a two-time all-American under legendary football coach Knute Rockne.
- Felix "Doc" Blanchard - (Class of 1942) led the 1941 football team to an undefeated season and the Gulf Coast Championship; 1945 Heisman Trophy, Maxwell Award and James E. Sullivan Award winner (All 3 trophies are on display at St. Stanislaus); inducted into the College Football Hall of fame in 1959.
- Shelby Tucker - (Class of 1953) World traveler, adventurer, lawyer, linguist, author of books including Among Insurgents and The Last Banana, about Asia and Africa.
- Shannon Garrett - (Class of 1990) former professional Canadian football defensive back and linebacker who played fourteen seasons in the Canadian Football League. Two time Grey Cup Champion. Member of the Mississippi College Hall of Fame.
- Stephen Peterman - (Class of 2000) played in the NFL for the Dallas Cowboys and Detroit Lions.
- Jacob Lindgren - (Class of 2011) was a 2nd round pick out of Mississippi State University and played pitcher for the New York Yankees. He is currently a pitcher for the Chicago White Sox.
- Myles Brennan - (Class of 2017) was an Under Armour All-American and 6th ranked quarterback in the country. He played quarterback for the LSU Tigers.
- John Besh – American chef, TV personality, philanthropist, restaurateur and author
- Benjy Davis – Leader singer and songwriter for the Benjy Davis Project

== Hurricane Katrina ==
Hurricane Katrina had a huge impact on Saint Stanislaus and its surrounding neighborhood. Katrina destroyed many buildings, including the first floor of the main school building and dormitory. The school was closed for two months. Saint Stanislaus, along with its next door neighbor Our Lady Academy, an all-girl Biloxi diocesan Catholic school, resumed classes together on November 1, 2005, on the Saint Stanislaus campus and operated jointly for the remainder of the 2005–2006 school year. In August 2006, Our Lady Academy resumed operations on its own campus, sharing some classes with Saint Stanislaus as it had done prior to Hurricane Katrina. Since 2005, Saint Stanislaus has renovated most of its campus buildings including its famous 1,000 foot fishing pier (2010), a new band hall (2007), a new cafeteria (2010), remodeled gym (2006), remodeled rec halls, classrooms and offices (2014), remodeled dormitory (2014 and in progress), remodeled baseball and football fields (2013 & 2014), remodeled library (2015), and remodeled physics and chemistry labs (2017 & 2018).
