= Pascagoula, Mississippi =

- City
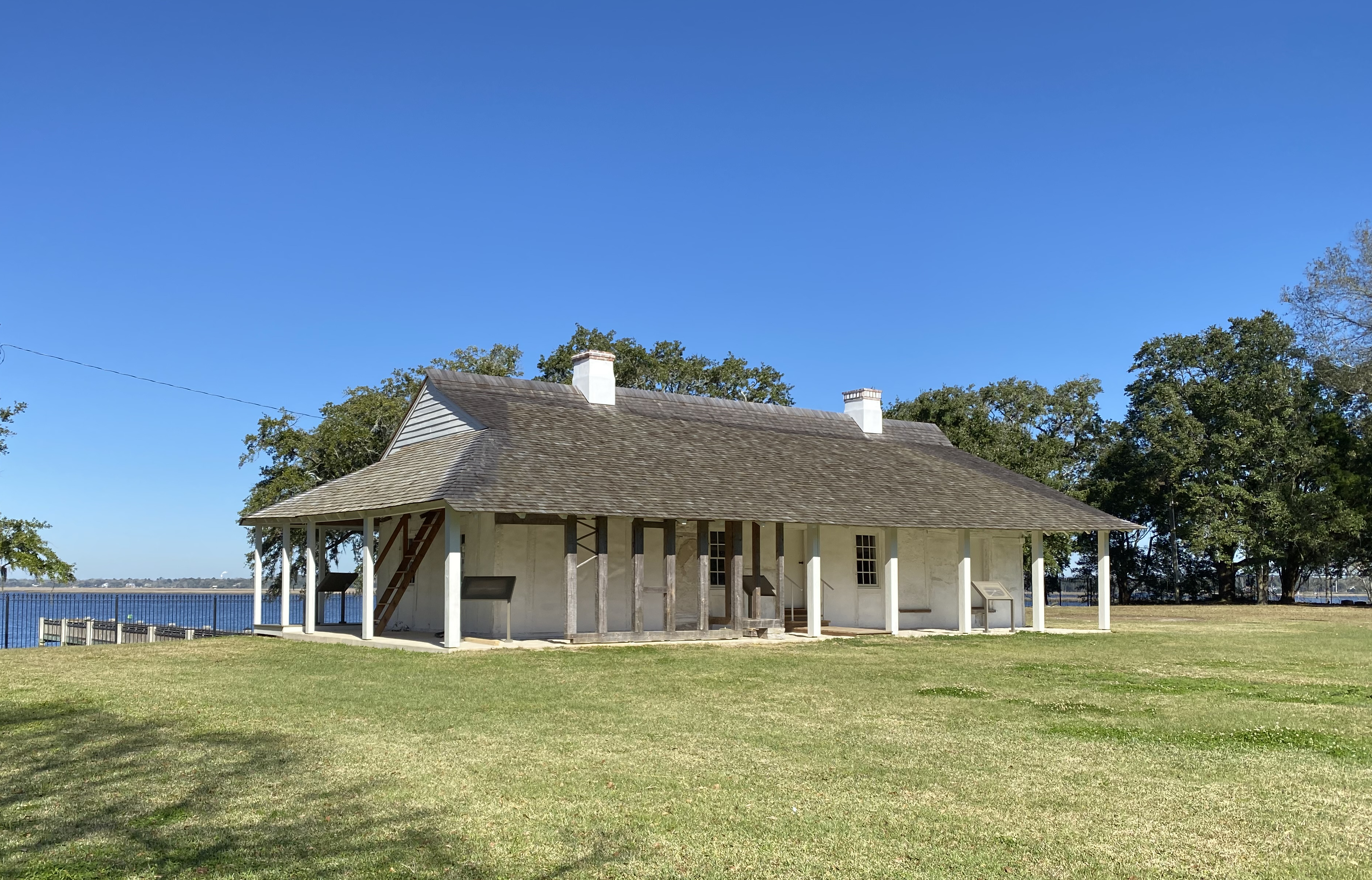
- The LaPointe-Krebs House, built c. 1757

- Flag Logo
- Nickname: Mississippi's Flagship City
- Motto: "A Great Place to Live, Work & Play"
- Interactive map of Pascagoula, Mississippi
- Location within Mississippi Location within the United States
- Coordinates: 30°21′49″N 88°32′31″W
- Country: United States
- State: Mississippi
- County: Jackson

Government
  - Mayor: Jay Willis (R)

Area
  - City: 24.51 sq mi (63.48 km^{2})
  - Land: 15.37 sq mi (39.82 km^{2})
  - Water: 9.14 sq mi (23.66 km^{2})
- Elevation: 9.8 ft (3 m)

Population (2020)
  - City: 22,010
  - Density: 1,431.4/sq mi (552.68/km^{2})
  - Urban: 50,428 (US: 497th)
  - Metro: 382,516 (US: 137th)
- Time zone: UTC−6 (Central (CST))
  - Summer (DST): UTC−5 (CDT)
- ZIP codes: 39567-39581
- Area code: 228
- FIPS code: 28-55360
- GNIS feature ID: 0675480
- Website: cityofpascagoula.com

Pascagoula (/pæskəɡulə/ PASS-kə-GOO-lə) is a city in Jackson County, Mississippi, United States, and its county seat. Its population was 22,010 at the 2020 census, down from 22,392 at the 2010 census. It is part of the Gulfport–Biloxi metropolitan area.

The two closest airports serving the city with commercial airline travel are Mobile Regional Airport, 34 miles (55 km) to the northeast in Alabama; and Gulfport-Biloxi International Airport, about 40 miles (64 km) west of Pascagoula. Amtrak train service also began serving the city when the Mardi Gras Service debuted on August 18, 2025.

== History ==
=== Early history ===
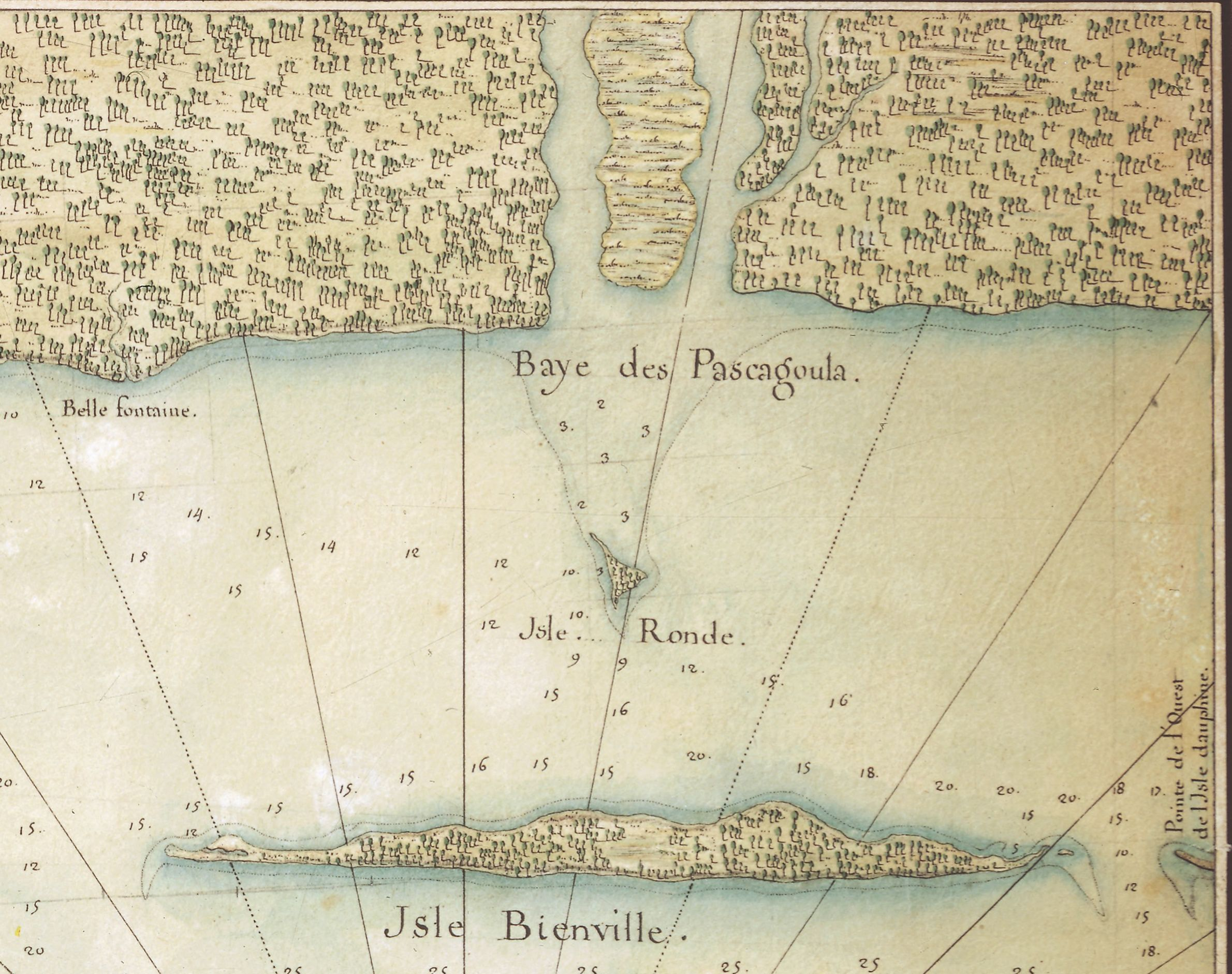
Pascagoula Bay, early 18th-century French map

The name Pascagoula, which means "bread eater", is taken from the Pascagoula, a group of Native Americans found in villages along the Pascagoula River some distance above its mouth. Hernando de Soto seems to have made the first contact with them in the 1540s, though little is known of that encounter. Pierre Le Moyne d'Iberville, founder of the colony of Louisiana, left a more detailed account from an expedition of this region in 1700.

The first detailed account comes from Jean-Baptiste Le Moyne de Bienville, younger brother of Iberville, whom the Pascagoula visited at Fort Maurepas in present-day Ocean Springs, shortly after it was settled and while the older brother was away in France. Few details are certain about these people, except that their language seemed not to have shared an etymological root with the larger native groups to the north, the Choctaw particularly, who speak a Muskogean language. Some speculation exists that their language may be related to Biloxi. The Biloxi people spoke a now-extinct Siouan language, which is related to the languages spoken by the Sioux, Crow, and Ho-Chunk.

The territory of the Biloxi people seems to have ranged from the areas of what are now called Biloxi Bay to Bayou La Batre (Alabama) and 25 miles (40 km) up the Pascagoula River, and the Pascagoula people's territory seems to have ranged between some distance north of there to the confluence of the Leaf and Chickasawhay Rivers. However, the Pascagoula language is completely undocumented; thus, genealogical affiliations from other authors are speculation.

The first European settlers of Pascagoula were Jean Baptiste Baudreau Dit Graveline, Joseph Simon De La Pointe, and his aunt, Madame Chaumont.

=== Modern history ===
The region changed hands over the next century, being occupied variously by the English, French, and Spanish until well after the American Revolutionary War. It came into the permanent possession of the United States in 1812, when it was added to the Mississippi Territory. At one point, for 74 days in 1810, Pascagoula was a part of what was known as the Republic of West Florida. Pascagoula was incorporated as a village in 1892. It obtained city status in 1901. Today's downtown Pascagoula used to be the town of Scranton, Mississippi, incorporated in 1870. The two towns merged in 1904 by governor's proclamation and in 1912 by Mississippi legislative act.

In October 1973, an alleged unidentified flying object sighting and alien abduction is said to have occurred when co-workers Charles Hickson and Calvin Parker claimed they were abducted by aliens while fishing near Pascagoula. The incident, the Pascagoula Abduction, earned substantial mass media attention. In June 2019, Pascagoula placed a historical marker near the alleged abduction site. The city honors the abduction every year during an event called Goula Palooza. The festival takes place in the downtown area of the city.

=== Hurricane Katrina ===
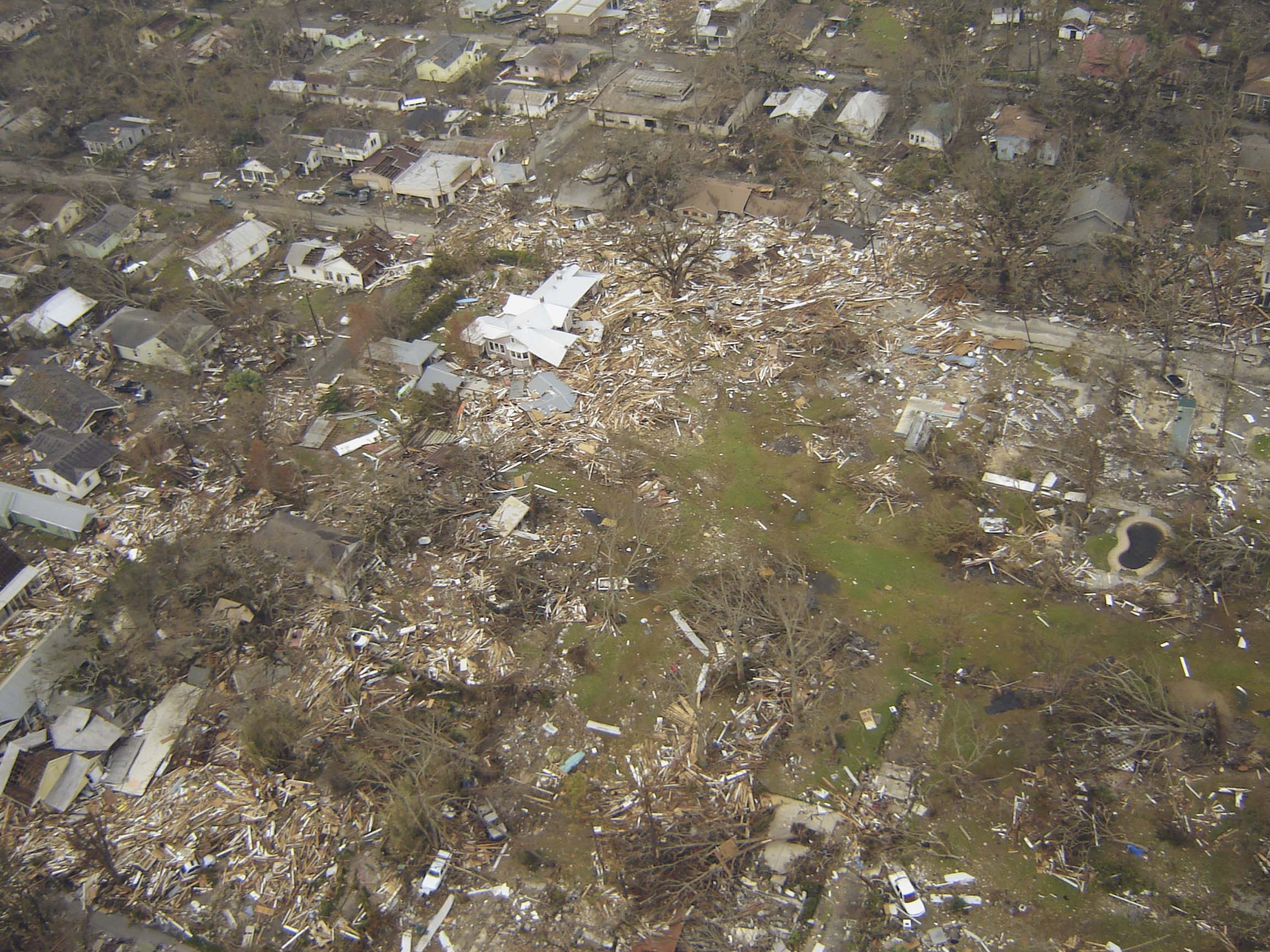
Houses destroyed or flooded by Hurricane Katrina

On August 29, 2005, Hurricane Katrina's 20-foot (6.1 m) storm surge devastated Pascagoula, much like Biloxi and Gulfport and the rest of the Mississippi Gulf Coast. Katrina came ashore during the high tide of 6:12 am, 2.1 ft (0.64 m) more than typical. Nearly 92% of Pascagoula was flooded. Most homes along Beach Boulevard were destroyed, and FEMA trailers became an omnipresent sight.

Due to the media focus on the plight of New Orleans and Biloxi-Gulfport in the aftermath of Katrina, many Pascagoula citizens have expressed feeling neglected or even forgotten following the storm. Most Pascagoula residents did not possess flood insurance, and many were required to put their homes on pilings before being given a permit to rebuild. TITANTubes, sometimes referred to as geotubes, were installed under the beach to serve as low-profile dune cores to protect the evacuation route.

United States Navy officials announced that two Arleigh Burke-class guided missile destroyers that were under construction at Northrop Grumman Ship Systems in Pascagoula had been damaged by the storm, as well as the amphibious assault ship USS Makin Island.

Hurricane Katrina damaged over 40 Mississippi libraries, flooding the Pascagoula Public Library's first floor and causing mold in the building.

== Points of interest ==
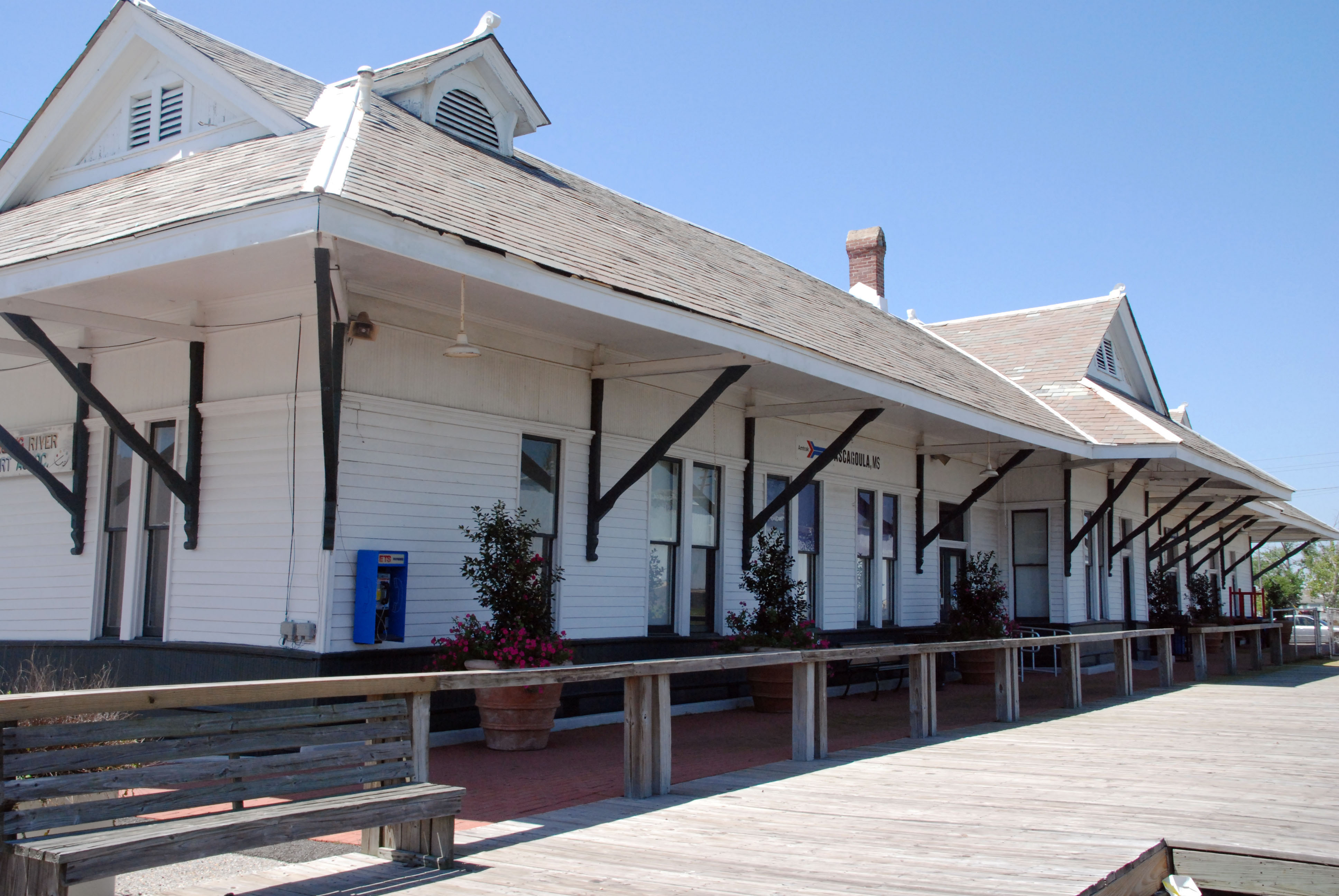
Pascagoula Art Depot, a gallery for local artists

The United States post office in Pascagoula contains a mural, Legend of the Singing River, painted in 1939 by Lorin Thompson. Murals were produced from 1934 to 1943 in the United States through the Section of Painting and Sculpture, later called the Section of Fine Arts, of the Treasury Department. The mural was restored in the 1960s as the building became the Pascagoula Public Library. The building was damaged by Hurricane Katrina in 2005, and the mural was placed in storage. In 2010, it was reinstalled at the new Pascagoula post office on Jackson Avenue.

Pascagoula is the home of the Old Spanish Fort, the oldest building in the Mississippi Valley. It was built sometime in the 1750s.

== Geography ==
Pascagoula is located along Mississippi Sound, on the east side of the mouth of the Pascagoula River. It is bordered to the north by Moss Point and to the west, across the Pascagoula River, by Gautier. The city has a total area of 24.5 square miles (63.4 km^{2}), of which 15.4 square miles (39.8 km^{2}) are land and 9.1 square miles (23.6 km^{2}), or 37.25%, are covered by water.

U.S. Route 90 (Denny Avenue) passes through the city, leading northeast 16 miles (26 km) to Grand Bay, Alabama, and west 21 miles (34 km) to Biloxi. Mississippi Highway 613 (Telephone Road) leads north from US-90 into Moss Point and 5 miles (8 km) to Interstate 10.

== Climate ==
According to the Köppen climate classification, Pascagoula has a humid subtropical climate, Cfa on climate maps. The hottest temperature recorded in Pascagoula was 106 °F (41.1 °C) on August 26, 2023, while the coldest temperature recorded was 16 °F (−8.9 °C) on January 30, 2014.

Climate data for Pascagoula, Mississippi (Trent Lott International Airport), 1991–2020 normals, extremes 1997–present
Month	Jan	Feb	Mar	Apr	May	Jun	Jul	Aug	Sep	Oct	Nov	Dec	Year
Record high °F (°C)	83 (28)	84 (29)	89 (32)	93 (34)	97 (36)	102 (39)	103 (39)	106 (41)	99 (37)	98 (37)	88 (31)	84 (29)	106 (41)
Mean maximum °F (°C)	76.1 (24.5)	78.9 (26.1)	82.9 (28.3)	85.9 (29.9)	92.8 (33.8)	96.7 (35.9)	97.1 (36.2)	96.7 (35.9)	94.2 (34.6)	90.5 (32.5)	82.7 (28.2)	79.0 (26.1)	98.7 (37.1)
Mean daily maximum °F (°C)	62.5 (16.9)	66.4 (19.1)	72.2 (22.3)	77.6 (25.3)	84.3 (29.1)	89.6 (32.0)	90.9 (32.7)	90.7 (32.6)	88.0 (31.1)	80.7 (27.1)	71.4 (21.9)	64.8 (18.2)	78.3 (25.7)
Daily mean °F (°C)	51.7 (10.9)	55.5 (13.1)	61.2 (16.2)	66.6 (19.2)	73.6 (23.1)	80.3 (26.8)	82.1 (27.8)	81.9 (27.7)	78.5 (25.8)	69.2 (20.7)	59.1 (15.1)	54.0 (12.2)	67.8 (19.9)
Mean daily minimum °F (°C)	40.9 (4.9)	44.6 (7.0)	50.1 (10.1)	55.7 (13.2)	63.0 (17.2)	71.1 (21.7)	73.4 (23.0)	73.2 (22.9)	69.0 (20.6)	57.7 (14.3)	46.9 (8.3)	43.2 (6.2)	57.4 (14.1)
Mean minimum °F (°C)	22.3 (−5.4)	27.4 (−2.6)	32.1 (0.1)	39.8 (4.3)	48.8 (9.3)	62.8 (17.1)	67.8 (19.9)	66.8 (19.3)	56.1 (13.4)	39.9 (4.4)	28.9 (−1.7)	27.3 (−2.6)	21.9 (−5.6)
Record low °F (°C)	16 (−9)	20 (−7)	21 (−6)	32 (0)	42 (6)	50 (10)	60 (16)	60 (16)	45 (7)	29 (−2)	19 (−7)	20 (−7)	16 (−9)
Average precipitation inches (mm)	4.97 (126)	4.01 (102)	4.73 (120)	4.40 (112)	4.95 (126)	6.91 (176)	6.65 (169)	7.89 (200)	4.84 (123)	3.69 (94)	3.79 (96)	4.90 (124)	61.73 (1,568)
Average precipitation days (≥ 0.01 in)	8.3	8.9	8.5	7.3	7.7	12.3	14.8	14.8	10.4	8.0	7.5	9.4	117.9
Source 1: NOAA
Source 2: National Weather Service (mean maxima/minima 2006–2020)

== Demographics ==
Historical population
Census	Pop.	Note	%±
1870	480		—
1880	418		−12.9%
1900	708		—
1910	3,379		377.3%
1920	6,082		80.0%
1930	4,339		−28.7%
1940	5,900		36.0%
1950	10,805		83.1%
1960	17,155		58.8%
1970	27,264		58.9%
1980	29,318		7.5%
1990	25,899		−11.7%
2000	26,200		1.2%
2010	22,392		−14.5%
2020	22,010		−1.7%
U.S. Decennial Census; 2018 Estimate

=== Racial and ethnic composition ===
Pascagoula city, Mississippi – Racial and ethnic composition Note: the US Census treats Hispanic/Latino as an ethnic category. This table excludes Latinos from the racial categories and assigns them to a separate category. Hispanics/Latinos may be of any race.
Race / Ethnicity (NH = Non-Hispanic)	Pop 2000	Pop 2010	Pop 2020	% 2000	% 2010	% 2020
White alone (NH)	17,084	12,200	10,272	65.21%	54.48%	46.67%
Black or African American alone (NH)	7,557	7,184	7,561	28.84%	32.08%	34.35%
Native American or Alaska Native alone (NH)	45	59	51	0.17%	0.26%	0.23%
Asian alone (NH)	247	210	152	0.94%	0.94%	0.69%
Native Hawaiian or Pacific Islander alone (NH)	5	9	3	0.02%	0.04%	0.01%
Other race alone (NH)	25	7	51	0.10%	0.03%	0.23%
Mixed race or Multiracial (NH)	218	251	666	0.83%	1.12%	3.03%
Hispanic or Latino (any race)	1,019	2,472	3,254	3.89%	11.04%	14.78%
Total	26,200	22,392	22,010	100.00%	100.00%	100.00%

=== 2020 census ===
As of the 2020 census, Pascagoula had a population of 22,010 and 8,800 households; 4,865 of those were families.

The median age was 36.7 years. 24.8% of residents were under the age of 18 and 15.0% of residents were 65 years of age or older. For every 100 females there were 93.8 males, and for every 100 females age 18 and over there were 90.7 males age 18 and over.

99.6% of residents lived in urban areas, while 0.4% lived in rural areas.

There were 8,800 households in Pascagoula, of which 33.1% had children under the age of 18 living in them. Of all households, 34.3% were married-couple households, 21.3% were households with a male householder and no spouse or partner present, and 37.2% were households with a female householder and no spouse or partner present. About 31.3% of all households were made up of individuals and 12.3% had someone living alone who was 65 years of age or older.

There were 10,524 housing units, of which 16.4% were vacant. The homeowner vacancy rate was 3.4% and the rental vacancy rate was 20.9%.

Racial composition as of the 2020 census
Race	Number	Percent
White	10,706	48.6%
Black or African American	7,679	34.9%
American Indian and Alaska Native	99	0.4%
Asian	153	0.7%
Native Hawaiian and Other Pacific Islander	8	0.0%
Some other race	1,998	9.1%
Two or more races	1,367	6.2%

=== 2000 census ===
As of the 2000 census, 26,200 people, 9,878 households, and 6,726 families were living in the city. The population density was 1,726.4 inhabitants per square mile (666.6/km^{2}). The 10,931 housing units had an average density of 720.3 units per square mile (278.1 units/km^{2}). The racial makeup of the city was 67.15% White, 28.97% African American, 0.18% Native American, 0.97% Asian, 1.69% from other races, and 1.04% from two or more races. Hispanics or Latinos of any race were 3.89% of the population.

Of the 9,878 households, 34.5% had children under 18 living with them, 44.6% were married couples living together, 18.8% had a female householder with no husband present, and 31.9% were not families. About 27.0% of all households were made up of individuals, and 9.7% had someone living alone who was 65 or older. The average household size was 2.52 and the average family size was 3.05.

In the city, the age distribution was 26.9% under 18, 12.0% from 18 to 24, 28.9% from 25 to 44, 20.4% from 45 to 64, and 11.9% who were 65 or older. The median age was 33 years. For every 100 females, there were 101.8 males. For every 100 females age 18 and over, there were 100.9 males. The median income for a household in the city was $32,042, and for a family was $39,044. Males had a median income of $30,313 versus $22,594 for females. The per capita income for the city was $16,891. About 18.1% of families and 20.7% of the population were below the poverty line, including 31.4% of those under age 18 and 13.0% of those age 65 or over.

== Economy ==
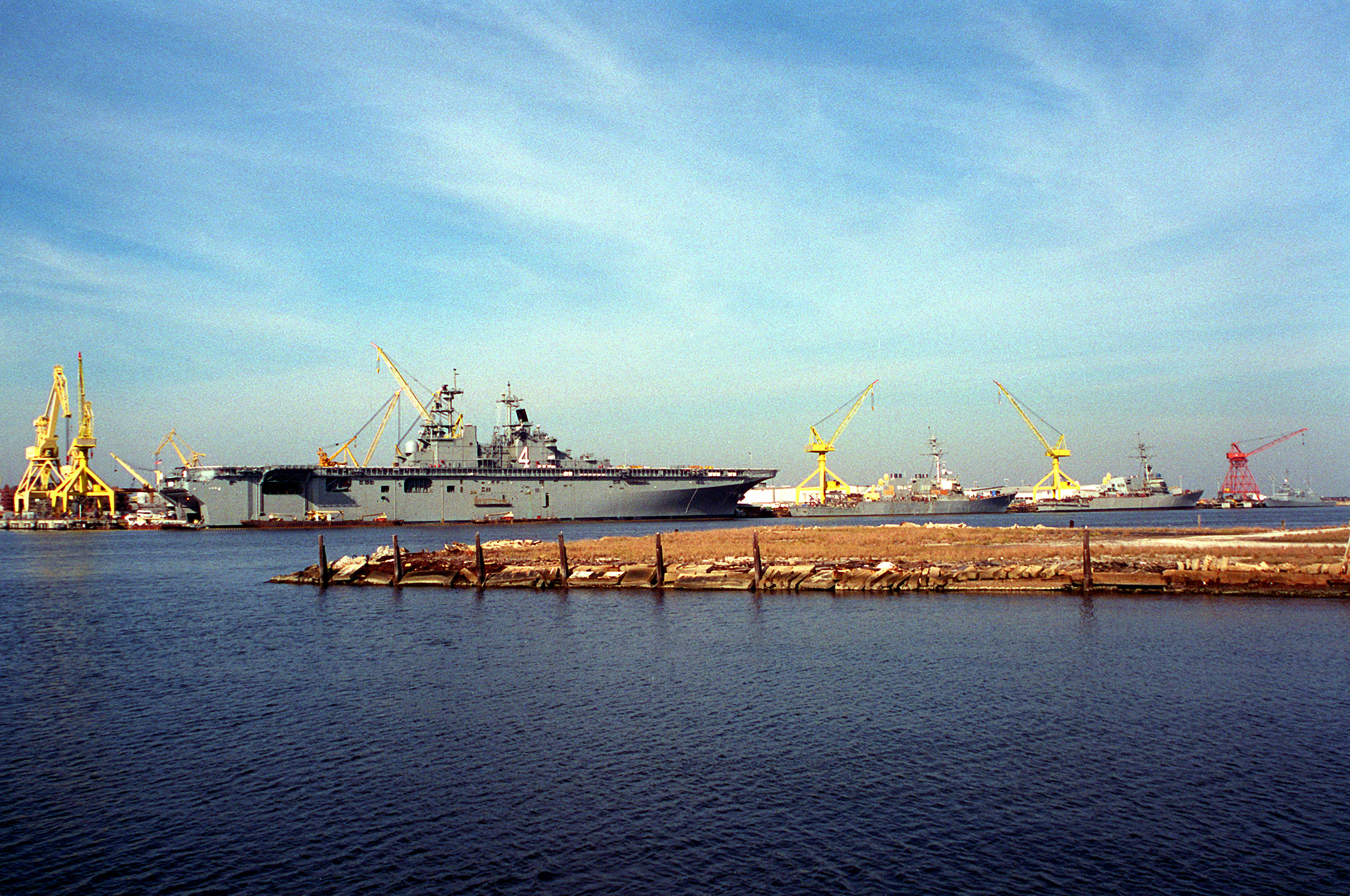
A section of the Ingalls Shipbuilding Company showing various US Navy ships under construction

Pascagoula is a major industrial city of Mississippi, on the Gulf Coast. Prior to World War II, the town was a sleepy fishing village of about 5,000. The population skyrocketed with the war-driven shipbuilding industry. The city's population seemed to peak in the late 1970s and early 1980s, as Cold War defense spending was at its height. Pascagoula experienced some new growth and development in the years before Hurricane Katrina.

Today, Pascagoula is home to the state's largest private, single-site employer, Ingalls Shipbuilding, owned by Huntington Ingalls Industries. Other major industries include the largest Chevron refinery in the world; Rolls-Royce Naval Marine, specializing in U.S. Navy ship propulsion; and First Chemical/Chemours.

Naval Station Pascagoula was located on Singing River Island and was homeport to several Navy warships, as well as a large Coast Guard contingent. Naval Station Pascagoula was decommissioned as part of the 2005 Base Realignment and Closure recommendations, and ceased operations in 2006.

== Education ==
The Pascagoula-Gautier School District serves Pascagoula. Resurrection Catholic School is a parochial school for prekindergarten to grade 12, established in 1882.

== Notable people ==
- Brent Anderson, country music singer
- Vick Ballard, NFL player
- Earl Blair, Canadian Football League player
- George Blair, NFL player
- Steve Bowman, NFL player
- Isaac Brown, Wichita State University basketball coach
- Terrell Buckley, NFL player
- Jimmy Buffett, musician, songwriter, author, actor, and businessman born here
- Joey Butler, MLB player
- William Colmer, US congressman
- Chuck Commiskey, NFL player
- Fred Cook, NFL player
- Tony Dees, Olympic silver medalist in 1992
- Uncle Elmer (real name: Stan Frazier), former professional wrestler
- Mike Ezell, U.S. representative for Mississippi
- Senquez Golson, NFL player
- Litterial Green, NBA player
- Ira B. Harkey Jr., editor and publisher of Pascagoula Chronicle, won Pulitzer Prize for courageous editorials devoted to processes of law and reason during integration crisis in Mississippi in 1962
- Antonio Harvey, NBA forward
- Richard Harvey, NFL player
- Dr. Calvin Huey, chemist, businessman, first African-American football player at Navy
- Edgar Hull, physician
- Sam Leslie, former MLB player (New York Giants and Brooklyn Dodgers) and Mississippi Sports Hall of Fame member
- Trent Lott, US senator
- Aubrey Matthews, NFL player
- Shane Matthews, NFL player
- Fishbait Miller, doorkeeper of the United States House of Representatives
- Jennifer Palmieri, politician
- Clyde Powers, NFL player
- Carl Tart, comedian/podcaster
- Channing Tatum, actor
- Kim Seaman, former professional baseball player (St. Louis Cardinals)
- Toni Seawright, first African-American Miss Mississippi
- Charles Sellier Jr., television and film producer, including The Life and Times of Grizzly Adams
- Tony Sipp, MLB player
- Judson Spence, musician, singer, songwriter
- Diron Talbert, NFL player
- Lynn Thomas, NFL player for San Francisco 49ers
- Sarah Thomas, first female NFL official
- Harry "The Hat" Walker, MLB player
- Otis Wonsley, NFL player

== Sister city ==
- – Chico, California (U.S.) 2005

== In popular culture ==
- Pascagoula is the setting for Ray Stevens's novelty song "Mississippi Squirrel Revival".
- Jimmy Buffett wrote a song called "The Pascagoula Run".
- Pascagoula is also home to the Mississippi's "Phantom Barber", where a man would run around cutting women's locks of hair at night.
- Several free concerts have been held in Pascagoula by famous musicians, including The Charlie Daniels Band (2006), Blake Shelton (2007), and Jimmy Buffett (2015)
- Pascagoula, along with several other Mississippi Gulf Coast cities, participates in hosting the "Crusin' the Coast" car show every year, which was named America's best car show in 2020 by USA Today.
- Pascagoula appears as a level in Tom Clancy's EndWar. The player is given the task of either destroying or defending the Pascagoula Refinery, described as the largest in the U.S.

== See also ==
- Pascagoula Abduction
- Pascagoula River High Rise Bridge
