= Sacred Heart Catholic School (Hattiesburg, Mississippi) =

Location
- 608 Southern Avenue (Elementary) 609 Southern Avenue (Upper Elementary) 510 West Pine Street (High School); Hattiesburg, (Forrest County), Mississippi 39401; United States
- 31°19′22″N 89°17′39″W

Information
- School type: Private College Preparatory and Arts
- Motto: Faith, Respect, Honor
- Religious affiliation: Roman Catholic
- Denomination: Roman Catholic
- Established: 1900
- Founder: Sisters of Mercy
- Principal: Vicki Flanagan (Elementary) Karyn Charles (High School)
- Grades: K–12
- Gender: Coeducational
- Enrollment: Approximately 650 (K-12)
- Colors: Blue and White
- Team name: Crusaders
- Accreditation: Southern Association of Colleges and Schools
- Affiliation: National Catholic Educational Association
- Website: www.shshattiesburg.com

Sacred Heart Catholic School is a Roman Catholic parochial school in the historic district of downtown Hattiesburg, Mississippi where it is mostly surrounded by Victorian-era homes and other churches. It is the only PK-12 school in Northern Deanery of the Roman Catholic Diocese of Biloxi.

Sacred Heart Catholic High School was officially detached from the elementary school on June 8, 2010, when the Hattiesburg City Council voted to accept a bid of $2.5 million for the city-owned property formerly known as First Baptist Church. The acquisition has ultimately added 40 classrooms to the school. Since the acquisition of the new building, the student population has expanded from just over 500 to over 700 students (K-12).

== Background ==
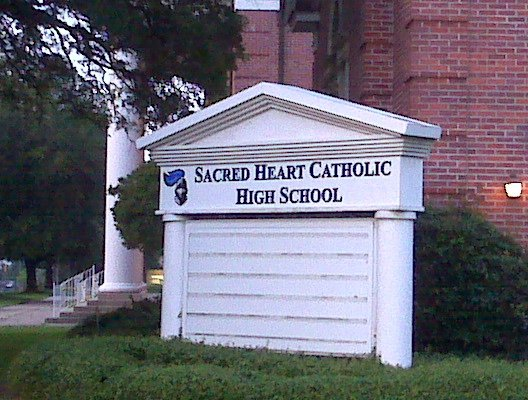
The New High School's marquee

Sacred Heart Catholic School was founded in 1900 by the Sisters of Mercy.

Sacred Heart Catholic School is one of the oldest existing schools in Hattiesburg. In October, 1900, Father Sylvester Greimel opened Sacred Heart Catholic School, the first Catholic school in the area, using the sacristy of the church and the rectory for classes. He was the first resident pastor at Sacred Heart Church. His sister, Miss Anne Greimel, was principal. Thirty-five students were enrolled.

The Sisters of Mercy arrived in September 1902. A convent and school had been built for them on Walnut Street, next to the church. In 1908, the first class of seniors graduated from the school.

The current Sacred Heart Church was built in 1927 and 1928. The current elementary building was built in 1951 and the convent which is now used for administrative offices and art room was built in 1959.

The Class of 1966 were the last to graduate from Sacred Heart when the high school closed due to low enrollment. Until 2004, Sacred Heart only offered classes through the 8th grade.

In 2004 Sacred Heart Catholic School was granted permission by the Roman Catholic Diocese of Biloxi to reopen its high school by adding the 9th and 10th grades. In 2005, the 11th grade was added and in 2006 the 12th grade was added. The Class of 2007 was the first class of seniors to graduate from Sacred Heart in 41 years. This small class of 9 students paved the way for many more to come through the high school.

The 2007–2008 school year saw many changes to the campus of Sacred Heart. A $4 million expansion and renovation to the campus brought 15 new classrooms, new chemistry lab, high school library and computer lab, as well as a new cafeteria designed by Albert and Associates Architects. Finlo Construction built the cafeteria and renovated the elementary building.

Groundbreaking for Sacred Heart Catholic School's new sports complex occurred in 2014. On August 15, 2016, the sports complex was completed and hosted the first football game of the 2016 season. The complex consists of a football field, soccer field, baseball field, softball field, and a track.

2023 brought even more expansion to the campus. The Parish and School were able to purchase the former Court Street United Methodist Church at 609 Southern Avenue, creating the upper elementary campus (5th-6th Grade), as well as the St. James Chapel and a new expanded Parish Life Center.

== Sports and Extracurricular Activities ==
Sacred Heart Gymnasium Home of Crusader Basketball and Volleyball

Sacred Heart Catholic High School participates under the guidelines of the Mississippi High School Activities Association.

=== Sports ===
Sacred Heart is a 2A school (based on the 2024 MHSAA enrollment numbers) with the following sports:

- Jr. High football
- Jr. High basketball (girls' and boys')
- Varsity basketball (girls' and boys')
  - 2016 boys' MHSAA 1A elite eight participant
  - 2020 girls' Region 8-1A championship
  - 2020 girls' MHSAA 1A final four participant
  - 2021 girls' Region 8-1A championship
  - 2021 girls' MHSAA 1A elite eight participant
- Varsity track
- Varsity and J.V. baseball
- Varsity tennis
  - 1A MHSAA State champions for 2007–2008.
  - 1A MHSAA State champions for 2008–2009.
  - 1A MHSAA State champions for 2009–2010.
- Girls' varsity volleyball
  - 2020 MHSAA 1A final four participant
  - 2021 Region 8-2A championship
- Varsity and J.V. softball
- Varsity cross country
- Varsity swimming
- Boys varsity soccer
  - 2012 State champions 1A/2A/3A
  - 2013 State champions 1A/2A/3A
  - 2019 State champions 1A/2A/3A
  - 2020 State champions 1A/2A/3A
- Girls’ varsity soccer
  - 2013 State champions 1A/2A/3A
  - 2014 State champions 1A/2A/3A
  - 2016 State champions 1A/2A/3A
  - 2017 State champions 1A/2A/3A
  - 2018 State champions 1A/2A/3A
  - 2019 State champions 1A/2A/3A
- Varsity Golf.
  - 2015 1A MHSAA boys' State champions
  - 2021 Class I MHSAA girls' State champions
- Powerlifting
- Jr. High cheerleading
- Varsity cheerleading
- Archery

=== Extracurricular Activities ===
- Speech and Debate
- Percussion
- Mock Trial State champions in 2009, 2010, 2011, 2013, 2014, 2015, 2016, 2017, 2018, 2019, 2020, 2021, 2022, 2023, and 2025.

=== Clubs ===
- National Honor Society – Grades 11 & 12
- Yearbook – Grades 9–12
- Student Council – Grades 7–12
- Senior Beta Club – Grades 9–12
- Campus Ministry – Grades 9–12
- Mu Alpha Theta - Grades 10–12
- Math Team - Grades 9–12
- Environmental Club- Grades 7–12
- Media Club - Grade 7–12.
