= Cathedral of the Nativity of the Blessed Virgin Mary (Biloxi, Mississippi) =

Historic church in Mississippi, US

- U.S. National Register of Historic Places
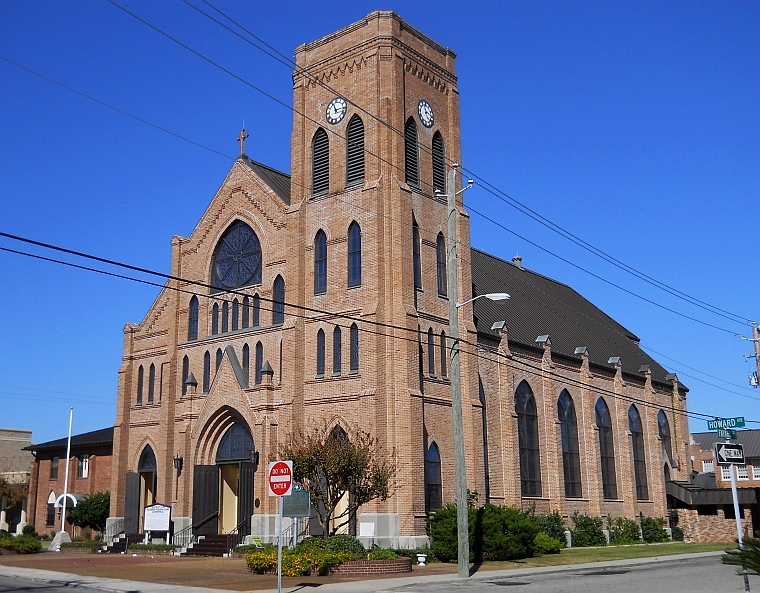

- Location within Mississippi Location within the United States
- Location: 870 W. Howard Avenue, Biloxi, Mississippi
- Coordinates: 30°23′49″N 88°53′28″W
- Area: 0.1 acres (0.040 ha)
- Built: 1902
- Architect: Theodore Brune
- Architectural style: Late Gothic Revival
- MPS: Biloxi MRA
- NRHP reference No.: 84002193
- Added to NRHP: May 18, 1984

The Cathedral of the Nativity of the Blessed Virgin Mary (BVM), at 870 West Howard Avenue in Biloxi, Mississippi, is the seat of the Catholic Diocese of Biloxi.

The cathedral was designed by Theodore Brune and built by J.F. Barnes & Company of Greenville, Mississippi in 1902. The cathedral was added to the National Register of Historic Places in 1984.

== History ==
=== First Nativity BVM Church ===
The first Catholic parish in Biloxi, Nativity Blessed Virgin Mary (BVM), was opened as a mission in 1843; the cornerstone for its church was laid in August 1843. At that time, coastal Mississippi was part of the Diocese of Natchez. The first Nativity BVM Church was dedicated in 1844. it was a brick building that was 50 by 25 feet (15.2 by 7.6 m) Between 1846 and 1856, the parish enlarged the church and constructed a rectory. The first Nativity BVM church was destroyed by a hurricane in 1869.

=== Second Nativity BVM Church ===
The second Nativity BVM church was dedicated in 1870. It was a larger and sturdier building, with dimensions of 75 by 35 feet (23 by 11 m)It cost $3,000 to build. The parish opened a school in 1871. At stone grotto to Our Lady of Lourdes was constructed at the church in 1893.

in 1900, the second Nativity BVM church, its school, convent and rectory were all destroyed by a fire that ravaged Biloxi. The diocese hired Theo Brune of New Orleans as the architect for the new church. Construction started in early 1902.

=== Third Nativity BVM Church ===
The third Nativity BVM church was dedicated in September of that year.By 1903, the parish enrollment was 1,728 parishioners. The diocese in 1906 installed nine stained glass windows in the cathedral, funded by a parishioner.The windows were built by Reis and Reis of Munich, Germany, and installed by Frederick Thornley of New York. That same year, new pews, a altar railing and altar, bell and clock along with Stations of the Cross were also donated to the church.

A hurricane in 1916 damaged the roof, altar and other areas of the cathedral. The church interior was repainted in 1929, thanks to a donation from New York Governor Al Smith. Radiators were installed in 1930. In 1942, 30 soldiers from Keesler Army Airfield in Biloxi installed a new floor in Nativity BVM. The diocese in 1943 replaced the wooden altars in the church with three marble ones. The roof was replaced along with the altar rail and the sanctuary was remodeled. Hurricane Camille in 1969 caused some damage to Nativity BVM.

=== Cathedral of the Nativity BVM ===
Pope Paul VI erected the Diocese of Biloxi, with territory taken from the Diocese of Natchez-Jackson on March 1, 1977. The pope appointed Auxiliary Bishop Joseph Lawson Howze of Natchez-Jackson as the first bishop of Biloxi.Nativity BVM Church now became the Cathedral of Nativity BVM.

In 1985, Hurricane Elena damaged the cathedral. The diocese inaugurated an renovation project at the cathedral in 1989, also creating the new Marina Chapel. Nativity BVM was rededicated in 1990. Hurricane Katrina inflicted significant damage on the cathedral in 2005.

== See also ==
- List of Catholic cathedrals in the United States
- List of cathedrals in the United States
