= John Baptist Pitaval =

American prelate

The Most Reverend John Baptist Pitaval
- Archbishop of Santa Fe
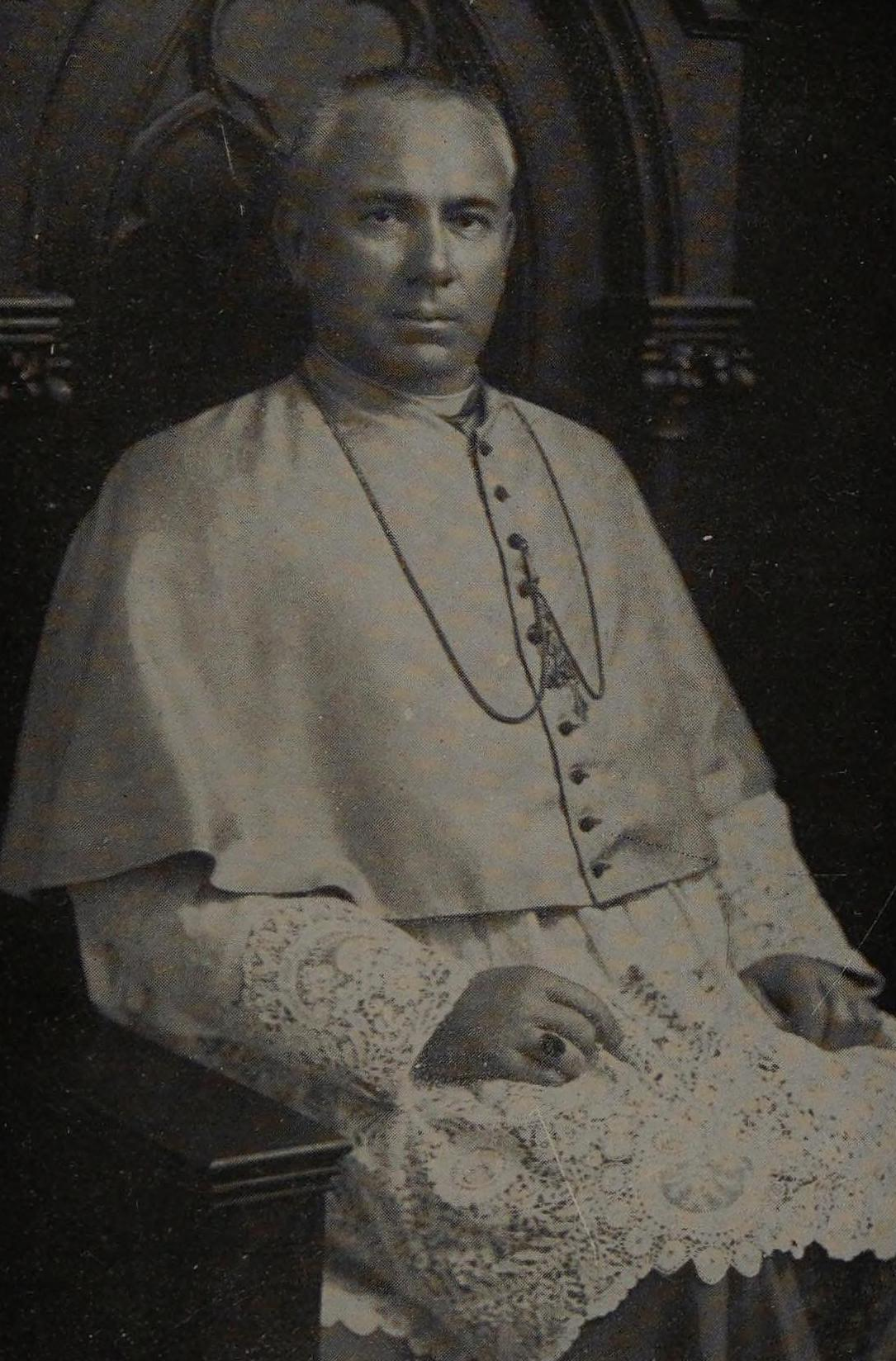
- Church: Catholic Church
- Archdiocese: Santa Fe
- Appointed: February 1, 1909
- Retired: July 29, 1918
- Predecessor: Peter Bourgade
- Successor: Albert Daeger
- Other post: Auxiliary Bishop of Santa Fe (1902-1909)

Orders
- Ordination: December 24, 1881 by Joseph Projectus Machebeuf
- Consecration: July 25, 1902 by Peter Bourgade

Personal details
- Born: February 10, 1858 Saint-Genis-Terrenoir, Auvergne-Rhône-Alpes, France
- Died: May 23, 1928 (aged 70) Denver, Colorado, U.S.

John Baptist Pitaval (February 10, 1858 – May 23, 1928) was an American prelate of the Catholic Church. He served as Archbishop of Santa Fe from 1909 to 1918.

== Early life and education ==
Pitaval was born on February 10, 1858, in Saint-Genis-Terrenoir to Jean Claude and Mariette (née Pugnet) Pitaval. He made his preliminary studies for the priesthood in the Archdiocese of Lyon, where he was ordained a subdeacon.

Pitaval accepted an invitation from Bishop Joseph Projectus Machebeuf to join the Diocese of Denver, arriving in the United States in June 1881. He completed his theological studies at St. Mary's Seminary in Baltimore, Maryland, where he was ordained a deacon by Archbishop James Gibbons.

== Priesthood ==
Pitaval was ordained a priest on December 24, 1881, by Bishop Machebeuf at the chapel of St. Mary's Academy in Denver. Along with Robert Servant, he was one of the first two Catholic priests ordained in Colorado.

Pitaval engaged in missionary work for the next 21 years. He first served in the San Luis Valley, traveling the valley on horseback and supporting himself by selling livestock. In 1890, he was transferred to St. Paul's Church in Aspen, where he built a combination church and school building. He was appointed to St. Columba Church at Durango in March 1902, remaining there only for a few months.

== Bishop in Santa Fe ==
On May 14, 1902, Pitaval was appointed auxiliary bishop of the Archdiocese of Santa Fe and titular bishop of Sora by Pope Leo XIII. He received his episcopal consecration on the following July 25 from Archbishop Peter Bourgade, with Bishops Nicholas Chrysostom Matz and Henry Regis Granjon serving as co-consecrators.

Pitaval served as an auxiliary bishop for seven years and, following the death of Archbishop Bourgade, he was appointed by Pope Pius X to succeed him as Archbishop of Santa Fe on February 1, 1909. His appointment was praised by Governor George Curry, who sent a message of thanks to Rome.

At the beginning of Pitaval's tenure in 1909, the archdiocese contained 127,000 Catholics, 65 priests, 45 parishes, 340 missions, 12 parochial schools, and three hospitals. Following his retirement nine years later, there were over 140,000 Catholics, 80 priests, 46 parishes, 356 missions, 26 parochial schools, and five hospitals. Among the institutions he founded were St. Anthony's Orphanage at Albuquerque and St. Mary's Hospital at Gallup. He also erected a bronze statue of Jean-Baptiste Lamy, Santa Fe's first archbishop, outside the Cathedral of St. Francis of Assisi.

== Later life and death ==
Pitaval resigned as Archbishop of Santa Fe on July 29, 1918, citing his poor health and desire for a new generation of leadership. He was given the honorary title of titular archbishop of Amida by Pope Benedict XV. He retired to Colorado, residing at St. Anthony Hospital and briefly serving as a chaplain there.

Pitaval died from complications with Bright's disease, diabetes, and heart disease at St. Anthony Hospital on May 23, 1928, at age 70. He is buried at Mount Olivet Cemetery.

Catholic Church titles
Preceded by Peter Bourgade	Archbishop of Santa Fe; 1909–1918	Succeeded by Albert Daeger
