= Albert Daeger =

American prelate (1872–1932)

The Most Reverend Albert Daeger OFM
- Archbishop of Santa Fe
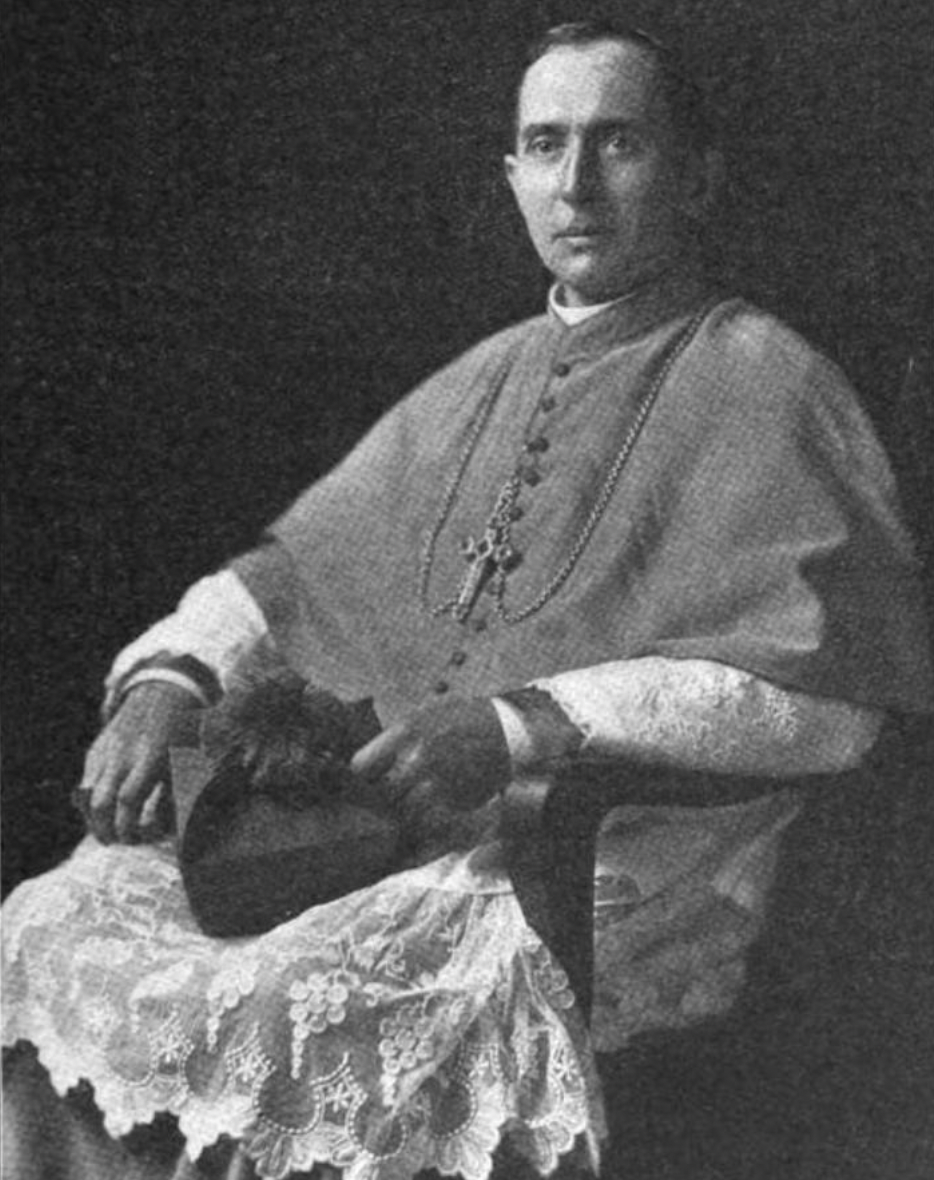
- Church: Catholic Church
- Archdiocese: Santa Fe
- Appointed: March 10, 1919
- Term ended: December 2, 1932 (his death)
- Predecessor: John Baptist Pitaval
- Successor: Rudolph Gerken

Orders
- Ordination: July 25, 1896 by Silas Chatard
- Consecration: May 7, 1919 by John Baptist Pitaval

Personal details
- Born: Anthony Thomas Daeger; March 5, 1872 Sand Creek Township, Indiana, U.S.
- Died: December 2, 1932 (aged 60) Santa Fe, New Mexico, U.S.

Albert Daeger OFM (born Anthony Thomas Daeger; March 5, 1872 – December 2, 1932) was an American prelate of the Catholic Church. A member of the Order of Friars Minor, he served as Archbishop of Santa Fe from 1919 until his death in 1932.

== Biography ==
=== Early life ===
Anthony Thomas Daeger was born on March 5, 1872, in Sand Creek Township, near the city of North Vernon, in Jennings County, Indiana. The son of George and Frances (née Kriech) Daeger, he was the eldest of twelve brothers and one sister. His paternal grandfather was a German immigrant who joined the Order of Friars Minor (also known as the Franciscans) after the death of his wife. Both Daeger and his brother George (later Father Vigil) would follow in their grandfather's footsteps and become Franciscan friars.

Daeger received his early education at the parochial school of St. Ann's Church in North Vernon. At age 10, he was sent to continue his education at the school of St. George's Church in Cincinnati, Ohio, living at the rectory and running errands for the church's Franciscan pastor while attending school. After St. George's, he attended St. Francis Seraph School in Cincinnati, graduating in June 1889.

In August 1889, Daeger returned to Indiana and entered the Franciscan order at the novitiate in Oldenburg. He completed his philosophical studies at Franciscan friaries in Ohio and Kentucky, including St. Boniface in Louisville. and St. Francis Seminary in Cincinnati. On August 27, 1893, Daeger professed his vows and took the religious name Albert. He then returned to Oldenburg to finish his theological courses.

=== Priesthood ===
While in Indiana, Daeger was ordained a priest on July 25, 1896, by Bishop Silas Chatard. He celebrated his first Mass the next day, the feast of Saint Anne, at his childhood parish named after her. His first assignment was as an assistant pastor at Our Lady of Sorrows Church in Kansas City, Missouri (1896–1897). He then served as an assistant (1897–1900) and pastor (1900–1902) at St. Francis de Sales Church in Lincoln, Nebraska, where he was a neighbor and admirer of William Jennings Bryan.

Daeger then embarked on 17 years of missionary work in New Mexico. He served as a pastor and the superior of his fellow Franciscans at Our Lady of Guadalupe in Peña Blanca (1902–1910), Sacred Heart in Farmington (1910–1917), and San Diego Mission in Jemez Pueblo (1917–1919). His parishes were extensive and often required him to travel many miles by foot, but he succeeded in establishing chapels and schools where he went. He contracted pneumonia during a snow storm in March 1909 but eventually recovered.

=== Archbishop of Santa Fe ===
Following the retirement of Archbishop John Baptist Pitaval, Daeger was appointed by Pope Benedict XV to succeed him as Archbishop of Santa Fe on March 10, 1919. He received his episcopal consecration on the following May 7 from Archbishop Pitaval, with Bishops John Henry Tihen and Anthony Joseph Schuler serving as co-consecrators, at the Cathedral of St. Francis of Assisi in Santa Fe. He was the first American-born Archbishop of Santa Fe, as all his predecessors were born in France.

When Daeger arrived in Santa Fe, the archdiocese contained 80 priests, 356 churches (46 parishes and 310 missions), and 26 schools. By the time of his death 13 years later, there were 106 priests, 362 churches (56 parishes and 306 missions), and 35 schools. In December 1928, he presided at the funeral Mass of Father Anton Docher in Isleta Pueblo.

On December 2, 1932, Daeger fractured his skull after falling 10 feet into the basement of a Santa Fe garage. He was rushed to St. Vincent's Hospital, where he died a few hours later at age 60. He is buried at the Cathedral of St. Francis of Assisi.

Catholic Church titles
Preceded by John Baptist Pitaval	Archbishop of Santa Fe; 1919—1932	Succeeded by Rudolph Gerken
