= Salpointe =

Salpointe may refer to:

- Jean-Baptiste Salpointe (1825–1898), first Roman Catholic bishop of Arizona
- Salpointe Catholic High School, located in Tucson, Arizona
