= Peter Bourgade =

French-born American prelate

The Right Reverend Peter Bourgade
- Archbishop of Santa Fe
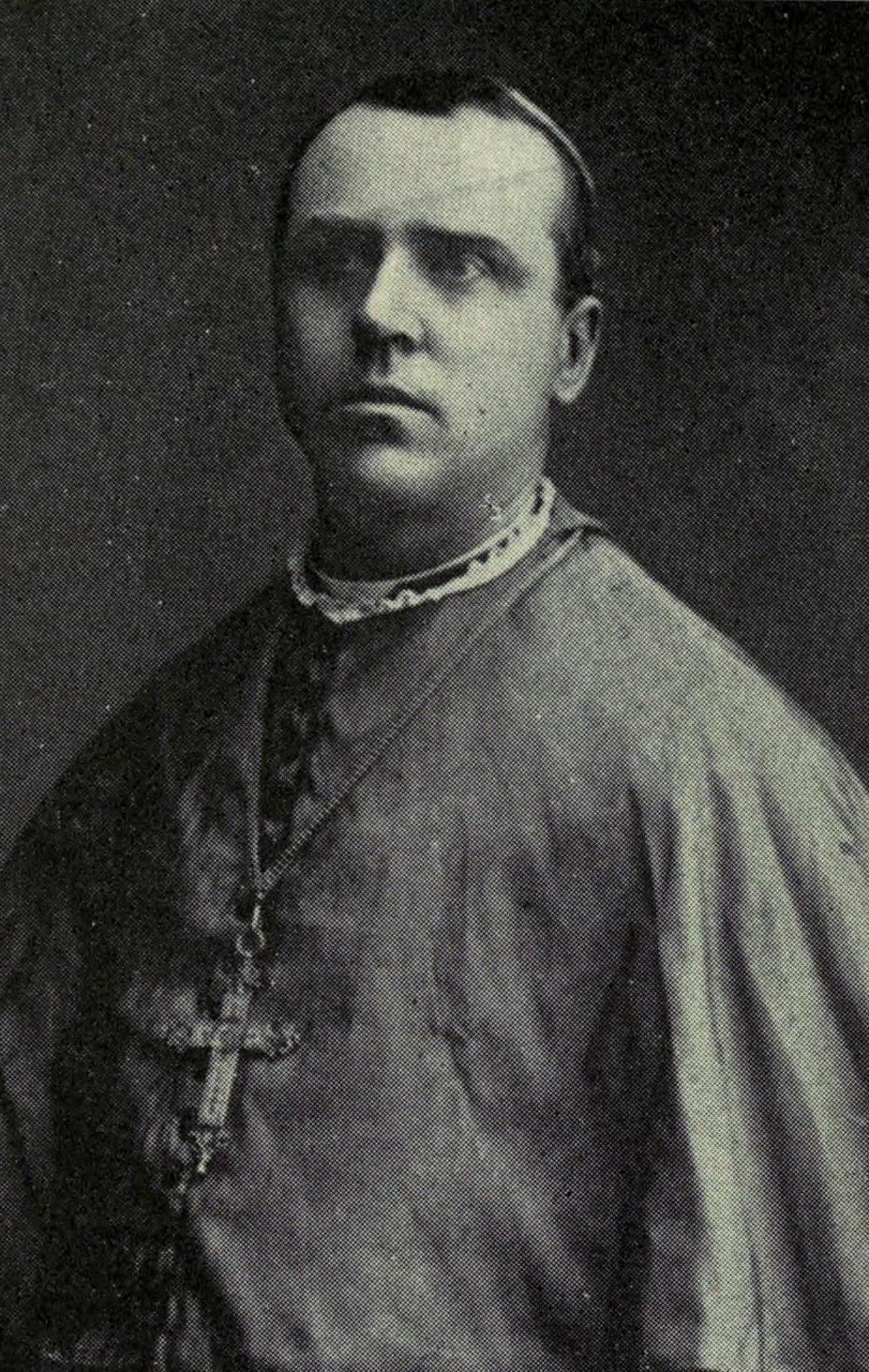
- Church: Catholic
- Archdiocese: Archdiocese of Santa Fe
- Appointed: January 7, 1899
- Term ended: May 17, 1908 (his death)
- Predecessor: Placide Louis Chapelle
- Successor: John Baptist Pitaval
- Other post: Bishop of Tucson (1885-1899)

Orders
- Ordination: November 30, 1869 by Jean-Baptiste Salpointe
- Consecration: May 1, 1885 by Jean-Baptiste Lamy

Personal details
- Born: October 17, 1845 Vollore-Ville, Puy-de-Dôme, France
- Died: May 17, 1908 (aged 62) Chicago, Illinois, U.S.
- Motto: Ego mater sanctae spei (I am the mother of holy hope)

Peter Bourgade (October 17, 1845 – May 17, 1908) was a French-born American prelate of the Catholic Church. He served as bishop of Tucson in the Arizona Territory (1885–1899) and archbishop of Santa Fe in the New Mexico Territory (1899–1908).

== Biography ==
=== Early life ===
Bourgade was born on October 17, 1845, in Vollore-Ville, Puy-de-Dôme, to Claude and Marie (née Chapet) Bourgade. He received his early education under the Brothers of the Christian Schools and completed his classical studies at the Jesuit college of Billom in France. He studied for the priesthood at Saint-Sulpice Seminary in France, receiving his minor orders during that time.

In 1869, during his fifth year at Saint-Sulpice, Bourgade and five other seminarians were recruited by the newly consecrated Bishop Jean-Baptiste Salpointe to serve in the missions in the American Southwest. The group sailed from Brest, France, in September 1869 to the United States. They then traveled by railroad and stagecoach to Las Cruces in the New Mexico Territory.

=== Priesthood ===
Bourgade was ordained to the priesthood for the Archdiocese of Santa Fe on November 30, 1869 in Santa Fe.

Following his ordination, Bourgade was named pastor of Immaculate Conception Church in Yuma in the Arizona Territory. However, in the summer of 1873, ill health forced him to return to France for two years. He returned to the United States in 1875 and the archdiocese assigned him to San Elizario, Texas, where he served as pastor for six years and opened a parochial school under the Sisters of Loreto in 1879. In 1881, he was transferred to St. Vincent de Paul Parish in Silver City, New Mexico, where he built a convent, hospital, and academy for the Sisters of Mercy.

=== Vicar Apostolic of Arizona ===
On February 7, 1885, Bourgade was appointed vicar apostolic of Arizona and titular bishop of Thaumacus by Pope Leo XIII. He received his episcopal consecration on May 1, 1885, from Archbishop Jean-Baptiste Lamy, with Salpointe and Bishop Joseph Projectus Machebeuf serving as co-consecrators, at the Cathedral of St. Francis of Assisi in Santa Fe.

=== Bishop of Tucson ===
Leo XIII elevated the Vicariate of Arizona to the Diocese of Tucson on May 8, 1897, and appointed Bourgade as its first bishop. He there established twelve schools and an orphanage and also rebuilt the Cathedral of Saint Augustine.

Bourgade was named the fourth Archbishop of Santa Fe on January 7, 1899. He served as archbishop for nine years, and his last annual report to Rome showed the archdiocese contained a Catholic population of 167,000 people, 45 churches with resident priests, and 340 missions. He was in poor health for most of his tenure and received Reverend John Baptist Pitaval as an auxiliary bishop in 1902.

=== Death ===
In May 1908, due to his failing health, Bourgade was sent to Mercy Hospital in Chicago and placed under the care of Dr. John Benjamin Murphy. He died in Chicago on May 17, 1908 at age 62. He is buried in the crypt of the Cathedral of St. Francis of Assisi.

Catholic Church titles
Preceded by Jean-Baptiste Salpointe (as Vicar Apostolic of Arizona)	Bishop of Tucson; 1885–1899	Succeeded by Henry Regis Granjon
Preceded by Placide Louis Chapelle	Archbishop of Santa Fe; 1899–1908	Succeeded by John Baptist Pitaval
