= Jean-Baptiste Salpointe =

Catholic bishop (1825–1898)

His Excellency, The Most Reverend Jean-Baptiste Salpointe
- Archbishop of Santa Fe
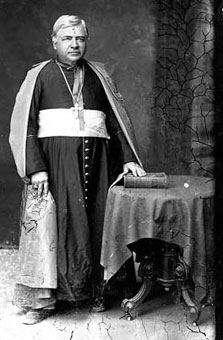
- Archdiocese: Santa Fe
- In office: July 18, 1885 – January 7, 1894
- Predecessor: Jean-Baptiste Lamy
- Successor: Placide Louis Chapelle
- Other posts: Vicar General of the Arizona Missions (1864–1868); Bishop of Arizona Territory (1868–1885)

Orders
- Ordination: December 20, 1851 by Louis-Charles Féron
- Consecration: June 20, 1869 by Louis-Charles Féron

Personal details
- Born: 21 February 1825 Saint-Maurice-près-Pionsat, Puy-de-Dôme, France
- Died: 15 July 1898 (aged 73) Tucson, Arizona, United States

Jean-Baptiste Salpointe (French pronunciation: [ʒɑ̃ batist salpwɛ̃t]; February 21, 1825 – July 15, 1898) was a French-born prelate who serve as archbishop of the Archdiocese of Santa Fe in New Mexico in the United States from 1885 to 1894.

Salpointe previously served as vicar apostolic of the Arizona Territory from 1868 to 1885.

== Early life and education ==
Salpointe was born on February 21, 1825 in Saint-Maurice-près-Pionsat, Puy-de-Dôme, France, to Jean and Jeanne (née Mandigon) Salpointe. He received his preparatory education in a school in Agen and studied the classics at the College of Clermont in present-day Clermont-Ferrand, France. He subsequently studied philosophy and theology in the Grand Seminary of Montferrand in Montferrand, France.

== Priesthood ==
Salpointe was ordained a priest for the Diocese of Clermont in France on December 20, 1851, by Bishop Louis-Charles Féron.In 1859, Salpointe volunteered to come to the New Mexico Territory in the United States as a missionary.

In 1860, Salpointe was assigned to the parish in Mora, New Mexico, where he served for six years. The expanse of that parish extended for over 200 miles from north to south. Among his accomplishments at Mora was his success in persuading the Sisters of Loretto and the De La Salle Christian Brothers to come to the parish and establish schools there.

== Vicar Apostolic of Arizona ==
In August 1864, Bishop Jean-Baptiste Lamy of Santa Fe was informed that the Jesuits in Arizona had been recalled by their superior and that the Arizona Territory was left without priests to care for the spiritual wants of its people. Salpointe was appointed vicar general of the Arizona Missions.

On February 7, 1866, Salpointe arrived in Tucson, Arizona, along with two priests from Santa Fe. At the time, Arizona consisted of approximately 6,000 settlers in some half a dozen settlements and several mining camps, as well as the Native Americans that inhabited the territory. Salpointe set about building churches, organizing new congregations, and founding schools and hospitals in the territory. Salpointe helped complete the San Agustin Church in Tucson. This was the first cathedral church built in what was then called the Arizona Territory, now the State of Arizona.

In 1868, Pope Pius IX designated Arizona as a vicariate apostolic. He appointed Salpointe as the titular bishop of Dorylaëum and as vicar apostolic of Arizona on September 25, 1868. Salpointe was consecrated on June 20, 1869, in France by Féron at the Cathedral of Our Lady of the Assumption of Clermont-Ferrand in Clermont-Ferrand.

== Coadjutor Archbishop and Archbishop of Santa Fe ==
On February 19, 1885, Salpointe was appointed as coadjutor archbishop of Santa Fe to assist Lamy, but remained as administrator of the Vicariate of Arizona until the appointment of his successor, Bishop Peter Bourgade, in early 1885. Salpointe then succeeded Lamy as archbishop of Santa Fe on July 18, 1885.

== Retirement and death ==
Archbishop Salpointe retired as archbishop of Santa Fe on January 7, 1894.He moved to Tucson, where he wrote a history of the Catholic Church in the Southwestern United States. Salpointe died on July 15, 1898, and is buried under the altar of St. Augustine Cathedral in Tucson. Salpointe Catholic High School in that city is named in his honor.

Catholic Church titles
Preceded by Vicariate Created	Vicariate Apostolic of Arizona; 1868–1885	Succeeded by Peter Bourgade
Preceded by Jean-Baptiste Lamy	Archbishop of Santa Fe; 1885–1894	Succeeded by Placide Louis Chapelle
