= Edwin Byrne =

American Catholic prelate (1891–1963)

His Excellency, The Most Reverend Edwin Byrne
- Archbishop of Santa Fe
- Church: Catholic Church; Latin Church
- Archdiocese: Santa Fe
- In office: 1943–1963
- Previous posts: Bishop of Ponce (1925‍–‍1929); Bishop of San Juan de Puerto Rico (1929‍–‍1943)

Orders
- Ordination: May 22, 1915 by Edmond Francis Prendergast
- Consecration: November 30, 1925 by Dennis Joseph Dougherty

Personal details
- Born: August 9, 1891 Philadelphia, Pennsylvania, U.S.
- Died: July 26, 1963 (aged 71) Santa Fe, New Mexico, U.S.
- Buried: Cathedral Basilica of Saint Francis of Assisi
- Education: St. Charles Borromeo Seminary

Edwin Vincent Byrne (August 9, 1891 – July 26, 1963) was an American prelate of the Catholic Church. He served as archbishop of the Archdiocese of Santa Fe in New Mexico from 1943 to 1963. He previously served in Puerto Rico as bishop of the Diocese of Ponce from 1925 to 1929 and as bishop of the Diocese of San Juan de Puerto Rico from 1929 to 1943.

== Biography ==
=== Early life ===
Edwin Byrne was born on August 9, 1891, in Philadelphia, Pennsylvania, to Francis Charles and Anna (née Carroll) Byrne. After graduating from Roman Catholic High School for Boys in Philadelphia in 1908, he studied at St. Charles Borromeo Seminary in Philadelphia.

=== Priesthood ===
Byrne was ordained to the priesthood for the Archdiocese of Philadelphia at the Cathedral of Saints Peter and Paul in Philadelphia by Archbishop Edmond Francis Prendergast on May 22, 1915. After his ordination, the archdiocese assigned Byrne as a curate at Our Lady of Lourdes Parish in Philadelphia. After the American entry into World War I in April 1917, he enlisted in the US Navy Chaplain Corps.

In 1920, Byrne traveled to the Philippines to serve as secretary. From 1920 to 1923, he was secretary to Bishop James McCloskey of the Diocese of Jaro. McCloskey named Byrne as vicar general of Jaro in 1923.

=== Bishop of Ponce ===
On June 23, 1925, Byrne was appointed the first bishop of Ponce by Pope Pius XI. He received his episcopal consecration on November 30, 1925, at the Cathedral of Saints Peter and Paul from Cardinal Dennis Joseph Dougherty, with Bishop John Joseph Swint and Bishop Andrew James Louis Brennan serving as co-consecrators.

=== Bishop of San Juan de Puerto Rico ===
Pius XI appointed Byrne as bishop of San Juan on March 8, 1929. The Vatican in 1940 elevated him to the rank of assistant at the Pontifical Throne.

=== Archbishop of Santa Fe ===
Byrne was appointed the eighth archbishop of Santa Fe by Pope Pius XII on June 12, 1943. During his 20-year-long tenure, he was instrumental in the construction of many churches and schools, and built up the diocesan clergy. In 1958, his decree that no Catholic girl should appear in a bathing suit in the Miss New Mexico pageant received national attention and stirred controversy; he never rescinded the ban. He condemned a "right to work" bill being considered in the New Mexico Legislature. Byrne also prohibited Catholic students from dating while attending high school, describing "going steady, keeping steady company, necking and kissing" as "pagan" practices. Byrne attended the first session of the Second Vatican Council in Rome in 1962.

=== Death ===
Byrne suffered a gallbladder attack on July 21, 1963, and was admitted to St. Vincent Hospital in Santa Fe two days later. He underwent surgery for gallbladder removal on July 26, 1963, dying later that day. He was buried at Cathedral Basilica of Saint Francis of Assisi in Santa Fe.

== External links and additional sources ==
- Cheney, David M. "Archdiocese of San Juan de Puerto Rico". Catholic-Hierarchy.org. (for Chronology of Bishops) ^{[self-published]}
- Chow, Gabriel. "Metropolitan Archdiocese of San Juan de Puerto Rico". GCatholic.org. (for Chronology of Bishops) ^{[self-published]}

Catholic Church titles
Preceded by None	Bishop of Ponce; 1925–1929	Succeeded by Aloysius Joseph Willinger
Preceded by Jorge José Caruana	Bishop of San Juan; 1929–1943	Succeeded by James Peter Davis
Preceded by Rudolph Gerken	Archbishop of Santa Fe; 1943–1963	Succeeded by James Peter Davis
