= James Peter Davis =

American prelate

His Excellency, The Most Reverend James Peter Davis
- Archbishop of Santa Fe
- Church: Catholic Church; Latin Church
- Archdiocese: Santa Fe
- In office: 1964 to 1974
- Predecessor: Edwin Byrne
- Successor: Luis Aponte Martinez
- Previous post: Bishop of San Juan (1943 to 1960)

Orders
- Ordination: May 19, 1929 by Daniel James Gercke
- Consecration: October 6, 1943 by Daniel James Gercke

Personal details
- Born: June 9, 1904 Houghton, Michigan, US
- Died: March 4, 1988 (aged 83) Phoenix, Arizona, US
- Education: St. Patrick's Seminary

James Peter Davis (June 9, 1904 – March 4, 1988) was an American prelate of the Roman Catholic Church. He served as bishop and later archbishop of San Juan de Puerto Rico (1943–1964) and archbishop of Santa Fe in New Mexico (1964–1974).

== Biography ==
=== Early life ===
James Davis was born on June 9, 1904, in Houghton, Michigan, the only child of John Frank and Elizabeth R. (née Didier) Davis. He and his family moved to Topeka, Kansas, and afterwards to Flagstaff, Arizona. He studied for the priesthood at St. Patrick's Seminary in Menlo Park, California.

=== Priesthood ===
Davis was ordained to the priesthood for the Diocese of Tucson on May 19, 1929, in Tucson by Archbishop Daniel James Gercke. He served as chancellor of the diocese from 1930 to 1932.

==== Bishop and Archbishop of San Juan de Puerto Rico ====
On July 3, 1943, Davis was appointed bishop of San Juan de Puerto Rico by Pope Pius XII. He received his episcopal consecration from Gercke on August 6, 1943 at the Cathedral of Saint Augustine in Tucson, with Bishops Thomas Arthur Connolly and Joseph Thomas McGucken serving as co-consecrators.In 1958, Davis estimated that 90 percent of Puerto Ricans were nominally Catholics, while only 30 percent practiced their faith.

A strong opponent of Puerto Rican Governor Luis Muñoz Marín, Davis reportedly declared in 1953 that he "will never climb the steps of the Fortaleza [the government headquarters] as long as Luis Muñoz Marín is Governor of Puerto Rico." However, in March 1953 Davis denied that the diocese had broken relations with the government. He further stated that he hoped for a reconciliation with Muñoz Marín.

In October 1960, right before the gubernatorial election in Puerto Rico, Byrne and the two other bishops on the island issued a pastoral letter that strongly discouraged Catholics from voting for Muñoz Marín's Popular Democratic Party. An outraged Muñoz Marín said that he was going to protest their action to the Vatican. A few days later, the chancellor of the Diocese of Ponce in Puerto Rico threatened to excommunicate Catholics who voted for the Popular Democratic Party. Byrne on November 21st stated that Catholics would not be excommunicated or other punished for voting for Muñoz Marín. On November 25th, Muñoz Marín and the central committee of his party released a statement saying that nothing in the party platform contradicted Christian doctrine.

On April 30, 1960, Pope John XXIII elevated the Diocese of San Juan de Puerto Rico to Archdiocese of San Juan de Puerto Rico, with Davis as its first archbishop.

=== Archbishop of Santa Fe ===
On January 3, 1964, Pope Paul VI named Davis as the ninth archbishop of Santa Fe.

=== Retirement and death ===
Five years before reaching the mandatory age of retirement for a bishop according to canon law, Davis retired as archbishop of Santa Fe in 1974. He died on March 4, 1988 in Phoenix, Arizona, in 1988. He was buried at Cathedral Basilica of Saint Francis of Assisi in Santa Fe, New Mexico.

== External links and additional sources ==
- Cheney, David M. "Archdiocese of San Juan de Puerto Rico". Catholic-Hierarchy.org. (for Chronology of Bishops) ^{[self-published]}
- Chow, Gabriel. "Metropolitan Archdiocese of San Juan de Puerto Rico". GCatholic.org. (for Chronology of Bishops) ^{[self-published]}

Catholic Church titles
Preceded by Edwin Byrne	Archbishop of San Juan; 1943–1964	Succeeded by Luis Aponte Martínez
Preceded by Edwin Byrne	Archbishop of Santa Fe; 1964–1974	Succeeded by Robert Sanchez
