= Treasure of Pionsat =

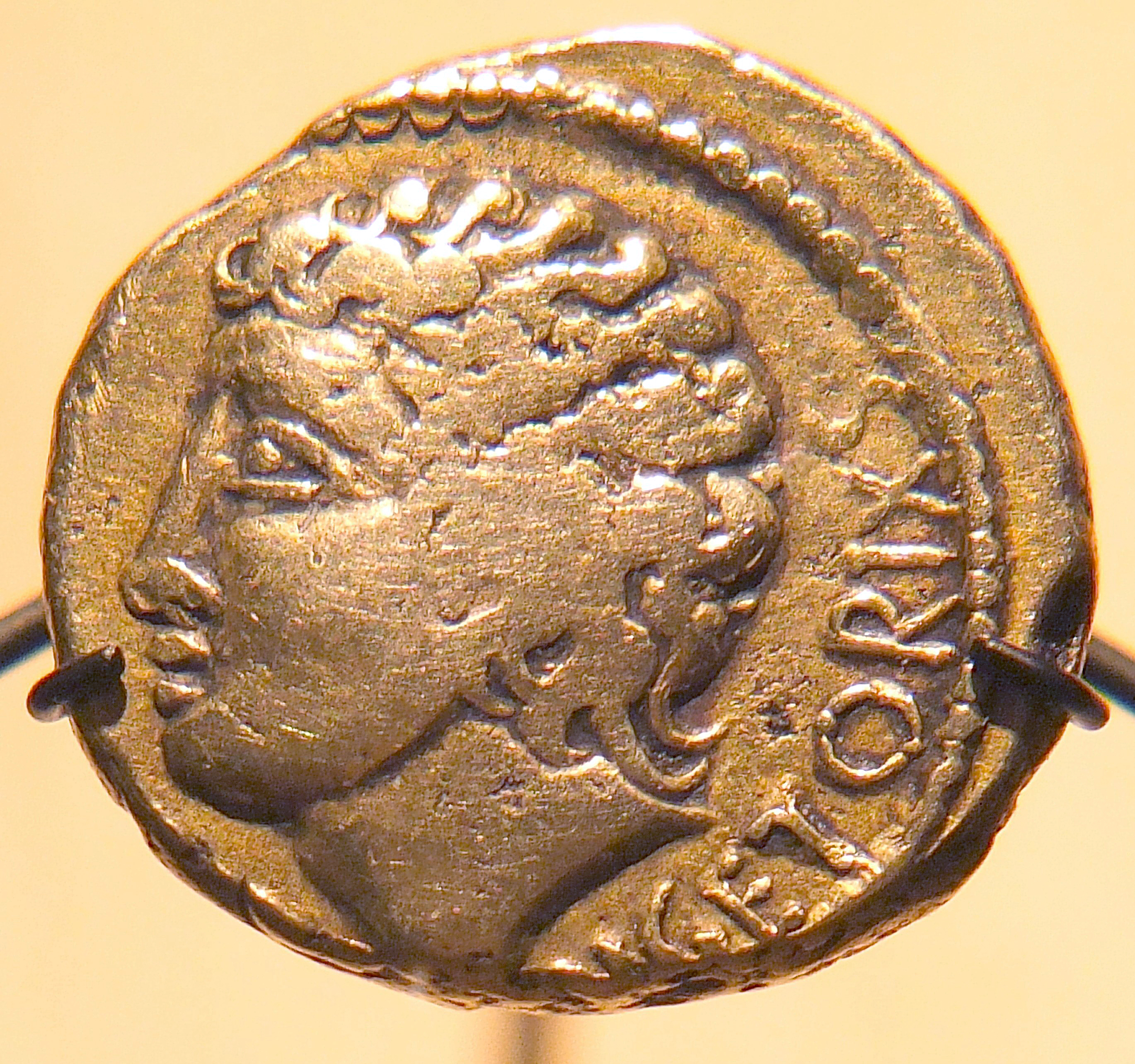
A coin depicting Vercingetorix

The Treasure of Pionsat is a collection of Arverni coins discovered in 1852 at Pionsat in Puy-de-Dôme, France. The coins date from the middle of the first century BC.

The treasure had been buried a few kilometers from the open pit gold mines at Combrailles . At the time of the 1852 discovery, 200 to 300 coins were counted, but most of them soon vanished. Today only 51 certified coins exist in public and private collections. Twenty-one of the coins are at the National Library of France.

The discovery provides the most important historical source for the coinage of Arverni, especially of those attributed to Vercingétorix . A study by Sylvia Nieto and Jean-Noël Barrandon regarding Arverni coinage reported that there are 137 extant coins, 27 in the name of Vercingétorix. Of these, 16 are part of this treasure.
