= Archbishop Lamy's Chapel =

- U.S. National Register of Historic Places
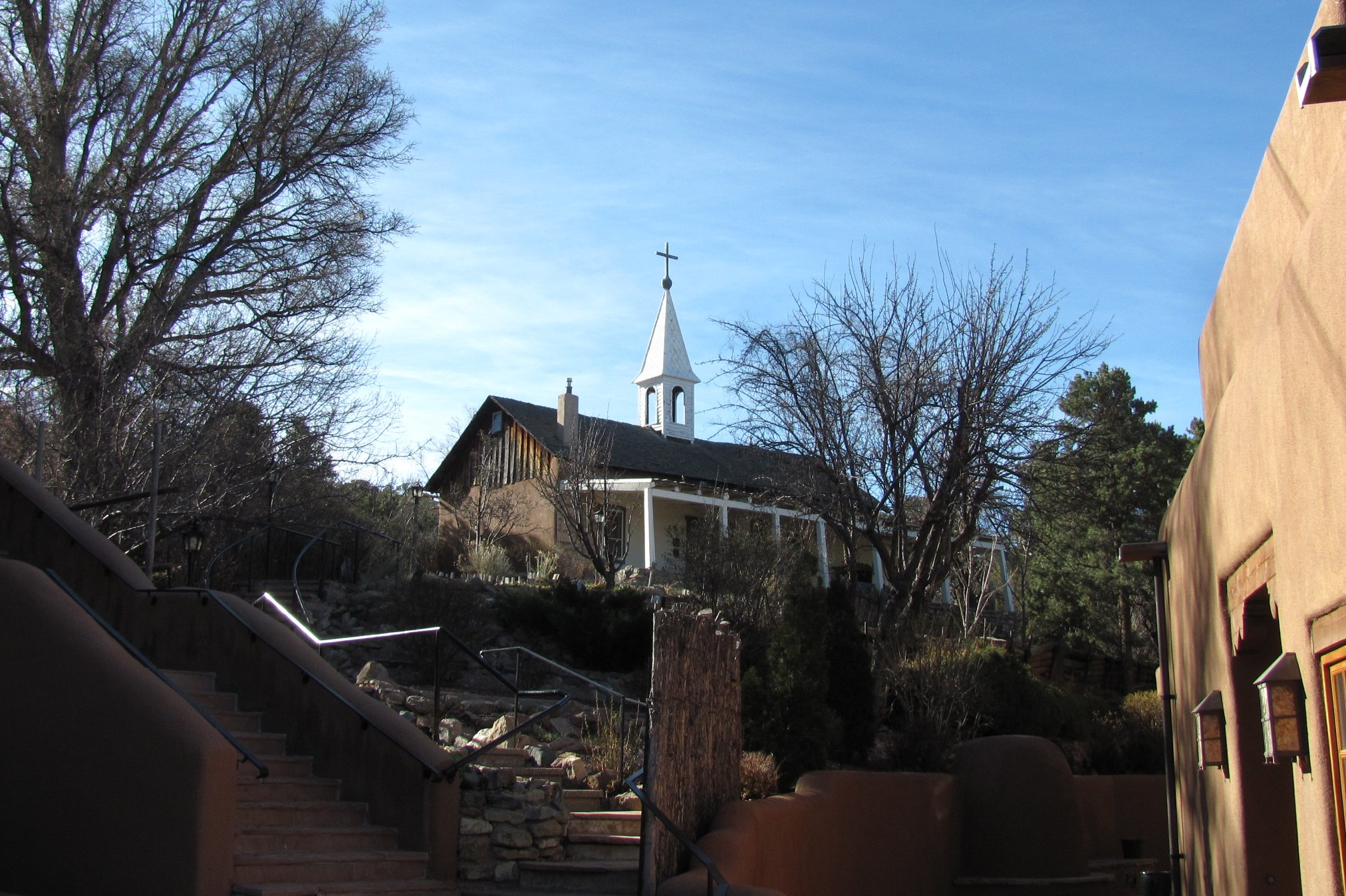

- Location within New Mexico Location within the United States
- Location: Bishop's Lodge Rd., Tesuque, New Mexico
- Coordinates: 35°43′50″N 105°54′32″W
- Area: 0.1 acres (0.040 ha)
- Built: 1874
- Built by: Archbishop Jean Baptiste Lamy
- NRHP reference No.: 88000897
- Added to NRHP: August 19, 1988

Archbishop Lamy's Chapel, on Bishop's Lodge Rd. in Tesuque, New Mexico, was built in 1874. It was listed on the National Register of Historic Places in 1988.

It was built by Archbishop Jean Baptiste Lamy for use as a retreat from his duties as the representative of the church.

It has adobe walls.
