= Saint-Maurice-près-Pionsat =

- Commune
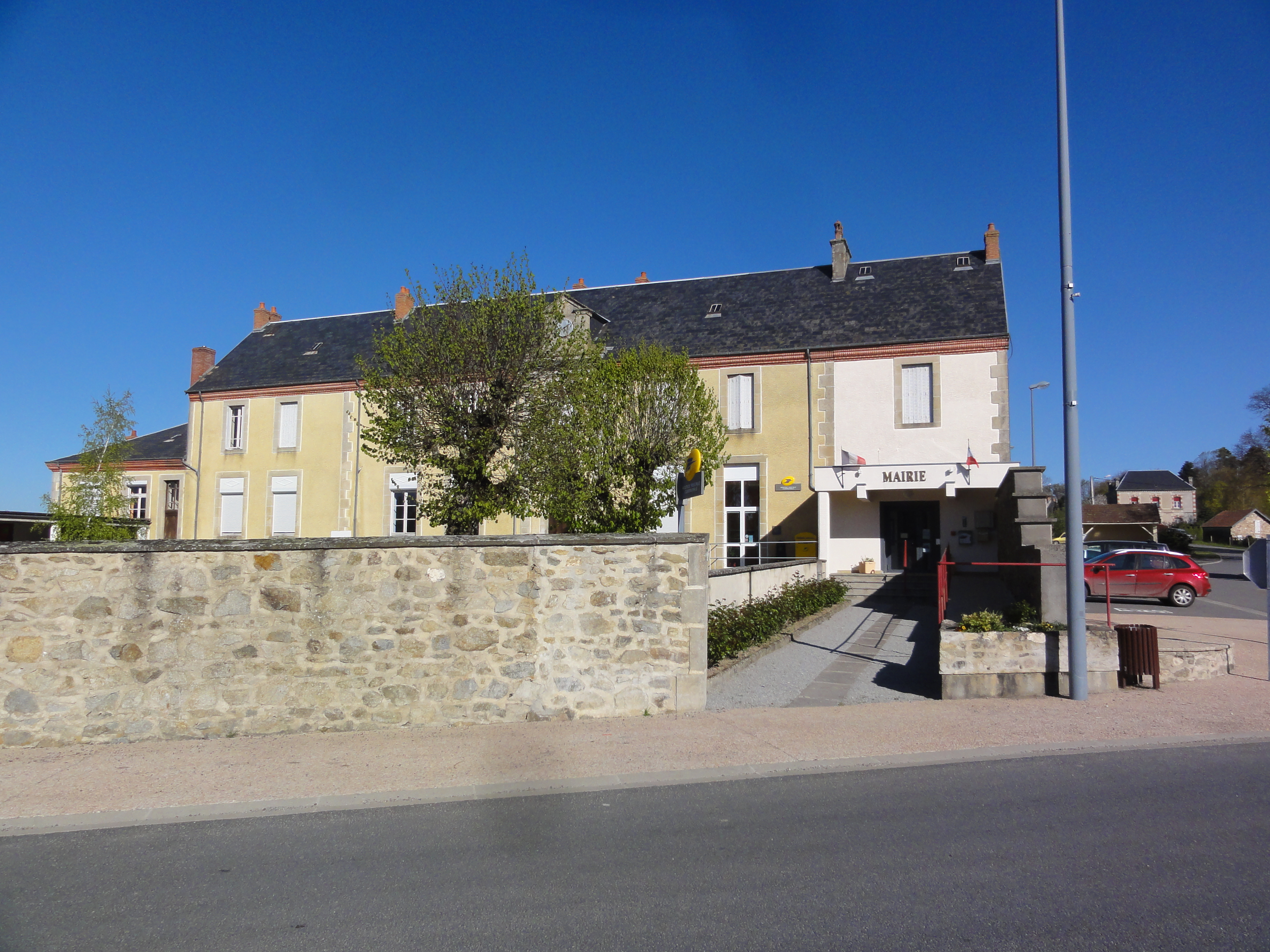
- The town hall in Saint-Maurice-près-Pionsat
- Location of Saint-Maurice-près-Pionsat
- Location within France Location within Auvergne-Rhône-Alpes
- Coordinates: 46°03′58″N 2°36′04″E
- Country: France
- Region: Auvergne-Rhône-Alpes
- Department: Puy-de-Dôme
- Arrondissement: Riom
- Canton: Saint-Éloy-les-Mines
- Intercommunality: CC Pays de Saint-Éloy

Government
  - Mayor (2020–2026): François Brunet
- Area^{1}: 30.88 km^{2} (11.92 sq mi)
- Elevation: 620 m (2,030 ft)
- Highest elevation: 654 m (2,146 ft)
- Lowest elevation: 400 m (1,300 ft)
- Population (2023): 358
  - Density: 11.6/km^{2} (30.0/sq mi)
- Time zone: UTC+01:00 (CET)
  - Summer (DST): UTC+02:00 (CEST)
- INSEE/Postal code: 63377 /63330
- ^{1} French Land Register data, which excludes lakes, ponds, glaciers > 1 km^{2} (0.386 sq mi or 247 acres) and river estuaries.

Saint-Maurice-près-Pionsat (French pronunciation: [sɛ̃ mɔʁis pʁɛ pjɔ̃sa], lit. 'Saint-Maurice near Pionsat'; Auvergnat: Sent Mauïse) is a commune in the Puy-de-Dôme department in Auvergne in central France.

== See also ==
- Communes of the Puy-de-Dôme department
