= Archdiocese of Santa Fe =

Roman Catholic archdiocese in New Mexico, USA

Coordinates: 35°07′42″N 106°41′49″W

Archdiocese of Santa Fe Archidioecesis Sanctae Fidei in America Septentrionali Arquidiócesis de Santa Fe
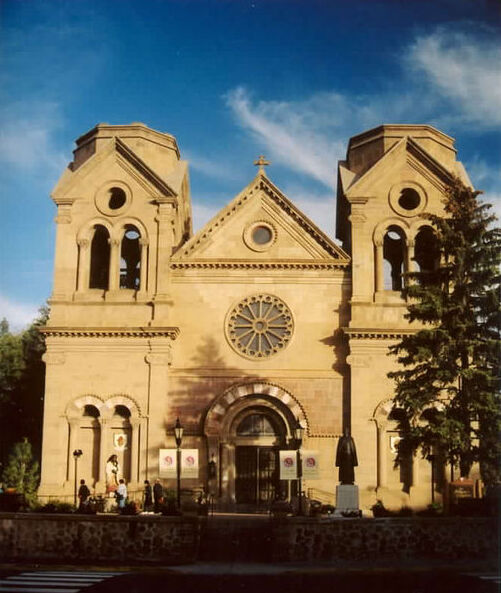
- Cathedral Basilica of St. Francis of Assisi

- Coat of arms

Location
- Country: United States
- Territory: 19 counties in Northeastern New Mexico
- Ecclesiastical province: Santa Fe

Statistics
- Area: 61,142 sq mi (158,360 km^{2})
- Population: Total; Catholics: (as of 2014); 1,473,000; 323,850 (22%)
- Parishes: 93

Information
- Denomination: Catholic
- Sui iuris church: Latin Church
- Rite: Roman Rite
- Established: July 19, 1850 (175 years ago)
- Cathedral: Cathedral Basilica of St. Francis of Assisi
- Patron saint: St. Francis of Assisi

Current leadership
- Pope: Leo XIV
- Archbishop: John Charles Wester
- Vicar General: Glennon Jones
- Judicial Vicar: Ron Walters, OFM

Map
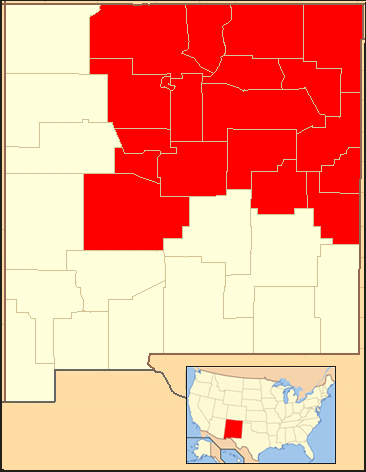

Website
- archdiosf.org

The Archdiocese of Santa Fe (Latin: Archidioecesis Sanctae Fidei in America Septentrionali, Spanish: Arquidiócesis de Santa Fe) is a Catholic archdiocese in the southwestern region of the United States in the state of New Mexico. While the mother church of the archdiocese, the Cathedral Basilica of St. Francis of Assisi, is in the city of Santa Fe, its administrative center is in the city of Albuquerque, approximately sixty miles away. The current archbishop is John Charles Wester.

== Territory ==
The Diocese of New Mexico comprises the counties of Rio Arriba, Taos, Colfax, Union, Mora, Harding, Los Alamos, Sandoval, Santa Fe, San Miguel, Quay, Bernalillo, Valencia, Socorro, Torrance, Guadalupe, De Baca, Roosevelt, and Curry.

== History ==
=== Spanish jurisdiction 1500 to 1821 ===
==== Early years ====
The history of Catholicism in New Mexico began in the early 17th century, with the arrival of the Spanish settlers. Spanishs conquistadors had passed through the region in search of gold and silver as early as 1527. However, there were no Spanish settlements until 1598, when the explorer Juan de Oñate arrived from New Spain with 500 Spanish settlers in present-day Santa Fe.

De Oñate was accompanied by ten Franciscan priests who built the first Spanish missions in New Mexico. By 1608, the Franciscans had converted over 7,000 Puebloans to Catholicism. The Franciscans in 1610 constructed the San Miguel Mission in Santa Fe with labor provided by Tlaxcalans from Mexico. It is considered one of the oldest churches in the United States.

While they attended mass and followed other Catholic traditions, the Puebloans continued to practice rituals and customs from their own religion. The Franciscans attempted to outlaw the use of entheogenic drugs in Puebloan religious ceremonies and seized Puebloan masks, prayer sticks, and effigies.

During the 1650s, the Spanish governor of New Mexico, Bernardo López de Mendizábal, attempted to protect the Puebloans' rights by enforcing labor laws and allowing them to hold their own religious ceremonies. In response, the Franciscans denounced de Mendizábal to the Mexican Inquisition. He was removed from office and convicted in Mexico City of heresy.

==== Pueblo Revolt ====
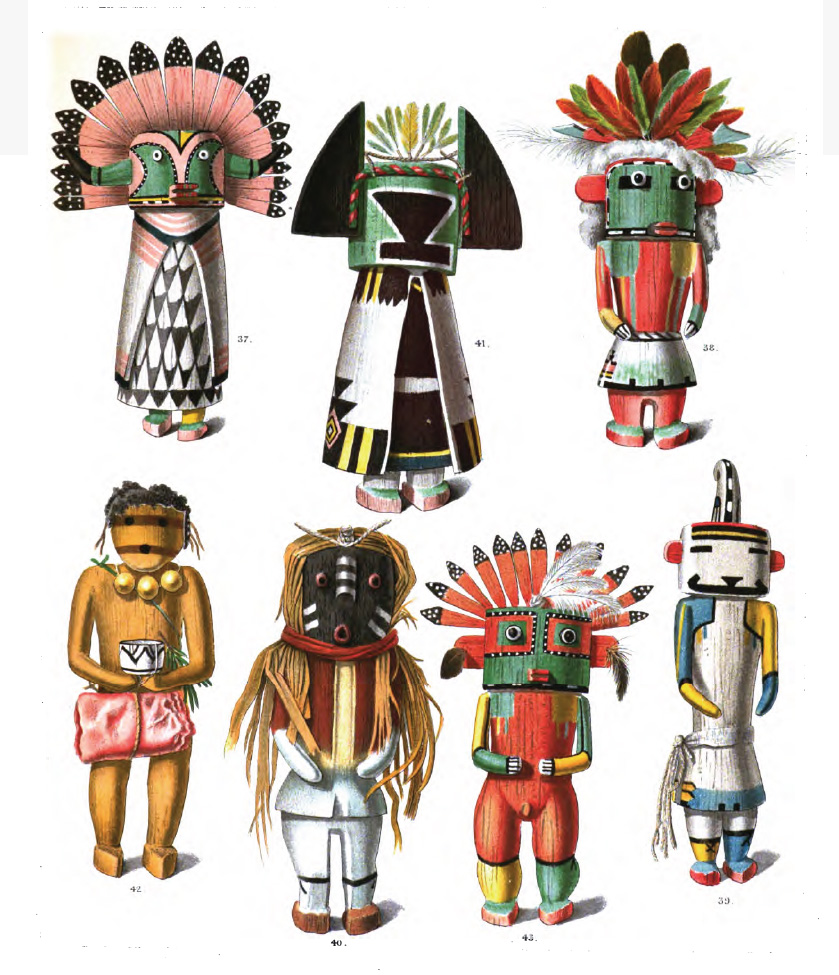
Kachina dolls used in Puebloan religious ceremonies (1894)

In 1680, the Spanish administration in Santa Fe arrested 47 Puebloan medicine men and executed three of them. Drawing on decades of anger and frustration, the Puebloan religious leader Popé in 1684 led numerous Pueblo communities into the Pueblo Revolt against the Spanish. The insurgents killed 400 Spanish inhabitants and 21 of the 33 Franciscans in the region. Popé forced the remaining 1,500 Spanish inhabitants, along with 500 of their Puebloan slaves, to flee Santa Fe to El Paso del Norte in present-day Chihuahua.

Following the Spanish retreat from New Mexico, the Puebloans destroyed all Catholic buildings and religious items, along with Spanish domestic animals and crops. Couples married in Catholic ceremonies were forced to remarry in the Puebloan religion. The insurgents finally cleansed themselves in a ritual bath

In 1692, the Spanish regained control of Santa Fe from the Puebloans and the Franciscan priests returned with them. However, the authorities now allowed the Puebloans to practice their traditional rituals, ceremonies, and religion.

=== Mexican jurisdiction 1821 to 1848 ===
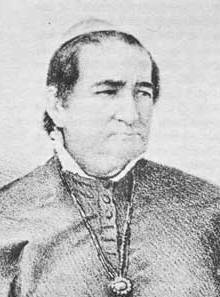
Bishop Zubiría (pre-1863)

With the end of the Mexican War of Independence in 1821, New Mexico became part of the new First Mexican Empire. New Mexico and large stretches of the future American Southwest were part of the Diocese of Durango headquartered in Durango, Mexico. The new Mexican government now started a campaign of drastically reducing the property holding of Catholic missions and restricting the religious orders. With the expulsion of Franciscan priests from Mexico, the mainly Spanish clergy were forced to leave New Mexico at this time, leaving the region without any priests for the next 12 years.

In 1833, Pope Gregory XVI appointed José Antonio Laureano de Zubiría y Escalante, a Mexican cleric, as bishop of Durango. He stated introducing Mexican priests into New Mexico.

=== American jurisdiction 1848 to present ===
==== 1848 to 1860 ====
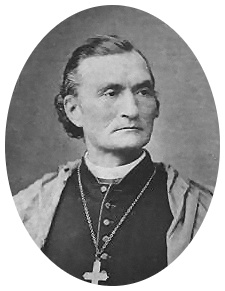
Archbishop Lamy

In 1848, Mexico ceded New Mexico, along with other territories, to the United States with the end of the Mexican–American War. As a Mexican bishop based in Mexico, Zubina's diocese now included territory that belonged to another nation.

On July 19, 1850, Pope Pius IX erected the Vicariate Apostolic of Santa Fe, which included all of the New Mexico Territory, its remaining parts of Texas and Arizona. He named Jean-Baptiste Lamy, a French cleric, as the vicar apostolic.

Lamy arrived in Santa Fe in 1851. However, Juan Felipe Ortiz, administrator of the Catholic Church in New Mexico, told Lamy that he and his Mexican priests were still under Zubiría's jurisdiction. Lamy wrote to Zubiría, asking him to resolved the conflict, but Zubiría never answered him. In November 1851, Lamy traveled to Durango and showed Zubiría the papal document of his appointment; Zubiría was forced to tell his priests that they now reported to Lamy. However, Zubiría retained jurisdiction over the parishes in Southern New Mexico. Zubiría appointed José Jesus Baca to supervise this area.

In 1853, the Vatican elevated the vicariate apostolic into the Diocese of Santa Fe, with Lamy as its first bishop. Lamy soon ran into conflict with the Mexican clergy. According to Author Anthony Mora, Lamy introduced European and American clergy to the vicariate as a way to displace Mexican priests and "Americanize" the Catholic Church there. This created tension between Lamy and the Mexican-American congregants and clergy. Many of the non-Mexican priests believed that assimilation to American culture was vital, and they used racist ideas to justify the changes that they were making in the diocese.

One of Lamy's controversial actions was the outlawing of the Penitente Brotherhood. The Penitentes became popular in New Mexico in the 1820s following Mexican independence. The Catholic hierarchy in Rome was uncomfortable with the Penitentes, mainly because of their practice of flagellation. Lamy also banned concubinage by the clergy and excommunicated five Mexican priests who were in sexual relationships with women. These priests included José Manuel Gallegos, who later served in the US House of Representatives. Lamy started construction of a new St. Francis cathedral with European styles instead of Mexican ones. He reinstituted tithing to the archdiocese and threatened to withhold sacraments from any congregants who refused to comply.

Antonio José Martínez from Taos, New Mexico, compiled a list of grievances against Lamy, cosigned by many Mexican priests. Lamy suspended him from performing his priestly functions, but Martinez continued to celebrate masses. Lamy finally excommunicated him in 1858.

==== 1860 to 1900 ====
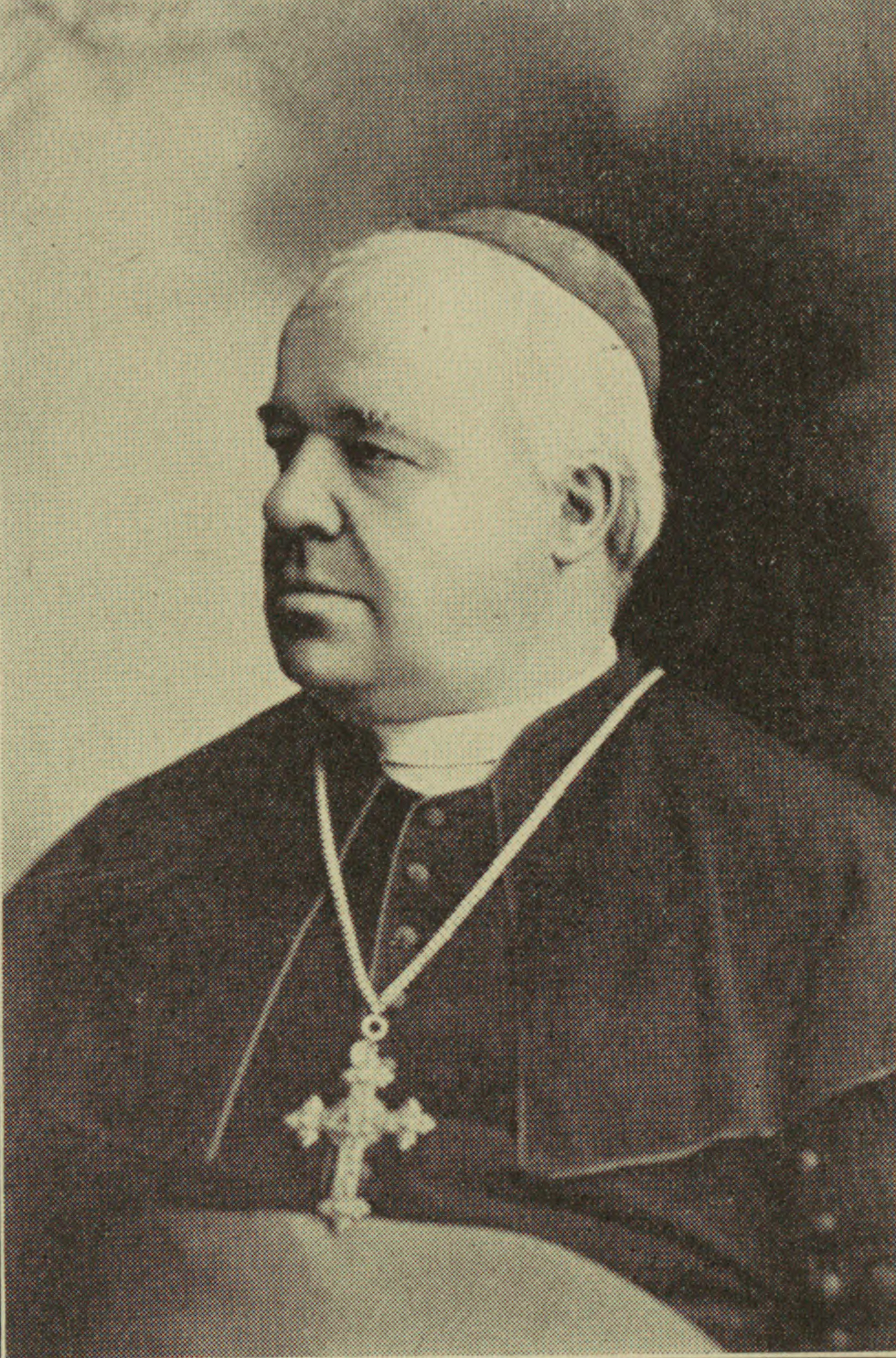
Archbishop Chapelle (1903)

The Vatican in 1868 reduced the size of the Diocese of Santa Fe by creating the Vicariate Apostolic of Arizona and the Vicariate Apostolic of Colorado-Utah. In 1875, the Vatican elevated the Diocese of Santa Fe into the Archdiocese of Santa Fe, with Lamy as its first archbishop.

The Mexican-Americans who controlled over the southern New Mexico parishes gradually began to lose power to the archdiocese. This time period proved to be a time of intense conflict between the Mexican Americans and the Euro-Americans. The Mexican Americans living in this area dealt with extreme difficulties as a result of their faith.

On February 19, 1885, Pope Leo XIII named Bishop Jean-Baptiste Salpointe from the Apostolic Vicariate of Arizona as coadjutor archbishop of Santa Fe to assist Lamy. When Lamy retired on July 18; Salpointe automatically succeeded him. On August 21, 1891, Placide Chapelle from the Archdiocese of Baltimore was appointed by Leo XIII as coadjutor archbishop in Santa Fe to assist Salpointe. When Salpointe retired, Chapelle became the new archbishop on January 7, 1894.

In 1894, Chapelle persuaded Mother Katharine Drexel to reopen St. Catherine's Indian School, a boarding school for Native American children in Santa Fe, under the control of the Sisters of the Blessed Sacrament. He consecrated the then-unfinished Cathedral of St. Francis of Assisi in October 1895. Chapelle confirmed approximately 40,000 people during his six years in New Mexico.

Leo XIII named Chapelle as archbishop of the Archdiocese of New Orleans in 1897. To replace him in Santa Fe, the pope appointed Bishop Peter Bourgade of the Diocese of Tucson.

==== 1900 to 1930 ====
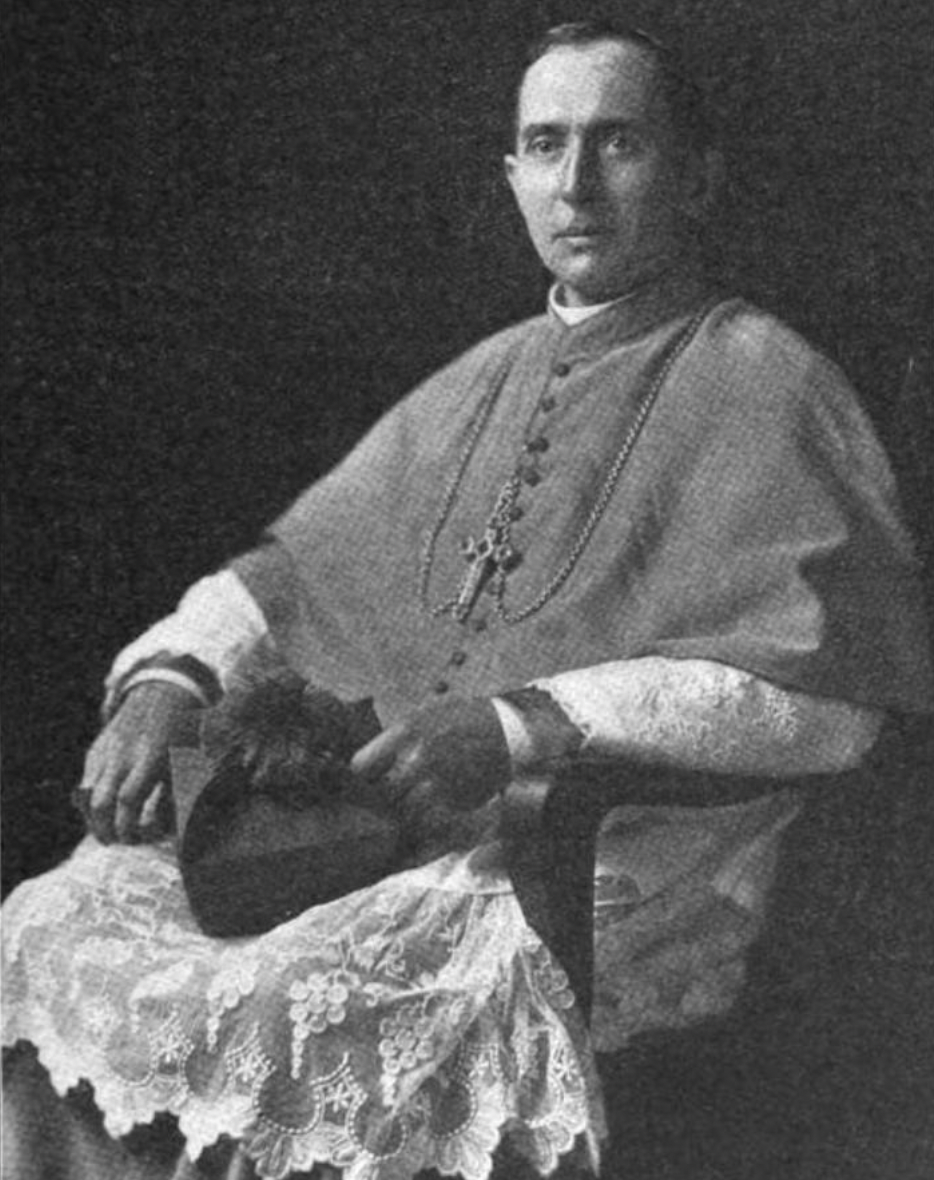
Archbishop Daeger (1921)

Bourgade served as archbishop for nine years. His final annual report to the Vatican showed the archdiocese contained a Catholic population of 167,000 people, served by 45 churches with resident priests and 340 missions. Bourgade was in poor health for most of his tenure; to assist him, the Vatican named John Pitaval from the Diocese of Denver as an auxiliary bishop in Santa Fe in 1902.

After Bourgade died in 1908, Pope Pius X appointed Pitaval as archbishop of Santa Fe. He founded St. Anthony's Orphanage at Albuquerque, New Mexico, and St. Mary's Hospital at Gallup, New Mexico. He also erected the bronze statue of Lamy outside the Cathedral of St. Francis of Assisi. Following Pitaval's retirement in 1918, the archdiocese had over 140,000 Catholics, 80 priests, 46 parishes, 356 missions, 26 parochial schools, and five hospitals.

The next archbishop of Santa Fe was Albert Daeger, named by Pope Benedict XV in 1919. He was the first American-born archbishop of Santa Fe; all of his predecessors came from France.

==== 1930 to 1950 ====
By the time of Daeger's death in 1932, the archdiocese was served by 106 priests operating 56 parishes and 306 missions. The archdiocese also ran 35 schools.

Pope Pius XI named Bishop Rudolph Gerken from the Diocese of Amarillo as the seventh archbishop of Santa Fe on June 2, 1933. As archbishop, Gerken established another diocese and several parishes, sought to provide relief to American prisoners of war in Japan during World War II, and presided over the marriage of actress Jane Wyatt and Edgar Ward in 1935. In December 1937, Gerken called on Catholics in the archdiocese to boycott a Christmas ball sponsored by the Santa Fe Maternal Health Center, terming the organization a "birth control clinic." Gerken died in 1943.

Pope Pius XII appointed Bishop Edwin Byrne from the Diocese of San Juan as the eighth archbishop of Santa Fe on June 12, 1943.

==== 1950 to 2000 ====
During his 20-year-long tenure, Byrne was instrumental in the construction of many churches and schools, and built up the diocesan clergy. In 1957, he prohibited Catholic high school students from dating, describing "going steady, keeping steady company, necking and kissing" as "pagan" practices.

In 1958, Byrne's decree that no Catholic girl should appear in a bathing suit in the Miss New Mexico pageant received national attention and stirred controversy; he never rescinded the ban. He condemned a "right to work" bill being considered in the state legislature. Byrne attended the first session of the Second Vatican Council in Rome 1962. Byrne died in 1963. In 1964, Pope Paul VI named Archbishop James Peter Davis from the Archdiocese of San Juan as the next archbishop of Santa Fe.

Davis retired as archbishop of Santa Fe in 1974. Pope Paul VI appointed Robert Fortune Sanchez as the first Hispanic archbishop of Santa Fe on July 1, 1974. He established models for outreach to ethnic minorities and apologized for the treatment of Native Americans of the Southwest by the Catholic Church. Sanchez consecrated the first Native American bishop in the Catholic Church, Donald Pelotte. Sanchez resigned as archbishop of Santa Fe in 1993 after admitting to sexual relationships with several women.

==== 2000 to present ====
The archdiocese announced it would file for bankruptcy protection in November 2018, in the wake of dozens of ongoing lawsuits stemming from a sexual abuse scandal that stretches back decades. A new investigation was also ordered by the state's attorney general into the Catholic Church's handling of misconduct by its clergy. In June 2019, the archdiocese filed for Chapter 11 bankruptcy after announcing that 395 individuals were suing it for past sexual abuse allegations.

Prior to filing for bankruptcy, the archdiocese transferred assets worth over $150 million into trusts and its incorporated parishes. In October 2020, a bankruptcy judge ruled that abuse survivors could file lawsuits alleging these transfers were a fraudulent attempt to avoid bigger payouts to victims. It has also been alleged that such a strategy fits into a larger pattern of similar asset-shielding from abuse-related bankruptcy filings nationwide by the Catholic Church.

As of April 2024, the archdiocese remains in bankruptcy.

== Bishops ==
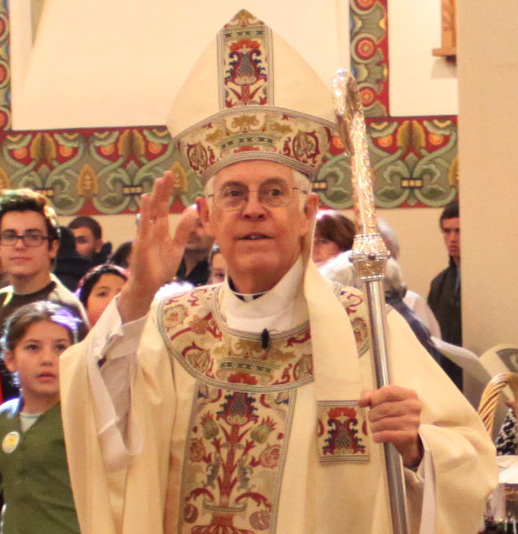
Archbishop Sheehan (2013)

=== Vicar Apostolic of New Mexico ===
Jean-Baptiste Lamy (1850–1853), title changed to bishop of Santa Fe with the erection of the diocese

=== Bishop of Santa Fe ===
Jean Baptiste Lamy (1853–1875) elevated to archbishop

=== Archbishops of Santa Fe ===
1. Jean-Baptiste Lamy (1875–1885)
2. Jean-Baptiste Salpointe (1885–1894; coadjutor archbishop 1884–1884)
3. Placide Louis Chapelle (1894–1897; coadjutor archbishop 1891–1894), appointed Archbishop of New Orleans and later apostolic delegate to Cuba and Puerto Rico and extraordinary envoy to the Philippines
4. Peter Bourgade (1899–1908)
5. John Baptist Pitaval (1909–1918)
6. Albert Daeger, OFM (1919–1932)
7. Rudolph Gerken (1933–1943)
8. Edwin Byrne (1943–1963)
9. James Peter Davis (1964–1974)
10. Robert Fortune Sanchez (1974–1993)
11. Michael Jarboe Sheehan (1993–2015)
12. John Charles Wester (2015–present)

=== Auxiliary bishops ===
- John Baptist Pitaval (1902–1909), appointed archbishop of this archdiocese
- Sidney Matthew Metzger (1939–1941), appointed Bishop of El Paso

=== Other priests of this diocese who became bishops ===
- Arthur Tafoya, appointed Bishop of Pueblo in 1980
- Jeffrey Neil Steenson, a former Episcopal bishop and later priest of this archdiocese, was appointed ordinary of the Chair of St. Peter in 2012 but could not become a Catholic bishop.

== Churches ==
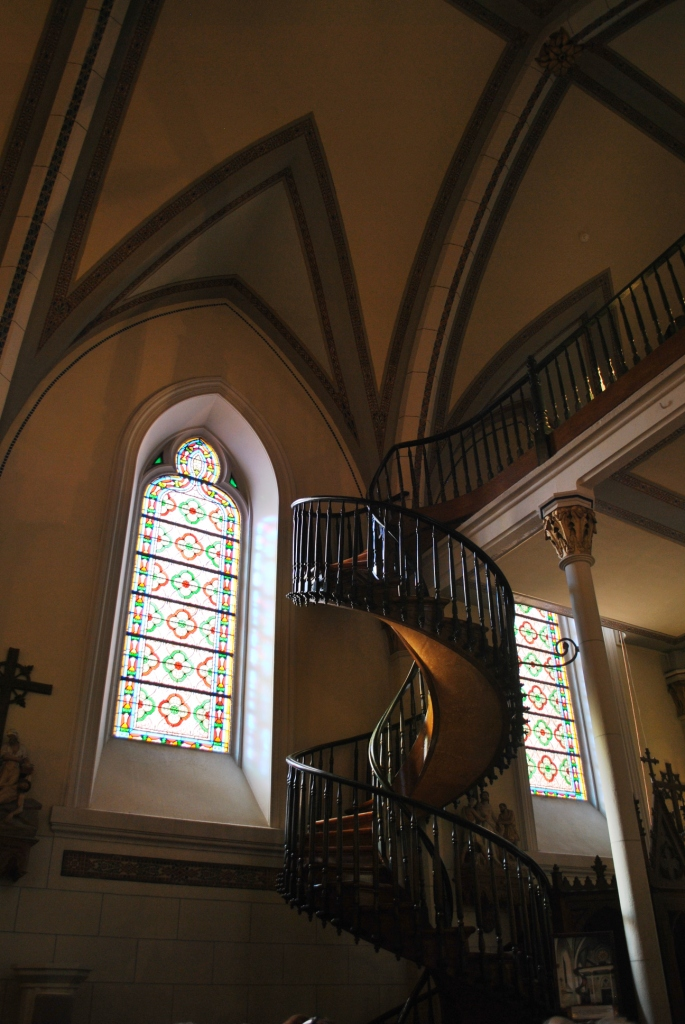
Loretto Chapel, Santa Fe, New Mexico (2012)

The archdiocese is also the home of the Loretto Chapel, which contains an ascending spiral staircase—the building of which the Sisters of Loretto consider to be a miracle due to the unusual construction of the staircase.

== Cathedral ==
=== History ===
The Cathedral Basilica of Saint Francis of Assisi is the third church to occupy the same property in Santa Fe over the last 400 years.

- The first church in Santa Fe was a chapel constructed by Franciscan Friars in 1610. It was destroyed in the Pueblo Revolt of 1680.
- The second church in Santa Fe was an adobe parish church built in 1717. It was named after Francis of Assisi.
- St. Francis Cathedral is the third church.

Archbishop Lamy started construction of Saint Francis Cathedral in 1869, but it was not dedicated until 1887. Lamy is entombed in the sanctuary floor of the cathedral. A bronze statue of Lamy, dedicated in 1925, stands outside the front entrance of the cathedral.

In 2005, Archbishop Sheehan announced that Pope Benedict XVI had designated the cathedral as a minor basilica.

=== Description ===
The cathedral was built in a Romanesque style that was common in France. The interior reflects the pastel colors of New Mexico; The pews are made of blonde wood, and the walls and columns are painted a dusky pink with pale-green trimmings. Stone for the building was mined from Lamy, New Mexico. The stained glass windows, which depict the 12 apostles, was imported from France. The cathedral was designed to have two spires rising from the bell towers, but they were never built due to the cost.

=== Our Lady Conquistadora Chapel ===
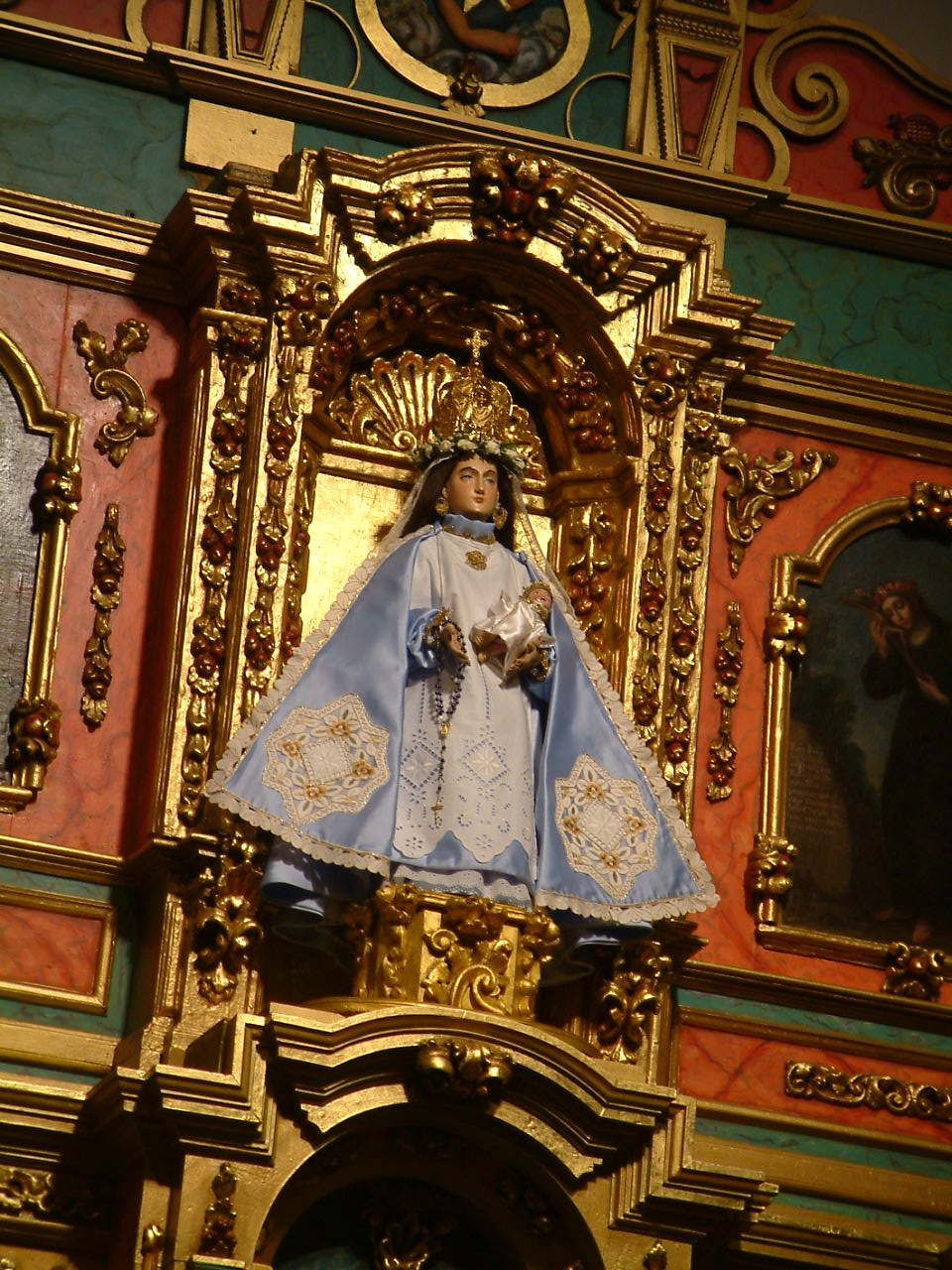
La Conquistadora statue (2018)

The Our Lady Conquistadora Chapel is all that remains of the second St. Francis Church. Built in 1714, this tiny chapel houses La Conquistadora, the oldest Madonna statue in the United States. It was brought to Santa Fe by the Franciscans in 1626.

=== Blessed Sacrament Chapel ===
The archdiocese in 1987 added the Blessed Sacrament Chapel to the cathedral. It's dedicated commemorated the 100th anniversary of the cathedral. The chapel contains a large altar screen that depicts several saints of North and South America.

== Education ==
=== High schools ===
- St. Michael's High School – Santa Fe
- St. Pius X High School – Albuquerque

== Suffragan sees ==
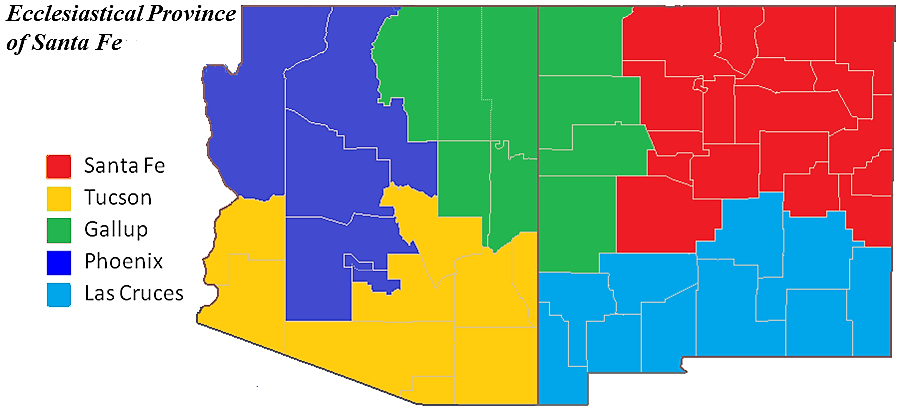
Ecclesiastical Province of Santa Fe

- Gallup
- Las Cruces
- Phoenix
- Tucson

== See also ==
- Anton Docher
- Catholic Church by country
- Catholic Church in the United States
- Ecclesiastical Province of Santa Fe
- Catholic Church by country
- Jean-Baptiste Lamy
- List of Catholic archdioceses (by country and continent)
- List of Catholic dioceses (alphabetical) (including archdioceses)
- List of Catholic dioceses (structured view) (including archdioceses)
- List of Catholic cathedrals in the United States
- List of Catholic dioceses in the United States
- Loretto Chapel
