= Pionsat =

- Commune
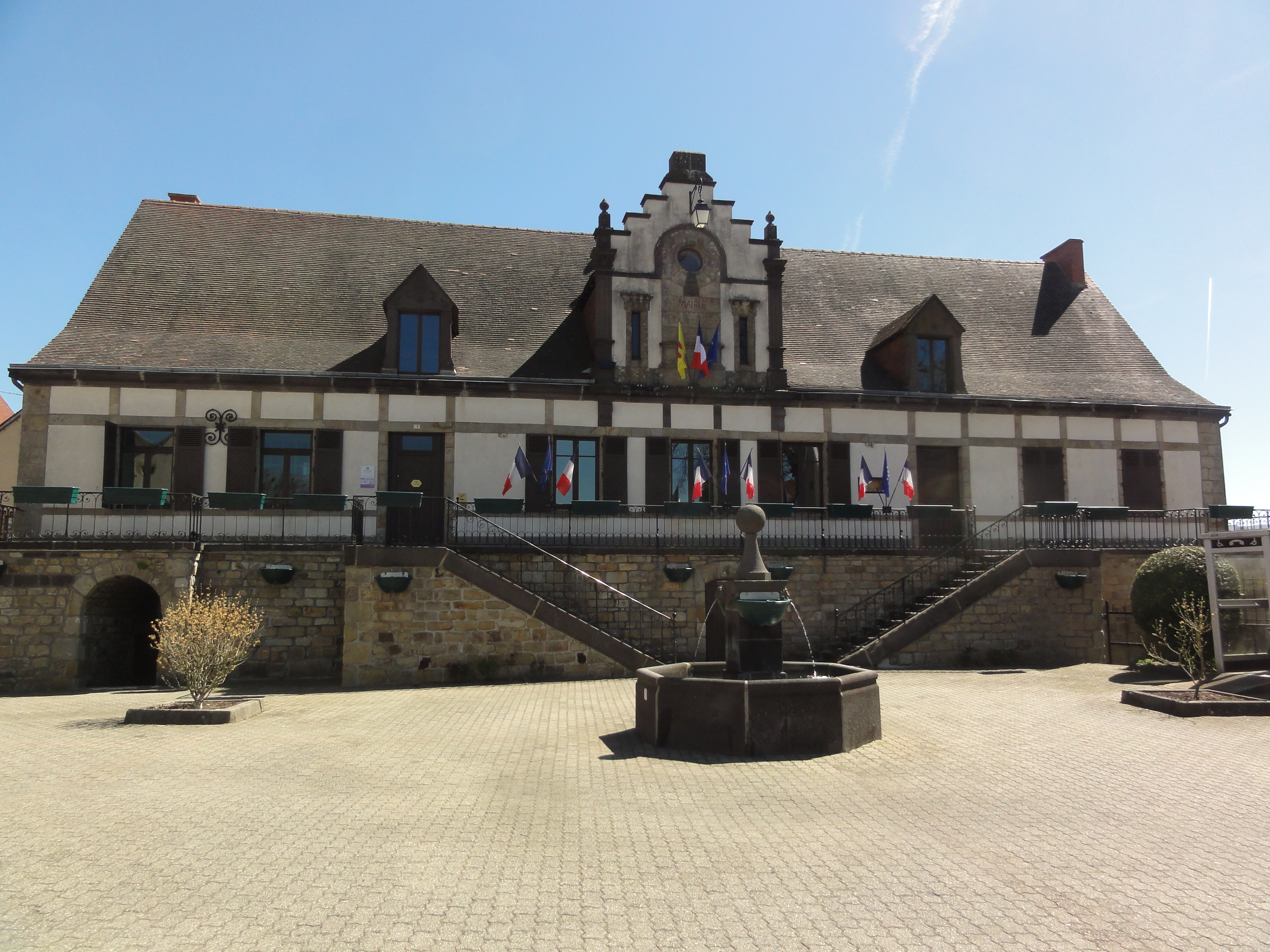
- The town hall in Pionsat

- Coat of arms
- Location of Pionsat
- Location within France Location within Auvergne-Rhône-Alpes
- Coordinates: 46°06′36″N 2°41′35″E
- Country: France
- Region: Auvergne-Rhône-Alpes
- Department: Puy-de-Dôme
- Arrondissement: Riom
- Canton: Saint-Éloy-les-Mines
- Intercommunality: CC Pays de Saint-Éloy

Government
  - Mayor (2026–32): Jérôme Gaumet
- Area^{1}: 24.68 km^{2} (9.53 sq mi)
- Elevation: 535 m (1,755 ft)
- Highest elevation: 663 m (2,175 ft)
- Lowest elevation: 458 m (1,503 ft)
- Population (2023): 1,042
  - Density: 42.22/km^{2} (109.4/sq mi)
- Time zone: UTC+01:00 (CET)
  - Summer (DST): UTC+02:00 (CEST)
- INSEE/Postal code: 63281 /63330
- ^{1} French Land Register data, which excludes lakes, ponds, glaciers > 1 km^{2} (0.386 sq mi or 247 acres) and river estuaries.

Pionsat (French pronunciation: [pjɔ̃sa]; Occitan: Pionsat) is a commune in the Puy-de-Dôme department in Auvergne in central France.

== See also ==
- Communes of the Puy-de-Dôme department
- Treasure of Pionsat
