= Andrea Bacigalupa =

American artist and writer (1923–2015)

- Born: May 26, 1923; Baltimore, MD
- Died: March 22, 2015 (aged 91); Santa Fe, NM
- Resting place: Arlington National Cemetery, VA
- Known for: Liturgical Artist
- Notable work: San Francisco de Asis bronze
- Spouse: Ellen Wilcox Williams Bacigalupa

Andrea (Drew) Bacigalupa (26 May 1923 in Baltimore, Maryland – 22 March 2015 in Santa Fe, New Mexico) was an American liturgical artist. Bacigalupa was a sculptor, painter, illustrator, ceramicist, multi-media artist, designer, and writer. He is known for his Santo tiles; his 1970’s newspaper column, The Coffee Break Journal; and the statue of St. Francis with a prairie dog outside city hall in Santa Fe, NM. In 2008, Mr. Bacigalupa was named a Santa Fe Living Treasure.

== Early life and World War II service ==
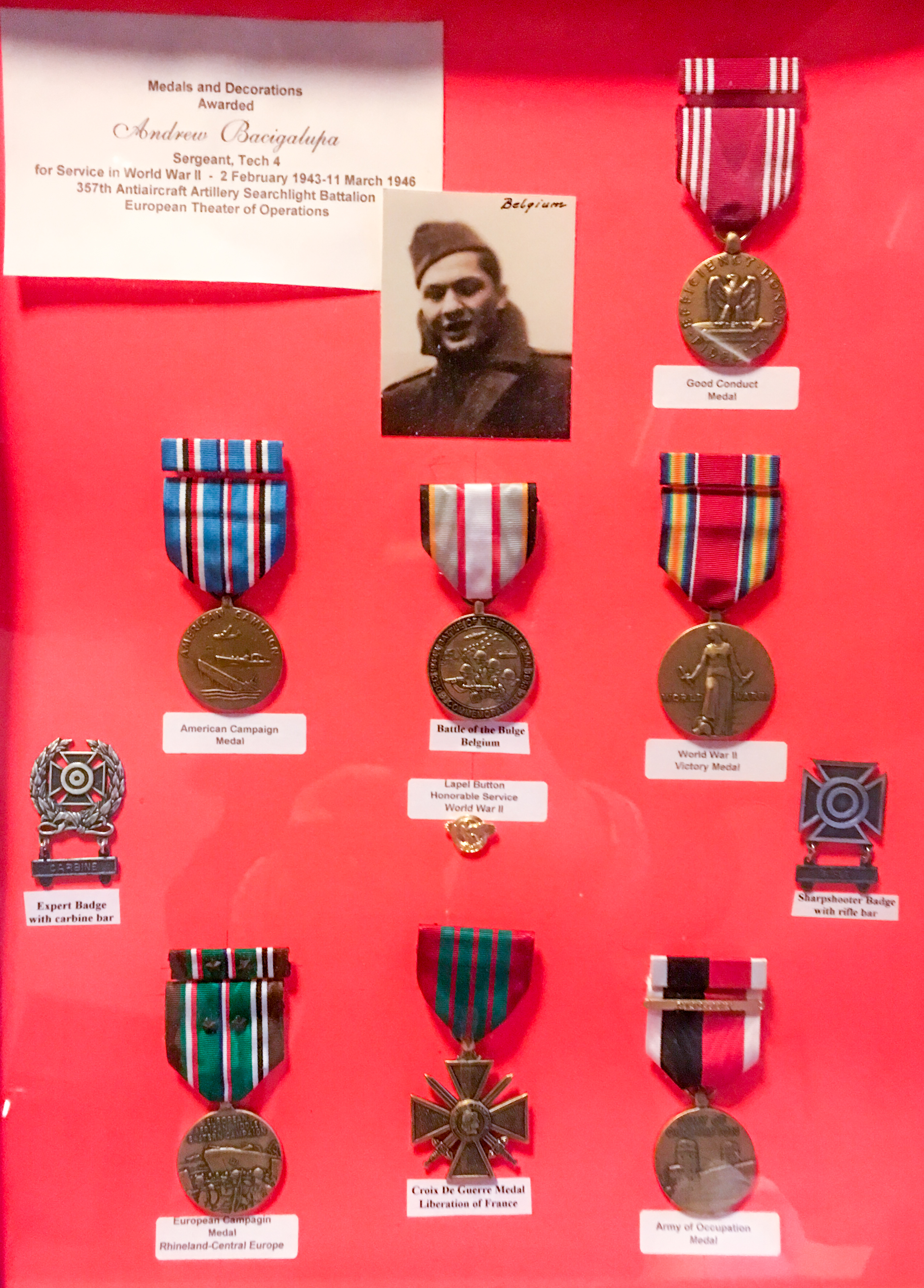
Medals earned in service during World War II

Bacigalupa was born on May 26, 1923, in Baltimore, Maryland. He was a fourth-generation Italian American. His father, Andrea Bacigalupa, was a train engineer and his mother, Maria Laura Merolla Bacigalupa, was a homemaker. Bacigalupa enlisted in the army in 1943 and served as a sergeant with the 357th Anti-Aircraft Searchlight Battalion in England, France, Belgium, and Germany; he served in the Rhineland and Central Europe campaigns and in the Battle of the Bulge.

== Education ==
After the war, Bacigalupa studied art at Biarritz American University in the South of France. With the help of the GI Bill, he was able to continue his studies at the Maryland Institute of Fine Arts, the Art Students League, Alfred University, and L’Accademia di Belli Arti in Florence, Italy. Later in life, he studied multimedia productions at the Catholic Communications Centre in Hatch End, England.

== Marriage and early career ==
Bacigalupa met Ellen Wilcox Williams of Bronxville, New York at the Art Student’s League in Woodstock, New York. The couple married in St. Patrick's Cathedral in New York City on October 9, 1952. Bacigalupa worked as an accountant for two years before the couple moved to Santa Fe in 1954. Two years later, the couple purchased and renovated an old adobe building and founded The Studio of Gian Andrea on Canyon Road, Santa Fe’s “gallery row." Up until the time of this death, Bacigalupa’s studio was the oldest continuously operating gallery on Canyon Road. Bacigalupa supplemented his gallery income by working as an illustrator for the New Mexico State Engineer’s Office for 25 years.

== Artwork ==
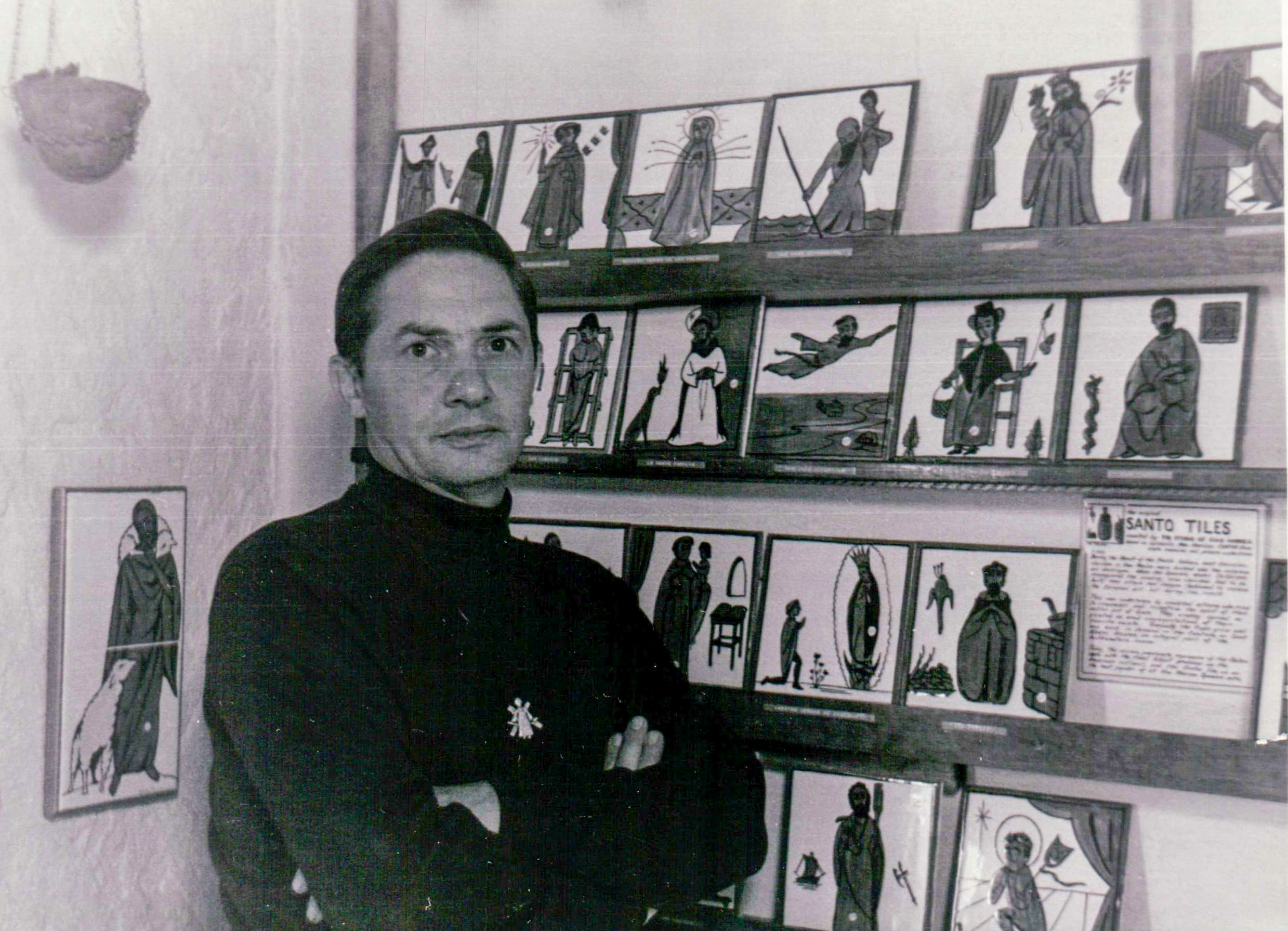
Bacigalupa with his Santo tiles in his studio on Canyon Road

After moving to Santa Fe, Bacigalupa and Ellen created ceramic jewelry, ceramic kitchen ware, and tiles, and traveled around New Mexico to sell their wares in various arts and crafts venues, as well as offering their pieces in their Canyon Road studio. Bacigalupa also painted prodigiously, often producing dark and somber images that reflected his wartime experiences. Over time, Bacigalupa focused his work on liturgical themes. He produced several wall-size mosaics for churches, began sculpting bronzes, and produced a series of tile depictions of 50 patron saints that were the best-selling item in his gallery and the subjects of a book and greeting cards produced by Sunstone Press.

During the 1970s, Bacigalupa produced multimedia slide and music shows for Liturgy in Santa Fe, a liturgical program developed by Father Blase Schauer that sought to enrich the Catholic mass with sacred art and music. Bacigalupa set slides of sacred art to music to create visual meditations that he referred to as “contemporary stained-glass windows." Bacigalupa collaborated with the Nambé foundry to produce many of his bronze sculptures. He sold smaller figures in his gallery, but he also was commissioned to produce larger bronzes for churches and other public venues. Perhaps his best-known work is his award-winning sculpture, San Francisco de Asis, depicting St. Francis of Assisi with prairie dog, which sits outside City Hall in Santa Fe, NM. Another publicly displayed bronze is his statue of Santa Maria del Lauro, which was created as a tribute to his mother and his maternal ancestors from Meta di Sorrento. The statue now sits in a small piazza in front of the Basilica of Santa Maria del Lauro in Meta di Sorrento, Italy. Bacigalupa co-founded the sister city relationship between Santa Fe and Sorrento, which was established in 1995.

Bacigalupa designed sacred spaces for churches in Kansa, Nebraska, Texas, Colorado, and New Mexico, including St. Laurence Catholic Church in Amarillo, Texas. In addition to designing building interiors, he enhanced sacred spaces with crucifixes, processional crosses, baptismal fonts, stations of the cross, doors, stained glass windows, and etched glass panels.

== Writing ==
Bacigalupa produced a column called “The Coffee Break Journal” for The Santa Fe New Mexican for four years. In the column, Bacigalupa recounted different life events and reflected on war, family life, and the human experience. Some of the columns were re-produced as a book by Our Sunday Visitor press, Journal of an Itinerant Artist.

Bacigalupa also wrote Seven Carols, Seven Gifts: Christmas Stories for All Ages and several children’s books: A Good and Perfect Gift, The Song of Guadalupana, and Franco and Pirata. In 1988, A Good and Perfect Gift was made into a movie by Tony Frangakis. The movie was filmed in Truchas, N.M.

== Museum holdings ==
- Dies Israe, bronze, New Mexico Museum of Art, Santa Fe, NM
- Cristo del Desierto, painting, New Mexico Museum of Art, Santa Fe, NM
- Tile Crucifix, Taylor-Mesilla Historic Property, Las Cruces, NM
