= Jean-Baptiste Lamy =

French Catholic bishop in the United States

The Most Reverend Jean-Baptiste Lamy
- Archbishop of Santa Fe
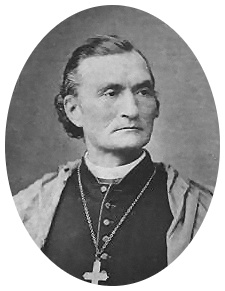
- Church: Catholic
- Archdiocese: Santa Fe
- In office: July 29, 1853 – July 19, 1885
- Successor: Jean-Baptiste Salpointe
- Other posts: Vicar Apostolic of New Mexico (1850–1853); Bishop of Santa Fe (1853–1855)

Personal details
- Born: October 11, 1814 Lempdes, Puy-de-Dôme, France
- Died: February 13, 1888 (aged 73) Santa Fe, New Mexico, United States
- Buried: Cathedral Basilica of Saint Francis of Assisi
- Signature: Jean-Baptiste Lamy's signature

Ordination history of Jean-Baptiste Lamy
History
Priestly ordination
- Date: December 22, 1838
Episcopal consecration
- Principal consecrator: Martin John Spalding
- Co-consecrators: Jacques-Maurice De Saint Palais, Louis Amadeus Rappe
- Date: November 24, 1850
Episcopal succession
Bishops consecrated by Jean-Baptiste Lamy as principal consecrator
- Peter Bourgade: May 1, 1885

Jean-Baptiste Lamy (French pronunciation: [ʒɑ̃ batist lami]; October 11, 1814 – February 13, 1888), was a French-American Catholic prelate who served as the first Archbishop of Santa Fe, New Mexico. Willa Cather's novel Death Comes for the Archbishop is based on his life and career (albeit renamed "Jean-Marie Latour" for artistic license), as is Paul Horgan's nonfiction work Lamy of Santa Fe. He sometimes anglicised his name to John Baptist Lamy.

== Early life ==
Lamy was born in Lempdes, Puy-de-Dôme, in the Auvergne region of France, 10 km east of the main regional city of Clermont-Ferrand. He completed his classical studies in the minor seminary at Clermont and theological coursework in the Major seminary at Montferrand, where he was trained by the Sulpician Fathers (Society of Saint-Sulpice).

== Career ==
He was ordained a priest on December 22, 1838. After a few months as an assistant priest in his native diocese, in 1839 Lamy asked for and obtained permission to answer the call for missionaries of Bishop John Baptist Purcell of Cincinnati. From 1839 to 1847, he served as the primary missionary priest for St. Luke's in Danville, Ohio, a small community in Knox County. While there he established the first Catholic church in nearby Mount Vernon and the St. Joseph Mission in neighboring Holmes County, while serving Catholic congregations in Loudonville, Coshocton, and Newark.

== Episcopacy ==
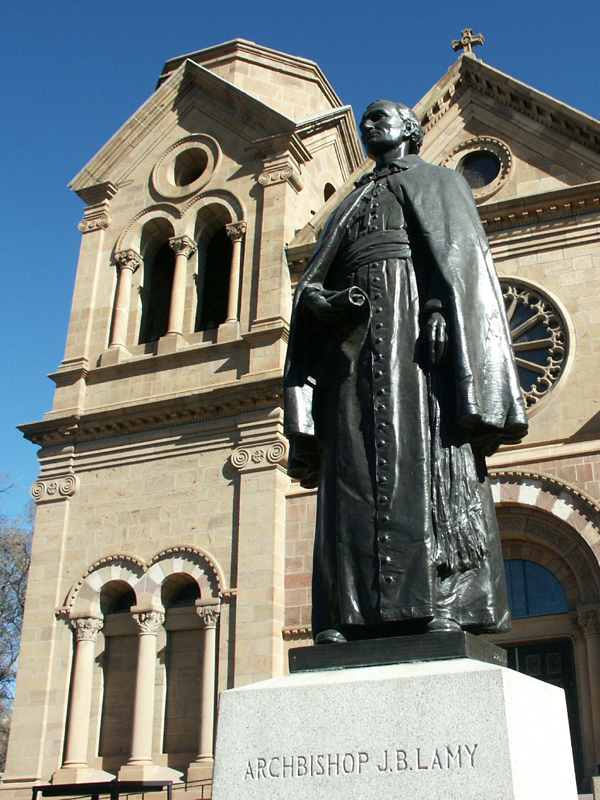
Bronze statue of Lamy in front of St. Francis Cathedral

While serving as a missionary in North America, serving at several missions in Ohio and Kentucky, on July 23, 1850, he was notified that Pope Pius IX was appointing him as bishop of the recently created Apostolic Vicariate of New Mexico, created as a result of the outcome of the Mexican American War, which created a need for the American Catholic Church to replace prelates and leadership previously provided by the Church in Mexico. At the same time, he was appointed Titular Bishop of Agathonice. He was consecrated a bishop on November 24, 1850, by Archbishop Martin Spalding of Louisville; Bishops Jacques-Maurice De Saint Palais of Vincennes and Louis Amadeus Rappe of Cleveland served as co-consecrators.

After an arduous journey on primitive transportation, Lamy reached Santa Fe in the summer of 1851. As such, Lamy was joining a long list of French people who explored, traded in, and settled in New Mexico since the 16th century.

Lamy entered Santa Fe on 9 August 1851 and was welcomed by the Governor of the territory, James S. Calhoun, and many other citizens. However, Juan Felipe Ortiz, a Spanish priest who was responsible for administration of the Catholic Church in New Mexico, told Lamy that he and the local clergy did not recognize his authority and would remain loyal to Bishop José Antonio Laureano de Zubiría of the Diocese of Durango, Mexico, who had visited Santa Fe just a few months before. Lamy wrote to Zubiría asking him to explain the change of responsibility to the New Mexico priests. When his request was unanswered, he went in person to Durango to meet with Zubiría, showing him the papal document that appointed Lamy. In light of this, Zubiría had to agree to inform the priests of the change.

On July 23, 1853, the Vicariate of New Mexico was raised to the Diocese of Santa Fe, and Lamy was appointed its first bishop. His early efforts as bishop were directed to reforming the New Mexico church, building more churches in the territory, creating new parishes, and establishing schools. He ended the practice of concubinage widely practiced by the local priests, and he suppressed religious brotherhood societies within individual communities. He participated in the First Vatican Council from 1869 to 1870. Joseph Projectus Machebeuf served as his vicar-general. Lamy was responsible for the construction of the Cathedral Basilica of Saint Francis of Assisi (commonly known as St. Francis Cathedral) and Loretto Chapel. Both churches were built in French styles familiar to Lamy — the cathedral is Romanesque Revival, while the chapel is Neo-Gothic. On February 12, 1875, the Diocese of Santa Fe was elevated to an archdiocese with Lamy as its first archbishop. On May 1, 1885, Lamy consecrated Peter Bourgade as bishop; Bourgade would later become the fourth Archbishop of Santa Fe.

Lamy ended his tenure as bishop when he resigned in 1885. He was appointed Titular Archbishop of Cyzicus later that year.

== Death and legacies ==
He died of pneumonia in 1888 and is buried under the sanctuary floor of the basilica. A bronze statue, dedicated in 1915, stands in his memory outside the front entrance of the Basilica, and the village of Lamy, New Mexico, was named after him near the source of the sandstone for the cathedral.

Lamy was succeeded as Archbishop of Santa Fe by Jean-Baptiste Salpointe, also from Puy-de-Dôme, France.

The Archbishop Lamy's Chapel in Santa Fe, built in 1874, survives and is listed on the U.S. National Register of Historic Places.

Willa Cather's novel Death Comes for the Archbishop fictionalizes his life, missionary journeys, and the erection of the Santa Fe cathedral.

== See also ==
- Archdiocese of Santa Fe
- Catholic Church
- Cathedral Basilica of St. Francis of Assisi
- Loretto Chapel

Catholic Church titles
Preceded by Vicariate Created	Vicariate Apostolic of New Mexico; 1850–1853	Succeeded by Vicariate Changed to Diocese
Preceded by Ferdinand Oesterhoff, O.Cist.	Titular Bishop of Agathonice; 1850–1853	Succeeded by Pasquale Pagnucci, O.F.M.
Preceded by Diocese Created	Archbishop of Santa Fe; 1853–1885	Succeeded by Jean-Baptiste Salpointe
Preceded by Titular Diocese Created	Titular Archbishop of Cyzicus; 1885–1888	Succeeded by William Scarisbrick, O.S.B.
