= Henry Regis Granjon =

French-American Catholic bishop (1863–1922)

His Eminence, The Right Reverend Henry Regis Granjon
- Bishop of Tucson
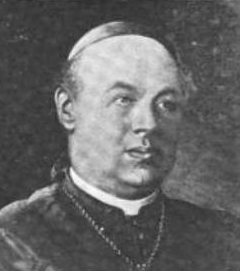
- Church: Roman Catholic Church
- See: Diocese of Tucson
- In office: June 17, 1900 to September 11, 1922
- Predecessor: Peter Bourgade
- Successor: Daniel James Gercke

Orders
- Ordination: December 17, 1887 by Joseph-Alfred Foulon
- Consecration: June 17, 1900 by James Gibbons

Personal details
- Born: June 15, 1863 Saint-Étienne, France
- Died: November 9, 1922 (aged 59) Brignais, France
- Education: Saint-Sulpice
- Motto: Audenter fide, caritate gaudenter (Boldly in faith, joyfully in charity)

Henry Regis Granjon (June 15, 1863 – November 9, 1922) was a French-born prelate of the Roman Catholic Church. He served as bishop of the Diocese of Tucson in Arizona from 1900 until his death in 1922.

== Biography ==
=== Early life ===
Henry Granjon was born on June 15, 1863, in Saint-Étienne, Loire, in France to Pierre Marie and Jeanne (née Meunier) Granjon. He received his seminary training at Saint-Sulpice in Paris, and in Rome, where he earned a Doctor of Divinity degree.

=== Priesthood ===
Granjon was ordained to the priesthood for the Archdiocese of Lyon in Lyon, France, on December 17, 1887, by Cardinal Joseph-Alfred Foulon. In 1890, Granjon traveled to the Arizona Territory in the United States to serve in the missions there. After arriving in Arizona, the Vicariate of Arizona assigned him to a mission church in Tombstone. Granjon in 1897 moved to Baltimore, Maryland to serve as the leader of the Society for the Propagation of the Faith in the United States.

=== Bishop of Tucson ===
On April 19, 1900, Granjon was appointed the second bishop of the new Diocese of Tucson by Pope Leo XIII. He received his episcopal consecration at the Basilica of the Assumption of the Blessed Virgin Mary in Baltimore on June 17, 1900, from Cardinal James Gibbons, with Bishops John J. Monaghan and Edward Patrick Allen serving as co-consecrators.

During his tenure, Granjon was deeply invested in the restoration of the historic Mission San Xavier del Bac on the San Xavier Indian Reservation in Arizona, generously supporting the renovation efforts with his own family resources.

In 1902, Bishop Granjon undertook a pastoral visit by train across the vast Tucson diocese, which at that time encompassed Southwest Arizona and New Mexico. His detailed account of this journey is preserved in “Along the Rio Grande: A Pastoral Visit to Southwest New Mexico in 1902, edited by Michael Romero Taylor of the Museum of New Mexico.

Granjon also contributed the articles "Tucson" and "Mission San Xavier del Bac" to the Catholic Encyclopedia. In 1904, Granjon stated that his diocese included "...40,000 Catholics, 90,000 heretics and 30,000 infidels".

=== Death ===
At age 59, Henry Granjon died on November 9, 1922, in Brignais, France while on a trip in Europe to meet with Pope Pius XI.

Catholic Church titles
Preceded by Peter Bourgade	Bishop of Tucson; 1900–1922	Succeeded by Daniel James Gercke
