= Saint Francis Seraph Church =

Church building in Ohio, United States

Coordinates: 39°06′48″N 84°30′59″W

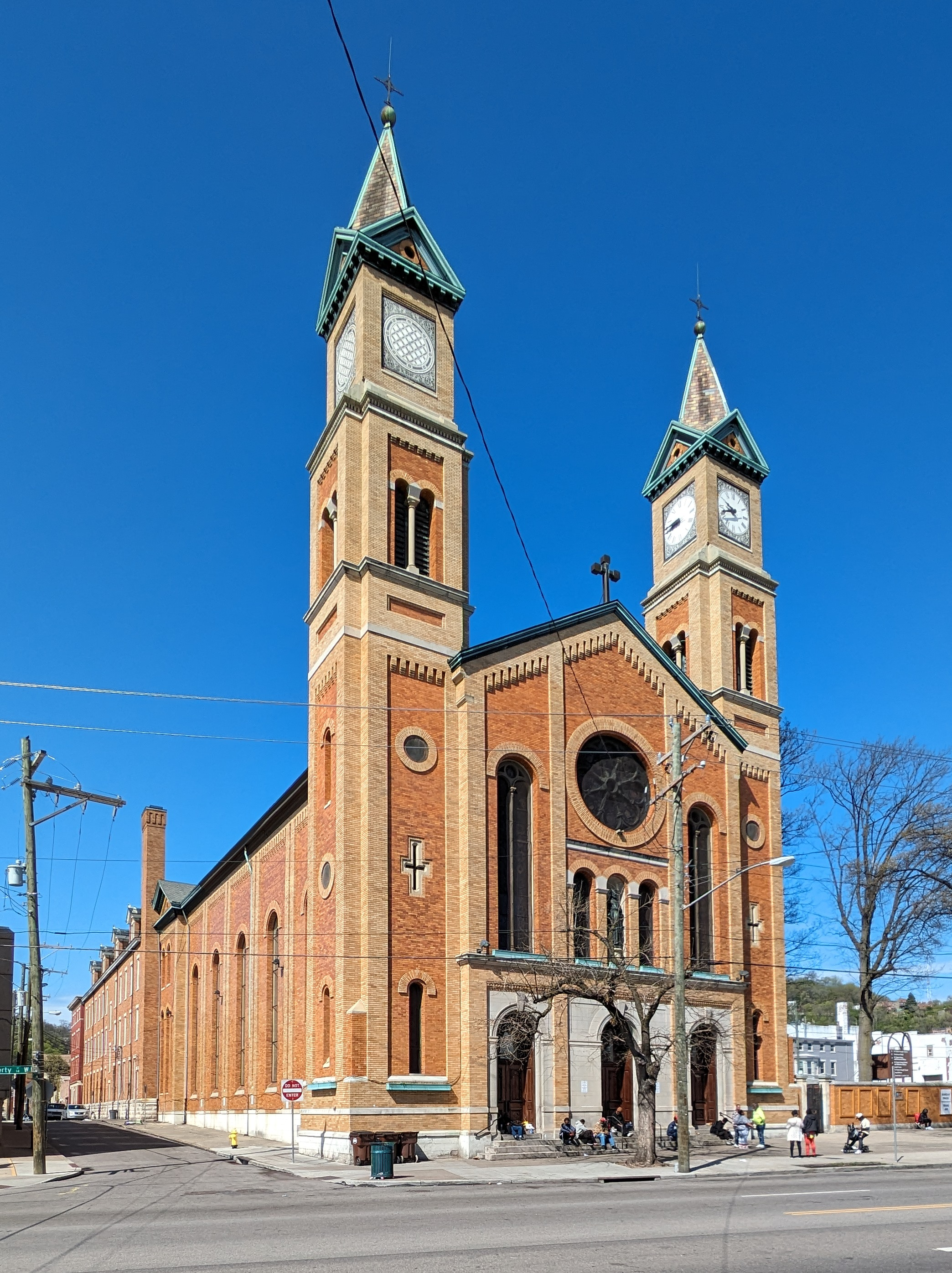
Saint Francis Seraph Church

St. Francis Seraph Church is a Roman Catholic parish in Cincinnati, Ohio, United States. It was established in 1859 by Franciscan Friars of the Province Of St. John the Baptist on the site of the first Catholic parish in Cincinnati, Christ Church, which was built in 1819. Bishop Fenwick, in 1822, decided to move Christ Church to a location on Sycamore Street where St. Francis Xavier now stands. The parish attempted to move the original frame church building, but it collapsed and fell apart.

The parish is within the Archdiocese of Cincinnati. The parish name refers to St Francis of Assisi, the founder of the Franciscan order, which in turn founded the parish. St. Francis had a vision of a six-winged angel, the seraph, for which the church is named. St. Francis Seraph Church closed after its final Mass on June 28, 2026.
