= Cathedral Basilica of St. Francis of Assisi =

Church in downtown Santa Fe, New Mexico, United States

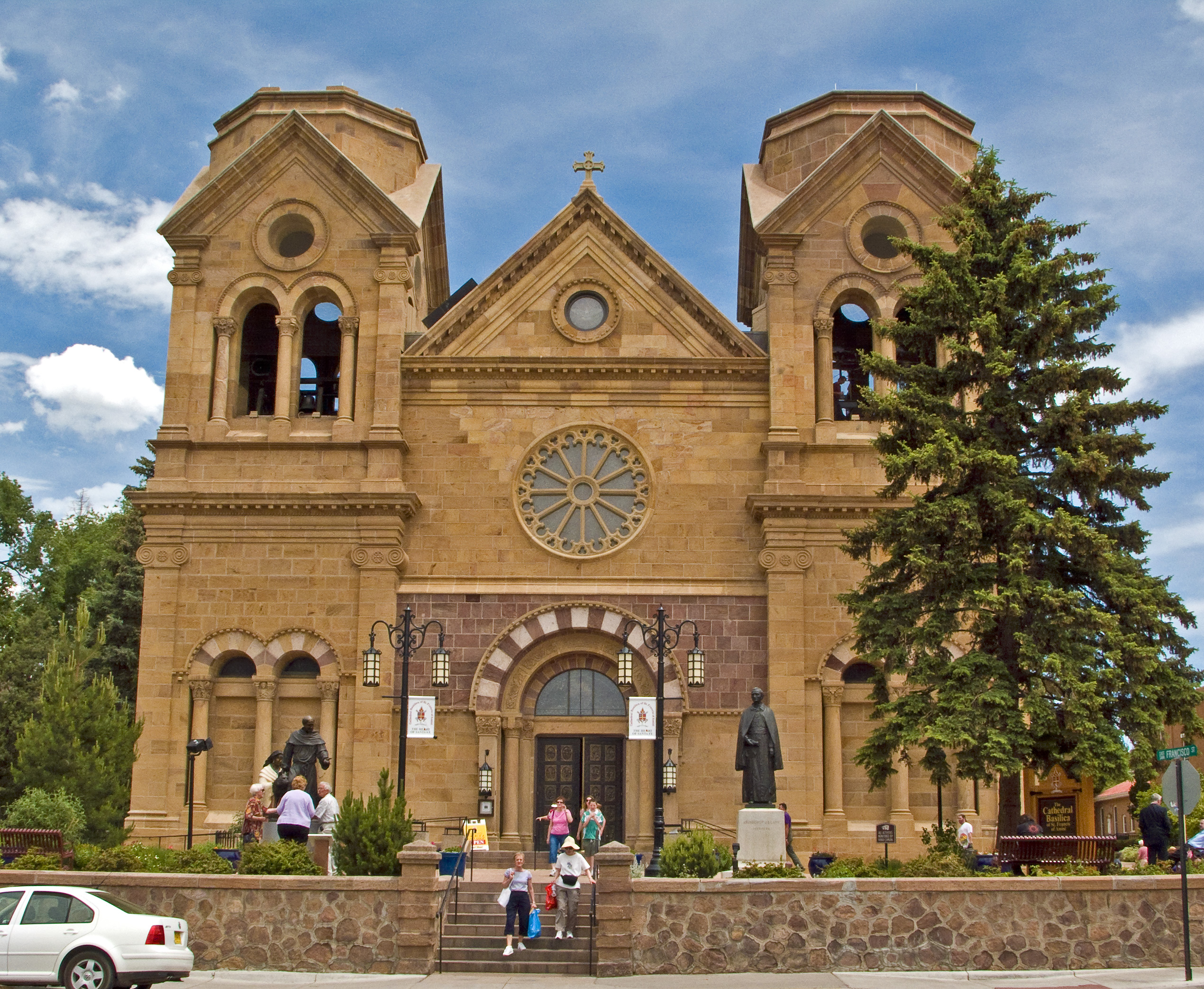
- Location: Santa Fe, New Mexico
- Country: United States
- Denomination: Catholic Church
- Sui iuris church: Latin Church
- Website: www.cbsfa.org

History
- Status: Cathedral/Parish
- Founded: 1714 (parish)
- Dedication: St. Francis of Assisi
- Dedicated: 1887

Architecture
- Functional status: Active
- Style: Romanesque Revival
- Years built: 1869–1887

Administration
- Archdiocese: Santa Fe

Clergy
- Archbishop: Most Rev. John Wester
- Rector: Very Rev. John D. Cannon
- St. Francis Cathedral
- U.S. Historic district – Contributing property
- Location within New Mexico Location within the United States
- Location: 131 Cathedral Place; Santa Fe, New Mexico
- Coordinates: 35°41′11.4″N 105°56′10.68″W
- Part of: Santa Fe Historic District (ID73001150)
- Added to NRHP: July 23, 1973

The Cathedral Basilica of Saint Francis of Assisi (Spanish: Catedral basílica de San Francisco de Asís), commonly known as Saint Francis Cathedral, is a Catholic cathedral in downtown Santa Fe, New Mexico. It is the mother church of the Archdiocese of Santa Fe.

== History ==
=== 1850 to 1900 ===
In 1853, Pope Pius IX erected the Diocese of Santa Fe and appointed Bishop Jean Baptiste Lamy, a French cleric, as its first bishop. At that time, Lamy was celebrating mass in La Parroquia (The Parish), an adobe church constructed in Santa Fe between 1714 and 1717 by Spanish missionaries. La Parroquia had replaced a church on the same site that was built in 1626 by missionaries. It was destroyed in 1680 by Pueblo tribesmen during the Pueblo Revolt that forced the Spanish out of Santa Fe.

Lamy began construction of the new cathedral in 1869, bringing in French architects and Italian stone masons. The workers constructed the new Cathedral around La Parroquia, which was demolished and carried out once the new construction was complete. Only a small chapel on the north side of the cathedral was kept from the old church. The Cathedral of Saint Francis of Assisi was dedicated in 1887.

=== 1900 to 2000 ===
In 1967, the archdiocese undertook a renovation of the cathedral. Contractors built the Blessed Sacrament Chapel and added sacristies to the nave. The structure was also shored up as needed.

During a second restoration in 1986, the archdiocese installed two new bronze doors.

=== 2000 to present ===
A 2005 addition to the upper façade of the cathedral is a small, round window featuring a dove, the symbol of the Holy Spirit. It is a stained glass replica of the translucent alabaster window designed in the 17th century by the Italian artist Bernini for St. Peter's Basilica in Vatican City.

The Cathedral of Saint Francis of Assisi was elevated to a minor basilica by Pope Benedict XVI on October 4, 2005.

During a 2007 Ash Wednesday mass, three CD players taped to the bottom of cathedral pews began blaring "foul language" and "pornographic messages". The devices were removed by staff and police were called to the scene. Two of the CD players were blown up by a bomb squad in a field near the church. The third was kept by police for further analysis once it was determined that they posed no harm. Churchgoers were not evacuated.

In 2022, the archdiocese announced that it was taking out a mortgage on the Cathedral Basilica of Saint Francis. It was to help pay a $75 million legal settlement to victims of sexual abuse by clergy in the archdiocese.

== Exterior ==
=== Design ===
Influenced by the French-born Archbishop Lamy and in dramatic contrast to the surrounding adobe structures, Saint Francis Cathedral was designed in the Romanesque Revival style. The cathedral was built from yellow limestone blocks quarried near present-day Lamy, New Mexico.

The cathedral features characteristic round arches separated by Corinthian columns. The large rose window in front and those of the Twelve Apostles in the lateral nave windows were imported from Clermont-Ferrand in France.

The cathedral contains two truncated square towers, with the north tower a single row of bricks taller than the south tower. The original cathedral plan called for a 160-foot (49 m) steeple on each tower, but lack of funds prevented their construction.

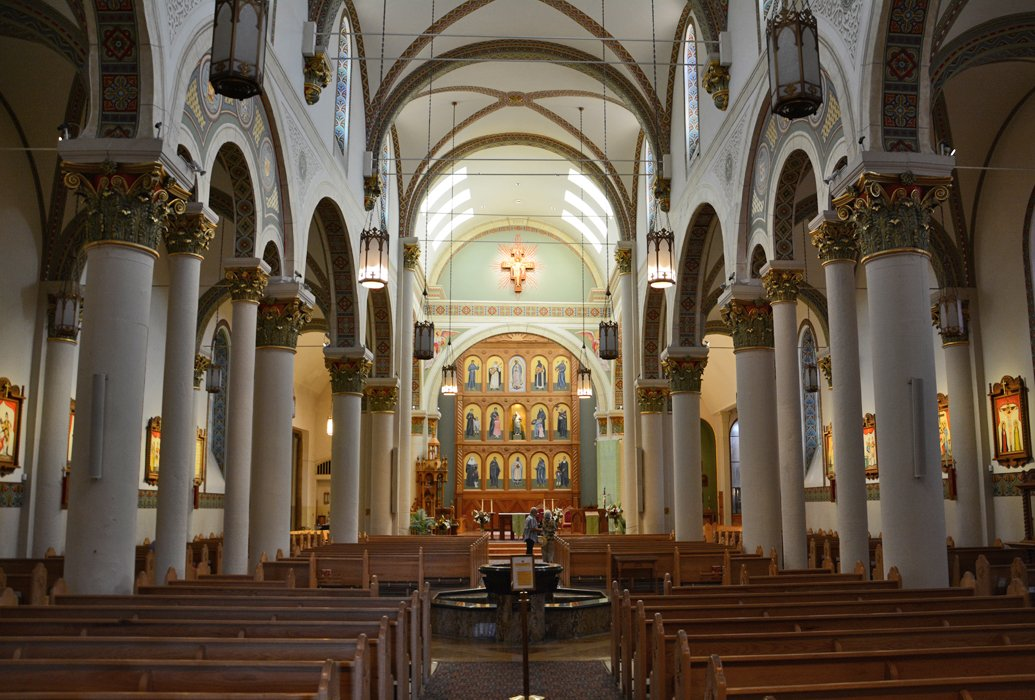
Nave and sanctuary, Cathedral Basilica of Saint Francis (2014)

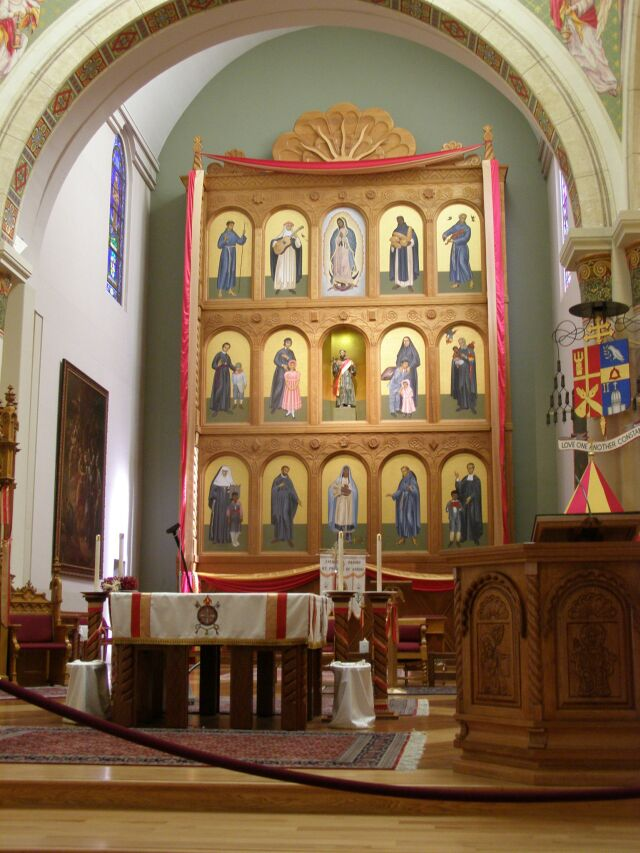
St. Francis of Assisi statue inside rederos, Cathedral Basilica of Saint Francis (2010)

=== Keystone ===
The keystone in the arch above the main entrance contains a triangle with a Hebrew tetragrammaton carved in it. An story from the 19th century was that Lamy placed the tetragrammaton on the cathedral to thank Jewish merchants in San Antonio who contributed to its building fund. However, the story was never verified. There are examples of other Catholic Churches using Hebrew symbols. A tetragrammaton inside a triangle symbolizing the trinity can be found in several Catholic churches in Europe.

=== Bronze doors ===
During the 1986 restoration of the cathedral, the archdiocese commissioned new front doors by the American artist Donna Quasthoff. Each door contains ten bronze panels that portray events in the history of the Catholic Church in Santa Fe.

== Interior ==
=== Nave ===
The baptismal font in the center of the nave was dedicated in 2001. Its location directly between the doors and the altar is representative of the faith journey taken by Catholics. Made of Brazilian granite, the eight-sided font represents the 8th day, or Easter. The basin is a cruciform, with three steps representing the three days between the crucifixion and resurrection of Jesus. The rill in the basin symbolizes the Four Evangelists, whom Jesus recruited to be fishers of men.

The nave also contains the ambry cabinet, containing the oils used in the sacraments, and the Easter Candle stand.

The nave walls display the stations of the cross. The original artwork was done in New Mexico Mission Style. During the 19th century, the French archbishops gradually removed the artwork and painted the walls white. In 1997, Archbishop Michael Jarboe Sheehan started a restoration of the cathedral interior to its original design. The stations were created in the Santero style by the American artist Marie Romero Cash. The Native American artist Roberto Montoya carved the Spanish-style frames.

=== Sanctuary ===
The sanctuary is located in the east end of the nave. Above the altar is the San Damiano Crucifix, a replica of the crucifix in Assisi, Italy. The altar screen, a reredos, was created for the 100th anniversary of the cathedral in 1986. An 18th-century statue of St. Francis is located in the center of the reredos. The statue is surrounded by painted images of saints of the New World. Directly behind the sanctuary is the entrance to the crypt.

The sanctuary was redesigned in 1986 in accordance with changes in the liturgical worship. The cathedra is located to the north, next to a pillar.

=== La Conquistadora Chapel ===
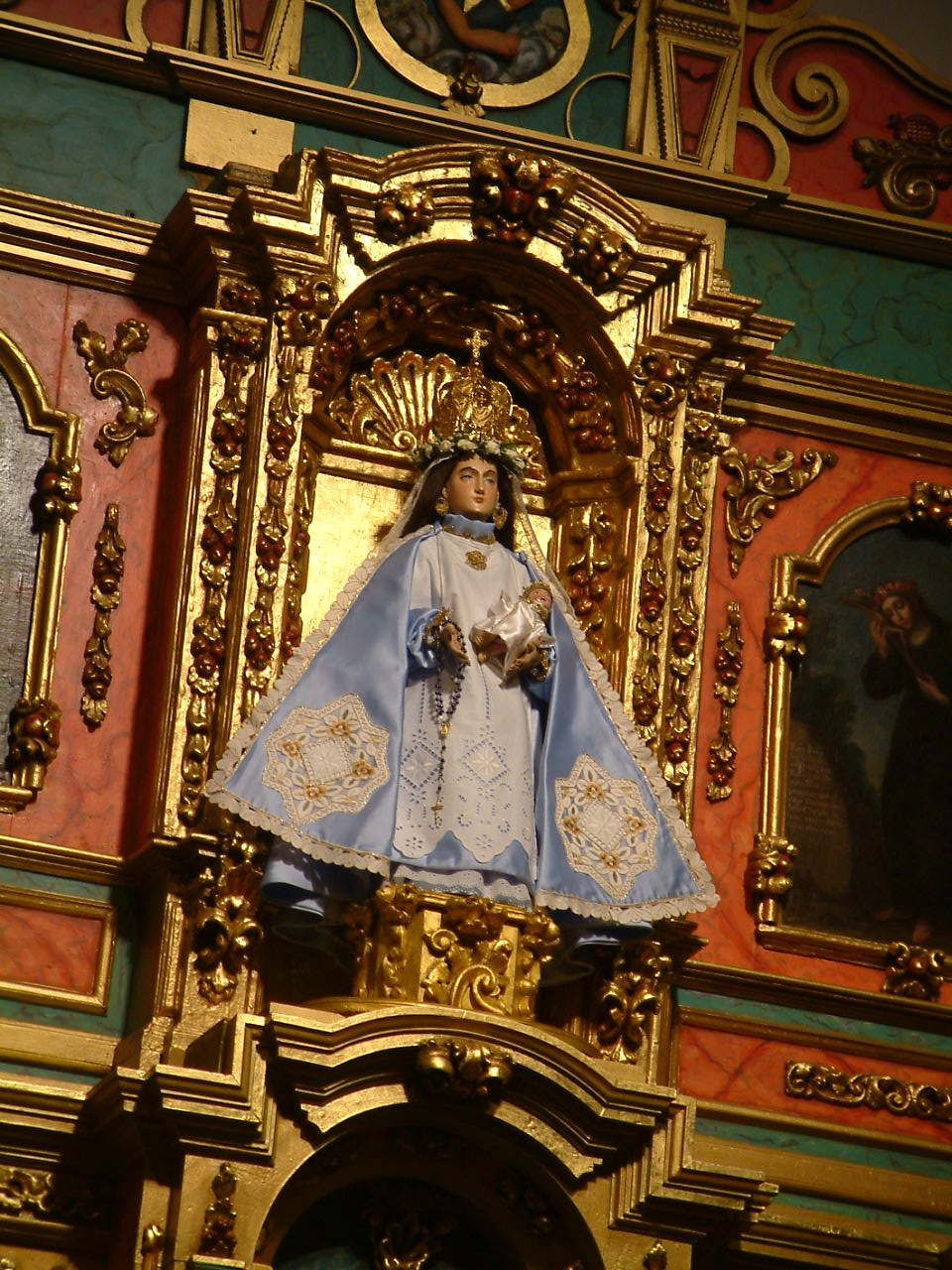
La Conquistadora statue, Cathedral Basilica of Saint Francis

The La Conquistadora Chapel occupies the north transept of the cathedral. It is the oldest part of the building, having been incorporated from the Parroquia Church that was built in 1717.

The chapel houses La Conquistadora, a wooden Madonna statue that was brought to New Mexico from Spain by the Portuguese missionary Alonso de Benavides in 1626. When the Spanish fled Santa Fe during the Pueblo Revolt in 1680, they took the statue with them. The Spanish ended the revolt and returned to Santa Fe in 1693 in what they called the Reconquista. They brought the Madonna stature back with them, where it received the name "La Conquistadora".

Behind the La Conquistadora is a carved and gilded wooden reredos with oil paintings depicting various saints. The reredos consists of two altar sections dating from the mid-1700s that were salvaged from the Parroquia Church. The sections were previously used as side altars in the main cathedral. The archdiocese restored the sections in 1957 and stacked them, one on top of the other, to form a reredos for the La Conquistadora Chapel.

The seven oil paintings in the rederos date from the 1700s. Four painting were attributed in 1976 to the Mexican painter Miguel Cabrera. During the restoration of the early 2000s, an older painting was discovered. To the left of the reredos are the coffins of two early Franciscan priests. The chapel is listed as a "contributing property" of the Santa Fe Historic District.

=== Blessed Sacrament Chapel ===
The Blessed Sacrament Chapel in the cathedral is reserved for prayer. The window wall along the south transept was added during the 1986 renovations. Etched into the glass are depictions of the apostles and the Holy Family, by the American liturgical artist Andrea Bacigalupa. The stained glass windows in the chapel were made in France and represent the eucharist.

== Statuary ==
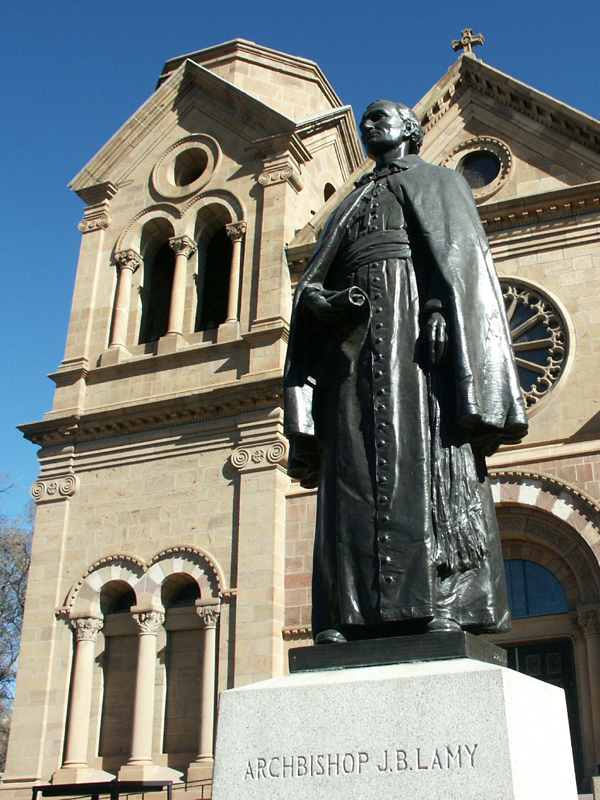
Archbishop J.B. Lamy Statue, Cathedral Basilica of Saint Francis (2006)

=== Saint Francis of Assisi ===
The statue of St. Francis of Assisi, the patron saint of the diocese, was obtained during the 1967 renovations. It is installed in the center of a rederos in the cathedral that displays the saints of the Americas.

=== Saint Kateri ===
The statue of Saint Kateri Tekakwitha was created by Estella Loretto, a Native American sculptor from the Jemez Pueblo in New Mexico. It was installed on the cathedral grounds in 2003. Tekakwitha was the first Native American saint A plaque noting Kateri's canonization was added in 2012.

=== Jean-Baptiste Lamy ===
The bronze statue of Archbishop J.B. Lamy by the Hungarian-American artist Jeno Juszko is located outside the cathedral main entrance. It was dedicated in 1915.

=== Stations of the Cross Prayer Garden ===
The prayer garden contains 14 life-size sculptures by the American sculptor Gib Singleton. Each statue represents a stage, or station of the cross, during the hours leading up to the crucifixion of Jesus. The prayer garden is sited in the remnant of Lamy's once-extensive gardens on the cathedral grounds.

== Cultural references ==
A fictionalized account of the cathedral's origins is included in Willa Cather's Death Comes for the Archbishop. Due to its prominent location off the plaza, many artists who have lived in or visited Santa Fe have captured its image in their work.

== Gallery of cathedral images ==
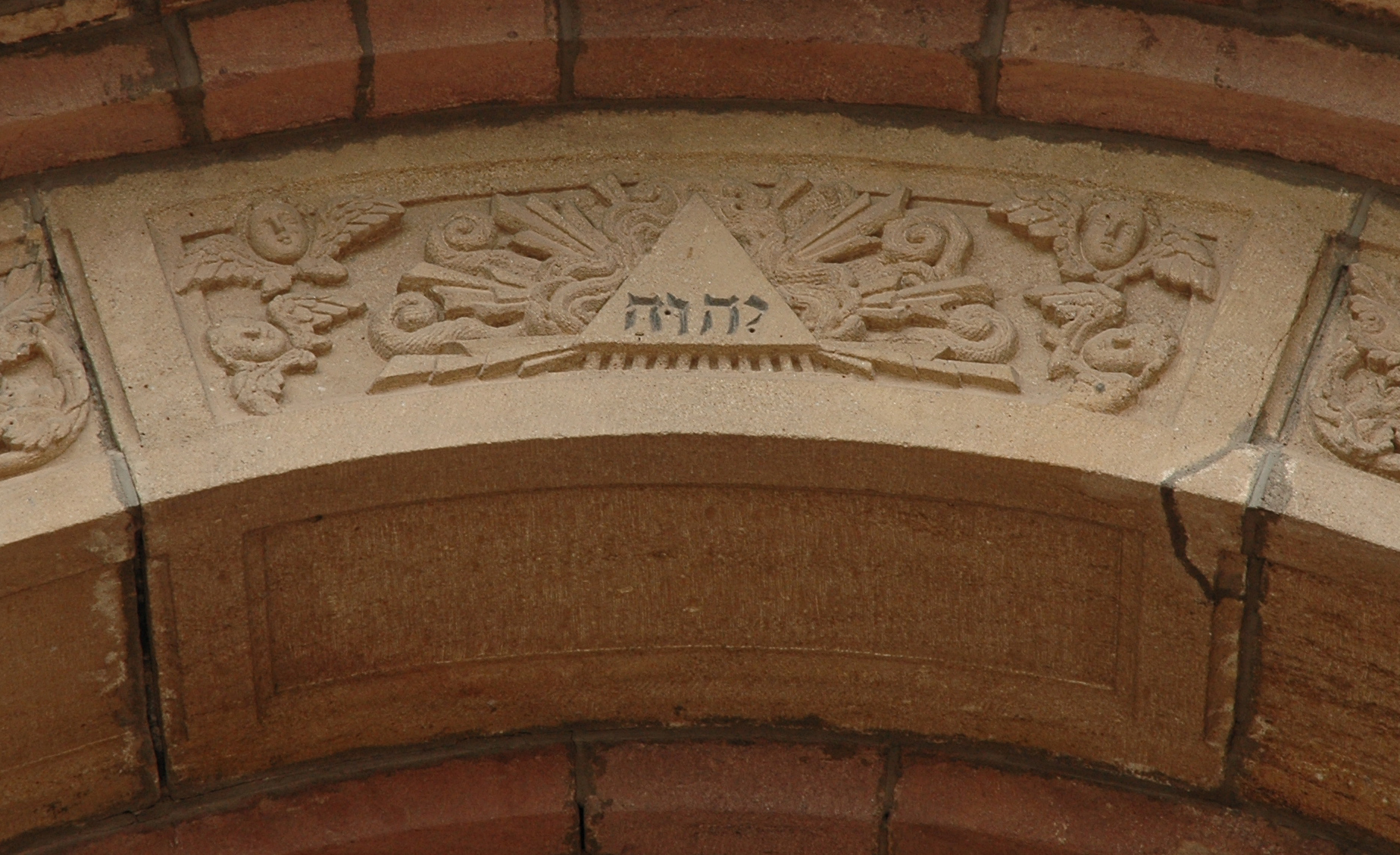
Tetragrammaton in keystone arch (2006)

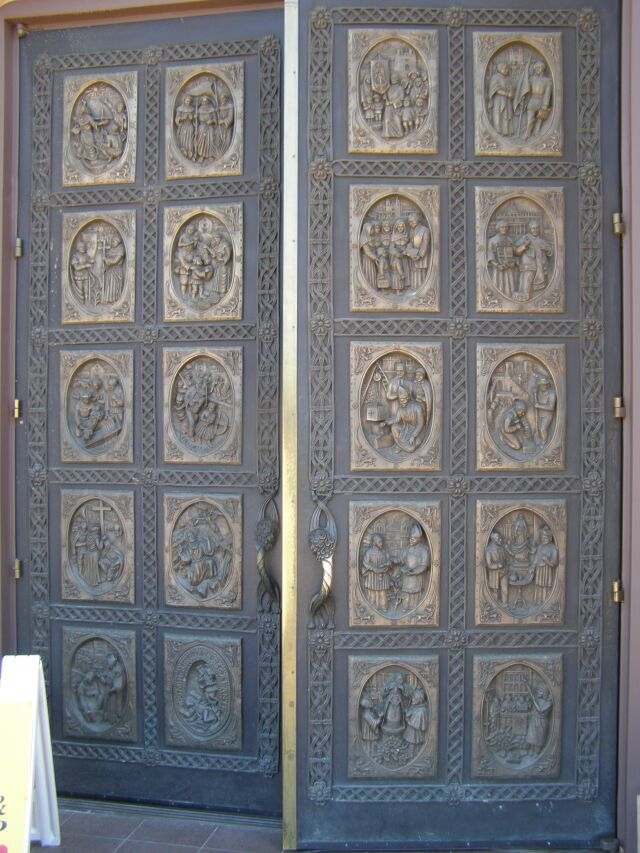
Front doors (2010)

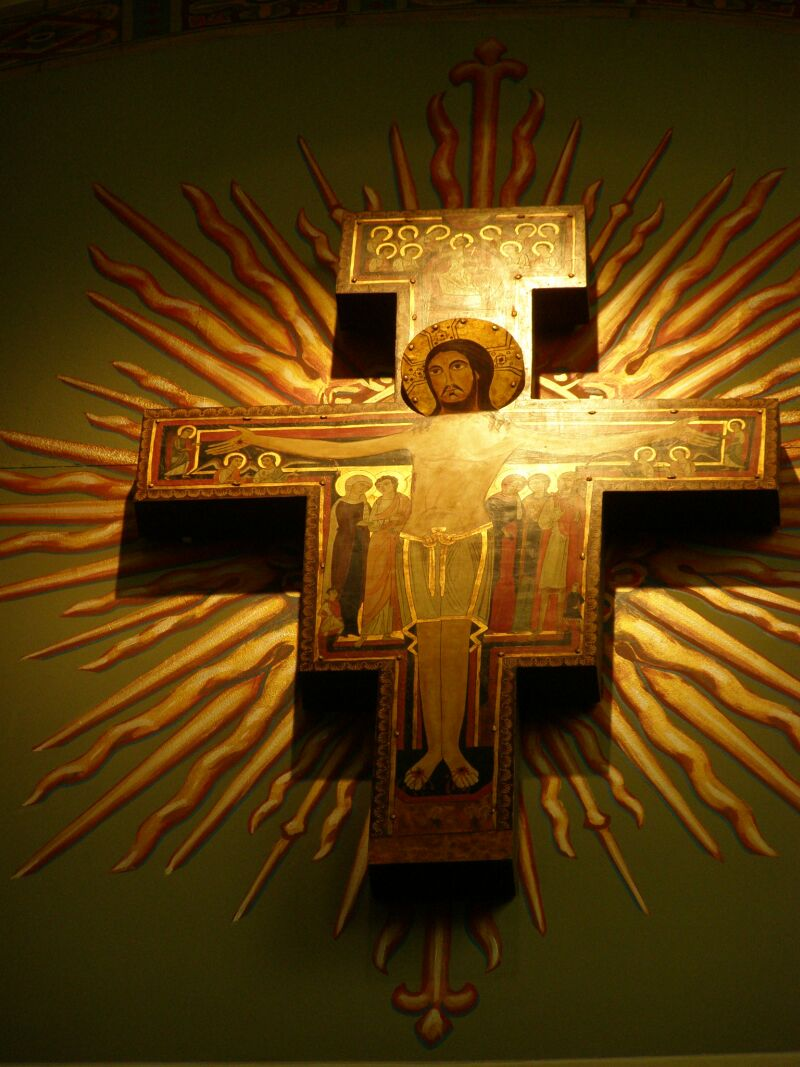
Replica of San Damiano Crucifix (2010)

== See also ==
- List of churches in the Roman Catholic Archdiocese of Santa Fe
- List of Catholic cathedrals in the United States
- List of cathedrals in the United States
