= St. Laurence Catholic Church (Amarillo, Texas) =

- Location in Texas St. Laurence Catholic Church (the United States)
- 35°14′08″N 101°47′24″W
- Location: 2300 N. Spring St. Amarillo, Texas
- Country: United States
- Denomination: Catholic Church
- Website: stlaurenceamarillotx.com

History
- Status: Parish church
- Founded: 1955
- Dedication: Saint Lawrence
- Dedicated: December 2, 1959

Architecture
- Architect: Paul Deeley (1975 renovation)
- Style: Modern
- Completed: 1959

Specifications
- Capacity: 500
- Materials: Brick

Administration
- Diocese: Amarillo

Clergy
- Bishop: Sede vacante

St. Laurence Catholic Church, formerly St. Laurence Cathedral, is a parish church in the Diocese of Amarillo located in Amarillo, Texas, United States. It served as the cathedral church of the Diocese of Amarillo from 1975 to 2011.

== History ==
On June 12, 1949, public Masses on Sundays and holy days began at St. Lucien’s Chapel at Price College in Northeast Amarillo. More than 40 people attended the first Mass. These Masses led to the establishment of St. Laurence Parish in 1955. St. Laurence School began before the parish, however. Ground was broken for a three-room school building on April 18, 1954. The school opened in September of that year with 71 students in two grades. The parish itself was started on May 16, 1955. The Rev. Leroy Matthiesen was named the first pastor. The parish gathered at St. Lucien’s until the church was built. After a capital campaign surpassed its $100,000 goal, ground was broken for a building meant to be a temporary church in early 1959. Bishop John L. Morkovsky dedicated the new church on December 2, 1959. The parish continued to grow throughout the 1960s, but it was affected by the closing of Amarillo Air Force Base in 1968. The parish lost 600 families, and enrollment at the school declined as costs rose. It was able to remain viable by the families and retired military personnel who remained.

By the early 1970s Sacred Heart Cathedral in downtown Amarillo declined to 25 families, and it was determined to close the parish. St. Laurence Church, which had seating for 500, was the largest in town. It was also located on diocesan property, including the Chancery Office, the bishop’s residence, Alamo Catholic High School, and St. Francis Convent. On November 10, 1974, Bishop Lawrence M. DeFalco executed the decree from the Holy See naming St. Laurence Church as the diocese’s new cathedral. It was decided not to build a new cathedral but to remodel the existing structure. Fort Worth architect Paul Deeley and Santa Fe, New Mexico liturgical artist Andrea Bacigalupa created a new worship space in the old church. The old pews were given to Our Lady of Guadalupe Church in Matador and St. Margaret Mary in Lamesa. The renovated church was consecrated as St. Laurence Cathedral on October 5, 1975. Paul Deeley won a first-place honor in 1977 at the Design Awards Program of the American Institute of Architects in Fort Worth for his work at St. Laurence. On March 25, 2011 St. Mary’s Church in Amarillo, which had dedicated a new church on September 11, 2010, was named by Pope Benedict XVI as the third cathedral for the Amarillo Diocese. St. Laurence reverted to the status of a parish church.

== See also ==
- List of Catholic cathedrals in the United States
- List of cathedrals in the United States
