= St. Mary's Cathedral (Amarillo, Texas) =

St. Mary’s Cathedral
- St. Mary’s Cathedral
- 35°12′11″N 101°50′58″W
- Location: 1200 S. Washington; Amarillo, Texas
- Country: United States
- Denomination: Roman Catholic Church
- Website: stmarysamarillo.com

History
- Status: Cathedral/Parish
- Founded: 1959
- Dedication: Blessed Virgin Mary
- Dedicated: September 11, 2010

Architecture
- Style: Modern
- Completed: 2010
- Construction cost: $10 million

Specifications
- Materials: Brick

Administration
- Diocese: Amarillo

Clergy
- Bishop: Sede vacante
- Rector: Fr. Anthony C. Neusch

St. Mary's Cathedral is a Catholic cathedral church located in Amarillo, Texas, in the United States. It has been the seat of the Diocese of Amarillo since 2011.

== History ==
=== St. Mary's Churches ===
During the 20th century and the early part of the 21st century, Sacred Heart Cathedral in Amarillo was the cathedral for the Diocese of Amarillo. The diocese purchased St. Mary’s Catholic Academy School in Amarillo in 1944 from the Sisters of Charity of the Incarnate Word in San Antonio. It then became the Sacred Heart Cathedral School.

In 1947, the diocese purchased a chapel from a US Air Force base in the region. It was disassembled and moved to the school campus to serve as a chapel of convenience for downtown Amarillo. Sacred Heart constructed a convent on the school grounds for the sisters teaching at St. Mary's Academy in 1950. In 1959, the chapel on the school campus was erected as St. Mary's Parish.

The diocese demolished Sacred Heart Cathedral in 1975. Its attendance was declining, its seating capacity was very limited and it needed extensive renovation. To replace it, the diocese dedicated St. Laurence Church in Amarillo as St. Laurence Cathedral. In 1981, the St. Mary's parishioners constructed a new St. Mary's Church.

On February 26, 2007, a fire destroyed the second St. Mary's Church. Investigators reported that they could not find the cause of the fire. At this point, Bishop John Yanta suggested that the third St. Mary's Church should actually replace St. Laurence as the cathedral. After consulting with his priests, Bishop Patrick Zurek petitioned the Vatican to make the change.

=== St. Mary's Cathedral ===
The third St. Mary's Church was dedicated on September 11, 2010. It was proclaimed as the third cathedral of the diocese on March 25, 2011.

In January 2019, a man was arrested after bringing six guns to the St. Mary's Cathedral School. Police found two assault rifles with ammunition in his vehicle. No shots were fired: the individual claimed he only wanted to help the church improve its security. Tony Neusch, rector of St. Mary's Cathedral, was pepper-sprayed at the cathedral in 2024 while he was hearing confessions. The man was later arrested; Neusch said that the individual had been dealing with some mental issues. Neusch was not injured.

== Cathedral interior ==
=== Sanctuary ===
The main altar in St. Mary's Cathedral contains the three altar stones from Sacred Heart Cathedral. The sanctuary windows were designed by Conrad Schmitt Studios of New Berlin, Wisconsin, based on the designs from Sacred Heart. The reliquary inside the altar contains relics of the following saints:

- Thomas Aquinas – Italian theologian and priest of the 13th century
- St. John Vianney – French priest of the 19th century
- Pope Pius X – Austrian prelate of the early 20th century

==== St. Mary's Adoration and Daily Use Chapel ====
The Adoration Chapel in the cathedral contains two carved wood angels from the side altars of Sacred Heart. The Garden of Gethsemane stained glass window in the chapel was previously installed over the door of the former cathedral. The altar in the chapel was also salvaged from Sacred Heart.

=== Baptismal font ===
The baptismal font was crafted in copper by an artist in South Texas. It holds 150 gallons of water that is constantly circulating.

=== Pipe organ ===
The pipe organ has 1,200 pipes and trumpets, valued at $900,000.

=== Cathedral exterior ===
The exterior of the cathedral displays a bas relief in the brick of Virgin Mary with the Christ Child. It was created by a Nebraska artist.

== See also ==
- List of Catholic cathedrals in the United States
- List of cathedrals in the United States
