= Katherine E. Price =

American philanthropist

- Countess of the Holy Roman Church
- Spouse: Lucian B. Price
- Occupation: philanthropist

Katherine E. Price was an American philanthropist and patroness of various Catholic institutions. In 1936, Pope Pius XI granted her the rank of papal countess.

== Biography ==
Price was the wife of Lucian B. Price. After her husband's death, she became an active philanthropist, funding the construction of Catholic churches, schools, and other institutions in the United States. She was a distant cousin of Bishop Eugene J. McGuinness. A patroness of the Roman Catholic Diocese of Amarillo, Price donated funds to St. George's College to prevent the school from closing. It was renamed the Price Memorial College in honor of her late husband. Price traveled from her home in Greenwich, Connecticut, to Texas for the dedication ceremony. Price was also responsible for funding the construction of St. Elizabeth's Catholic Church in Lubbock, Texas, St. Catherine of Siena Catholic Church in Pauls Valley, Oklahoma, and St. Catherine of Siena Catholic Church in Wake Forest, North Carolina. The latter two churches were named after Price's patron saint, Catherine of Siena.

In April 1936, Price was elevated into the Nobility of the Holy See and made a papal countess by Pope Pius XI.
