= Yanta =

Yanta may refer to:

- Yanta District, in Xi'an, Shaanxi, China
- John Yanta (1931-2022), Roman Catholic bishop in the United States
- Yanta (village), a village in Southern Lebanon
