= List of Catholic cathedrals in the United States =

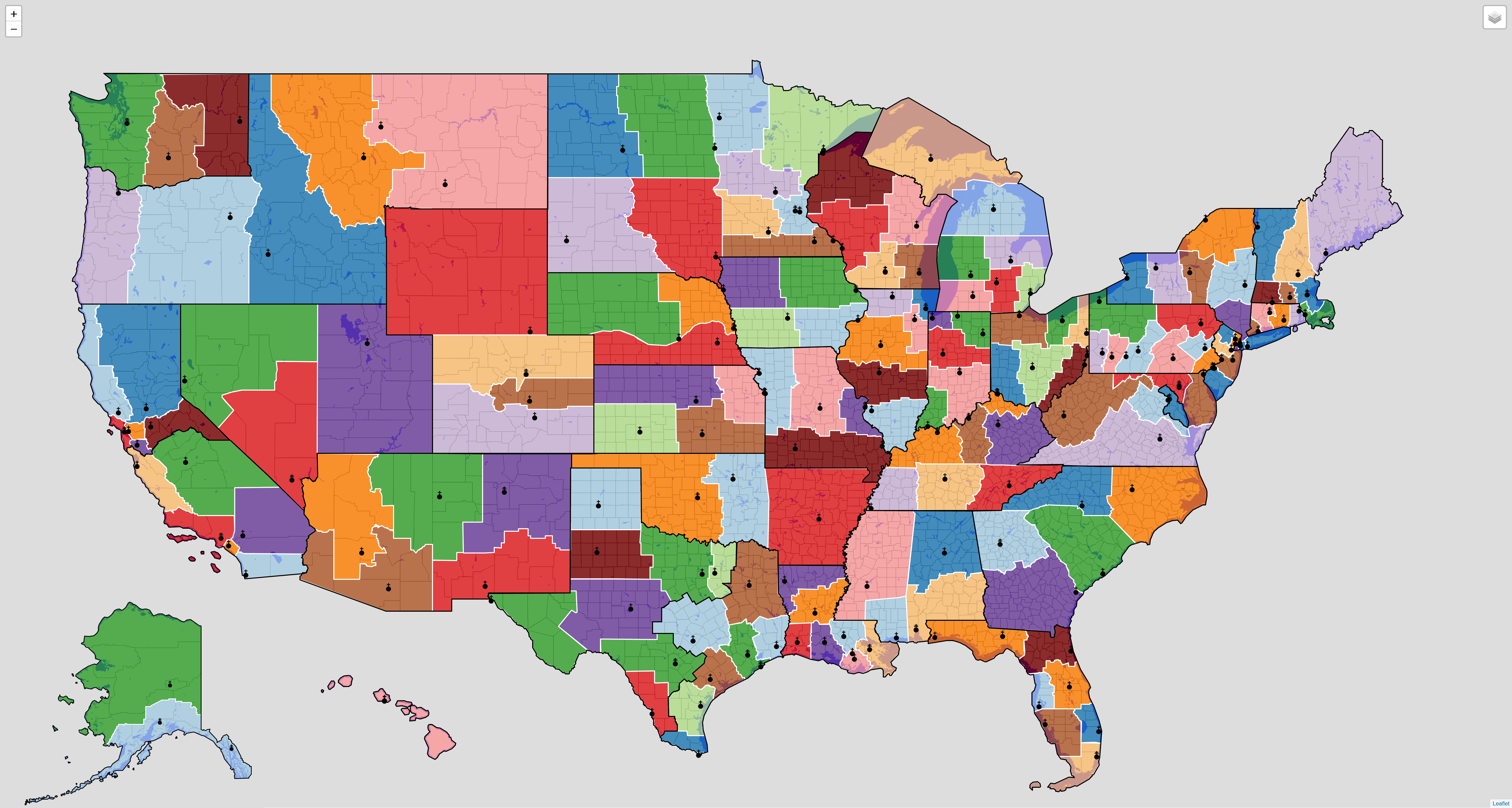
Locations of Latin Church cathedrals (or churches serving as a cathedral) in the United States. Diocesan cathedrals are marked with a one-bar globus cruciger, and archdiocesan cathedrals are marked with a two-bar globus cruciger.

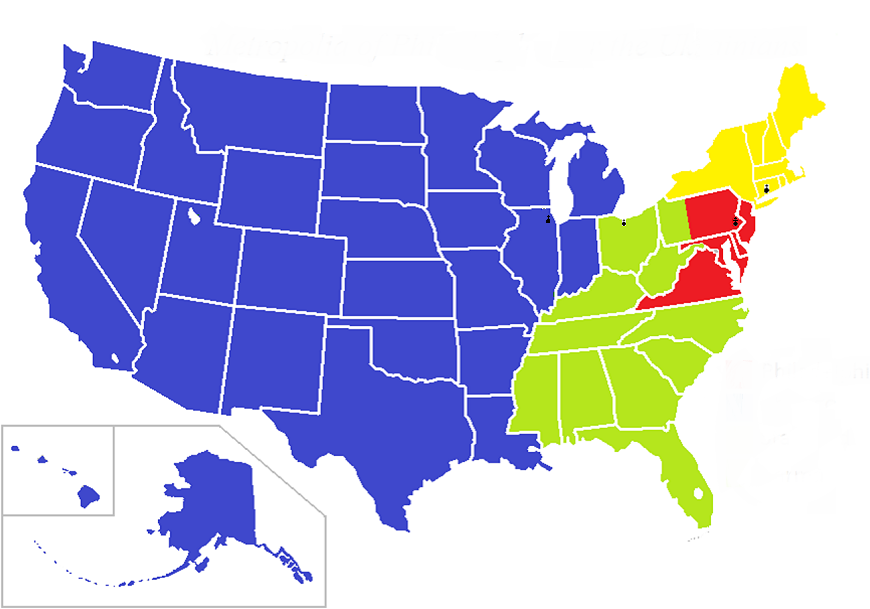
Locations of the Ukrainian Catholic Archeparchy and Eparchies Cathedrals.

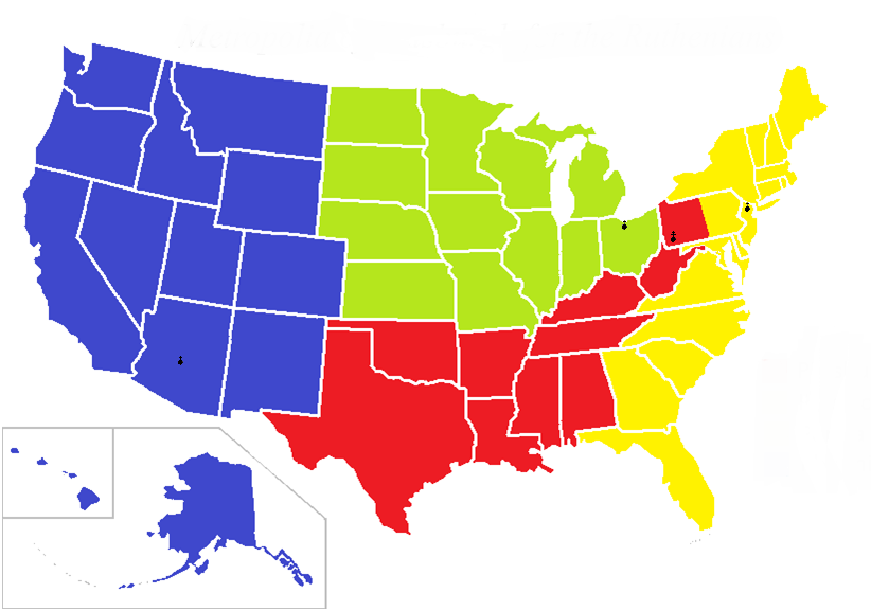
Locations of the Ruthenian Catholic Archeparchy and Eparchies Cathedrals.

The Catholic Church in the United States comprises ecclesiastical territories called dioceses, eparchies, and ordinariates led by prelate ordinaries known as bishops. Each bishop is assigned to a cathedral from which he is pastor to the people of his jurisdiction. Some dioceses also have a co-cathedral or a pro-cathedral. This is a complete list of the 193 cathedrals of the Latin Church and the 20 cathedrals of the Eastern Catholic Churches in the United States.

== Latin Church ==
Ecclesiastical Province Map	Image	Cathedral	Diocese	City, State
=== Ecclesiastical Province of Anchorage–Juneau ===
		Our Lady of Guadalupe Cathedral	Archdiocese of Anchorage-Juneau	Anchorage, Alaska
		Co-Cathedral of the Nativity of the Blessed Virgin Mary	Archdiocese of Anchorage-Juneau	Juneau, Alaska
		Sacred Heart Cathedral	Diocese of Fairbanks	Fairbanks, Alaska
=== Ecclesiastical Province of Atlanta ===
		Cathedral of Christ the King	Archdiocese of Atlanta	Atlanta, Georgia
		Cathedral of Saint John the Baptist	Diocese of Charleston	Charleston, South Carolina
		Cathedral of Saint Patrick	Diocese of Charlotte	Charlotte, North Carolina
		Holy Name of Jesus Cathedral	Diocese of Raleigh	Raleigh, North Carolina
		Cathedral Basilica of Saint John the Baptist	Diocese of Savannah	Savannah, Georgia
=== Ecclesiastical Province of Baltimore ===
		Cathedral of Mary Our Queen	Archdiocese of Baltimore	Baltimore, Maryland
		Basilica of the National Shrine of the Assumption of the Blessed Virgin Mary	Archdiocese of Baltimore	Baltimore, Maryland
		Cathedral of Saint Thomas More	Diocese of Arlington	Arlington, Virginia
		Cathedral of the Sacred Heart	Diocese of Richmond	Richmond, Virginia
		Cathedral of Saint Joseph	Diocese of Wheeling-Charleston	Wheeling, West Virginia
		Basilica of the Co-Cathedral of the Sacred Heart	Diocese of Wheeling-Charleston	Charleston, West Virginia
		Cathedral of Saint Peter	Diocese of Wilmington	Wilmington, Delaware
=== Ecclesiastical Province of Boston ===
		Cathedral of the Holy Cross	Archdiocese of Boston	Boston, Massachusetts
		Cathedral of Saint Joseph	Diocese of Burlington	Burlington, Vermont
		Cathedral of St. Mary of the Assumption	Diocese of Fall River	Fall River, Massachusetts
		Cathedral of Saint Joseph	Diocese of Manchester	Manchester, New Hampshire
		Cathedral of the Immaculate Conception	Diocese of Portland	Portland, Maine
		Saint Michael's Cathedral	Diocese of Springfield in Massachusetts	Springfield, Massachusetts
		Cathedral of Saint Paul	Diocese of Worcester	Worcester, Massachusetts
=== Ecclesiastical Province of Chicago ===
		Holy Name Cathedral	Archdiocese of Chicago	Chicago, Illinois
		St. Peter's Cathedral	Diocese of Belleville	Belleville, Illinois
		Cathedral of St. Raymond Nonnatus	Diocese of Joliet	Joliet, Illinois
		Cathedral of Saint Mary of the Immaculate Conception	Diocese of Peoria	Peoria, Illinois
		Cathedral of Saint Peter	Diocese of Rockford	Rockford, Illinois
		Cathedral of the Immaculate Conception	Diocese of Springfield in Illinois	Springfield, Illinois
=== Ecclesiastical Province of Cincinnati ===
		Cathedral Basilica of Saint Peter in Chains	Archdiocese of Cincinnati	Cincinnati, Ohio
		Cathedral of Saint John the Evangelist	Diocese of Cleveland	Cleveland, Ohio
		Saint Joseph Cathedral	Diocese of Columbus	Columbus, Ohio
		Holy Name Cathedral	Diocese of Steubenville	Steubenville, Ohio
		Our Lady, Queen of the Most Holy Rosary Cathedral	Diocese of Toledo	Toledo, Ohio
		St. Columba Cathedral	Diocese of Youngstown	Youngstown, Ohio
=== Ecclesiastical Province of Denver ===
		Cathedral Basilica of the Immaculate Conception	Archdiocese of Denver	Denver, Colorado
		St. Mary's Cathedral	Diocese of Cheyenne	Cheyenne, Wyoming
		Cathedral of Saint Mary	Diocese of Colorado Springs	Colorado Springs, Colorado
		Cathedral of the Sacred Heart	Diocese of Pueblo	Pueblo, Colorado
=== Ecclesiastical Province of Detroit ===
		Cathedral of the Most Blessed Sacrament	Archdiocese of Detroit	Detroit, Michigan
		St. Mary, Our Lady of Mount Carmel Cathedral	Diocese of Gaylord	Gaylord, Michigan
		Cathedral of Saint Andrew	Diocese of Grand Rapids	Grand Rapids, Michigan
		Cathedral of Saint Augustine	Diocese of Kalamazoo	Kalamazoo, Michigan
		Saint Mary Cathedral	Diocese of Lansing	Lansing, Michigan
		Saint Peter Cathedral	Diocese of Marquette	Marquette, Michigan
		Cathedral of Mary of the Assumption	Diocese of Saginaw	Saginaw, Michigan
=== Ecclesiastical Province of Dubuque ===
		Saint Raphael's Cathedral	Archdiocese of Dubuque	Dubuque, Iowa
		Sacred Heart Cathedral	Diocese of Davenport	Davenport, Iowa
		Saint Ambrose Cathedral	Diocese of Des Moines	Des Moines, Iowa
		Cathedral of the Epiphany	Diocese of Sioux City	Sioux City, Iowa
=== Ecclesiastical Province of Galveston–Houston ===
		Saint Mary Cathedral Basilica	Archdiocese of Galveston–Houston	Galveston, Texas
		Co-Cathedral of the Sacred Heart	Archdiocese of Galveston–Houston	Houston, Texas
		Saint Mary Cathedral	Diocese of Austin	Austin, Texas
		Saint Anthony Cathedral Basilica	Diocese of Beaumont	Beaumont, Texas
		Immaculate Conception Cathedral	Diocese of Brownsville	Brownsville, Texas
		Corpus Christi Cathedral	Diocese of Corpus Christi	Corpus Christi, Texas
		Cathedral of the Immaculate Conception	Diocese of Tyler	Tyler, Texas
		Our Lady of Victory Cathedral	Diocese of Victoria	Victoria, Texas
=== Ecclesiastical Province of Hartford ===
		Cathedral of Saint Joseph	Archdiocese of Hartford	Hartford, Connecticut
		Saint Augustine Cathedral	Diocese of Bridgeport	Bridgeport, Connecticut
		Cathedral of Saint Patrick	Diocese of Norwich	Norwich, Connecticut
		Cathedral of Saints Peter and Paul	Diocese of Providence	Providence, Rhode Island
=== Ecclesiastical Province of Indianapolis ===
		Saints Peter and Paul Cathedral	Archdiocese of Indianapolis	Indianapolis, Indiana
		Cathedral of Saint Benedict	Diocese of Evansville	Evansville, Indiana
		Cathedral of the Immaculate Conception	Diocese of Fort Wayne–South Bend	Fort Wayne, Indiana
		St. Matthew Cathedral	Diocese of Fort Wayne–South Bend	South Bend, Indiana
		Cathedral of the Holy Angels	Diocese of Gary	Gary, Indiana
		Cathedral of Saint Mary of the Immaculate Conception	Diocese of Lafayette in Indiana	Lafayette, Indiana
=== Ecclesiastical Province of Kansas City ===
		Cathedral of Saint Peter	Archdiocese of Kansas City in Kansas	Kansas City, Kansas
		Cathedral of Our Lady of Guadalupe	Diocese of Dodge City	Dodge City, Kansas
		Sacred Heart Cathedral	Diocese of Salina	Salina, Kansas
		Cathedral of the Immaculate Conception	Diocese of Wichita	Wichita, Kansas
=== Ecclesiastical Province of Las Vegas ===
		Guardian Angel Cathedral	Archdiocese of Las Vegas	Las Vegas, Nevada
		Saint Thomas Aquinas Cathedral	Diocese of Reno	Reno, Nevada
		Cathedral of the Madeleine	Diocese of Salt Lake City	Salt Lake City, Utah
=== Ecclesiastical Province of Los Angeles ===
		Cathedral of Our Lady of the Angels	Archdiocese of Los Angeles	Los Angeles, California
		Saint John the Baptist Cathedral	Diocese of Fresno	Fresno, California
		Cathedral of San Carlos Borromeo	Diocese of Monterey	Monterey, California
		Christ Cathedral	Diocese of Orange	Garden Grove, California
		Our Lady of the Rosary Cathedral	Diocese of San Bernardino	San Bernardino, California
		Saint Joseph Cathedral	Diocese of San Diego	San Diego, California
=== Ecclesiastical Province of Louisville ===
		Cathedral of the Assumption	Archdiocese of Louisville	Louisville, Kentucky
		Cathedral Basilica of the Assumption	Diocese of Covington	Covington, Kentucky
		Cathedral of the Most Sacred Heart of Jesus	Diocese of Knoxville	Knoxville, Tennessee
		Cathedral of Christ the King	Diocese of Lexington	Lexington, Kentucky
		Cathedral of the Immaculate Conception	Diocese of Memphis	Memphis, Tennessee
		Cathedral of the Incarnation	Diocese of Nashville	Nashville, Tennessee
		Saint Stephen Cathedral	Diocese of Owensboro	Owensboro, Kentucky
=== Ecclesiastical Province of Miami ===
		Cathedral of Saint Mary	Archdiocese of Miami	Miami, Florida
		Saint James Cathedral	Diocese of Orlando	Orlando, Florida
		Cathedral of Saint Ignatius Loyola	Diocese of Palm Beach	Palm Beach, Florida
		Cathedral of the Sacred Heart	Diocese of Pensacola–Tallahassee	Pensacola, Florida
		Co-Cathedral of Saint Thomas More	Diocese of Pensacola–Tallahassee	Tallahassee, Florida
		Cathedral Basilica of St. Augustine	Diocese of St. Augustine	St. Augustine, Florida
		Cathedral of Saint Jude the Apostle	Diocese of St. Petersburg	St. Petersburg, Florida
		Epiphany Cathedral	Diocese of Venice	Venice, Florida
=== Ecclesiastical Province of Milwaukee ===
		Cathedral of Saint John the Evangelist	Archdiocese of Milwaukee	Milwaukee, Wisconsin
		Cathedral of Saint Francis Xavier	Diocese of Green Bay	Green Bay, Wisconsin
		Cathedral of Saint Joseph the Workman	Diocese of La Crosse	La Crosse, Wisconsin
		St. Bernard Church was named the diocesan cathedral in 2023 by Pope Francis. Once the renovation of the church building is completed in 2026, St. Bernard's will be consecrated as the cathedral.	Diocese of Madison	Madison, Wisconsin
		Cathedral of Christ the King	Diocese of Superior	Superior, Wisconsin
=== Ecclesiastical Province of Mobile ===
		Cathedral Basilica of the Immaculate Conception	Archdiocese of Mobile	Mobile, Alabama
		Cathedral of the Nativity of the Blessed Virgin Mary	Diocese of Biloxi	Biloxi, Mississippi
		Cathedral of Saint Paul	Diocese of Birmingham	Birmingham, Alabama
		Cathedral of Saint Peter the Apostle	Diocese of Jackson	Jackson, Mississippi
=== Ecclesiastical Province of New Orleans ===
		Cathedral-Basilica of Saint Louis IX King of France	Archdiocese of New Orleans	New Orleans, Louisiana
		Saint Francis Xavier Cathedral	Diocese of Alexandria	Alexandria, Louisiana
		Saint Joseph Cathedral	Diocese of Baton Rouge	Baton Rouge, Louisiana
		Cathedral of Saint Francis de Sales	Diocese of Houma–Thibodaux	Houma, Louisiana
		Saint Joseph Co-Cathedral	Diocese of Houma–Thibodaux	Thibodaux, Louisiana
		Cathedral of Saint John the Evangelist	Diocese of Lafayette in Louisiana	Lafayette, Louisiana
		Cathedral of the Immaculate Conception	Diocese of Lake Charles	Lake Charles, Louisiana
		Cathedral of St. John Berchmans	Diocese of Shreveport	Shreveport, Louisiana
=== Ecclesiastical Province of New York ===
		Saint Patrick's Cathedral	Archdiocese of New York	New York, New York
		Cathedral of the Immaculate Conception	Diocese of Albany	Albany, New York
		Cathedral Basilica of Saint James	Diocese of Brooklyn	Brooklyn, New York
		Co-Cathedral of Saint Joseph	Diocese of Brooklyn	Brooklyn, New York
		Saint Joseph Cathedral	Diocese of Buffalo	Buffalo, New York
		Saint Mary's Cathedral	Diocese of Ogdensburg	Ogdensburg, New York
		Sacred Heart Cathedral	Diocese of Rochester	Rochester, New York
		St. Agnes Cathedral	Diocese of Rockville Centre	Rockville Centre, New York
		Cathedral of the Immaculate Conception	Diocese of Syracuse	Syracuse, New York
=== Ecclesiastical Province of Newark ===
		Cathedral Basilica of the Sacred Heart	Archdiocese of Newark	Newark, New Jersey
		Cathedral of the Immaculate Conception	Diocese of Camden	Camden, New Jersey
		Saint Francis of Assisi Cathedral	Diocese of Metuchen	Metuchen, New Jersey
		Cathedral of Saint John the Baptist	Diocese of Paterson	Paterson, New Jersey
		Cathedral of Saint Mary of the Assumption	Diocese of Trenton	Trenton, New Jersey
		Co-Cathedral of St. Robert Bellarmine	Diocese of Trenton	Freehold Township, New Jersey
=== Ecclesiastical Province of Oklahoma City ===
		Cathedral of Our Lady of Perpetual Help	Archdiocese of Oklahoma City	Oklahoma City, Oklahoma
		Cathedral of Saint Andrew	Diocese of Little Rock	Little Rock, Arkansas
		Holy Family Cathedral	Diocese of Tulsa	Tulsa, Oklahoma
=== Ecclesiastical Province of Omaha ===
		St. Cecilia Cathedral	Archdiocese of Omaha	Omaha, Nebraska
		Cathedral of the Nativity of the Blessed Virgin Mary	Diocese of Grand Island	Grand Island, Nebraska
		Cathedral of the Risen Christ	Diocese of Lincoln	Lincoln, Nebraska
=== Ecclesiastical Province of Philadelphia ===
		Cathedral Basilica of Saints Peter and Paul	Archdiocese of Philadelphia	Philadelphia, Pennsylvania
		Cathedral of Saint Catharine of Siena	Diocese of Allentown	Allentown, Pennsylvania
		Cathedral of the Blessed Sacrament	Diocese of Altoona–Johnstown	Altoona, Pennsylvania
		St. John Gualbert Cathedral	Diocese of Altoona–Johnstown	Johnstown, Pennsylvania
		Saint Peter Cathedral	Diocese of Erie	Erie, Pennsylvania
		Blessed Sacrament Cathedral	Diocese of Greensburg	Greensburg, Pennsylvania
		Cathedral of Saint Patrick	Diocese of Harrisburg	Harrisburg, Pennsylvania
		Saint Paul Cathedral	Diocese of Pittsburgh	Pittsburgh, Pennsylvania
		Saint Peter's Cathedral	Diocese of Scranton	Scranton, Pennsylvania
=== Ecclesiastical Province of Portland ===
		Saint Mary's Cathedral of the Immaculate Conception	Archdiocese of Portland	Portland, Oregon
		Saint Francis de Sales Cathedral	Diocese of Baker	Baker City, Oregon
		Cathedral of Saint John the Evangelist	Diocese of Boise	Boise, Idaho
		Saint Ann's Cathedral	Diocese of Great Falls–Billings	Great Falls, Montana
		Saint Patrick's Co-Cathedral	Diocese of Great Falls–Billings	Billings, Montana
		Cathedral of Saint Helena	Diocese of Helena	Helena, Montana
=== Ecclesiastical Province of St. Louis ===
		Cathedral Basilica of Saint Louis	Archdiocese of St. Louis	St. Louis, Missouri
		Cathedral of Saint Joseph	Diocese of Jefferson City	Jefferson City, Missouri
		Cathedral of the Immaculate Conception	Diocese of Kansas City–Saint Joseph	Kansas City, Missouri
		Cathedral of Saint Joseph	Diocese of Kansas City–Saint Joseph	St. Joseph, Missouri
		Saint Agnes Cathedral	Diocese of Springfield–Cape Girardeau	Springfield, Missouri
		Cathedral of Saint Mary of the Annunciation	Diocese of Springfield–Cape Girardeau	Cape Girardeau, Missouri
=== Ecclesiastical Province of Saint Paul and Minneapolis ===
		Cathedral of Saint Paul	Archdiocese of Saint Paul and Minneapolis	St. Paul, Minnesota
		Basilica of Saint Mary	Archdiocese of Saint Paul and Minneapolis	Minneapolis, Minnesota
		Cathedral of the Holy Spirit	Diocese of Bismarck	Bismarck, North Dakota
		Cathedral of the Immaculate Conception	Diocese of Crookston	Crookston, Minnesota
		Cathedral of Our Lady of the Rosary	Diocese of Duluth	Duluth, Minnesota
		Cathedral of Saint Mary	Diocese of Fargo	Fargo, North Dakota
		Cathedral of the Holy Trinity	Diocese of New Ulm	New Ulm, Minnesota
		Cathedral of Our Lady of Perpetual Help	Diocese of Rapid City	Rapid City, South Dakota
		Cathedral of Saint Mary	Diocese of Saint Cloud	St. Cloud, Minnesota
		Saint Joseph Cathedral	Diocese of Sioux Falls	Sioux Falls, South Dakota
		Cathedral of the Sacred Heart	Diocese of Winona-Rochester	Winona, Minnesota
		Co-Cathedral of St. John the Evangelist	Diocese of Winona-Rochester	Rochester, Minnesota
=== Ecclesiastical Province of San Antonio ===
		Cathedral of San Fernando	Archdiocese of San Antonio	San Antonio, Texas
		St. Mary's Cathedral	Diocese of Amarillo	Amarillo, Texas
		Cathedral Santuario de Guadalupe	Diocese of Dallas	Dallas, Texas
		Saint Patrick Cathedral	Diocese of El Paso	El Paso, Texas
		Cathedral of Saint Patrick	Diocese of Fort Worth	Fort Worth, Texas
		Cathedral of San Agustin	Diocese of Laredo	Laredo, Texas
		Christ the King Cathedral	Diocese of Lubbock	Lubbock, Texas
		Cathedral of the Sacred Heart	Diocese of San Angelo	San Angelo, Texas
=== Ecclesiastical Province of San Francisco ===
		Cathedral of Saint Mary of the Assumption	Archdiocese of San Francisco	San Francisco, California
		Cathedral Basilica of Our Lady of Peace	Diocese of Honolulu	Honolulu, Hawaii
		Co-Cathedral of Saint Theresa of the Child Jesus	Diocese of Honolulu	Honolulu, Hawaii
		Cathedral of Christ the Light	Diocese of Oakland	Oakland, California
		Cathedral of the Blessed Sacrament	Diocese of Sacramento	Sacramento, California
		Cathedral Basilica of Saint Joseph	Diocese of San Jose	San Jose, California
		Cathedral of Saint Eugene	Diocese of Santa Rosa	Santa Rosa, California
		Cathedral of the Annunciation	Diocese of Stockton	Stockton, California
=== Ecclesiastical Province of Santa Fe ===
		Cathedral Basilica of St. Francis of Assisi	Archdiocese of Santa Fe	Santa Fe, New Mexico
		Sacred Heart Cathedral	Diocese of Gallup	Gallup, New Mexico
		Cathedral of the Immaculate Heart of Mary	Diocese of Las Cruces	Las Cruces, New Mexico
		Cathedral of Saints Simon and Jude	Diocese of Phoenix	Phoenix, Arizona
		Cathedral of Saint Augustine	Diocese of Tucson	Tucson, Arizona
=== Ecclesiastical Province of Seattle ===
		Saint James Cathedral	Archdiocese of Seattle	Seattle, Washington
		Cathedral of Our Lady of Lourdes	Diocese of Spokane	Spokane, Washington
		Saint Paul Cathedral	Diocese of Yakima	Yakima, Washington
=== Ecclesiastical Province of Washington ===
		Cathedral of Saint Matthew the Apostle	Archdiocese of Washington	Washington, D.C.
		Saints Peter and Paul Cathedral	Diocese of Saint Thomas	Saint Thomas, U.S. Virgin Islands
=== Ecclesiastical Province of San Juan ===
		Catedral Metropolitana Basílica de San Juan Bautista	Archdiocese of San Juan de Puerto Rico	San Juan, Puerto Rico
		Catedral de San Felipe Apóstol	Diocese of Arecibo	Arecibo, Puerto Rico
		Catedral Dulce Nombre de Jesús	Diocese of Caguas	Caguas, Puerto Rico
		Catedral Santiago Apóstol	Diocese of Fajardo–Humacao	Fajardo, Puerto Rico
		Con-Catedral Dulce Nombre de Jesús	Diocese of Fajardo–Humacao	Humacao, Puerto Rico
		Catedral Nuestra Señora de la Candelaria	Diocese of Mayagüez	Mayagüez, Puerto Rico
		Catedral de Nuestra Señora de Guadalupe	Diocese of Ponce	Ponce, Puerto Rico
=== Ecclesiastical Province of Agaña ===
		Dulce Nombre de Maria Cathedral Basilica	Archdiocese of Agaña	Hagåtña, Guam
		Our Lady of Mount Carmel Cathedral	Diocese of Chalan Kanoa	Chalan Kanoa, Saipan, Northern Mariana Islands
=== Ecclesiastical Province of Samoa–Apia ===
		Cathedral of the Holy Family	Diocese of Samoa–Pago Pago	Tafuna, American Samoa
		Co-Cathedral of Saint Joseph the Worker	Diocese of Samoa–Pago Pago	Fagatogo, American Samoa

=== Personal ordinariate ===
Image	Cathedral	Ordinariate	City, State
	Cathedral of Our Lady of Walsingham	Personal Ordinariate of the Chair of Saint Peter	Houston, Texas

=== Former Latin Church cathedrals ===
Image	Cathedral	Diocese	Years	Ref
	Assumption Cathedral	Diocese of Evansville	1944–1965	
	Basilica of St. Francis Xavier	Diocese of Vincennes	1834–1898	
	Basilica of St. Joseph Proto-Cathedral	Diocese of Bardstown	1819–1841	
	Basilica of St. Louis, King of France	Archdiocese of St. Louis	1818–1914	
	Basilica of St. Patrick's Old Cathedral	Archdiocese of New York	1815–1879	
	Basilica of the Immaculate Conception	Diocese of Natchitoches	1853–1910	
	Basilica Shrine of St. Mary	Apostolic Vicariate of North Carolina	1912–1925	
	Belmont Abbey (Abbey Basilica of Mary Help of Christians)	Territorial Abbacy of Belmont–Mary Help of Christians	1910–1977	
	Cathedral of Our Lady of Mount Carmel	Diocese of Gaylord	1971–1975	
	Cathedral of Saint Francis de Sales	Diocese of Oakland	1962–1993	
	Cathedral of Saint John and Saint Finbar	Diocese of Charleston	1854–1861	
	Cathedral of St. Joseph	Archdiocese of Hartford	1892–1956	
	Cathedral of St. Raymond Nonnatus	Diocese of Joliet in Illinois	1948–1955	
	Cathedral of Saint Vibiana	Archdiocese of Los Angeles	1876–1994	
	Cathedral of Saints Peter and Paul	Diocese of Hartford; Diocese of Providence	1844–1878	
	Cathedral of the Immaculate Conception	Diocese of Crookston	1912–1990	
	Cathedral of the Immaculate Conception	Diocese of Burlington	1867–1972	
	Cathedral of the Immaculate Conception	Diocese of Burlington	1977–2018	
	Cathedral of the Immaculate Conception	Diocese of Leavenworth	1868–1947	
	Cathedral of the Sacred Hearts of Jesus and Mary	Diocese of Helena	1884–1925	
	Chapel of the Immaculate Conception	Diocese of Rapid City	1930–1962	
	Church of St. Peter	Diocese of Jefferson City	1956–1988	
	Church of Sts. Peter and Paul	Diocese of Alton	1859–1923	
	Church of the Immaculate Conception	Diocese of Fairbanks	1962–1966	
	Holy Angels Cathedral	Diocese of Saint Cloud	1889–1937	
	Holy Family Old Cathedral	Archdiocese of Anchorage	1966–2020	
	Holy Family Church	Diocese of Orange	1976–2019	
	Holy Name of Mary Pro-Cathedral	Diocese of Sault Sainte Marie	1857–1937	
	Holy Trinity Pro-Cathedral	Diocese of Evansville	1965–1999	
	Mission Santa Barbara	Diocese of Both Californias, Diocese of Monterey	1840–1849; 1853–1876	
	Old Co-Cathedral of the Sacred Heart	Archdiocese of Galveston-Houston	1959–2008	
	Old Saint Mary's Cathedral	Archdiocese of San Francisco	1854–1891	
	Old Saint Mary's Church	Diocese of Philadelphia	1808–1838	
	Our Lady of Perpetual Help Church	Diocese of Concordia	1887–1945	
	Pro-Cathedral of St. Mary	Diocese of Bismarck	1910–1945	
	Proto-Cathedral of St. James the Greater	Diocese of Nesqually	1850–1907	
	Pro-Cathedral of St. Thomas the Apostle	Apostolic Vicariate of North Carolina	1868–1912	
	Sacred Heart Cathedral	Diocese of Amarillo	1927–1975	
	Sacred Heart Cathedral	Diocese of Dodge City	1951–2001	
	Sacred Heart Cathedral	Diocese of Duluth	1896-1957	
	Sacred Heart Church	Diocese of Raleigh	1924–2017	
	Sacred Heart Cathedral	Diocese of Knoxville	1988–2018	
	St. Ann's Cathedral	Diocese of Great Falls	1904–1907	
	Ste. Anne de Detroit	Diocese of Detroit	1833–1848	
	St. Charles Borromeo Cathedral	Diocese of Orlando	1968–1976	
	St. Columba Cathedral	Diocese of Youngstown	1943–1954	
	St. Francis de Sales Chapel	Diocese of Toledo	1910–1940	
	St. James Cathedral	Diocese of Jamestown	1889–1891	
	St. James Cathedral	Diocese of Kearney	1912–1917	
	St. James Church	Diocese of Rockford	1908–1970	
	St. John's Pro-Cathedral	Diocese of Altoona	1901–1923	
	St. John the Apostle Cathedral	Archdiocese of Oregon City	1845–1862	
	St. John the Evangelist Church	Diocese of Indianapolis	1878–1906	
	St. John the Evangelist	Diocese of Philadelphia	1838–1864	
	St. Joseph New Cathedral	Diocese of Buffalo	1915–1976	
	St. Joseph Cathedral	Diocese of La Crosse	1870–1959	
	St. Joseph Old Cathedral	Diocese of Oklahoma City	1905–1931	
	St. Laurence Church	Diocese of Amarillo	1975–2011	
	St. Margaret's Cathedral	Diocese of Davenport	1881–1891	
	St. Mary Basilica	Diocese of Natchez	1837–1977	
	St. Mary's Cathedral	Diocese of Covington	1854–1901	
	St. Mary's Cathedral	Diocese of Chicago	1843–1871	
	St. Mary's on the Flats	Diocese of Cleveland	1847–1852	
	St. Mary's Cathedral	Diocese of Ogdensburg	1872–1947	
	St. Mary's Cathedral	Diocese of Peoria	1875–1889	
	St. Mary's Church	Diocese of Albany	1847–1852	
	St. Mary's Church	Diocese of Lincoln	1887–1965	
	St. Mary's of Seven Sorrows Church	Diocese of Nashville	1847–1914	
	St. Monica Church	Archdiocese of Cincinnati	1938–1957	
	St. Patrick's Cathedral	Diocese of Rochester	1868–1937	
	St. Patrick Church	Diocese of Columbus	1867–1872	
	St. Patrick Church	Diocese of Grass Valley	1868–1886	
	St. Patrick's Church	Diocese of Lead	1902–1930	
	St. Patrick's Church	Archdiocese of New Orleans	1850–18??	
	St. Patrick Pro-Cathedral	Archdiocese of Newark	1865–1956	
	St. Patrick Proto-Cathedral	Diocese of San Jose	1981–1990	
	St. Peter's Church	Diocese of Allegheny	1876–1889	
	St. Peter's Church	Diocese of Richmond	1850–1906	
	St. Peter's Pro-Cathedral	Archdiocese of Baltimore	1789–1821	
	Saints Peter and Paul Church	Diocese of Detroit	1848–1877	
	St. Philomena's Cathedral	Diocese of Omaha	1908–1916	
	St. Raphael Cathedral	Diocese of Dubuque	1837–1861	
	St. Raphael Cathedral	Diocese of Madison	1946–2005	
	St. Thomas Pro-Cathedral	Diocese of Winona	1889–1950	

== Eastern Catholic cathedrals ==
=== Ukrainian Greek Catholic cathedrals ===
The Ukrainian Greek Catholic Church in the United States is organized into a metropolia (or province) consisting of a metropolitan archeparchy and three suffragan eparchies.

Metropolia Map	Image	Cathedral	Eparchy	City, State
		Cathedral of the Immaculate Conception	Archeparchy of Philadelphia	Philadelphia, Pennsylvania
		St. Nicholas Cathedral	Eparchy of Chicago	Chicago, Illinois
		St. Josaphat Cathedral	Eparchy of Parma	Parma, Ohio
		St. Vladimir's Cathedral	Eparchy of Stamford	Stamford, Connecticut

=== Ruthenian Catholic cathedrals ===
The Ruthenian Catholic Church in the United States is organized into the sui iuris Province of Pittsburgh, consisting of a metropolitan archeparchy and three suffragan eparchies. The eparchies also serve the faithful of other Byzantine Rite Churches without established hierarchies in the United States, namely those of the Albanian, Belarusian, Bulgarian, Croatian, Greek, Hungarian, Italo-Albanian, Macedonian, Russian, and Slovak Byzantine Catholic Churches.

Metropolia Map	Image	Cathedral	Eparchy	City, State
		St. John the Baptist Cathedral	Archeparchy of Pittsburgh	Pittsburgh, Pennsylvania
		Cathedral of St. John the Baptist	Eparchy of Parma	Parma, Ohio
		Cathedral of St. Michael the Archangel	Eparchy of Passaic	Passaic, New Jersey
		St. Stephen Cathedral	Eparchy of Phoenix	Phoenix, Arizona

=== Eastern Catholic cathedrals of eparchies immediately subject to the Holy See ===
The following particular churches of various Eastern Rites are not suffragan to Metropolitan sees, but are instead exempt, i.e. immediately subject to the Holy See, while they remain part of their respective patriarchal, major archiepiscopal or other rite- & tradition-specific particular Churches.

Sui juris ritual church	Image	Cathedral	Eparchy	City, State
Chaldean Catholic Church		Mother of God Cathedral	Eparchy of St. Thomas the Apostle of Detroit	Southfield, Michigan
Chaldean Catholic Church		St. Peter Cathedral	Eparchy of St. Peter the Apostle of San Diego	El Cajon, California
Maronite Church		Our Lady of Lebanon Cathedral	Eparchy of St. Maron of Brooklyn	Brooklyn, New York
Maronite Church		Our Lady of Mt. Lebanon-St. Peter Cathedral	Eparchy of Our Lady of Lebanon of Los Angeles	Los Angeles, California
Maronite Church		St. Raymond Cathedral	Eparchy of Our Lady of Lebanon of Los Angeles	St. Louis, Missouri
Melkite Greek Catholic Church		Annunciation Cathedral	Eparchy of Newton	Roslindale, Massachusetts
Melkite Greek Catholic Church		St. Anne Cathedral	Eparchy of Newton	North Hollywood, California
Syriac Catholic Church		St. Toma Cathedral	Eparchy of Our Lady of Deliverance in the United States	Farmington Hills, Michigan
Syro-Malabar Catholic Church		Mar Thoma Shleeha Cathedral	Eparchy of St. Thomas of Chicago	Bellwood, Illinois

=== Eastern Catholic cathedrals of eparchies comprising the United States and Canada, and immediately subject to the Holy See ===
Several Eastern Catholic Churches have jurisdictions that include members and congregations in both the United States and Canada.

Sui juris ritual church	Image	Cathedral	Eparchy	City, State
Armenian Catholic Church		St. Gregory the Illuminator Cathedral	Eparchy of Our Lady of Nareg of the US and Canada	Glendale, California
Romanian Catholic Church		St. George Cathedral	Eparchy of St George's in Canton	Canton, Ohio
Syro-Malankara Catholic Church		St. Vincent de Paul Cathedral	Eparchy of St. Mary, Queen of Peace of the US and Canada	Elmont, New York

=== Former cathedrals ===
Image	Cathedral	Eparchy	Years	Ref
	Cathedral of St. Ann (Manhattan, New York)	Eparchy of Our Lady of Nareg of the US and Canada	1981–2002	
	Cathedral of St. John the Baptist	Eparchy of Parma	1969–2024	
	Cathedral of St. John the Baptist (Munhall, Pennsylvania)	Archeparchy of Pittsburgh	1929–1993	
	St. Joseph Cathedral (Bayonne, New Jersey)	Eparchy of Our Lady of Deliverance of Newark	2011–2022	
	St. Maron Maronite Church (Detroit, Michigan)	Eparchy of Our Lady of Lebanon of Los Angeles	1966–1977	
	Cathedral of St. Mary (Van Nuys, California)	Eparchy of Phoenix	1982–2010	

== See also ==
- List of Catholic churches in the United States
- List of cathedrals in the United States
- List of basilicas#North American & Central American Basilicas
- Catholic Marian churches
- Category:Roman Catholic church buildings in the United States (including sub-categories for shrines, cathedrals, and former churches) – churches are listed by state, territory, or D.C.
- List of Coptic Orthodox Churches in the United States
- List of the Catholic bishops of the United States
- List of the Catholic dioceses of the United States
