= Laurence Julius FitzSimon =

American prelate

His Excellency, The Most Reverend Laurence Julius FitzSimon
- Bishop of Amarillo
- Church: Roman Catholic Church
- See: Diocese of Amarillo
- In office: October 22, 1941 - July 2, 1958
- Predecessor: Robert Emmet Lucey
- Successor: John Louis Morkovsky

Orders
- Ordination: May 17, 1921 by Joseph Chartrand
- Consecration: October 22, 1941 by Amleto Giovanni Cicognani

Personal details
- Born: January 31, 1895 San Antonio, Texas, US
- Died: July 2, 1958 (aged 63) Amarillo, Texas, US
- Education: Pontifical North American College; St. Meinrad's Seminary
- Motto: Reguet pacis princeps (Ruled by the Prince of Peace)

Laurence Julius FitzSimon (January 31, 1895 – July 2, 1958) was an American prelate of the Roman Catholic Church. He served as bishop of the Diocese of Amarillo in Texas from 1941 until his death in 1958.

== Biography ==
=== Early life ===
Laurence FitzSimon was born on January 31, 1895, in San Antonio, Texas, to John and Theodora (née Okelmann) FitzSimon. His family moved to Castroville, Texas, the following year. He entered St. Anthony's College in San Antonio in 1907, then went to the Pontifical North American College in Rome in 1911. In 1916, bad health forced FitzSimon to return to Texas.

After recuperating, FitzSimon enlisted in the United States Navy. He served as a pharmacist's mate on a minesweeper during World War I. After his discharge from the Navy in 1919, he resumed his theological studies at St. Meinrad's Seminary in St. Meinrad, Indiana.

=== Priesthood ===
FitzSimon was ordained to the priesthood by Bishop Joseph Chartrand for the Archdiocese of San Antonio on May 17, 1921, at St. Meinrad. After his ordination, the archdiocese assigned FitzSimon to the faculty of St. John's Seminary in San Antonio. In 1926, he left St. John's to serve as pastor of a parish in Runge, Texas. He later became pastor of a parish in Kenedy, Texas, and in 1932 was assigned to one in Seguin, Texas. FitzSimon also served as chancellor of the archdiocese from 1932 to 1941.

=== Bishop of Amarillo ===
On August 1, 1941, FitzSimon was appointed the third bishop of Amarillo by Pope Pius XII. He received his episcopal consecration on October 22, 1941, at the Cathedral of San Fernando in San Antonio, Texas, from Archbishop Amleto Cicognani, with Bishops Mariano Garriga and Sidney Matthew Metzger serving as co-consecrators. FitzSimon was installed at Amarillo on November 5, 1941. During his 17-year tenure, the number of churches, priests, schools, and institutions in the diocese more than doubled.

In September 1945, several months after the end of World War II, FitzSimon wrote a letter to US Congressman Francis E. Worley protesting the conditions at the Italian prisoner of war camp in Hereford, Texas. FitzSimon had visited the camp in July 1945 and seen that prisoners were receiving low rations of substandard quality. They also told him stories of beatings and other mistreatment.

FitzSimon was a chronicler of the history of Catholicism in Texas, gathering historical material on its bishops and clerics during trips to Rome and France. In 1951, Cardinal Pierre-Marie Gerlier awarded FitzSimon the title of Chanoine d'Honneur de la Primatiale (Canon of Honor of the Primate) in recognition of his scholarship.FitzSimon suffered a stroke in 1954, but was able to continue his work as bishop.

=== Death and legacy ===
Laurence FitzSimon died on July 2, 1958, at St. Anthony's Hospital in Amarillo at age 63. He is buried in Llano Cemetery in Amarillo.

Catholic Church titles
Preceded by Robert Emmet Lucey	Bishop of Amarillo; 1941–1958	Succeeded by John Louis Morkovsky
