= Sacred Heart Cathedral (Amarillo, Texas) =

Former cathedral church in Amarillo, Texas, United States

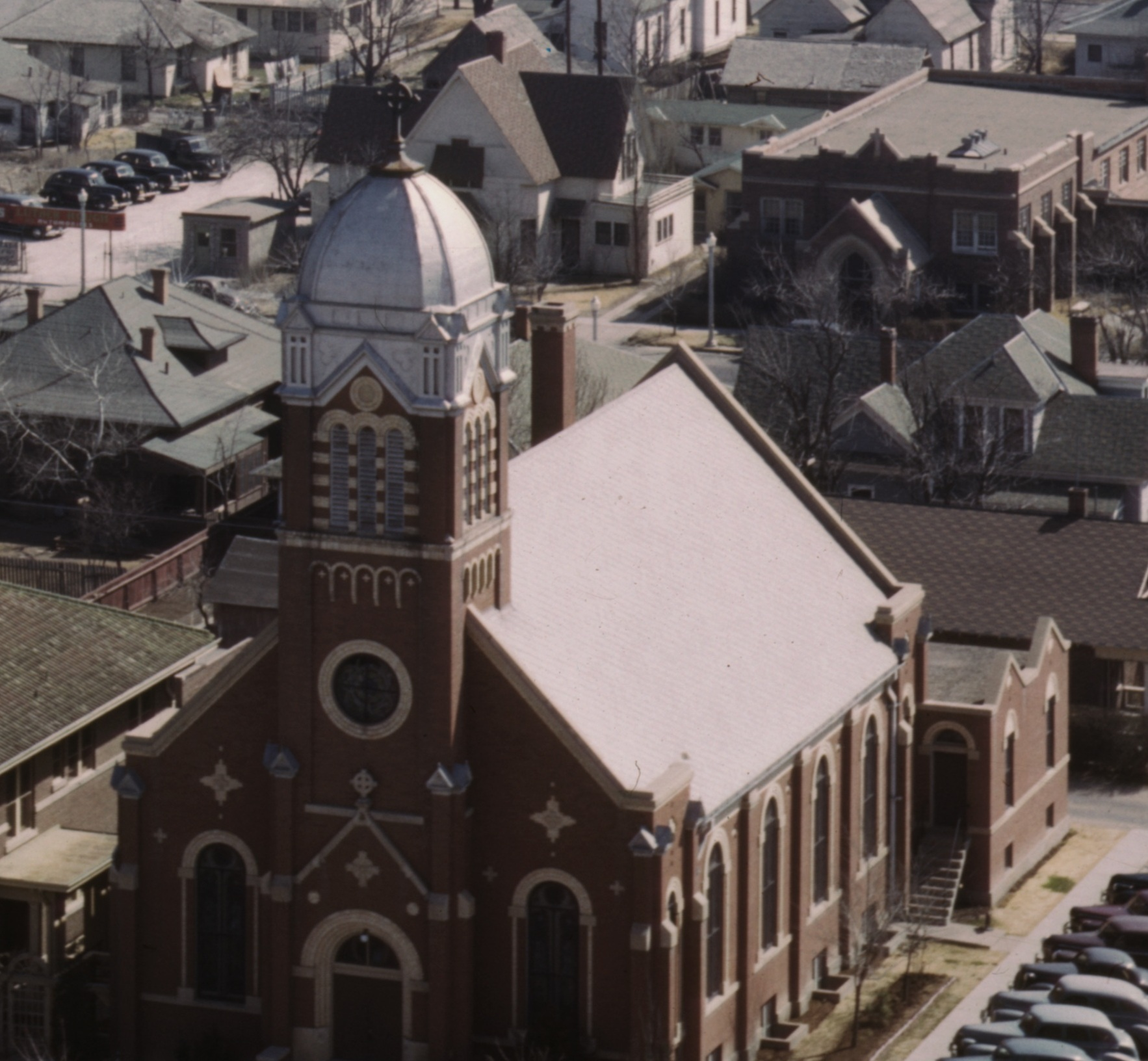
- Sacred Heart Cathedral in 1943

Religion
- Affiliation: Catholic Church
- Diocese: Diocese of Amarillo
- Ecclesiastical or organisational status: Deconsecrated; Torn down in 1975

Location
- Location: Amarillo, Texas; United States
- Interactive map of Sacred Heart Cathedral
- Coordinates: 35°12′17″N 101°50′10″W

Architecture
- Style: Romanesque Revival
- Completed: 1916
- Construction cost: $18,000

Specifications
- Capacity: 350
- Materials: Brick

Sacred Heart Cathedral is a former cathedral church located in Amarillo, Texas, United States. It was the seat of the Diocese of Amarillo from 1927 to 1975.

== History ==
=== Sacred Heart Parish ===
The Rev. David H. Dunn, pastor of St. Mary’s Church in Clarendon, had the first Sacred Heart Church built in 1903. The first $400 for the fund drive came out of his own funds. Ground was broken on March 17, 1903 and the first Mass was held on August 2 of the same year. The church was dedicated on October 18. As Amarillo grew it became obvious that Sacred Heart was in need of a new church. In 1909 property was purchased at the corner of Ninth and Taylor Streets for $5,000. The new church was built for $18,000 seven years later. The red brick building with white trim was built in the Romanesque Revival style. The first Mass in the uncompleted church was Father Dunn’s funeral on October 5, 1916. The church was opened for regular use in January 1917 and it was dedicated on April 13, 1918 by Bishop Joseph Patrick Lynch of Dallas. The old church was moved to the corner of Cleveland and 11th Streets and became Our Lady of Guadalupe Church. A two-story rectory was built next to the church in 1922 for $16,000.

=== Sacred Heart Cathedral ===
On August 3, 1926 Pope Pius XI established the diocese of Amarillo. Sacred Heart Church became the cathedral for the new diocese. On April 27, 1927 Bishop Rudolph Gerken was installed in Sacred Heart as the first Bishop of Amarillo.

In 1944, Sacred Heart Cathedral bought St. Mary’s Academy from the Sisters of Charity of the Incarnate Word for $85,000. It became the Cathedral School. Three years later a chapel from an Air Force base was moved to the school property and became a chapel of convenience for the cathedral parish. A new convent for the Sisters of Charity of the Incarnate Word was built in 1950. In 1959 this property became St. Mary’s Parish, which became the Amarillo Diocese’s third cathedral in 2011.

A total of 5 bishops would call Sacred Heart their cathedral. By the 1970s the parish had declined to 25 families. In 1974 the property was sold to the First National Bank of Amarillo for $250,000. The final Mass in the cathedral was celebrated on January 19, 1975 by Bishop Lawrence M. DeFalco. The Cathedral Story was presented by students from Alamo Catholic High School. Msgr. Francis A. Smyer gave the homily and the Marion Mass in D minor was sung by the combined choirs of Sacred Heart and St. Laurence. Sacred Heart was torn down after the final Mass and replaced by St. Laurence Cathedral. The windows and other articles from Sacred Heart are currently in use at St. Mary’s Cathedral in Amarillo.

== See also ==
- List of Catholic cathedrals in the United States
- List of cathedrals in the United States
