= John Yanta =

Roman Catholic prelate (1931–2022)

His Excellency, The Most Reverend John Walter Yanta
- Bishop of Amarillo
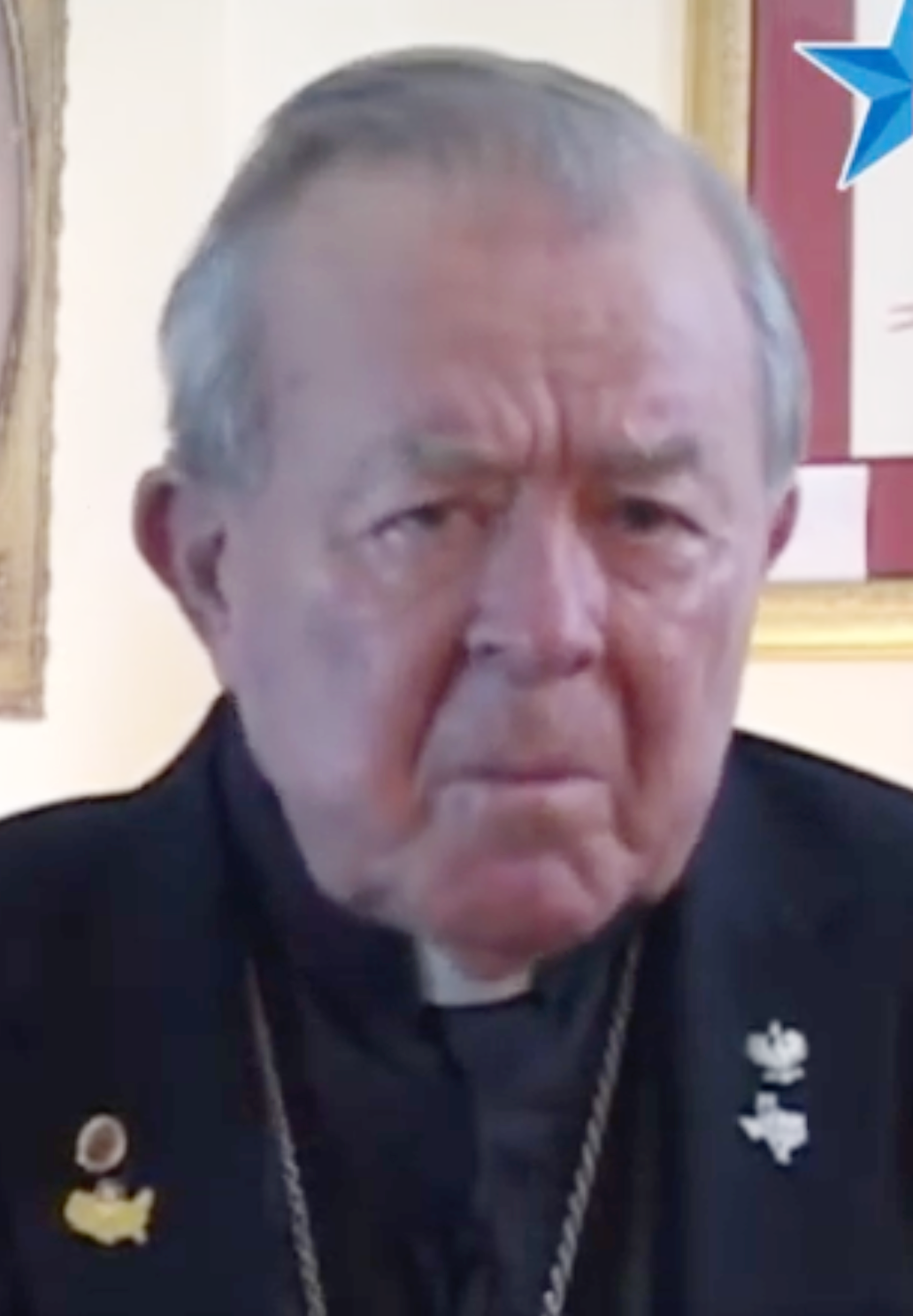
- Church: Catholic Church
- Diocese: Amarillo
- Appointed: January 21, 1997
- Installed: March 17, 1997
- Term ended: January 3, 2008
- Predecessor: Leroy Matthiesen
- Successor: Patrick Zurek
- Previous post: Auxiliary Bishop of San Antonio

Orders
- Ordination: March 17, 1956 by Robert Emmet Lucey
- Consecration: December 30, 1994 by Patrick Flores, Alfons Nossol, and Charles Victor Grahmann

Personal details
- Born: October 2, 1931 Runge, Texas, U.S.
- Died: August 6, 2022 (aged 90) San Antonio, Texas, U.S.

Styles of John Walter Yanta
- Reference style: His Excellency; The Most Reverend
- Spoken style: Your Excellency
- Religious style: Bishop

John Walter Yanta (October 2, 1931 – August 6, 2022) was an American prelate of the Roman Catholic Church. He served as bishop of the Diocese of Amarillo in Texas from 1997 to 2008 and as an auxiliary bishop in the Archdiocese of San Antonio in Texas from 1994 to 1997.

== Biography ==
=== Early years ===
On March 17, 1956, Yanta was ordained into the priesthood for the Archdiocese of San Antonio at the Cathedral of San Fernando in San Antonio by Archbishop Robert Lucey. In 1957, Yanta was assigned as assistant pastor at St. Ann's Parish in San Antonio.

During this period, Yanta would frequently join protests in front of a Planned Parenthood clinic in San Antonio, protesting its abortion services to women. He was arrested during one protest for disturbing the peace. In 1981, Yanta and Reverend Larry Steubben founded Catholic Television of San Antonio (CTSA).

=== Auxiliary Bishop of San Antonio ===
On December 30, 1994, Pope John Paul II appointed Yanta as an auxiliary bishop of San Antonio. He was consecrated by Archbishop Patrick Flores at the Immaculate Conception Church in Panna Maria, Texas.

=== Bishop of Amarillo ===
On January 21, 1997, John Paul II named Yanta as bishop of Amarillo. He was installed on March 17, 1997.

On July 10, 2002, Yanta and the Diocese of Amarillo were named in a lawsuit for the rape of a teenage girl in 2000 by Reverend Rosendo Herrera, a diocese priest. When the plaintiff was age 17, Herrera raped and impregnated her. The suit claimed that the diocese was aware of previous offenses by Herrera, and had failed to notify authorities as required by state law.

By September 2002, eight priests had resigned from the diocese due to sexual abuse allegations. In February 2003, Yanta agreed to a US$27,000 legal settlement with the family of the girl raped by Herrera in 2000.

=== Retirement and death ===
Yanta retired as bishop of Amarillo on January 3, 2008. After his retirement, Yanta moved to San Antonio where he was active in socially conservative political causes. In 2011, Yanta established the Polish Heritage Center Foundation and bought land in Panna Maria to build the Polish Heritage Center, a museum about Polish immigrants to Texas. In 2021, Yanta spent a week in the hospital due to a case of pneumonia.

John Yanta died in San Antonio on August 6, 2022, at age 90.

== Viewpoints ==
=== Politics ===
On May 14, 2009, Yanta sent a letter of protest to Reverend John I. Jenkins, the president of the University of Notre Dame in Indiana, about the university inviting US President Barack Obama to its commencement ceremony. In the letter, Yanta stated:

I also see Notre Dame crucifying Our Lord once again. Our Blessed Mother must be sorrowful for what you are doing to her Son, using her name in doing so.

=== Sexual abuse scandal ===
In 2002, Yanta criticized the "zero tolerance" policies on sexual abuse by priests that were adopted by the US Conference of Catholic Bishops in June 2002. He argued that one-time offenders who had gone through counseling should not be punished for their crimes. However, Yanta admitted that his predecessor, Bishop Leroy T. Matthiesen, had recruited many of the problem priests out of treatment programs and kept that information secret from parishioners.

== See also ==
- Catholic Church hierarchy
- Catholic Church in the United States
- Historical list of the Catholic bishops of the United States
- List of Catholic bishops of the United States
- Lists of patriarchs, archbishops, and bishops

== Episcopal succession ==
Catholic Church titles
Preceded by Leroy Matthiesen	Bishop of Amarillo; 1997–2008	Succeeded by Patrick Zurek
Preceded by –	Auxiliary Bishop of San Antonio; 1994–1997	Succeeded by –
Preceded by Patrick Vincent Hurley	Titular Bishop of Naratcata; 1994–1997	Succeeded by José de Jesús Martínez Zepeda
