= Rudolph Gerken =

Roman Catholic archbishop

His Excellency, The Most Reverend Rudolph Aloysius Gerken
- Archbishop of Santa Fe
- Church: Roman Catholic Church
- See: Archdiocese of Santa Fe
- In office: August 23, 1933 - March 2, 1943
- Other posts: Bishop of Amarillo; 1926 to 1933

Orders
- Ordination: June 10, 1917 by Joseph Lynch
- Consecration: April 26, 1927 by Joseph Lynch

Personal details
- Born: March 7, 1887 Dyersville, Iowa, US
- Died: March 2, 1943 (aged 55) Santa Fe, New Mexico, US
- Education: Pio Nono College; St. Joseph's College; Kenrick Seminary
- Motto: Not me but you, O Lord

Styles of Rudolph Gerken
- Reference style: The Most Reverend
- Spoken style: His Excellency
- Religious style: Monsignor
- Posthumous style: none

Rudolph Aloysius Gerken (March 7, 1887 – March 2, 1943) was an American prelate of the Roman Catholic Church. He served as archbishop of the Archdiocese of Santa Fe in New Mexico from 1933 until his death in 1943. He previously served as bishop of the Diocese of Amarillo in Texas from 1926 to 1933.

== Biography ==
=== Early life ===
Rudolph Gerken was born on March 7, 1887, in Dyersville, Iowa, the sixth of seven children of William and Elizabeth (née Sudmeier) Gerken. After Elizabeth died 1889, William married Carolina Wuebbelt, with whom he had six more children. Raised on a family farm, Gerken studied at Pio Nono College in St. Francis, Wisconsin, and St. Joseph's College in Rensselaer, Indiana. After graduating from college, Gerken moved to Texas, where he taught in the public schools for Scotland, Texas, from 1910 to 1912. He later joined the faculty at the University of Dallas.

After discussions with Bishop Joseph Lynch, Gerken decided to become a priest. He travelled to St. Louis, Missouri, to study theology at Kenrick Seminary, where he also taught languages.

=== Priesthood ===
Gerken was ordained to the priesthood for the Diocese of Dallas by Lynch on June 10, 1917. After his ordination, the diocese assigned Gerken as pastor of Sacred Heart Parish in Abilene, Texas. He was transferred in 1919 to be pastor of St. Rita's Parish in Ranger, Texas. In 1924, Gerken was named dean and consultor of the diocese.

=== Bishop of Amarillo ===
On August 25, 1926, Gerken was appointed the first bishop of Amarillo by Pope Pius XI. He received his episcopal consecration on April 26, 1927, from Bishop Lynch, with Bishops Christopher Byrne and Francis Kelley serving as co-consecrators, in Sacred Heart Cathedral. Gerken chose as his episcopal motto, "Not me but you, O Lord." During his tenure in Amarillo, Gerken oversaw the construction of thirty-five churches. He also founded Price Memorial College, a secondary school for boys in Amarillo, and served as its first president.

=== Archbishop of Santa Fe ===
Pius XI named Gerken as the seventh archbishop of Santa Fe on June 2, 1933. He was installed on August 23, 1933. As archbishop, Gerken established another diocese and several parishes, sought to provide relief to American prisoners of war in Japan during World War II, and presided over the marriage of actress Jane Wyatt and Edgar Ward in 1935. He was a Rotarian and was known to quote Aristotle and St. Francis of Assisi. In December 1937, Gerken called on Catholics in the archdiocese to not attend a Christmas ball sponsored by the Santa Fe Maternal Health Center, terming the organization a "birth control clinic."

=== Death and legacy ===
After suffering a stroke that left his right side paralyzed, Rudolph Gerken died on March 2, 1943, at St. Vincent's Hospital in Santa Fe, New Mexico.

Catholic Church titles
Preceded by None	Bishop of Amarillo; 1926–1933	Succeeded by Robert Emmet Lucey
Preceded by Albert Daeger, OFM	Archbishop of Santa Fe; 1933–1943	Succeeded by Edwin Byrne
