= Robert Emmet Lucey =

American Catholic archbishop (1891–1977)

His Excellency, The Most Reverend Robert Emmet Lucey
- Archbishop of San Antonio
- Church: Catholic Church
- See: Archdiocese of San Antonio
- In office: March 27, 1941 - July 4, 1969
- Predecessor: Arthur Jerome Drossaerts
- Successor: Francis James Furey
- Other posts: Bishop of Amarillo; 1934 to 1941

Orders
- Ordination: May 14, 1916 by Giuseppe Ceppetelli
- Consecration: March 1, 1934 by Amleto Cicognani

Personal details
- Born: March 16, 1891 Los Angeles, California, US
- Died: August 1, 1977 (aged 86) San Antonio, Texas
- Education: St. Vincent's College; Saint Patrick's Seminary; University of the Propaganda
- Motto: Dominus rex noster (The Lord is our king)

Styles of Robert Emmet Lucey
- Reference style: The Most Reverend
- Spoken style: His Excellency
- Religious style: Monsignor
- Posthumous style: not applicable

Robert Emmet Lucey (March 16, 1891 – August 1, 1977) was an American prelate of the Catholic Church. He served as the second bishop of the Diocese of Amarillo in Texas from 1934 to 1941 and as the second archbishop of Archdiocese of San Antonio in Texas from 1941 to 1969.

== Biography ==
=== Early life ===
Lucey was born in Los Angeles, California, to John Joseph and Marie Lucey on March 16, 1891. He began his college education at St. Vincent's College and completed the rest at Saint Patrick's Seminary in Menlo Park, California, in 1912. Lucey then went to Rome to reside at the Pontifical North American College. In 1916, he received a Doctor of Sacred Theology degree at the University of the Propaganda there.

=== Priesthood ===
On May 14, 1916, Lucey was ordained a priest for the Diocese of Monterey-Los Angeles in the Church of St. Apollinaris in Rome by Archbishop Giuseppe Ceppetelli.

During the next five years in Los Angeles, Lucey was assistant pastor of several parishes which included St. Vibiana's Cathedral, Immaculate Conception Parish, Immaculate Heart of Mary Parish, and was pastor at St. Anthony's in Long Beach from 1929 to 1934. Among the positions that he held were chaplain of the Newman Club at the University of Los Angeles and diocesan director of Catholic Charities (1921–1925) of the California Conference of Social Work (1923–24), director of Catholic Hospitals for the diocese (1924–1934), and board member of the California State Department of Social Welfare (1924–1930).

=== Bishop of Amarillo ===
Lucey was appointed bishop of Amarillo by Pope Pius XI on February 10, 1934. On March 1, 1934, Archbishop Amleto Giovanni Cicognani consecrated Lucey at St. Vibiana's Cathedral in Los Angeles. There he established a newspaper called the Texas Panhandle Register.

=== Archbishop of San Antonio ===
On January 23, 1941, Pope Pius XII appointed Lucey as archbishop of San Antonio. He was installed by Cicognani at the Cathedral of San Fernando in San Antonio on March 27, 1941. Lucey helped establish the Yorktown Memorial Hospital in Yorktown, Texas, the Czech Catholic Home for the Aged in El Campo, Texas, and the Huth Memorial Hospital in Yoakum, Texas. Lucey also created 29 clinics throughout Southwest Texas.

In the early 1950s, Lucey ordered the racial integration of all schools in the archdiocese. He also stipulated that the archdiocese only use unionized labor for its construction projects and supported union organizing efforts by farm workers in Texas. In 1965, he gave his full support to the national War on Poverty program of the Johnson Administration. Furey cofounded the juvenile rehabilitation program the Patrician Movement and created the equal play advocacy organization Project Equality in 1965.

In September 1968, while dedicating a new church rectory in Stonewall, Texas, with US President Lyndon B. Johnson in attendance, Lucey praised the American involvement in the Vietnam War. Lucey contented that our military intervention reflected the peace efforts of Pope Paul VI. However, the pope had previously called on Johnson to stop the bombing of North Vietnam. Lucey later took a trip to Saigon in what was then South Vietnam to serve as an observer to the 1967 presidential election.

=== Retirement and legacy ===
On July 4, 1969, Paul VI accepted Lucey's resignation as archbishop of San Antonio. Lucey died in San Antonio on August 1, 1977. He was buried at Holy Cross Cemetery, which had been built on a plot of land in Bexar County that he had acquired for the church.

Catholic Church titles
Preceded by Rudolph Gerken	Bishop of Amarillo; 16 May 1934 – 23 January 1941	Succeeded by Laurence Julius FitzSimon
Preceded by Arthur Jerome Drossaerts	Archbishop of San Antonio; 23 January 1941 – 23 May 1969	Succeeded by Francis James Furey
Preceded by Jean Guénolé Louis Marie Daniélou, S.J	Titular bishop of Tauromenium; 23 May 1969 – 31 Dec 1970	Succeeded by Edoardo Rovida
