= John Louis Morkovsky =

American prelate

His Excellency, The Most Reverend John Louis Morkovsky
- Bishop of Galveston-Houston
- Church: Roman Catholic Church
- See: Diocese of Galveston-Houston
- In office: April 22, 1975 – August 21, 1984
- Predecessor: Wendelin Joseph Nold
- Successor: Joseph Fiorenza
- Previous posts: Coadjutor Bishop of Galveston-Houston 1963 to 1975; Bishop of Amarillo; 1958 to 1963; Auxiliary Bishop of Amarillo; 1956 to 1958

Orders
- Ordination: December 5, 1933 by Francesco Marchetti Selvaggiani
- Consecration: February 22, 1956 by Amleto Giovanni Cicognani

Personal details
- Born: August 16, 1909 Praha, Texas, US
- Died: March 24, 1990 (aged 80) Tacoma, Washington, US
- Education: College of the Propaganda; Pontifical Gregorian University; Catholic University of America
- Motto: Pax diligentibus legem (Peace to those who love the law)

John Ludvik Morkovsky (August 16, 1909 – March 24, 1990) was an American prelate of the Roman Catholic Church. He served as bishop of the Diocese of Galveston–Houston in Texas from 1975 to 1984.

Morkovsky previously served as coadjutor bishop of Galveston–Houston from 1963 to 1975, bishop of the Diocese of Amarillo in Texas from 1958 to 1963 and as auxiliary bishop of Amarillo from 1956 to 1958.

== Biography ==
=== Early life ===
The seventh of ten children, John Morkovsky was born on August 16, 1909, in Praha, Texas, to Alois and Marie (née Raska) Morkovsky. Alois Morkovsky immigrated to the United States from Moravia (now part of the Czech Republic), while Marie Raska was the daughter of Moravian immigrants. John Morkovsky was baptized by Reverend Louis P. Netardus at his parents' home.

Morkovsky entered St. John's Seminary in San Antonio in 1924. He was sent in 1930 to study in Rome at the College of the Propaganda and the Pontifical Gregorian University.

=== Priesthood ===
While in Rome, Morkovsky was ordained to the priesthood for the Archdiocese of San Antonio by Cardinal Francesco Marchetti Selvaggiani on December 5, 1933. He earned his doctorate in theology in Rome in 1936.

On his return to Texas in 1936, Morkovsky was assigned as a curate at St. Michael's parish in Weimar, Texas. He was transferred in 1939 to St. Anne's Parish in San Antonio. In 1940, Morkovsky was appointed as professor of canon law, Latin and philosophy at St. John's Seminary. He briefly served as pastor of St. Francis de Paula Parish and superintendent of Catholic schools in San Antonio.

In 1941, Morkovsky was sent to Washington, D.C. to study at the Catholic University of America, obtaining a Master of Arts degree in education. He returned to Texas in 1943 to resume his position as superintendent of Catholic Schools in San Antonio. During that time, he also held the following posts:

- Judge of the archdiocesan matrimonial court (1944–1956)
- Pastor of St. Leo's Parish in San Antonio (1945–1954)
- Archdiocesan consultor (1947–1956)
- Pastor of St. Mary Magdalene's Parish in San Antonio (1954–1956)
- Moderator of the San Antonio Deanery Council of Catholic Women
- Director of the local chapter of the Legion of Decency

Morkovsky also organized the Federation of Catholic Parents' and Teachers' Clubs in San Antonio.

=== Auxiliary Bishop and Bishop of Amarillo ===
On December 22, 1955, Morkovsky was appointed auxiliary bishop of Amarillo and titular bishop of Hieron by Pope Pius XII. He received his episcopal consecration on February 22, 1956, at the Cathedral of San Fernando in San Antonio, Texas, from Archbishop Amleto Cicognani, with Bishops Mariano Garriga and Sidney Metzger serving as co-consecrators. In addition to his duties as auxiliary bishop, he also served as chancellor and vicar general of the diocese. Pius XII named Morkovsky the fourth bishop of Amarillo on August 18, 1958.

=== Coadjutor Bishop and Bishop of Galveston-Houston ===
On April 16, 1963, Morkovsky was appointed coadjutor bishop of Galveston-Houston and titular bishop of Tigava by Pope John XXIII. He became apostolic administrator of the diocese under Bishop Wendelin Nold, who suffered from near total blindness. He also attended the Second Vatican Council from 1962 to 1965. In 1964 he founded the diocesan newspaper The Texas Catholic Herald and hosted the visit of Cardinal Josef Beran. Morkovsky established the first diocesan mission in Guatemala City in 1966, and the Hospital Chaplains Corps at Houston Medical Center in 1968. From 1970 to 1972, Morkovsky was the first Catholic bishop to preside over the Texas Conference of Churches.

On April 22, 1975, Morkovsky automatically succeeded Nold as the sixth bishop of Galveston-Houston . During his tenure, he established African American and Mexican American ministries and gave special attention to low-income parishioners and Houston's large Vietnamese community. The Catholic Church in Texas continued to experience tremendous growth which helped lead to further divisions of the diocese, including the Diocese of Beaumont (1966), the Diocese of Victoria (1982), and the Diocese of Tyler (1987).

=== Retirement and legacy ===
On August 21, 1984, Pope John Paul II accepted Morkovsky's resignation as bishop of Galveston-Houston. He continued to live in his home on the grounds of St. Mary's Seminary in Houston.

On March 24, 1990, Morkovsky died at age 80 from a stroke in Tacoma, Washington, where he was visiting relatives. He is buried at Holy Cross Cemetery in Houston.

Catholic Church titles
Preceded by Wendelin Joseph Nold	Bishop of Galveston-Houston; 1975–1984	Succeeded by Joseph Fiorenza
Preceded by –	Coadjutor Bishop of Galveston-Houston; 1963–1975	Succeeded by –
Preceded by Laurence Julius FitzSimon	Bishop of Amarillo; 1958–1963	Succeeded by Lawrence Michael De Falco
