= Lawrence Michael De Falco =

American prelate

His Excellency, The Most Reverend Lawrence Michael DeFalco
- Bishop of Amarillo
- Church: Roman Catholic Church
- See: Diocese of Amarillo

Orders
- Ordination: December 5, 1933 by Francesco Marchetti Selvaggiani
- Consecration: February 22, 1956 by Amleto Giovanni Cicognani

Personal details
- Born: August 25, 1915 McKeesport, Pennsylvania, US
- Died: September 22, 1979 (aged 64) Amarillo, Texas , US
- Education: St. Vincent's College; St. John's Home Mission Seminary; Pontifical Gregorian University
- Motto: Gressus meos dirige (Direct my steps)

Lawrence Michael DeFalco (August 25, 1915 – September 22, 1979) was an American prelate of the Roman Catholic Church. He served as Bishop of Amarillo from 1963 to 1979.

== Biography ==
=== Early life ===
The eldest of nine children, Lawrence DeFalco was born on August 25, 1915, in McKeesport, Pennsylvania, to Rosario and Margret (née Desmone) DeFalco. His father came from Atena Lucana, Italy and worked as a streetcar company foreman. Lawrence DeFalco entered St. Vincent's College at Latrobe, Pennsylvania in 1933. However, he was forced to enter St. John's Home Mission Seminary at Little Rock, Arkansas, in 1935, due to the Great Depression.

=== Priesthood ===
DeFalco was ordained to the priesthood for the Diocese of Dallas on June 11, 1942 by Bishop John Baptist Morris. After his ordination, the diocese assigned Morris as a curate at St. Patrick's Parish in Fort Worth. In 1952, he was named vice-chancellor of what was now the Diocese of Dallas-Fort Worth. He briefly served as a curate at Sacred Heart Cathedral in Dallas before being sent in 1953 to study at the Pontifical Gregorian University in Rome. He received a Licentiate of Canon Law from the Gregorian. Following his return to Dallas in 1955, DeFalco was appointed secretary of the diocesan marriage tribunal. He served as the founding pastor of Our Lady of Perpetual Help Parish in Dallas in 1956. The Vatican elevated DeFalco to the rank of papal chamberlain in 1961, and he was named rector of St. Patrick Co-Cathedral in Fort Worth in 1962.

=== Bishop of Amarillo ===
On April 16, 1963, DeFalco was appointed fifth bishop of Amarillo by Pope John XXIII. He received his episcopal consecration on May 30, 1963 from Bishop Thomas Kiely Gorman, with Bishops Francis Joseph Green and Albert Lewis Fletcher serving as co-consecrators, at the St. Patrick Co-Cathedral. He was installed at Sacred Heart Cathedral in Amarillo on June 13, 1963.

Between 1963 and 1965, DeFalco attended three sessions of the Second Vatican Council in Rome. During his 16-year-long tenure, he worked to implement the council's reforms, establishing pastoral councils and senates of priests, of nuns, and of deacons. He also reduced diocesan debt, but was forced to close several schools and hospitals. St. Laurence Church in Amarillo replaced Sacred Heart as the diocesan cathedral in 1975.

=== Death and legacy ===
After being diagnosed with pancreatic cancer, DeFalco resigned as bishop of Amarillo on August 28, 1979. He died on September 22, 1979, in Amarillo at age 64. He is buried at Llano Cemetery in Amarillo.

Catholic Church titles
Preceded by John Louis Morkovsky	Bishop of Amarillo; 1963—1979	Succeeded by Leroy Matthiesen
