= Leroy Matthiesen =

Catholic bishop (1921–2010)

His Excellency, The Most Reverend Leroy T. Matthiesen
- Bishop of Amarillo
- Church: Catholic Church
- Appointed: March 18, 1980
- In office: May 30, 1980 – January 21, 1997
- Predecessor: Lawrence Michael De Falco
- Successor: John Yanta

Orders
- Ordination: March 10, 1946 by Amleto Giovanni Cicognani
- Consecration: May 30, 1980 by Patrick Flores

Personal details
- Born: June 11, 1921 Olfen, Texas, US
- Died: March 22, 2010 (aged 88) Amarillo, Texas, US
- Education: Pontifical College Josephinum
- Motto: Fiat vountas tua (Thy will be done)

Leroy Matthiesen (June 11, 1921 – March 22, 2010) was an American prelate of the Roman Catholic Church. He served as the sixth bishop of the Diocese of Amarillo in Texas from 1980 to 1997.

== Biography ==
=== Early life ===
Leroy Matthiesen was born June 11, 1921, in Olfen, an unincorporated community in Runnels County, Texas. He grew up on a cotton farm. Deciding to become a priest, he attended the Pontifical College Josephinum in Worthington, Ohio.

=== Priesthood ===
Matthiesen was ordained a priest at the Josephinum by Cardinal Amleto Cicognani for the Diocese of Amarillo on March 10, 1946. After receiving a Master of Journalism degree in 1948, Matthiesen was appointed editor of the diocesan newspaper The West Texas Catholic. The paper featured his column “Wise and Otherwise” until 1998.

In 1954, Matthiesen was appointed the founding pastor of St. Laurence Parish in Amarillo. In 1961. he received a Master of School Administration degree and in 1962 was appointed rector of St. Lucian's Preparatory Seminary in Amarillo.

Matthiesen was awarded a Doctor of Journalism degree in 1961, and in 1968 was named principal of Alamo Catholic High School. During this period, he also served for nine years as pastor of St. Francis Parish in Amarillo.

=== Bishop of Amarillo ===
On May 30, 1980, Pope John Paul II appointed Matthiesen as bishop of Amarillo. He was consecrated on May 30, 1980, at the Amarillo Civic Center by Archbishop Patrick Flores. Matthiesen received the Isaac Hecker Award for Social Justice in 1984. In September 1981, in protest of the assembly of the neutron bomb at a facility in Pantex, Texas, Matthiesen called for workers there to resign their jobs in protest. None were reported to have obeyed his call. He remarked:

''I'm no rabble rouser. On the whole I accomplished what I wanted to by bringing an issue to the consciousness of people. It's amazing how people have begun to live with the unlivable.''

In 1992, Matthiessen called for a stay of execution for Johnny Frank Garrett, a Texas man convicted of raping and murdering 76 year-old Sister Tadea Benz at an Amarillo convent. Garrett was executed on February 12, 1992.

Matthiesen admitted eight priests into the Diocese of Amarillo after they had undergone treatment following accusations of sexual impropriety. His most controversial priest assignments were Reverend Orville Blum, whom Mattheisen appointed as principal of Alamo Catholic High School in Amarillo and pastor of Sacred Heart Parish in Amarillo. In addition, Reverends John Salazar-Jimenez and Ed Graff were admitted into the diocese by Matthiesen. Both of these priests were known to be serious sexual abusers and Matthiesen was warned not to assign them to parishes by other Catholic officials.

=== Retirement and legacy ===
On January 21, 1997, John Paul II accepted Matthiesen's resignation as bishop of Amarillo. Matthiesen received the Ketteler Award for Social Justice from the Sisters of Divine Providence in 2002. In 2002, he celebrated mass at a conference center in Louisville, Kentucky, to commemorate the 25th anniversary of New Ways Ministry, an advocacy group for LGBTQ Catholics. This mass violated a Vatican directive not to celebrate mass for this group.

In 2003, the diocese settled a lawsuit brought by a Texas woman. She claimed that Reverend Rosendo Herrera, a priest in the diocese, had impregnated her when she was 17 years old. The plaintiff claimed that the diocese and Matthiessen tried to cover up the scandal. The diocese settled for approximately $27,000 for the child. In November 2004, the diocese settled a lawsuit for $50,000 in which Matthiessen was listed as a codefendant. A different female plaintiff claimed that Herrera had engaged in wrongful contact with her. Also in 2004, Matthiessen stirred controversy when he started a fundraising effort to assist three priests whom his successor bishop had removed from public ministry.

In 2009, Matthiessen was presented with the Teacher of Peace Award from Pax Christi USA. In his retirement, Matthiesen published three books:

- Wise and Otherwise: The Life and Times of a Cottonpicking Texas Bishop (2004)
- The Golden Years: The History of St. Laurence Cathedral in Amarillo (2005)
- Lieber Bernard und Elise: The Lives and Times of a German Texas Family (2009)

Leroy Matthiesen died on March 22, 2010, in Amarillo at age 88.
