= Diocese of Amarillo =

Latin Catholic jurisdiction in the US

Coordinates: 35°11′57″N 101°50′43″W

Diocese of Amarillo Dioecesis Amarillensis
- Coat of arms

Location
- Country: United States
- Territory: Panhandle of Texas
- Ecclesiastical province: Province of San Antonio

Statistics
- Area: 25,800 sq mi (67,000 km^{2})
- Population: Total; Catholics: (as of 2012); 427,927; 50,237 (11.7%)
- Parishes: 38

Information
- Denomination: Catholic
- Sui iuris church: Latin Church
- Rite: Roman Rite
- Established: August 3, 1926
- Cathedral: St. Mary's Cathedral
- Patron saint: Saint Lawrence

Current leadership
- Pope: Leo XIV
- Bishop: Sede vacante
- Metropolitan Archbishop: Gustavo Garcia-Siller
- Apostolic Administrator: Daniel DiNardo
- Bishops emeritus: John Yanta; Patrick Zurek

Map
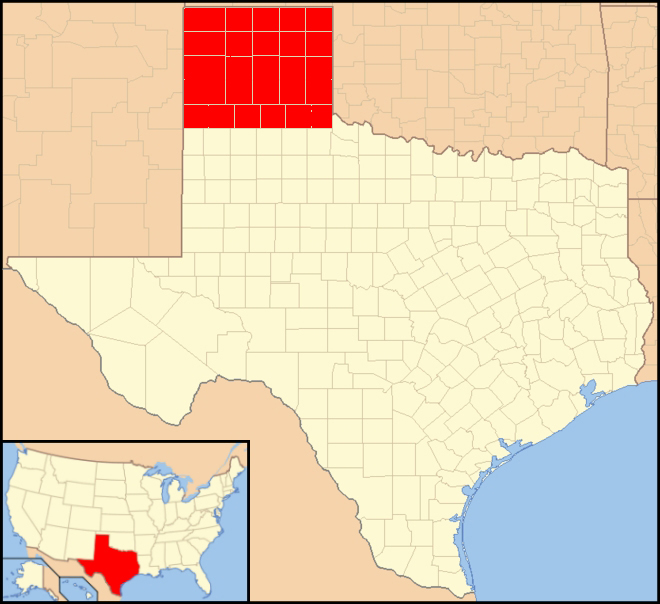

Website
- amarillodiocese.org

The Diocese of Amarillo (Latin: Dioecesis Amarillensis) is a diocese of the Catholic church in the Texas Panhandle region in the United States. It is a suffragan diocese of the metropolitan Archdiocese of San Antonio. The mother church is St. Mary's Cathedral in Amarillo. The diocese is currently without a bishop.

== Territory ==
The Diocese of Amarillo consists of the following 26 counties: Armstrong, Briscoe, Carson, Castro, Childress, Collingsworth, Dallam, Deaf Smith, Donley, Gray, Hall, Hansford, Hartley, Hemphill, Hutchinson, Lipscomb, Moore, Ochiltree, Oldham, Parmer, Potter, Randall, Roberts, Sherman, Swisher, and Wheeler.

== History ==
=== 1800 to 1926 ===
The Texas Panhandle was under several different Catholic jurisdictions before the creation of the Diocese of Amarillo:

- Prefecture Apostolic of Texas (1841 to 1847)
- Vicariate Apostolic of Texas (1847 to 1874)
- Diocese of Galveston (1874 to 1914)
- Dioceses of Dallas and San Antonio (1914 to 1926)

The first Catholic priests in the Panhandle came from Kansas and New Mexico during the 1870s, serving the small Catholic population in periodic visits. The first Catholic church in the Panhandle was St. Mary's, dedicated in Clarendon in 1892, to serve Irish and German railroad workers. In 1903, construction started on St. Mary's, the first Catholic church in Amarillo.

=== 1903 to 1941 ===
Pope Pius XI founded the Diocese of Amarillo on August 3, 1926, taking its territory from the Dioceses of Dallas and San Antonio. The new diocese contained large areas of northern Texas. The pope named Rudolph Gerken of Dallas as the first bishop of Amarillo. During his tenure in Amarillo, Gerken oversaw the construction of thirty-five churches. He also founded Price Memorial College, a secondary school in Amarillo, and served as its first president. In 1933, Gerken became archbishop of the Archdiocese of Santa Fe.

The second bishop of Amarillo was Robert Lucey of the Diocese of Los Angeles, named by Pius XI in 1934. He established the Texas Panhandle Register as the diocesan newspaper. Lucey was elevated to archbishop of San Antonio in 1941. That same year, Pope Pius XII appointed Monsignor Laurence FitzSimon of San Antonio as the next bishop of Amarillo.

=== 1941 to 1980 ===
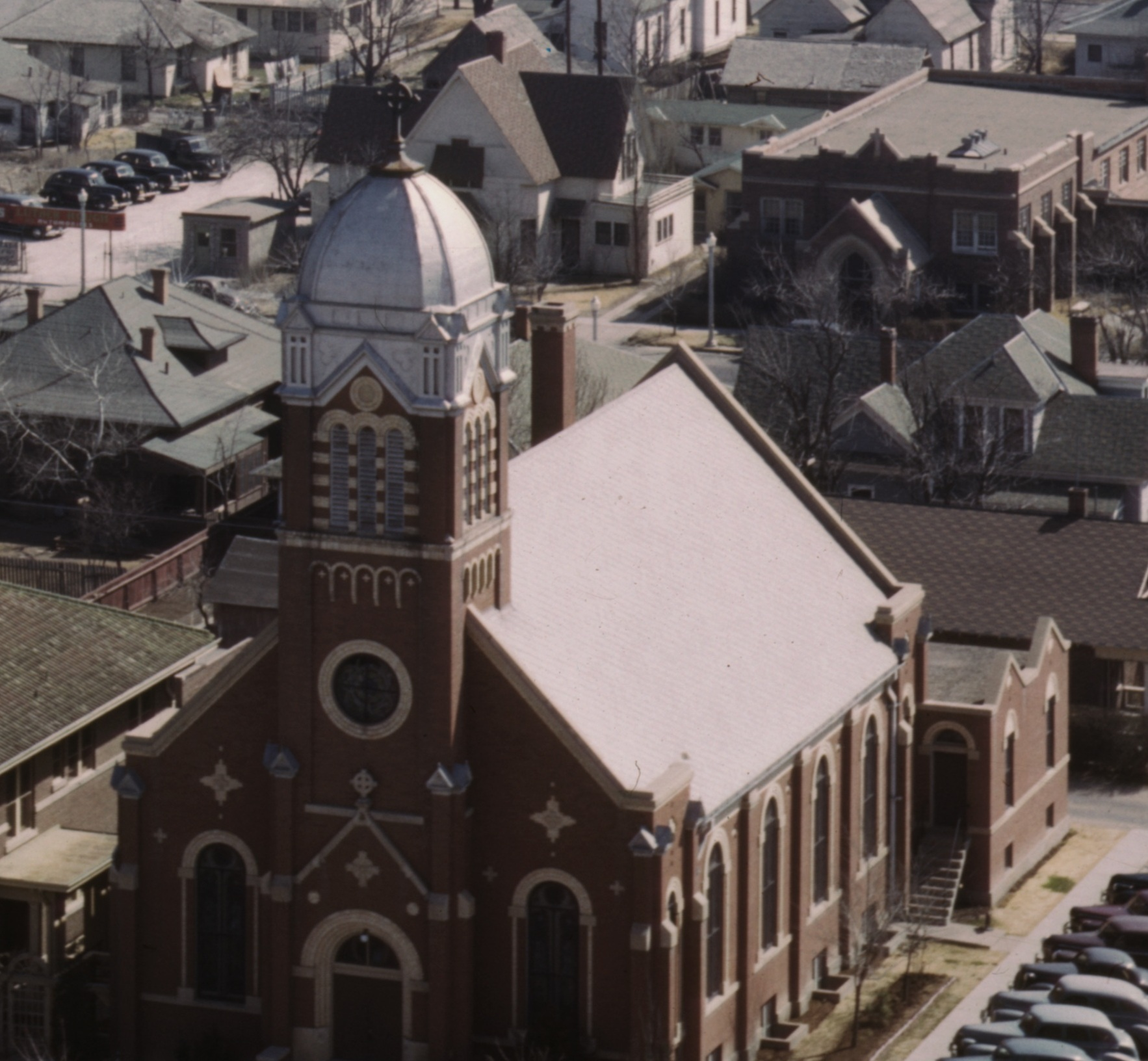
Sacred Heart Church, Amarillo, Texas (1943). Cathedral from 1927 to 1975

During Fitzsimon's 17-year-long tenure as bishop, the number of churches, priests, schools, and institutions in the diocese more than doubled. In September 1945, after the end of World War II, FitzSimon wrote a letter to US Congressman Francis E. Worley protesting the conditions at the Italian prisoner of war camp in Hereford, Texas. FitzSimon had visited the camp in July 1945 and saw that prisoners were receiving low rations of substandard quality. They also told him stories of beatings and other mistreatment by guards. Fitzsimon died in 1958.

Auxiliary Bishop John Morkovsky was the next bishop of Amarillo, named by Pius XII in 1958. The Vatican in 1961 erected the Diocese of San Angelo, taking 21 counties from the Diocese of Amarillo. Morkovsky became coadjutor bishop of the Diocese of Galveston-Houston in 1963. Pope John XXIII in 1963 named Monsignor Lawrence De Falco of the Diocese of Fort Worth as the fifth bishop of Amarillo.

During his 16-year-long tenure, De Falco worked to implement the Second Vatican Council reforms, establishing pastoral councils and senates of priests, nuns, and permanent deacons. He also reduced diocesan debt, but was forced to close several schools and hospitals. St. Laurence Church in Amarillo replaced Sacred Heart as the diocesan cathedral in 1975. De Falco retired as bishop of Amarillo due to poor health in 1979.

=== 1980 to present ===
In 1980, Pope John Paul II appointed Leroy Matthiesen of Amarillo as bishop of that diocese. In 1981, in protest of the assembly of the neutron bomb at a facility in Pantex, Matthiesen called for workers there to resign their jobs in protest. None were reported to have obeyed his call.

The Vatican in 1983 erected the Diocese of Lubbock, taking 23 counties from the southern part of the Diocese of Amarillo. Matthiesen retired in 1997. That same year, Auxiliary Bishop John Yanta of San Antonio succeeded him. Yanta retired in 2008; later that year, Patrick Zurek succeeded him.

In 2016, Zurek announced an investigation of Frank Pavone, a diocesan priest. Pavone had place an aborted fetus on the altar in his church, then posted a video of it on social media. Pavone frequently expressed support for President Donald Trump during his 2020 election campaign, despite orders from Zurek to stop. The Vatican laicized Pavone in 2022.

In March 2022, the diocese was sued over a salmonella outbreak at a church dinner. Over 100 participants at St. Joseph's Church were sickened by contaminated enchiladas, with one person dying and others requiring hospital treatment.

Tony Neusch, rector of St. Mary's Cathedral, was pepper-sprayed at the cathedral in 2024 by an individual while Neusch was hearing confessions. The man was arrested. Neusch, who was not injured, later said that the individual was mentally ill. Zurek retired as bishop of Amarillo in February 2026. Pope Leo XVI named Cardinal Daniel DiNardo as apostolic administrator of Amarillo.

=== Sex abuse ===
During his tenure as bishop, Bishop Matthiesen admitted eight priests into the Diocese of Amarillo after they had undergone treatment following accusations of sexual impropriety. The most controversial individuals were John Salazar and Ed Graff. Salazar in 1987 went to prison in California for abusing two teenage boys in the Archdiocese of Los Angeles. Archbishop Roger Mahony of Los Angeles had notified the Vatican. Graff was dismissed from the Diocese of Allentown due to accusations of sexual abuse. After Matthiesen accepted Graff into the Diocese of Amarillo, Bishop Thomas Welsh of Allentown expressed his concern that Matthiesen never consulted him about the transfer.

By September 2002, eight priests had resigned from the diocese due to sexual abuse allegations. In 2003, the diocese settled the lawsuit for the woman impregnated by Herrera, providing approximately $27,000 for the child. In November 2004, the diocese settled a second lawsuit for $50,000. The female plaintiff had claimed that Herrera engaged in wrongful contact with her.

In 2004, Matthiessen stirred controversy when he started a private fundraising effort for three priests whom he had removed from public ministry. In January 2019, the diocese released a list of 30 clergy with credible allegations of sexual abuse.

== Bishops ==
=== Bishops of Amarillo ===
1. Rudolph Gerken (1926–1933), appointed Archbishop of Santa Fe
2. Robert Emmet Lucey (1934–1941), appointed Archbishop of San Antonio
3. Laurence Julius FitzSimon (1941–1958)
4. John Louis Morkovsky (1958–1963), appointed Bishop of Galveston-Houston
5. Lawrence Michael De Falco (1963–1979)
6. Leroy Theodore Matthiesen (1980–1997)
7. John Walter Yanta (1997–2008)
8. Patrick Zurek (2008–2026)

=== Other diocesan priest who became a bishop ===
Thomas Joseph Drury, appointed Bishop of San Angelo in 1961 and later Bishop of Corpus Christi.

== Education ==
As of 2025, the Diocese of Amarillo had one high school, Holy Cross Catholic Academy in Amarillo, along with four elementary schools and one pre-school.

== Former cathedrals ==
- Sacred Heart Cathedral, Amarillo 1927–1975
- St. Laurence Catholic Church, Amarillo 1975–2011
