= Pantex =

U.S. nuclear weapons assembly facility

Coordinates: 35°18′42″N 101°33′35″W

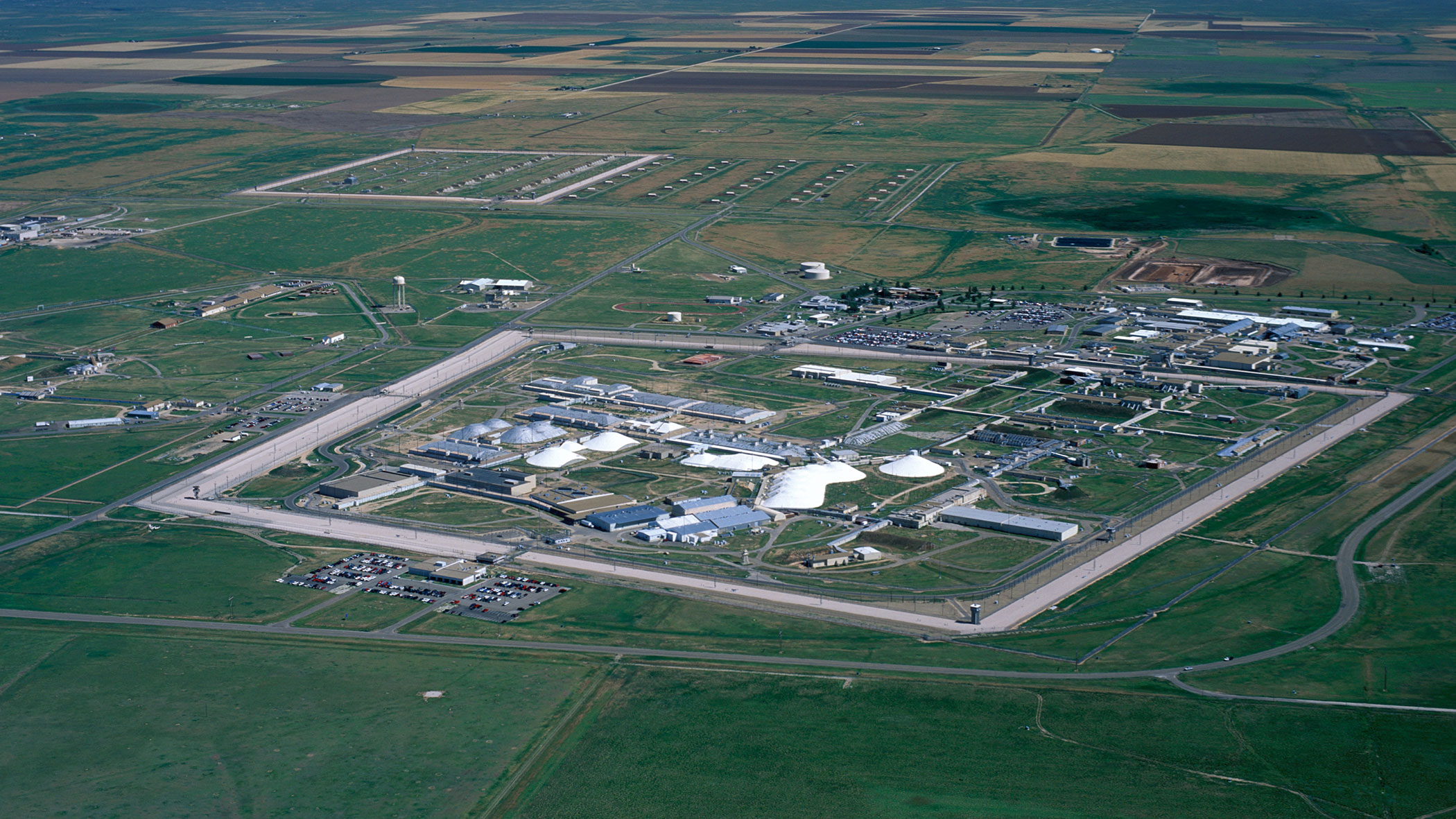
Pantex plant

Pantex is the primary United States nuclear weapons assembly and disassembly facility that aims to maintain the safety, security and reliability of the U.S. nuclear weapons stockpile. The facility is named for its location in the Panhandle of Texas on a 16,000-acre (25 sq mi; 65 km^{2}) site 20 miles (32 km) northeast of Amarillo, in Carson County, Texas. The plant is managed and operated for the United States Department of Energy (DOE) by PanTeXas Deterrence, LLC (PXD). PXD is a joint venture led by BWX Technologies and includes Fluor Corporation and The Texas A&M University System. As a major national security site, the plant and its grounds are strictly controlled, and the airspace above and around the plant is prohibited to civilian air traffic by the FAA as Prohibited Area P-47.

== History ==
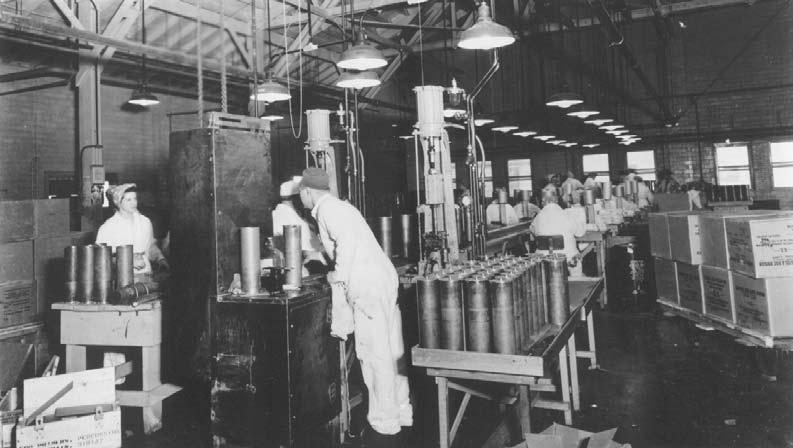
Conventional weapons being assembled at Pantex in 1944

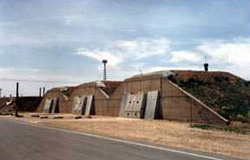
Bunkers at Pantex used for temporary staging of nuclear weapons

The Pantex plant was originally constructed as a conventional bomb plant for the United States Army Air Force during the early days of World War II. The Pantex Ordnance Plant was authorized February 24, 1942. Construction was completed on November 15, and workers from all over the U.S. flocked to Amarillo for jobs.

Pantex was abruptly deactivated when the war ended and remained vacant until 1949, when Texas Technological College in Lubbock (now Texas Tech University) purchased the site for $1. Texas Tech used the land for experimental cattle-feeding operations.

In 1951, at the request of the Atomic Energy Commission (now the National Nuclear Security Administration), the Army exercised a recapture clause in the sale contract and reclaimed the main plant and 10,000 acres (40 km^{2}) of surrounding land for use as a nuclear weapons production facility. The Atomic Energy Commission refurbished and expanded the plant at a cost of $25 million. The remaining 6,000 acres (24 km^{2}) of the original site were leased from Texas Tech in 1989.

Pantex was operated by Procter & Gamble from 1951 to 1956, Mason & Hanger from 1956 to 2001, and Babcock & Wilcox from 2001 to 2014. In 2010, the plant employed about 3,600 people and had a budget of $600 million. In 2024, Pantex became the Texas panhandle's largest employer when the employee count grew to 4,626. This growth was necessary to match the plant's more than 70% increase in workload.

== Health and environmental concerns ==
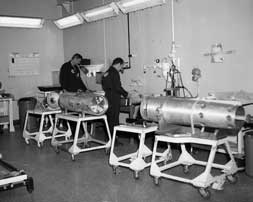
Technicians perform final assembly on a nuclear warhead, c. 1985

There has been perennial interest in whether conditions at the plant have led to health problems in its workers or the surrounding communities. In 1998, the Agency for Toxic Substances and Disease Registry documented a statistically significant incidence of increased cancer rates and low birth weights in some of the counties surrounding Pantex, but the counties closest to the plant (Armstrong and Carson) had no significant increase in cancer rates. The agency concluded that the plant was not likely to be associated with these findings. A 2005 National Institute for Occupational Safety and Health study of cancer rates among Pantex workers over the timespan 1951–1995 found that they had a statistically significant increase in occurrence of prostate cancer and multiple myeloma with length of employment, leading the authors to recommend follow-up research to investigate whether the working conditions of those employees was the cause. In 2013, the Amarillo Globe-News reported that some Pantex employees had been awarded financial compensation by the U.S. government after developing health problems that may have been related to depleted uranium or thorium exposure.

In 1994, the Environmental Protection Agency (EPA) listed the plant as a Superfund site, having found toxic chemicals, including radionuclides, in over a hundred places in its soil and groundwater. This was the result of improper waste management practices for the materials in question, like storing wastewater in unlined ponds, burying waste in unlined landfills, and burning waste in the open. To help control the spread of hazardous material in the site's soil and groundwater, the EPA implemented remediation techniques including soil vapor extraction, groundwater extraction and treatment, in situ bioremediation, and the installation of protective liners in former waste disposal trenches. Additionally, institutional practices were changed at the plant. The EPA oversaw a cleanup that they said made the site safe in the short term as of 2009, although their long-term cleanup of the site's perched groundwater is ongoing as of 2026.

== Public opposition ==
In the early 1980s, after President Ronald Reagan announced a plan to build a neutron bomb, local Catholic Bishop Leroy Matthiesen tried persuading workers at the plant to leave their jobs. None did, and some Catholic and political leaders in the area objected to the bishop's appeal.

In 1986 activists from the Red River Peace Network purchased 20 acres (81,000 m^{2}) adjacent to Pantex to create the "Peace Farm", described as "a visible witness against weapons of mass destruction." Its staff and board organized events, rallies, and gatherings opposing nuclear weapons through the 1990s and now organizes events related to the environment, nuclear nonproliferation and waste disposal, and peace issues.

== Labor troubles ==
Labor troubles arose in 2007 following the implementation of stricter physical and performance requirements for armed security personnel following the September 11th attacks. The workers' union for the Pantex guards protested that the new standards were unfairly strenuous to middle-aged personnel nearing retirement. In protest 500 guards walked off the job and went on strike in April and were replaced with a temporary guard force. The strike ended with a negotiated settlement after 34 days. Guards also went on strike in a pay dispute in 1981, and unionized production and maintenance workers struck in 1970 and 2015.

== Safety incidents ==
- In 1977, three men were killed in an explosion while machining LX-09, a plastic explosive.
- In 2004, workers taped together broken sections of highly explosive material being extracted from the plutonium trigger of a W56 warhead. The Defense Nuclear Facilities Safety Board asserted that this unsanctioned handling of unstable explosive could have set off a "violent reaction" with "potentially unacceptable consequences". It is not clear if the taped explosive had been separated from the plutonium trigger or "pit" at the time of the incident. If the explosive was still connected to the trigger, it could have caused injury or death of plant workers, as well as widespread dispersal of radioactive material.
- In 2005, the Project on Government Oversight (POGO) claimed that Pantex workers could have caused a nuclear explosion when they improperly applied too much pressure on an obsolete W56 warhead while dismantling it. Unidentified experts knowledgeable about the event told POGO of the danger. The DOE fined the contractor running the plant at the time, BWXT, $110,000 for incidents involving the bomb but did not mention any possibility of an explosion or identify the warhead.
