= Holy Cross Catholic Academy (Amarillo, Texas) =

American private coeducational school

Location
- 4110 South Bonham Street; Amarillo, (Randall County), Texas 79110; United States; 35°10′15″N 101°51′36″W

Information
- Type: Private, Coeducational
- Religious affiliation: Roman Catholic
- Patron saint: St. Michael
- Established: 1928
- Superintendent: Christine Wanjura
- Head of school: Craig Logan
- Teaching staff: 13.8 (on an FTE basis)
- Grades: 6–12
- Student to teacher ratio: 7.8
- Colors: Red and Black
- Sports: Football, Volleyball, Boys/Girls Basketball, Boys/Girls Track, Boys/Girls Golf
- Mascot: Mustang
- Communities served: Diocese of Amarillo
- Website: holycrossama.org

Holy Cross Catholic Academy is a private, Roman Catholic high school in Amarillo, Texas. It is the only Catholic high school in the Roman Catholic Diocese of Amarillo.

== History ==
Catholic secondary education in Amarillo can be traced back to 1913 when St. Mary's Academy was moved to Amarillo, TX. St. Mary's Academy was coeducational for grades 1–6; however, the high school was only for young ladies. It was not until 1928 that an all-boys school was created. St. George's College began in the basement of Amarillo's Sacred Heart Cathedral. In 1929 the school was renamed Price Memorial College, in honor of Katherine E. Price's donation to help construct a permanent building for the school. The Christian Brothers staffed the school from 1936 to 1966. From 1966 to 1967 the school merged with St. Mary's Academy and became Alamo Catholic High School, a coeducational middle and high school. Mounting maintenance problems forced Alamo to move to the west wing of St. Joseph Catholic School in 1990. It was renamed Holy Cross Catholic Academy in 2000 after a complete renovation of the school.

== Athletics ==
Holy Cross competes in cross country running, cheerleading, volleyball, basketball, track and field, and golf.

== Debate ==
Holy Cross Catholic Academy Debate team regularly competes in the following events: Lincoln-Douglas Debate, Public Forum Debate, Extemporaneous Speaking, Impromptu Speaking, Original Oratory, Prose and Poetry Interpretation, and Interpretation events.
