= Patrick Zurek =

American Catholic prelate

His Excellency, The Most Reverend Patrick Zurek
- Bishop Emeritus of Amarillo
- Diocese: Amarillo
- Appointed: January 3, 2008
- Installed: February 22, 2008
- Retired: February 14, 2026
- Predecessor: John Walter Yanta
- Previous posts: Auxiliary Bishop of San Antonio & Titular Bishop of Thamugadi (1998-2008)

Orders
- Ordination: June 29, 1975 by Pope Paul VI
- Consecration: February 16, 1998 by Patrick Flores, John E. McCarthy, and Edmond Carmody

Personal details
- Born: August 17, 1948 (age 77) Sealy, Texas, US
- Education: University of St. Thomas; St. Mary's Seminary; Pontifical University of Saint Thomas Aquinas
- Motto: Secundum cor Tuum (Latin for 'Like Your heart')

Styles of Patrick Zurek
- Reference style: His Excellency; The Most Reverend
- Spoken style: Your Excellency
- Religious style: Bishop

Patrick James Zurek (born 17 August 1948) is an American Catholic prelate who served as Bishop of Amarillo in Texas from 2008 until 2026. He previously served as an auxiliary bishop of the Archdiocese of San Antonio in Texas from 1998 to 2008.

== Biography ==
=== Early life ===
Patrick Zurek was born on August 17, 1948, in Sealy, Texas, to Arnold and Victoria (Bohac) Zurek. His siblings were Lawrence Zurek and Dennis Zurek. Patrick Zurek attended the University of St. Thomas in Houston, where he received a Bachelor of Science degree in mathematics, magna cum laude. He then attended St. Mary's Seminary in Houston, where he obtained a Bachelor of Sacred Theology degree in 1974.

=== Priesthood ===
Zurek was ordained a priest for the Diocese of Austin in Rome in St. Peter's Square in Vatican City on June 29, 1975, by Pope Paul VI. He obtained his Licentiate in Moral Theology in 1976 at the Pontifical University of Saint Thomas Aquinas in Rome. Zurek also worked as a chaplain at the Bambino Gesù Hospital in Rome during his seminary days.

After his return to Texas in 1976, Zurek held several pastoral assignments in Texas parishes:

- Associate pastor at St. Mary's in Temple (1976 to 1979)
- Associate pastor at St. Joseph's in Bryan (1979 to 1982)
- Pastor at St. Thomas Aquinas in College Station (1982 to 1992)
- Pastor of St. John Neumann in Austin, Texas (1992 to 1998)

Zurek served on the board of the directors of missions, the Assumption Seminary, and the Ad Hoc Committee for the Spanish-language Bible. He also led the National Conference of Diocesan Vocation Directors.

=== Auxiliary Bishop of San Antonio ===
On January 5, 1998, Zurek was appointed as an auxiliary bishop of the Archdiocese of San Antonio and titular bishop of Thamugadi by Pope John Paul II. Zurek was consecrated by Archbishop Patrick F. Flores on February 16, 1998, at the San Antonio Municipal Auditorium in San Antonio.

As bishop, Zurek participated in numerous charity events, including one for 13 area Catholic schools that raised $230,000. He has also appeared on television con-celebrating mass between the Archdiocese of San Antonio and the Archdiocese of Tegucigalpa in Honduras.

=== Bishop of Amarillo ===
On January 3, 2008, Pope Benedict XVI appointed Zurek as bishop of the Diocese of Amarillo, replacing Bishop John Yanta. Zurek was installed on February 22, 2008. Zurek speaks five languages, including Czech, Italian, and Spanish. On January 31, 2019, the diocese released a list of 30 clergy with credible allegations of sexual abuse. Zurek made this statement.

The Diocese of Amarillo seeks to express regret and apologizes for the failing and sins that have hurt the Church so deeply, especially in our most vulnerable members. The Diocese especially asks forgiveness for the failings of those who have held positions of leadership in the Church.

On February 14, 2026, Pope Leo XIV accepted his resignation after reaching the retirement age of 75.

== See also ==
- Catholic Church hierarchy
- Catholic Church in the United States
- Historical list of the Catholic bishops of the United States
- List of Catholic bishops of the United States
- Lists of patriarchs, archbishops, and bishops

== Episcopal succession ==
Catholic Church titles
Preceded by John Walter Yanta	Bishop of Amarillo; 22 February 2008–14 February 2026	Succeeded by Sede Vacante
Preceded by -	Auxiliary Bishop of San Antonio; 1998-2008	Succeeded by -
