= Cathedral of San Fernando (San Antonio) =

Catholic cathedral in Texas, United States

San Fernando Cathedral
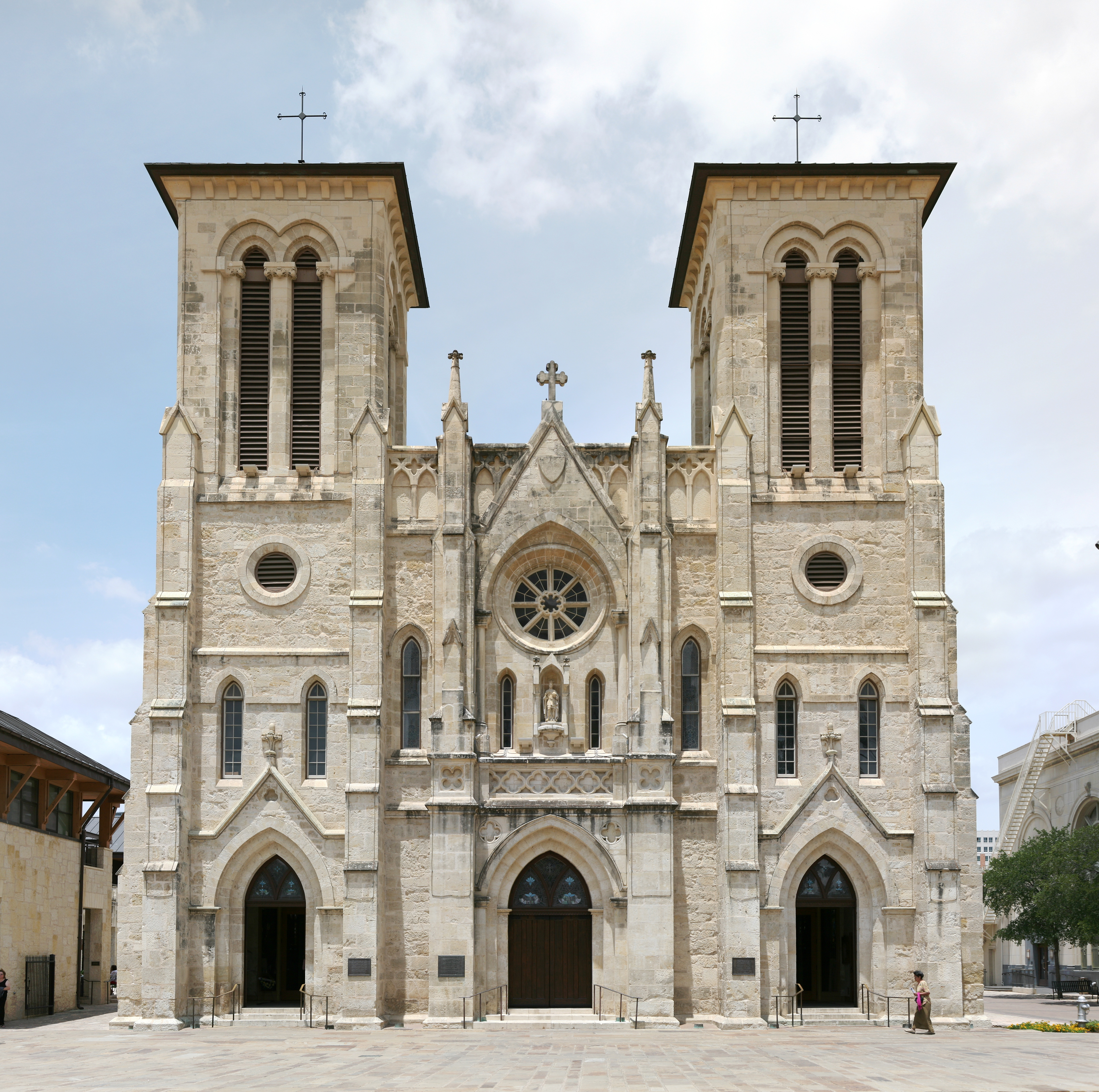
- San Fernando Cathedral is one of the oldest active cathedrals in the United States.

- 29°25′28.0″N 98°29′38.4″W
- Location: San Antonio, Texas, U.S.
- Denomination: Catholic Church
- Tradition: Latin Church
- Website: San Fernando Cathedral – San Antonio Texas

History
- Status: Cathedral
- Dedication: Saint Ferdinand

Architecture
- Architect(s): Francois P. Giraud; Dielman, Leo
- Architectural type: Colonial, Gothic Revival
- Groundbreaking: 1738
- Completed: 1868?

Administration
- Province: Ecclesiastical province of San Antonio
- Archdiocese: Archdiocese of San Antonio

Clergy
- Archbishop: Archbishop Gustavo García-Siller
- Rector: Very Rev. Fr. Carlos B. Velázquez
Designations
U.S. National Register of Historic Places
- Official name: Church of Nuestra Senora de la Candelaria y Guadalupe
- Designated: February 25, 1975
- Reference no.: 75001949
- Governing Body: Private

San Fernando Cathedral (Spanish: Catedral de San Fernando) also called the Cathedral of Our Lady of Candelaria and Guadalupe (Spanish: Catedral de Nuestra Señora de la Candelaria y Guadalupe) is a cathedral of the Catholic Church located in San Antonio, Texas, in the United States. It is the mother church of the Archdiocese of San Antonio and the seat of its archbishop. Its dome serves as the city of San Antonio's cultural and geographical center.

The cathedral is also known as the Church of Nuestra Señora de la Candelaria y Guadalupe and is listed on the National Register of Historic Places. It is notable as one of the oldest cathedrals in the United States.

== History ==
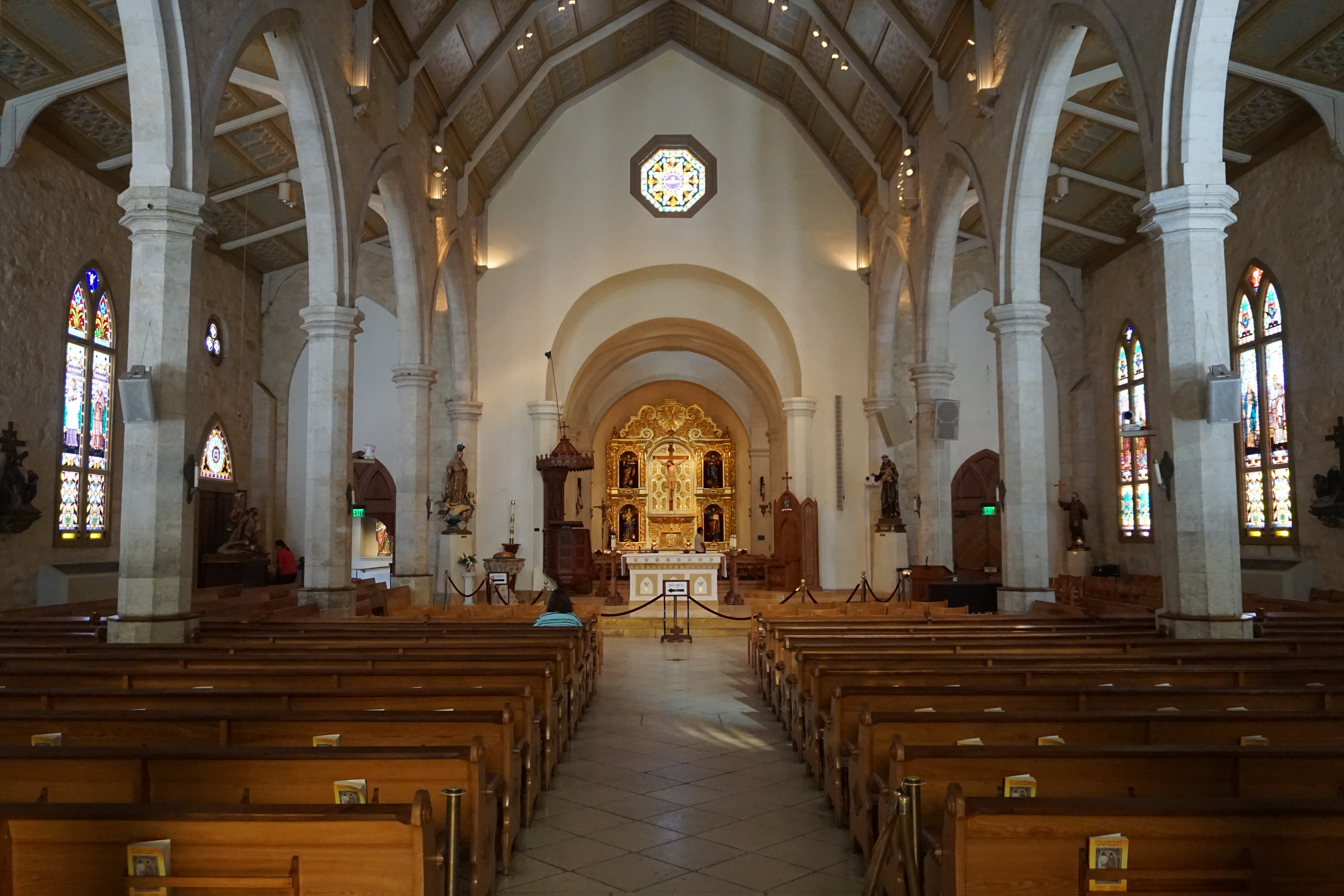
Nave, Cathedral of San Fernando (2017)

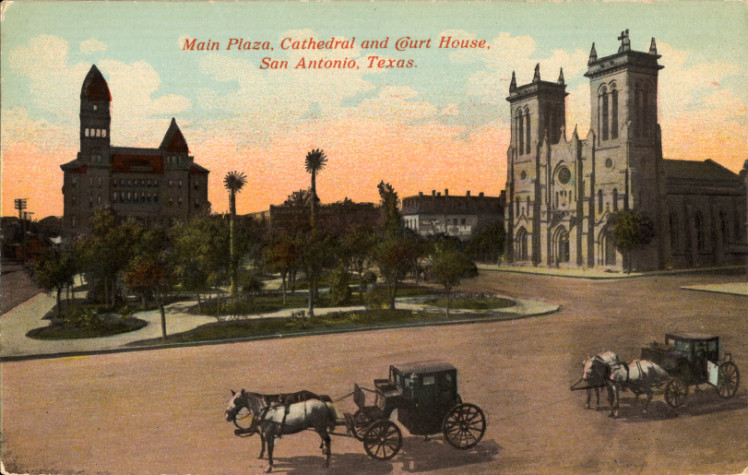
Main plaza, Cathedral of San Fernando (c. 1901–1914)

=== 1700 to 1800 ===
During the 17th century, present-day San Antonio was part of a province of the Spanish Empire. The Catholics in the region were under the jurisdiction of the Archdiocese of Mexico. In 1731, the Spanish Crown sent 55 settlers from the Canary Islands, another Spanish province, to live in the presidio, or fort, of San Antonio. Juan Antonio Pérez de Almazán, the military commander, was directed to find a site for building a church for them. The cornerstone for San Fernando Church was laid on May 11, 1738. It was named for Ferdinand III of Castile, who ruled parts of present-day Spain in the 13th century. The church was being built by soldiers from the presidio, their families and the newly arrived settlers. However, their inexperienced efforts led to poor results.

In 1748, the viceroy donated 12,000 pesos to jump-start the project, allowing church officials to bring in a master stone mason and a stone cutter from Mexico. Clearing away the existing work, the men expanded the church footprint. San Fernando Church was finally dedicated in 1755. During the late 18th century, Charles III is believed to have donated the baptismal font, to the church.

=== 1800 to 1874 ===
By the beginning of the 19th century, San Fernando Church had approximately 1,000 parishioners. In 1819, the church was damaged by a flood of the San Antonio River. After the Mexican War of Independence ended in 1821, present-day Texas passed to Mexico from Spain. When the Mexican government started limiting the Catholic missions in its territory, San Fernando Church received vessels, mission records, and parishioners from nearby missions. The church was significantly damaged by a fire in 1828. In 1831, after the church repairs were completed, James Bowie, a soldier and slave trader, married Ursula de Veramendi there.

San Fernando Church played a role in the Texas Revolution. During the Battle of Bexar in late 1835, Mexican forces stationed artillery pieces at the church. At the start of Battle of the Alamo in San Antonio in February 1836, Mexican General Antonio López de Santa Anna hoisted a flag of "no quarter" from the church tower. The siege ended in March 1836 when Santa Anna took control of the Alamo, killing all the defenders, including Bowie.

After the war ended in 1836, most of Texas, including San Antonio, became part of the Texas Republic. Three years later, the Vatican ended the jurisdiction of the Mexican church over the area, creating the Prefecture Apostolic of Texas. By now the San Fernando Church was suffering from the aftereffects of the war; its roof caved in 1840 and birds were nesting in the building.In 1847, the Vatican placed this area of Texas, now part of the United States, under the new Diocese of Galveston.

As the population increased in the San Antonio area, the need to repair and renovate San Fernando Church increased. In 1868, under the direction of architect Francois P. Giraud, part of the nave and the bell tower were razed. The church was rebuilt with a gable roof and twin bell towers and buttresses. The builders also installed three entrances to a Gothic Revival nave. The only part of the original church that was saved was the sanctuary. The San Fernando Church was consecrated in 1873.

=== 1874 to 2000 ===
In August 1874, Pope Pius IX erected the Diocese of San Antonio and designated San Fernando Church as its new cathedral. That same year, the Cathedral of San Fernando received its carved stone stations of the cross.

The stained glass windows were added to the cathedral in 1920. In 1936, Pope Pius XI elevated the Diocese of San Antonio to the Archdiocese of San Antonio. During the 1970s, it underwent a major renovation. In 1987, Pope John Paul II visited the cathedral during his papal visit to Texas. A marker commemorates the event.

=== 2000 to 2010 ===
In 2003, the archdiocese commenced a $15 million renovation project at the cathedral. It was supervised by Richard S. Vosko, a liturgical design consultant. The project had three phases:

- Phase One – restoration and stabilization of the cathedral foundation and structure, and changes to interior organization for liturgical purposes. The contractors moved the altar out of the sanctuary and closer to the center of the nave. They relocated the baptismal font from the back of the church into the main aisle.
- Phase Two – replacement of the rectory with a new Cathedral Centre, housing a small cafeteria, counseling rooms, museum, gift shop, reception room, television control room, and vesting sacristy.
- Phase Three – construction of a community center to house community and social services, meeting rooms, a hall, church offices, and a residence for the priests.

In February 2006, the cathedral began a year-long celebration recognizing San Antonio's 275th Anniversary.

=== 2011 to present ===
In 2011, Archbishop Gustavo García-Siller decided to change some of the elements of the 2003 renovation. He Installed a new altar permanently affixed to the floor in the sanctuary, with a railing behind the altar to limit access there. Contractors also added a cathedra and relocated the baptismal font to the front of the nave next to the lectern. Parishioners and outside donors contributed $150,000 to the project. As part of the dedication, García-Siller placed three relics in the altar. Two were relics of St. Anthony of Padua, a doctor of the church The third relic was of Blessed Concepción Cabrera de Armida, a Mexican writer and mystic.

In 2014, Main Plaza Conservancy inaugurated San Antonio: The Saga, a video art projection by artist Xavier de Richemont. The 24-minute show is projected on the façade of San Fernando Cathedral, with viewers watching it from the Main Plaza. It depicts events in the history of San Antonio and the State of Texas.

Over 5,000 participate at weekend masses each week. Over 900 baptisms, 100 weddings, 100 funerals, and countless other services and special events are performed each year. The Good Friday Passion Play attracts thousands of visitors.

Gallery
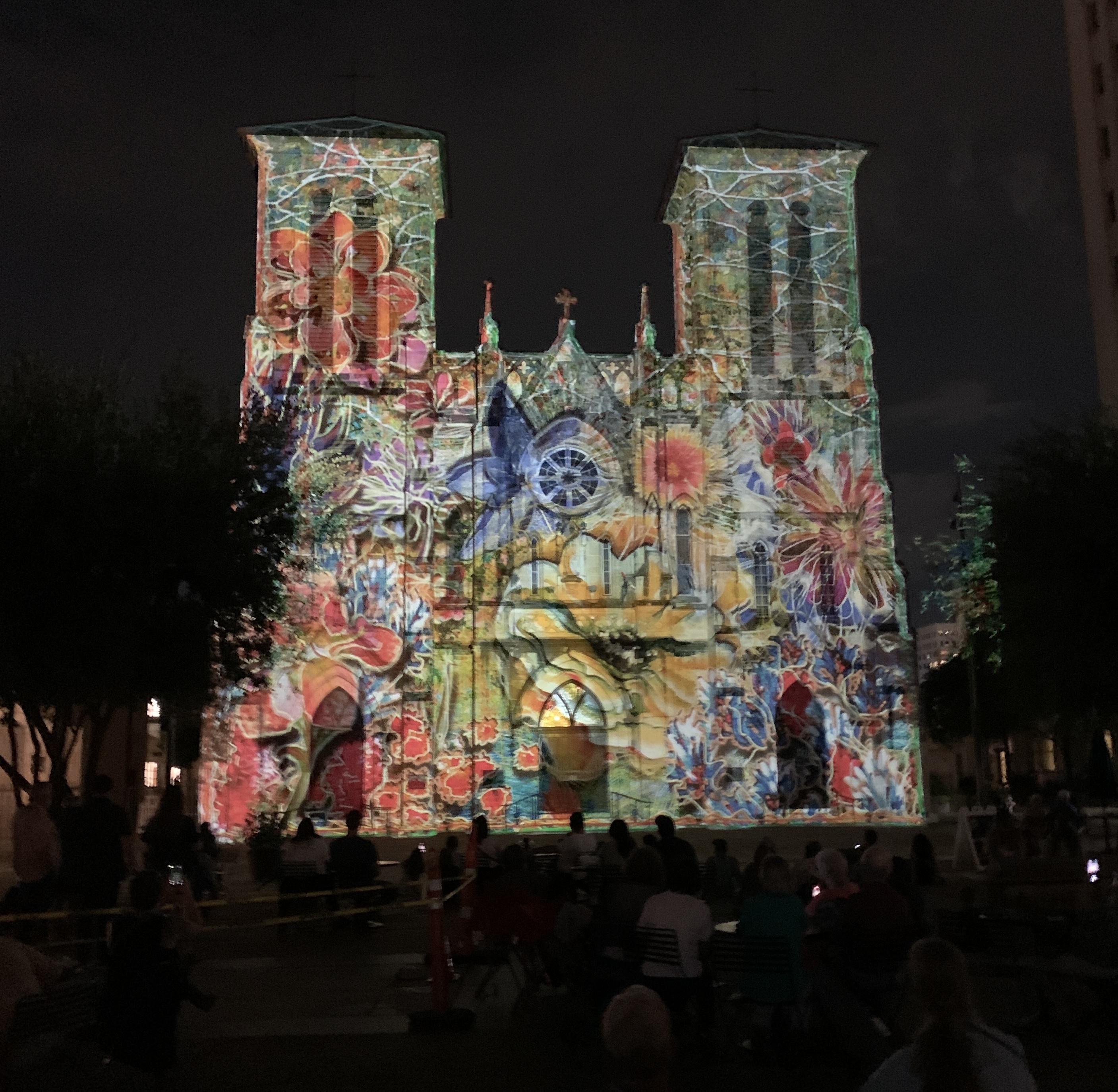
San Antonio: The Saga Show

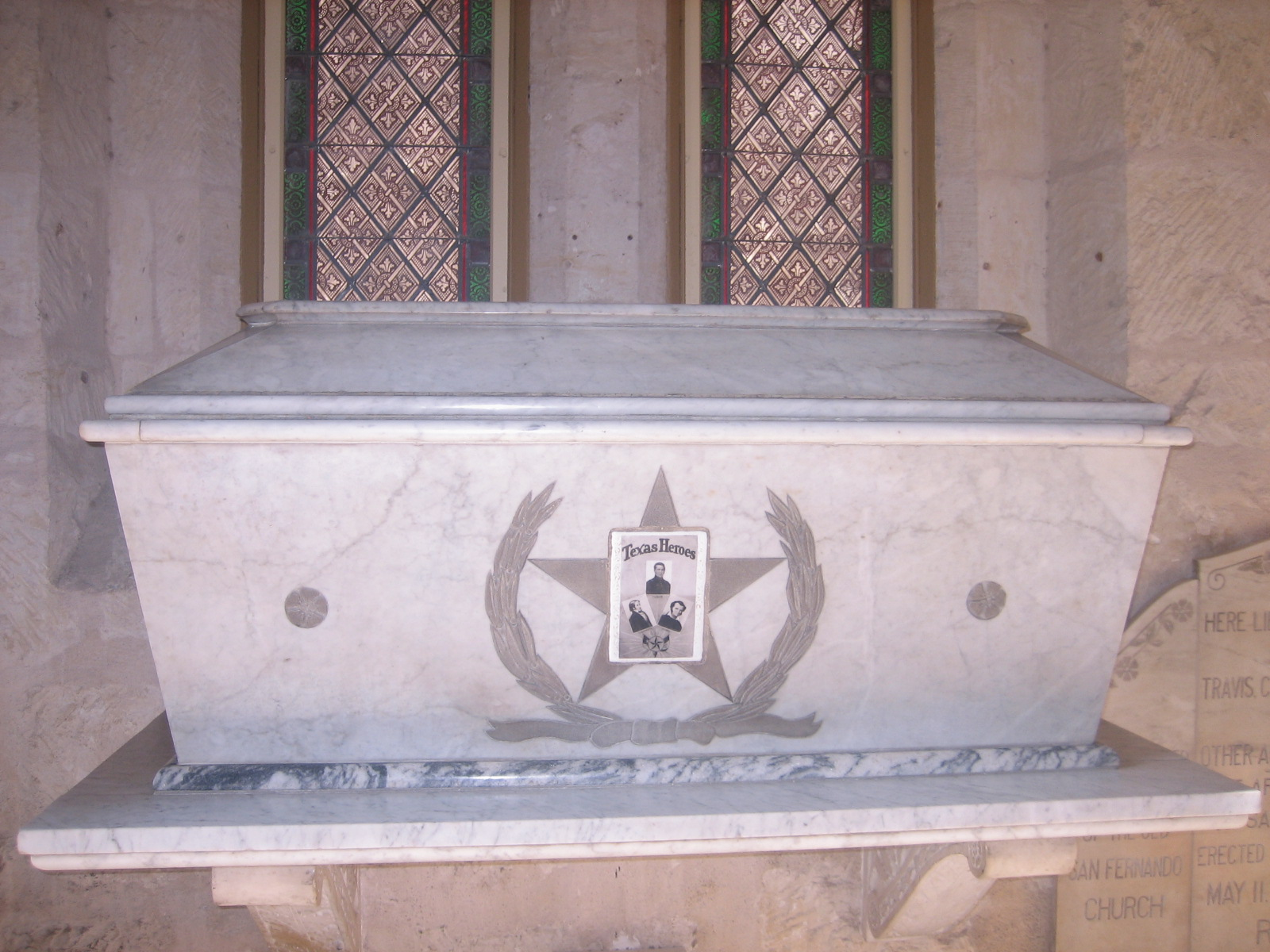
Tomb possibly containing remains of men killed in the Battle of the Alamo

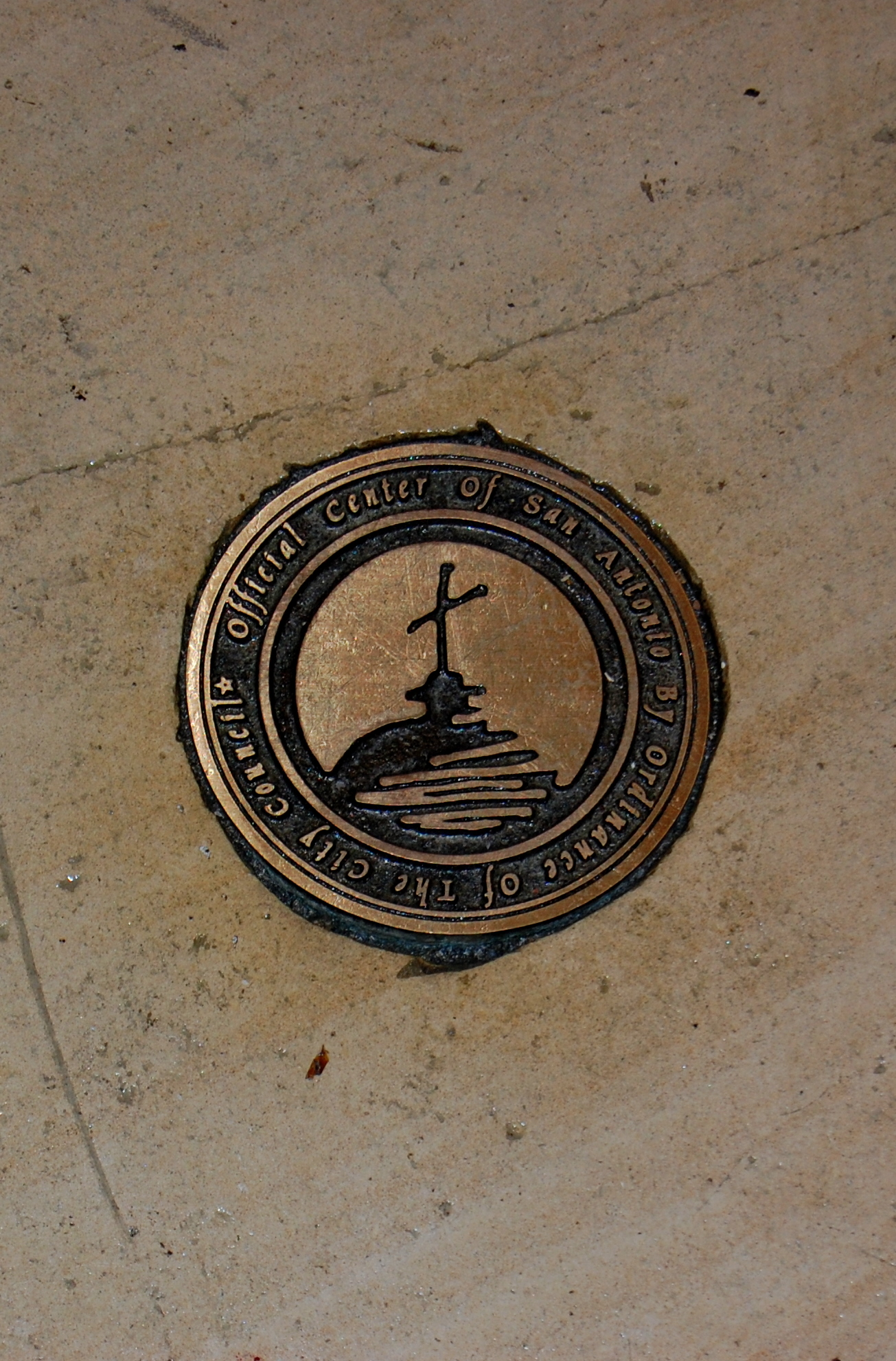
Marker for official center of City of San Antonio marker, inside the cathedral

== See also ==
- List of Catholic cathedrals in the United States
- List of cathedrals in the United States
- San Antonio Missions National Historical Park
- Alamo Mission in San Antonio
- Alamo Plaza Historic District
- Main and Military Plazas Historic District
- List of the oldest churches in the United States
