= List of parishes in the Diocese of Tucson =

This is a list of the Catholic parishes in the Diocese of Tucson in Southern Arizona in the United States.

== Parishes ==
=== Cochise County ===
Name	Image	Location	Description/notes
Catholic Community of Douglas and Pirtleville		Immaculate Conception Church, 928 C Ave, Douglas	Now part of the Catholic Community
		St. Luke Church, 1211 E. 15th St, Douglas	Now part of the Catholic Community
		St Bernard Church, 2308 N. Mc Kinley St, Pirtleville	Now part of the Catholic Community
Our Lady of Lourdes		386 E. 5th St, Benson	Founded in 1894, current church dedicated in 1949
Our Lady of the Mountains		1425 E. Yaqui St, Sierra Vista	Current church dedicated in 1991
Sacred Heart of Jesus		592 Safford St., Tombstone	Founded in 1881, current church dedicated in 1947
Sacred Heart of Jesus		215 W.2q Maley St, Willcox	
St Andrew the Apostle		800 Taylor Dr, Sierra Vista	Founded in 1958
		Good Shepherd Mission, Whetstone	Chapel dedicated in 1992. Supervised by St. Andrew the Apostle Parish
St Jude Thaddeus		Highway 191 Mile Post #50, Cochise	
		St. Francis Mission, 4110 Jefferson St, Elfrida	Supervised by St. Jude Thaddeus Parish
St Patrick		100 Quality Hill Rd, Bisbee	Founded in the 1880s, current church dedicated in 1918
		St. Michael Mission, 2090 W. Martinez St, Naco	Church dedicated in 1939. Supervised by St. Patrick Parish

=== Gila County ===
Name	Image	Location	Description/notes
Holy Angels		201 S. Broad St, Globe	Current church dedicated in 1918
Our Lady of the Blessed Sacrament		844 Sullivan St, Miami	Current church dedicated in 1917
St Joseph		300 Mountain View Dr, Hayden	
St Philip the Apostle Parish		511 S. St Phillips St, Payson	
St. Charles		74 San Carlos Ave, San Carlos	

=== Graham County ===
Name	Image	Location	Description/notes
St Rose of Lima		311 S. Central Ave, Safford	Founded in 1937, current church dedicated in 1963
		Our Lady of Guadalupe Church, 2257 S. 1st Ave, Solomon	Supervised by St. Rose of Lima Parish
		St. Martin de Porres Mission Church, 50 S. Main St, Pima	Supervised by St. Rose of Lima Parish

=== Greenlee County ===
Name	Image	Location	Description/notes
Greenlee County Catholics		Holy Cross Church, 205 Fairbanks Rd, Morenci	Now part of Greenlee County Catholics
		Sacred Heart Church 329 Chase Creek St, Clifton	Now part of Greenlee County Catholics
		St. Mary Mission Church, 109 3rd St, Duncan	Now part of Greenlee County Catholics

=== La Paz County ===
Name	Image	Location	Description/notes
Sacred Heart		1101 S Joshua Ave, Parker	
		St. Kateri Tekakwitha & Our Lady of Guadalupe Mission, 29070 Mohave Rd, Poston	Supervised by Sacred Heart Parish
		Our Lady Queen of Peace Mission, 5005 Mocking Bird, Quartzite	Supervised by Sacred Heart Parish
		St John the Baptist Mission 70905 Santa Fe, Wendon	Supervised by Sacred Heart Parish

=== Pima County ===
Name	Image	Location	Description/notes
Corpus Christi		300 N. Tanque Verde Loop Rd, Tucson	Founded in 1999
Saint Gianna Oratory		338 W. University Blvd, Tucson	Located at the former Holy Family Church, operated by the Institute of Christ the King
Immaculate Conception Parish – Ajo		100 N. Pizal Ln, Ajo	Founded in 1916, church dedicated in 1924
Most Holy Trinity		1300 N. Greasewood Rd, Tucson	
Our Lady of Fatima		1950 Irvington Pl, Tucson	
Our Lady Queen of all Saints		2915 E. 36th St, Tucson	
Our Lady of the Valley		505 N. La Cañada Dr, Green Valley	
Our Mother of Sorrows		1800 S. Kolb Rd, Tucson	
Sacred Heart		601 E. Fort Lowell Rd, Tucson	
St. Ambrose		300 S. Tucson Blvd, Tucson	Founded in 1946
St. Augustine Cathedral		192 S. Stone Ave, Tucson	
St. Christopher		12101 W. Moore Rd, Marana	
St Cyril of Alexandria		4725 E. Pima St, Tucson	Founded in 1951, current church dedicated in 1970
St. E. lizabeth Ann Seton		8650 N. Shannon Rd, Tucson	Founded in 1980, current church dedicated in 1995
St. Frances Cabrini-Our Lady of Lavang Church		St. Frances Cabrini Church, 3201 E. Presidio Rd, Tucson	St. Francis Church dedicated in 1956, became a parish in 1966. Merged with Our Lady of Lavang in 2021
St. Francis de Sales		1375 S. Camino Seco, Tucson	Founded in 1971, church dedicated in 1972
St John the E. vangelist		602 W. Ajo Way, Tucson	Founded as a mission in 1933, became a parish in 1941. Current church dedicated in 1949
St Joseph		215 S. Craycroft Rd, Tucson	
St. Kateri Tekakwitha		507 W. 29th St, Tucson	
		Mission Santa Rosa de Lima, 2015 N. Calle Central, Tucson	Supervised by St. Kateri Tekakwitha Parish
		San Martin de Porres Mission, 418 W. 39th St, Tucson	Supervised by St. Kateri Tekakwitha Parish
		San Ignacio de Loyola Mission, 785 W. Sahuaro St, Tucson	Supervised by St. Kateri Tekakwitha Parish
		Cristo Rey Mission, 7500 S. Camino Benem, Tucson	Supervised by St. Kateri Tekakwitha Parish
St Margaret Mary Alacoque		801 N. Grande Ave, Tucson	
St. Mark		2727 W. Tangerine Rd, Oro Valley	
St. Monica		212 W. Medina Rd, Tucson	
St Odilia		7570 N. Paseo Del Norte, Tucson	Founded in 1965, current church dedicated in 1970
Ss Peter and Paul		1946 E. Lee St, Tucson	Founded in 1930, current church dedicated in 1949
St. Pius X		1800 N. Camino Pío Décimo, Tucson	
St. Rita in the Desert		13260 E. Colossal Cave Rd, Vail	Church dedicated in 1935
St Thomas More Newman Center		1615 E. 2nd St, Tucson,	Founded in 1926, serves the University of Arizona community
St Thomas the Apostle		5150 N. Valley View Rd, Tucson	Founded in 1984, church dedicated in 1988
St. Martin de Porres		15440 S. Santa Rita Rd, Sahuarita	Current church dedicated in 1983, became a parish in 2000
San Solano Missions		Topowa	
		St Augustine Mission, Chuichu	Supervised by San Solano Missions
		San José Mission, Pisenemo	Supervised by San Solano Missions
		Our Lady of the Sacred Heart Mission, Sells	Supervised by San Solano Missions
Santa Catalina		14380 N. Oracle Rd, Tucson	
Santa Cruz		1220 S. 6th Ave, Tucson	Current church dedicated in 1916, became a parish in 1919
San Xavier del Bac Mission		1950 W. San Xavier Rd, Tucson	

=== Pinal County ===
Name	Image	Location	Description/notes
Assumption of the Blessed Virgin Mary		221 E. 8th St, Florence	Founded in 1870, current church dedicated in 1912
Blessed Sacrament		122 Church Dr, Mammoth	
Infant Jesus of Prague		501 Victoria Cir, Kearny	Current church constructed in Sonora, Arizona, in 1953, was moved to Kearny in 1966. Church rededicated in 1967
Our Lady of Grace		18700 N. St Gabriel Way, Maricopa	Formerly St. Francis de Sales Mission, became Our Lady of Grace parish in 2007
St Anthony of Padua		201 N. Picacho St, Casa Grande	
St Bartholomew		609 W. Park Pl, San Manuel	
St Francis of Assisi		60 Church Ave, Superior	
St George		300 E. 16th Ave, Apache Junction	Founded as a mission in 1949, current church dedicated in 1989
St. Helen of the Cross		205 W. 8th St, Eloy	Founded as a mission in 1936, became a parish in 1952 and current church was dedicated that same year
St Helen		66 E. Maplewood St, Oracle	Founded as a mission in 1927, became a parish in 1954
St James the Apostle		401 W. Wilson Ave, Coolidge	Founded in 1947, current church dedicated in 1949
St Michael the Archangel		26035 Apollo Dr, Florence	

=== Santa Cruz County ===
Name	Image	Location	Description/notes
Most Holy Nativity of Our Lord Jesus Christ		395 Avenida Coatimundi, Rio Rico	
Sacred Heart		272 N. Rodriguez St, Nogales	Current church dedicated in 1928
St. Ann		11 Calle Iglesia Calle, Tubac	First church constructed on this site in the 1740s. The current church (the fifth one) was dedicated in 1930
		St. Ferdinand Mission, 17140 W. Arivaca Rd, Arivaca	Supervised by St. Ann Parish
		Assumption Chapel, 17 Amado Montosa Rd, Amado	Supervised by St. Ann Parish
St Therese of Lisieux		222 N. 3rd Ave, Patagonia	
San Felipe de Jesús Parish		1901 N. Jose Gallego Dr, Nogales	

=== Yuma County ===
Name	Image	Location	Description/notes
Immaculate Conception		505 S. Avenue B, Yuma	Founded in 1868, current church dedicated in 1963
		Our Lady of Guadalupe Mission, 417 S. 15th Ave, Yuma	Current chapel dedicated in 1997. Supervised by Immaculate Conception Parish
Immaculate Heart of Mary		310 W. Spring St, Somerton	
St Francis of Assisi		1815 S. 8th Ave, Yuma	
St John Neumann		11545 E. 40th St, Yuma	Founded as a mission in the 1970s, became a parish in 1986. Current church dedicated in 2008
St. Joseph the Worker		8674 S. Ave 36 E, Wellton	Founded in 2005
St Jude Thaddeus		984 Main St, San Luis	
