= Titular bishop =

High-ranking member of the Christian clergy

A titular bishop in various churches is a bishop who is not in charge of a diocese. By definition, a bishop is an "overseer" of a community of the faithful, so when a priest is ordained a bishop, the tradition of the Catholic, Eastern Orthodox and Oriental Orthodox churches is that he be ordained for a specific place. There are more bishops than there are functioning dioceses. Therefore, a priest appointed not to head a diocese as its diocesan bishop but to be an auxiliary bishop, a papal diplomat, or an official of the Roman Curia is appointed to a titular see.

== Catholic Church ==
In the Catholic Church, a titular bishop is a bishop who is not in charge of a diocese. Examples of bishops belonging to this category are coadjutor bishops, auxiliary bishops, bishops emeriti, vicars apostolic, nuncios, superiors of departments in the Roman Curia, and cardinal bishops of suburbicarian dioceses (since they are not in charge of the suburbicarian dioceses). Most titular bishops hold the title to a titular see. Assigning titular sees serves two purposes. Since part of being a bishop means being the head of a Christian church, titular sees serve that purpose for bishops without a diocese. At the same time, the office of titular bishop memorializes ancient Churches, most of which were suppressed because they fell into the hands of non-Christian conquerors. For this reason the former terminology was not "titular bishop" but "bishop in infidel regions" (in partibus infidelium). In recent times the names of titular sees are drawn also in numerous cases from those of former dioceses which were absorbed into other dioceses or expanded and hence moved to larger towns and cities.

Since 1970, there are two more exceptions. Diocesan bishops who resign their see or are transferred to a non-diocesan appointment are no longer habitually transferred to a titular see. Instead, they take the title Bishop (or Archbishop) Emeritus of the last see. Also, coadjutors are no longer named to titular sees, instead taking the title Coadjutor Bishop (or Coadjutor Archbishop) of the see they will inherit. In other cases titular bishops still take a titular see.

Beginning in 2019, titular sees are no longer being assigned to new Vicars Apostolic.

When Francis Green was named Coadjutor Bishop of Tucson, Arizona, in 1960, his official title remained "Titular Bishop of Serra" until he succeeded Daniel James Gercke later that same year. However, when Gerald Kicanas became Coadjutor Bishop of Tucson in 2001, he ceased being Titular Bishop of Bela. He remained a titular bishop until he succeeded Manuel Moreno in 2003, but his official title changed from "Titular Bishop of Bela" to "Coadjutor Bishop of Tucson".

Cardinal bishops of suburbicarian dioceses are also titular bishops, but unlike others, they hold titles to existing dioceses, namely one or more of the suburbicarian sees near Rome. While they do not govern their see, they are obliged to give it their patronage. Angelo Sodano, as Cardinal Bishop of Albano, was titular bishop of the see, while Bishop Marcello Semeraro is its actual diocesan bishop. The Cardinal Dean is by tradition Cardinal Bishop of Ostia, in addition to the suburbicarian see he previously held.

Occasionally, the transfer of a diocesan bishop to a titular see has been used by the Holy See to strip a bishop of responsibilities when his behavior was disapproved of. For instance, in 1995, Jacques Gaillot, known for his activism on Catholic-sensitive social and political topics (such as support for contraception and abortion), was transferred from the see of Évreux in France to Parthenia, a titular see in Algeria, instead of becoming Bishop Emeritus of Évreux.

== Eastern Orthodox Church ==
Titular bishops and titular metropolitans are often appointed in the Eastern Orthodox Church.

=== Ecumenical Patriarchate ===
In the Ecumenical Patriarchate of Constantinople, titular bishops and metropolitans are usually appointed with titles of former dioceses in the regions of Thrace, Asia Minor and Pontus (all regions in what is now Turkey), that were often active until the Greek-Turkish population exchange of 1923.

=== Serbian Orthodox Church ===
In the Serbian Orthodox Church, titular bishops are usually appointed to serve as auxiliary bishops, assisting diocesan bishops in various fields of diocesan administration. One example of such a bishop was Varnava Nastić (1914–1964), titular bishop of Hvosno who had the responsibility of administering the Diocese of Dabar-Bosnia.

== See also ==
- Catholic Church hierarchy
- Titular archbishop
- List of Catholic titular sees

== Literature ==
- Codex Iuris Canonici (Code of Canon Law), Vatican City: Typis Polyglottis Vaticanis, 1983.
- Kiminas, Demetrius (2009). The Ecumenical Patriarchate: A History of Its Metropolitanates with Annotated Hierarch Catalogs. Wildside Press LLC. ISBN 978-1-4344-5876-6.
