= Demographics of the Cayman Islands =

This is a demography of the population of the Cayman Islands including population density, ethnicity, religious affiliations and other aspects of the population.

Census population and average annual growth rate
Year	Pop.	±% p.a.
1802	933	—
1891	4,322	+1.74%
1911	5,564	+1.27%
1921	5,270	−0.54%
1934	5,930	+0.91%
1943	6,690	+1.35%
1960	8,511	+1.43%
1970	10,068	+1.69%
1979	16,677	+5.77%
1989	25,335	+4.27%
1999	39,410	+4.52%
2010	54,397	+2.97%
2021	78,554	+3.40%
2024	88,833	+4.18%

== Population ==
Population Distribution
Nationalities	percent
Caymanian	53.6%
Jamaican	20%
Filipino	8.0%
British	4.0%
Indian	3.0%
Other Expat Groups	11.4%

With its success in the tourism and financial service industries, the Cayman Islands have attracted many international businesses and citizens to relocate. The largest numbers of expatriates living in the Cayman Islands hail from Jamaica (11,703), the United Kingdom (1,708), the Philippines (4,119), and India (1,218). Approximately 8,139 more residents are citizens of various other countries. While the government does not restrict foreign land ownership, it does strongly enforce its immigration laws. Businesses are required to grant access to job openings to Caymanian citizens first; if none of them are suitable, the business may then seek employees from other countries. In order to work in the Cayman Islands, foreigners must have a job offer before immigrating. The Cayman Islands population is expected to reach 100,000 people before 2030, as an explosion in immigration after COVID-19 lockdowns continues to increase the population significantly.

=== Structure of the population ===
Population Estimates by Sex and Age Group (31.XII.2013): :

Age group	Male	Female	Total	%
Total	27 106	28 585	55 691	100
0–14	4 512	4 831	9 343	16.78
15–24	2 873	2 916	5 789	10.39
25–34	4 727	5 043	9 771	17.55
35–44	5 746	5 955	11 701	21.01
45–54	4 836	5 070	9 907	17.79
55–64	2 530	2 744	5 274	9.47
65+	1 881	2 025	3 907	7.02

Population by Age Group (Census 01.X.2021):

Age group	Total	%
Total	71 105	100
0–4	3 683	5.18
5–9	3 700	5.20
10–14	3 931	5.53
15–19	3 254	4.58
20–24	3 552	5.00
25–29	5 445	7.66
30–34	6 776	9.53
35–39	7 086	9.97
40–44	6 870	9.66
45–49	6 559	9.22
50–54	5 939	8.35
55–59	4 833	6.80
60–64	3 358	4.72
65+	5 602	7.88
Age group	Total	Percent
0–14	11 314	15.91
15–64	53 674	75.49
65+	5 602	7.88
unknown	515	0.72

=== District populations ===
The vast majority of its residents live on the island of Grand Cayman, at 67,493. According to the 2021 census, only 2,163 people lived on Cayman Brac or Little Cayman, bringing the total population to 69,656, broken down as follows:

- George Town: 34,399
- West Bay: 14,931
- Bodden Town: 14,268
- North Side: 1,840
- East End: 1,749
- Cayman Brac and Little Cayman (Sister Islands): 2,163

== Vital statistics ==
	Average population (x 1000)	Live births	Deaths	Natural change	Crude birth rate (per 1000)	Crude death rate (per 1000)	Natural change (per 1000)	Infant mortality rate (per 1000 live births)
1950	6.4	198	58	140	30.9	9.0	21.8	
1951	6.3	213	42	171	34.0	6.7	27.3	
1952	6.2	197	46	151	31.5	7.4	24.2	
1953	6.3	244	32	212	38.6	5.1	33.5	
1954	6.5	237	48	189	36.6	7.4	29.2	
1955	6.7	226	52	174	33.9	7.8	26.1	
1956	6.9	235	62	173	34.0	9.0	25.0	
1957	7.2	248	60	188	34.6	8.4	26.2	
1958	7.4	207	66	141	27.9	8.9	19.0	
1959	7.7	272	50	222	35.5	6.5	29.0	
1960	7.9	264	54	210	33.6	6.9	26.7	
1961	8.0	277	68	209	34.5	8.5	26.0	
1962	8.1	290	51	239	35.6	6.3	29.4	
1963	8.2	303	61	242	36.8	7.4	29.4	
1964	8.3	270	73	197	32.5	8.8	23.7	
1965	8.4	241	63	178	28.8	7.5	21.3	
1966	8.4	267	67	200	31.6	7.9	23.7	
1967	8.5	269	60	209	31.6	7.0	24.5	
1968	8.6	282	54	228	32.7	6.3	26.4	
1969	8.8	272	46	226	30.8	5.2	25.6	
1970	9.1	313	71	242	34.2	7.8	26.5	
1971	9.6	287	65	222	29.9	6.8	23.2	
1972	10.1	351	68	283	34.6	6.7	27.9	
1973	10.8	319	83	236	29.6	7.7	21.9	
1974	11.5	281	84	197	24.4	7.3	17.1	
1975	12.2	327	77	250	26.7	6.3	20.4	
1976	13.3	282	81	201	21.7	6.2	15.4	
1977	13.8	270	84	186	19.5	6.1	13.4	
1978	14.7	273	78	195	18.6	5.3	13.3	
1979	15.4	289	98	191	18.7	6.3	12.4	
1980	16.2	326	105	221	20.2	6.5	13.7	
1981	16.8	347	106	241	20.7	6.3	14.3	
1982	17.4	339	107	232	19.5	6.2	13.4	
1983	17.9	387	105	282	21.6	5.9	15.7	
1984	18.5	414	114	300	22.3	6.1	16.2	
1985	19.3	367	126	241	19.0	6.5	12.5	
1986	20.3	360	141	219	17.8	7.0	10.8	
1987	21.3	359	118	241	16.8	5.5	11.3	
1988	22.5	380	124	256	16.9	5.5	11.4	
1989	23.8	438	122	316	18.4	5.1	13.3	
1990	25.0	490	120	370	19.6	4.8	14.8	
1991	26.2	500	127	373	19.1	4.8	14.2	
1992	27.4	520	128	392	19.0	4.7	14.3	
1993	28.7	528	133	395	18.4	4.6	13.8	
1994	30.1	531	149	382	17.7	5.0	12.7	
1995	31.7	485	110	375	15.3	3.5	11.8	
1996	33.5	560	125	435	16.7	3.7	13.0	
1997	35.6	572	123	449	16.1	3.5	12.6	
1998	37.7	545	117	428	14.4	3.1	11.3	
1999	39.8	604	128	476	15.2	3.2	12.0	
2000	41.7	619	137	482	14.8	3.3	11.6	
2001	43.3	622	132	490	14.4	3.0	11.3	
2002	44.7	583	120	463	13.0	2.7	10.3	13.7
2003	46.0	623	153	470	13.5	3.3	10.2	4.8
2004	47.3	611	165	446	12.9	3.5	9.4	6.4
2005	48.6	699	170	529	14.4	3.5	10.9	7.0
2006	52.229	710	182	528	13.4	3.4	10.0	8.7
2007	52.939	744	160	584	13.8	3.0	10.8	8.3
2008	55.448	793	166	627	14.2	3.0	11.2	2.5
2009	56.507	824	177	647	14.6	3.1	11.4	3.7
2010	55.521	821	164	657	14.8	3.0	11.8	2.5
2011	55.277	800	176	624	14.5	3.2	11.3	6.3
2012	56.124	759	172	587	13.6	3.3	10.3	4.0
2013	56.239	705	182	523	12.5	3.2	9.3	2.9
2014	56.993	711	163	548	12.5	2.9	9.6	
2015	59.054	649	170	479	11.0	2.9	8.1	
2016	61.331	660	193	467	10.8	3.1	7.7	
2017	63.115	625	216	409	9.9	3.4	6.5	
2018	64.420	640	214	426	9.9	3.3	6.6	
2019	69.914	646	250	396	9.2	3.7	5.5	
2020	65.786	817	215	602	12.4	3.3	9.1	
2021	67.721	818	341	477	12.4	4.0	8.4	
2022	78.554	798	310	488	10.2	3.9	6.3	
2023	83.671	760	308	452	9.1	3.7	5.4	
2024	87.866	746	307	439	8.5	3.5	5.0	
2025		730	293	437	8.1	3.2	4.9	

== Ethnic groups ==
Ethnic groups of Cayman Islands
Ethnic groups	percent
Mixed	41.3%
White	24.1%
Black	23.9%
South Asian	8.1%
Other	2.6%

Although many Caribbean islands were initially populated by Amerindian groups such as the Taíno and Kalinago, no evidence of this has been found in the Cayman Islands. Therefore, native Caymanians do not have any Amerindian heritage from their own islands; however, a significant number of Jamaicans have settled in the Cayman Islands over the years, so they and their descendants may have some Amerindian blood via Jamaica. Slavery was less common on the Cayman Islands than in many other parts of the Caribbean, resulting in a more even distribution of African and European ancestry. Those of mixed race make up 41.3% of the population, with white Caymanians and immigrants of European ancestry making up 24.1%, and black Caymanians and immigrants of African ancestry following at 23.9%. South Asians, mainly Filipinos and Indians, as well as Caymanians of South Asian descent, make up 8.1%, and the remaining 2.6% belong to various ethnic groups.

== Language ==
Languages spoken at home
Languages	percent
English	79.3%
Spanish	9.4%
Tagalog	8.2%
Other	3.1%

The official language of the Cayman Islands is English. The Caymanian accent retains elements passed down from English, Scottish, and Welsh settlers (among others) in a language variety known as Cayman Creole. Young Caymanians often borrow terms from Jamaican patois due to the popularity of Jamaican pop culture and influences from Jamaican immigrants in the islands. It is also quite commonplace to hear some residents converse in Spanish as many citizens have relocated from Latin America to work and live on Grand Cayman. The Latin American nations with greatest representation are Honduras, Cuba, Colombia, Nicaragua, and the Dominican Republic. Spanish speakers comprise almost 10% of the population and is predominantly of the Caribbean dialect. Tagalog is spoken by about 8% of inhabitants most of whom are Filipino residents on work permits. The remainder of the population converse in various languages, with some including Hindi, Afrikaans and Portuguese.

== Religion ==
christian

Religion of the Cayman Islands (2021)
Religions	percent
Christian	66.9%
No Religion	25%
Hindu	1.7%
Muslim	0.4%
Rastafarian	0.3%
Jewish	0.2%
Not Specified	5.5%

Religion of Cayman Islands, detailed (2021)
Religions	percent
Church of God	19.5%
Roman Catholic	13.6%
Seventh-day Adventist	8.7%
No Religion	25%
Baptist	6.9%
Presbyterian/United Church	5.7%
Pentecostal	6.8%
Other	3.9%
Anglican	2.8%
Wesleyan Holiness	1.5%
Jewish	0.2%
Jehovah's Witness	0.9%
Unspecified	1.6%

The predominant religion on the Cayman Islands, as of 2021, is Christianity at 66.9%; this is down from over 80% in 2010. Denominations practiced include; Church of God, United Church, Anglican Church, Baptist Church, Roman Catholic Church, Seventh-day Adventist Church, and Pentecostal Church. Roman Catholic churches are St. Ignatius Church, George Town and Stella Maris Church, Cayman Brac. Many citizens are deeply religious, regularly going to church, however, the number of Caymanians who identify as non-religious has skyrocketed since the 2010 census, with around 25% professing no religion or a denomination not widespread. This is up from 9.3% during the last census. Ports are closed on Sundays and Christian holidays. There are places of worship in George Town for Jehovah's Witnesses and followers of the Baháʼí Faith. The Cayman Islands also hosts a growing Jewish community.

Year	Percent of Hindus	Increase
2000	0.25%	
2008	1%	+0.75%
2011	0.8%	−0.2%
2021	2.4%	+2.6%

Hinduism is a minority religion in the Cayman Islands and is one of the smallest religions. Although it is unknown as to when Hinduism was introduced to the Cayman Islands. There is no Hindu temple located in the Cayman Islands, but there is at least one home which is set aside for the purpose of worship. There were only 98 Hindus in Cayman according to the 2000 census (about 0.25% of the population). In the 2008 census, the number of Hindus increased to 510 (1% of the total population). The 2010 Census showed the number of Hindus decreasing to 454 (0.8% of the total Cayman Islands population).
