= St. Augustine Catholic High School (Tucson, Arizona) =

Private, coeducational school

Location
- 8800 East 22nd Street; Tucson, Pima County, Arizona 85710; United States
- 32°12′13″N 110°48′15″W

Information
- Type: Private, coeducational
- Religious affiliation: Roman Catholic
- Established: 2003 (23 years ago)
- Oversight: Diocese of Tucson
- CEEB code: 030542
- President: David Keller
- Principal: Barbara Monsegur
- Grades: 9–12
- Colors: Scarlet and silver
- Team name: Wolves
- Accreditation: Western Catholic Educational Association
- Newspaper: The Howler
- Website: www.staugustinehigh.com

St. Augustine Catholic High School is a private, coeducational, Roman Catholic high school on the east side of Tucson, Arizona, United States, located in and administered by the Diocese of Tucson.

The school opened in August 2003. As of the 2022–23 school year it enrolled 260 students, and was accredited as a college-preparatory school by the Western Catholic Educational Association.

The school draws from throughout the Tucson area; approximately 74 percent of the student body was Hispanic/Latino by ancestry. About 95 percent of students received financial aid, and of those, 75 percent had their tuition fully covered by aid.
