= Edward Weisenburger =

American Catholic prelate (born 1960)

His Excellency, The Most Reverend Edward Weisenburger
- Archbishop of Detroit
- Church: Catholic
- Archdiocese: Detroit
- Appointed: February 11, 2025
- Installed: March 18, 2025
- Predecessor: Allen Vigneron
- Previous posts: Ecclesiastical Superior of the Cayman Islands (2025-2026); Bishop of Tucson (2017‍–‍2025); Bishop of Salina (2012‍–‍2017)

Orders
- Ordination: December 19, 1987 by Charles Salatka
- Consecration: May 1, 2012 by Joseph Naumann, Eusebius J. Beltran, and Paul Stagg Coakley

Personal details
- Born: December 23, 1960 (age 65) Alton, Illinois, US
- Education: Conception Seminary College; American College Seminary; St. Paul University
- Motto: Ecce agnus Dei (Latin for 'Behold the lamb of God')

Styles of Edward Weisenburger
- Reference style: His Excellency; The Most Reverend
- Spoken style: Your Excellency
- Religious style: Archbishop

Coat of arms as bishop of Tucson

Coat of arms as bishop of Salina

Edward Joseph Weisenburger (born December 23, 1960) is an American Catholic prelate who serves as Archbishop of Detroit. He previously served as Bishop of Tucson from 2017 to 2025 and as Bishop of Salina from 2012 to 2017.

== Biography ==
=== Early life ===
Weisenburger was born in Alton, Illinois on December 23, 1960, to Edward and Asella (Walters) Weisenburger. He grew up primarily in Lawton, Oklahoma, where he attended St. Barbara School and graduated from Eisenhower High School in 1979. He began his studies at Conception Seminary College in Conception, Missouri, graduating with honors in 1983. and then attend the American College Seminary at the Catholic University of Leuven in Belgium. He earned his Bachelor of Theology and Master of Religious Studies degrees in 1986. He received his Master of Arts in Religious Studies and Master of Moral and Religious Sciences degrees in Leuven in 1987.

=== Priesthood ===
On December 19, 1987, Weisenburger was ordained to the priesthood for the Archdiocese of Oklahoma City in the Cathedral of Our Lady of Perpetual Help in Oklahoma City by Archbishop Charles Salatka. After his ordination, the archdiocese assigned Weisenburger to St. Mary Parish in Ponca City, Oklahoma. He was sent in 1990 to Ottawa, Ontario to study at St. Paul University in Ottawa, Ontario. He earned a Licentiate of Canon Law degree in 1992. After returning to Oklahoma, Weisenburger was appointed vice chancellor and adjutant judicial vicar for the archdiocese.

Weisenburger was appointed pastor of Holy Trinity Parish in Okarche, Oklahoma in 1995. That same year, he also began 17 years of service on the Council of Priests and the archdiocesan college of consultors. After the Oklahoma City bombing on April 19, 1995, he volunteered as an on-site chaplain for rescue workers. In 1996, Archbishop Eusebius J. Beltran named Weisenburger as vicar general of the archdiocese.

In 2002, Weisenburger was named pastor and then rector of the Cathedral of Our Lady of Perpetual Help Parish. He was also named as promoter of justice for the canonization of Reverend Stanley Rother, an Oklahoma priest murdered in 1981 by a death squad in Guatemala. In 2009, the Vatican elevated Weisenburger to the rank of prelate of honor with the title monsignor.

=== Bishop of Salina ===
Weisenburger was appointed bishop of Salina by Pope Benedict XVI on February 6, 2012. He was consecrated at Sacred Heart Cathedral in Salina, Kansas by Archbishop Joseph Fred Naumann.

=== Bishop of Tucson ===
On October 3, 2017, Weisenburger was named the seventh bishop of Tucson by Pope Francis. He was installed on November 29, 2017.

=== Archbishop of Detroit ===
On February 11, 2025, Weisenburger was appointed as archbishop of Detroit, succeeding Allen Vigneron. His installation occurred on March 18, 2025.

On November 19, 2026, pastoral care of the Cayman Islands was transferred from the Archdiocese of Detroit to the Archdiocese of Miami.

==== Dismissal of theologians at Sacred Heart Major Seminary ====
In 2025, Weisenburger terminated three professors of theology and canon law, Dr. Ralph Martin, Dr. Eduardo Echeverria, and Dr. Edward N. Peters, from Sacred Heart Major Seminary in Detroit, without explanation.

The professors had previously critiqued certain statements and teachings of Pope Francis, particularly regarding theological clarity. For example, in January 2024, Martin wrote a column for the National Catholic Register arguing that Francis’s remarks expressing hope that hell is empty could inadvertently support the heresy of Universalism, which posits that all will be saved. A spokesman for the archdiocese declined to comment on the firings.

==== Parish restructuring ====
On November 16, 2025, Weisenburger announced a two-year process of parish and administrative restructuring. In a letter read at Masses he said the archdiocese could no longer sustain the number of buildings and ministries built for a larger Catholic population. Official figures cited a decline from approximately 1.5 million Catholics in the mid-1980s to about 900,000, with roughly 150,000 regular Mass-goers, and a projected drop in active priests available for parish ministry. The process is intended to replace the earlier “Families of Parishes” groupings with “pastorates” — clusters of one or more parishes under a single pastor and leadership team. Some church buildings are expected to close or lose Sunday Masses; the archdiocese has claimed that no list of closures was predetermined. Implementation is scheduled to begin July 1, 2027.

Preparatory work began shortly after Weisenburger’s installation and included listening sessions with priests. In January 2026 nearly 175 priests met at Sacred Heart Major Seminary to draft pastorate models, which were then to be presented at two listening sessions in each parish in spring 2026. Final pastorate decisions and priest assignments are to be announced in early 2027.

Local opposition emerged as draft models circulated. In September 2026 parishioners of St. Mary, Cause of Our Joy in Westland organized a petition of more than 400 signatures and received a letter of support from the city’s mayor after a proposed alignment threatened to end Sunday Masses at the parish. The archdiocese responded that no final decisions had been made.

Weisenburger has described the effort as necessary “right-sizing” so that remaining parishes and priests can be “mission-ready,” while acknowledging that closures of historic buildings would be painful.

== Positions ==
=== Implementation of Traditionis custodes ===
In July 2025, Weisenburger banned the celebration of the Tridentine Mass in parishes. This was based on Traditionis custodes, the 2021 apostolic letter issued by Pope Francis on the Tridentine Mass. Under the new rules, the masses could only take place in non-parochial settings, such as St. Joseph Shrine, and three other designated settings. Priests not assigned to these sites could request permission to celebrate the liturgy on weekdays. The diocese also prohibited lay people from attending Tridentine Masses. In addition, priests performing the masses would have to follow strict conditions, including annual renewal and a written affirmation of the validity of the Novus Ordo liturgy.

The July 2025 decree also prohibited the ad orientem posture by priests in the Novus Ordo liturgy, mandating the use of freestanding altars in all parish churches within 180 days. Additionally, the diocese also required that priests read scriptures in the liturgy using the vernacular language of the parish, employing only translations approved by the United States Conference of Catholic Bishops. In announcing these changes, Weisenburger emphasized the need for unity under papal and episcopal leadership while acknowledging the “rich expressions of the Catholic faith in southeast Michigan."

=== Sexual abuse ===
During his tenure as vicar general of Oklahoma City (1996–2012), Weisenburger helped evaluate allegations of sexual abuse by clergy. The Survivors Network of those Abused by Priests (SNAP) criticized the diocesan response to these allegations, citing a lack of transparency and action in addressing cases of accused priests.

As bishop of Tucson (2017–2025), Weisenburger addressed sexual misconduct within the diocese. In September 2018, he announced the firing of ten diocesan employees and rescinded clearances for twelve unpaid workers due to allegations of sexual misconduct. He noted these individuals likely passed initial screenings, but the diocese identified issues during clearance renewals or from separate incidents. Weisenburger stated that the diocese had “no known allegations of sexual misconduct with minors against any of our priests in active ministry today.” In response to a 2018 Pennsylvania grand jury report detailing widespread clergy abuse, Weisenburger denounced the actions of offending priests as “criminal and sinful.” He emphasized the diocese’s policy of reporting allegations to law enforcement, as established in a 2002 agreement with the Pima County Attorney’s Office.

In December 2020, the Diocese of Tucson, along with the Archdiocese of Los Angeles, was named in a federal racketeering lawsuit by two individuals alleging sexual abuse by four priests in Arizona during the 1970s. One plaintiff, Diana Almader-Douglas, claimed abuse by Charles Knapp when she was five years old in Pirtleville, Arizona. Weisenburger stated that when the diocese learned of these allegations, it had immediately notified police, who declined to investigate them. In addition, an external investigation could not determine the credibility of the allegations. A third individual joined the lawsuit in 2021.

In 2018, Weisenburger linked the prevalence of sexual abuse to the cultural shifts of the 1960s so-called “sexual revolution,” a perspective criticized by some as deflecting responsibility from the Church’s institutional failures. The Diocese of Tucson signed a $14 million settlement in 2002 for clergy abuse cases from the 1960s to 1980s and a Chapter 11 bankruptcy filing in 2004 to address 22 related lawsuits, creating a $22 million settlement pool. Weisenburger acknowledged these past issues, stating, “What happened in the past brought us to this point, and from here, we move forward and will always do it correctly.”

=== Immigration ===
Weisenburger has been outspoken in support of immigrants. At a 2018 conference of bishops, he suggested bishops might issue canonical penalties, potentially including a denial of holy communion or excommunication, to Catholic federal agents who enforce Trump-era immigration laws.

As bishop of Tucson, Weisenburger oversaw immigrant programs, including the Casa Alitas shelter operated by Catholic Community Services of Southern Arizona. Casa Alitas provides temporary shelter, food, and medical care to those who are released from U.S. Customs and Border Protection and Immigration and Customs Enforcement custody, and operates multiple facilities in Tucson, including a housing site at a repurposed hotel. In 2024, U.S. Congressman Juan Ciscomani, representing Arizona’s 6th District, called for a federal investigation into Catholic Community Services’ use of taxpayer funds for Casa Alitas. He alleged potential financial mismanagement and a contractor-hiring violation involving inflated charges by a laundry service. Pima County officials confirmed an ongoing investigation into compliance with federal and county grant rules.

In a 2025 article for America magazine, Weisenburger advocated for a compassionate approach to U.S. immigration reform, emphasizing the human dignity of migrants and critiquing the inefficiencies of the current system, such as visa backlogs and harsh deportation policies. Drawing on his experience as a bishop on the Arizona-Mexico border and the philosophy of Emmanuel Levinas, he urged recognition of immigrants’ contributions and the moral imperative to treat them with reverence, aligning with Catholic social teaching.

In July 2025, Weisenburger opposed the passage of the One Big Beautiful Bill Act, which allocated approximately $46.5 billion for new segments of the Mexico-United States border wall and $120 billion for other immigration enforcement infrastructure. He said this would increase suffering by driving potential undocumented immigrants into dangerous border regions, increasing reliance on smugglers.

On July 14, 2025, Weisenburger participated in a procession organized by "Strangers No Longer," a grassroots organization of Catholics including clergy advocating particularly for amnesty rights for immigrants, from Most Holy Trinity Church to the U.S. Immigration and Customs Enforcement (ICE) Field Office in Detroit. The event, described as a “solemn procession,” aimed to deliver a letter to ICE Field Office Director Kevin Raycraft, requesting a meeting to discuss concerns about law enforcement practices, including the use of face masks by agents, arrests without federal warrants, and the detention of individuals without felony convictions. The letter was co-signed by David Buersmeyer and Judith Brooks, the group’s board president. ICE officials declined to accept the letter.

Weisenburger offered a prayer before the march, emphasizing the Church’s call to uphold the dignity of immigrants, stating, “You call us to reverence your presence in all those we meet, but most especially the poor, the needy, the troubled, and the immigrant.” He further underscored the event’s alignment with Catholic social teaching, particularly the principles of human dignity and the common good, and described it as a “prophetic witness” to America’s tradition of charity and welcome.

=== Environmentalism ===
In March 2024, Weisenburger publicly thanked Pope Francis for his critique of "irresponsible" American lifestyles contributing to anthropogenic climate change, as outlined in Pope Francis’ apostolic exhortation Laudate Deum. This document, a follow-up to the encyclical Laudato Si', specifically highlighted the disproportionate per capita emissions in the United States compared to other nations, urging a shift away from unsustainable Western lifestyles.

Weisenburger’s environmentalism was notable for its alignment with Pope Francis’s call for urgent action on the climate crisis, a position that contrasts with the focus of other Catholic leaders on issues such as abortion, marriage, or religious liberty. His participation in a November 2024 White House meeting with Biden administration officials, including senior climate adviser John Podesta, underscored his commitment.

At a University of Arizona event in March 2024, Weisenburger praised Pope Francis for directly challenging American consumption patterns, stating, “I’m a very proud American, but I was so grateful the Holy Father had the nerve to go after us.”

=== COVID-19 vaccine mandates ===
In August 2021, Weisenburger issued a statement to his clergy, directing them not to be involved in supporting applications for religious exemptions from COVID-19 vaccine or mask mandates. He said that “all current anti-Covid-19 vaccines may be received without moral compromise,” citing the CDF’s 2020 note about the moral distinction between formal and material cooperation. He acknowledged the ethical concerns about fetal cell lines but maintained that the Church’s teaching resolved these concerns, making exemptions based on Catholic faith untenable.

== See also ==
- Catholic Church hierarchy
- Catholic Church in the United States
- Historical list of the Catholic bishops of the United States
- List of Catholic bishops of the United States
- Lists of patriarchs, archbishops, and bishops

Catholic Church titles
| Preceded by Paul Stagg Coakley | Bishop of Salina; 2012 – 2017 | Succeeded by Gerald Lee Vincke |
| Preceded by Gerald Frederick Kicanas | Bishop of Tucson; 2017 – 2025 | Succeeded by James Misko |
| Preceded by Allen Vigneron | Archbishop of Detroit; 2025 – present | Incumbent |
| Preceded by Allen Vigneron | Ecclesiastical Superior of the Cayman Islands; 2025 – 2026 | Succeeded by Thomas Wenski |
