= Sexual abuse scandal in the Roman Catholic Diocese of Tucson =

The sexual abuse scandal in the Roman Catholic Diocese of Tucson in Arizona in the United States resulted in at least 34 priests, religious brothers, and permanent deacons having credible accusations of sexual abuse of minors or possession of child pornography over the last several decades. Of that number, three clergy were convicted of sexual abuse crimes and sentenced to prison.

In 2002, the diocese settled 11 sexual abuse cases. However, the increasing number of these cases forced the diocese to enter bankruptcy protection in 2004. In 2005, it agree to pay $22 million to settle 77 lawsuits as part of its plan to exit bankruptcy.

== 1960 to 2000 ==
Ed Oliver in 1967 molested a minor. The priest pleaded guilty and was sentenced to six to seven years of probation. The diocese returned him to ministry and later promoted him to dean of the Yuma area.

== 2000 to 2010 ==
Philip Spears, a fifth-grade teacher at St. Francis of Assisi Catholic School in Yuma, was accused in 2000 of sexually molesting five female students. He was convicted in 2002 on child pornography charges and sentenced to 34 years in prison. In 2004, he was also convicted of child molestation and sentenced to 71 years in prison. In August 2003, the diocese reached a $1.8 million financial settlement with victims' families. Spears was convicted in August 2007 on two counts of child molestation of two victims. He was sentenced to 34 years in prison.

Bishop Manuel D. Moreno announced a financial settlement in January 2002 for eleven lawsuit sexual abuse lawsuits filed against the diocese. In August 2002, Juan Guillen, the associate pastor at Immaculate Conception Parish in Yuma, was charged with over twelve felony charges for molesting four altar boys during the 1990s. He pleaded guilty in April 2003 to two counts of attempted child molestation. He was sentenced to 10 years in state prison.

The diocese filed for Chapter 11 bankruptcy protection in September 2004 in order to compensate sexual abuse victims. The diocese negotiated a $22 million financial settlement for 77 outstanding claims as well as a fund for any future claims. The diocese emerged from bankruptcy in September 2005.The Diocese of Tucson in 2005 reached an agreement in bankruptcy court to pay a $22.2 million settlement to victims of sex abuse by clergy. In 2013, Stephanie Innes of the Arizona Daily Star labeled the diocese as a "dumping ground" for abusive priests after it was revealed that several accused clergy from other diocese were sent to Tucson.

Gary Underwood was indicted in December 2006 on charges of sexual conduct with a minor and child molestation. Two had accused him of sexual assault in 1983 and 1984 when he was on the staff of St. Odilia's Parish in Tucson. Underwood would drink beer with the boys and show them pornographic films in the parish rectory. In May 2007, he was indicted again for the sexual abuse of a third boy in the same parish. Underwood in May 2008 pleaded guilty to six counts of sexual conduct with a minor. He was sentenced in August 2008 to 10 years in prison.

== 2010 to present ==
In 2018, Bishop Weisenburger stated that the diocese had fired ten employees over the past ten years due to charges of sexual misconduct against them.
