= Francis Joseph Green =

Catholic bishop

His Excellency, The Most Reverend Francis Joseph Green
- Bishop of Tucson; Titular Bishop of Serra
- Diocese: Diocese of Tucson
- In office: September 28, 1960 to July 28, 1981
- Predecessor: Daniel James Gercke
- Successor: Manuel Duran Moreno
- Other posts: Auxiliary Bishop of Tucson; 1953 to 1960; Coadjutor Bishop of Tucson; May 1960 to September 1960

Orders
- Ordination: May 15, 1932 by Daniel James Gercke
- Consecration: September 7, 1954 by Daniel Gercke

Personal details
- Born: July 7, 1906 Corning, New York
- Died: May 11, 1995 (aged 88) Tucson, Arizona, US
- Denomination: Roman Catholic
- Education: St. Joseph's College; St. Patrick's Seminary
- Motto: Duce Maria (Let Mary lead)

Francis Joseph Green (July 7, 1906 – May 11, 1995) was an American prelate of the Roman Catholic Church. He served as bishop of the Diocese of Tucson in Arizona from 1960 to 1981.

== Biography ==
=== Early life ===
Francis Green was born on July 7, 1906, in Corning, New York. The family moved to Prescott, Arizona, following his father's death in 1919. As a young man, Green labored in the workshops of the Santa Fe Railroad. In 1920, he entered St. Joseph's College in Mountain View, California . Green completed his theological studies at St. Patrick's Seminary in Menlo Park, California.

=== Priesthood ===
Green was ordained to the priesthood in Tucson at the Cathedral of Saint Augustine for the Diocese of Tucson on May 15, 1932 by Bishop Daniel James Gercke.He later became pastor of the SS. Peter and Paul Parish in Tucson in 1937. He was named both a domestic prelate and vicar general of the diocese in 1950.

=== Auxiliary Bishop, Coadjutor Bishop and Bishop of Tucson ===
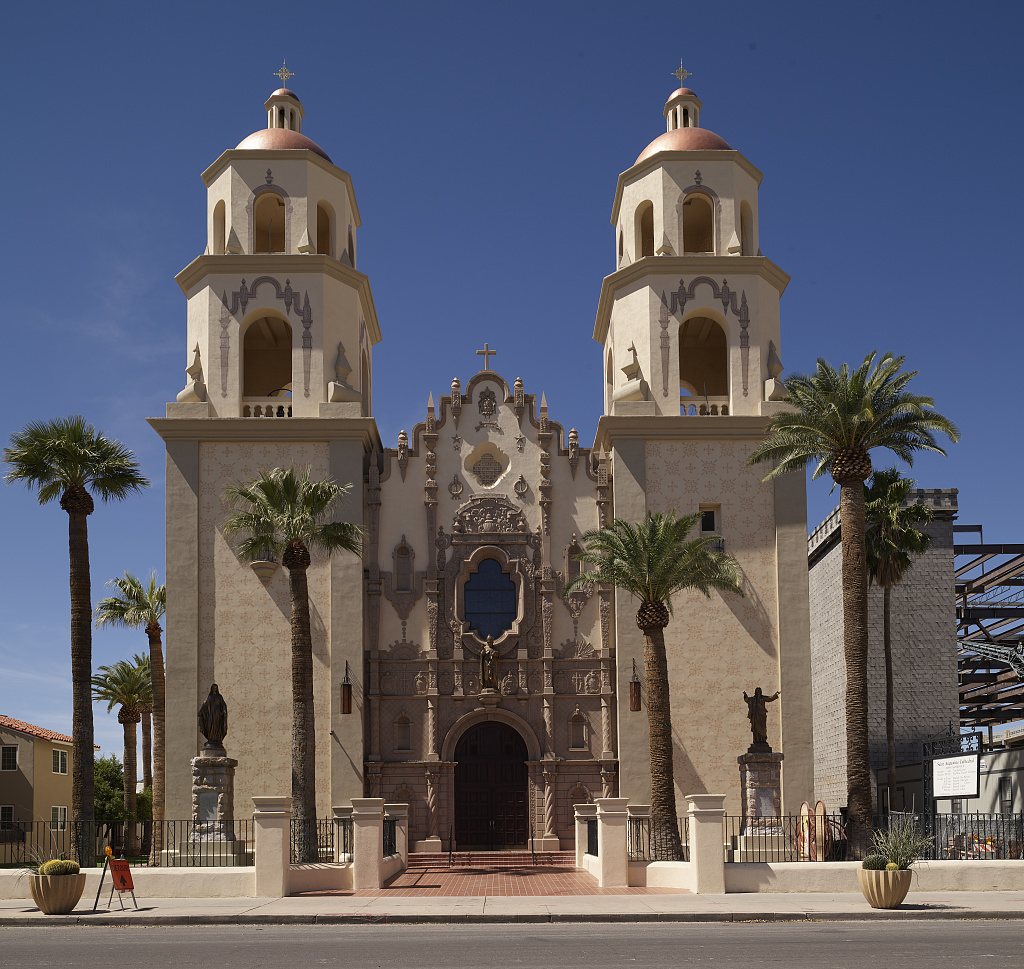
Cathedral of Saint Augustine, Tucson, Arizona (2018)

On May 29, 1953, Green was appointed as an auxiliary bishop of the Diocese of Tucson and titular bishop of Serra by Pope Pius XII. He received his episcopal consecration on September 7, 1953, from Bishop Daniel Gercke, with Bishops James Davis and Hugh Donohoe serving as co-consecrators. Green was named coadjutor bishop of Tucson by Pope John XXIII on May 11, 1960.

Upon the resignation of Bishop Daniel James Gercke, Green automatically succeeded him as the fourth bishop of Tucson on September 28, 1960. He attended all four sessions of the Second Vatican Council in Rome between 1962 and 1965, calling it "one of the great experiences of [his] life." He began major restoration on the Cathedral of Saint Augustine in 1966, completing the effort in 1968. Green was instrumental in founding the Arizona Ecumenical Council, became an advocate of social justice, and provide ministries for African American, Native American, and Hispanic Catholics.

=== Retirement and legacy ===
Pope John Paul II accepted Green's resignation as bishop of Tucson on July 28, 1981. Francis Green died in Tucson on May 11, 1995, at age 88.

Catholic Church titles
Preceded by Daniel James Gercke	Bishop of Tucson; 1960–1981	Succeeded by Manuel Duran Moreno
