= Mission sui iuris of the Cayman Islands =

Latin Catholic ecclesiastical jurisdiction in the Caribbean

Coordinates: 19.2767°N 81.3868°W

Mission sui iuris of the Cayman Islands Missio sui iuris insularum Cayanensium

Location
- Country: Cayman Islands
- Ecclesiastical province: Province of Kingston in Jamaica

Statistics
- Area: 268 km^{2} (103 sq mi) (Note: Annuario Pontificio (2022) via Catholic-Hierarchy.org)
- Population: Total; Catholics: (as of 2022); 64,958; 9,159 (14.1%)
- Parishes: 1

Information
- Denomination: Catholic
- Sui iuris church: Latin Church
- Rite: Roman Rite
- Established: July 14, 2000; 26 years ago
- Secular priests: 2 (religious)

Current leadership
- Pope: Leo XIV
- Superior: Thomas Wenski

Map
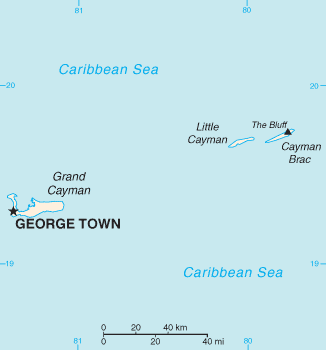

Website
- ignatius.ky

The Mission sui iuris of the Cayman Islands (Latin: Missio sui iuris Insularum Caimanensium) is a mission sui iuris of the Latin Church of the Catholic Church in the Caribbean.

The mission comprises the entirety of the British dependency of the Cayman Islands and consists of five parishes, including Saint Ignatius in George Town, Christ the Redeemer Church in West Bay, and Stella Maris Church on Cayman Brac. The mission was erected on 14 July 2000 on territory divided from the Archdiocese of Kingston in Jamaica, the metropolitan see to which it is suffragan.

Exceptionally, the mission is not "exempt", i. e., directly dependent on the Apostolic See and thus independent of a metropolitan archdiocese, but rather is a suffragan of the ecclesiastical province of the Metropolitan Archdiocese of Kingston in Jamaica, and thus a member of the Antilles Episcopal Conference. However, the mission is held in personal union with the Archdiocese of Miami in the U.S. State of Florida.

== Ecclesiastical Superiors ==
The following Catholic prelates have served as canonical ordinary of the mission, who is titled its "Ecclesiastical Superior":

- Cardinal Adam Joseph Maida (2000–2009)
- Archbishop Allen Henry Vigneron (2009–2025)
- Archbishop Edward Weisenburger (2025–2026)
- Archbishop Thomas Wenski (2026-present)

== Relationship with the Archdiocese of Detroit ==
In November 2000, the Archdiocese of Detroit was assigned pastoral responsibility for the Catholic Church in the Cayman Islands. On November 19, 2026, pastoral responsibility was transferred to the Archdiocese of Miami by Pope Leo XIV.
