= Western Catholic Educational Association =

Accreditation agency for US Roman Catholic schools

The Western Catholic Educational Association (WCEA) is a private educational accreditation agency for elementary and secondary Catholic schools in Western United States.

== History ==
It was founded in 1957 in San Francisco.

For the 2022–23 academic year, it accredited 740 elementary schools, 148 secondary schools, and 14 pK-12 schools in its member jurisdictions.

The WCEA offers co-accreditation with other organizations in its regions, including the Western Association of Schools and Colleges, Cognia, California Association of Independent Schools, and the Hawaii Association of Independent Schools.

== Membership ==
As of 2022, the WCEA had thirty members, all Latin Church dioceses and archdiocesesocated in the Western United States and Guam:

- Roman Catholic Archdiocese of Agana
- Roman Catholic Diocese of Boise
- Roman Catholic Diocese of Colorado Springs
- Roman Catholic Diocese of Fresno
- Roman Catholic Diocese of Gallup
- Roman Catholic Diocese of Great Falls–Billings
- Roman Catholic Diocese of Helena
- Roman Catholic Diocese of Honolulu
- Roman Catholic Diocese of Las Cruces
- Roman Catholic Diocese of Las Vegas
- Roman Catholic Archdiocese of Los Angeles
- Roman Catholic Diocese of Monterey
- Roman Catholic Diocese of Oakland
- Roman Catholic Diocese of Orange
- Roman Catholic Diocese of Phoenix
- Roman Catholic Archdiocese of Portland in Oregon
- Roman Catholic Diocese of Reno
- Roman Catholic Diocese of Sacramento
- Roman Catholic Diocese of Salt Lake City
- Roman Catholic Diocese of San Bernardino
- Roman Catholic Diocese of San Diego
- Roman Catholic Archdiocese of San Francisco
- Roman Catholic Diocese of San Jose
- Roman Catholic Archdiocese of Santa Fe
- Roman Catholic Diocese of Santa Rosa
- Roman Catholic Archdiocese of Seattle
- Roman Catholic Diocese of Spokane
- Roman Catholic Diocese of Stockton
- Roman Catholic Diocese of Tucson
- Roman Catholic Diocese of Yakima

The WCEA is presided over by a bishop or archbishop of a California see—the WCEA was created under the auspices of the California bishops, who maintain certain powers, including the appointment of the president. Day-to-day operations are headed by a lay executive director. Coordination for the accreditation process within each diocese is headed by a commissioner appointed by the diocese.

== See also ==
- History of Catholic education in the United States
