= Querétaro (disambiguation) =

Querétaro is a state in Mexico.

Querétaro may also refer to:

- Querétaro, Querétaro, the capital and largest city in Querétaro
- Querétaro FC, a Mexican football club
- Diocese of Querétaro
- Conspiracy of Querétaro, precursor to the 1810 Battle of Monte de las Cruces in the Mexican War of Independence
- Ejido Querétaro, in Mexicali Municipality, Mexico
