= Manuel D. Moreno =

Roman Catholic bishop (1930–2006)

His Eminence, The Most Reverend Manuel D. Moreno
- Bishop of Tucson
- Church: Roman Catholic Church
- See: Diocese of Tucson
- In office: January 12, 1982 to March 2003
- Predecessor: Francis Joseph Green
- Successor: Gerald F. Kicanas
- Other posts: Auxiliary Bishop of Los Angeles; 1976 to 1982

Orders
- Ordination: April 25, 1961 by James Francis Aloysius McIntyre
- Consecration: February 17, 1977 by Timothy Manning

Personal details
- Born: Manuel Duran Moreno; October 27, 1930 Placentia, California, US
- Died: October 17, 2006 (aged 75) Tucson, Arizona, US
- Education: University of California Los Angeles; Our Lady Queen of Angels Seminary; St. John’s Seminary; North American College
- Motto: Cuento con Christo (I speak with Christ)

Styles of Manuel Moreno
- Reference style: The Most Reverend
- Spoken style: Your Excellency

Manuel Duran Moreno (November 27, 1930 – November 17, 2006) was an American prelate of the Roman Catholic Church. He served as the sixth bishop of Tucson in Arizona from 1982 to 2003. He previously served as an auxiliary bishop of the Archdiocese of Los Angeles in California.

== Biography ==
=== Early life ===
Manuel Moreno was born on November 27, 1930, in Placentia, California, to Antonio and Enedina Moreno. His father worked in the citrus and walnut groves that surrounded Placentia, and young Manuel often worked with him there.

Moreno graduated from Fullerton Junior College in Fullerton, California and the University of California Los Angeles (UCLA) where, in 1953, he received a degree in business administration. While at UCLA, Moreno started thinking about becoming a priest..

After his graduation, Moreno entered Our Lady Queen of Angels Seminary in San Fernando, California. He completed his preparation and studies at St. John’s Seminary in Camarillo, California.

=== Priesthood ===
Moreno was ordained to the priesthood for the Archdiocese of Los Angeles on April 25, 1961 by Cardinal James Francis Aloysius McIntyre. As a new priest, he continued his studies at the graduate division of the Pontifical North American College in Rome and then returned to Los Angeles for his first parish assignment.

=== Auxiliary Bishop of Los Angeles ===
On December 20, 1976, Pope Paul VI named Moreno as an auxiliary bishop of Los Angeles He was consecrated on February 17, 1977, by Cardinal Timothy Manning at Saint Vibiana Cathedral in Los Angeles.

=== Bishop of Tucson ===
On January 12, 1982, Pope John Paul II appointed Moreno as bishop of Tucson. Moreno resigned as bishop of Tucson in March 2003.Moreno died on November 17, 2006, at his Tucson home where he had been receiving hospice care.

Catholic Church titles
Preceded by Francis Joseph Green	Bishop of Tucson; 1960–1981	Succeeded by Gerald F. Kicanas
