= Cathedral of Saint Augustine (Tucson, Arizona) =

St. Augustine Cathedral
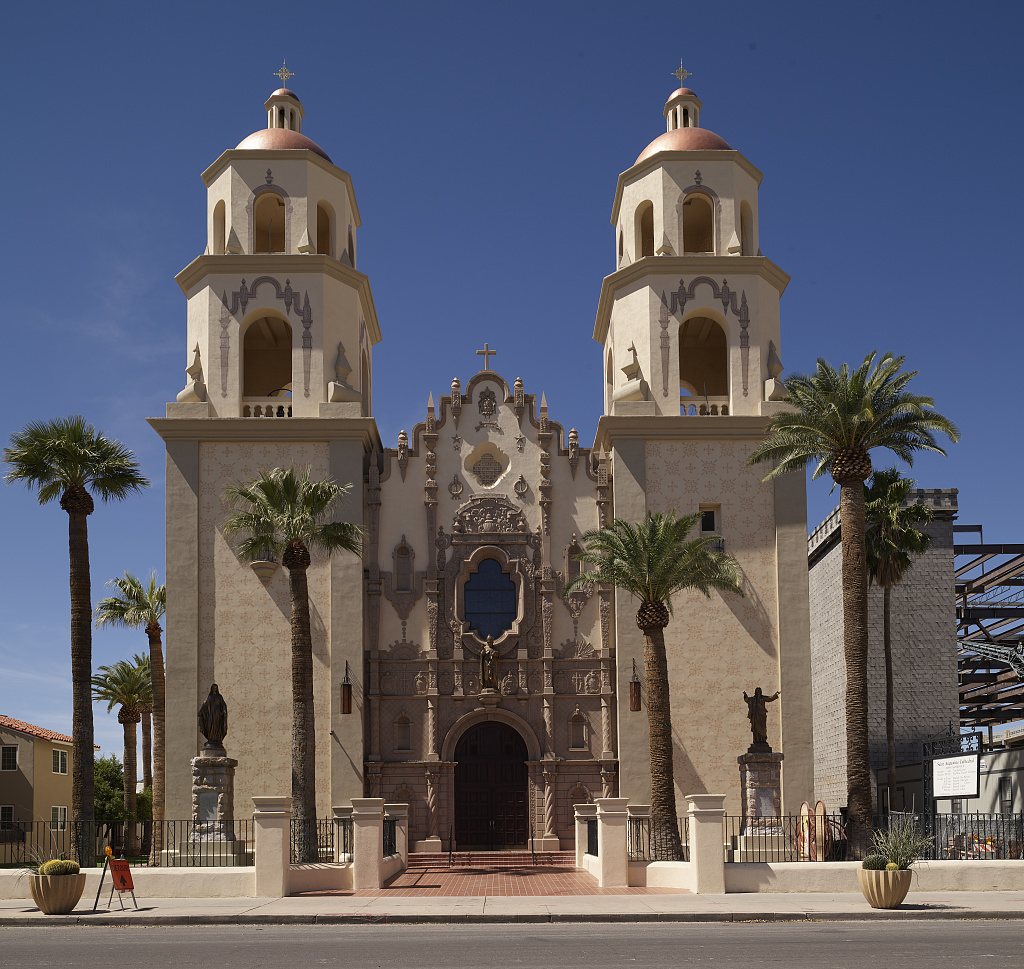

- Location in Arizona St. Augustine Cathedral (the United States)
- 32°13′10″N 110°58′17″W
- Location: 192 S. Stone Avenue; Tucson, Arizona
- Country: United States
- Denomination: Catholic
- Sui iuris church: Latin Church
- Tradition: Roman Rite
- Website: www.augustinecathedral.org

History
- Founded: 1776
- Dedication: Saint Augustine
- Dedicated: 1968

Architecture
- Style: Mexican baroque
- Completed: 1968 (58 years ago)

Specifications
- Capacity: 1,250
- Materials: Brick, cast stone

Administration
- Diocese: Diocese of Tucson

Clergy
- Bishop: Most Rev. James Misko
- Rector: Rev. Alan Valencia

The Cathedral of Saint Augustine (Spanish: Catedral de San Agustín) is the cathedral and mother church of the Catholic Diocese of Tucson. It is located in Tucson, Arizona in the United States.

== History ==
=== St. Augustine Church ===
During the 17th and 18th centuries, all of present-day Arizona was part of the Spanish colony of New Spain. The first catholic presence in the Tucson era was the mission the Mission San Xavier del Bac, founded by Spanish Jesuit priests in 1771. Mission San Xavier is considered the first Catholic parish in Southern Arizona.Four years later, Spanish forces established a presidio, or fort, in what is today the center of Tucson. The chapel at the Presidio San Agustín del Tucson was the first Catholic church in Tucson itself.

After the Mexican War of Independence ended in 1821, Mexico took control of the Spanish colonies in the West. Spain abandoned the presidio in Tucson. The pastor of Mission San Xavier del Bac, the Jesuit priest Rafael Diaz, refused to sign a loyalty oath in 1828 to the new Mexican Government; he was forced to leave the mission and was not replaced.

With the 1854 Gadsden Purchase, Mexico sold Southern Arizona to the United States.The Vatican placed the Catholic population of the area under the Diocese of Santa Fe. In 1858, Bishop Jean-Baptiste Lamy of Santa Fe sent the French priest Joseph Machebeuf to Tucson to assess the Catholic population there. Machebeuf advised Lamy that Tucson had a population of 600 people and should have its own parish and priest.

In 1862 or 1863, Lamy sent the priest Donato Rogieri to Tucson. At the time, it was a small village with no church. After services were over, Donato and his parishioners would pick up adobe bricks and carry them back to the building site of the church. Jean-Baptiste Salpointe, appointed as pastor of Tucscon in 1866, finished St. Augustine Church in 1868.

=== Cathedral of St. Augustine ===
Later in 1868, Pope Pius IX erected the Vicariate Apostolic of Arizona and named Salpointe as the vicar apostolic. St. Augustine Church became the Cathedral of St. AugustinePope Leo XIII in 1897 converted the Vicariate Apostolic of Arizona into the Diocese of Arizona with Peter Bourgade named as its first bishop. That same year, he constructed a new cathedral made of brick. The original plans specified a Gothic structure, but the diocese never added the spires.

The diocese in 1928 added the cast stone façade to the Cathedral of St. Augustine. The intent was to achieve a Mexican baroque form, similar to that of the Querétaro Cathedral in Querétaro, Mexico.The diocese in 1966 gutted and rebuilt the interior of the cathedral, completing the project in 1968.

In 2010, the cathedral underwent a major renovation. The diocese updated the lighting and sound technology, redesigned the pews and revamped the tile flooring. On the outside, the sanctuary's white walls were recovered in beige. The statues of the Immaculate Conception and the Sacred Heart of Jesus were restored. The project took over two years and cost over $1 milion. Bishop Gerald Kicanas rededicated the cathedral on February 12, 2011.

Thieves in 2012 stole six air conditioning units from buildings on the cathedral campus, along with some brass door handles. The diocese in 2016 constructed a four-story conference hall and office building on the cathedral campus. At the same time, the artwork in the Our Lady's Chapel was being restored. In 2020, a man was arrested for throwing rocks at the cathedral, damaging six stained glass windows.

== Cathedral exterior ==
The cathedral features an elaborate cast stone façade with the coat of arms of Pope Pius XI. Indigenous desert plants are featured in the stone designs, such as yucca and saguaro blossoms. The stone displays a representation of the Mission San Xavier del Bac.

=== Cathedral interior ===
A large crucifix is installed on the back wall of the sanctuary. It was carved during the 12th- or 13th-century in Pamplona, Spain and gifted to the cathedral in 1981. The crucifix is 17 ft (5.2 m) tall and weighs 2,000 lb (910 kg).

The upper levels of stained glass in the nave display the 12 apostles and the first four bishops of Tucson. The lower level of stained glass depicts the history of Augustine of Hippo. The side altars, also known as retablos, are made of handcrafted wood and decorated to honor the Blessed Sacrament Chapel and Our Lady of Guadalupe Shrine.

The cathedral's floor is set on a slight grade, placing the main altar in clear view of the entire congregation. The cathedral can accommodate up to 1,250 people. The pipe organ was designed and built by David McDowell in Tucson and has thirty-eight ranks.

== Gallery ==
Cathedral images

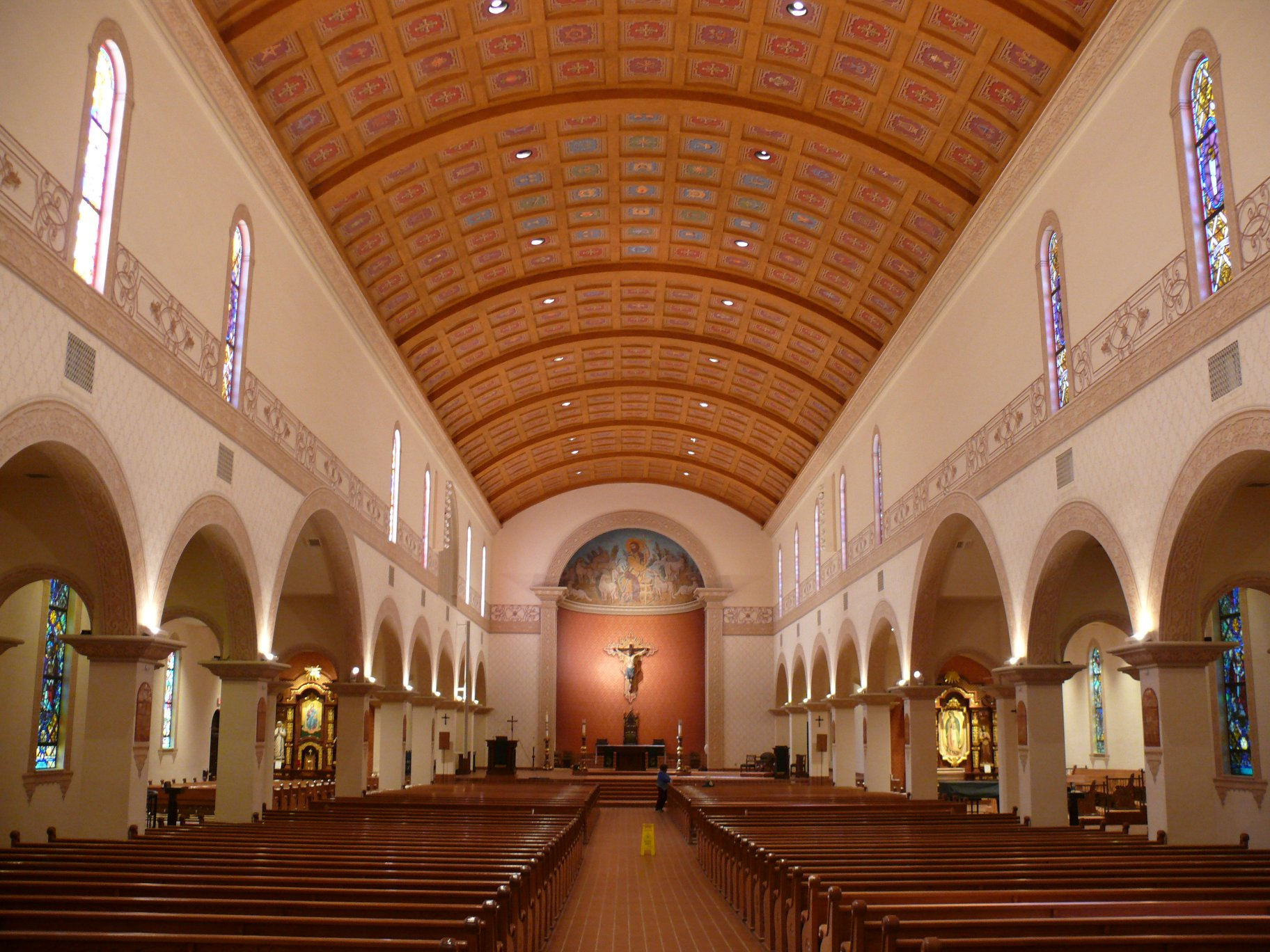
Nave (2013)

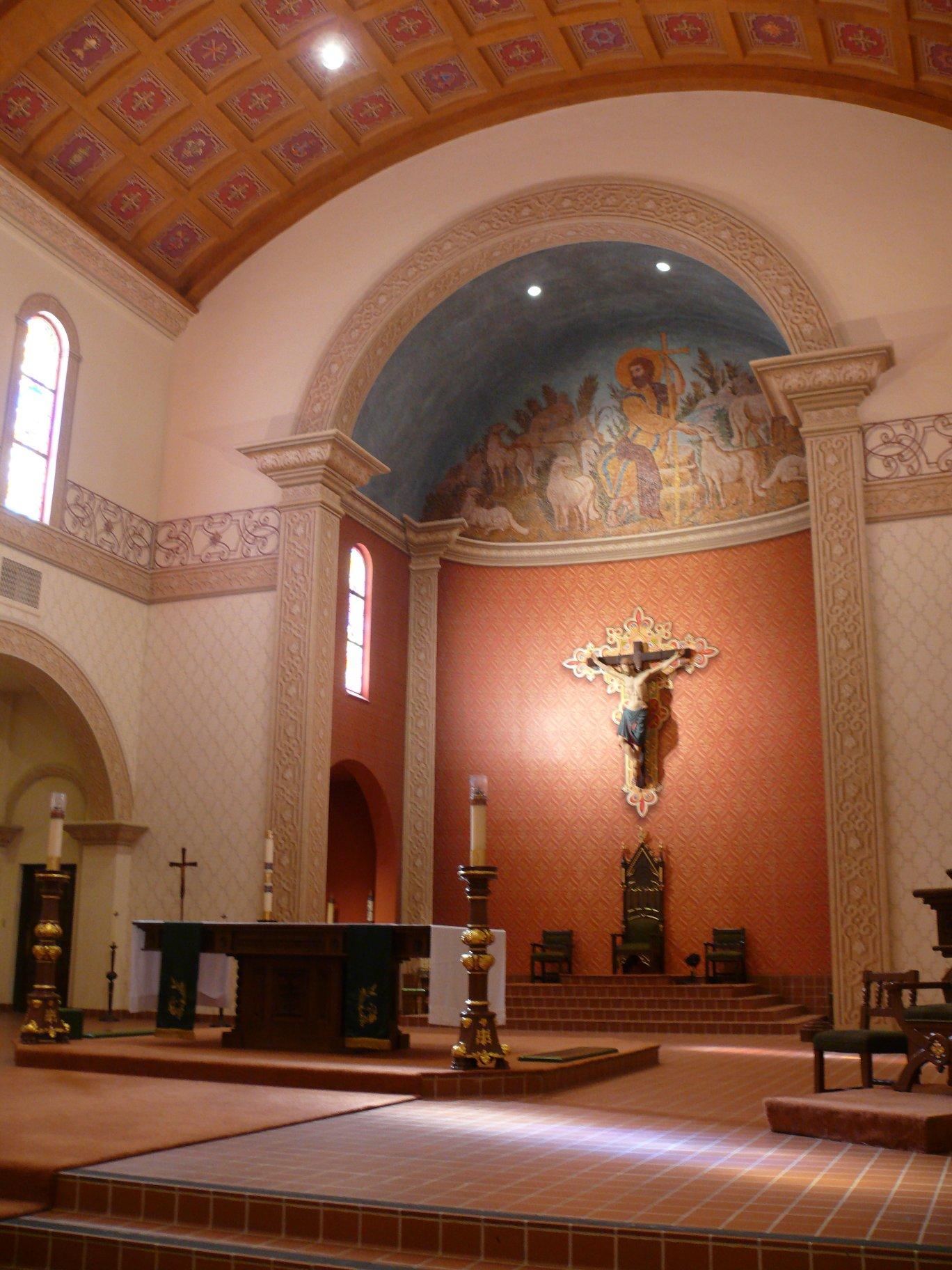
Chancel (2013)

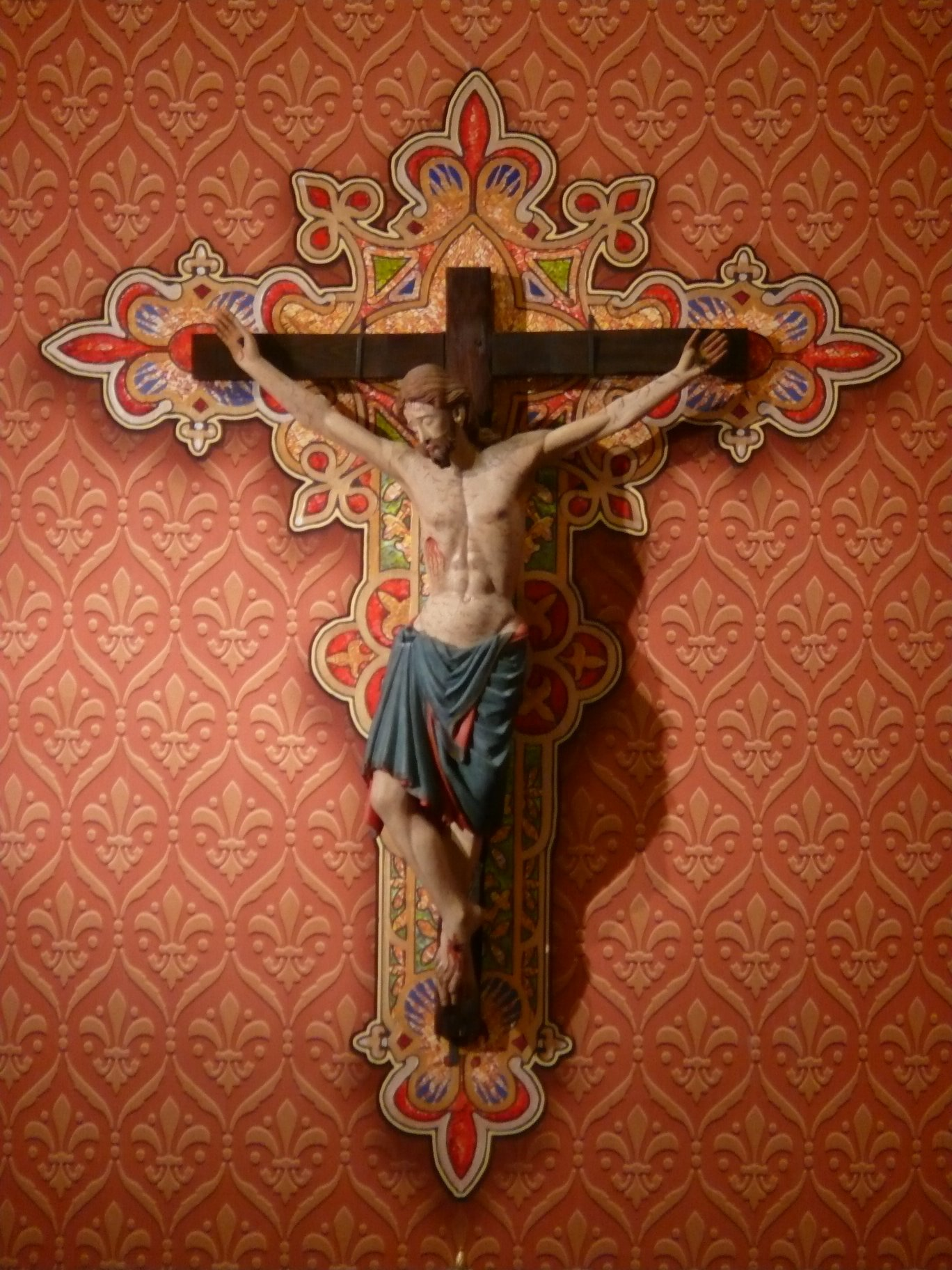
Crucifix from Pamplona (2013)

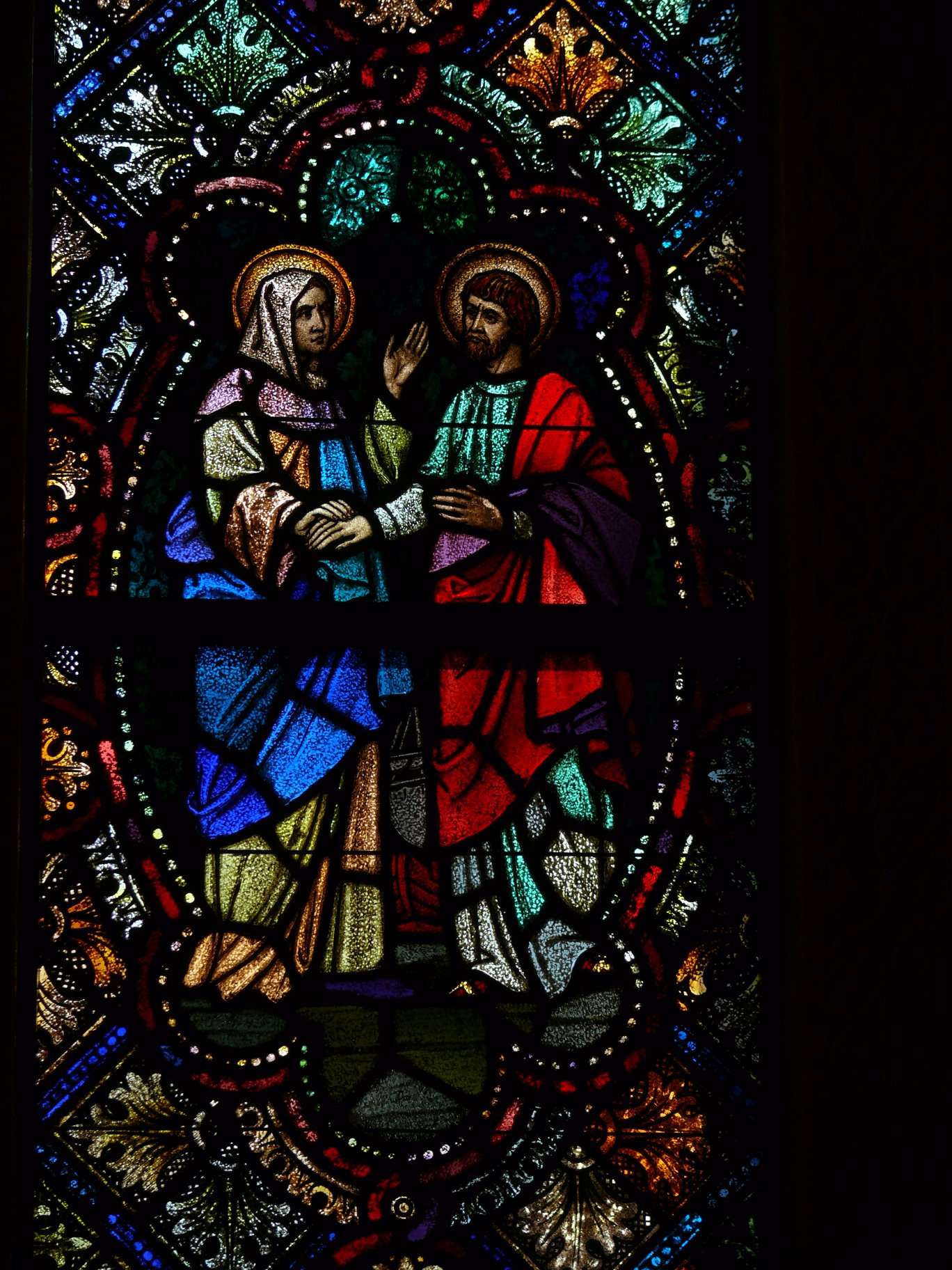
Stained glass window (2013)

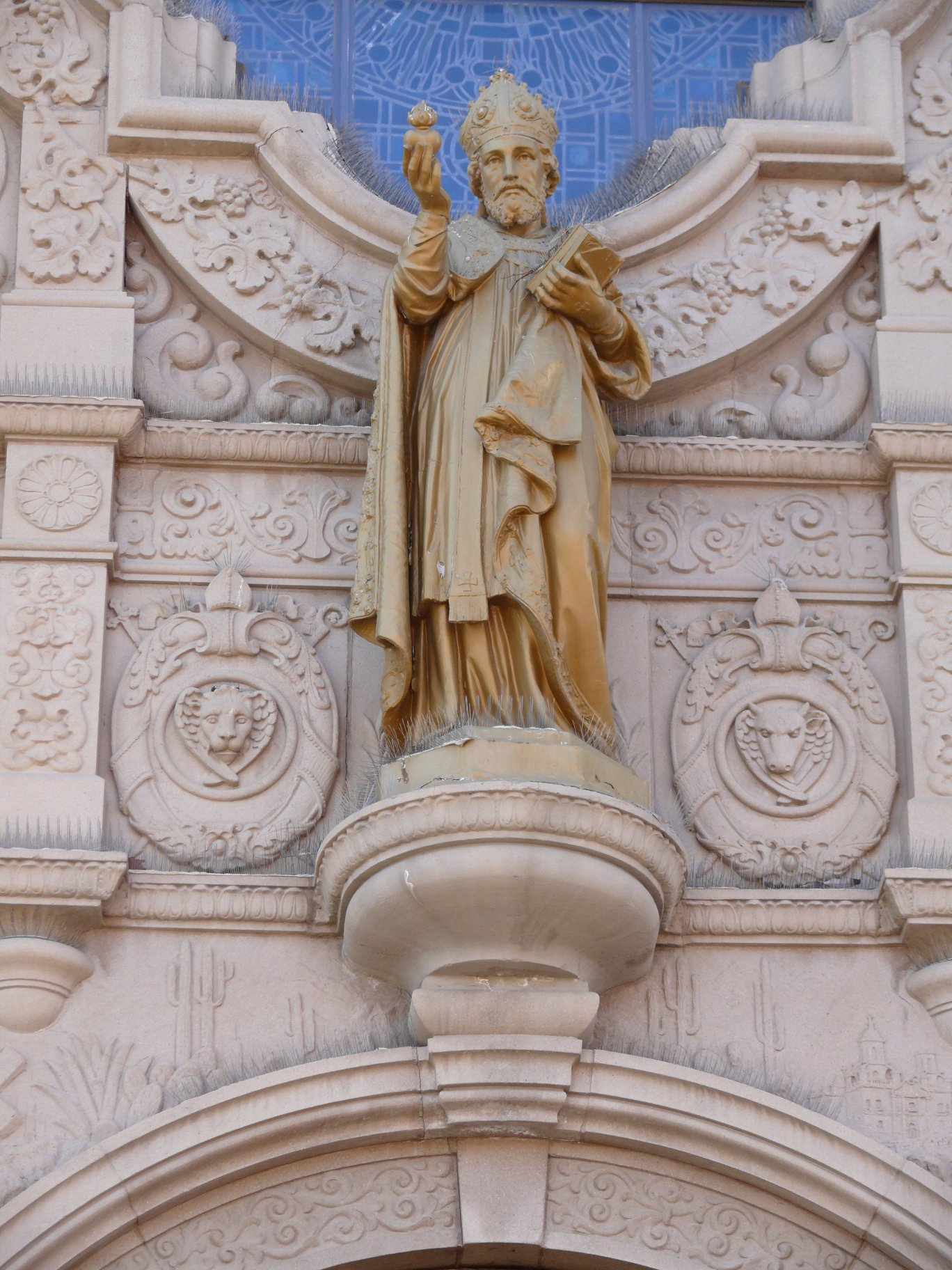
Statue of Augustine of Hippo (2013)

== See also ==
- List of Catholic cathedrals in the United States
- List of cathedrals in the United States
