= Edward N. Peters =

American Catholic canonist

- Born: Edward Neal Peters; 1957 (age 68–69); St. Louis, Missouri, US
- Education: Saint Louis University; University of Missouri; Catholic University of America
- Occupation: Canonist
- Website: canonlaw.info

Edward Neal Peters (born 1957) is an American Catholic canonist and serves as a referendary of the Apostolic Signatura (an advisor/consultant to the Holy See's top tribunal). He was professor of canon law at the Sacred Heart Major Seminary of the Archdiocese of Detroit from 2005 until 2025, when Archbishop Edward Weisenburger dismissed him.

== Early life and education ==
Peters was born in 1957 and raised in St. Louis, Missouri, where he attended the Chaminade College Preparatory School from 1970 to 1975. He attended Saint Louis University, majoring in political science, graduating in 1979. He earned his Juris Doctor degree from University of Missouri-Columbia School of Law in 1982, during the third year of which he was a teaching assistant in the Legal Research and Writing Program for Tate Hall. After graduation, Peters was admitted to the Missouri Bar Association.

== Professional career ==
In 1988, Peters earned his Licentiate of Canon Law degree from the Catholic University of America School of Canon Law and was named Quasten Fellow for doctoral studies there, completing doctoral course work in 1990, and defending his doctoral dissertation, Penal Procedural Law in the 1983 Code of Canon Law, in August 1991.

Over the next twelve years, Peters served as director of the Office for Canonical Affairs, vice-chancellor and chancellor, Defender of the Bond, and collegial judge for diocesan and appellate tribunals for the dioceses of Duluth and San Diego. From May 2001, Peters taught at the (Graduate) Institute for Pastoral Theology in Ann Arbor, Michigan. In 2005, he was appointed to the Cardinal Szoka Chair of Canon Law at Sacred Heart Major Seminary in Detroit. In 2010, he was named a referendary of the Supreme Tribunal of the Apostolic Signatura by Pope Benedict XVI, a consultant, becoming the first layman appointed to that post since the re-establishment of the Signatura early in the 20th century. In 2012, the Vatican named him as an expert consultant to the Synod of Bishops on the New Evangelization.

== Works ==
- 1988: Home Schooling & the New Code of Canon Law (Brownson studies)
- 1992: Penal Procedural Law in the 1983 Code of Canon Law
- 1997: 100 Answers to Your Questions on Annulments (a Basilica Press "Modern Apologetics" Book)
- 2000: Tabulae congruentiae inter Codicem iuris canonici et versiones anteriores canonum
- 2001: The 1917 or Pio-Benedictine Code of Canon Law: in English Translation with Extensive Scholarly Apparatus
- 2004: Annulments and the Catholic Church
- 2005: Incrementa in progressu 1983 Codicis iuris canonici
- 2006: Excommunication and the Catholic Church
- 2008: A Modern Guide to Indulgences
- 2017: The 1917 or Pio-Benedictine Code of Canon Law: in English Translation with Extensive Scholarly Apparatus

== Personal life ==
Peters is married to Angela and they have six children. They enjoy chess, astronomy and classic cinema.
