= Daniel James Gercke =

American prelate

His Excellency, The Most Reverend Daniel James Gercke
- Bishop of Tucson; Titular Archbishop of Cotyaeum
- Appointed: June 21, 1923
- Installed: June 21, 1923
- Term ended: September 28, 1960
- Predecessor: Henry Regis Granjon
- Successor: Francis Joseph Green

Orders
- Ordination: June 1, 1901 by Patrick John Ryan
- Consecration: November 6, 1924 by Dennis Joseph Dougherty

Personal details
- Born: October 9, 1874 Philadelphia, Pennsylvania, US
- Died: March 19, 1964 (aged 89)
- Denomination: Roman Catholic
- Parents: Christopher and Catherine (née Shea) Gercke
- Education: St. Charles Borromeo Seminary; St. Joseph's College, Philadelphia
- Motto: Omnia pro Jesu (All for Jesus)

Daniel James Gercke (October 9, 1874 – March 19, 1964) was an American Catholic prelate who served as bishop of Tucson in Arizona from 1923 to 1960. He was named as a titular archbishop in 1960.

== Biography ==
=== Early life ===
Daniel Gercke was born on October 9, 1874, in the Holmesburg section of Philadelphia, Pennsylvania, to Christopher and Catherine (née Shea) Gercke. He attended St. Joseph's College in Philadelphia, from where he obtained a Bachelor of Arts degree in 1891. He completed his theological studies at St. Charles Borromeo Seminary in Philadelphia.

=== Priesthood ===
Gercke was ordained to the priesthood for the Archdiocese of Philadelphia by Archbishop Patrick Ryan on June 1, 1901. He then served as a curate at St. Joseph's Parish in Girardville, Pennsylvania, and afterwards at Holy Trinity Parish in Philadelphia. He briefly served at St. Mary's Parish in Philadelphia before going to Vigan City, Philippines, in 1903. He served as vicar general of the Diocese of Nueva Cáceres in the Philippines from 1910 to 1919.

Gercke was named a domestic prelate by Pope Benedict XV in 1915, and returned to Philadelphia in 1919. He then served as rector of the Cathedral of SS. Peter and Paul.

=== Bishop of Tucson ===
On June 21, 1923, Gercke was appointed the third bishop of Tucson by Pope Pius XI. He received his episcopal consecration on November 6, 1923, from Cardinal Dennis Dougherty, with Bishops John MacGinley and James Paul McCloskey serving as co-consecrators.

=== Retirement and legacy ===
On September 28, 1960, Pope Paul VI accepted Gercke's resignation as bishop of Tucson and named him as titular archbishop of Cotyaeum on the same date. Daniel Gercke died on March 19, 1964, at age 89.

Catholic Church titles
Preceded by Henry Regis Granjon	Bishop of Tucson; 1923–1960	Succeeded by Francis Joseph Green
