= Stella Maris Church, Cayman Brac =

Stella Maris Church
- Stella Maris Church
- 19°42′07″N 79°51′36″W
- Location: Cayman Brac
- Country: Cayman Islands
- Denomination: Catholic
- Sui iuris church: Latin Church
- Tradition: Roman Rite
- Website: Official website

Architecture
- Completed: 2011
- Construction cost: $800,000 U.S.

Administration
- Archdiocese: Archdiocese of Detroit

The Stella Maris Church is a Catholic church that is located in Alta Vista Drive on the island of Cayman Brac about 143 kilometers from the main island of the Cayman Islands, a British overseas territory in the Caribbean Sea.

== History ==
The idea of a Catholic church being established on Cayman Brac came about after a former pastor of St. Ignatius Church, George Town and Monseigneur retired to the island in the 1980s and noticed there was nowhere for Catholics to worship. Whilst they gathered funding to build Stella Maris Church, they worshipped in the cottage of one of the congregants which continued to be used as a temporary chapel after his death in 2003.

Its building was built at cost of approximately $800,000. and is the first Catholic church on the island of Cayman Brac. The building was blessed and opened for religious services on 5 February 2011 with the presence of Archbishop Allen Vigneron, the Archbishop of Detroit in the United States who is the Superior of the Mission "Sui Iuris" of Cayman Islands. The opening was also attended by the Deputy Premier of the Cayman Islands. The church is a part of the Archdiocese of Detroit. This arrangement came about when Pope John Paul II ordered that a number of American dioceses would oversee parishes within the Caribbean. The church has no resident priest with Mass usually only being said once a month due to visiting priests from Grand Cayman.

== Worship ==
The St. Ignatius Church, George Town is the parent church to this one and is the only other Catholic church in the Cayman Islands. The church follows the Roman or Latin rite and is part of the jurisdiction of the mission sui iuris of the Cayman Islands (missio sui iuris insularum Cayanensium).

== See also ==
- Catholic Church in the United Kingdom
- Stella Maris (disambiguation)
