= James Misko =

American Catholic prelate (born 1970)

His Excellency, The Most Reverend James Misko
- Bishop of Tucson
- Diocese: Tucson
- Appointed: December 22, 2025
- Installed: February 20, 2026
- Predecessor: Edward Weisenburger
- Previous post: Administrator of Diocese of Austin (2025)

Orders
- Ordination: June 9, 2007 by Gregory Michael Aymond
- Consecration: February 20, 2026 by John Charles Wester, Joe S. Vásquez, and Daniel E. Garcia

Personal details
- Born: James Albert Misko; June 18, 1970 (age 56) Los Angeles, California
- Motto: Domine, Tuus sum ego (Latin for 'Lord, I am Yours')
- Styles
- Reference style: His Excellency; The Most Reverend
- Spoken style: Your Excellency
- Religious style: Bishop

James Albert Misko (born June 18, 1970) is an American Catholic prelate who serves as bishop for the Diocese of Tucson.

== Biography ==
On June 9, 2007, Misko was ordained to the priesthood by Gregory Aymond for the Diocese of Austin.

=== Episcopal career ===
Pope Leo XIV appointed Misko bishop for the Diocese of Tucson on December 22, 2025. On February 20, 2026, Misko was consecrated as a bishop and installed as the new bishop of the Diocese of Tucson.

== See also ==
- Catholic Church in the United States
- Hierarchy of the Catholic Church
- Historical list of the Catholic bishops of the United States
- List of Catholic bishops in the United States
- Lists of popes, patriarchs, primates, archbishops, and bishops

Catholic Church titles
Preceded by Edward Weisenburger	Bishop of Tucson; 2026‍–‍present	Succeeded by Incumbent
