= Saint Anthony's Church (Casa Grande, Arizona) =

Historic church in Arizona, United States

- Saint Anthony's Church and Rectory
- U.S. National Register of Historic Places
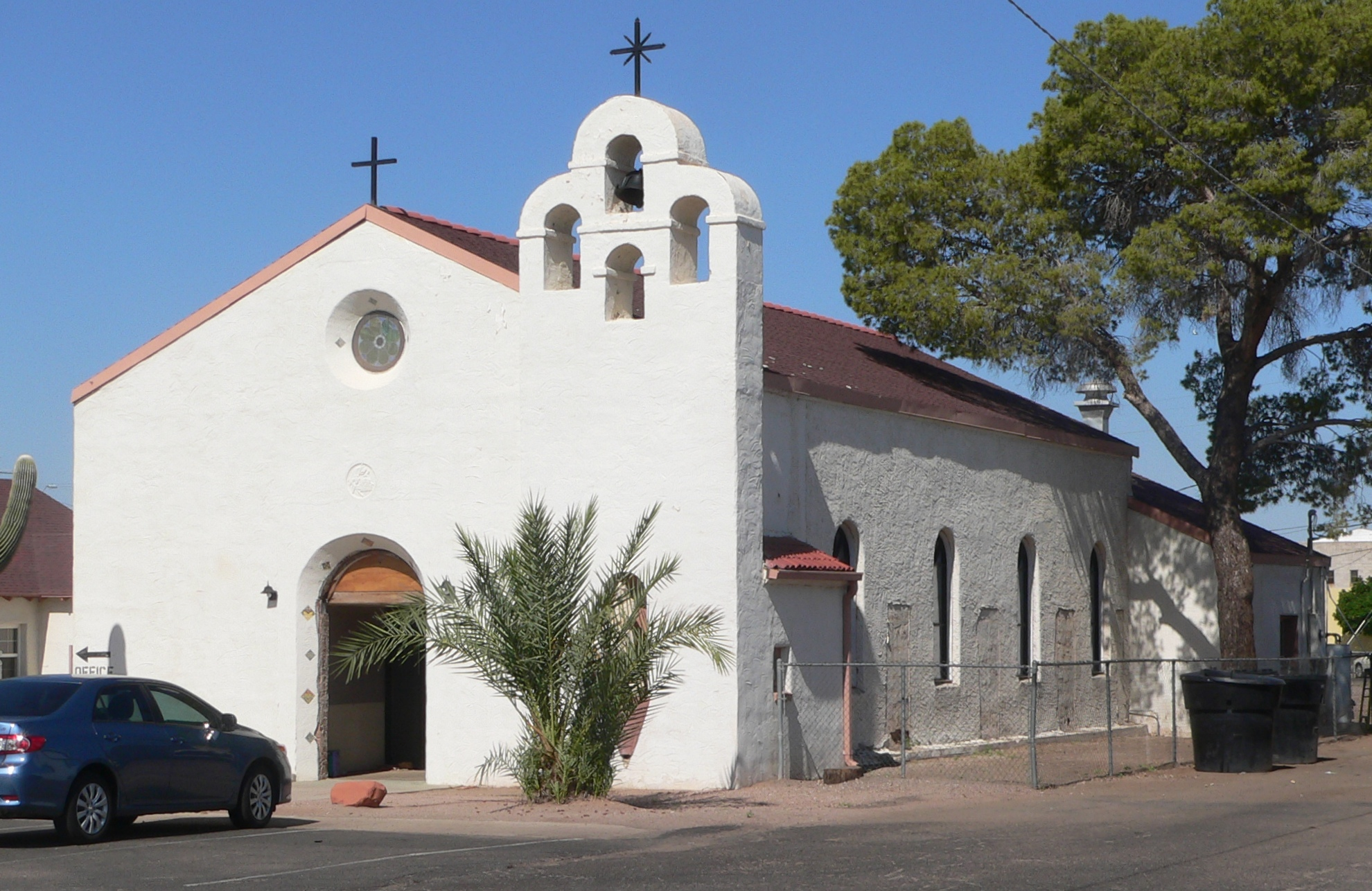
- St. Anthony's Church

- Location within Arizona Location within the United States
- Location: 215 N. Picacho, Casa Grande, Arizona
- Coordinates: 32°52′32.8″N 111°45′9.2″W
- Area: less than one acre
- Built: 1935, 1936
- Architectural style: Spanish Colonial Revival
- MPS: Casa Grande MRA
- NRHP reference No.: 85000892
- Added to NRHP: April 16, 1985

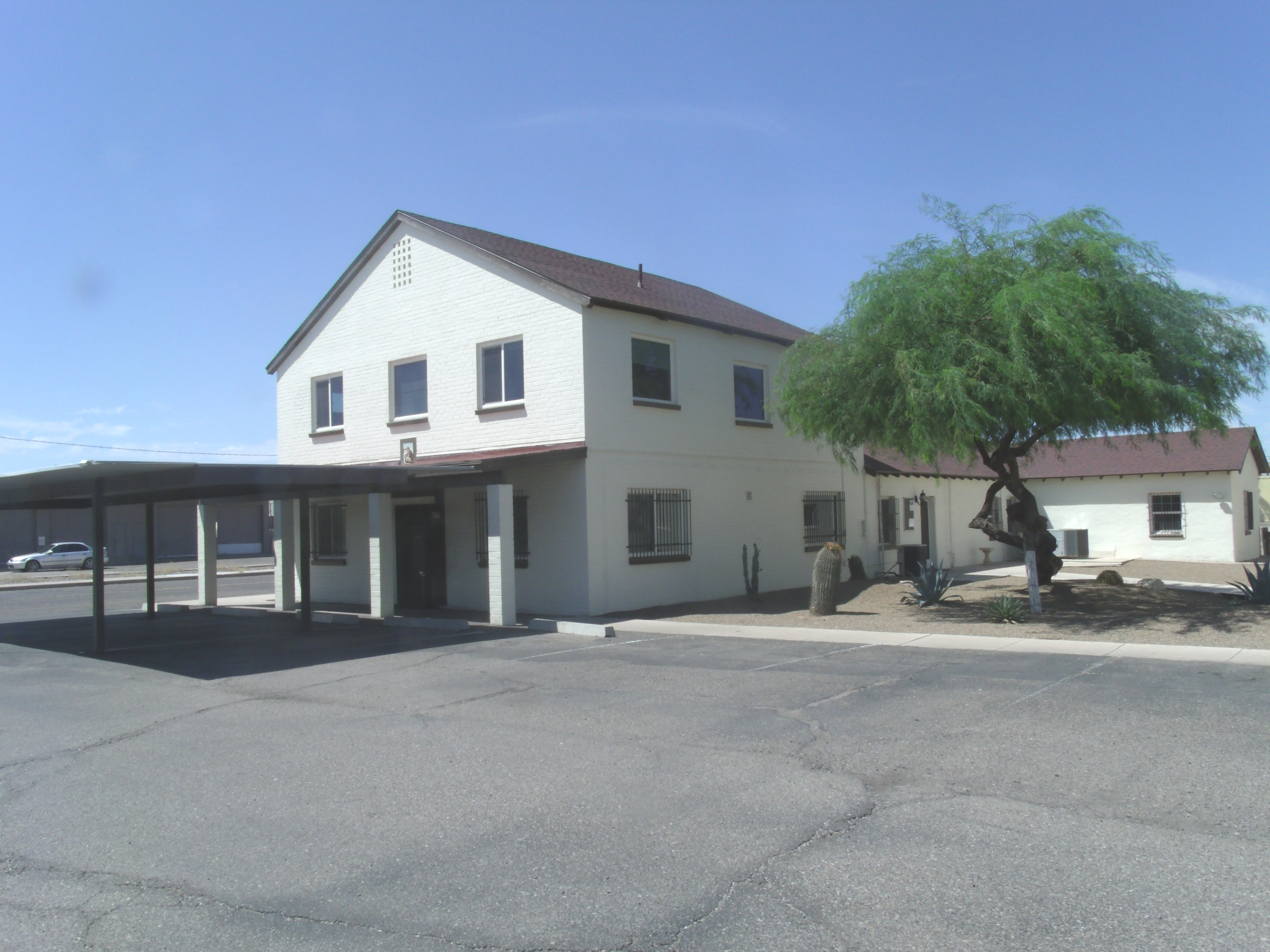
Saint Anthony's Church Rectory

Saint Anthony's Church is a Roman Catholic religious complex on Picacho Street in Casa Grande, Arizona. The church, along with the associated rectory, was listed in the National Register of Historic Places in 1985.

The church is built of adobe covered with stucco and has Spanish Colonial Revival influence. It was built in 1935. The north corner of its front facade has a bell tower surmounted by a small cross.

The rectory was built in 1936, and also is of Spanish Colonial Revival influence. Its interior has a large 16 by 31 feet (4.9 m × 9.4 m) open beamed ceiling.

The church or the rectory is also known as Murphy Hall.

== See also ==
- List of historic properties in Casa Grande, Arizona
