= Querétaro Cathedral =

Coordinates: 20°35′29.051″N 100°23′47.872″W

St. Philip Neri Cathedral
- Catedral de San Felipe Neri
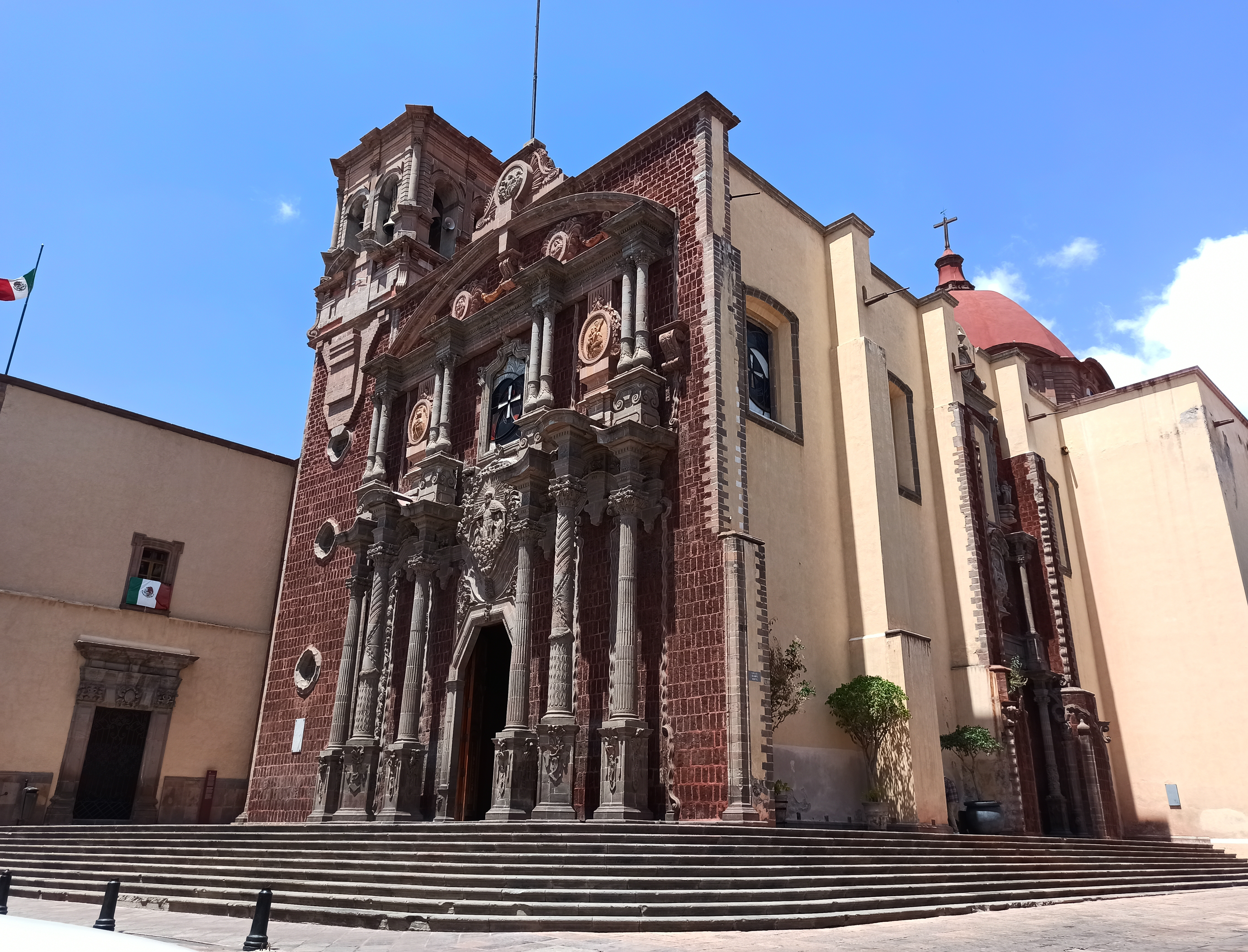
- St. Philip Neri Cathedral
- Location: Querétaro
- Country: Mexico
- Denomination: Roman Catholic Church

The St. Philip Neri Cathedral, (Spanish: Catedral de San Felipe Neri) also Querétaro Cathedral, is a Catholic church that was built by the Oratory of Saint Philip Neri. It is located in the center of the city of Santiago de Querétaro in Mexico.

The building was erected between 1786 and 1804, by the Order of San Felipe Neri, at the request of Father Martin de San Cayetano. He was blessed by Father Miguel Hidalgo, on September 19, 1805. Abandoned by the order of the place, the bishop and historian Francisco Banegas y Galván asked the Holy See to donate the temple for the creation of the cathedral and the seminary, which was authorized and in 1921 the temple was declared a cathedral by Pope Benedict XV, being consecrated in 1931.

One of the last works built during the colonial period, which is a sign of the transition between two styles: from Baroque to Neoclassical. It occupies the finishing of the exterior material of quarry and tezontle.

== See also ==
- Roman Catholic Diocese of Querétaro
- Roman Catholicism in Mexico
- St. Philip Neri
