= St. Ignatius Church, George Town =

St. Ignatius Church
- St. Ignatius Church
- 19°16′36″N 81°23′12″W
- Location: George Town
- Country: Cayman Islands; United Kingdom
- Denomination: Roman Catholic Church

St. Ignatius Church is a religious building affiliated with the Catholic Church. It is on Walkers Road in the city of George Town on Grand Cayman Island in the British overseas territory of the Cayman Islands in the Caribbean Sea.

The temple follows the Roman or Latin rite and is under the jurisdiction of the mission sui iuris of the Cayman Islands (Missio sui iuris insularum Caimanensium) that was created in 2000 under the pontificate of Pope John Paul II.

The church in Shedden Road was completed in 1959. In 1971 the School of St. Ignatius linked to the temple was created. In 1981 the building in Walkers Road was started, which it would be completed the following year.

Stella Maris Church, Cayman Brac, is the one other Roman Catholic church in this parish and in the Cayman Islands as a whole, and was created with the move of a priest from this church.

== See also ==
- Roman Catholicism in the United Kingdom
