= Our Lady Queen of Angels Seminary =

Location
- Los Angeles, California; United States; 34.2747°N 118.4603°W

Information
- Type: Minor seminary
- Religious affiliation: Catholic Church
- Opened: 1953
- Closed: 1995

Our Lady Queen of Angels Seminary (OLQA) was the minor seminary for the Archdiocese of Los Angeles from the school's founding in 1953 until its closure in 1995. It was located in Mission Hills, California, adjacent to Mission San Fernando Rey de España. The Vincentian Fathers were primarily responsible for staffing the school until 1973, when it was staffed by priests of the archdiocese.

== History ==
=== Early years (1953-1963) ===
The campus was opened in 1953 as the successor to Los Angeles College (see Daniel Murphy High School). The school, which operated as a boarding school, offered 6 years of study, (four years of high school, two years of college) at which point graduates matriculated to St. John’s Seminary. In 1961, with the opening of the four-year St. John’s Seminary College in Camarillo, California, OLQA became a four-year high school institution.

=== Expansion and contraction (1963–1972) ===
Following a steady increase in students in the late 1950s and the resulting overcrowding, OLQA engaged in an ambitious expansion program, opening a second, adjacent campus in 1964 that effectively doubled the size of the school. The new campus contained eight dormitories; six class rooms, a separate chapel and a recreation room. With this addition, the original campus became known as the West Side, the new campus as the East Side. Although the overcrowding problem was solved, the school soon suffered a steep decline in the number of students, a reflection of national seminary trends following the Second Vatican Council. As a result, the East Side was last used as a separate campus in the 1967-1968 school year. Its use as classroom space continued until the 1970-1971 school year when it was closed. At the present time, the former East Side campus is used as the Administrative Office of the San Fernando pastoral region of the Los Angeles Archdiocese and as a preschool.

=== 1973 to closure ===
With the departure of the Vincentian Fathers, OLQA entered a new era under the administration of diocesan priests appointed by the Cardinal Archbishop. During these years, Spanish replaced Latin in the curriculum by the late 1970s, and there were increased opportunities for off-campus community service. The athletics program was expanded with intramural competition for the first time in the school’s history. This era also saw a dramatic increase in minority enrollment that truly reflected the multicultural diversity of the Archdiocese of Los Angeles. After the establishment of the Diocese of Orange in 1976, the school served students from that diocese.

By the 1994-1995 class, enrollment was down to 150 students and the campus was being shared with nearby Alemany High School, whose campus had been damaged in the Northridge earthquake. Due to the decline in enrollment, the lack of students advancing to the priesthood, and the increasing financial pressure on the archdiocese, the decision was made to close the campus, effective July 1, 1995.

Following closure, the western school campus became the home of Bishop Alemany High School, whose campus was severely damaged in the 1994 Northridge earthquake.

== Rectors of OLQA (partial list) ==
- Fr. Victor E. Roden, CM
- Fr. James P. Graham, CM
- Fr. William J. Mahoney, CM
- Fr. Raymond Ross, CM
- Fr. Walter Housey, CM
- Msgr. John J. Reilly
- Msgr. Joseph J. Cokus
- Fr. Alfred Burnham
- Fr. Richard Martini
- Fr. James Anguiano

== Notable alumni ==
- Bishop George Patrick Ziemann
- G.C. Dilsaver
- Cardinal William Levada
- Cardinal Roger Mahony
- Cardinal Justin Francis Rigali
- Bishop Stephen Blaire
- Bishop Jaime Soto
- Bishop Edward Clark
- George Kunz (Offensive Lineman: Notre Dame; Atlanta Falcons; Baltimore Colts)
- Bill Reid (Center: Stanford; Southern California Sun, San Francisco 49ers)

== In film and television ==
Due to its mission style architecture and manicured grounds, OLQA and the adjacent San Fernando Mission were popular locations in several television and movie productions:

=== Film ===
- Over Silent Paths (1919)
- Yours, Mine and Ours (1968)
- Pee-wee's Big Adventure (1985)
- La Bamba (1987)

=== Television ===
Have gun will travel tv series 1960 starring Richard Boone

- Rescue 8
- I Spy
- Dragnet 1967—Excerpt from Season 1: The Christmas Story
- The Incredible Hulk
- Falcon Crest
- Knight Rider
- Remington Steele
