= Diocese of Tucson =

Diocese of the Catholic Church

Coordinates: 32°13′10″N 110°58′15″W

Diocese of Tucson Dioecesis Tucsonensis Diócesis de Tucson
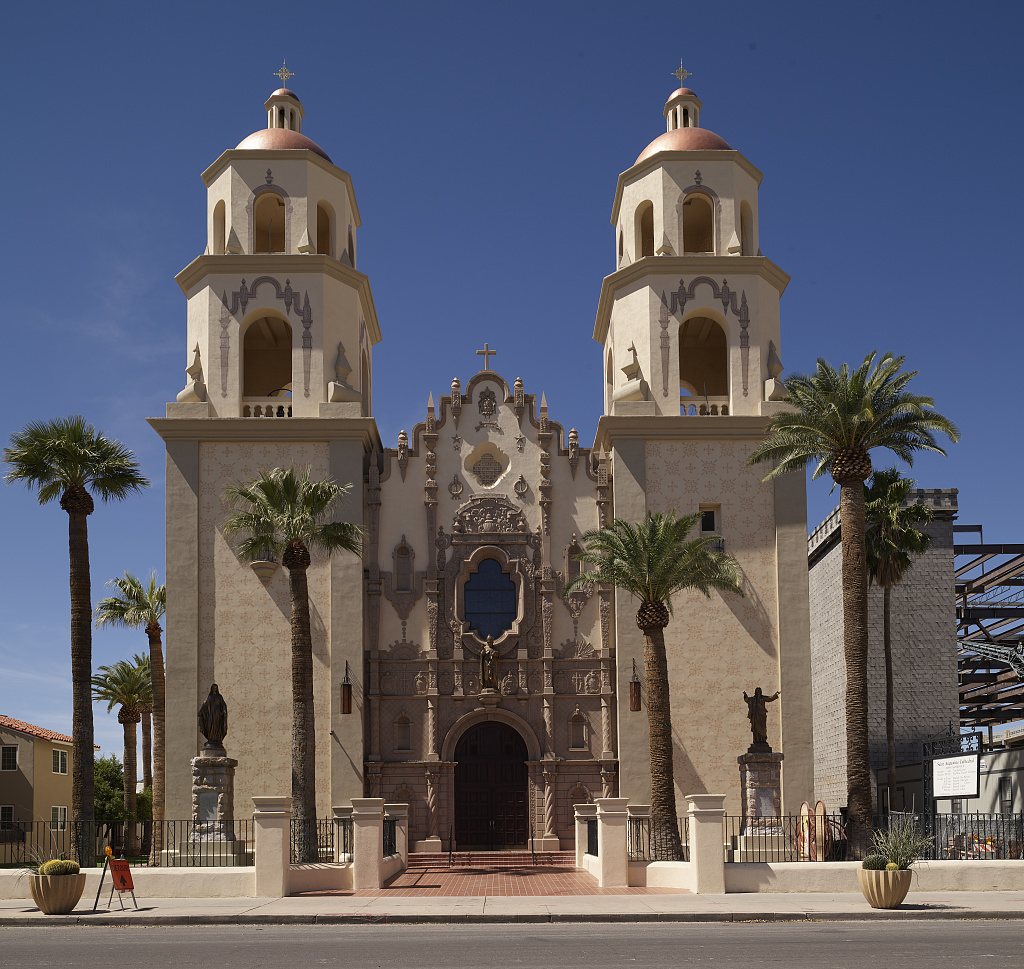
- St. Augustine Cathedral

- Coat of arms

Location
- Country: United States
- Territory: Gila, Graham, Greenlee, Pinal (excluding the territorial boundaries of the Gila River Indian Reservation), Cochise, Santa Cruz, Pima, Yuma, and La Paz in Arizona
- Ecclesiastical province: Santa Fe

Statistics
- Area: 42,707 sq mi (110,610 km^{2})
- Population: Total; Catholics: (as of 2010); 1,689,676; 382,123 (22.6%)
- Parishes: 77
- Schools: 22

Information
- Denomination: Catholic
- Sui iuris church: Latin Church
- Rite: Roman Rite
- Established: May 8, 1897 (129 years ago)
- Cathedral: St. Augustine Cathedral
- Patron saint: Augustine of Hippo

Current leadership
- Pope: Leo XIV
- Bishop: James Misko
- Metropolitan Archbishop: John Charles Wester
- Bishops emeritus: Gerald Frederick Kicanas

Map
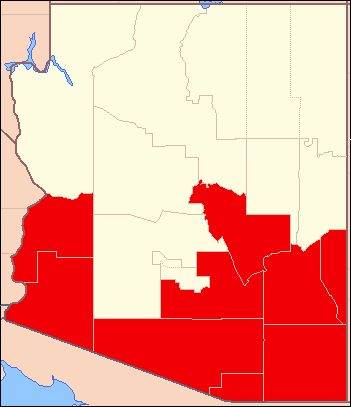

Website
- diocesetucson.org

The Diocese of Tucson (Latin: Dioecesis Tucsonensis – Spanish: Diócesis de Tucson) is a diocese of the Roman Catholic Church in Southern Arizona in the United States. It is a suffragan diocese of the Archdiocese of Santa Fe. The mother church is St. Augustine Cathedral in Tucson.

== Territory ==
The Diocese of Tucson is the fifth largest diocese in geography in the continental United States. It comprises nine counties: Gila, Graham, Greenlee, Pinal, Cochise, Santa Cruz, Pima, Yuma, and La Paz. The Gila River Indian Community, although located in Pinal County, is part of the Diocese of Phoenix.

== History ==
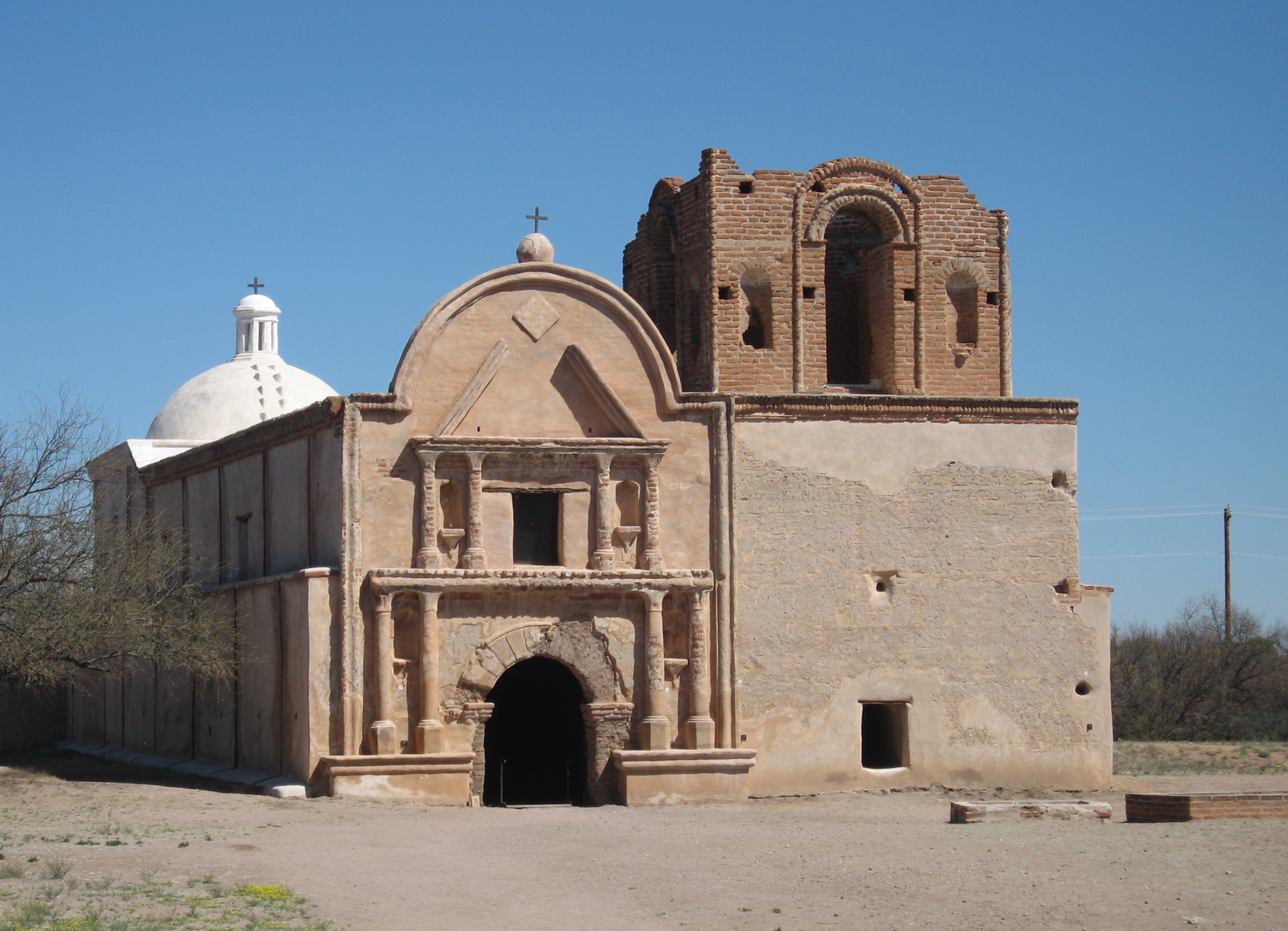
Mission San José de Tumacácori, Nogales, Arizona (2008)

=== 1650 to 1850 ===
During the 17th and 18th centuries, all of present-day Arizona was part of the Spanish colony of New Spain. The first Catholic presence in southern Arizona was the Mission San José de Tumacácori near Nogales, founded in 1691. It was established by Eusebio Kino, a Jesuit missionary, to minister to the Sobaipuri Native Americans. This was part of a string of missions Kino founded in the northern desert regions of New Spain. The next year, Kino built the Mission San Xavier del Bac on the present-day San Xavier Indian Reservation, which is within the Tucson metropolitan area. Mission San Xavier is considered the first Catholic parish in Tucson.

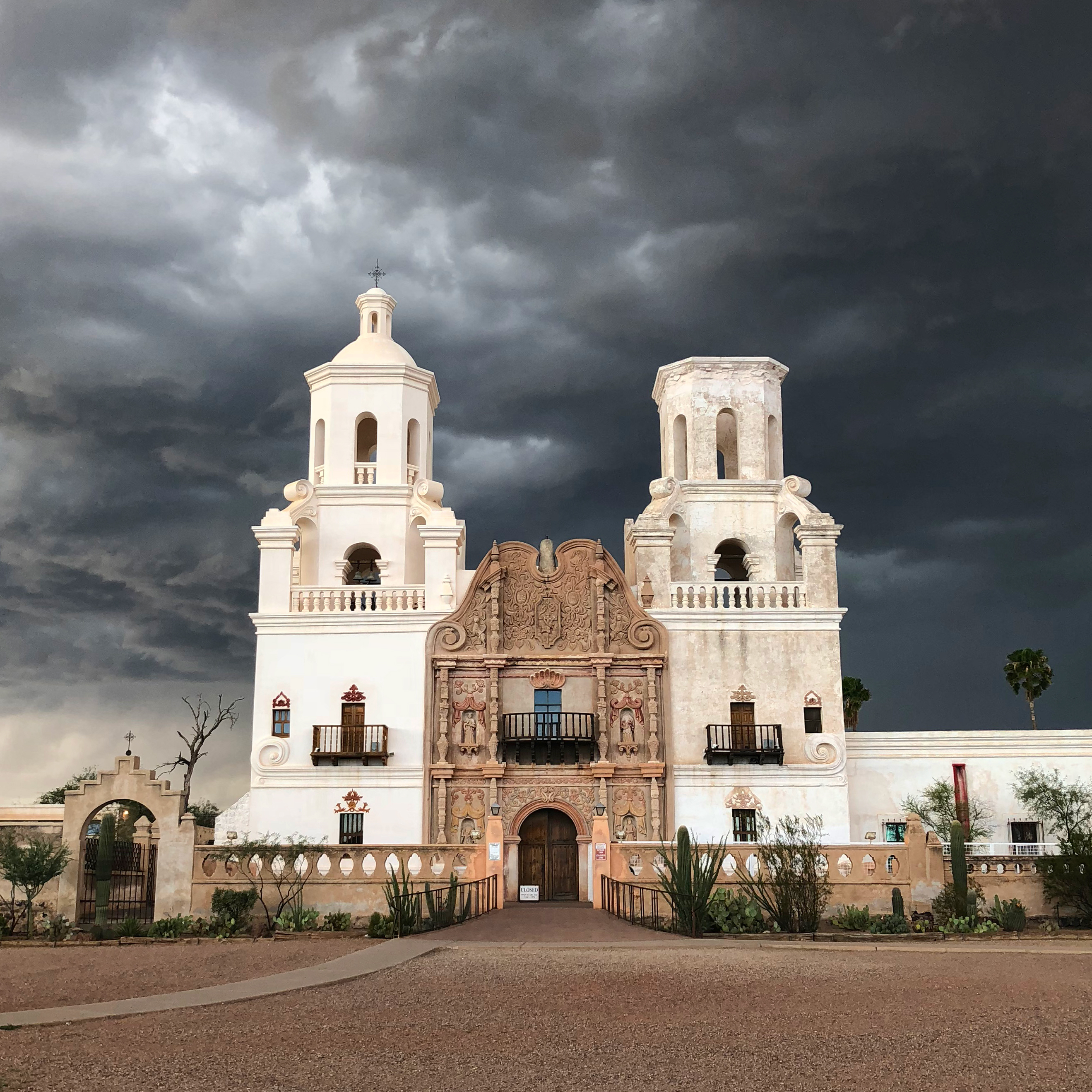
Mission San Xavier del Bac (2019)

The O'odham rebellion of 1751 by the Pima people against Spanish settlers forced the Jesuits to moved the Mission San José de Tumacácori to its current location on the Santa Cruz River. During an Apache raid in 1771, the Mission San Xavier del Bac was destroyed. The Jesuits rebuilt the mission in 1797; today, it is the oldest European structure in Arizona.

After the Mexican War of Independence ended in 1821, Mexico took control of the Spanish colonies in the West. The pastor of Mission San Xavier del Bac,the Jesuit priest Rafael Diaz, refused to sign a loyalty oath in 1828 to the new Mexican Government; he was forced to leave the mission. The Mission San José de Tumacácori was abandoned by 1848 and was never used again as a mission.

With the 1854 Gadsden Purchase, Mexico sold Southern Arizona to the United States. In 1859, the Mission San Xavier del Bac, missing a priest since Rafael Diaz left in 1828, was taken over and staffed by the Diocese of Santa Fe.

=== 1850 to 1900 ===
During the middle 19th century, the Diocese of Santa Fe exercised jurisdiction over Catholics in the Arizona Territory. In 1866, Bishop Jean-Baptiste Lamy of Santa Fe appointed Jean-Baptiste Salpointe as vicar general of Arizona. He was replacing Jesuit missionaries who had been recalled from the area. Later that year, Salpointe arrived in Tucson with two other priests. At the time, Arizona consisted of approximately 6,000 settlers in some half a dozen settlements and several mining camps, as well as Native Americans inhabitants. Salpointe oversaw the construction of new churches, organized congregations, and founded schools in the territory. Salpointe helped build San Agustin Church in Tucson, which would later become the first cathedral in the Arizona Territory.

Pope Pius IX established the Apostolic Vicariate of Arizona in 1868, taking its territory from the Diocese of Santa Fe. The pope named Salpointe as its first apostolic vicar. The first Catholic church in Yuma, Immaculate Conception, was erected in 1868.In 1870, the Sisters of St. Joseph of Carondelet from Carondelet, Missouri, arrived in Tucson to open the first school in that community. In 1880, at the request of executives of the Southern Pacific Railroad, Salpointe opened St. Mary's Hospital in Tucson, the first hospital in the Arizona Territory. In 1881, Sacred Heart Parish was established in Tombstone.

Two years later, Salpointe sold St. Mary's Hospital to the Sisters of St. Joseph. Today it is Carondelet St. Mary's Hospital.Salpointe left Arizona in 1885 to become coadjutor archbishop in Santa Fe. The second apostolic vicar of Tucson was Peter Bourgade, who took office in 1885.In 1893, the Sisters of St. Joseph opened St. Joseph's Orphanage in Tucson.

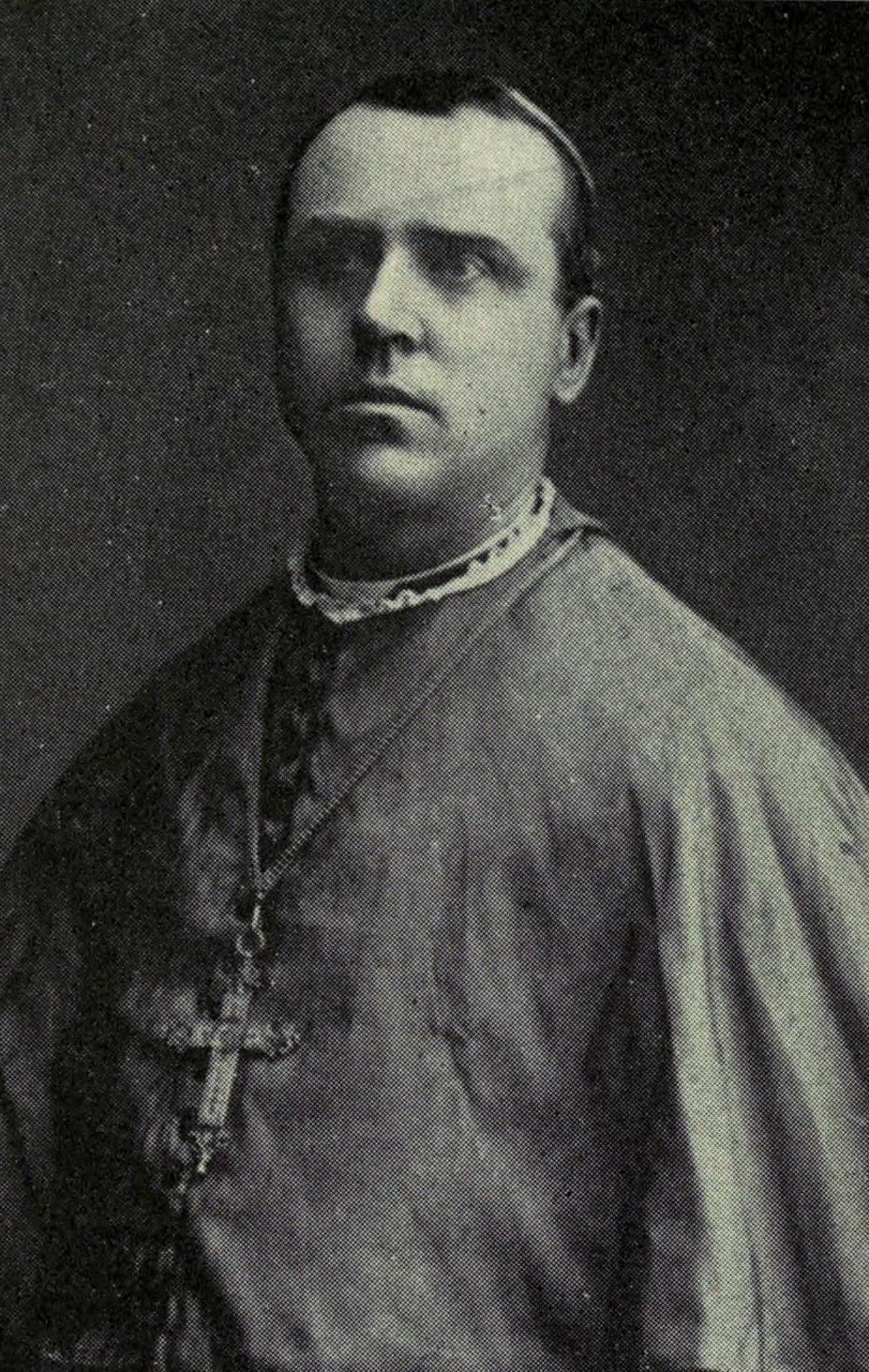
Archbishop Bourgade (1903)

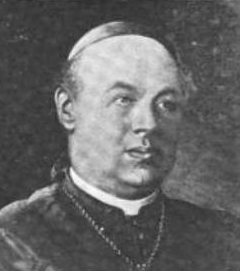
Bishop Granjon (1917)

Leo XIII converted the Apostolic Vicariate of Arizona into the Diocese of Tucson on May 8, 1897. The new diocese covered the entire Arizona Territory, along with parts of New Mexico and Texas. The pope named Bourgade as the first bishop of Tucson. During his two-year tenure as bishop, Bourgade established 12 schools and rebuilt the Cathedral of Saint Augustine. In 1899, Leo XIII appointed Bourgade as archbishop of Santa Fe.

=== 1900 to 2000 ===
Leo XII appointed Henry Regis Granjon as the second bishop of Tucson in 1900. In 1904, Granjon stated that his diocese included "...40,000 Catholics, 90,000 heretics and 30,000 infidels". In 1914, the Vatican erected the Diocese of El Paso, taking all the Texas counties from the Diocese of Tucson. Granjon died in 1922.

To replace Granjon, Pope Pius XI named Daniel Gercke of the Archdiocese of Philadelphia as the next bishop of Tucson in 1923. In 1939, the Diocese of Gallup was created, taking all of the New Mexico territory from the Diocese of Tucson. Auxiliary Bishop Francis Joseph Green of Tucson was named coadjutor bishop of the diocese in early 1960. When Gercke retired that year after 37 years as bishop of Tucson, Green succeeded him. In 1961, the Sisters of St. Joseph opened St. Joseph's Hospital in Tucson. It is today Carondelet St. Joseph Hospital.

Green began major restoration on St. Augustine's Cathedral in 1966, completing the effort in 1968. In 1969, the Vatican erected the Diocese of Phoenix, taking the Salt River Valley and Northern Arizona from the Diocese of Tucson. Green was instrumental in founding the Arizona Ecumenical Council, became an advocate of social justice, and provided ministries for African American, Native American and Hispanic Catholics. Green retired as bishop of Tucson in 1981.

Pope John Paul II appointed Auxiliary Bishop Manuel Moreno of Los Angeles as the next bishop of Tucson in 1982. The Sisters of St. Joseph in 1987 purchased Nogales Hospital in Nogales and renamed it Carondelet Holy Cross Hospital.

=== 2000 to present ===
In 2001, the pope named Auxiliary Bishop Gerald Kicanas of the Archdiocese of Chicago as coadjutor bishop in Tucson to assist Moreno. After Moreno retired in 2003, Kicanas became the next bishop of Tucson. The Diocese of Tucson filed for Chapter 11 bankruptcy in September 2004 due to the sexual abuse claims against Catholic clergy, the second diocese to do so in American history. Kicanas retired as bishop of Tucson in 2017.

Bishop Edward Weisenburger of the Diocese of Salina, succeeded him that same year. In 2020, the Vatican approved Eusebio Kino as venerable, one step in the long process of canonization. After Weisenburger submitted his resignation as bishop of Tucson in 2025, Pope Leo XIV appointed James A. Misko as the next bishop of Tucson in December 2025.

=== Sexual abuse scandal ===
The Diocese of Tucson reached an agreement in bankruptcy court in 2005 to pay a $22.2 million settlement to victims of sex abuse by clergy.

== Bishops ==
=== Apostolic Vicars of Arizona ===
1. Jean-Baptiste Salpointe (1868–1884), appointed Coadjutor Archbishop and later Archbishop of Santa Fe
2. Peter Bourgade (1885–1897)

=== Bishops of Tucson ===
1. Peter Bourgade (1897–1899), appointed Archbishop of Santa Fe
2. Henry Regis Granjon (1900–1922)
3. Daniel James Gercke (1923–1960)
4. Francis Joseph Green (1960–1981)
5. Manuel Duran Moreno (1982–2003)
6. Gerald Frederick Kicanas (2003–2017)
7. Edward Weisenburger (2017–2025)
8. James Misko (2026-present)

=== Coadjutor Bishops ===
- Francis Joseph Green (1960)
- Gerald Frederick Kicanas (2001–2003)

=== Other diocese priest who became bishop ===
Thomas Joseph O'Brien, appointed Bishop of Phoenix in 1981, resigned in 2003, convicted of felony of hit and run involving death, 2004.

== Education ==
The Diocese of Tucson, as of 2026, had 18 elementary schools, one pre-K through 12 school, four high schools, and one early childhood center.

=== High schools ===
- St. Augustine Catholic High School – Tucson
- Salpointe Catholic High School – Tucson
- San Miguel High School – Tucson
- Yuma Catholic High School – Yuma

== Parishes and missions ==
See List of parishes in the Roman Catholic Diocese of Tucson

== Sources and external links ==
- Roman Catholic Diocese of Tucson Official Site
- GigaCatholic with incumbent biography links
- Arizona Catholic Conference
- St. Gianna Oratory – Institute of Christ the King in Tucson
