= Pirtleville, Arizona =

CDP in Cochise County, Arizona

- CDP
- Location in Cochise County and the state of Arizona

- Location in the United States
- Coordinates: 31°21′41″N 109°33′58″W
- Country: United States
- State: Arizona
- County: Cochise

Area
  - Total: 1.86 sq mi (4.83 km^{2})
  - Land: 1.86 sq mi (4.83 km^{2})
  - Water: 0 sq mi (0.00 km^{2})
- Elevation: 3,973 ft (1,211 m)

Population (2020)
  - Total: 1,412
  - Density: 757.8/sq mi (292.58/km^{2})
- Time zone: UTC-7 (MST (no DST))
- ZIP code: 85626
- Area code: 520
- FIPS code: 04-56400
- GNIS feature ID: 2409076

Pirtleville is a census-designated place (CDP) in Cochise County, Arizona, United States. The population was 1,412 at the 2020 census, down from 1,744 at the 2010 census.

== Geography ==
According to the United States Census Bureau, the CDP has a total area of 1.8 square miles (4.7 km^{2}), all land.

== Demographics ==
Historical population
Census	Pop.	Note	%±
2020	1,412		—
U.S. Decennial Census

=== 2020 census ===
As of the 2020 census, Pirtleville had a population of 1,412. The median age was 39.2 years. 24.3% of residents were under the age of 18 and 19.0% of residents were 65 years of age or older. For every 100 females there were 94.2 males, and for every 100 females age 18 and over there were 92.6 males age 18 and over.

95.8% of residents lived in urban areas, while 4.2% lived in rural areas.

There were 487 households in Pirtleville, of which 26.9% had children under the age of 18 living in them. Of all households, 44.1% were married-couple households, 19.1% were households with a male householder and no spouse or partner present, and 32.2% were households with a female householder and no spouse or partner present. About 26.5% of all households were made up of individuals and 16.9% had someone living alone who was 65 years of age or older.

There were 570 housing units, of which 14.6% were vacant. The homeowner vacancy rate was 3.7% and the rental vacancy rate was 7.3%.

Racial composition as of the 2020 census
Race	Number	Percent
White	458	32.4%
Black or African American	4	0.3%
American Indian and Alaska Native	9	0.6%
Asian	2	0.1%
Native Hawaiian and Other Pacific Islander	0	0.0%
Some other race	412	29.2%
Two or more races	527	37.3%
Hispanic or Latino (of any race)	1,336	94.6%

=== 2000 census ===
As of the census of 2000, there were 1,550 people, 454 households, and 361 families living in the CDP. The population density was 861.2 inhabitants per square mile (332.5/km^{2}). There were 531 housing units at an average density of 295.0 per square mile (113.9/km^{2}). The racial makeup of the CDP was 53.2% White, 0.7% Black or African American, 1.3% Native American, 0.5% Asian, 0.3% Pacific Islander, 41.4% from other races, and 2.7% from two or more races. 95.0% of the population were Hispanic or Latino of any race.

There were 454 households, out of which 43.2% had children under the age of 18 living with them, 57.7% were married couples living together, 15.9% had a female householder with no husband present, and 20.3% were non-families. 18.7% of all households were made up of individuals, and 8.6% had someone living alone who was 65 years of age or older. The average household size was 3.41 and the average family size was 3.91.

In the CDP, the age distribution of the population shows 36.0% under the age of 18, 9.1% from 18 to 24, 24.0% from 25 to 44, 20.6% from 45 to 64, and 10.3% who were 65 years of age or older. The median age was 29 years. For every 100 females, there were 99.2 males. For every 100 females age 18 and over, there were 93.4 males.

The median income for a household in the CDP was $19,355, and the median income for a family was $21,301. Males had a median income of $23,359 versus $20,852 for females. The per capita income for the CDP was $7,244. About 30.1% of families and 38.3% of the population were below the poverty line, including 49.8% of those under age 18 and 38.4% of those age 65 or over.

== Notable person ==
- Raul Castro, governor of Arizona and diplomat
