= T. J. Martinez =

Antonio "T. J." Martinez, S.J. (May 10, 1970 – November 28, 2014) was an American Jesuit priest and the founding President of Cristo Rey Jesuit College Preparatory of Houston.

== Early life and education ==
Martinez was born in San Antonio, Texas. He attended St. Mary's Grammar School and St. Joseph Academy in Brownsville, Texas. After high school, Martinez graduated from Boston College with a B.A. in Political Science and Communications. While at BC, Martinez said: "The Jesuits reignited the idea of heading out and doing good. That caught my imagination. The Jesuits are known as the soldiers for Christ and the vanguard of the Church. That spoke to my faith and my sense of adventure." After college, he attended law school at the University of Texas at Austin where he earned a J.D. Martinez studied constitutional law under Charles Alan Wright.

In 1996 he entered the Society of Jesus. After taking vows, he earned a Master of Arts in Philosophy at Loyola University Chicago. He taught theology and worked at Jesuit College Preparatory School of Dallas from 2002 to 2004. Then Martinez studied theology at Weston Jesuit School of Theology in Cambridge, MA from 2004 to 2007, receiving an M.Div. and Th.M. He was ordained on June 9, 2007. After ordination, he earned the M.Ed. in School Leadership at Harvard University in 2008 and he received the Intellectual Contribution Award given by the School Leadership Program.

== Cristo Rey ==
After graduating from Harvard, Martinez moved to Houston and served as founding president of Cristo Rey Jesuit College Preparatory of Houston. The school opened in 2009. It combines a traditional college preparatory program with a salaried job, and serves exclusively children living at or below the poverty line. Fr. Martinez and his leadership team increased the student population from 80 to more than 500; added 150 blue-ribbon corporations so that every student has a job; purchased a nine-acre facility and renovated it into an educational institution; and have raised over $22 million to fund the operating and capital projects of the school, including a new 10,000-square-foot Center for Mission and Ministry that houses a conference center, guest rooms, and the new school chapel.

In 2013, every member of the school's first graduating class was accepted into college.

=== Recognition ===
In 2010, Fr. Martinez was inducted into the Equestrian Order of the Holy Sepulchre, a papal knighthood, for founding Cristo Rey Jesuit. In 2012, Houston's Papercity magazine named him one of four "new influencers" in the Houston. In 2013, the Phi Beta Kappa Society recognized him with the "Outstanding Contribution to Education Award" for launching a new model of school reform in Houston.

For his work with Cristo Rey, Martinez was named a Houstonian of the Year by the Houston Chronicle in 2014. Martinez was recognized with an award from Notre Dame's Alliance for Catholic Education in recognition of his service to Catholic schools.

== Death and funeral ==
In 2014, Martinez died after battling stomach cancer. His funeral was held at the Co-Cathedral of the Sacred Heart in Houston.
