= Garden Villas, Houston =

Subdivision in Houston, Texas, US

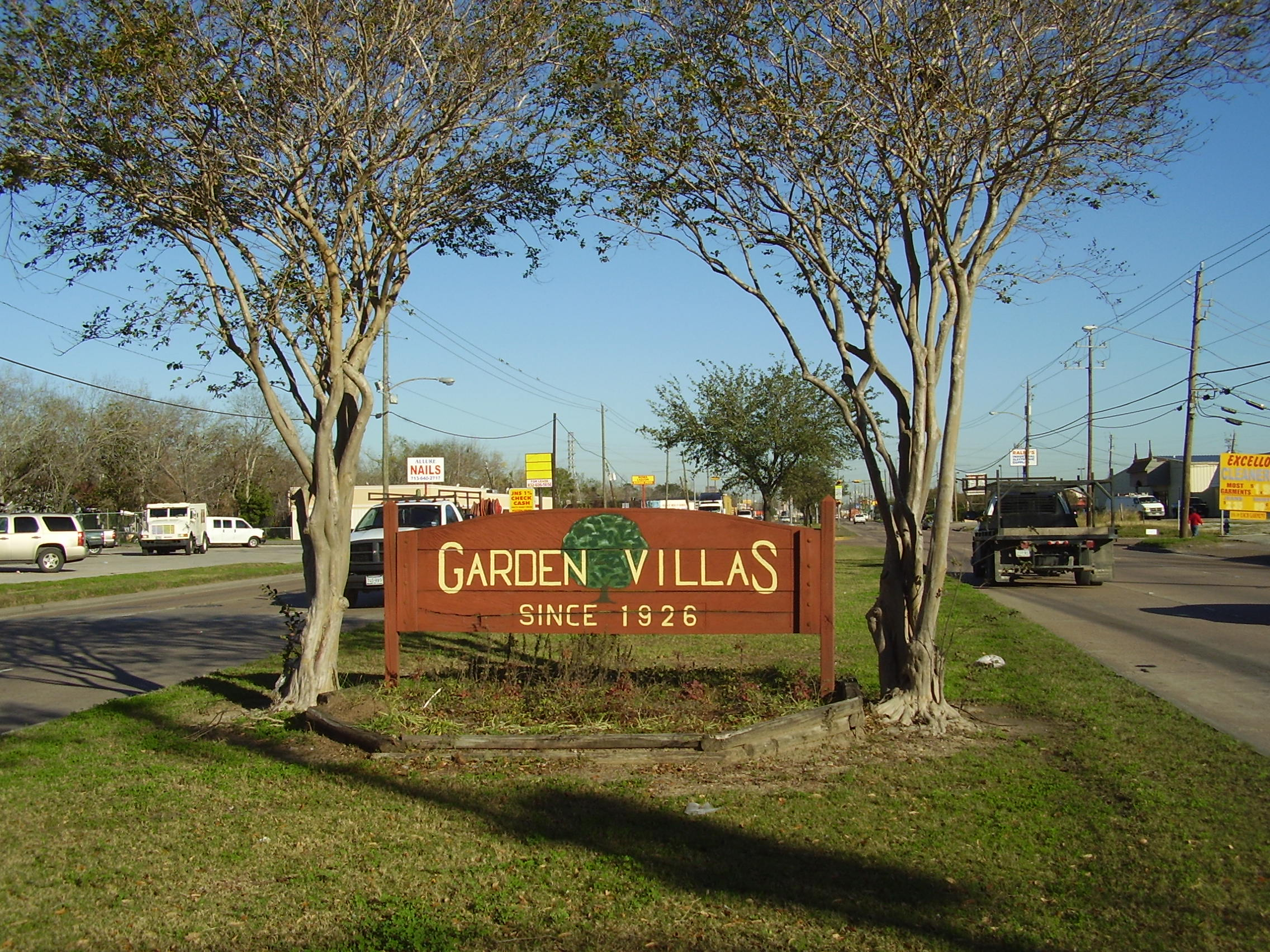
A sign indicating Garden Villas

Garden Villas is a subdivision in Houston, Texas, United States.

Garden Villas is north of Hobby Airport on the banks of Sims Bayou.

The lots range from one-half acre to over 2 acres (8,100 m^{2}). Most homes in the 876-acre (3.55 km^{2}) subdivision were built in the 1930s and 1940s, but construction continued through the 1950s, and the area was largely built out by the end of the decade. There are a few homes that were built in the 1980s and even the late 1990s.

== History ==
W.T. Carter, Jr., a River Oaks developer, platted Garden Villas in 1926 and planted nearly 6,000 pecan trees in the neighborhood. An Englishman and Rice Institute graduate, Edward Wilkinson, worked as the staff architect of Garden Villas. The neighborhood was platted before the city purchased the land now occupied by Hobby Airport.

In 2007 the civic club established a revitalization program.

In 2010 the Houston Press ranked Garden Villas as one of "The Five Most Underrated Neighborhoods In Houston."

== Cityscape ==
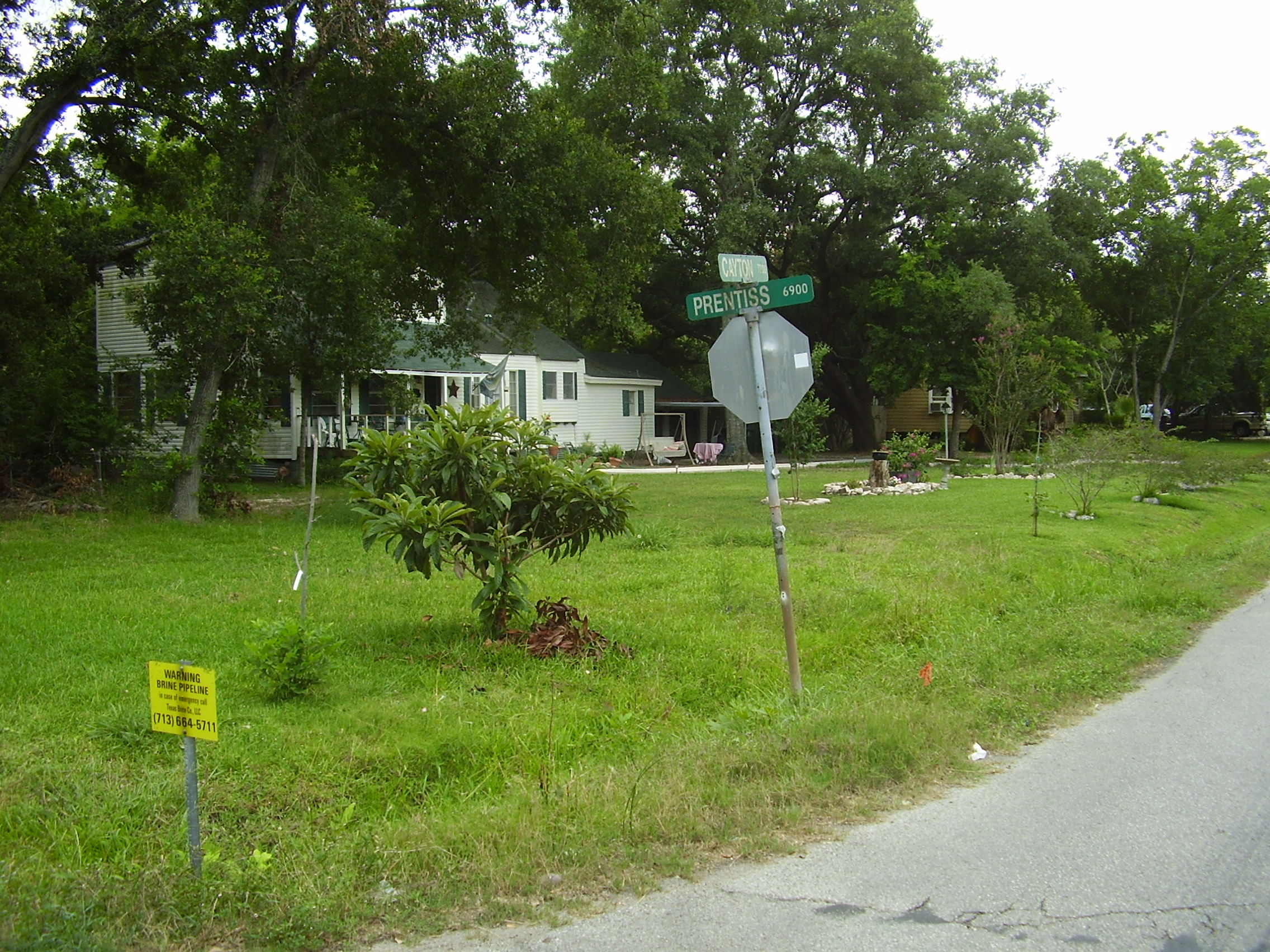
7200 Block of Cayton at 6900 Block of Prentiss

Stephen Fox of Cite said that the original plan of Garden Villas had a "curious mixture of countrified openness and Baroque formality" and that "Garden Villas still seems very much on the edge of Houston, thanks to the presence nearby of the industrial and airports districts." The community included radial cross streets. The civic center of Garden Villas was at the apex of the original city plan, located in proximity to the Sims Bayou. The cross streets focused on the civic center. The developers intended Garden Villas to be a community that would house chicken coops, orchards, and vegetable gardens, so lot sizes were large, with each having .7 acres (0.28 ha) of space. Garden Villas has a lot of pecan trees. Richard Connelly of the Houston Press said in 2010 that the neighborhood has "great old houses from the `30s and `40s, lots of pecan trees, and reasonable prices."

The W.T. Carter Lumber & Building Co. built the houses under the supervision of staff architect Edward Wilkinson. Fox said that the original Garden Villas houses were "not architecturally sophisticated" but that they were "quite recognizable, especially a one-story type with an arched front porch lintel supported on columns." A 1926 advertisement from the subdivision developers described one of Garden Villas's houses as a "ranch house type." This is the first known use of the term in Greater Houston.

Fox said that the 7200 through 7400 blocks of Cayton Avenue were "the heart of Garden Villas." In 1988 Fox concluded that "It's a very Texas place, just the sort of neighborhood for people whom one suspects probably prefer not to live in neighborhoods. Garden Villas still allows them to have it both ways." As of 1988 the blocks have uncurbed streets with pecan trees lining them. The houses on the block, as of 1988, had multiple additions, and Fox described the houses as "rambling." The open yards were, as described by Fox, "not kept up to West U standards."

Garden Villas is in close proximity to Hobby Airport. Connelly said in 2010 that if one lives in Garden Villas, "Planes will be a part of your life" but that one would "get used to the planes, we're told."

== Government and infrastructure ==
The community is within the Houston Police Department's Southeast Patrol Division, headquartered at 8300 Mykawa Road.

The community is, as of 1988, in proximity to the City of Houston Firemen's Training Academy of the Houston Fire Department.

The Harris Health System (formerly Harris County Hospital District) designated the Martin Luther King Health Center in southeast Houston for the ZIP code 77061. The designated public hospital is Ben Taub General Hospital in the Texas Medical Center.

== Education ==
=== Public schools ===
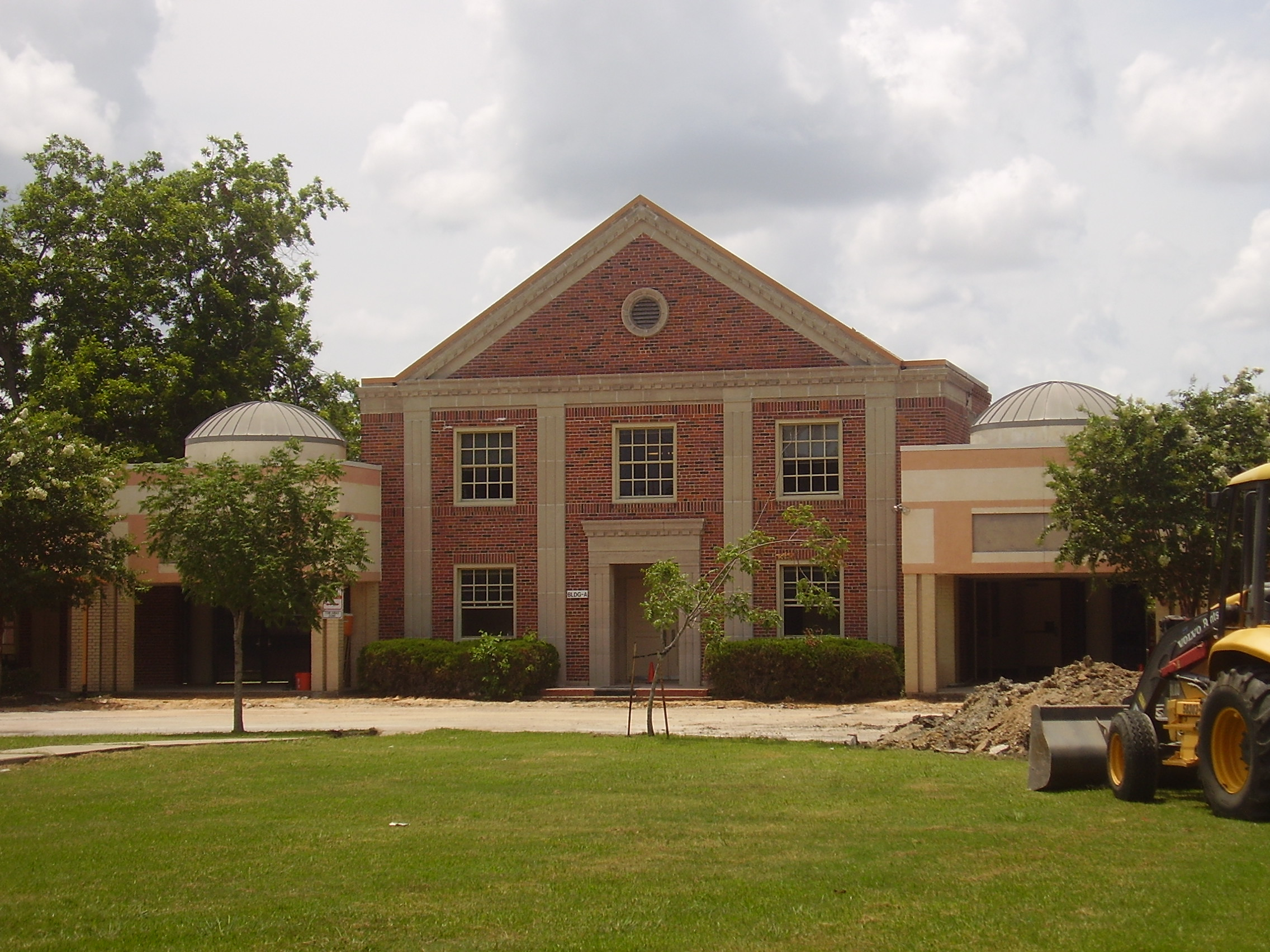
Garden Villas Elementary School

The neighborhood is zoned to the Houston Independent School District. The community is within Trustee District III, represented by Manuel Rodríguez, Jr. as of 2008.

Garden Villas Elementary School was located at the head of the town plan established by Edward Wilkinson. As of 1988 the school had a 1932 two-story entrance block that has neo-Georgian detail and a two-story addition built in 1950, made by Harvin C. Moore and Stayton Nunn. As of 1988 HISD had plans to demolish both original sections. Architect W. Irving Phillips designed a renovation worth $3 million.

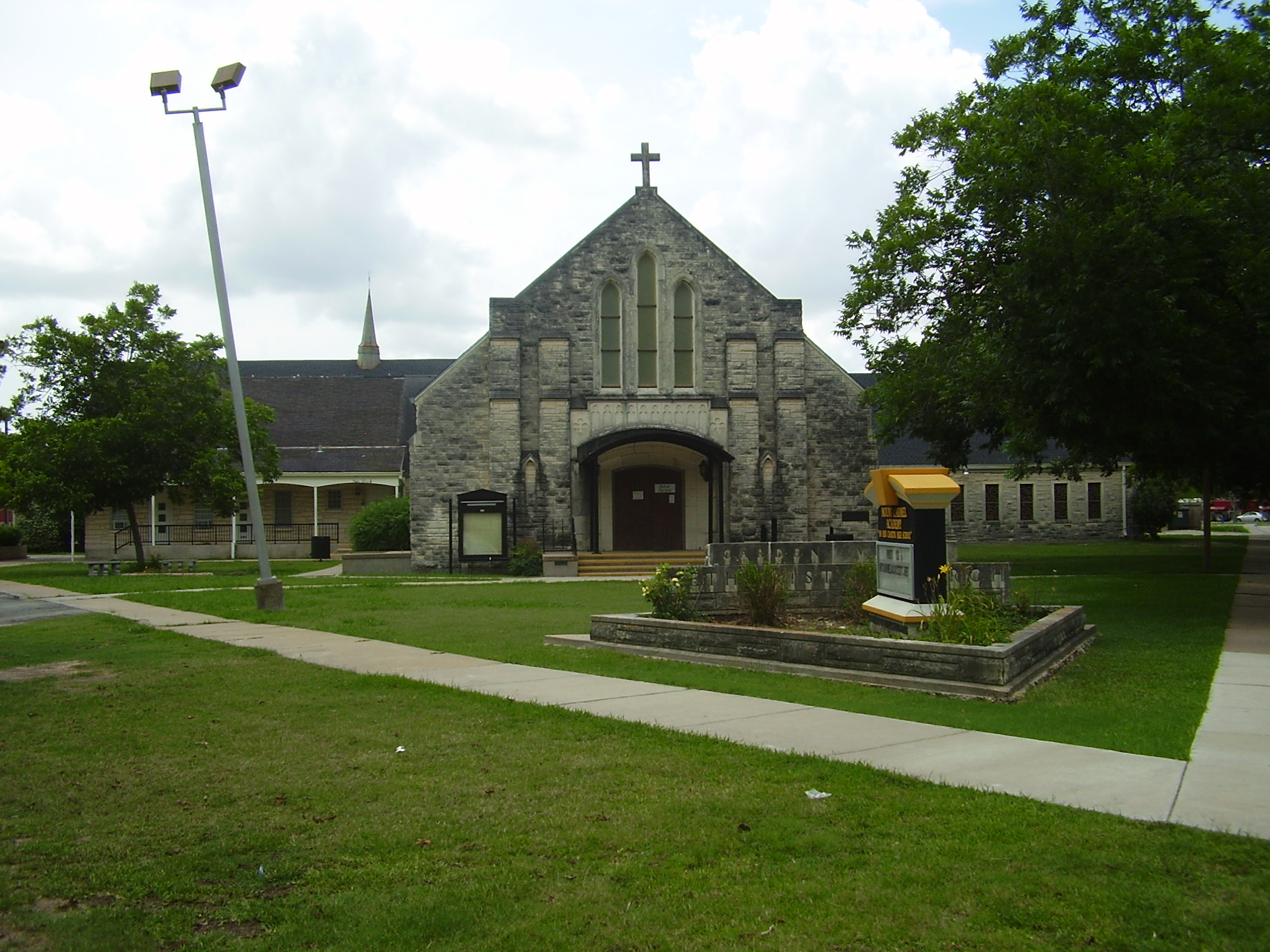
Mount Carmel Academy

Schools serving the neighborhood include Garden Villas Elementary School, Hartman Middle School, and Sterling High School. Ortiz Middle School is adjacent to Garden Villas (Ortiz is on the other side of Telephone Road), yet Garden Villas students are not zoned to Ortiz. Mount Carmel Academy, a charter school, is in Garden Villas.

=== Private schools ===
Mount Carmel High School, a Catholic high school, was in the area until 2008, when it closed. Cristo Rey Jesuit College Preparatory of Houston is scheduled to open in the Mount Carmel facility in fall 2009.

Our Lady of Mount Carmel school, a Kindergarten through Grade 8 school operated by the Archdiocese of Galveston-Houston, was in the area. It opened in 1954, and closed in 2020.

== Parks ==
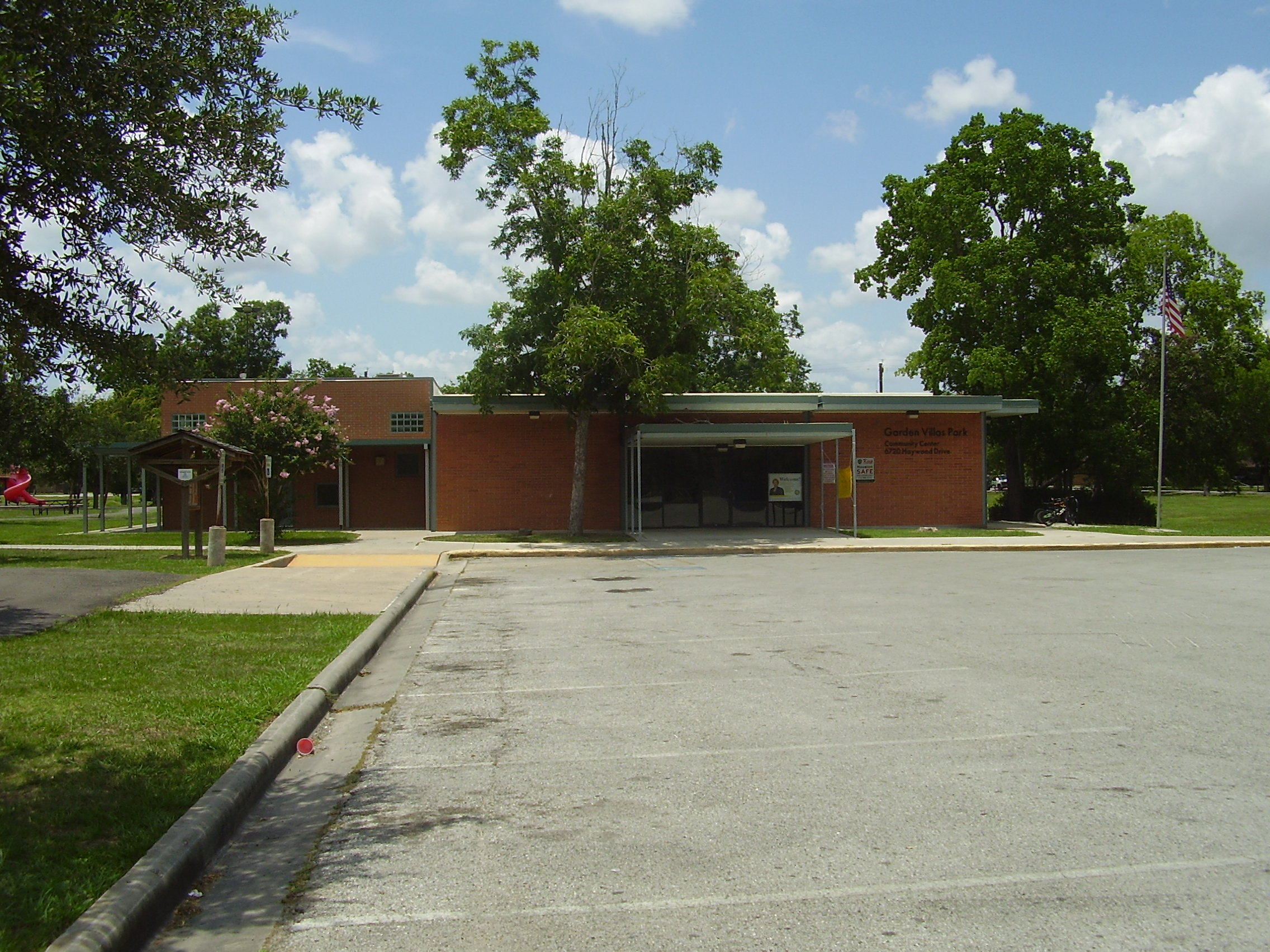
Garden Villas Park

The Garden Villas Park, classified as a "Community Park" by the City of Houston, is located at 6720 South Haywood Drive. Garden Villas Community Center, located on the same lot, has an outdoor basketball pavilion, a lighted sports field, a playground, a volleyball court, and a .49 mile hike and bicycle trail. The park facilities were built in 1959 by William R. Jenkins. As of 1988 the recreation building was a nine-square grid one. Stephen Fox of Cite said that "does get a little stretched in the middle to accommodate the program." As of 1988 the community center has two steel-framed pavilions with articulated structural outrigging. Fox said that the pair of the pavilions "isn't just Miesian, it's Miesian-Palladian." Fox added that "the lofty basketball pavilion provides the classical temenos-like space that Mies could always be counted on to deliver." In addition Carter Park is also in Garden Villas. It has a 60-foot (18 m) baseball court and standalone swing sets.
