= Mount Carmel Academy (Texas) =

High school in Texas, United States

Coordinates: 29.660721°N 95.301761°W

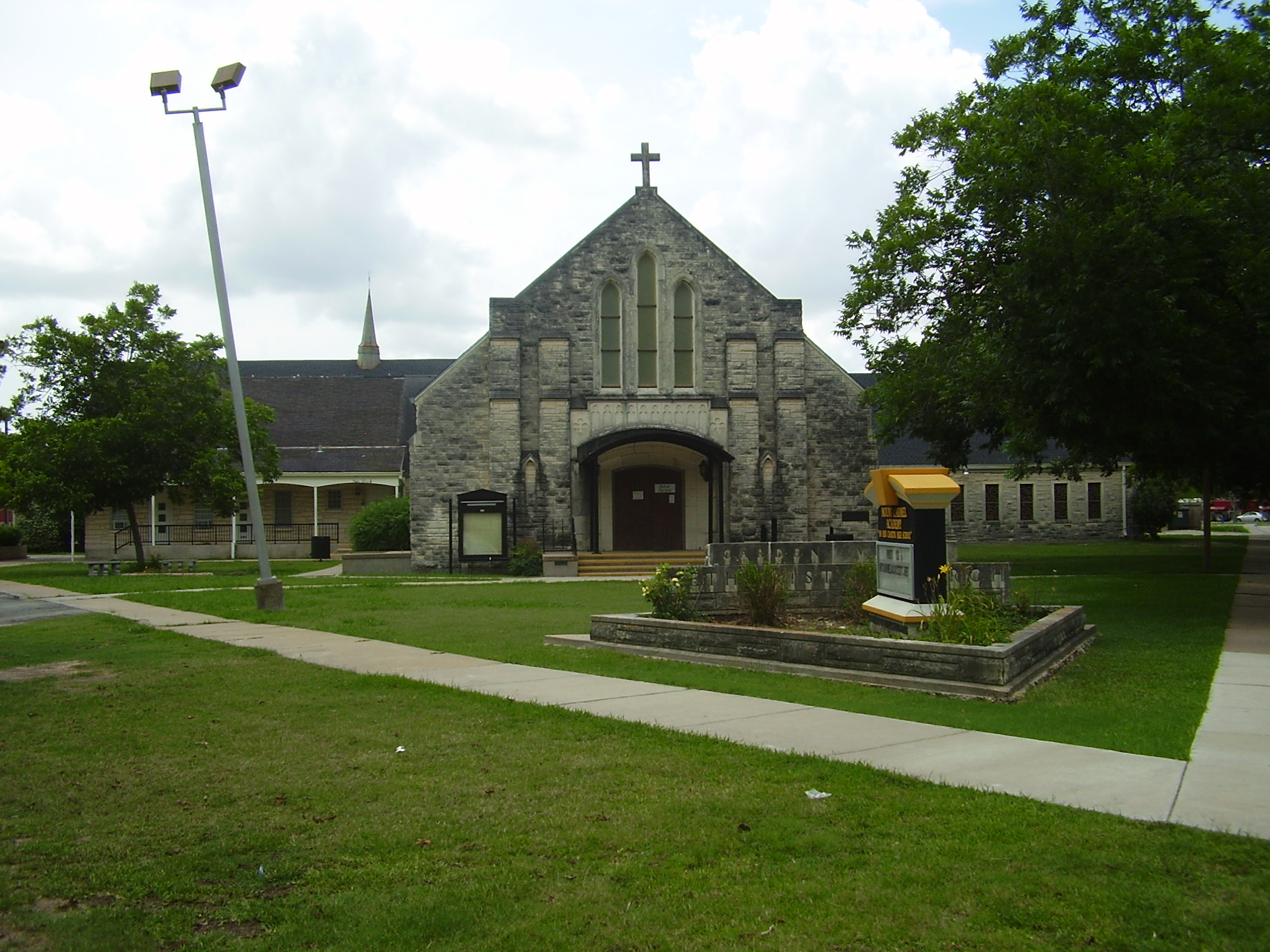

Location
- 7155 Ashburn Street; Garden Villas, Houston, Texas; United States

Information
- Established: 2008; 18 years ago
- Closed: 2024

Mount Carmel Academy (MCA) was a secondary school located at 7155 Ashburn Street in the Garden Villas area of Houston, Texas, United States. Mount Carmel was a contract charter school of the Houston Independent School District.

Mount Carmel Academy was established in 2008 to serve students formerly attending Mount Carmel High School, a Catholic school of the Roman Catholic Archdiocese of Galveston-Houston which closed that spring. The school shut down in December 2024 amid financial and enrollment woes.

== Sports, clubs and activities ==
- Student Council
- Newman Club
- Cooking Club
- Video Game and Anime Club
- Reading and Crafts
- Board Games Club
- Cheerleading
- Spanish Club (active only during Hispanic Heritage month)
- Sports: Football, basketball, baseball, softball, soccer
