= Co-Cathedral of the Sacred Heart (Houston) =

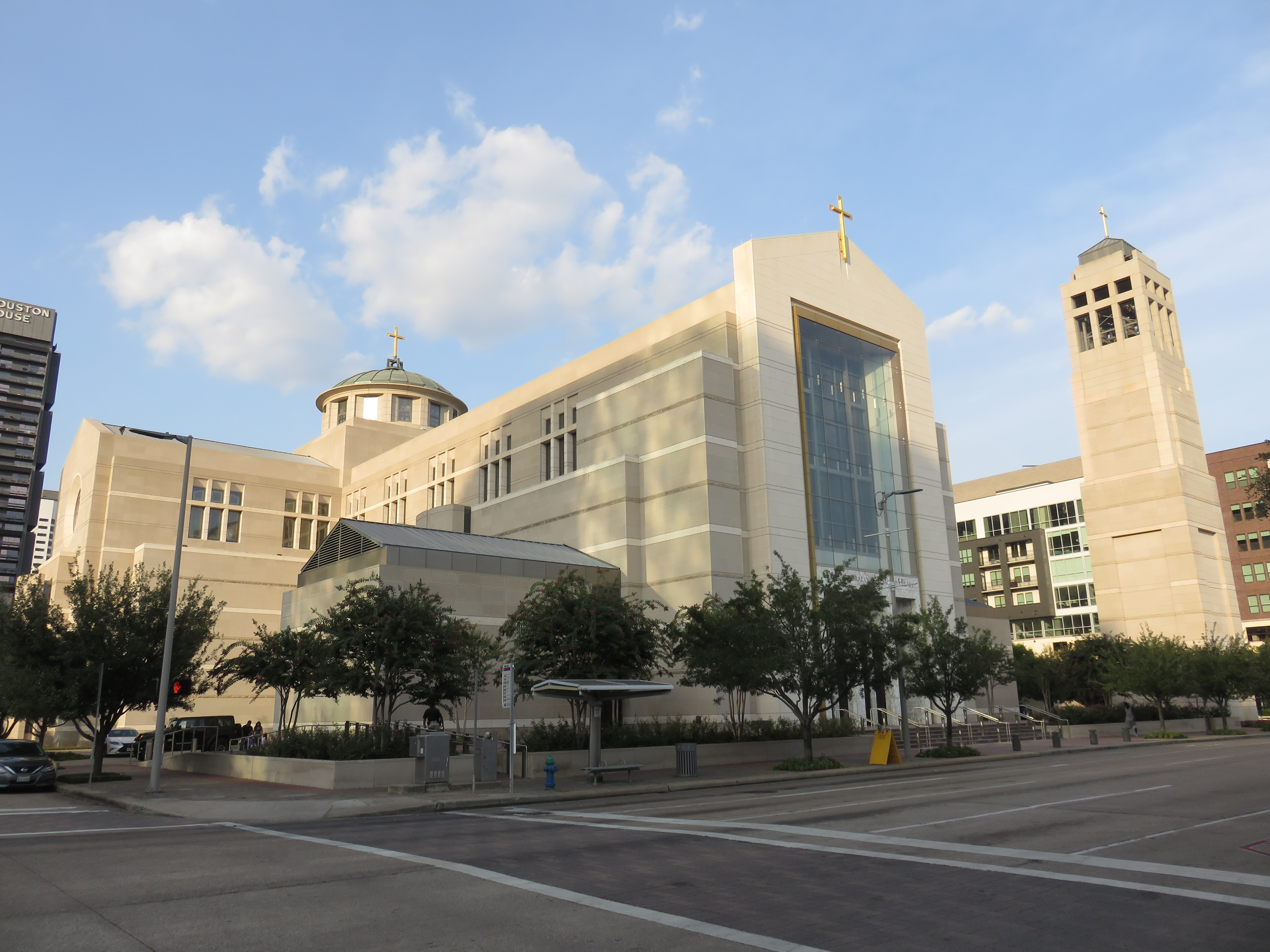

- Location in Texas
- 29°45′00″N 95°22′07″W
- Location: 1111 St. Joseph Parkway; Houston, Texas
- Country: United States
- Denomination: Roman Catholic
- Website: www.sacredhearthouston.org

History
- Status: Co-Cathedral
- Founded: 1896
- Dedication: Sacred Heart of Jesus
- Dedicated: April 2, 2008

Architecture
- Architect: Ziegler Cooper Architects
- Style: Post-modern Art Deco
- Completed: 2008
- Construction cost: $49 million

Specifications
- Capacity: 1,820
- Materials: limestone and marble-clad walls, Metal Roof

Administration
- Diocese: Archdiocese of Galveston-Houston

Clergy
- Archbishop: Most Rev. Joe S. Vásquez
- Rector: Very Rev. Jeff Bame

The Co-Cathedral of the Sacred Heart is a Roman Catholic Cathedral in Houston, Texas, in the United States that serves the Archdiocese of Galveston-Houston. The co-cathedral seats 1,820 people in its 32,000-square-foot (3,000 m^{2}) sanctuary. The other cathedral in the archdiocese is the St. Mary's Cathedral Basilica in Galveston, Texas.

== History ==
=== 1847 to 1900 ===
In 1847, Pope Pius IX converted the Vicariate Apostolic of Texas into the new Diocese of Galveston, with jurisdiction over the entire new State of Texas. At that time, one bishop and ten missionary priests were ministering to 20,000 Catholics scattered across the state. In 1848, Bishop Jean Marie Odin, the first bishop of Galveston, dedicated St. Mary's Church in Galveston St. Mary's Cathedral. It was the first cathedral in Texas and for over 100 years the only cathedral in the Diocese of Galveston.

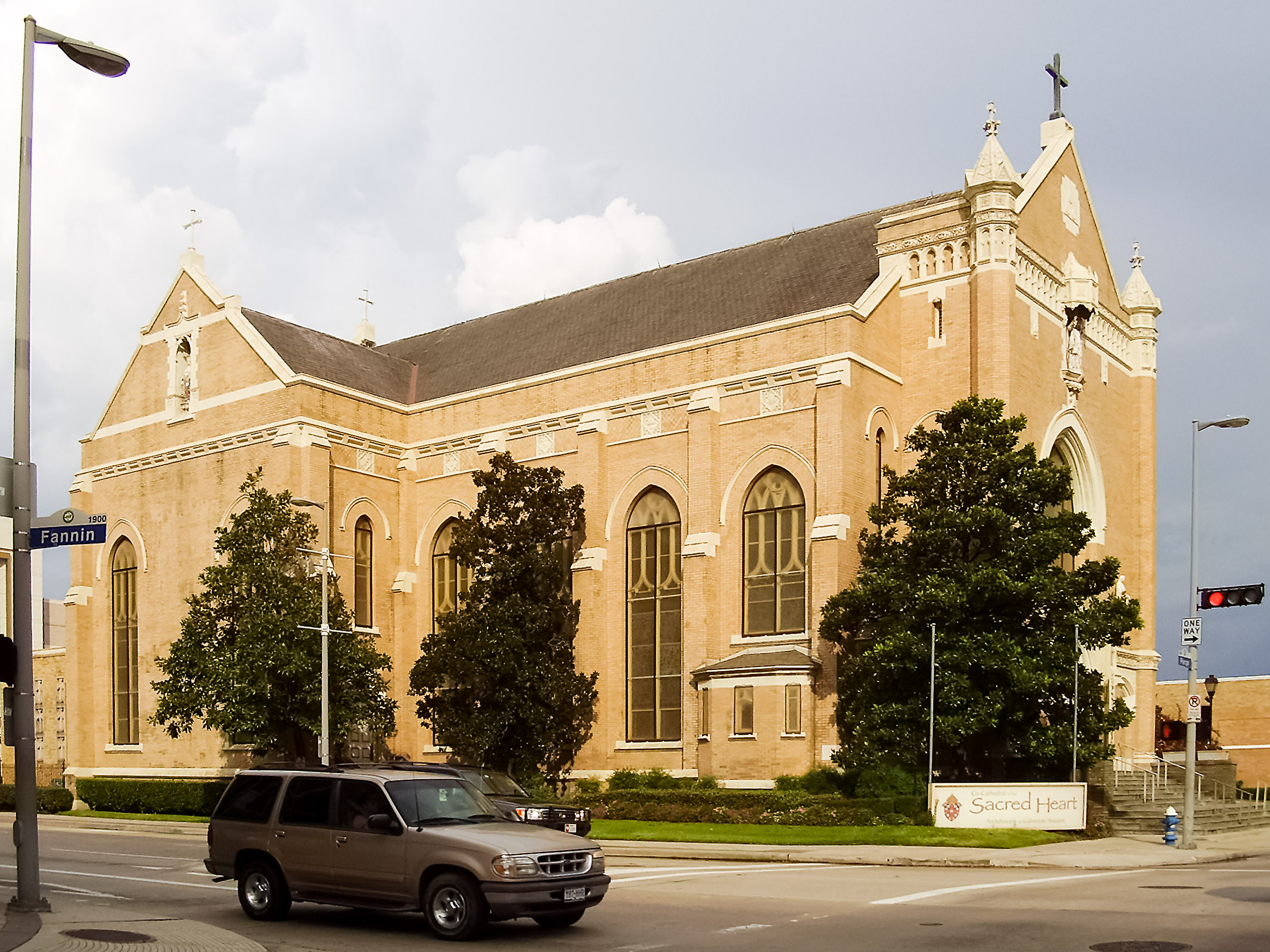
First Co-Cathedral of the Sacred Heart, Houston Texas (2024)

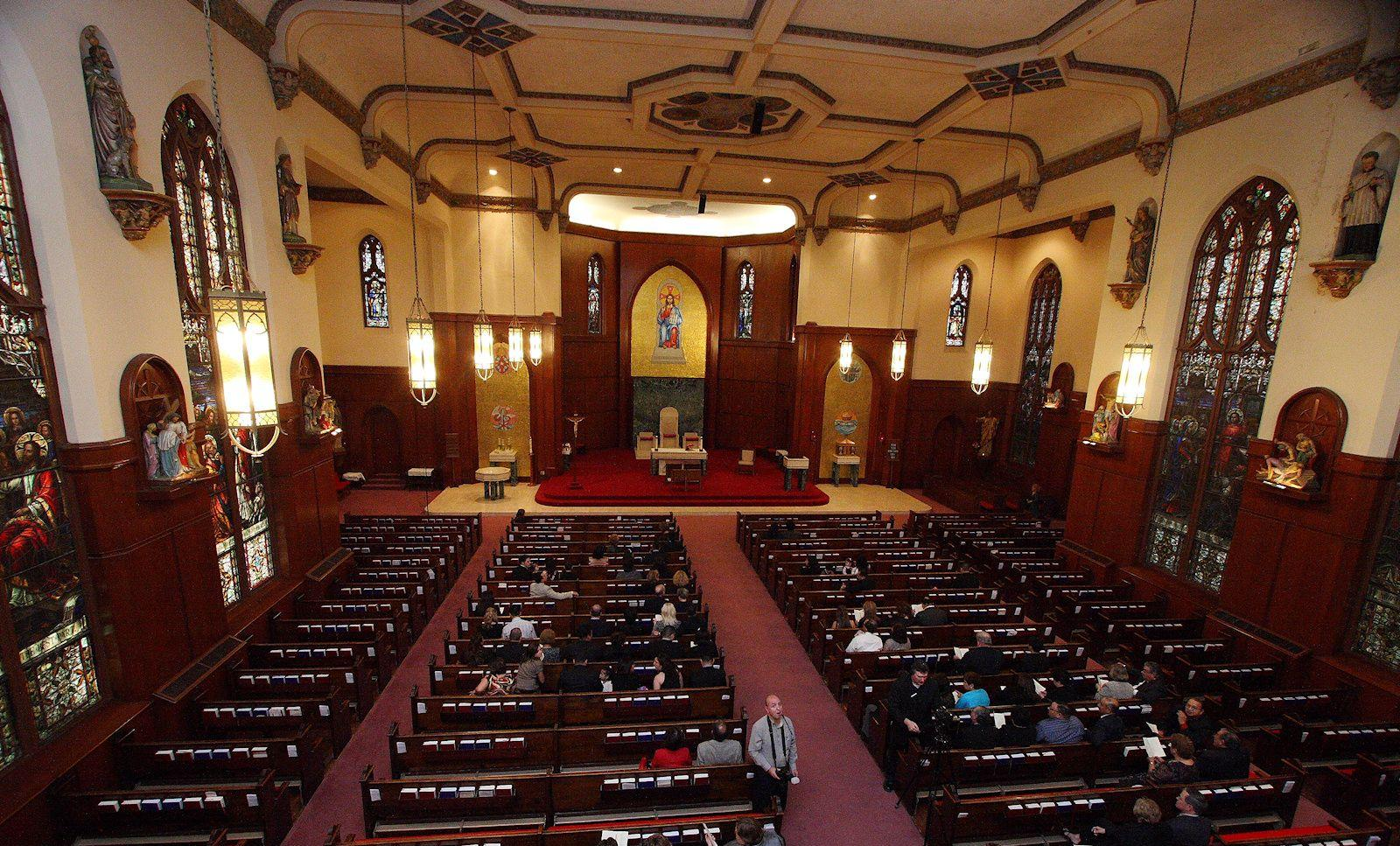
Nave and sanctuary, first Co-Cathedral of the Sacred Heart (2009)

On November 22, 1896, Bishop Nicolaus Aloysius Gallagher established Sacred Heart Parish in downtown Houston, the fourth parish in the city. He appointed Reverend Thomas Keaney as the first pastor of Sacred Heart. In March 1897, Keaney purchased property for a permanent church on Pierce and Fannin Streets in Houston. Two months later, he started building a temporary church for the parish, which was dedicated in November 1897, Keaney hired the Swedish architect Olle J. Lorehn to design a gothic-style Sacred Heart Church.

=== 1900 to 1959 ===
In June 1911, Gallagher laid the cornerstone of the new Sacred Heart Church. It was dedicated In April 1912 at a final cost of $96,669 ($3,298,163.12 as of January 21, 2026). The new three-story Sacred Heart Church accommodated 800 worshippers in its sanctuary. A small wooden rectory was constructed at the back of the new church. The temporary church was then converted into the Sacred Heart School building.

Reverend Morgan J. Crow, the fourth pastor of Sacred Heart Parish, constructed a two-story, brick rectory in 1920, replacing the original one. In 1922, the original school building was demolished to build a new school building costing $52,800. Monsignor Jerome A. Rapp, serving as pastor of Sacred Heart for 25 years, oversaw most of the interior decoration of Sacred Heart Church, including the acquisition of statuary.

Rapp's successor as pastor, Monsignor John J. Roach, installed central heating and air-conditioning in Sacred Heart Church in 1953. In 1954, he purchased the adjacent property at Fannin and Calhoun Streets. With this purchase, the parish owned an entire city block.

=== 1959 to 2000 ===
By the 1950's, the population of the Houston area had grown dramatically. To better serve this part of the diocese, Pope John XXIII in 1959 gave Bishop Wendelin J. Nold the approval to erect a co-cathedral in Houston. The Diocese of Galveston now became the Diocese of Galveston-Houston.

Because of its central location, Nold chose Sacred Heart Church to serve as co-cathedral. The Sacred Heart Co-Cathedral would be equal in status to St. Mary's Cathedral in Galveston. Roach in 1964 refurbished the co-cathedral exteriors and school, enlarged the sacristy and constructed a larger rectory. He also added a side door to the nave and installed new wooden panels on its walls.

The final interior renovation of the first co-cathedral was completed in 1990; it was rededicated on March 25, 1990, by Bishop Joseph A. Fiorenza. The changes included a new cathedra and three new mosaics from Italy.

- The first mosaic was of Christ Pantocrator; it was situated above the cathedra. It represents Jesus as the shepherd and teacher of the Christian church.
- The second mosaic was a eucharistic symbol taken from the feeding of the multitudes. The coat of arms if Pope John Paul II was above the mosaic.
- The third mosaic depicted a baptismal theme and the death and resurrection of Jesus.

The three mosaics were installed by Italo Botti of Chicago.

=== 2000 to 2008 ===
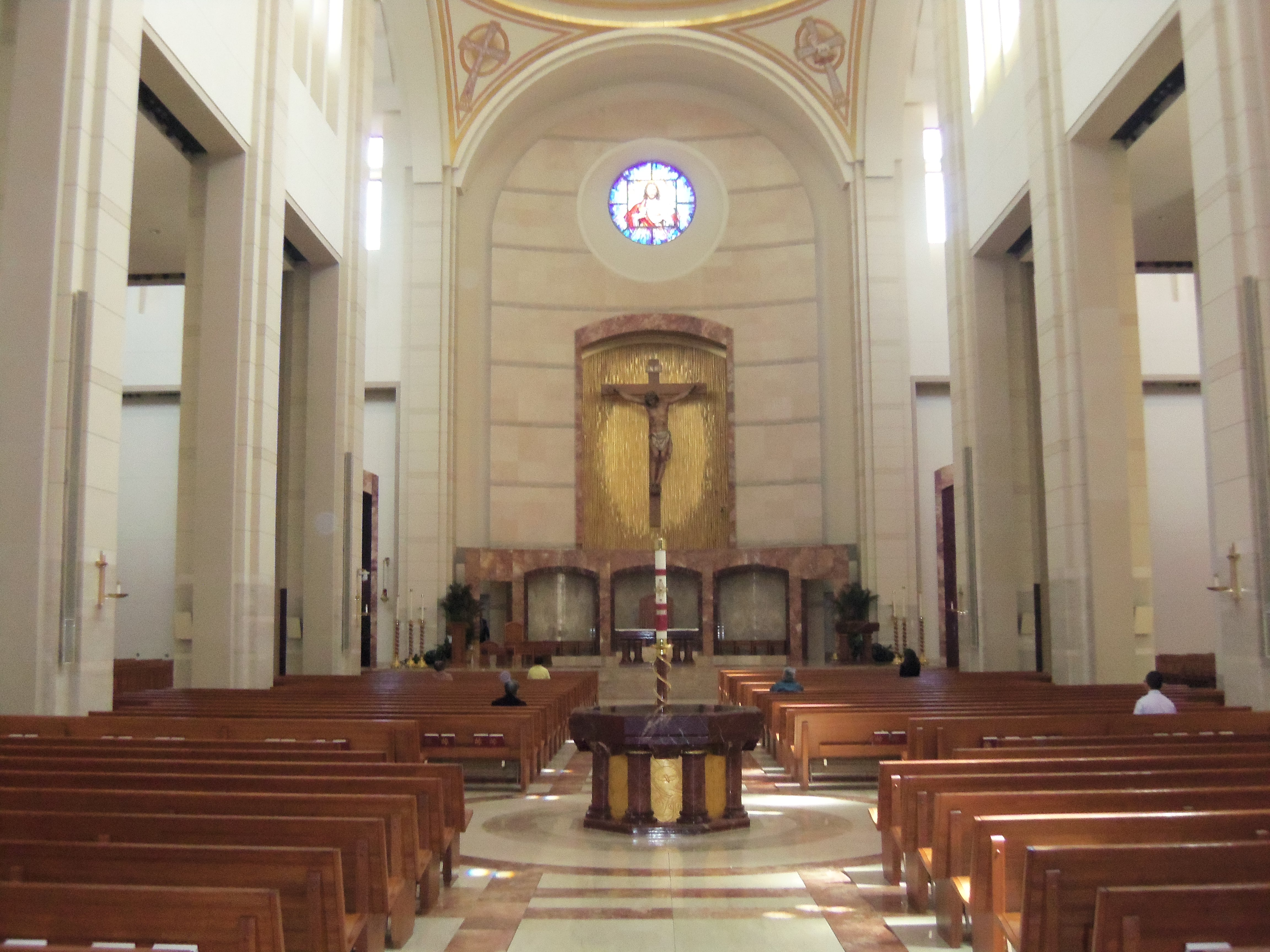
Nave and sanctuary, second Co-Cathedral of the Sacred Heart (2012)

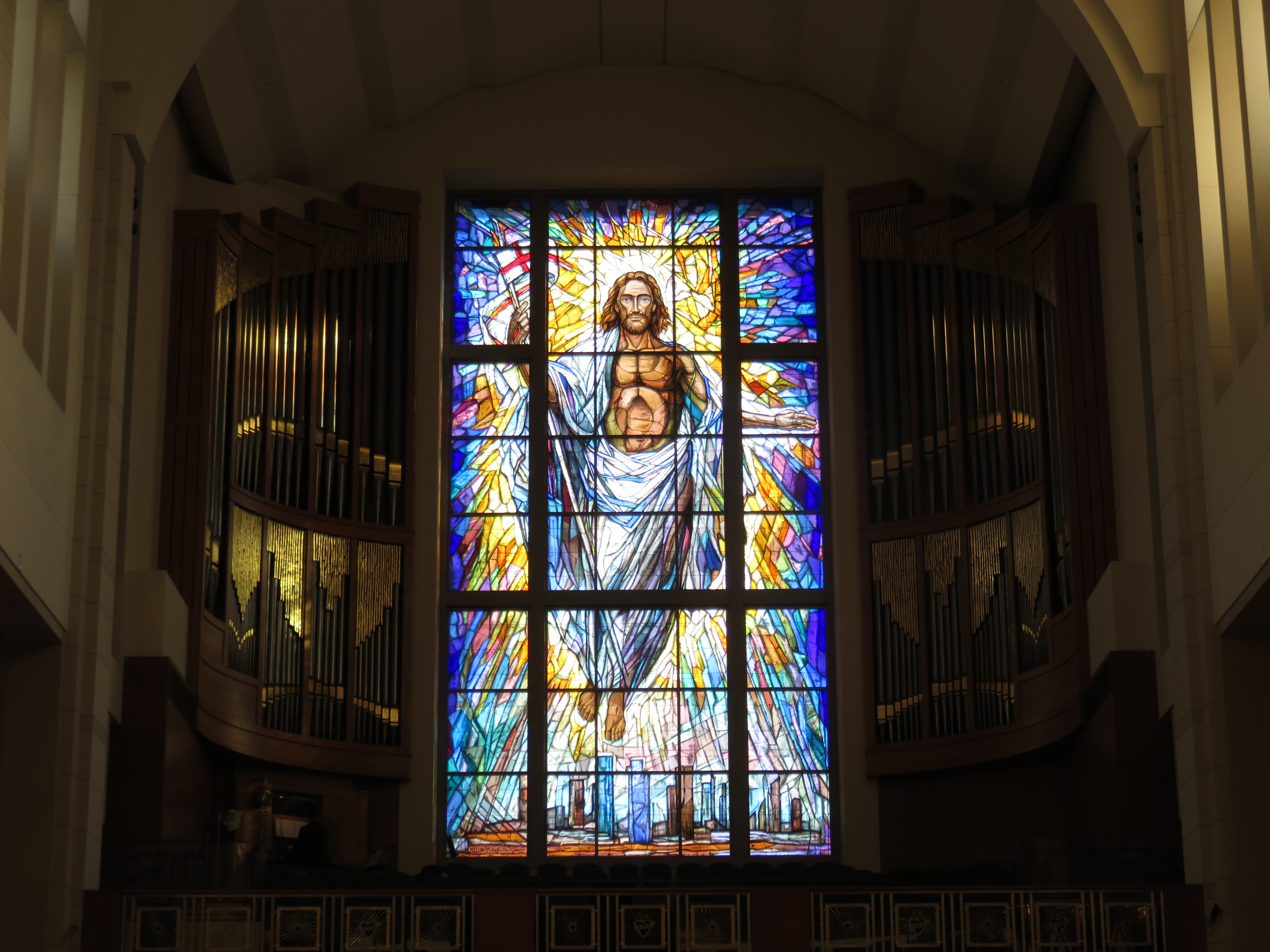
Resurrection window, second Co-Cathedral of the Sacred Heart (2018)

By the 2000s, the archdiocese had outgrown the 90-year-old first Co-Cathedral of the Sacred Heart. Since it was constructed as a parish church, it had been enlarged over the years through a patchwork of renovations and additions. Rather than make more costly additions, the archdiocese decided to construct a new co-cathedral. Fundraising encountered delays due to the effects of Tropical Storm Alison, which cause extensive damage in the Houston area in 2001. The national clergy sexual abuse scandal also impacted fundraising.

Fiorenza hired Ziegler Cooper Architects of Houston to design the building and Linbeck Group in Houston as general contractor. In 2002, design began for the new co-cathedral. Working with Fiorenza, the architects constructed a model of the final design concept. Fiorenza took a picture of the co-cathedral model to the Vatican where he reportedly obtained approval of the design from Pope John Paul II.

John Paul II in December 2004 elevated the Diocese of Galveston-Houston to the Archdiocese of Galveston-Houston, with Fiorenza as its first archbishop. In January 2005, Fiorenza presided over a groundbreaking ceremony for the second co-cathedral. Construction began shortly afterwards.

In December 2006, the co-cathedral parish purchased the former Federal Reserve Bank Building, adjacent to the new co-cathedral, for $5 million. The parish converted the building into the Cathedral Centre, housing classrooms, offices, a parish hall, youth rooms, a child care center, music rooms, a library, and a cafeteria. The renovations were expected to cost $2 million. The archdiocese in 2007 announced plans to demolish the Sacred Heart School building and replace it with a parking lot.

=== 2008 to present ===
On April 2, 2008, Cardinal Daniel DiNardo and Fiorenza celebrate a dedication mass for the new Co-Cathedral of the Sacred Heart. It was attended by bishops and cardinals from across the United States and around the world. During the ceremony, DiNardo placed several relics under the main altar. The final cost of the project was US$49,000,000. The new Martin Pasi Opus 19 organ was dedicated by DiNardo in 2010.

In 2023 the archdiocese demolished the first Co-Cathedral of the Sacred Heart to create a plaza and a parking lot. In June 2023, a fire broke out in the mechanicals room in the second flood of the co-cathedral, causing heavy smoke in the building and prompting an evacuation. The fire caused no significant damage.

== Description ==
=== Structure ===
The footprint for the second Co-Cathedral of the Sacred Heart is 27,800 square feet (2,580 m^{2}) occupying on a site of 37,000 square feet (3,400 m^{2}). It seats 1,820 with room for an additional 200 temporary chairs. The co-cathedral is designed in a simplified Italian Romanesque style with a cruciform shape. The walls are clad in Indiana Limestone, with the interior surfaces accented with 30,000 sq ft (2,800 m^{2}) of marble.

The shallow dome over the crossing extends to a height of 117 feet (36 m) over the 72 feet (22 m)-tall nave. The exterior of the dome is clad in copper and capped by a gilded crucifix. The interior of the dome features an 8 ft (2.4 m) occulus depicting the Holy Spirit in stained glass. The bell tower is 140 feet (43 m) high. The co-cathedral has 108 stained glass panels and windows, including those in the clerestory. They were designed and constructed in Florence, Italy by Mellini Art Glass and Mosaics.

=== Relics ===
The main altar contains relics of the following saints:

- Elizabeth Ann Seton, the first American saint
- Pope Leo I
- Thérèse of Lisieux
- Margaret Mary Alacoque

== Awards ==
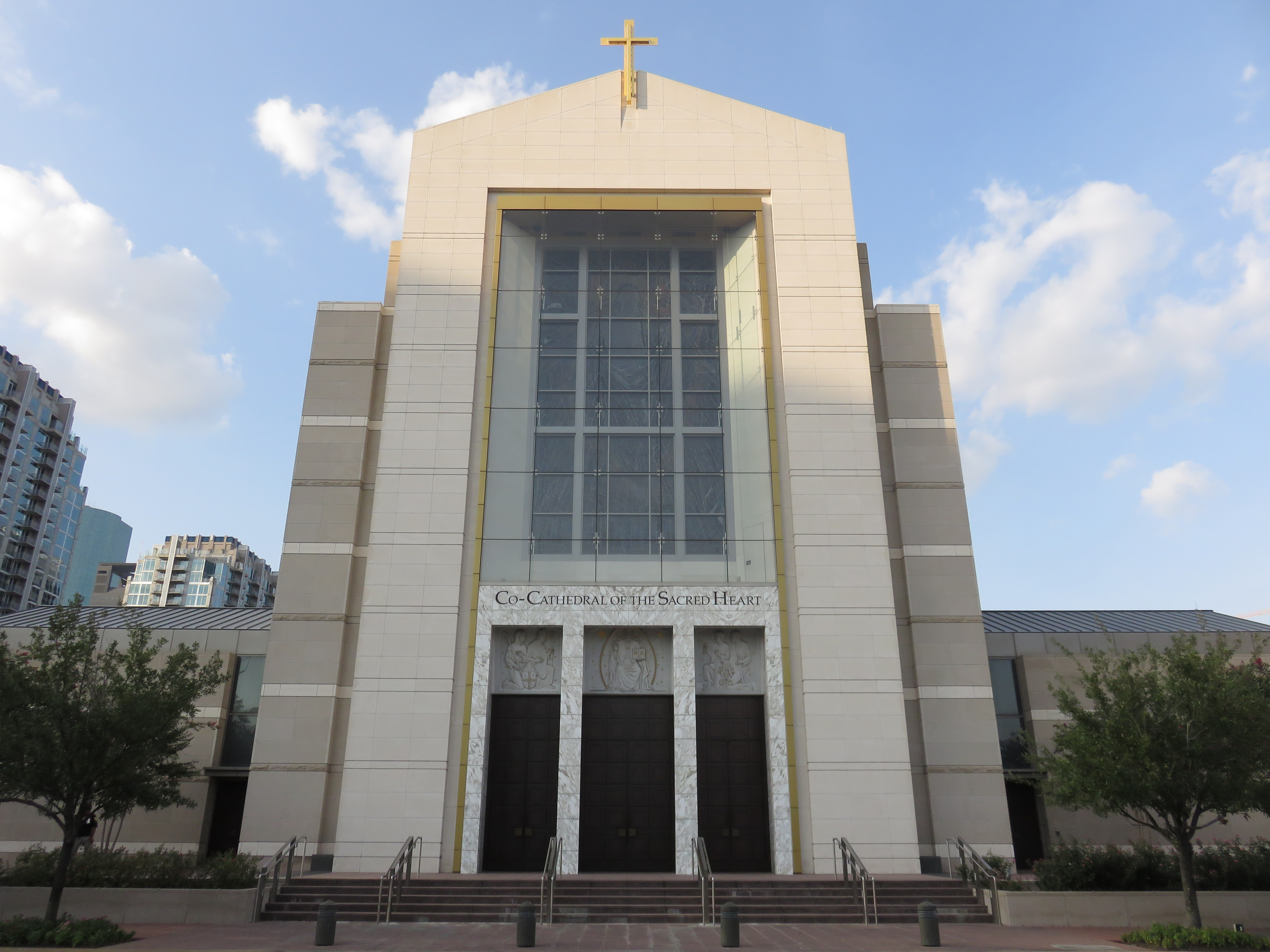
Main façade, second Co-Cathedral of the Sacred Heart (2018)

Linbeck Group, the general contractor for the second Co-Cathedral of the Sacred Heart, received the following awards for this project:

- 2008 Craftsmanship Award, Construction Specifications Institute (CSI Houston)
- 2008 Excellence in Construction Award, American Subcontractors Association (ASA)
- 2008 Houston Apex Award, Associated General Contractors (AGC)
- 2008 McGraw-Hill Best of the Best Award
- 2008 Outstanding Construction Award, AGC Texas Building Branch (TBB)
- 2008 Standard of Excellence Award, AGC
- 2008 Texas Construction Judges Award
- 2009 Build America Award, AGC

== Gallery ==
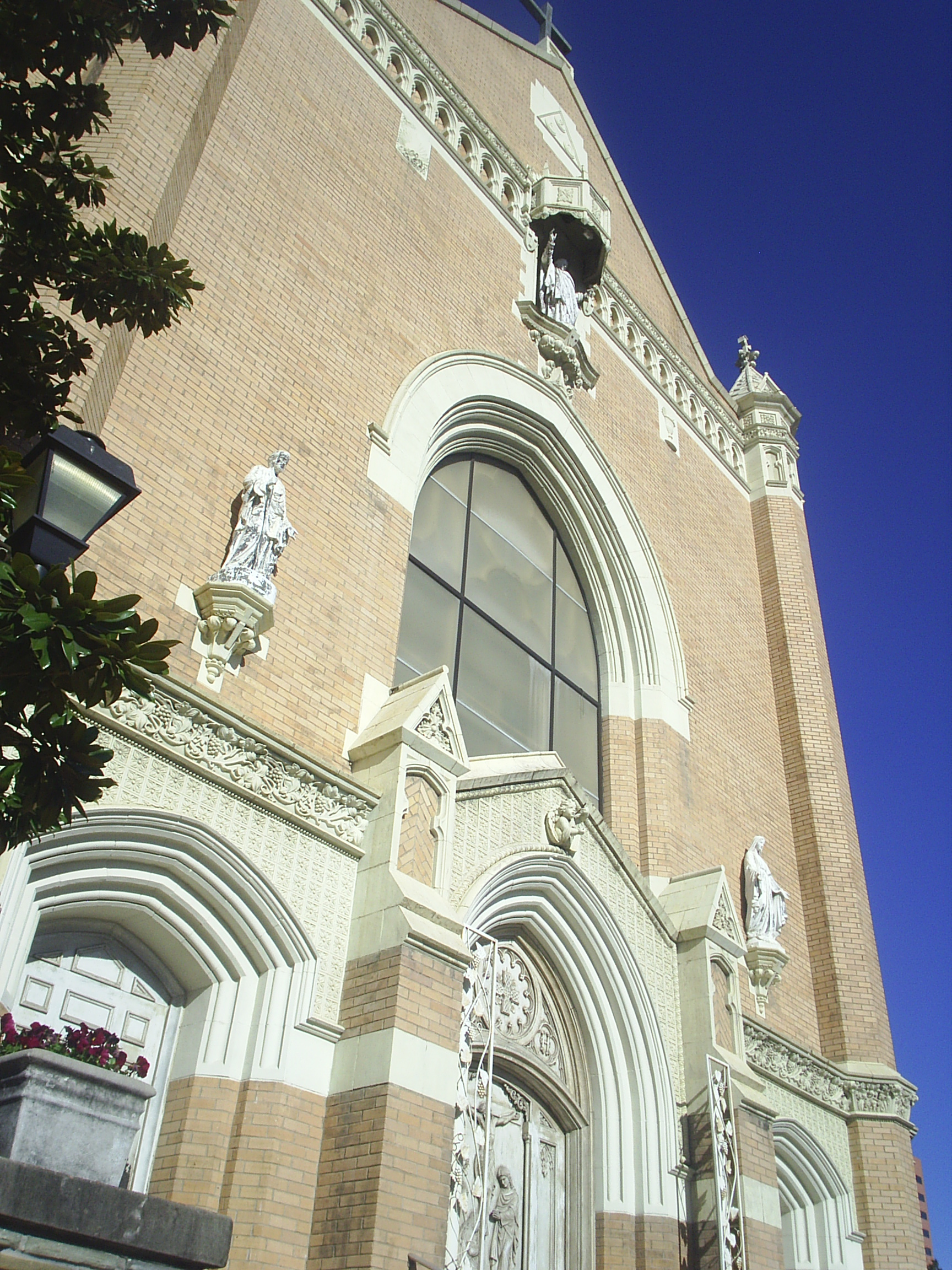
Façade detail, first co- cathedral (2005)

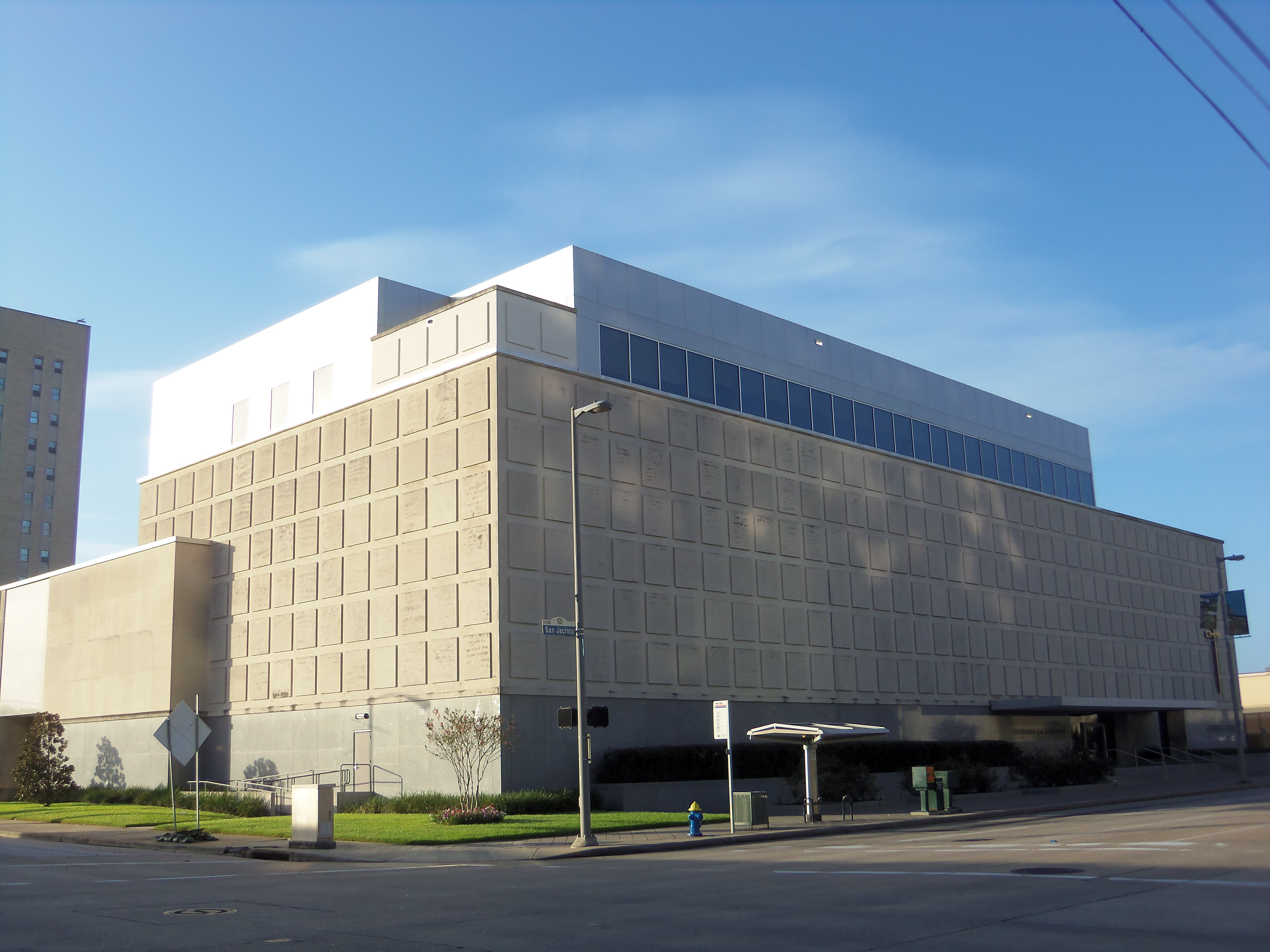
Cathedral Center, second co-cathedral (2012)

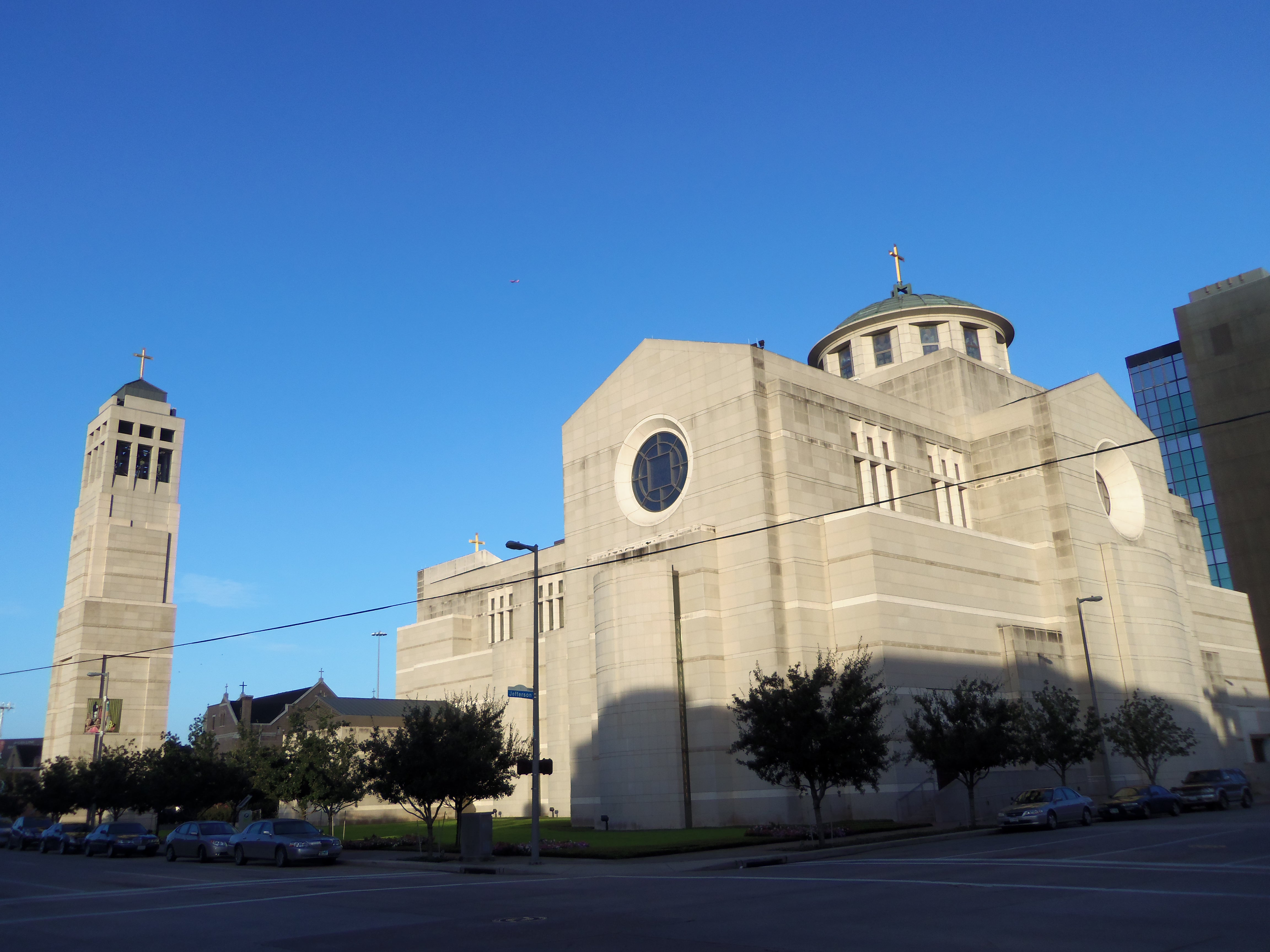
North façade, second co-cathedral (2012)

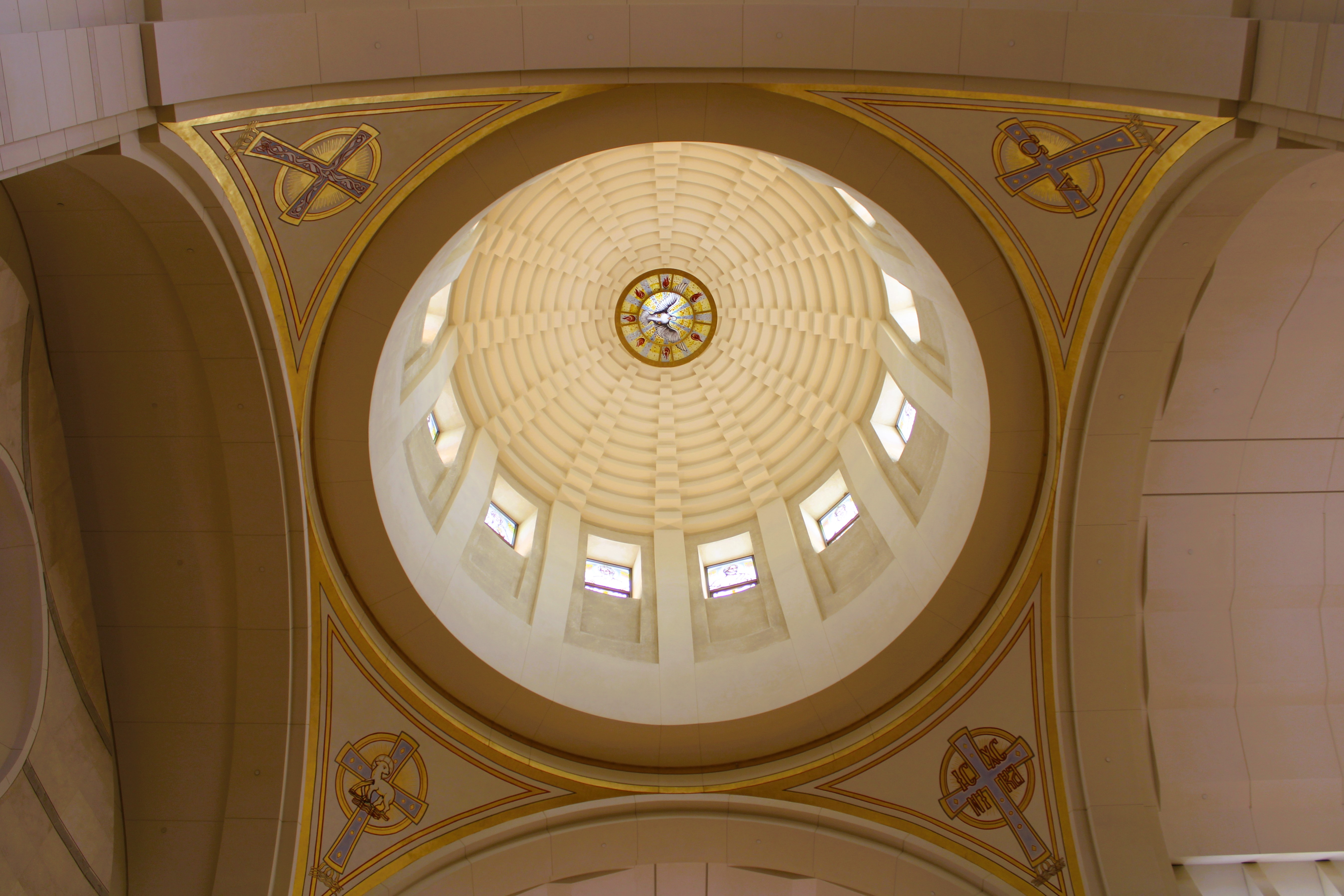
Interior of the dome, second co-cathedral (2023)

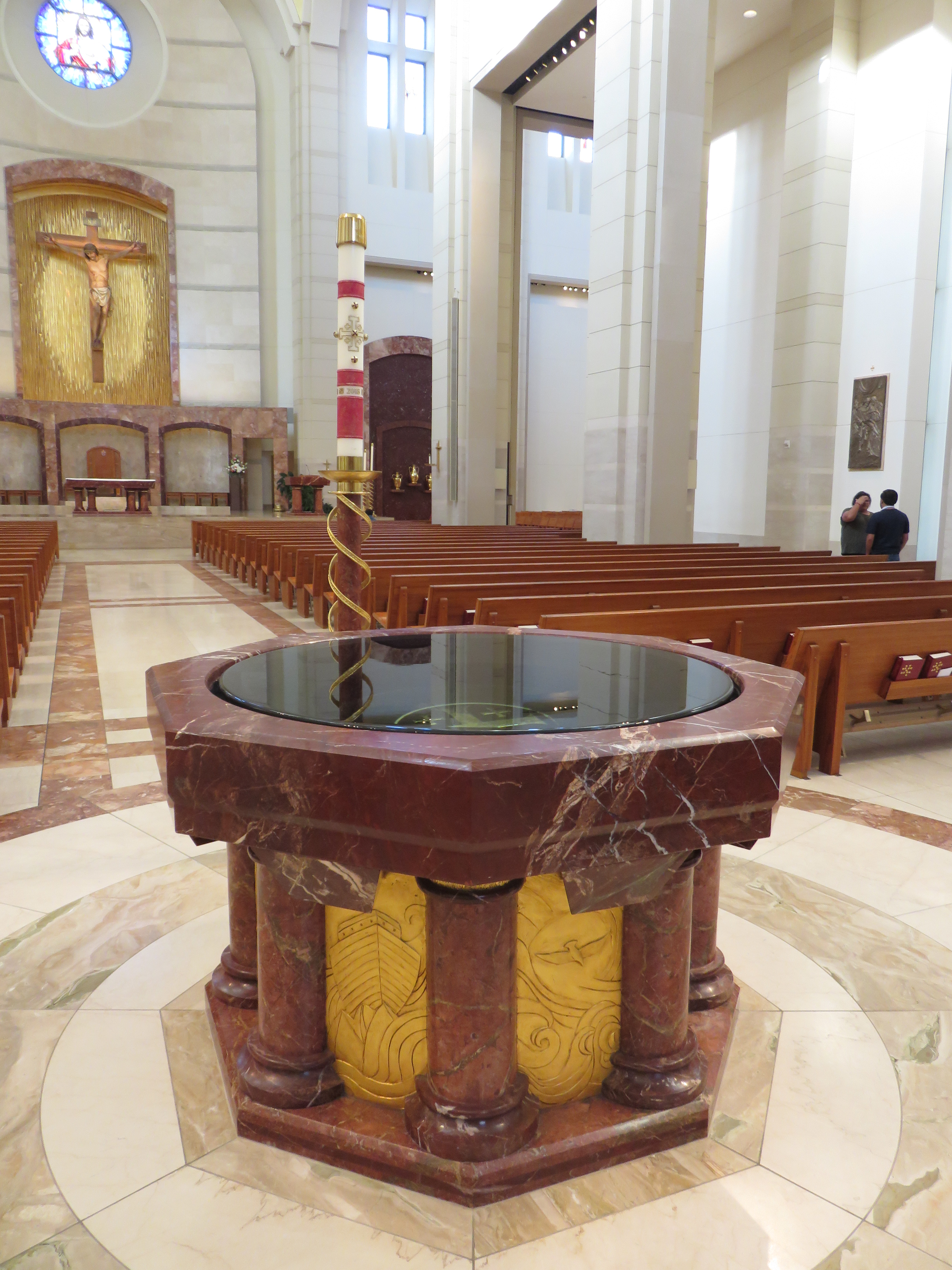
Baptismal font, second co-cathedral (2018)

== See also ==
- List of Catholic cathedrals in the United States
- List of cathedrals in the United States
- St. Mary's Cathedral Basilica - Mother Cathedral of Texas and the Archdiocese of Galveston-Houston.
- Christianity in Houston
- Galveston, Texas
- Houston, Texas
