= Mount Carmel High School (Houston) =

Location
- 6700 Mt Carmel Dr; Houston, Texas 77087; United States; 29.66299°N 95.30741°W

Information
- Type: Private, coeducational
- Motto: Zelo zelatus sum pro domino Deo exercituum (With zeal have I been zealous for the Lord God of Hosts)
- Religious affiliation: Roman Catholic
- Founded: 1956
- Founder: Carmelites
- Closed: 2008
- Grades: 9-12
- Colors: Brown; White; Gold
- Nickname: Rebels
- Rival: St. Pius X
- Accreditation: Southern Association of Colleges and Schools
- Newspaper: The Carmel Light
- Yearbook: Zelo
- Tuition: $6,000 upon closing in 2008
- Graduates: 5,000+
- Alumni: Glenn Bujnoch Mark Ross Melanie Lawson Chris Sims
- Website: mtcarmelhs.org at the Wayback Machine (archive index)
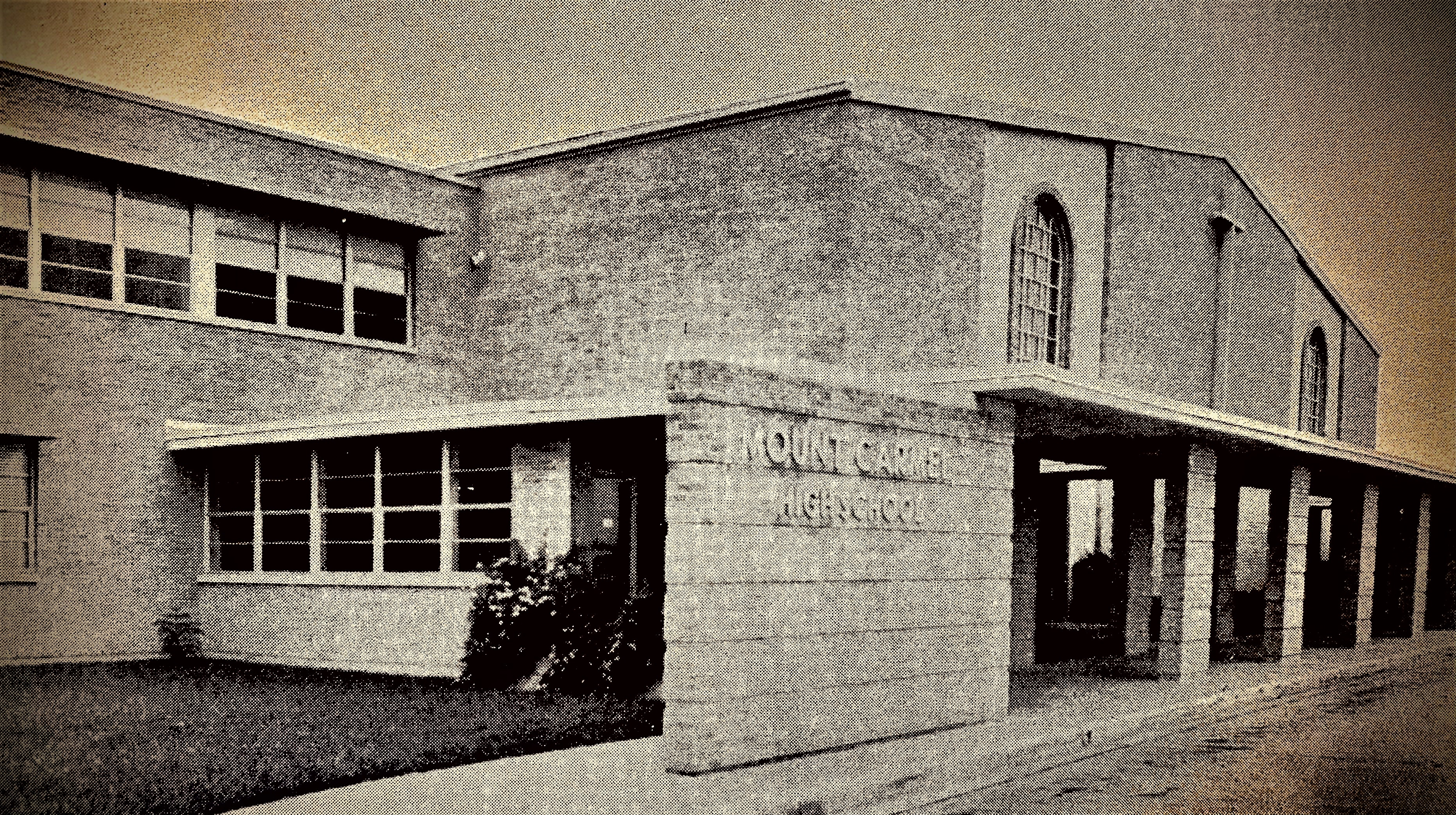

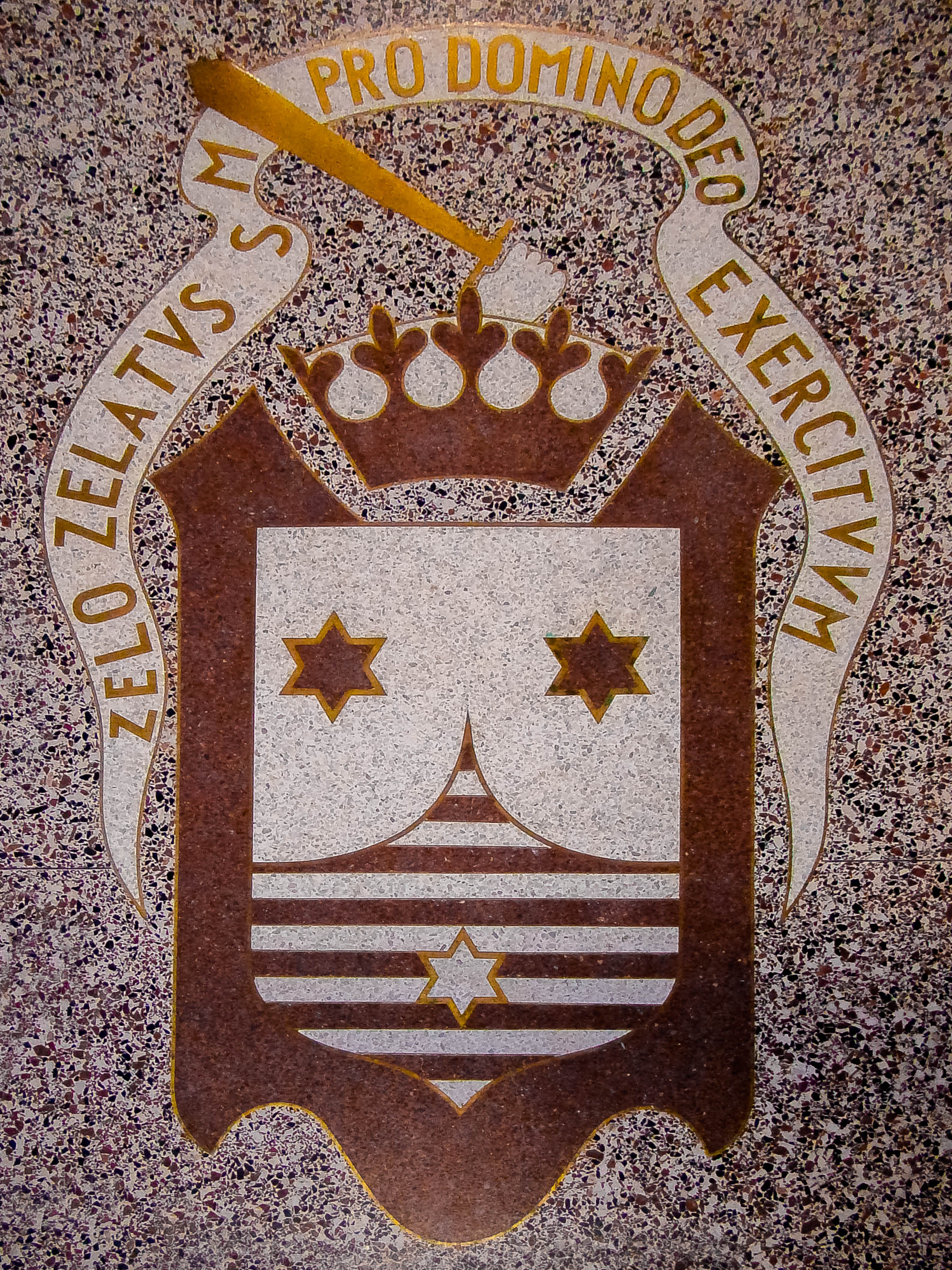
Mount Carmel High School original crest (shown upon school entrance) Photo taken on last day of classes, May 2008.

Mount Carmel High School was a private, Roman Catholic high school in Houston, Texas, United States. Founded in 1956 by the Carmelite order, Mount Carmel was the first Houston area Catholic high school established east of downtown and the first to serve greater Southeast Houston. From 1986 to 2008, it was administered by the Roman Catholic Archdiocese of Galveston-Houston.

== History ==
Mount Carmel was established in 1956 by priests of the Order of the Carmelites. The then-Diocese of Galveston-Houston took over administration of the school in 1986 when the Carmelite order that founded the school relinquished ownership. It was the only diocesan-operated high school in Houston until its closing. Over 5,000 students have graduated from Mount Carmel High School.

The school's motto's was "Zelo zelatus sum pro domino deo exercituum," which is Latin for "With zeal I have been zealous for the Lord, God of Hosts". This could be seen on the original school shield, which was laid in the floor in the entrance of the building. The second school motto was "Non Licet Nobis Esse Mediocribus" ("It is not permitted for us to be mediocre") and was included on the back side of the shield.

Mount Carmel was in the process of making renovations to its facility and had spent a large quantity of money repairing the air conditioning and plumbing systems in the fall semester of 2007. On April 25, 2008, about a month before the end of the school year, the Archdiocese of Galveston-Houston announced that the school would be closed at the end of the semester, saying it was too costly to renovate and maintain the school. At several meetings with the students, parents, faculty and board members on April 25, 2008 and several days afterward, the archdiocese stated that it would take measures to help relocate the students to other Catholic high schools. The diocese stated it would make up the difference in tuition between Mount Carmel and any other Catholic school to which the students were accepted, for one year. After the first year, parents would be responsible for paying the entire tuition at their respective schools. Mount Carmel High School closed on May 28, 2008. Cristo Rey Jesuit College Preparatory of Houston began operations in the former Mount Carmel facility in fall 2009.

== Location ==
Mount Carmel High School was situated in Southeast Houston just north of Sims Bayou adjacent to Garden Villas. It was less than 3 miles from Hobby Airport and was within the physical boundaries of Sterling High School. The campus and facilities at 6700 Mt Carmel Dr are now being used by Cristo Rey Jesuit.

== Feeder schools ==
A majority of students came from various private, Catholic, and parochial grade schools in the greater Southeast Houston, including adjacent Our Lady of Mount Carmel, Our Lady of Guadalupe, Queen of Peace, St. Augustine, St. Christopher, St. Peter the Apostle, St. Pius V, among others. Students from area public schools also often chose to apply for admission for their freshman year.

== Athletics ==
Mount Carmel was one of many Catholic high schools that originally competed in the now defunct T.C.I.L. (Texas Christian Interscholastic League). The league began in 1935 under the direction of Albert Mitchell (then principal of Central Catholic, San Antonio). Mount Carmel later competed in the Texas Association of Private and Parochial Schools (TAPPS).

=== State Championships ===
T.C.I.L (4A)

Boys Basketball 1969; Boys Basketball 1973; Girls Basketball 1978; Girls Basketball 1980; Girls Basketball 1981; Baseball 1975

Mount Carmel Highschool, Houston, Texas, won TCIL State Championships in Track three consecutive years (1966 to 1968).

== Notable alumni ==
- Glenn Bujnoch, former National Football League (NFL) offensive lineman who played from 1976 through 1984 for the Cincinnati Bengals and Tampa Bay Buccaneers.
- Mark Ross, former Major League Baseball (MLB) pitcher. He pitched between 1982 until 1990 for the Houston Astros, Pittsburgh Pirates and Toronto Blue Jays.
- Rick Noriega, a former American politician and retired major general in the Texas Army National Guard who is currently director of Harris County Universal Services (HCUS). From 1998 to 2009, Noriega was a Democratic member of the Texas House of Representatives for District 145, representing eastern portions of Houston.

== See also ==
- Christianity in Houston
- Mount Carmel Academy, which took students from the former school
- Cristo Rey Jesuit College Preparatory of Houston, which took over the facilities from Mount Carmel
