= St. Mary Cathedral Basilica (Galveston, Texas) =

Historic church in Texas, United States

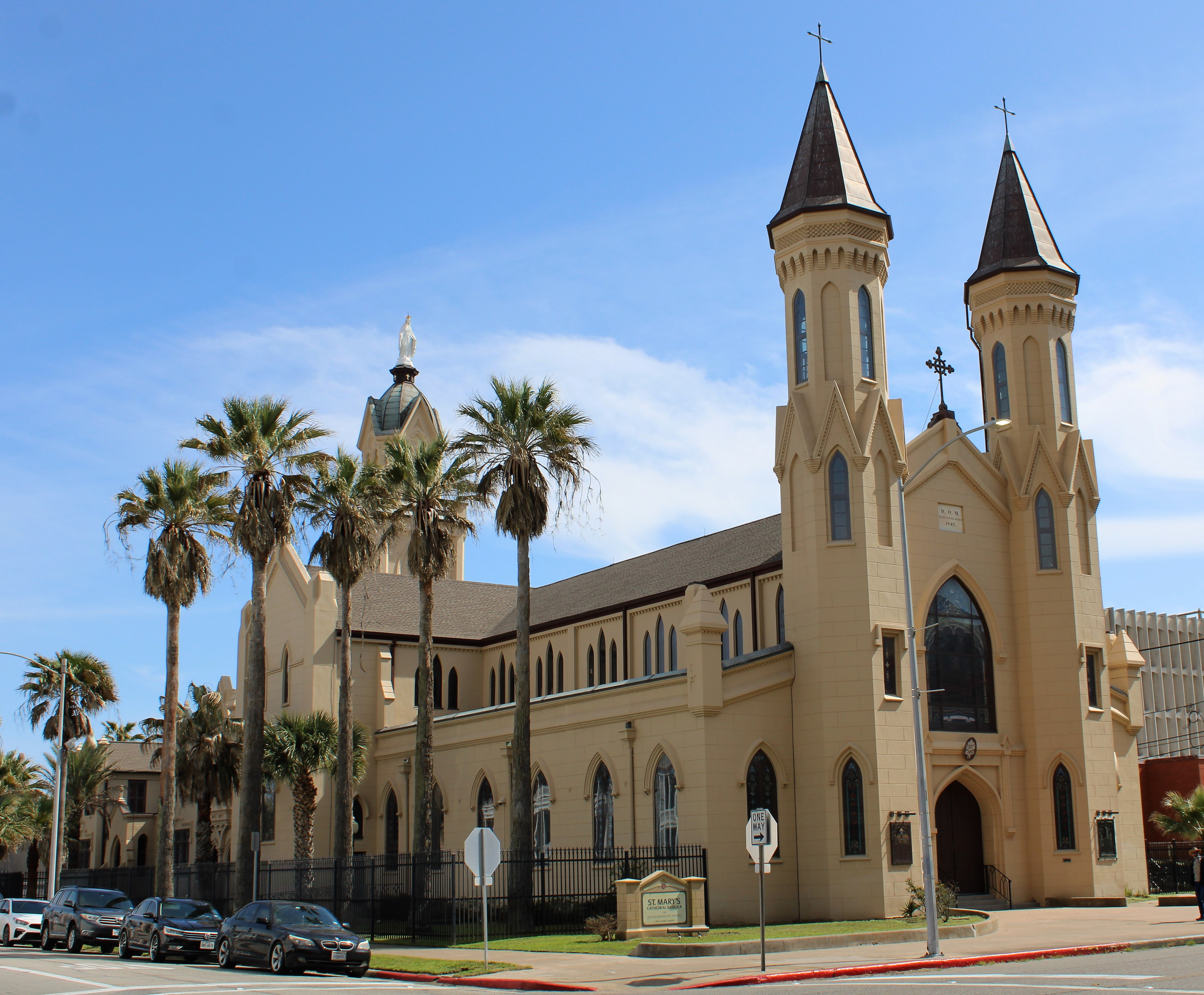
- St. Mary Cathedral Basilica in 2023
- St. Mary Cathedral Basilica
- 29°18′15″N 94°47′25″W
- Location: 2011 Church St. Galveston, Texas
- Country: United States
- Denomination: Roman Catholic
- Website: St. Mary Cathedral Basilica

History
- Status: Cathedral - Minor Basilica
- Dedication: Blessed Virgin Mary
- Consecrated: November 26, 1848

Architecture
- Architect(s): Theodore Eugene Giraud, with later addition by Nicholas J. Clayton
- Architectural type: Gothic
- Groundbreaking: 1843
- Completed: 1847

Specifications
- Capacity: 400+
- Length: 40 meters (130 ft)
- Width: 23 meters (75 ft)
- Materials: Imported Belgian brick and mortar

Administration
- Archdiocese: Galveston-Houston
- Parish: Holy Family

Clergy
- Archbishop: Most Rev. Joe S. Vásquez
- St. Mary's Cathedral
- U.S. National Register of Historic Places
- Recorded Texas Historic Landmark
- NRHP reference No.: 73001964
- RTHL No.: 7172

Significant dates
- Added to NRHP: June 4, 1973
- Designated RTHL: 1967

St. Mary Cathedral Basilica is a Catholic cathedral in Galveston, Texas. It is the primary cathedral of the Archdiocese of Galveston-Houston and the mother church of Catholics in Texas. Along with the Co-Cathedral of the Sacred Heart in Houston, Texas, St. Mary's serves over 1.5 million Catholics living in the archdiocese.

The first church in Galveston, St. Mary, started as a small wooden building in 1842. It was replaced in 1848 by the current structure, which became a cathedral when it was dedicated. St. Mary was spared significant damage during the hurricane of 1900, but was flooded during Hurricane Ike in 2008. After six years of repairs and renovations, it reopened in 2014. St. Mary was elevated to the state of a minor basilica in 1979. St. Mary became part of Holy Family Parish in 2009.

== History ==
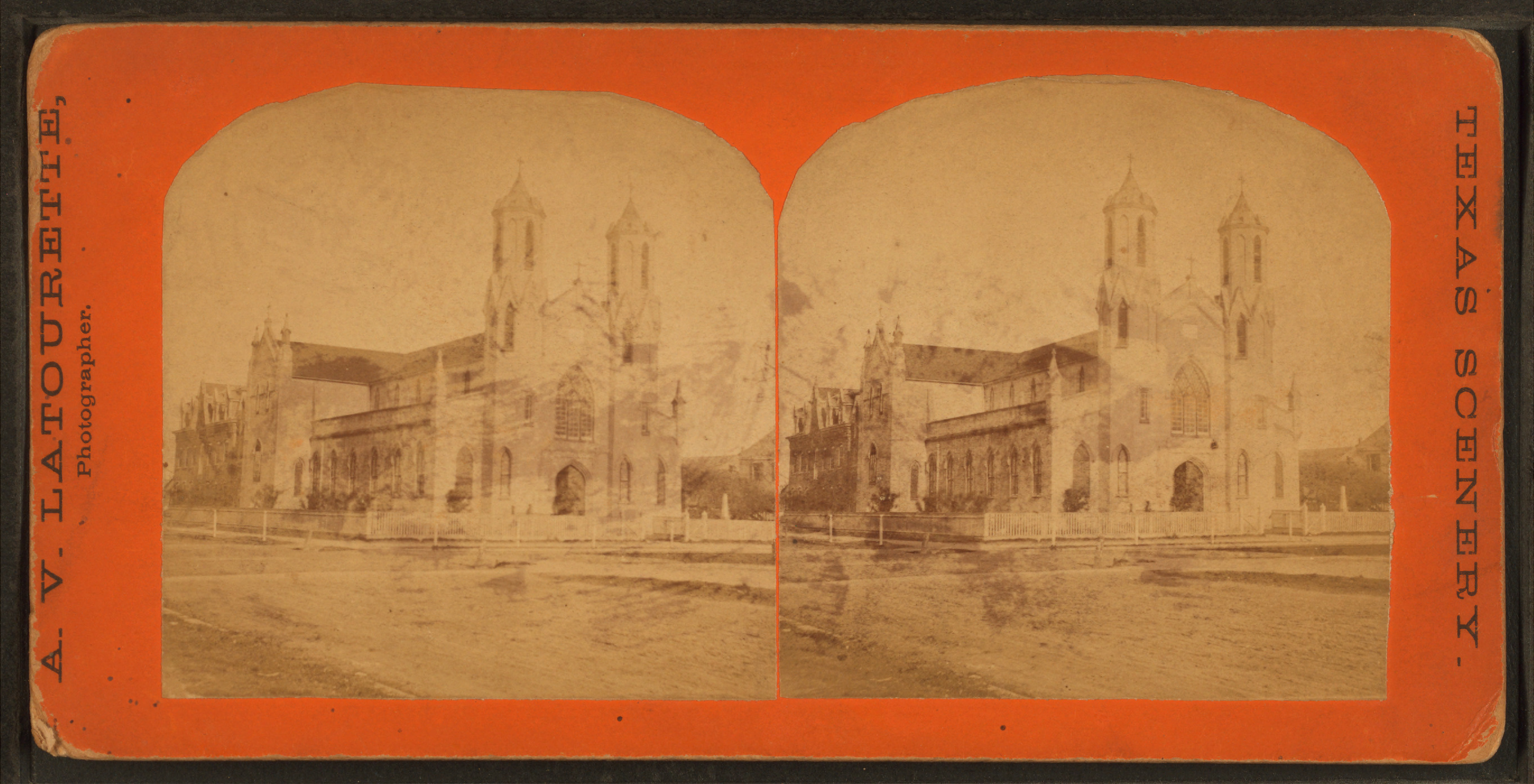
St. Mary Cathedral (circa 1865)

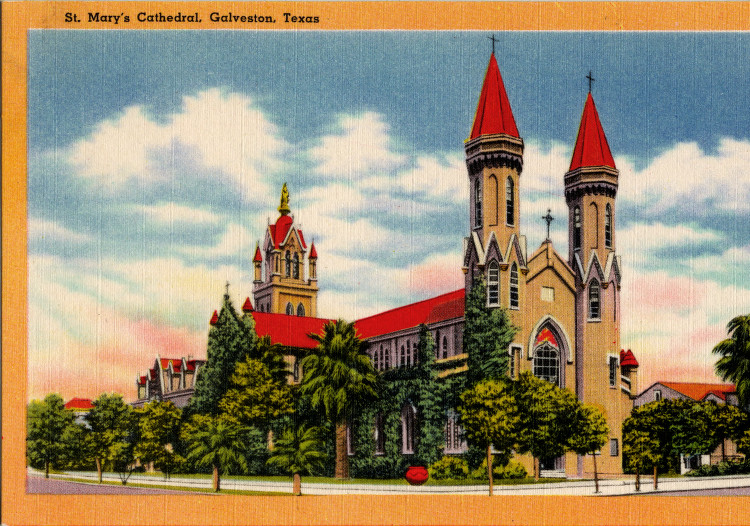
St. Mary Cathedral (circa 1890–1924)

=== 1836 to 1848 ===
With the end of the Texas Revolution in 1836, most of present-day Texas became part of the new Republic of Texas. Acknowledging this reality, Pope Gregory XVI in 1840 transferred the jurisdiction for Texas Catholics from a diocese in Mexico to the new Apostolic Prefecture of Texas. The pope named Reverend John Timon as the apostolic prefect of Texas.

To assist him, Timon named Jean-Marie Odin, a titular bishop, to be the resident vice-prefect and assigned him to start a parish in Galveston. Odin sailed from New Orleans, Louisiana, to Galveston, arriving in early 1841. In the following months, Odin procured enough funding to begin construction of a wooden-frame church. He was assisted by Colonel Michel Branamour Menard, the founder of Galveston, and Dr. Nicholas Labadie. On February 6, 1842, Odin dedicated St. Mary Church. The small, rectangular building measured 22 feet (6.7 m).

In July 1841, Gregory XVI converted the Apostolic Prefecture of Texas into the Apostolic Vicariate and named Odin as the apostolic vicar. He purchased a five-room cottage to serve as his the episcopal residence. He added a small sacristy to St. Mary Church and bought thirty benches for the parishioners.

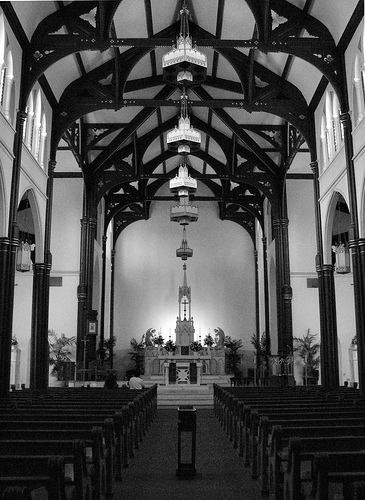
Sanctuary, St. Mary Cathedral Basilica (2007)

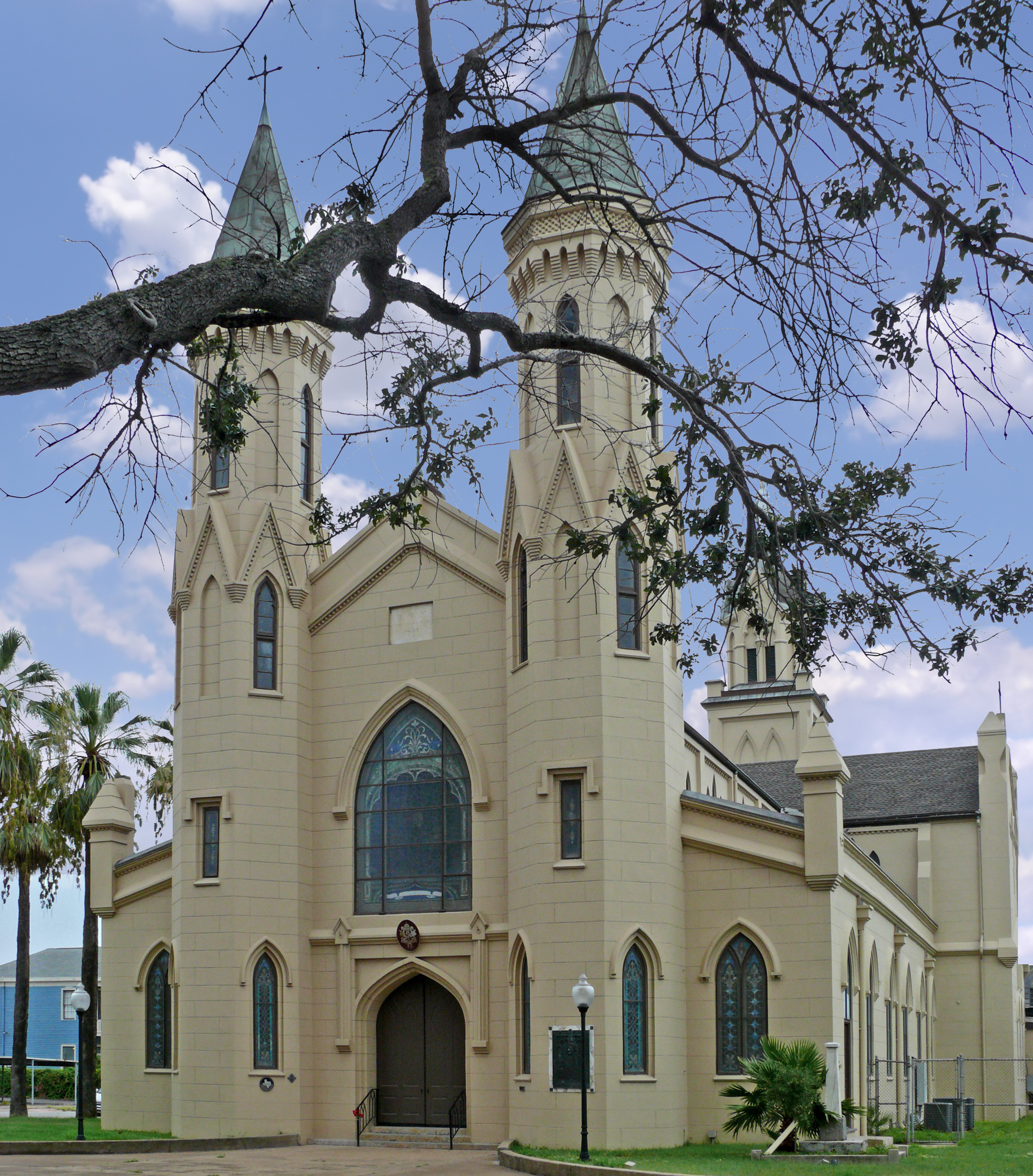
St Mary Cathedral Basilica (2012)

By1845, Odin had started planning a permanent replacement for the wooden church. To that end, he purchased 500,000 bricks from Belgium,shipped to Galveston as ballast in the bottom of a ship. On March 14, 1847, Timon returned to Galveston to the laying of the cornerstone for the new church.

Recognizing the strong growth of the Catholic population in Texas, Pope Pius IX erected the Diocese of Galveston on May 4, 1847, and named Odin as its first bishop.The new St. Mary Church, when completed, would become St. Mary Cathedral.

=== 1848 to 1950 ===
On November 26, 1848, Timon dedicated St. Mary Cathedral.The diocese in 1876 erected a transept tower on the cathedral, then in 1878 installed a cast-iron statue of Mary, Star of the Sea on the tower. It was reported that sailors used the lit crown on the statute as a navigation aid for entering the Port of Galveston. The diocese raised the two spires at the front of the cathedral in 1886 to 80 feet (24 m), with crosses installed on their tops.

The 1900 Galveston hurricane was a category 4 hurricane that devastated most of the buildings in Galveston. However, St. Mary Cathedral survived the storm with minimal damage.

=== 1950 to present ===
In 1959, due to the tremendous growth in the Houston, Pope John XXIII changed the Diocese of Galveston to the Diocese of Galveston-Houston. Bishop Wendelin J. Nold then designated Sacred Heart Church in Houston to be the "co-cathedral" of the diocese. Sacred Heart Co-Cathedral now became equal in status to St. Mary Cathedral.

St. Mary Cathedral was named a Texas state historic landmark in 1968 and a national historic landmark in 1973. In 1979, Pope John Paul II elevated St. Mary Cathedral to the status of a minor basilica. It was now called St. Mary Cathedral Basilica. In December 2004, Pope John Paul II raised the Diocese of Galveston-Houston to the Archdiocese of Galveston-Houston, with Joseph Fiorenza as its first archbishop.

When Hurricane Ike hit the Texas coast in 2008, over 5 feet (1.5 m) of water flooded St. Mary's Cathedral Basilica, forcing its closure for the next six years for major repairs. In 2009, the archdiocese appointed a director of special projects to oversee St. Mary's restoration. On the exterior, contractors replaced the roof and add steel armature reinforcements to the two front spires. The exterior masonry was repaired, recoated and underwent chemical remediation. Inside the building, they rebuilt the pews and refinished them, along with the confessionals and stations of the cross. The contractor replaced the original wood beams under the cathedral with a concrete substructure.

In 2009, the eight parishes on Galveston Island and the Bolivar Peninsula, including St. Mary's, were combined into the new Holy Family Parish. The worship locations included St. Mary's and five other churches.

St. Mary's Cathedral Basilica was rededicated on March 25, 2014. The archdiocese in 2019 removed the Mary, Star of the Sea statue from the cathedral roof for restoration. Contractors also repaired the two spires and some of the stained glass windows. They also fixed the tower bell, which had been inoperable since 2010. In 2020, the statue was reinstalled on the tower.

== See also ==
- National Register of Historic Places listings in Galveston County, Texas
- Recorded Texas Historic Landmarks in Galveston County
- List of Catholic cathedrals in the United States
- List of cathedrals in the United States
