= American Subcontractors Association =

Logo of the American Subcontractors Association.

Founded in 1966, the American Subcontractors Association, Inc., is an IRS section 501(c)(6) non-profit, national, membership trade association of construction specialty trade contractors, suppliers, and service providers in the United States and Canada. It charters local chapters and state organizations across the United States, and its national headquarters is located in Alexandria, Virginia.

== See also ==
- Voluntary association
- Subcontractor
