= Cristo Rey Jesuit College Preparatory of Houston =

Location
- 6700 Mount Carmel Drive; Houston, Harris, Texas 77087; United States
- 29°39′49″N 95°15′31″W

Information
- Type: Private, coeducational
- Religious affiliations: Roman Catholic, Jesuit
- Established: 2009; 17 years ago
- Founder: Fr. T. J. Martinez, S.J.
- President: Fr. Randy Gibbens, SJ
- Principal: Blanca Loya
- Grades: 9–12
- Colors: Orange, white, and marigold
- Athletics: Boys and girls soccer, girls volleyball, football, baseball, softball, boys and girls basketball, golf, cross country, and track and field.
- Mascot: Lion
- Affiliation: Cristo Rey Network
- Website: CristoReyJesuit

Cristo Rey Jesuit College Preparatory of Houston is a Roman Catholic secondary school located on 6700 Mount Carmel Drive in Houston, Texas, United States. It was founded by the New Orleans Province of the Society of Jesus and continues to be a sponsored work of the Jesuits. It is a part of the Cristo Rey Network and also affiliated with the Roman Catholic Archdiocese of Galveston-Houston. Father T. J. Martinez, S.J., was the founding president.

The school was opened in August 2009, on the campus of the former Mount Carmel High School. Like other Cristo Rey schools, students help pay for their tuition through a work-study program. All 60 of the school's first senior class graduated and were accepted into colleges, from the University of Texas to Georgetown.

Cristo Rey Jesuit, along with The Chinquapin School and Yellowstone Academy, is one of the few Greater Houston private schools that serve exclusively low income students. In 2016 the racial mix of the student body was: 78.3% Hispanic, 15.2% African American, and 3.5% mixed race.

== The Corporate Work-Study Program ==
The Corporate Work-Study Program provides students with the opportunity to receive a university-preparatory education while providing real-world work experience. Cristo Rey Jesuit students spend between one and two days each week at a major corporation in an entry-level job. The salary earned pays for approximately 70% of their tuition at Cristo Rey Jesuit.

== Sports and extra-curricular activities ==
Cristo Rey Jesuit sponsors teams in cross country, tennis, and football, as well as for girls: soccer, basketball, volleyball, softball, and golf; and for boys: soccer, basketball, baseball, volleyball, and golf. It is a member of the Texas Christian Athletic League. Clubs and other activities include the areas of theater, chess, art, books, service, garden, woods (hiking, camping, environmentalism), Ambassadors (receive guests), Hearts on Fire, and National Honor Society. Clubs and activities depend on student interest and availability of sponsors. Cristo Rey Houston was one of three schools chosen nationally by the Center for the Advancement of Science in Space for inclusion of its experiments in the International Space Station in 2014. In the 2017–2018 school year, it was announced that it would be the last year of the flag football team, and the following school year, football would be implemented in its place.

However, students' first commitment on the days they work is to their corporate sponsor; they may not miss work to participate in sporting events or other activities. Likewise, students who are struggling academically will be placed in tutoring and may be unable to participate in extra-curricular opportunities until they are able to improve their academic performance.
