= List of cathedrals in Texas =

This is a list of cathedrals in the state of Texas, United States:

Municipality	Cathedral	Image	Location & References
Amarillo	St. Mary's Cathedral (Roman Catholic)		35°12′11″N 101°50′56″W
Austin	St. Mary's Cathedral (Roman Catholic)		30°16′16″N 97°44′23″W
Beaumont	Saint Anthony Cathedral Basilica (Roman Catholic)		30°04′40″N 94°06′03″W
Bedford (Fort Worth area)	St. Vincent's Cathedral (Anglican Church in North America)		32°49′53″N 97°08′27″W
Brownsville	Immaculate Conception Cathedral (Roman Catholic)		25°54′09″N 97°29′46″W
Corpus Christi	Corpus Christi Cathedral (Roman Catholic)		27°47′40″N 97°23′47″W
Dallas	Cathedral Church of the Holy Communion (Anglican/Reformed Episcopal)		32°59′23″N 96°49′21″W
Dallas	Cathedral of Our Lady of Guadalupe (Roman Catholic)		32°47′19″N 96°47′51″W
Dallas	Cathedral Church of Saint Matthew (Episcopal)		32°48′30″N 96°46′21″W
Dallas	St. Seraphim of Sarov Cathedral (Orthodox Church in America)		32°49′10″N 96°48′14″W
El Paso	St. Patrick Cathedral (Roman Catholic)		31°45′56″N 106°29′35″W
El Paso	St. Francis Cathedral (Anglican)		31°49′01″N 106°31′47″W
Fort Worth	Saint Patrick Cathedral (Roman Catholic)		32°44′57″N 97°19′47″W
Galveston	St. Mary's Cathedral Basilica (Roman Catholic)		29°18′15″N 94°47′24″W
Houston	Sacred Heart Co-Cathedral (Roman Catholic)		29°44′58″N 95°22′07″W
Houston	Christ Church Cathedral (Episcopal)		29°45′34″N 95°21′41″W
Houston	Annunciation Cathedral (Greek Orthodox)		29°44′27″N 95°23′33″W
Houston	Cathedral of Our Lady of Walsingham (Personal Ordinariate of the Chair of Saint Peter-Catholic Church)		29°47′45″N 95°29′00″W
Laredo	Cathedral of San Agustin (Roman Catholic)		27°30′09″N 99°30′20″W
Lubbock	Christ the King Cathedral (Roman Catholic)		33°32′35″N 101°53′56″W
Plano	Christ Church Cathedral (Anglican Church in North America)		33°04′13″N 96°47′02″W
San Angelo	Sacred Heart Cathedral (Roman Catholic)		31°27′49″N 100°26′07″W
San Antonio	Cathedral of San Fernando (Roman Catholic)		29°25′28″N 98°29′39″W
San Antonio	Procathedral of St. Chad of Lichfield (Anglican Province of America)		
Spring (Houston area)	St. Timothy's Anglican Church (Anglican Church in North America)		30°01′24″N 95°31′05″W
Stafford (Houston area)	St. Thomas Indian Orthodox Cathedral (Malankara Orthodox) (Oriental Orthodox communion)		29°36′23″N 95°32′45″W
Tyler	Cathedral of the Immaculate Conception (Roman Catholic)		32°20′47″N 95°18′03″W
Victoria	Our Lady of Victory Cathedral (Roman Catholic)		28°49′27″N 96°59′32″W

== See also ==
- List of cathedrals in the United States
