= Wendelin Joseph Nold =

American Catholic prelate (1900–1981)

His Excellency, The Most Reverend Wendelin Joseph Nold
- Bishop of Galveston-Houston; Titular Bishop of Sasima
- Church: Roman Catholic Church
- See: Diocese of Galveston-Houston
- In office: April 1, 1950 - April 22, 1975
- Predecessor: Christopher Edward Byrne
- Successor: John Louis Morkovsky
- Other posts: Coadjutor Bishop of Galveston; 1948–1950

Orders
- Ordination: April 11, 1925 by Giuseppe Palica
- Consecration: February 25, 1948 by Joseph Patrick Lynch, Christopher Edward Byrne, and Augustine Danglmayr

Personal details
- Born: January 18, 1900 Bonham, Texas, U.S.
- Died: October 1, 1981 (aged 81) Houston, Texas, U.S.
- Education: Saint Mary's Seminary; Pontifical North American College
- Motto: Serviam (They served)

Styles of Wendelin Joseph Nold
- Reference style: His Excellency; The Most Reverend
- Spoken style: Your Excellency
- Religious style: Bishop

Wendelin Joseph Nold (January 18, 1900 – October 1, 1981) was an American prelate of the Roman Catholic Church. He served as bishop of the Diocese of Galveston-Houston in Texas from 1950 to 1975. He previously served as coadjutor bishop of Galveston from 1948 to 1950.

== Early life ==
Wendelin Joseph Nold was born on January 18, 1900, in Bonham, Texas, to Wendelin Joseph and Mary Elizabeth (née Charles) Nold. After attending parochial schools in Cleburne and Fort Worth, he studied at St. Mary's Seminary in La Porte, from where he obtained a Bachelor of Arts degree in 1921. He then furthered his studies at the Pontifical North American College in Rome, and there earned a Doctorate in Sacred Theology in 1925.

== Priesthood ==
While in Rome, Nold was ordained to the priesthood by Archbishop Giuseppe Palica for the Diocese of Dallas on April 11, 1925. Upon his return to Texas, Nold served as a curate at Sacred Heart Cathedral Parish in Dallas, and became the first pastor of Christ the King Parish in Dallas in 1941.

In addition to his pastoral duties, Nold also served in the chancery as a consultor, synodal judge, synodal examiner, director of the Confraternity of Christian Doctrine, and director of Catholic Action. The Vatican elevated Nold to the rank of papal chamberlain in 1936, domestic prelate in 1942, and protonotary apostolic in 1946.

== Coadjutor Bishop and Bishop of Galveston-Houston ==
On November 29, 1947, Nold was appointed coadjutor bishop of Galveston and titular bishop of Sasima by Pope Pius XII. He received his episcopal consecration on February 25, 1948, from Bishop Joseph Lynch, with Bishops Christopher Byrne and Augustine Danglmayr serving as co-consecrators. After Byrne's death on April 1, 1950, Nold automatically became the fifth bishop of Galveston. He was the first native Texan to hold that office.

Due to the tremendous growth in the City of Houston, the Vatican allowed Nold in 1959 to designate Sacred Heart Church in Houston as a co-cathedral. The diocese now had two cathedrals: Sacred Heart Cathedral in Houston and St. Mary's Cathedral Basilica in Galveston. The Vatican renamed the diocese as the Diocese of Galveston-Houston on July 25, 1959.

In 1959, Nold suffered a heart attack. Around that same time, he started suffering from kidney disease. In September 1961, Nold ordered that all Catholic schools in the diocese be racially integrated. During a hospitalization in 1963, he went blind. Later that year the Vatican appointed Bishop John Morkovsky in 1963 as coadjutor bishop, in charge of administering the diocese. Nold attended the Second Vatican Council in Rome from 1962 to 1965. During his tenure he established forty-seven parishes and fourteen missions, as well as several schools.

== Retirement and death ==
On April 22, 1975, Pope Paul VI accepted Nold's resignation as bishop of Galveston-Houston. Nold died in Houston on October 1, 1981, at age 81.

Catholic Church titles
Preceded by Christopher Edward Byrne	Bishop of Galveston-Houston; 1950–1975	Succeeded by John Louis Morkovsky
