= David Eugene Fellhauer =

American Catholic prelate (1939–2026)

His Excellency, The Most Reverend David Eugene Fellhauer
- Bishop of Victoria in Texas
- Church: Catholic
- Diocese: Victoria in Texas
- Appointed: April 7, 1990
- Installed: May 28, 1990
- Retired: April 23, 2015
- Predecessor: Charles Victor Grahmann
- Successor: Brendan J. Cahill
- Other post: Bishop Emeritus of Victoria in Texas (2015‍–‍2026)

Orders
- Ordination: May 29, 1965 by Egidio Vagnozzi
- Consecration: May 28, 1990 by Patrick Flores, Thomas Ambrose Tschoepe, and Charles Victor Grahmann

Personal details
- Born: August 19, 1939 Kansas City, Missouri, U.S.
- Died: March 3, 2026 (aged 86)
- Education: Pontifical College Josephinum; Saint Paul University
- Motto: To witness the charity of Christ

Styles of David Eugene Fellhauer
- Reference style: His Excellency; The Most Reverend
- Spoken style: Your Excellency
- Religious style: Bishop

David Eugene Fellhauer (August 19, 1939 – March 3, 2026) was an American Catholic prelate who served as Bishop of Victoria in Texas from 1990 to 2015.

== Biography ==
=== Early life ===
David Fellhauer was born on August 19, 1939, in Kansas City, Missouri, to Harold E. and Helen R. Francis Fellhauer. He attended primary school at St. Agnes School in Roeland Park, Kansas, then went to the Pontifical College Josephinum in Columbus, Ohio, for high school, college and seminary training.

=== Priesthood ===
On May 29, 1965, Fellhauer was ordained to the priesthood by Cardinal Egidio Vagnozzi for the Diocese of Dallas-Fort Worth. In 1979, he obtained his Doctor of Canon Law degree from Saint Paul University in Ottawa, Ontario.

Fellhauer was named as assistant judicial vicar (vice-officialis), for the diocese in 1975. He was appointed judicial vicar in 1979, a role he would fulfill until his appointment as bishop in 1990.

=== Bishop of Victoria ===
On April 19, 1990, Pope John Paul II appointed Fellhauer as the second bishop of the Diocese of Victoria. He received his episcopal consecration at Our Lady of Victory Cathedral in Victoria on May 28 from Archbishop Patrick Flores, with Bishops Thomas Tschoepe and Charles Grahmann serving as co-consecrators.

On August 9, 1994, The Dallas Morning News reported that in 1984 Fellhauer, then serving as judicial vicar, agreed to accept Robert Peebles Jr. as a parish priest in the Diocese of Dallas-Fort Worth. This was despite the knowledge that Peebles had been dishonorably discharged from the US Army for sexually abusing an altar boy while serving as an Army chaplain. Peebles abused three more children in the diocese before being laicized in 1989. When asked to comment about the article in 1994, Fellhauer said: "We made the best decision at the time in view of the circumstances."

Within the United States Conference of Catholic Bishops, Fellhauer chaired the Committee on Canonical Affairs. In 1998, Fellhauer received the Role of Law award from the Canon Law Society of America.

=== Retirement and death ===
When Fellhauer reached the retirement age of 75 for bishops, the pope accepted his letter of resignation on April 23, 2015.

Fellhauer died on March 3, 2026, at the age of 86.

Catholic Church titles
| Preceded by Charles Victor Grahmann | Bishop of Victoria in Texas; 1990–2015 | Succeeded by Brendan J. Cahill |
