= Petrus de Natalibus =

Italian bishop and author

- Bishop of Equilio
- Church: Catholic Church
- Diocese: Diocese of Equilio
- In office: 5 July 1370 – 1400/1406
- Predecessor: Marco Bianco
- Successor: Angelo Scardoni

Pietro Ungarello di Marco de' Natali, better known as Petrus de Natalibus (d. 1400 x 1406), was an Italian bishop and the author of a collection of lives of the saints.

A Venetian, he consecrated himself to the ecclesiastical state, becoming a canon in Equilio (Jesolo). On 5 July 1370, he was elevated to the episcopal see of that city. Details are lacking regarding his pastoral activity. The last mention of him refers to the year 1400, and in 1406, another appears as Bishop of Equilio; the date of his decease, therefore, must be set between these two years

He is chiefly known as the author of Legends of the Saints in twelve books, a work with a wide circulation. In his arrangement of the various lives he follows the calendar of the Church. The collection, first printed in Vicenza, 1493, went through many editions, the last of which (the eighth) appeared in Venice, 1616.
