= Thomas Francis Brennan =

Irish Catholic prelate in the United States and Canada (1855–1916)

His Excellency, The Right Reverend Thomas Francis Brennan
- Auxiliary Bishop of St. John's, Newfoundland
- Church: Catholic
- Diocese: St. John's, Newfoundland
- Appointed: February 1, 1893
- Term ended: October 7, 1905
- Other post: Titular Bishop of Caesarea in Mauretania (1905–1916)
- Previous post: Bishop of Dallas (1891–1892)

Orders
- Ordination: July 4, 1880 by Johannes von Leiss
- Consecration: April 5, 1891 by Tobias Mullen

Personal details
- Born: October 10, 1855 Ballycullin, County Tipperary, Ireland
- Died: March 20, 1916 (aged 60) Grottaferrata, Lazio, Italy
- Education: St. Bonaventure College; University of Rouen; University of Innsbruck

Thomas Francis Brennan (October 10, 1855 – March 20, 1916) was an Irish-born prelate of the Catholic Church. He served as the first bishop of the Diocese of Dallas in Texas from 1891 to 1892 before serving as an auxiliary bishop of the Diocese of St. John's in the British Colony of Newfoundland from 1893 to 1905.

Brennan's controversial actions and poor relations with clergy in both Dallas and St. John's led the Vatican to remove him as bishop from both posts and eventually place him in a monastery.

== Biography ==
=== Early life ===
Brennan was born on October 10, 1855, in Ballycullin near Mullinahone, County Tipperary, in Ireleand, the youngest of five sons of James and Margaret (née Dunne) Brennan. James Brennan, a teacher and land surveyor, died in 1865. After his father' death, Brennan immigrated to the United States with his mother and brothers, settling in Pennsylvania. His brother James would also become a priest.

Brennan attended St. Bonaventure College in Allegany, New York, to prepare himself for the priesthood. He was sent to France in 1873 to continue his studies at the University of Rouen. From there, Brennan went to Austria and enrolled at the University of Innsbruck in 1876, graduating with the degree of Doctor of Divinity.

=== Priesthood ===
While still in Austria, Brennan was ordained for the priesthood for the Diocese of Erie on July 4, 1880, by Johannes von Leiss, the bishop of Brixen. Brennan spent one year studying canon law in Rome before returning to Pennsylvania.

Brennan's first assignment was as an assistant pastor, first at St. Michael Parish in Greenville. Pennsylvania, then St. Catherine of Siena Parish in DuBois, Pennsylvania, and finally St. Mary of the Assumption Parish in Frenchville, Pennsylvania. He succeed his brother James as pastor of St. James Parish in Driftwood, Pennsylvania, serving there until 1891. While at St. James, he also supervised mission churches at Sterling Run, Benezette, and Galeton, all in Pennsylvania. Brennan served as an examiner for the diocese from 1887 to 1891.

Brennan was named a chaplain of his holiness with the title of monsignor by Pope Leo XIII on January 11, 1888. That same year, Bishop Tobias Mullen sent him to Rome as a delegate to Pope Leo's golden jubilee celebration of his priestly ordination. During this trip. he met Bishop Thomas Heslin, who was impressed by Brennan's multilingual skills and recommended him as bishop a few years later.

=== Bishop of Dallas ===
Brennan was appointed by Leo XIII as the first bishop of the newly-erected Diocese of Dallas on December 22, 1890. He received his episcopal consecration on April 5, 1891, from Bishop Mullen, with Bishops Richard Phelan and Thomas McGovern serving as co-consecrators, at St. Peter Cathedral in Erie, Pennsylvania.

The Diocese of Dallas, consisting of 108,000 square miles. had been carved out of the Diocese of Galveston. Upon arriving in Dallas in April 1891, Brennan traveled widely and established a reputation as an exceptional orator. That same year, he created an official newspaper for the diocese, The Texas Catholic. During his brief tenure, Brennan built 12 churches, increased the number of priests by thirteen, and saw the Catholic population rise from 15,000 to 20,000.

The previous administrator of the Dallas area had taken on considerable debt. He had purchased a new property for $30,000 for Sacred Heart Church in Dallas, to be financed by the sale proceeds of the old church property. However, due to an economic depression in Dallas, the old property would not sell. Wanting to retire the debt, Brennan tried to use the Ursuline Academy of Dallas as collateral property for better financing. However, the Ursuline Sisters objected, saying that the property belonged to them, not the diocese. Brennan then tried to change the Ursuline Order constitution to allow him to get the academy property, but failed.

Brennan also faced opposition from many in the clergy and laity. They claimed that he was embezzling diocese funds for his personal use.The Texas Catholic was accused by Brennan's priests of being a publication "whose sole reason for existence seemed to be...to praise the bishop and his vicar general." Brennan lobbied for the Diocese of Dallas to be raised to the rank of an archdiocese. In a letter pleading his cause to the Congregation for the Propagation of the Faith, he argued for Dallas' elevation over the predominantly Spanish-speaking Diocese of San Antonio by saying such a decision would lead to the "foreignization of the Southwest."

By July 1892, Brennan's metropolitan superior, Archbishop Francis Janssens of New Orleans, had come to the conclusion that Brennan was "an impudent letter writer" and noted that "there are signs of much dissatisfaction on account of the arbitrary and uncanonical actions of the Bishop." The El Paso Times ran an article on November 2, 1892, that falsely claimed Brennan had been appointed an archbishop.

In November 1892, Brennan made his ad limina visit to Rome. At that time, Brennan offered his resignation as bishop of Dallas on November 17, 1892. Leo XIII accepted it on February 1, 1893. Brennan's vicar general in Dallas, his top assistant, also resigned. Leo XIII then appointed Brennan as an auxiliary bishop of the Diocese of Chicoutimi in Quebec. However, Bishop Michel-Thomas Labrecque rejected Brennan's appointment after learning about his history in Dallas.

=== Auxiliary Bishop of St. John's ===
In September 1893, Pope Pius X appointed Brennan as an auxiliary bishop of the Diocese of St. John's. In December 1893, after the death of Bishop Thomas Joseph Power, Brennan falsely claimed to be administrator of the diocese. However, he was overruled by Cardinal Mieczysław Halka-Ledóchowski.

Brennan's contentious relationship with the Newfoundland clergy led more than 20 priests to petition Ledóchowski in June 1894 to remove Brennan as auxiliary bishop.

=== Removal from office and legacy ===
Brennan was recalled to Rome in 1904, where he retired at age 50 to the Monastery of Grottaferrata. On October 7, 1905, he was officially relieved of his duties in Newfoundland and given the honorary title of titular bishop of Caesarea in Mauretania.

Thomas Brennan died at Grottaferrata, Lazio, in Italy on March 20, 1916, at age 62. He is buried in the cemetery of Frascati.

Catholic Church titles
Preceded by none	Bishop of Dallas; 1891–1892	Succeeded by Edward Joseph Dunne
