= Robert Milner Coerver =

American Roman Catholic clergyman (born 1954)

His Excellency, The Most Reverend Robert Milner Coerver
- Bishop of Lubbock
- Archdiocese: San Antonio
- Diocese: Lubbock
- Appointed: September 27, 2016
- Installed: November 21, 2016
- Predecessor: Plácido Rodriguez

Orders
- Ordination: June 27, 1980 by Thomas Ambrose Tschoepe
- Consecration: November 21, 2016 by Gustavo García-Siller, Gregory Kelly, and Plácido Rodriguez

Personal details
- Born: June 6, 1954 (age 72) Dallas, Texas, US
- Education: Pontifical Gregorian University; Texas A & M University–Commerce
- Motto: Suscipe Domine (Take it, Lord)

Styles of Robert Milner Coerver
- Reference style: His Excellency; The Most Reverend
- Spoken style: Your Excellency
- Religious style: Bishop

Robert Milner Coerver (born June 6, 1954) is an American Catholic prelate who has served as Bishop of Lubbock since 2016.

== Biography ==
=== Early life ===
Robert Coerver was born on June 6, 1954, in Dallas, Texas. He earned a Licentiate in Spiritual Theology from the Pontifical Gregorian University in Rome. He also received a Master of Counseling and Guidance degree from Texas A & M University–Commerce in Commerce, Texas.

=== Priesthood ===
On June 27, 1980, Coerver was ordained to the priesthood by Bishop Thomas Ambrose Tschoepe for the Diocese of Dallas at the Templo Expiatorio del Santísimo Sacramento in Guadalajara, Mexico.After his 1980 ordination, Coerver served as parochial vicar at the following parishes in Texas:

- Saint Elizabeth of Hungary in Dallas (1981 to 1982)
- Saint Elizabeth Seton in Plano (1982 to 1985)

Coerver left Saint Elizabeth Seton in 1985 after his appointment as director of spiritual formation at Holy Trinity Seminary on the campus of the University of Dallas. He was appointed as spirituality consultant to diocesan programs in 1996. In July 1997, Coerver was also named director of the Office of Sacramental Life for the diocese. In 2003, Coerver was appointed director of priestly life and ministry.

In December 2004, Pope John Paul II named Coerver a prelate of honor with the title "monsignor." In 2005, Coerver began serving as pastoral administrator at Our Lady of the Lake Parish in Rockwall Texas, becoming pastor there in 2006. He was transferred in July 2010 to serve as pastor of St. Rita Parish in Dallas.

=== Bishop of Lubbock ===
Pope Francis appointed Coerver as bishop of Lubbock on September 27, 2016. He was installed and consecrated by Archbishop Gustavo Garcia-Siller at Christ the King Cathedral in Lubbock on November 21, 2016, with Auxiliary Bishop Gregory Kelly and Bishop Plácido Rodriguez acting as co-consecrators.

On January 21, 2019, Coerver released a list of clerics with credible accusations of sexual abuse. One name on that list was that of Jesus Guerrero, a retired deacon who had been accused in 1997 and 2007 of having an inappropriate relationship with an adult female parishioner alleged to have mental problems. Guerrero sued the diocese in March 2019 for defamation, saying that he had never been accused of sexual abuse with a minor. When the state court refused to dismiss the case, the diocese appealed the decision to the Texas Supreme Court. The Supreme Court dismissed Guerrero's lawsuit in June 2021, citing the First Amendment rights under the US Constitution of churches to manage their own affairs.

== See also ==
- Catholic Church hierarchy
- Catholic Church in the United States
- Historical list of the Catholic bishops of the United States
- List of Catholic bishops of the United States
- Lists of patriarchs, archbishops, and bishops

Catholic Church titles
Preceded by Plácido Rodriguez	Bishop of Lubbock; 2016–present	Succeeded by Incumbent
