= Edward Joseph Dunne =

Irish-born prelate

His Excellency, The Right Reverend Edward Joseph Dunne
- Bishop of Dallas
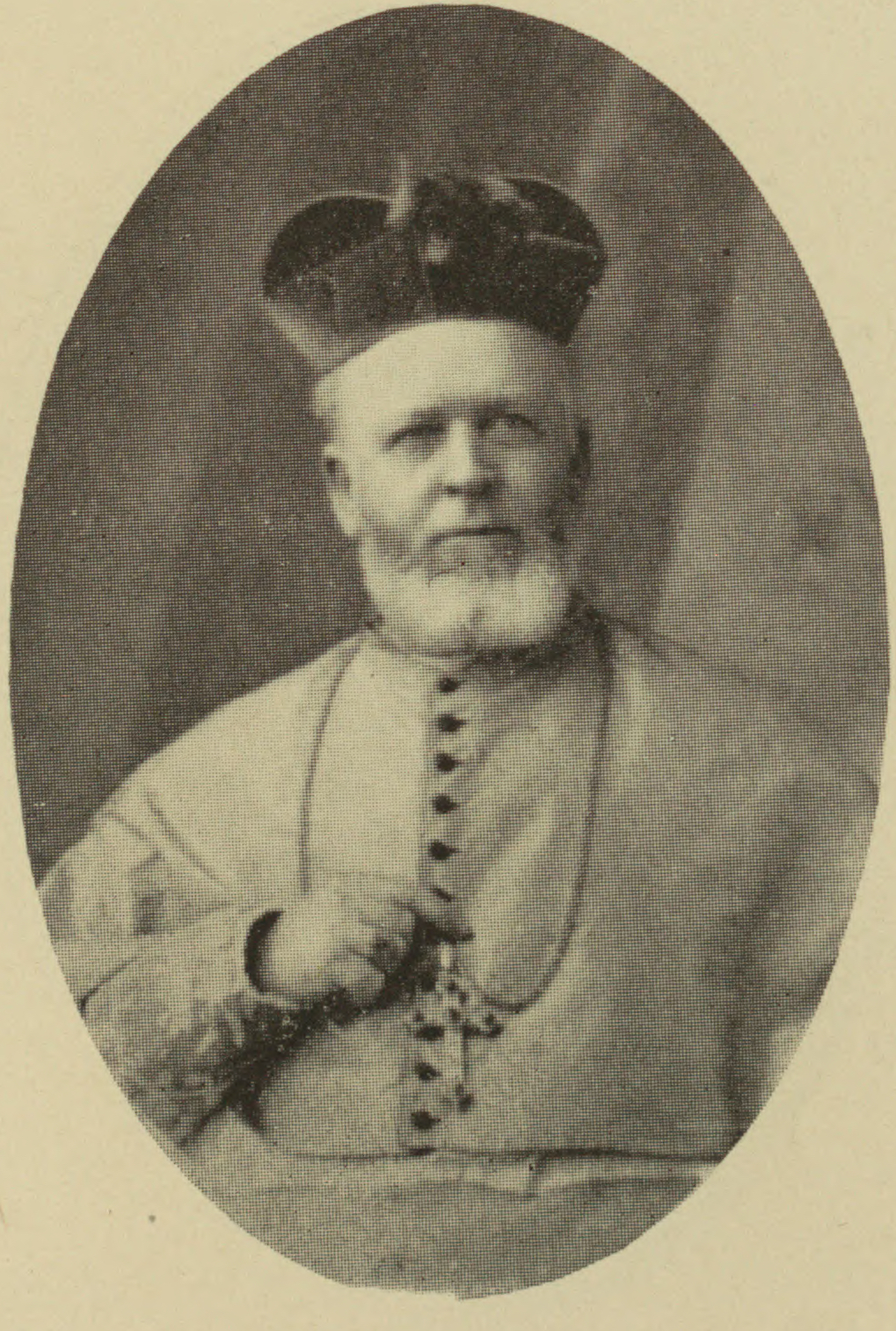
- Church: Roman Catholic Church
- See: Diocese of Dallas
- In office: November 30, 1893 to August 5, 1910
- Predecessor: Thomas Francis Brennan
- Successor: Joseph Patrick Lynch

Orders
- Ordination: June 29, 1871 by Thomas Andrew Becker
- Consecration: November 30, 1893 by Patrick Feehan

Personal details
- Born: April 23, 1848 Gortnahoe, County Tipperary, Ireland
- Died: August 5, 1910 (aged 62) Green Bay, Wisconsin, US
- Education: St. Mary's Seminary; St. Francis Seminary

Edward Joseph Dunne (April 23, 1848 – August 5, 1910) was an Irish-born prelate of the Catholic Church. He served as bishop of Dallas in Texas from 1894 until his death in 1910.

== Biography ==
=== Early life ===
Edward Dunne was born on April 23, 1848, in Gortnahoe, County Tipperary, to Richard and Judith (née Cooke) Dunne. At a young age, he and his parents immigrated to the United States, settling in Chicago, Illinois. Dunne studied at St. Francis Seminary in Milwaukee, Wisconsin, and then at St. Mary's Seminary in Baltimore, Maryland.

=== Priesthood ===
Dunne was ordained to the priesthood in Baltimore for the Archdiocese of Chicago by Bishop Thomas Becker on June 29, 1871.

On his return to Chicago, the archdiocese assigned Dunne as a curate at St. John's Parish in Chicago. He was transferred in 1873 to St. Mary's Parish, then in 1875 was named pastor of All Saints Parish, both in Chicago. Dunne build a church at All Saints in 1880 and a parochial school. He also served as financial overseer for the archdiocese.

In early 1884, Dunne was sent to St. Anthony of Padua Parish in San Antonio, Florida for health reasons. Spending six months in San Antonio, he was credited by The Catholic Review with advancing the development of a Catholic school. On April 29, 1884, largely due to Dunne's efforts, St. Anthony Catholic School was officially established and began holding formal classes in the parish church. Dunne returned to All Saints Parish in Chicago later in 1884.

=== Bishop of Dallas ===
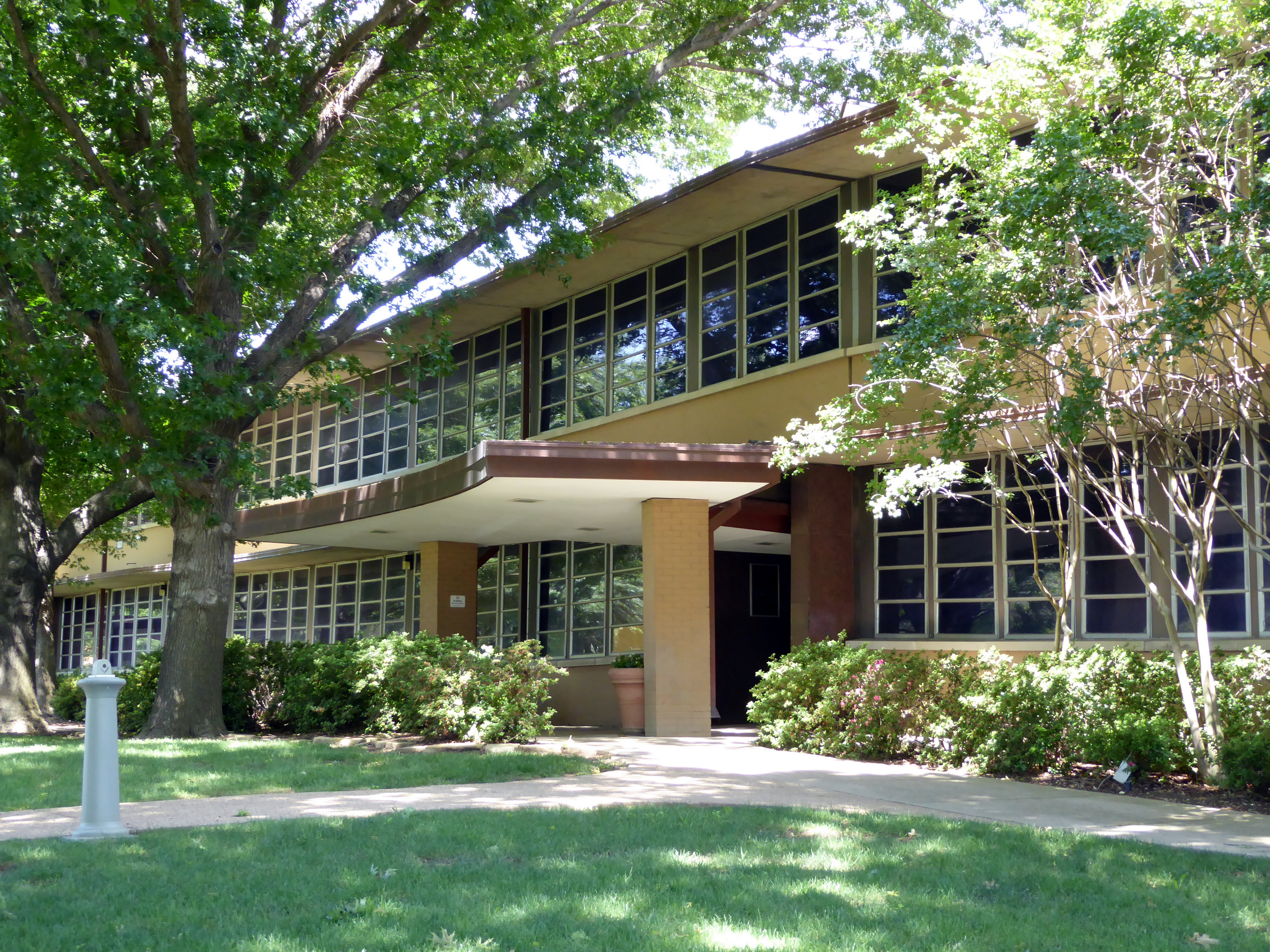
University of Dallas, Dallas, Texas (2018)

On September 24, 1893, Dunne was appointed the second bishop of Dallas by Pope Leo XIII. He received his episcopal consecration on November 30, 1893, from Archbishop Patrick Feehan, with Bishops James Ryan and John Samuel Foley serving as co-consecrators, at All Saints Church in Chicago. He was installed in Dallas in January 1894.

During his tenure, Dunne opened several educational institutions, including Holy Trinity College (today the University of Dallas). He established St. Paul Sanitarium in Dallas, and St. Anthony's Sanitarium, the first hospital in Amarillo. He also erected Sacred Heart Cathedral. During his sixteen years as bishop, the number of churches increased from 28 to 90, and the Catholic population tripled in size.

=== Death and legacy ===
Edward Dunne died from a heart attack while visiting a friend in Green Bay, Wisconsin, on August 5, 1910, at age 62. At his brother's request, Dunne was buried at Calvary Cemetery in Evanston, Illinois.

Catholic Church titles
Preceded by Thomas Francis Brennan	Bishop of Dallas; 1894–1910	Succeeded by Joseph Patrick Lynch
