= Michael Sheehan (archbishop of Santa Fe) =

American Catholic prelate (1939–2023)

His Excellency, The Most Reverend Michael Sheehan
- Archbishop of Santa Fe
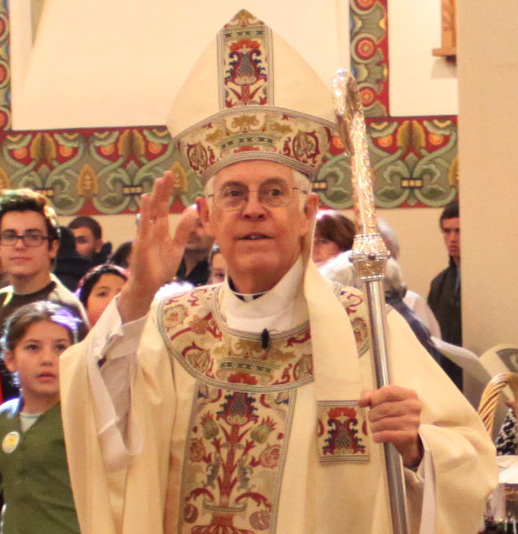
- Sheehan in 2013
- Archdiocese: Santa Fe
- Appointed: August 17, 1993
- Installed: September 21, 1993
- Term ended: April 27, 2015
- Predecessor: Robert Fortune Sanchez
- Successor: John Charles Wester
- Previous post: Bishop of Lubbock (1983–1993)

Orders
- Ordination: July 12, 1964
- Consecration: June 17, 1983 by Patrick Fernández Flores, Leroy Matthiesen, and Thomas Ambrose Tschoepe

Personal details
- Born: Michael Jarboe Sheehan; July 9, 1939 Wichita, Kansas
- Died: June 3, 2023 (aged 83) Albuquerque, New Mexico
- Denomination: Catholic
- Education: Assumption Seminary; Pontifical Gregorian University; Pontifical Lateran University
- Motto: Love one another constantly
- Styles
- Reference style: His Excellency; The Most Reverend
- Spoken style: Your Excellency
- Religious style: Archbishop

Michael Jarboe Sheehan (July 9, 1939 – June 3, 2023) was an American Catholic prelate who served as the eleventh archbishop of the Archdiocese of Santa Fe in New Mexico from 1993 to 2015. He previously served as Bishop of Lubbock in Texas from 1983 to 1993.

== Biography ==
=== Early life ===
Michael Jarboe Sheehan was born on July 9, 1939, in Wichita, Kansas, to John and Mildred (née Jarboe) Sheehan, and raised in Texarkana, Texas. He attended St. John's High School Seminary and Assumption Seminary in San Antonio, Texas. He then furthered his studies in Rome at the Pontifical Gregorian University, where he obtained a Licentiate of Sacred Theology in 1965.

=== Priesthood ===
Sheehan was ordained to the priesthood for the Diocese of Dallas-Fort Worth in Rome on July 12, 1964. After his ordination, the diocese assigned Sheehan as parochial vicar at Immaculate Conception Parish in Tyler, Texas. Returning to Rome in 1968, he earned a doctorate in canon law from the Pontifical Lateran University in 1971. Sheehan served as assistant general secretary of the United States Conference of Catholic Bishops/United States Catholic Conference from 1971 to 1976, and as rector of Holy Trinity Seminary in Dallas, Texas from 1976 to 1982. In 1982, he was named pastor of Immaculate Conception Parish in Grand Prairie, Texas.

=== Bishop of Lubbock ===
On March 25, 1983, Sheehan was appointed the founding bishop of the Diocese of Lubbock by Pope John Paul II. He received his episcopal consecration at the Lubbock Memorial Civic Center in Lubbock on June 17, 1983, from Archbishop Patrick Flores, with Bishops Leroy Matthiesen and Thomas Tschoepe serving as co-consecrators. He selected as his episcopal motto: "Love One Another Constantly."

Following the resignation of Bishop Robert Sanchez, Sheehan became apostolic administrator of Santa Fe on April 6, 1993.

=== Archbishop of Santa Fe ===
Sheehan was named by John Paul II as the eleventh archbishop of Santa Fe on August 17, 1993. He was installed as archbishop on September 21, 1993.

Sheehan became apostolic administrator of the Diocese of Phoenix on June 18, 2003, after Bishop Thomas J. O'Brien resigned. Sheehan resigned as apostolic administrator upon the installation of Bishop Thomas J. Olmsted on December 20, 2003. In addition to his native English, Sheehan spoke Italian and Spanish.

On April 27, 2015, Pope Francis accepted Sheehan's resignation as archbishop of Santa Fe.

== Views ==
=== Pro-choice politicians at Catholic universities ===
In August 2009, Sheehan decried the attacks by some of his fellow bishops on the University of Notre Dame for having US President Barack Obama deliver its commencement speech and receive an honorary degree. Sheehan also said the Catholic community risks isolating itself from the rest of the country and that refusing to talk to a politician or refusing communion because of a difference on a single issue was counterproductive.

=== Cohabitation and marriage ===
Sheehan was an outspoken opponent of cohabitation and its effects on marriage. He released letters to his archdiocese in regards to cohabitation and its effects on children.

== Death ==
Sheehan died in Albuquerque on June 3, 2023, at the age of 83.

== See also ==
- Catholic Church hierarchy
- Catholic Church in the United States
- Historical list of the Catholic bishops of the United States
- List of Catholic bishops of the United States
- Lists of patriarchs, archbishops, and bishops

Catholic Church titles
Preceded by Robert Fortune Sanchez	Archbishop of Santa Fe; 1993–2015	Succeeded by John Charles Wester
Preceded by First Bishop	Bishop of Lubbock; 1983–1993	Succeeded by Plácido Rodriguez
