= Augustine Danglmayr =

American Catholic bishop

His Excellency, The Most Reverend Augustine Danglmayr
- Auxiliary Bishop of Dallas
- Church: Catholic Church
- See: Titular See of Olba
- Appointed: April 24, 1942
- In office: October 7, 1942 - August 22, 1969

Orders
- Ordination: June 10, 1922 by Joseph Patrick Lynch
- Consecration: October 7, 1942 by Amleto Giovanni Cicognani

Personal details
- Born: December 11, 1898 Muenster, Texas, US
- Died: September 18, 1992 (aged 93) Muenster
- Education: Saint Mary Seminary; Kenrick Seminary
- Motto: Cor ad cor loquitur (Heart speaks to heart)

Augustine Danglmayr (December 11, 1898 – September 18, 1992) was a bishop of the Catholic Church in the United States. He served as an auxiliary bishop of the Diocese of Dallas in Texas from 1942 to 1969.

== Biography ==
=== Early life ===
Born in Muenster, Texas, Danglmayr was educated at Subiaco Academy in Arkansas, Saint Mary Seminary in La Porte, Texas, and Kenrick Seminary near St. Louis, Missouri.

=== Priesthood ===
Danglmayr was ordained a priest for the Diocese of Dallas at Sacred Heart Cathedral in Dallas on June 10, 1922 by Bishop Joseph Patrick Lynch. Danglmayr later served as vicar general of the diocese.

=== Auxiliary Bishop of Dallas ===
On April 24, 1942 Pope Pius XII appointed Danglmayr as titular bishop of Olba and auxiliary bishop of Dallas. He was consecrated by Archbishop Amleto Giovanni Cicognani on October 7, 1942 at Sacred Heart Cathedral. The principal co-consecrators were Lynch and Auxiliary Bishop William David O'Brien. Danglmayer was named pastor of St. Monica Parish in Dallas in 1954.

Danglmayr served as an auxiliary bishop in Dallas until his resignation was accepted by Pope Paul VI on August 22, 1969. Danglmayr died on September 18, 1992, in Muenster at age 93.
