= Diocese of Lubbock =

Latin Catholic ecclesiastical jurisdiction in Texas, USA

Coordinates: 33°35′36″N 101°54′46″W

Diocese of Lubbock Dioecesis Lubbokensis
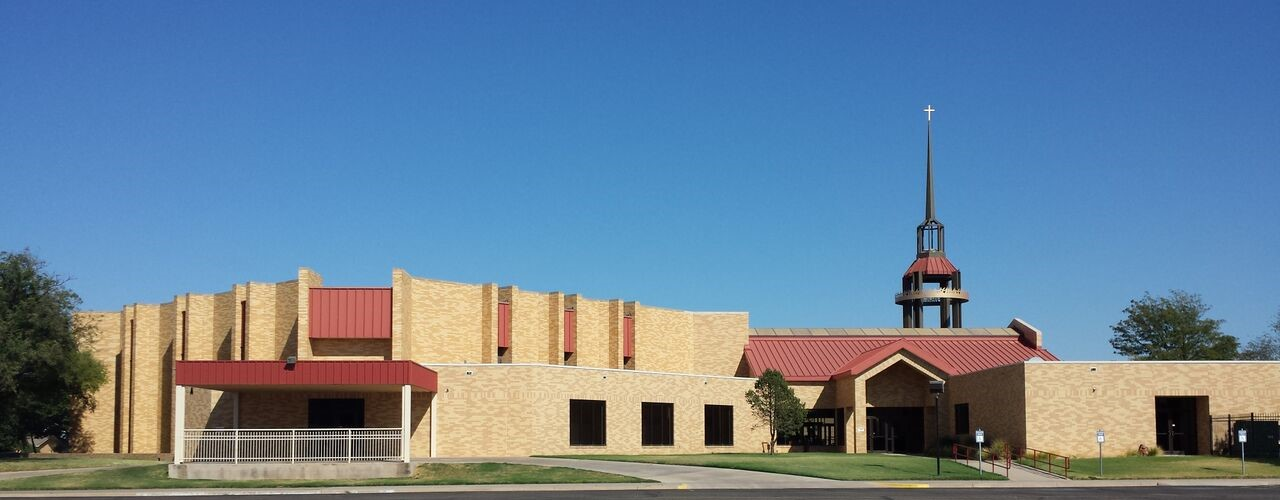
- Christ the King Cathedral

- Coat of arms

Location
- Country: United States
- Territory: 25 counties south of the Texas panhandle
- Ecclesiastical province: Province of San Antonio

Statistics
- Population: 136,894 (2010)
- Parishes: 61
- Schools: 1

Information
- Denomination: Catholic
- Sui iuris church: Latin Church
- Rite: Roman Rite
- Established: June 17, 1983
- Cathedral: Cathedral of Christ the King

Current leadership
- Pope: Leo XIV
- Bishop: Robert Milner Coerver
- Metropolitan Archbishop: Gustavo Garcia-Siller
- Vicar General: David Cruz
- Bishops emeritus: Plácido Rodriguez

Map
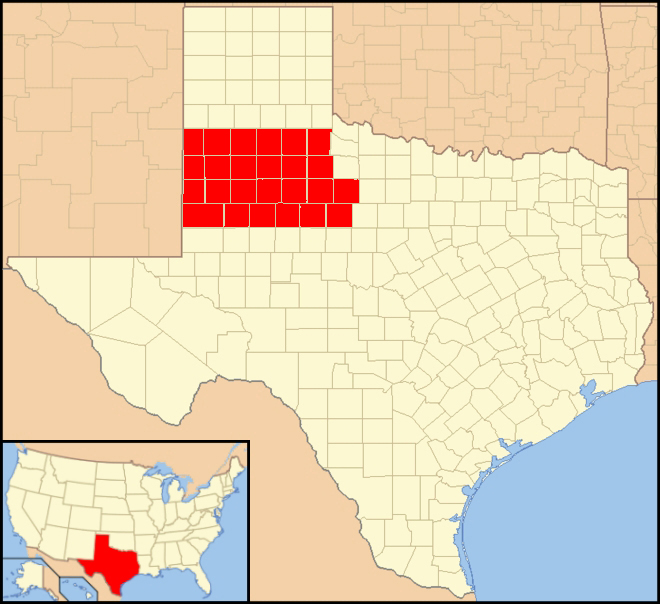

Website
- catholiclubbock.org

The Diocese of Lubbock (Latin: Dioecesis Lubbokensis) is a Roman Catholic diocese in West Texas in the United States. Erected in 1983, it is a suffragan diocese of the metropolitan Archdiocese of San Antonio. The mother church is Christ the King Cathedral in Lubbock. The bishop is Robert Coerver.

== Description ==
The Diocese of Lubbock encompasses 25 counties in Texas:

Bailey, Borden, Cochran, Cottle, Crosby, Dawson, Dickins, Fisher, Floyd, Gaines, Garza, Hale, Haskell, Hockley, Jones, Kent, King, Lamb, Lubbock, Lynn, Motley, Scurry, Stonewall, Terry, and Yoakum.

As of 2023, the diocese contained a Catholic population over 136,000 served in 61 parishes.

== History ==
=== Name changes ===
The Lubbock area was divided among several different Catholic jurisdictions over the years:

- Prefecture Apostolic of Texas (1841 to 1847)
- Vicariate Apostolic of Texas (1847 to 1874)
- Diocese of Galveston (1874 to 1914)
- Dioceses of Dallas and San Antonio (1914 to 1926)
- Diocese of Amarillo (1926 to 1983)
- Diocese of San Angelo (1961 to 1983)
- Diocese of Lubbock (1983 to present)

=== 1900 to present ===
The first parish in Lubbock, St. Joseph's, was established in 1924. The Diocese of Amarillo built St. Elizabeth's Church in Lubbock in 1936, the second Catholic church in the city. The Sisters of Orange, California, opened St. Mary of the Plains Hospital in Lubbock in 1939. It is now known as Covenant Medical Center–Lakeside

Pope John Paul II erected the Diocese of Lubbock on June 25, 1983, taking its territory from the Dioceses of Amarillo and San Angelo. The pope named Michael Sheehan of the Diocese of Dallas-Fort Worth as the first bishop of the new diocese. In 1993, Sheehan was named archbishop of the Archdiocese of Santa Fe.

Auxiliary Bishop Plácido Rodriguez of the Archdiocese of Chicago was appointed as the second bishop of Lubbock by John Paul II in 1994. Rodriguez retired in 2015. As of 2023, the current bishop of Lubbock is Robert Coerver from the Diocese of Dallas. He was appointed by Pope Francis in 2016.

In March 2021, the Federal Bureau of Investigation issued an arrest warrant for Nathan Webb, who was accused of embezzling $250,000 from Christ the King Cathedral. Webb had been in charge of bill payment and management of donations for the cathedral parish. Webb fled to Colombia after the warrant was issued. After being extradited back to Texas, Webb pleaded guilty to wire fraud and was sentenced in April 2023 to four years in state prison.

=== Sex abuse ===
In January 2004, Bishop Rodriguez released a list of five priests and one deacon with credible allegations of sexual abuse of minors. Most of the cases predated the formation of the diocese. The men on the list were either deceased or already removed from ministry.

In January, 2019, Bishop Coerver released a revised list of clerics with credible accusations against them. One priest named on the revised list was Jesus Guerrero, who then sued the diocese in March 2019 for defamation. The Texas Supreme Court dismissed Guerrero's lawsuit in June 2021, citing the First Amendment rights under the US Constitution for churches to manage their own affairs.

== Bishops ==
1. Michael Jarboe Sheehan (1983–1993), appointed Archbishop of Santa Fe
2. Plácido Rodriguez, C.M.F. (1994–2016)
3. Robert Milner Coerver (since 2016)

== Education ==
The Diocese of Lubbock has one school, Christ the King Cathedral School in Lubbock. It is Pre-K through high school.

== Media ==
South Plains Catholic (magazine 2022-present)

== Arms ==
Coat of arms of Diocese of Lubbock
Notes Arms was designed and adopted when the diocese was erected Adopted 1983 Escutcheon The upper part of the arms has a red background with a gold crown on a silver cross. The lower part of the arms has a black background with a silver sprig of cotton. Symbolism The red background represents the Caprock Escarpment in the diocese. The cross and crown represent Jesus Christ. The black background represents the petroleum reserves in the diocese. The cotton sprig represents the primary agricultural crop of the diocese.
