= Charles Victor Grahmann =

American Catholic prelate (1931–2018)

His Excellency, The Most Reverend Charles Victor Grahmann
- Bishop of Dallas
- Church: Catholic
- Diocese: Dallas
- Appointed: December 9, 1989 (Coadjutor)
- Installed: July 14, 1990
- Term ended: March 6, 2007
- Predecessor: Thomas A. Tschoepe
- Successor: Kevin Farrell
- Previous posts: Auxiliary Bishop of San Antonio; Bishop of Victoria in Texas

Orders
- Ordination: March 17, 1956 by Robert Emmet Lucey
- Consecration: August 20, 1981 by Patrick Flores, Sidney Matthew Metzger, and John Louis Morkovsky

Personal details
- Born: July 15, 1931 Hallettsville, Texas, U.S.
- Died: 14 August 2018 (aged 87) San Antonio, Texas, U.S.
- Education: Assumption Seminary; Our Lady of the Lake University
- Motto: To walk humbly with your God

Styles of Charles Victor Grahmann
- Reference style: His Excellency; The Most Reverend
- Spoken style: Your Excellency
- Religious style: Bishop

Charles Victor Grahmann (July 15, 1931 – August 14, 2018) was an American prelate of the Catholic Church who served as bishop of the Diocese of Dallas in Texas from 1990 to 2007. He also served as bishop of the Diocese of Victoria in Texas from 1982 to 1989 and as auxiliary bishop of the Archdiocese of San Antonio in Texas from 1981 to 1982.

== Biography ==
=== Early life ===
Charles Grahmann was born in Hallettsville, Texas, on July 15, 1931. He was the fourth of 11 children born to Annie Grafe Grahmann and Nicholas Anthony Grahmann. The family worked a small farm with horse or mule-driven implements. Grahmann attended Sacred Heart School in Hallettsville from 1938 to 1945. During the seventh grade, he decided to join the priesthood. In 1945, he left school in Hallettsville to attend St. John's Seminary in San Antonio. Grahmann took philosophy and theology classes at Assumption Seminary in San Antonio.

=== Priesthood ===
On March 17, 1956, Grahmann was ordained into the priesthood by Archbishop Robert Lucey for the Archdiocese of San Antonio at the Cathedral of San Fernando in San Antonio. After his ordination, Grahmann's first pastoral assignment was at St. James Parish in San Antonio, moving later that year to St. Joseph's Parish in Yoakum, Texas. He stayed in Yoakum until 1961. During these assignments, he taught English and Spanish in the high schools, and coached basketball and football.

In 1961, Grahmann was moved to St. Paul's Parish in San Antonio and in 1964 became priest-secretary to Archbishop Lucey. He attended business college to improve his ability to monitor the business office and computerize the operation. Grahmann also attended Our Lady of the Lake University, obtaining a Master of Education and Counseling degree. Grahmann was appointed diocesan director of Catholic Relief Services (CRS). In 1970, he started working as priest-secretary to the new archbishop, Francis Furey, a position he would hold until 1980. Grahmann helped found COPS (Communities Organized for Public Service), an organization to assist Hispanics in San Antonio.

During his years as priest and bishop, Grahmann participated in numerous aid activities for other nations. These included building a pastoral center for the Diocese of Linares in Chile, constructing a new church for the Diocese of Recife in Brazil, an elementary school in Syria and a hospital in Lebanon.

=== Auxiliary Bishop of San Antonio ===
Grahmann was named auxiliary bishop of San Antonio on June 30, 1981, by Pope John Paul II, with the titular see of Equilium. Grahmann was consecrated on August 20, 1981, by Archbishop Patrick Flores Grahmann chose as his episcopal motto "Walk Humbly with Your God” (Micah 6:8)

=== Bishop of Victoria in Texas ===
John Paul II appointed Grahmann as the first bishop of the new Diocese of Victoria in Texas on April 13, 1982. He was installed on May 29, 1982. As bishop, he created a consultation process that included clergy, members of religious orders, and lay people to assist in diocese planning.

=== Bishop of Dallas ===
On December 9, 1989, Grahmann was appointed coadjutor bishop of Dallas to assist Bishop Thomas Tschoepe. He automatically became the sixth bishop of the diocese on July 14, 1990, when Tschoepe retired. As bishop, Grahmann created new parishes for Hispanic, Vietnamese and other Catholics moving into the diocese. He also opened the John Paul II High School in Plano, Texas.

On July 10, 1998, the diocese settled a sexual abuse case involving eight men who had been victimized as altar boys by Reverend Rudolph Kos, a diocese priest. In a summation for the original trial, the judge said that the diocese was guilty of gross negligence, malice, conspiracy and fraud in its handling of Kos. The diocese had appealed the original jury award of $120 million, but the victims and their families decided to settle for $23.4 million because they knew the diocese could not afford more. Kos was convicted of sexual assault and sentenced to life in prison in 1998. Grahmann issued an apology to the Kos victims when this settlement was announced, saying,

"To the victims and their families, I once again want to apologize on behalf of the diocese. Based on what we know now, the decisions made concerning Rudy Kos were errors in human judgment. I regret very much what happened, and I am deeply sorry for your pain".

=== Retirement and legacy ===
On July 15, 2006, his 75th birthday, Grahmann offered Pope Benedict XVI his letter of resignation as bishop of Dallas, as required under canon law. The pope accepted his resignation on March 6, 2007.

Grahmann spent several years in Dallas, then moved to a retirement facility in San Antonio in 2012 when his health began to falter. Several hours after saying mass on the morning of August 14, 2018, Grahmann was transported to St. Luke Baptist Hospital in San Antonio, where he died during surgery.

== See also ==
- Catholic Church hierarchy
- Catholic Church in the United States
- Historical list of the Catholic bishops of the United States
- List of Catholic bishops of the United States
- Lists of patriarchs, archbishops, and bishops

== Episcopal succession ==
Catholic Church titles
Preceded by Thomas Ambrose Tschoepe	Bishop of Dallas; 1990–2007	Succeeded by Kevin Farrell
Preceded by First Bishop	Bishop of Victoria; 1982–1989	Succeeded by David Eugene Fellhauer
Preceded by -	Auxiliary Bishop of San Antonio; 1981–1982	Succeeded by -
