= Christopher Edward Byrne =

Catholic bishop (1867–1950)

His Excellency, The Most Reverend Christopher Edward Byrne
- Bishop of Galveston
- Church: Roman Catholic Church
- See: Diocese of Galveston
- Appointed: July 18, 1918
- Installed: November 10, 1918
- Term ended: April 1, 1950
- Predecessor: Nicolaus Aloysius Gallagher
- Successor: Wendelin Joseph Nold

Orders
- Ordination: September 23, 1891 by Peter Richard Kenrick
- Consecration: November 10, 1919 by John J. Glennon

Personal details
- Born: April 21, 1867 Byrnesville, Missouri, US
- Died: April 1, 1950 (aged 82) Galveston, Texas, US
- Education: St. Mary's College; St. Mary's Seminary

Christopher Edward Byrne (April 21, 1867 – April 1, 1950) was an American prelate of the Roman Catholic Church. He served as bishop of the Diocese of Galveston in Texas from 1918 until his death.

== Biography ==
=== Early life ===
Byrne was born on April 21, 1867, in Byrnesville, Missouri, to Patrick and Rose Byrne. After attending the village school where his father taught, he earned a Bachelor of Arts at St. Mary's Academy and College in 1886. He then studied for the priesthood at St. Mary's Seminary and University.

=== Priesthood ===
Byrne was ordained a priest for the Archdiocese of St. Louis by Archbishop Peter Richard Kenrick in St. Louis, on September 23, 1891. After his ordination, Byrne served as a curate at St. Bridget's Parish in St. Louis. In 1897, he was appointed pastor of Sacred Heart Parish in Columbia, Missouri. Byrne took a medical leave of absence in 1898, moving to San Antonio, Texas, to recuperate. Years later, Byrne said that a doctor had told him when he reached age 30, his heart disease would kill him in a few months.

In 1899, Byrne returned to Missouri to become pastor of St. Joseph's Parish in Edina then went to Holy Name Parish at St. Louis in 1911. He erected churches and schools at every assignment, and for many years he also did editorial work on the Catholic newspaper The Church Progress. He also served as diocesan director of the Holy Name Society and member of the diocesan school board.

=== Bishop of Galveston ===
On July 18, 1918, Byrne was appointed the fourth bishop of Galveston by Pope Benedict XV. He received his episcopal consecration on November 10, 1918, from Archbishop John J. Glennon, with Bishops Thomas Francis Lillis and John Morris serving as co-consecrators. Byrne's expressed priority as bishop was vocations, saying,

"If Catholicism has not taken that deep hold on the people which will make them dedicate their young to God's service, it cannot endure."

Byrne ordained about 130 priests and received several hundred people into religious communities. The diocese increased from 70,000 to 200,000 parishioners during Byrne's tenure, and the number of schools from 51 to over 100. In 1936, Byrne helped organize the centennial celebration of Texan independence from Mexico, holding an open-air mass at the San Jacinto Battlefield near Houston.

=== Death ===
Byrne died on April 1, 1950, aged 82, in Galveston, from a myocardial infraction. He is buried at Calvary Cemetery, in Galveston.

Catholic Church titles
Preceded by Nicolaus Aloysius Gallagher	Bishop of Galveston; 1918–1950	Succeeded by Wendelin Joseph Nold
