= Brendan J. Cahill =

American Catholic prelate (born 1963)

His Excellency, The Most Reverend Brendan J. Cahill
- Bishop of Joliet
- Church: Catholic
- Province: Chicago
- Diocese: Joliet
- Appointed: September 17, 2026
- Installed: November 11, 2026
- Predecessor: Ronald Hicks
- Previous post: Bishop of Victoria in Texas (2015‍–‍2026)

Orders
- Ordination: May 19, 1990 by Joseph Anthony Fiorenza
- Consecration: June 29, 2015 by Daniel DiNardo, Joseph Fiorenza, David Eugene Fellhauer

Personal details
- Born: November 28, 1963 (age 62) Coral Gables, Florida, US
- Education: Rice University; St. Mary's Seminary / University of St. Thomas; Xavier University of Louisiana; Pontifical Gregorian University
- Motto: Cor mundum crea in me, Deus (Latin for 'O God, create in me a clean heart')
- Styles
- Reference style: His Excellency; The Most Reverend
- Spoken style: Your Excellency
- Religious style: Bishop

Brendan John Cahill (born November 28, 1963) is an American Catholic prelate serving as Bishop of Joliet since 2026. He previously served as Bishop of Victoria in Texas from 2015 to 2026.

== Early life ==
Cahill was born on November 28, 1963, in Coral Gables, Florida to Joe and Joan Cahill. After his family moved to Houston in 1971, Cahill attended St. Cecilia Catholic School in Houston and graduated in 1981 from St. Thomas High School in the same city. He then spent a year at Rice University in Houston, but left after deciding to become a priest.

Cahill enrolled in 1982 in St. Mary's Seminary and the University of St. Thomas, both in Houston. Cahill earned a Bachelor of Psychology degree from St. Thomas in 1985 and a Master of Divinity degree in 1990.

== Priesthood ==
Cahill was ordained a priest by Archbishop Joseph Fiorenza for the Diocese of Galveston-Houston on May 19, 1990, at St. Michael's Church in Houston. After his ordination, the diocese assigned Cahill served as an associate pastor at St. Frances Cabrini Parish in Houston. In 1992, he was transferred to Christ the Good Shepherd Parish in Spring, Texas.

Cahill left Good Shepherd in 1994 to attend Xavier University of Louisiana in New Orleans. He received a Master of Theology degree from Xavier that specialized in the experience and theology of African-American Catholics that same year. Cahill then went to Rome to attend the Pontifical North American College. He was awarded a Licentiate in Dogmatic Theology in 1996 and a Doctor of Fundamental Theology degree in 1999 from the Pontifical Gregorian University.

In 1999, Cahill returned to Texas, where he joined the faculty of St. Mary's Seminary. Cahill was appointed rector of St. Mary in 2001. That same year, Fiorenza named Cahill as director of the Secretariat for Clergy Formation and Chaplaincy Services.

== Episcopal career ==
=== Bishop of Victoria in Texas ===
Coat of Arms as Bishop of Victoria

Pope Francis named Cahill as bishop of Victoria on April 23, 2015. He was installed and consecrated on June 29, 2015, by Cardinal Daniel DiNardo. Fiorenza and Bishop David Fellhauer were the co-consecrators. The liturgy was celebrated in Our Lady of Victory Cathedral in Victoria.

On January 21, 2019, Cahill publicly named three priests from the diocese with credible accusations of sexual abuse of minors. The investigation, which was done by an independent attorney, covered all allegations dating back to the founding of the diocese in 1982. One priest, David L. Collela, was retired, and a second priest, Guido Miguel Quiroz Reyes, was deceased. The third priest, Alfred Prado, had been laicized and had left the country.

Cahill speaks English, Spanish and Italian, and has a working knowledge of French and German. Cahill has also served as an associate chaplain of the Knights of Malta, of the Equestrian Order of the Holy Sepulchre of Jerusalem, and he is a fourth-degree member of the Knights of Columbus.

=== Bishop of Joliet ===
On September 17, 2026, Pope Leo XIV named Cahill the seventh bishop of Joliet, succeeding Ronald Hicks, who was installed Archbishop of New York. Cahill was installed on November 11.

== See also ==
- Catholic Church in the United States
- Hierarchy of the Catholic Church
- Historical list of the Catholic bishops of the United States
- List of Catholic bishops in the United States
- Lists of popes, patriarchs, primates, archbishops, and bishops

== Episcopal succession ==
Catholic Church titles
Preceded by Ronald A. Hicks	Bishop of Joliet; 2026–present	Succeeded by Incumbent
Preceded by David Eugene Fellhauer	Bishop of Victoria; 2015–2026	Succeeded by Sede Vacante
