= Alina Garciamendez =

US-born Mexican international footballer (born 1991)

Personal information
- Full name: Alina Lisi Garciamendez Rowold
- Birth name: Alina Lisi Garciamendez
- Date of birth: 16 April 1991 (age 35)
- Place of birth: Los Gatos, California, United States
- Height: 1.77 m (5 ft 10 in)
- Position: Defender

Youth career
- Dallas Texans
- 2006–2008: Ursuline Academy of Dallas

College career
Years	Team	Apps	(Gls)
2009–2012	Stanford Cardinal		

Senior career*
Years	Team	Apps	(Gls)
2013–2014	Frankfurt	3	(0)
2016–2017	FC Dallas		

International career^{‡}
- Mexico U17
2008–2010	Mexico U20	9	(2)
2009–2016	Mexico	51	(2)
- * Club domestic league appearances and goals as of 23:30, 25 June 2015 (UTC) ‡ National team caps and goals as of 12 October 2017

Alina Lisi Garciamendez Rowold (born 16 April 1991) is an American-born Mexican former footballer who played as a defender. She has been a member of the Mexico women's national team.

== Early life ==
Born in Los Gatos, California, to Edsel Garciamendez-Budar and Lisi Rowold-Garciamendez, Alina's family moved to Texas, where she attended Ursuline Academy in Dallas. Garciamendez helped lead Ursuline to four consecutive Texas Association of Private and Parochial Schools Division I championships, extending the school's streak to 19 consecutive titles. A three-time TAPPS District 1-5A Player of the Year, Garciamendez was rated as the 34th-best college prospect in the class of 2009 by ESPN Rise.

During her senior year, she scored eight goals and had 12 assists as a senior midfielder, completing her fourth season as a starter and second as a captain. She also participated in track and field. Garciamendez won a national club championship with Dallas Texans Red 91 in 2008 and reached the finals in 2007. She also won three Region III championships and four North Texas State Cup titles.

She is of Mexican descent.

=== Stanford University ===
Garciamendez has started every match since she arrived at Stanford in 2009, setting a school-record of 100 matches.

During her freshman year, she was a vital part of a defensive line that allowed only 0.58 goals per match and totaled 14 shutouts. She was named to the Soccer America All-Freshman and Top Drawer Soccer All-Rookie first teams and selected to the All-Pac-10 second team and Pac-10 All-Freshman team. She was also named among CollegeSoccer360.com's Primetime Performers of the Week on Oct. 20 following Stanford's shutouts of USC and UCLA.

As a sophomore, she became team co-captain and scored her first collegiate goal against Santa Clara in the second round of the NCAA tournament on a header at the far post in the 49th minute. The goal gave Stanford a 2–0 lead and proved to be the winner in a 2–1 victor. Mirroring her freshman year, she was the foundation of a defense that allowed 0.45 goals per match and had 15 shutouts.

During her junior year, Garciamendez contributed to 18 shutouts and a team goals-against average of 0.34 from her central defender position. She scored on a header for Stanford's final goal in 3-0 NCAA semifinal victory over Florida State. She was named to the Soccer America MVPs second team, NSCAA All-Pacific Region first team, All-Pac-12 first team, and NCAA College Cup All-Tournament Team. Soccer America honored her as a Preseason All-American.

In 2012, she was a semifinalist for the MAC Hermann Trophy award.

== Playing career ==
=== Club ===
In 2013, Garciamendez was allocated to the Washington Spirit for the inaugural season of the National Women's Soccer League as part of the NWSL Player Allocation. However, she later opted to join German side, FFC Frankfurt, signing a contract through 2015. In October 2013, it was announced that her NWSL rights had been traded to the Seattle Reign FC.

=== International ===
Garciamendez joined the Mexico national team system in February 2008. She scored two goals at the U-17 CONCACAF World Cup Qualifying Tournament in Trinidad and Tobago in July, 2008 and played two matches as forward at the 2008 FIFA under-20 Women's World Cup in Chile. She was captain of the Mexico team at the FIFA Under-20 World Cup in Germany and scored on a short-range volley against Nigeria, in the 78th minute, to tie the match 1-1, allowing Mexico to win its group and advance to the knockout stages. She also captained the Mexico team that finished second in the eight-team U-20 CONCACAF Championship in Guatemala City, Guatemala.

Garciamendez was a starter for the Mexico women's national football team at the 2011 FIFA Women's World Cup. She also started during the CONCACAF Olympic Qualifying Tournament semifinals on January 24, 2012, but the team fell one victory short of a berth in the 2012 Summer Olympics in London.

== See also ==
- List of Mexico women's international footballers
