= Rudolph Kos =

Catholic priest and convicted pedophile in Dallas, Texas, United States

Rudolph Edward Kos
- Born: April 29, 1945 (age 81)
- Conviction: Aggravated sexual assault (3 counts)
- Penalty: Life imprisonment

Rudolph Edward Kos (born April 29, 1945) is a former Roman Catholic priest who was found guilty of sex crimes in the Diocese of Dallas in the U.S. state of Texas. In 1998, Kos was convicted of three counts of aggravated sexual assault and sentenced to life in prison. Kos was denied parole in 2012 and will not be eligible for another hearing until 2028.

In April 1992, a therapist had told officials of the diocese that Kos was a "classic textbook pedophile". However, Bishop Charles Victor Grahmann acknowledged he did not read this record, and allowed Kos to have access to children for almost one full year more. The last documented incident of abuse was 11 months later.

In 1997, a jury awarded $120 million to victims in a sex abuse case against the Catholic Diocese of Dallas, Texas in a lawsuit implicating Kos. On July 10, 1998, the Roman Catholic Diocese of Dallas settled their appeal of that verdict and agreed to pay $23.4 million to eight former altar boys and the relatives of a ninth who had claimed they were sexually abused by Kos. Bishop Grahmann issued a written apology when this settlement was announced, saying, "To the victims and their families, I once again want to apologize on behalf of the diocese. Based on what we know now, the decisions made concerning Rudy Kos were errors in human judgment. I regret very much what happened, and I am deeply sorry for your pain."
