= Diocese of Equilio =

The Diocese of Equilio (Latin: Dioecesis Equilium) was a Roman Catholic ecclesiastical territory in the town of Equilio the province of Venice, Italy. It was suppressed in 1466 to the Patriarchate of Venice.

== History ==
- 800: Erected as Diocese of Equilio
- 1466: Suppressed to the Patriarchate of Venice
- 1966: Restored as the Titular Episcopal See of Equilio

== Ordinaries ==
=== Bishops ===
- Antonio Bono (Bon) (6 Feb 1443 - 1451 Died)
- Andreas Bono (15 Nov 1451 - 1466 Died)

=== Titular Bishops ===
- Raffaele Radossi † (23 June 1967 - 27 September 1972 dead)
- Milton Corrêa Pereira † (25 April 1973 - 5 March 1980, appointed Archbishop of Manaus)
- Charles Victor Grahmann † (30 giugno 1981 - 13 aprile 1982, appointed Bishop of Victoria in Texas)
- Piotr Hemperek † (7 May 1982 - 4 July 1992 dead)
- Joseph Anthony Galante † (13 ottobre 1992 - 5 aprile 1994, appointed Bishop of Beaumont)
- Luigi Ventura, since 25 March 1995

== See also ==
- Catholic Church in Italy
