= Candace Johnson =

American-born Panamanian footballer (born 1993)

Personal information
- Full name: Candace Noemi Johnson
- Date of birth: 28 December 1993 (age 32)
- Place of birth: Dallas, Texas, United States
- Height: 1.78 m (5 ft 10 in)
- Position: Defender

Youth career
- Ursuline Academy
- Jaime Cantrell

College career
Years	Team	Apps	(Gls)
2012–2015	Missouri Tigers	78	(6)

Senior career*
Years	Team	Apps	(Gls)
2016	Chicago Red Stars Reserves		

International career^{‡}
2014	Panama		
- * Club domestic league appearances and goals as of February 20, 2016 ‡ National team caps and goals as of February 20, 2016

Candace Noemi Johnson (born 28 December 1993) is an American-born Panamanian footballer who plays for the Panama women's national football team as a defender.

She competed with Panama women's national football team for qualification to 2015 FIFA Women's World Cup.

== Youth career ==
Candace Johnson played for University of Missouri in Southeastern Conference, during her college years. In 2015, Johnson was named to First Team All-SEC. During her junior year, she was named to Second Team All-SEC. In 2013 during her sophomore year, she was named to 2013 Fall SEC Academic Honor Roll. In her freshman year, she was named to SEC All-Freshman Team.

== Chicago Red Stars ==
On January 15, 2016, Johnson was selected by the Chicago Red Stars with the 36th overall pick in the 2016 NWSL College Draft. She did not make the team's final roster and played the 2016 season with the Chicago Red Star Reserves in the Women's Premier Soccer League.

== International ==
On May 22, 2014, Candace Johnson played in the qualification game for the 2015 World Cup for Panama against Belize women's national football team, and scored the first goal at the sixth minute, in a 13–1 drubbing of Belize.

== Personal ==
Candace is the daughter of Dwane and Raquel Johnson and calls Dallas, Texas her hometown. She studied health science at University of Missouri. Candace attended Ursuline Academy of Dallas for high school education and played soccer for Jaime Cantrell.

== See also ==
- List of Panama women's international footballers
