= Plácido Rodriguez =

Mexican-born American prelate

His Excellency, The Most Reverend Plácido Rodríguez C.M.F.
- Bishop Emeritus of Lubbock
- Church: Roman Catholic
- Diocese: Lubbock
- Appointed: April 5, 1994
- Installed: June 1, 1994
- Retired: September 27, 2016
- Predecessor: Michael Jarboe Sheehan
- Successor: Robert Milner Coerver
- Previous post: Auxiliary Bishop of Chicago and Titular Bishop of Fuerteventura (1983-1994)

Orders
- Ordination: May 23, 1968 by Thomas Joseph Grady
- Consecration: December 13, 1983 by Joseph Bernardin, Nevin William Hayes, and Alfred Leo Abramowicz

Personal details
- Born: October 11, 1940 (age 85) Celaya, Mexico
- Education: Claretian College Seminary; Catholic University of America; Loyola University Chicago
- Motto: Caritas Christi urget nos (The love of Christ urges us)

Styles of Plácido Rodríguez
- Reference style: His Excellency; The Most Reverend
- Spoken style: Your Excellency
- Religious style: Bishop

Plácido Rodríguez C.M.F. (born October 11, 1940) is a Mexican-born American prelate of the Catholic Church. He served as bishop of the Diocese of Lubbock in Texas from 1994 to 2015 and as an auxiliary bishop of the Archdiocese of San Antonio in Texas from 1983 to 1994. he is a member of the Missionary Sons of the Immaculate Heart of Mary (Claretians).

== Biography ==
=== Early life ===
Plácido Rodríguez was born on October 11, 1940, in Celaya, Mexico to Eutimio and Maria Conception. He was the 11th born out of 14 children; his family emigrated to Chicago in 1953, when he was twelve years old.

Rodríguez attended Saint Francis Assisi Parish School in Chicago, then St. Jude's Seminary in Momence, Illinois. He then entered the Claretian Novitiate in Los Angeles, making his first profession of vows in 1960.

After finishing at the novitiate, Rodríguez entered Claretian College Seminary in Calabasas, California, graduating in 1964. He then attended the Catholic University of America in Washington, D.C. Rodríguez took his perpetual vows with the Claretians in 1967 and graduated from Catholic University in 1988, receiving a Licentiate in Sacred Theology and a Bachelor of Sacred Theology degree.

=== Priesthood ===
Rodríguez was ordained into the priesthood by Bishop Thomas Grady for the Claretian Order on May 23, 1968.

After his ordination, the Claretians assigned Rodríguez as an associate pastor at Our Lady of Guadalupe Parish in South Chicago. During this period, he earned a Master of Urban Studies degree in 1971 from Loyola University Chicago. In 1975, Rodríguez was appointed vocation director for the Claretian's eastern province, a job he held for six years. In 1981, Rodríguez was named pastor of Our Lady of Fatima Parish in Perth Amboy, New Jersey.

=== Auxiliary Bishop of Chicago ===
Rodríguez was appointed as an auxiliary bishop of Chicago and titular bishop of Fuerteventura by Pope John Paul II on October 18, 1983. He was consecrated by Cardinal Joseph Bernadin at Holy Name Cathedral in Chicago on December 13, 1983.

=== Bishop of Lubbock ===
Rodríguez was appointed as bishop of Lubbock on April 5, 1994, by John Paul II. He was installed on June 1, 1994 in the Lubbock Municipal Coliseum in Lubbock, Texas.

In January 2004, Rodriguez released a list of five priests and one deacon with credible allegations of sexual abuse of minors. Most of the cases dated back before the formation of the diocese. The men on the list were either deceased or already removed from ministry.

=== Retirement ===
After reaching the mandatory retirement age of 75 on October 11, 2015, Rodríguez submitted his letter of resignation as bishop of Lubbock to Pope Francis. The pope accepted it on September 27, 2016. Rodríguez retired to Chicago to return to the Claretian Order, actively working in the promotion of priestly vocations.

== See also ==
- Catholic Church hierarchy
- Catholic Church in the United States
- Historical list of the Catholic bishops of the United States
- List of Catholic bishops of the United States
- Lists of patriarchs, archbishops, and bishops

Catholic Church titles
Preceded by Michael Jarboe Sheehan	Bishop of Lubbock; 1994-2016	Succeeded by Robert Milner Coerver
Preceded by -	Auxiliary Bishop of Chicago; 1983-1994	Succeeded by -
