= Joseph Patrick Lynch =

American prelate

His Excellency, The Most Reverend Joseph Patrick Lynch
- Bishop of Dallas
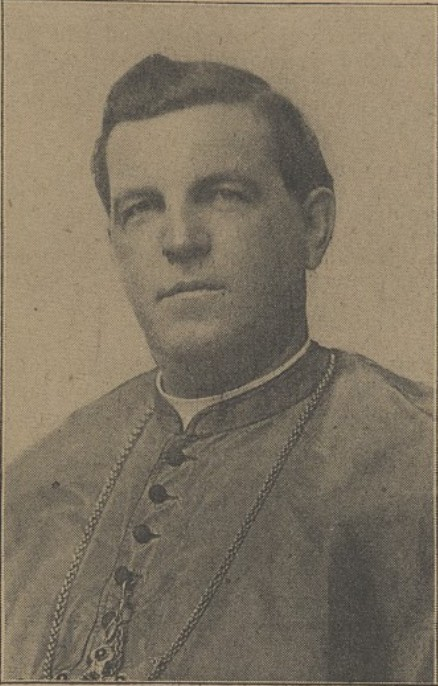
- Church: Roman Catholic Church
- See: Diocese of Dallas
- Predecessor: Edward Joseph Dunne
- Successor: Thomas Kiely Gorman

Orders
- Ordination: June 9, 1900
- Consecration: July 12, 1911 by James Blenk

Personal details
- Born: November 16, 1872 St. Joseph, Michigan, US
- Died: August 19, 1954 (aged 81)
- Education: St. Francis Seminary; St. Charles College; St. Mary's Seminary; Kenrick Seminary
- Motto: In Domino confido (I trust in the Lord)

Styles of Joseph Patrick Lynch
- Reference style: His Excellency; The Most Reverend
- Spoken style: Your Excellency
- Religious style: Bishop

Joseph Patrick Lynch (November 16, 1872 – August 19, 1954) was an American prelate of the Roman Catholic Church. He served as bishop of the Diocese of Dallas in Texas from 1911 until his death in 1954.

== Biography ==
=== Early life ===
Joseph Lynch was born on November 16, 1872, in St. Joseph, Michigan, to John Valentine Lynch and Veronica Jane (née Botham) Lynch. John Lynch immigrated the United States from Newcastle, Moynalty, County Meath, in Ireland, in 1866. Veronica Lynch was born in Montreal, Quebec, and immigrated to the United States in 1856.

In 1887, Joseph Lynch entered St. Francis Seminary in Milwaukee, Wisconsin. After graduating from St. Charles College in Ellicott City, Maryland, in 1891, Lynch studied theology at St. Mary's Seminary in Baltimore, Maryland. Lynch then changed his study to law and then practiced for several years near Chicago, Illinois.

While in Baltimore, Lynch became acquainted with Bishop Edward Dunne, who convinced him to resume his seminary studies. Lynch then attended Kenrick Seminary in St. Louis, Missouri

=== Priesthood ===
Lynch was ordained to the priesthood in Baltimore by Archbishop George Thomas Montgomeryfor the Diocese of Dallas on June 9, 1900. After his ordination, the diocese assigned Lynch as a curate at Sacred Heart Cathedral Parish in Dallas, Texas. In 1902, he was assigned as pastor of St. Stephen's Parish in Weatherford. Texas. He erected churches in Weatherford and in Handley, Texas. The next year, Lynch was named the founding pastor of St. Edward's Parish at Dallas. He there established a church, rectory, and parochial school at St. Edward's In June 1910, Lynch was appointed vicar general of the diocese. Later that year, he became apostolic administrator of the diocese following the death of Bishop Dunne.

=== Bishop of Dallas ===
On June 8, 1911, Lynch was appointed the third bishop of Dallas by Pope Pius X. He received his episcopal consecration on July 12, 1911, from Archbishop James Blenk, with Bishops Nicolaus Gallagher and John Morris serving as co-consecrators, at Sacred Heart Cathedral. At age 38, Lynch was one of the youngest members of the American hierarchy.

During the Mexican Revolution of 1910 to 1920, Lynch became an advocate on behalf of Mexican refugees displaced to Dallas. He also erected a mission church for Mexican Americans in 1915. Known as the "Lion of Texas", Lynch was a widely regarded orator and delivered the main addresses at the bicentennial of San Antonio (1931), the centennial of the 1836 Battle of the Alamo (1936), and the installations of several bishops throughout the country. He was named an assistant at the pontifical throne on May 13, 1936.

During his tenure as bishop, Lynch ordained over 100 priests and established 150 churches, the majority of which were the first Catholic churches in their communities. He built a segregated church for African American Catholics at Fort Worth in 1929. He also founded more than 200 religious and charitable institutions. During his episcopacy the Catholic population in the diocese increased from 20,000 to 125,000, which resulted in the Vatican erecting Dioceses of El Paso (1914), Amarillo (1926), and Austin (1953).

=== Death and legacy ===
Joseph Lynch died on August 19, 1954, at age 81, and is buried at Calvary Hill Cemetery in Dallas.

Catholic Church titles
Preceded by Edward Joseph Dunne	Bishop of Dallas; 1911–1954	Succeeded by Thomas Kiely Gorman
