= Diocese of Victoria in Texas =

Latin Catholic diocese in Texas, U.S.

Coordinates: 28°49′01″N 96°59′36″W

Diocese of Victoria in Texas Dioecesis Victoriensis in Texia

Catholic
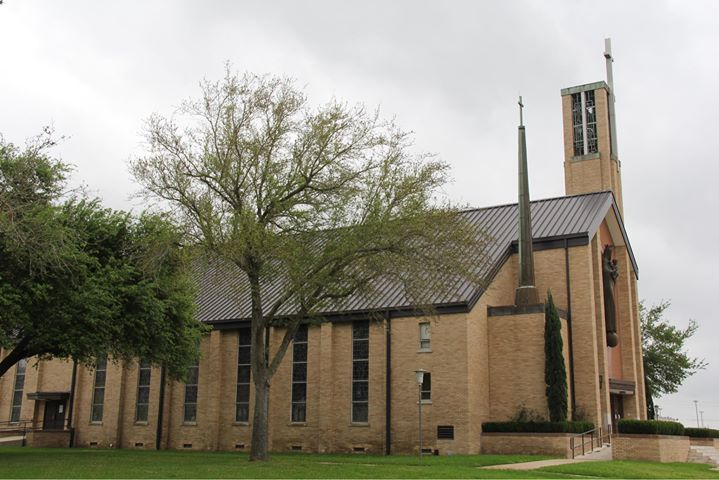
- Cathedral of Our Lady of Victory

- Coat of arms

Location
- Country: United States
- Territory: Fayette, Colorado, Wharton, Matagorda, Lavaca, Jackson, DeWitt, Victoria, Calhoun, Goliad counties in Southeastern Texas
- Episcopal conference: USCCB
- Ecclesiastical region: Region X
- Ecclesiastical province: Ecclesiastical province of Galveston–Houston
- Metropolitan: Archdiocese of Galveston–Houston
- Headquarters: Victoria, Texas, United States

Statistics
- Area: 9,854 sq mi (25,520 km^{2})
- Population: Total; Catholics: (as of 2023); 285,475; 92,600 (32.4%)
- Parishes: 63

Information
- Denomination: Catholic Church
- Sui iuris church: Latin Church
- Rite: Roman Rite
- Established: April 13, 1982 (44 years ago)
- Cathedral: Cathedral of Our Lady of Victory
- Secular priests: 78

Current leadership
- Pope: Leo XIV
- Bishop: Sede vacante
- Metropolitan Archbishop: Joe S. Vásquez

Map
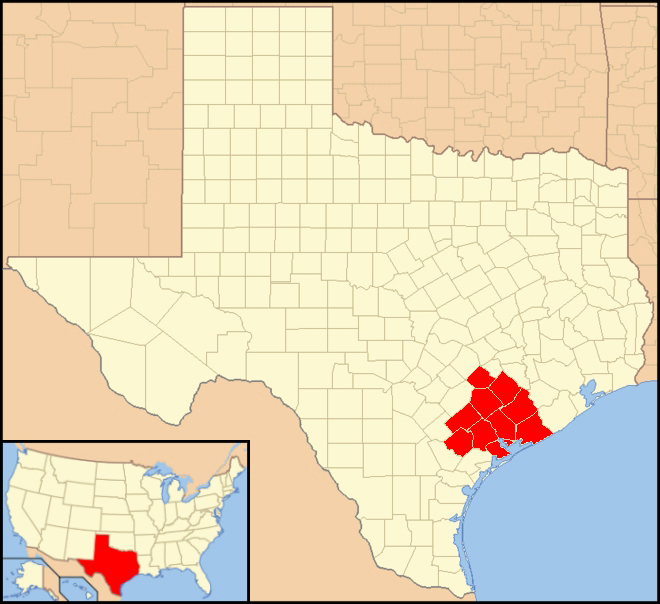

Website
- www.victoriadiocese.org

The Diocese of Victoria in Texas (Latin: Dioecesis Victoriensis in Texia) is a diocese of the Catholic Church in southern Texas in the United States. The Cathedral of Our Lady of Victory serves as the mother church. The diocese is a suffragan to the Archdiocese of Galveston–Houston.

== Territory ==
The Diocese of Victoria in Texas covers the following counties: Calhoun, Colorado, DeWitt, Fayette (but only that portion west of the Colorado River), Goliad, Jackson, Lavaca, Matagorda, Victoria, and Wharton.

== History ==
=== 1600 to 1800 ===
The first Catholic mission in Texas, then part of the Spanish Empire, was San Francisco de los Tejas. It was founded by the Franciscan Damián Massanet in 1690 in the Weches area. The priests left the mission after three years, then established a second one, Nuestro Padre San Francisco de los Tejas, near present-day Alto in 1716.

=== 1800 to 1900 ===
With the end of the Mexican War of Independence in 1821, Texas became part of the new nation of Mexico. In 1824, Don Martin De Leon brought 41 Mexican families to a new settlement on The Guadalupe River, founding the City of Victoria. They quickly built a small log church, named Our Lady of Guadalupe. Today St. Mary's is the second oldest parish in Texas.

After the Mexican Army lost the 1836 Battle of San Jacinto to the Texian Army during the Texas Revolution, most of the Mexican residents of Victoria fled the area and the parish went defunct for four years. That same year, Texas became the independent Texas Republic,

In 1839, Pope Gregory XVI erected the Prefecture Apostolic of Texas, covering the Texas Republic. The prefecture was elevated to a vicariate apostolic in 1841. The Victoria area was assigned to several different Texas dioceses for the next 135 years. The first Catholic church in Port Lavaca, Our Lady of the Gulf Coast, was dedicated in 1865.

Bishop John Anthony Forest of San Antonio in 1897 purchased a parcel of land in El Campo to build a church there. Sts. Peter and Paul Church was dedicated in 1902.

=== 1900 to 2000 ===
Pope John Paul II established the Diocese of Victoria in Texas on April 13, 1982. Its territory was taken from the Archdiocese of San Antonio, the Diocese of Galveston–Houston, and the Diocese of Corpus Christi. The pope named Auxiliary Bishop Charles Grahmann of San Antonio as the first bishop of Victoria.As bishop, he created a consultation process that included clergy, members of religious orders, and lay people to assist in diocese planning.

In 1989, Pope John Paul II named Grahmann as coadjutor bishop of the Diocese of Dallas-Fort Worth. Replacing Grahmann in Victoria in 1990 was David Fellhauer from the same diocese.

=== 2000 to present ===
In 2004, the Vatican transferred the Diocese of Victoria from the province of San Antonio to the newly established Province of Galveston–Houston. Fellhauer retired as bishop of Victoria in 2015. Brendan J. Cahill from Galveston–Houston succeeded him in 2015. In January 2019, Bishop Cahill named three diocesan priests with credible accusations of sexual abuse of minors. The investigation covered all allegations dating back to the founding of the diocese in 1982. One priest was retired and a second was deceased. The third priest had been laicized and left the United States.

== Coat of arms ==
The coat of arms for the Diocese of Victoria in Texas consists of a blue field bearing a silver cross charged with a green lighthouse with a red turret and a gold beacon. According to the diocesan blazon, the blue references sky and water as symbols of peace and unity, while the lighthouse alludes to Christ’s light guiding the faithful and to the diocesan newspaper, The Catholic Lighthouse.

== Leadership ==
Bishops of Victoria in Texas (Roman Rite)

- Charles Victor Grahmann (April 13, 1982 – December 9, 1989), appointed Coadjutor Bishop of Dallas, Texas
- David Eugene Fellhauer (April 7, 1990 – April 23, 2015), retired
  - Administrator Gary W. Janak (April 27, 2015 – June 29, 2015), priest of Victoria in Texas
- Brendan J. Cahill (April 23, 2015 – September 17, 2026), appointed Bishop of Joliet in Illinois

Another priest of this diocese who became bishop

- Gary W. Janak (1988-2021), appointed Auxiliary Bishop of San Antonio, Texas in 2021

== Education ==
As of 2026, the Diocese of Victoria had three high schools and 12 elementary schools with a total enrollment exceeding 3,000 students.

=== High schools ===
- Sacred Heart High School – Hallettsville
- St. Joseph High School – Victoria
- St. Paul High School – Shiner
