= Cathedral of Christ the King (Lubbock, Texas) =

Christ the King Cathedral
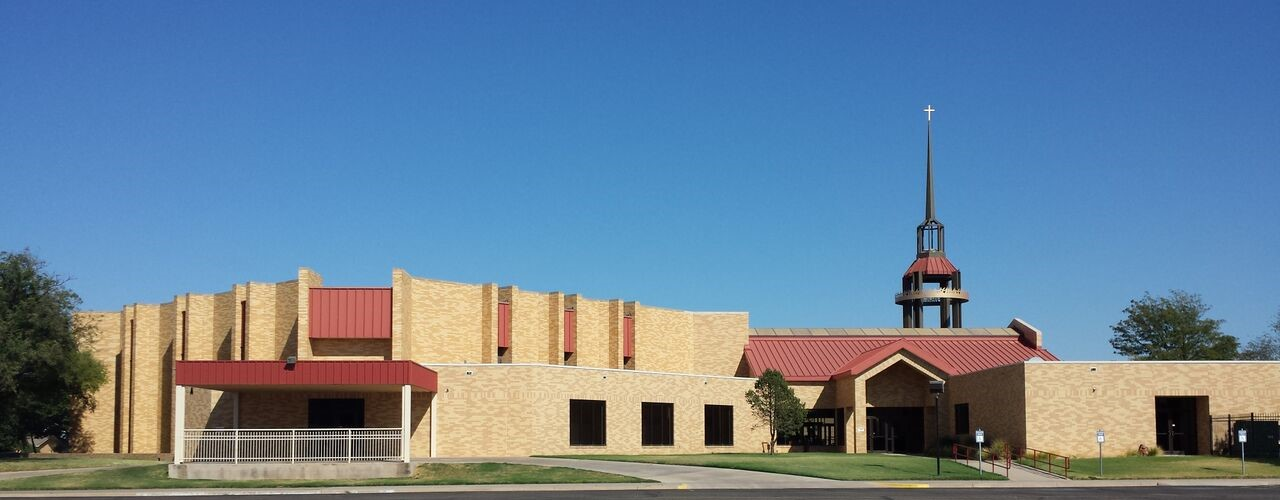

- Location in Texas Christ the King Cathedral (the United States)
- 33°32′41″N 101°54′03″W
- Location: 4011 54th St. Lubbock, Texas
- Country: United States
- Denomination: Roman Catholic Church
- Website: ctkcathedral.org

History
- Founded: January 1, 1961
- Dedicated: 1968

Architecture
- Style: Modern
- Completed: 1968 (58 years ago)

Specifications
- Materials: Brick

Administration
- Diocese: Lubbock

Clergy
- Bishop: Most Rev. Robert Milner Coerver
- Rector: Very Rev. Jose Kochuparambil

Christ the King Cathedral is a cathedral of the Roman Catholic Church in the United States. It is located at 4011 54th Street (at the intersection of Orlando & 54th) in Lubbock, Texas. It was constructed first as a school in 1958 and became a parish entity on January 1, 1961, with the completion of the church itself. When it was built it was surrounded by cotton fields, but is now surrounded by much of the city. On June 17, 1984, Pope John Paul II appointed it the seat of the newly created Diocese of Lubbock with the ordination of Bishop Michael J. Sheehan. As of 2007, its presiding bishop is Bishop Robert Coerver. Its school, which started out as 1st–3rd grade, has grown to serve pre-kindergarten through 12th grade.

== See also ==
- List of Catholic cathedrals in the United States
- List of cathedrals in the United States
