= Roman Catholic Diocese of Dallas =

Latin Catholic jurisdiction in the US

Diocese of Dallas Diœcesis Dallasensis

Catholic
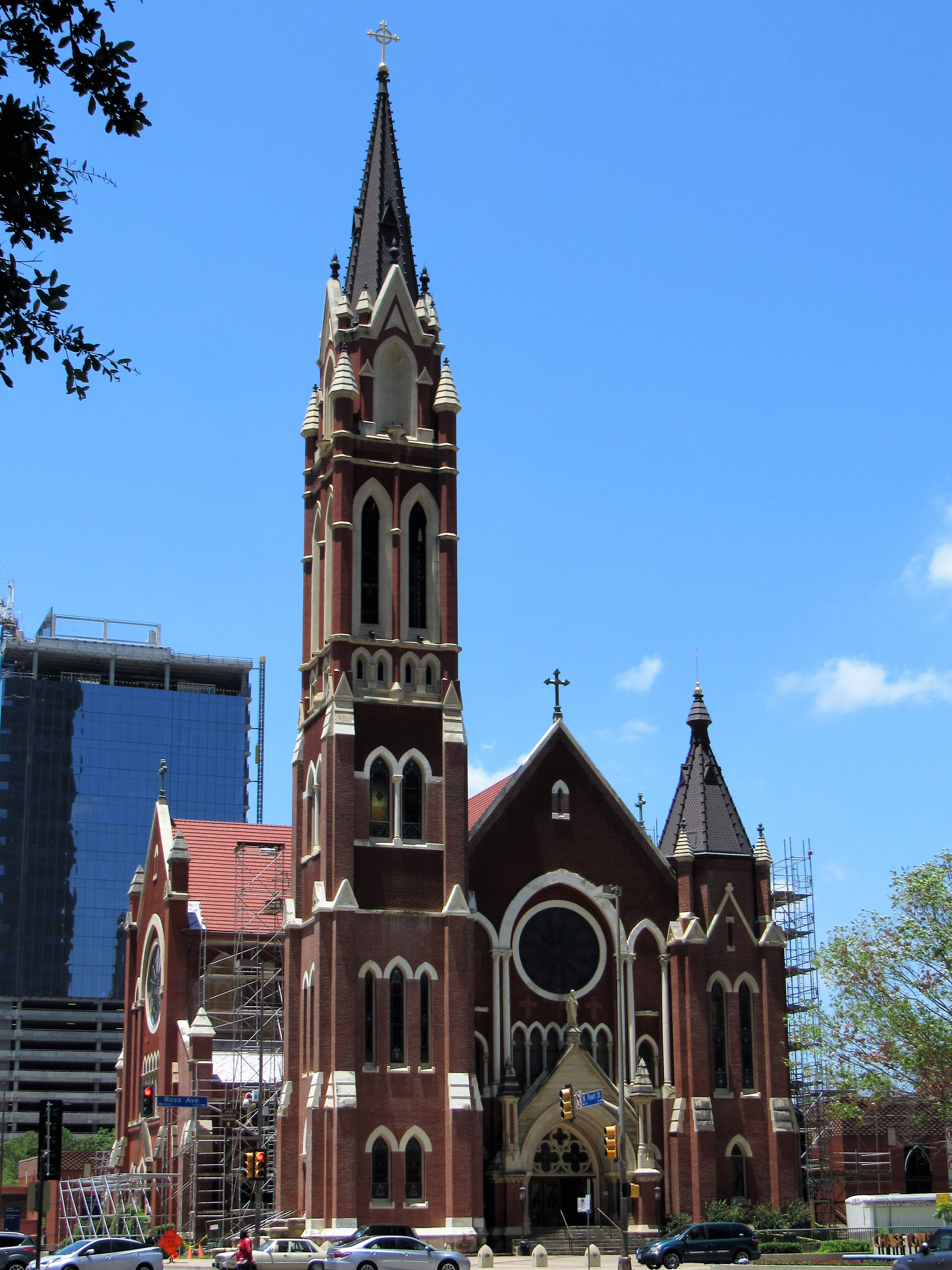
- National Shrine Cathedral of Our Lady of Guadalupe

- Coat of arms

Location
- Country: United States
- Territory: Texas counties of Collin; Dallas; Ellis; Fannin; Grayson; Hunt; Kaufman; Navarro; Rockwall
- Episcopal conference: United States Conference of Catholic Bishops
- Ecclesiastical region: Region X
- Ecclesiastical province: San Antonio
- Coordinates: 32°46′57″N 96°47′51″W

Statistics
- Area: 19,475 km^{2} (7,519 sq mi)
- Population: Total; Catholics: (as of 2021); 4,416,574 (Note: Annuario Pontificio (2022) via Catholic-Hierarchy.org); 1,321,189 (29.9%)
- Parishes: 69

Information
- Denomination: Catholic
- Sui iuris church: Latin Church
- Rite: Roman Rite
- Established: July 15, 1890; 136 years ago
- Cathedral: National Shrine Cathedral of Our Lady of Guadalupe
- Patron saint: Sacred Heart of Jesus
- Secular priests: 146, plus 84 religious priests

Current leadership
- Pope: Leo XIV
- Bishop: Edward J. Burns
- Metropolitan Archbishop: Gustavo Garcia-Siller

Map
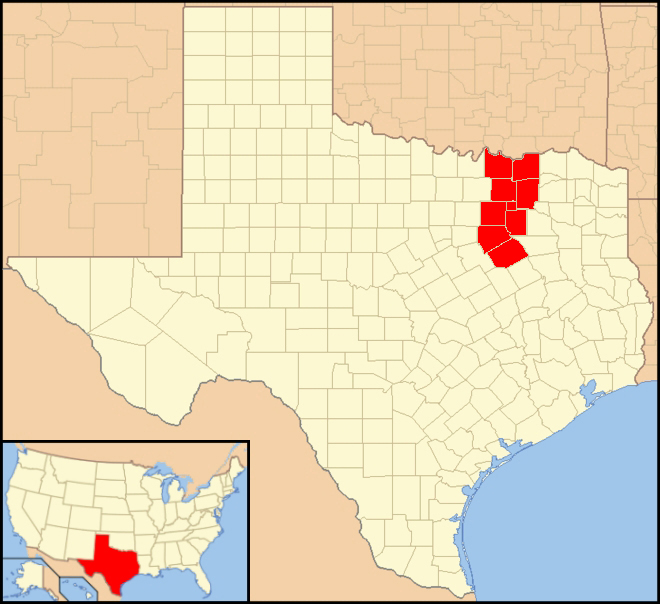

Website
- cathdal.org

The Diocese of Dallas (Latin: Diœcesis Dallasensis) is a Catholic diocese in North Texas in the United States. It is a suffragan diocese of the Archdiocese of San Antonio, founded in 1890. The mother church is the National Shrine Cathedral of Our Lady of Guadalupe in Dallas. The bishop is Edward J. Burns.

== Statistics ==
As of 2021, the Diocese of Dallas had a Catholic population exceeding 1.3 million in 69 parishes. It was served by 230 priests (146 diocesan, 84 religious), 177 permanent deacons, 66 female religious, and 108 male religious.

The diocese comprises nine counties in the state of Texas: Collin, Dallas, Ellis, Fannin, Grayson, Hunt, Kaufman, Navarro and Rockwall.

== History ==
=== Name changes ===
The Dallas area has been under several different Catholic jurisdictions since 1841:

- Prefecture Apostolic of Texas (1841 to 1847)
- Vicariate Apostolic of Texas (1847 to 1874)
- Diocese of Galveston (1874 to 1890)
- Diocese of Dallas (1890 to 1953)
- Diocese of Dallas-Fort Worth (1953 to 1969)
- Diocese of Dallas (1969 to present)

=== 1800 to 1890 ===
By 1868, the Dallas area had only one Catholic family, ministered to by priests from St. Paul in Collin County. A year later, a proto-parish was established, now incorporated into Saint Anthony Parish in Wylie. Joseph Martinere traveled hundreds of miles through swamps and forests to minister to Catholics in the area. The construction of water projects and railroads during the later part of the 19th century increased the immigration of Catholic Irish and German immigrants into North Texas.

Sacred Heart Parish was dedicated in Dallas in 1869, the first parish in that city. The parishioners erected their church in 1872. Six Ursuline nuns in 1874 opened the Ursuline Academy of Dallas, the first Catholic school in Dallas.

In Fort Worth, the first Catholic church, St. Stanislaus Kostka, was opened in 1879.

=== 1890 to 1894 ===
Pope Leo XIII erected the Diocese of Dallas on July 15, 1890, taking its territory from the Diocese of Galveston. The Diocese of Dallas at its inception included most of northern and central Texas. The pope appointed Thomas Brennan of the Diocese of Erie as the first bishop of the new diocese.

Wanting to retire the diocesan debt, Brennan tried to use the Ursuline Academy of Dallas as collateral property to the banks for better financing. However, the Ursuline Sisters objected, saying that the property belonged to them, not the diocese. Brennan then tried to change the Ursuline Order constitution to allow him to get the academy property, but failed.

Some priests and laity in the diocese said that Brennan was embezzling diocese funds for his personal use. The Texas Catholic was accused by Brennan's priests of being a publication "whose sole reason for existence seemed to be...to praise the bishop and his vicar general."

Brennan lobbied the Vatican to raise the Diocese of Dallas to an archdiocese. In a letter to the Congregation for the Propagation of the Faith in Rome, he argued for elevating Dallas instead of the Diocese of San Antonio. Brennan warned that making San Antonio, which was primarily Mexican-American, an archdiocese would lead to the "foreignization of the Southwest."

By July 1892, Brennan's metropolitan superior, Archbishop Francis Janssens of the Archdiocese of New Orleans, had concluded that Brennan was "an impudent letter writer". Janssens also noted that within the Diocese of Dallas "there are signs of much dissatisfaction on account of the arbitrary and uncanonical actions of the Bishop."

During a 1892 visit to the Vatican, Leo XIII forced Brennan to resign as bishop in Dallas. At the time of his resignation, the Catholic population of the diocese had grown to 15,000 served by 30 priests.

=== 1894 to 1954 ===
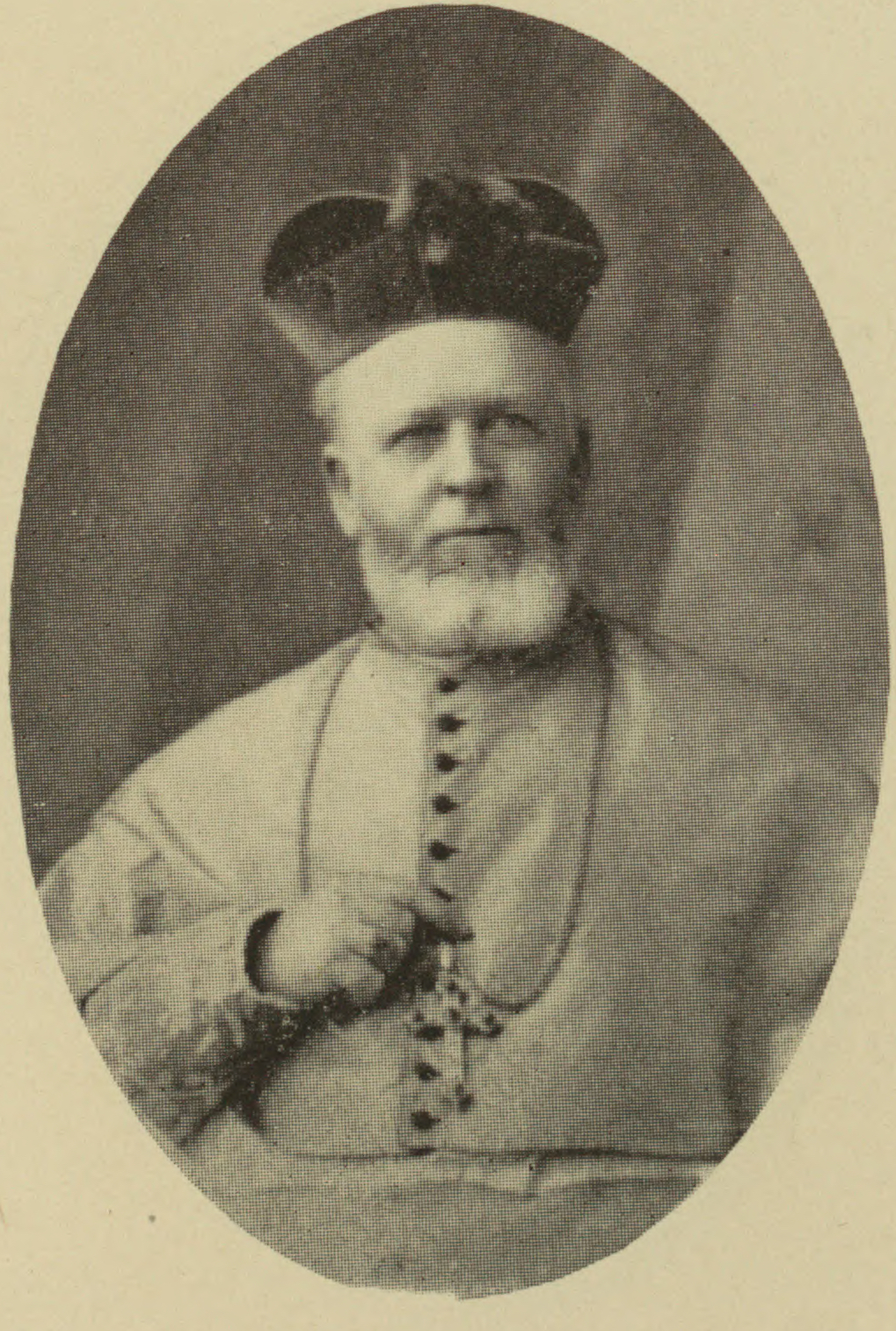
Bishop Dunne (1903)

Leo XIII named Edward Dunne from the Diocese of Chicago as the second bishop of Dallas in 1894. Dunne completed the construction of the diocesan cathedral, which was described as "admittedly the finest in the South-Western States". Dunne also opened Holy Trinity College in Irving. It is today the University of Dallas.

Dunne established the St. Paul Sanitarium in Dallas and St. Anthony's Sanitarium in Amarillo. By 1908, the diocese had 83 priests serving an estimated Catholic population of 60,000. When Dunn died in 1910, the number of churches in the diocese had increased from 28 to 90.

Joseph Lynch was the third bishop of the diocese, named by Pope Pius X in 1911. During the Mexican Revolution of 1910 to 1920, Lynch became an advocate on behalf of Catholic Mexican refugees displaced to Dallas. In 1914, the Vatican erected the Diocese of El Paso in West Texas, taking territory from the Diocese of Dallas. Lynch erected the first mission church in the diocese in Dallas for Mexican Americans in 1915.

In 1926, the Vatican erected the Diocese of Amarillo, taking the Texas Panhandle region from the Diocese of Dallas. Lynch built a segregated church for African-American Catholics at Fort Worth in 1929. Bishop Thomas Gorman from the Diocese of Reno was named coadjutor bishop in Dallas by Pope Pius XII in 1952 to assist Lynch.

In 1953, Pius XII renamed the Diocese of Dallas as the Diocese of Dallas–Fort Worth to reflect the population growth in Fort Worth. He also erected the Diocese of Austin in central Texas, taking some territory from Dallas-Fort Worth.

When Lynch died in 1954, after 43 years as bishop, the Diocese of Dallas-Fort Worth had over 200 religious and charitable institutions founded by him. During his episcopacy, the Catholic population in the diocese had increased from 20,000 to 125,000. Lynch ordained over 100 priests and established 150 churches with 108 parishes.

=== 1954 to present ===
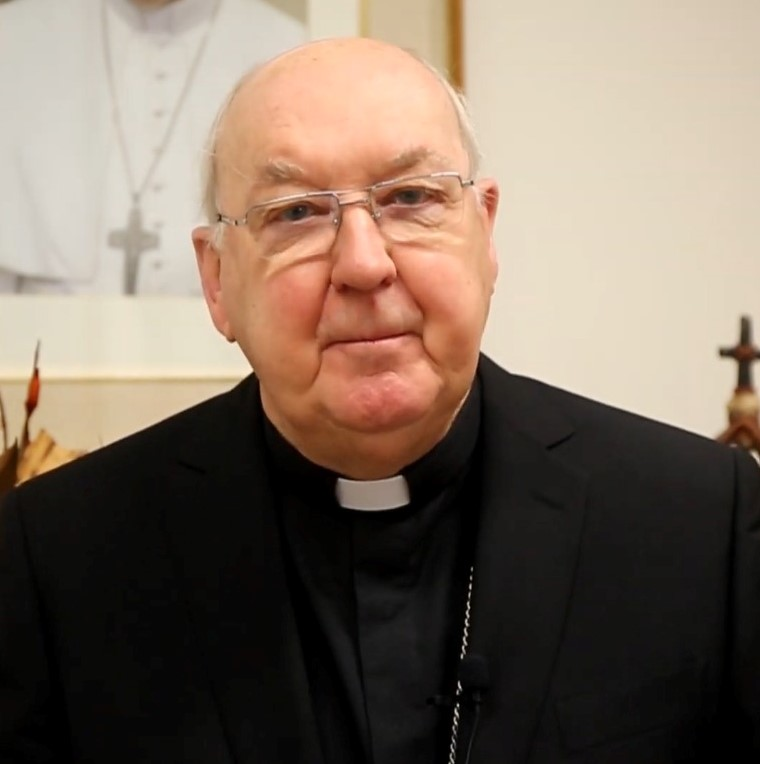
Cardinal Farrell (2021)

After Lynch's death, Gorman succeeded him as bishop of the Diocese of Dallas-Fort Worth. Gorman revived the Texas Catholic newspaper, which had been suspended since 1894. He oversaw construction of 25 parochial schools and 20 new parishes. In 1969, the Vatican separated the Diocese of Dallas-Fort Worth into the Diocese of Dallas and the Diocese of Fort Worth.

Bishop Thomas Tschoepe from San Angelo was appointed by Pope Paul VI in 1969 as bishop of the new Diocese of Dallas. In 1989, the Vatican erected the Diocese of Tyler, taking eastern counties from the Diocese of Dallas. Pope John Paul II in 1989 appointed Bishop Charles Grahmann from the Diocese of Victoria in Texas to serve as a coadjutor bishop in Dallas to assist Tschoepe. Grahmann succeeded him as bishop in 1990.

During his tenure in Dallas, Grahmann created new parishes for Hispanic, Vietnamese and other Catholics moving into the diocese. He also opened the John Paul II High School in Plano. In 1993, the diocese was sued by eight men and the family of a ninth man who had committed suicide. The plaintiffs said they were abused as altar servers by Rudolph Kos, a priest who had served in several parishes in the diocese. In April 1992, a therapist had told diocesan officials that Kos was a "classic textbook pedophile," but the diocese allowed Kos to remain in ministry. He abused another child eleven months later. Bishop Grahmann testified in 1997 that he had never read the therapist's report and allowed Kos to continue his ministry. In 1997, a jury awarded $120 million to the nine plaintiffs. In 1998, Kos was convicted of three counts of aggravated sexual assault and sentenced to life in prison. The diocese eventually settled on paying $23.4 million to the plaintiffs.

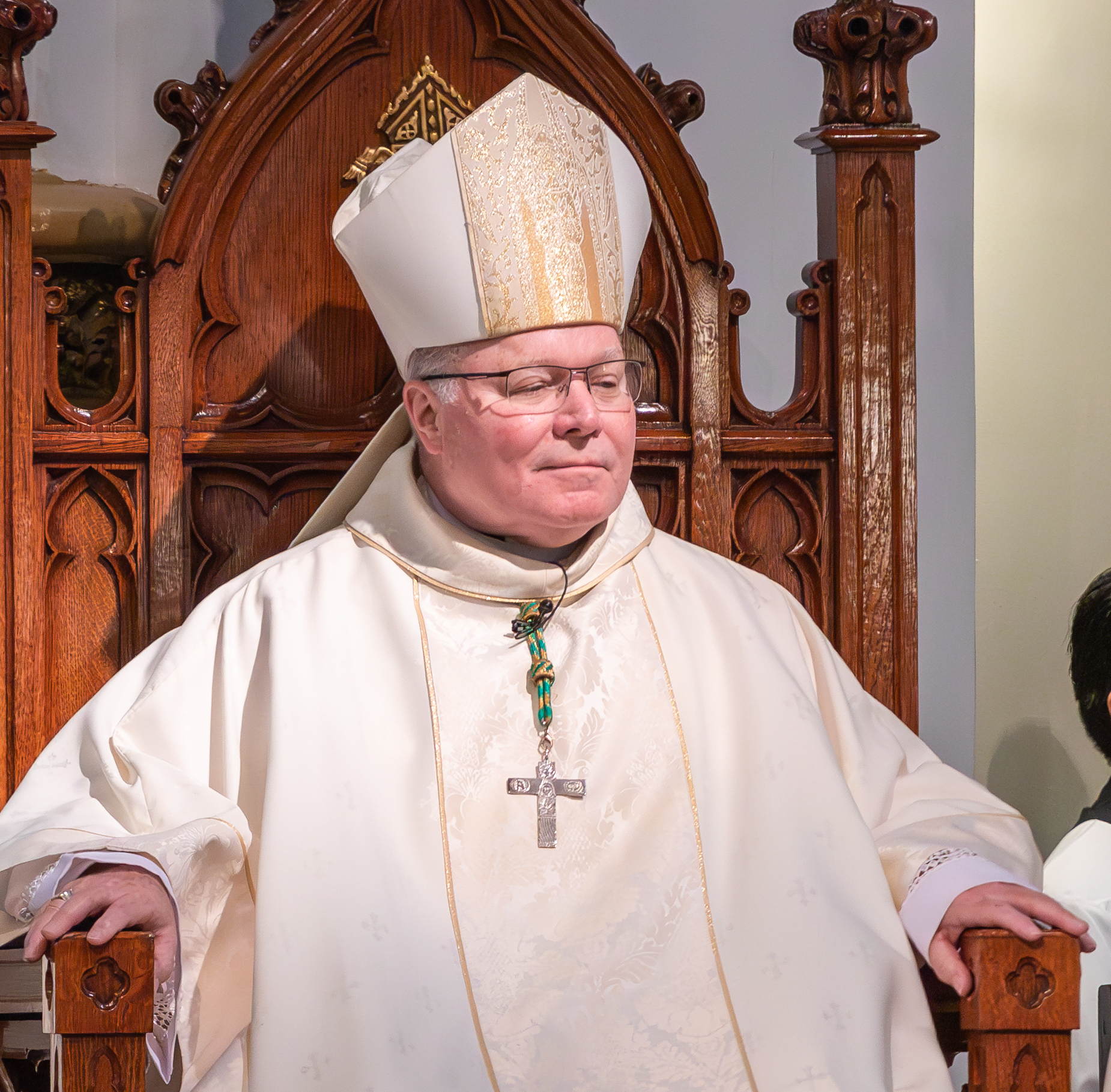
Bishop Burns (2024)

The next bishop of Dallas was Auxiliary Bishop Kevin Farrell from the Archdiocese of Washington, appointed by Pope Benedict XVI in 2007. In 2010, Benedict XVI named J. Douglas Deshotel and Mark J. Seitz as auxiliary bishops of the diocese. In 2016, Pope Francis named Farrell as prefect of the Dicastery for the Laity, Family and Life in Rome. To replace Farrell in Dallas, Francis appointed Bishop Edward J. Burns from the Diocese of Juneau. Gregory Kelly of Dallas was made an auxiliary bishop.

== Bishops ==
=== Bishops of Dallas ===
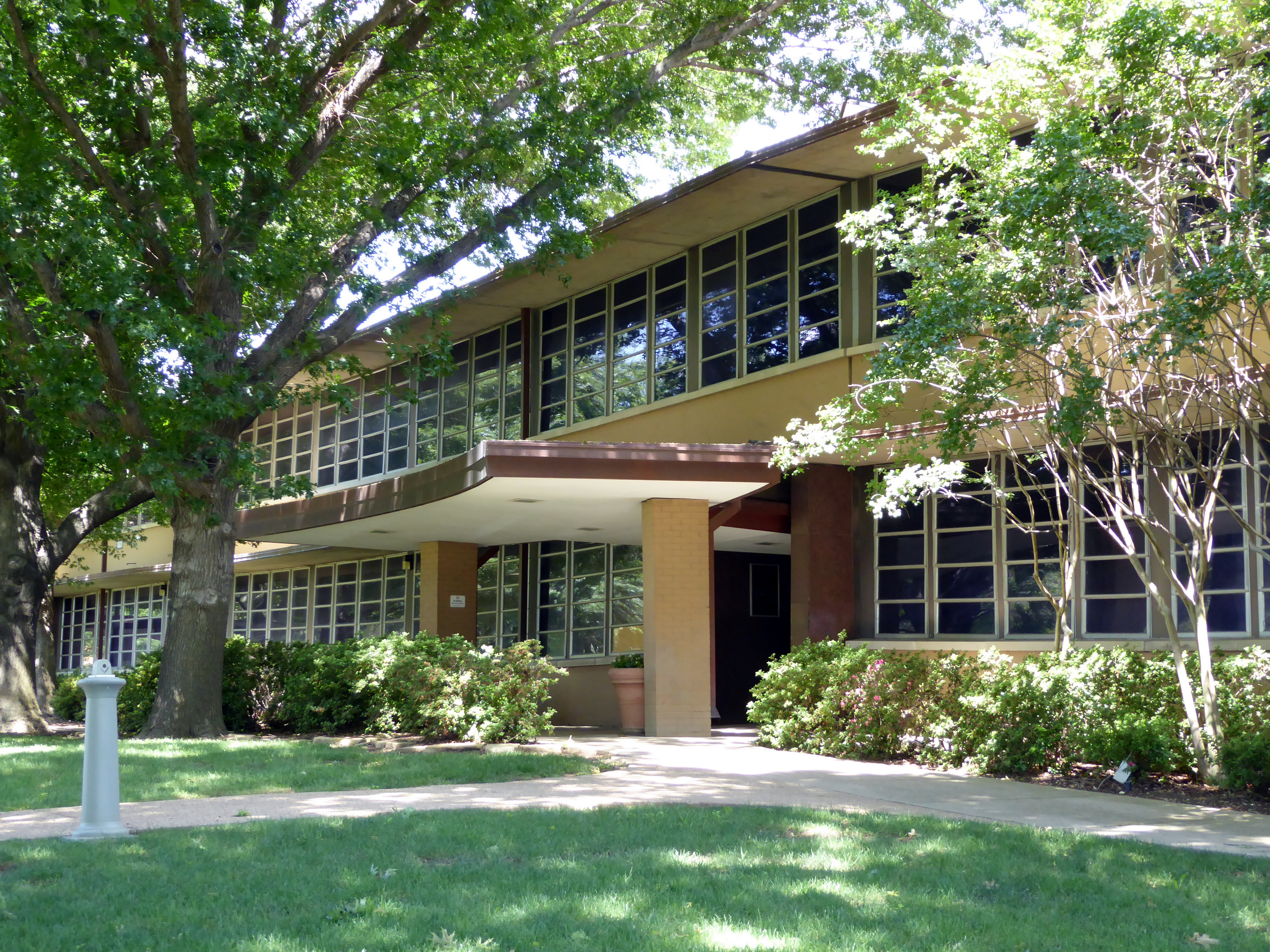
University of Dallas, Dallas, Texas (2016)

1. Thomas Francis Brennan (1891–1892)
2. Edward Joseph Dunne (1893–1910)
3. Joseph Patrick Lynch (1911–1954)

=== Bishops of Dallas-Fort Worth ===
1. Joseph Patrick Lynch (1911–1954)
2. Thomas Kiely Gorman (1954–1969)

=== Bishops of Dallas ===
1. Thomas Kiely Gorman (1954–1969)
2. Thomas Ambrose Tschoepe (1969–1990)
3. Charles Victor Grahmann (1990–2007)
4. Kevin Farrell (2007–2016), appointed Prefect of the Dicastery for the Laity, Family and Life (elevated to cardinal in 2016)
5. Edward James Burns (2016–present)

=== Coadjutor bishops ===
- Thomas Kiely Gorman (1952–1954)
- Charles Victor Grahmann (1989–1990)
- Joseph Anthony Galante (1999–2004), did not succeed to the see; appointed Bishop of Camden

=== Auxiliary bishops ===
- Augustine Danglmayr (1942–1969)
- John Joseph Cassata (1968–1969), appointed Bishop of Fort Worth
- Mark J. Seitz (2010–2013), appointed Bishop of El Paso
- J. Douglas Deshotel (2010–2016), appointed Bishop of Lafayette
- Greg Kelly (2016–2024), appointed Bishop of Tyler

=== Other diocesan priests who became bishops ===
- Rudolph Aloysius Gerken, appointed Bishop of Amarillo in 1926 and later Archbishop of Santa Fe
- Wendelin Joseph Nold, appointed Coadjutor Bishop (in 1947) and later Bishop of Galveston-Houston
- Lawrence Michael De Falco, appointed Bishop of Amarillo in 1963
- Michael Jarboe Sheehan, appointed Bishop of Lubbock in 1983
- David Eugene Fellhauer, appointed Bishop of Victoria in 1990
- Michael Gerard Duca, appointed Bishop of Shreveport in 2008 and later Bishop of Baton Rouge
- Joseph Edward Strickland (priest here, 1985–1987), appointed Bishop of Tyler in 2012
- Robert Milner Coerver, appointed Bishop of Lubbock in 2016

== Coat of arms ==
Coat of arms of the Catholic Diocese of Dallas
| Notes The arms was designed and adopted when the diocese was erected Adopted 1890 Escutcheon The coat of arms of the Diocese of Dallas shows a red background, a diagonal white band, three blue fleurs-de-lis, a solitary white star, and two crossed swords. Symbolism The red background represents the Sacred Heart of Jesus, the diocese's patronal feast. The white band represents the Trinity River. The placement of the band roughly resembles the northwest–southeast path of the Trinity River through Texas. The fleurs-de-lis honors Pope Leo XIII, who erected the diocese; it is taken from his coat of arms. The fleur-de-lis appears three times to represent the Holy Trinity. The star represents Dallas and Texas' nickname, "The Lone Star State". The two swords represent Paul of Tarsus, the patron saint of the first Catholic settlement in northeast Texas. |

== Education ==
As of 2025, the Diocese of Dallas has 36 schools with approximately 13,600 students enrolled.

=== Seminaries ===
- Holy Trinity Catholic Seminary – Irving. Located on University of Dallas campus, seminarians attend classes at the university.
- Redemptoris Mater Seminary – Dallas. Seminary affiliated with the Neocatechumenal Way movement.

=== University ministries ===
- Catholic Student Association – Austin College
- Catholic Student Association – Texas A&M University–Commerce
- University Catholic Center – University of Texas at Dallas
- Catholic Campus Ministry at SMU – Southern Methodist University
- Campus Ministry – University of Dallas

=== High schools ===
As of 2025, there are nine high schools in the Diocese of Dallas:

==== Diocesan high schools ====
- Bishop Dunne Catholic School – Dallas
- Bishop Lynch High School – Dallas
- John Paul II High School – Plano
- Notre Dame School – (special education), Dallas

===== Independent high schools =====
- Cistercian Preparatory School – Irving
- Cristo Rey Dallas College Prep – Dallas
- The Highlands School – Irving
- Jesuit College Preparatory School of Dallas – Dallas
- Ursuline Academy – Dallas
