= Ursuline Academy of Dallas =

School in Dallas, Texas, United States

Location
- 4900 Walnut Hill Lane; Dallas, (Dallas County), Texas 75229; United States; 32°52′41″N 96°49′27″W

Information
- School type: Private, college preparatory school
- Motto: Latin: Serviam (I will serve)
- Religious affiliations: Roman Catholic; Ursulines
- Established: 1874; 152 years ago
- President: Dr. Andrea Shurley
- Principal: Elizabeth Smith
- Teaching staff: 115 (FTE) (2024–25)
- Grades: 9–12
- Gender: All-Girls
- Enrollment: 880+ (2024–25)
- Student to teacher ratio: 9∶1 (2024–25)
- Campus size: 29 acres
- Colors: White; Red
- Athletics: Basketball • crew • cross country • golf • lacrosse • soccer • softball • swimming • tennis • track & field • volleyball • bowling
- Athletics conference: TAPPS
- Mascot: Bear
- Accreditation: ISAS
- Newspaper: Bear Facts
- Yearbook: Acres
- Tuition: $28,100 (2024–25)
- Website: Official website
- Last updated: August 26, 2024; 23 months ago

Ursuline Academy of Dallas (commonly referred to as Ursuline or UA) is a Catholic college preparatory school for girls located on Walnut Hill Lane, in the area around Preston Hollow in Dallas, Texas, USA. It is not a member of the Roman Catholic Diocese of Dallas since it was founded in 1874, before the foundation of the Diocese of Dallas, making it the oldest school in the city of Dallas.

The school was founded by the Ursuline Sisters under the motto of Serviam, meaning "I will serve." Ursuline enrolls an average of 800 students each year with a 10:1 average student-teacher ratio. In 2020, it was awarded 2020 Niche Best Schools #46 Best All-Girls High Schools in America. It was also awarded Niche Best Schools #38 Best Catholic High Schools in America.

== History ==
In 1989 Ursuline Academy of Dallas was designated as a historical landmark of the state of Texas. The historical marker, located in the front lawn of the school, has the following inscription:

"Bishop Claude Marie Dubuis, wishing to establish a Catholic school in the rapidly-growing area of North Texas, assigned six Galveston-based Ursuline nuns to the task in 1874. In January of that year Bishop Dubuis traveled with the sisters to Dallas and assisted them in opening the school. The first facility available to the new academy was a small four-room frame cottage located near Sacred Heart Church in downtown Dallas. The church's pastor, Father Joseph Martiniere, worked closely with the nuns in establishing the school, which officially opened on February 2, 1874, with seven students. As enrollment grew, plans were made to build a larger facility. In 1884 the school moved out of the downtown area to a new brick building located at Bryan, Haskell, and Live Oak streets. That building served the academy until 1949, when the school relocated to this site. Generations of Dallas girls have attended Ursuline Academy. One of the city's first kindergartens opened as part of the academy's program in 1918. Its grammar school section was discontinued in 1976, and the emphasis after that time was placed on high school education."

Beginning in 2009, Ursuline Dallas has partnered with Ursuline High School in Wimbledon, England for a student exchange program. Since then, Ursuline Dallas has grown in the number of exchange opportunities they offer to their students. Their other exchange programs include partnering with St. Ursula's College in Toowoomba, Queensland, Colegio Santa Ursula in Ribeirao, Sao Paulo, Brazil, Colegio Santa Ursula in Santiago, Chile, Beijing Huaxia Girls' School in Beijing, China, College Notre Dame Le Menimur, in Vannes, France, Ahliyyah School for Girls in Amman, Jordan, Colegio Santa Ursula in Lima, Peru, Brescia House School in Johannesburg, South Africa, Stella Matutina Girls School in Taichung, Taiwan, and Ursuline Academy in Wilmington, Delaware.

== Notable alumnae ==
- Melinda French Gates, philanthropist
- Madison Haley, collegiate, professional, and World Cup soccer player
- Candace Johnson, collegiate and World Cup soccer player
- Dorothy Malone, actress
- Alina Garciamendez, collegiate, professional, and World Cup soccer player
- Dina Habib Powell, financial executive, philanthropist, and political advisor
- Lulu Seikaly, attorney, and candidate for U.S. Representative of Texas' 3rd Congressional District
