= Thomas Ambrose Tschoepe =

American Catholic prelate (1915–2009)

His Excellency, The Most Reverend Thomas Ambrose Tschoepe
- Bishop of Dallas
- Church: Catholic; Latin Church
- Diocese: Dallas
- Appointed: August 27, 1969
- Installed: October 29, 1969
- Retired: July 14, 1990
- Predecessor: Thomas Kiely Gorman
- Successor: Charles Victor Grahmann
- Previous post: Bishop of San Angelo (1966‍–‍1969)

Orders
- Ordination: May 30, 1943 by John T. McNicholas
- Consecration: March 9, 1966 by Thomas Kiely Gorman

Personal details
- Born: December 17, 1915 Pilot Point, Texas, US
- Died: January 24, 2009 (aged 93) Dallas, Texas, US
- Motto: Paratum cor meum (Latin for 'My heart is ready')

Styles of Thomas Tschoepe
- Reference style: The Most Reverend
- Spoken style: Your Excellency
- Religious style: Bishop
- Posthumous style: none

Thomas Ambrose Tschoepe (/ˈʃeɪpi/; December 17, 1915 – January 24, 2009) was an American prelate of the Catholic Church. He served as the second bishop of the Diocese of San Angelo in Texas from 1966 to 1969 and as the fifth bishop of the Diocese of Dallas in Texas from 1969 to 1990.

== Biography ==
Thomas Tschoepe was born on December 17, 1915, in Pilot Point, Texas. He was ordained a priest in Worthington, Ohio, by Archbishop John Timothy McNicholas for the Diocese of Dallas on May 30, 1943.

=== Bishop of San Angelo ===
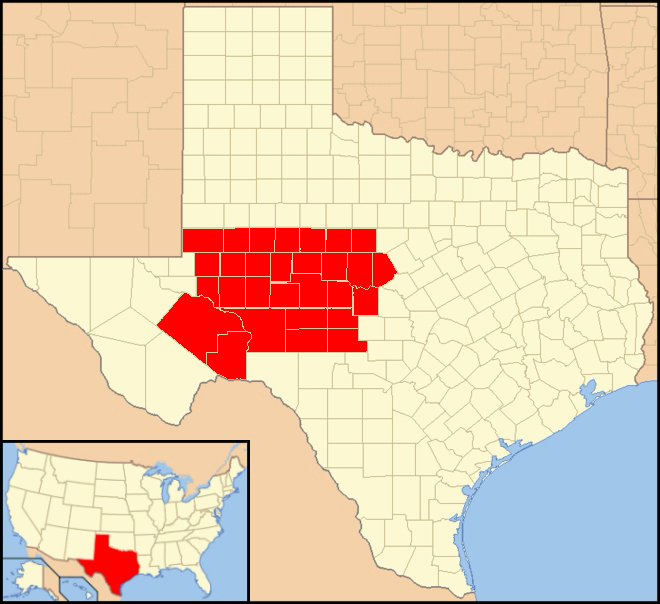
Map of the Catholic diocese of San Angelo

On January 12, 1966, Tschoepe was appointed bishop of San Angelo by Pope Paul VI. Tschoepe was consecrated by Bishop Thomas Kiely Gorman on March 9, 1966.

=== Bishop of Dallas ===
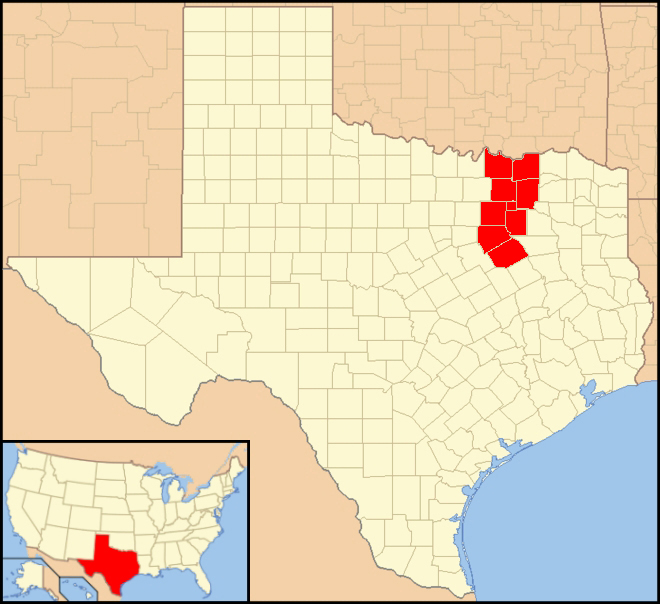
Map of the Catholic diocese of Dallas

On August 27, 1969, Tschoepe was appointed bishop of Dallas by Paul VI. He was installed on October 29, 1969.

During Tschoepe's administration, 21 counties in East Texas were split off into the new Diocese of Tyler, reducing the Diocese of Dallas to nine counties over 7,000 square miles. As bishop, Tschoepe attended a presentation at Holy Trinity Seminary by Reverend Paul Shanley, who spoke of the positive effects of sexual relations between adult males and teenagers. Tschoepe made no objection to this presentation, but did not condone it either.

=== Retirement and legacy ===
Tschoepe retired as bishop of Dallas on July 14, 1990, and was succeeded by Bishop Charles Grahmann. During the early part of his retirement, Tschoepe lived and served at St. Joseph's Parish in Waxahachie, Texas. In his later years he lived at the St. Joseph Retirement Center in south Dallas.

In 1995, it was revealed during a civil lawsuit that Tschoepe had repeatedly ignored reports about a diocesan priest, Rudy Kos, who was participating in sleepovers and inappropriate physical conduct with young boys during the 1980s. In 1991, a therapist who evaluated Kos termed him a textbook pedophile. After an appeal, the diocese agreed in 1998 to pay $23.4 million to the eight victims and the family of a ninth affected by Kos. That same year, Kos was sentenced to life in prison for sexually molesting several boys.

Thomas Tschoepe died in Dallas on January 24, 2009, at age 93.

Catholic Church titles
Preceded by Thomas Joseph Drury	Bishop of San Angelo; 1966–1969	Succeeded by Stephen Aloysius Leven
Preceded by Thomas Kiely Gorman	Bishop of Dallas; 1969–1990	Succeeded by Charles Victor Grahmann
