= Our Lady of Victory Cathedral (Victoria, Texas) =

Catholic church in Texas

Cathedral of Our Lady of Victory
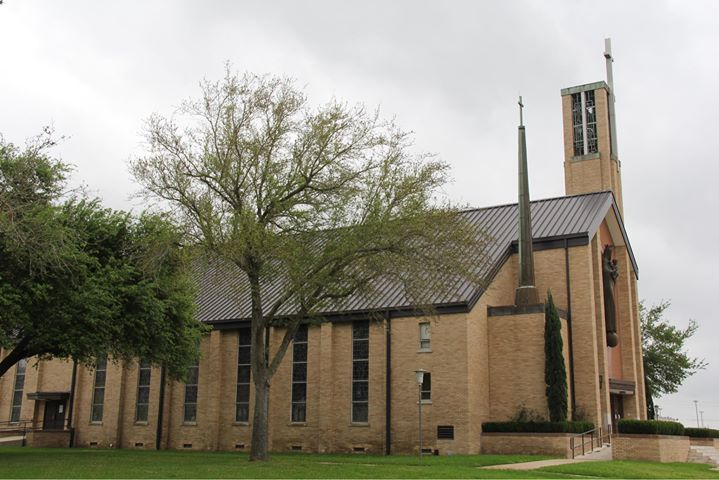

- Location in Texas Cathedral of Our Lady of Victory (the United States)
- 28°49′27″N 96°59′31″W
- Location: 1309 Mesquite Lane; Victoria, Texas
- Country: United States
- Denomination: Catholic Church
- Website: Official website

History
- Status: Cathedral, Parish church
- Founded: 1958
- Dedication: Our Lady of Victory
- Dedicated: July 14, 1958 (by Auxiliary Bishop Stephen A. Leven)
- Consecrated: November 4, 1958

Architecture
- Style: Modern
- Groundbreaking: April 7, 1957
- Completed: 1958

Specifications
- Materials: Brick

Administration
- Diocese: Victoria in Texas

Clergy
- Bishop: Most Rev. Brendan J. Cahill
- Rector: Rev. Kirby Hlavaty
- Vicar: Rev. Dalton Ervin

The Cathedral of Our Lady of Victory is a Catholic cathedral and parish church located in Victoria, Texas, United States. It is the seat of the Diocese of Victoria in Texas.

== History ==
Our Lady of Victory Parish can trace its roots to 1956 when the families of Thomas O'Connor Sr. and Martin O'Connor donated 20 acres (8.1 ha) of land for a new Catholic parish. Tom O'Connor Jr donated over $600,000 to build this beautiful Catholic Church in honor of his wife "Junie" Broussard O'Connor's memory. Our Lady of Victory Cathedral was built in part from his donation and donations from other area Catholics. Mrs. O'Connor's legacy lives on through her family and in the cornerstone of the cathedral that bears her name. The cornerstone for the present church was laid and blessed on April 7, 1957, by Archbishop Robert E. Lucey of San Antonio. The church was dedicated on July 14, 1958, by Auxiliary Bishop Stephen A. Leaven, and solemnly consecrated on November 4, 1958; relics of St. Severian and Pope St. Urban were placed in the altar. Our Lady of Victory Catholic School opened in September 1957. Currently, the school has grade levels ranging from 3k to 8th grade. The school celebrated its 65th anniversary in 2022.

The initial planning for the parish and the construction of the buildings was done by Msgr. Frederick O'Beck who was the pastor at St. Mary's in Victoria. The Rev. Henry Rolf was named the first pastor on July 12, 1958. The parish was officially established the following day.

Pope John Paul II established the Diocese of Victoria in Texas in 1982; the diocese notes its establishment as May 29, 1982, while Catholic-Hierarchy lists the erection/appointment date as April 13, 1982. Our Lady of Victory was designated the cathedral that year.

In 2009 the parish acquired the former Town Plaza Mall located next door to the parish property. The former J.C. Penney store was converted into the Cathedral Center. It houses the parish hall and meeting rooms that are used for receptions, conferences, and various parish programs. Victoria architectural firm Rawley McCoy & Associates was the architect for the project that was completed in 2017. The rest of the mall was sold to the University of Houston–Victoria the same year. A driveway and green space will separate the parish building from the university's facility.

The cathedral suffered water damage during Hurricane Harvey in 2017. Repairs to the roof and the wooden rafters were made at that time. In the summer of 2019, the cathedral was closed for interior renovations necessitated by the water damage from the hurricane. The work included the removal of the murals near the ceiling that had to be re-created on new panels. Other projects included refurbishing the pews, reconditioning the statues, cleaning the walls of mold, restoring the interior woodwork, and repainting the walls while maintaining the integrity of the original murals.

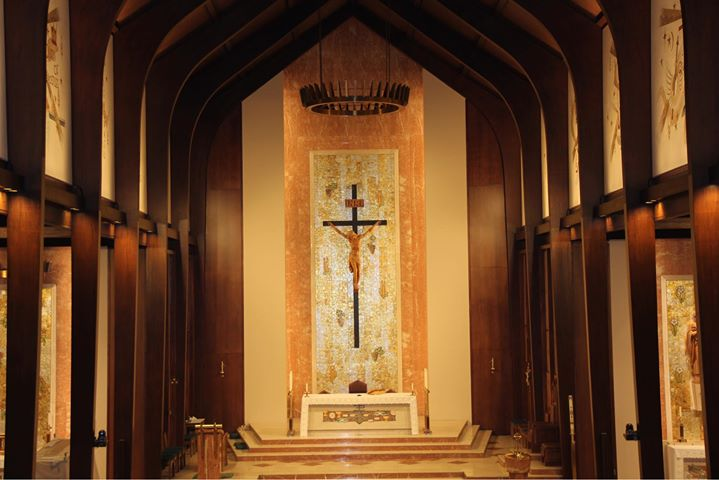
View from the organ tribune to the choir

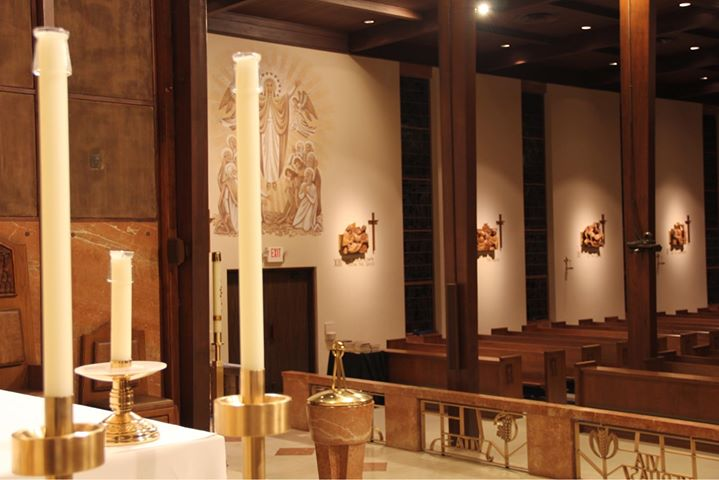
View to the nave

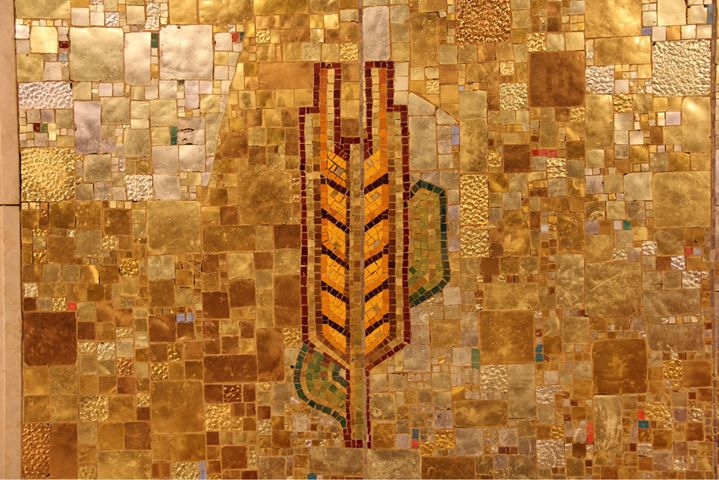
Detail of the altar's mosaics

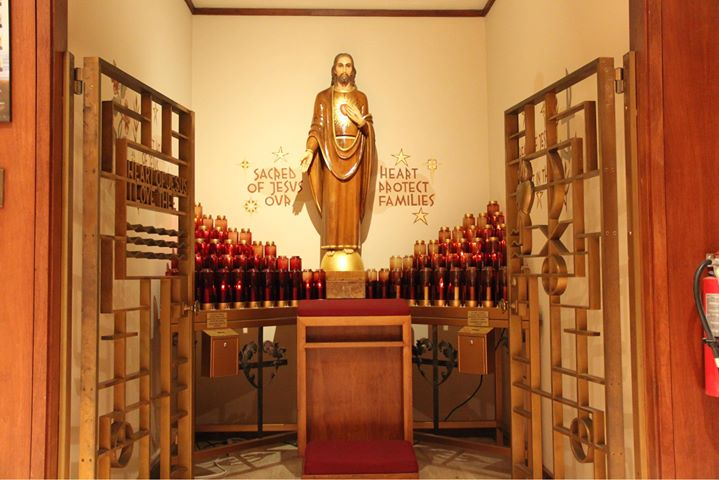
The Sacred Heart chapel

== See also ==
- List of Catholic cathedrals in the United States
- List of cathedrals in the United States
