= Cathedral Santuario de Guadalupe (Dallas, Texas) =

Cathedral Guadalupe
- National Shrine Cathedral of Our Lady of Guadalupe
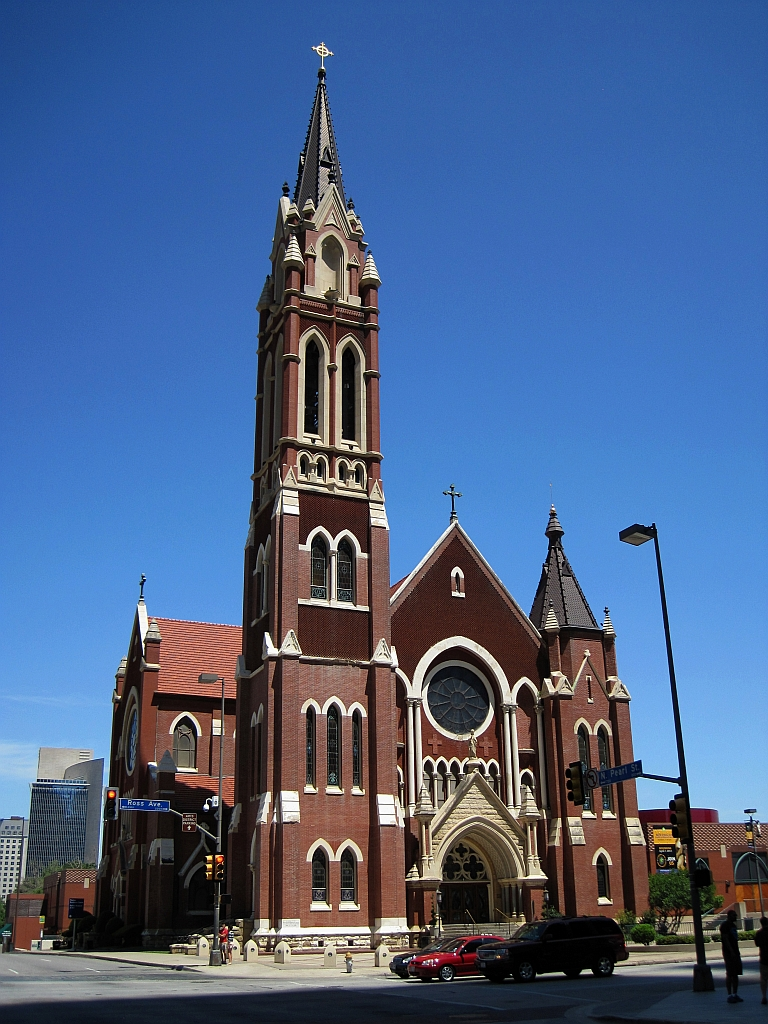

- Location in Texas
- 32°47′19″N 96°47′52″W
- Location: 2215 Ross Ave. Dallas, Texas
- Country: United States
- Denomination: Catholic Church
- Website: www.cathedralguadalupe.org

History
- Founded: 1869
- Dedicated: October 26, 1902

Architecture
- Architect: Nicholas J. Clayton
- Style: Gothic revival
- Groundbreaking: 1898
- Completed: 1902

Specifications
- Materials: Brick

Administration
- Diocese: Diocese of Dallas

Clergy
- Bishop: Most Rev. Edward J. Burns
- Rector: Very Rev. Jesús Belmontes

The National Shrine Cathedral of Our Lady of Guadalupe (Spanish: Catedral Santuario Nacional de Nuestra Señora de Guadalupe) is the cathedral church of the Catholic Diocese of Dallas, Texas. The structure dates from the late 19th century and is located in the Arts District of downtown Dallas, Texas. The church oversees the second-largest Catholic church membership in the United States. Its average Sunday attendance is 11,200.

== History ==
=== Background ===
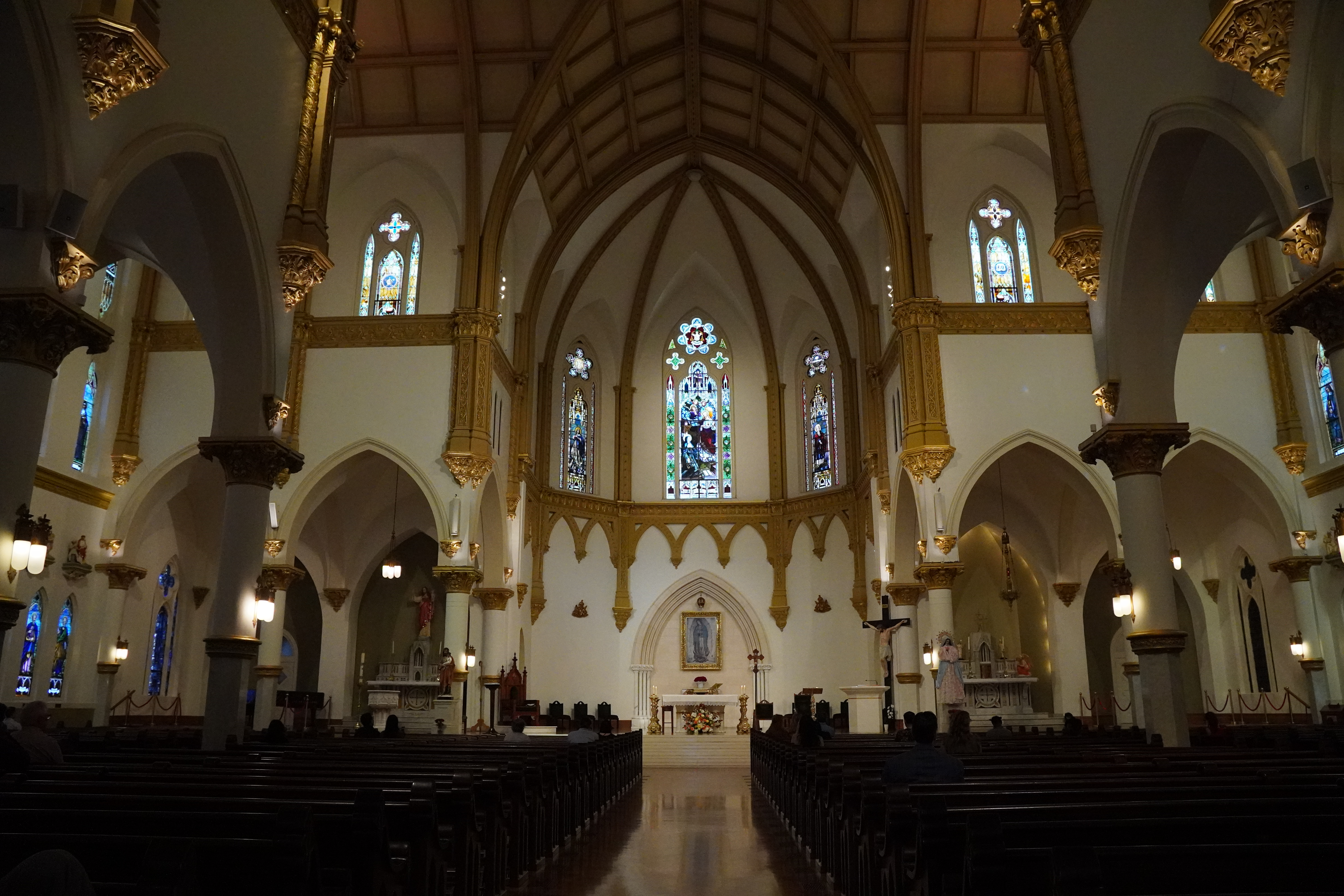
Interior

In 1869, Dallas's first Catholic parish, Sacred Heart Church, was established by the Bishop of Galveston. The church was built in 1872 and was located at Bryan and Ervay Streets, near present-day St. Paul Station.

In 1890, Dallas was established as a diocese, and Sacred Heart became the diocesan cathedral of Dallas with Bishop Thomas Brennan acting as the first bishop. Along with Dallas' tremendous growth at the time, the parish soon outgrew its church building, and the need for a new cathedral arose.

In 2023, the United States Conference of Catholic Bishops elevated the Cathedral Shrine, which has long been a place of pilgrimage, especially for Catholics of Mexico and Latin America, to a National Shrine to highlight its historical and ongoing impact on the community of the area.

=== Construction ===
The property on which the current cathedral is now located was purchased for US$30,000, which adjusted for inflation, is equivalent to over $745,000 in 2025. The cornerstone for the cathedral was laid June 17, 1898 and the church was formally dedicated on October 26, 1902.

=== Consolidation ===
As the Dallas–Fort Worth metroplex grew through the early 20th century, other diocesan parishes were built in neighboring suburbs, decreasing Sacred Heart's attendance. However, by the 1960s the neighboring Our Lady of Guadalupe parish had outgrown its facilities.

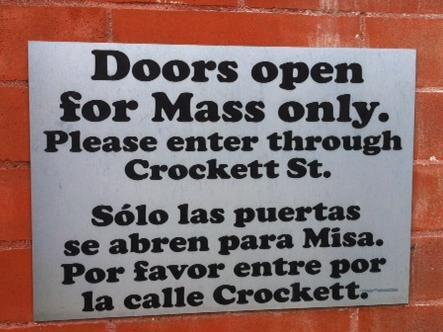
Sign reflecting growing Spanish-speaking population

The parish, located on Harwood Street, was established in 1914 and primarily served Mexican immigrants. Bishop Thomas Tschoepe of Sacred Heart invited Our Lady of Guadalupe to merge with Sacred Heart, and by 1975, the Guadalupe church on Harwood closed following the churches' consolidation. On December 12, 1977, Sacred Heart Cathedral was renamed Cathedral Santuario de Guadalupe—"the Cathedral Shrine of Our Lady of Guadalupe." This reflects the large Spanish-speaking proportion of the congregation, so that the congregation now has masses and various programs in Spanish and English, as well as English classes.

=== Expansion ===
The cathedral recently underwent a major multi-phase renovation project. As part of the project, a $20 million bell tower housing a 49-bell carillon was constructed. The bell tower was planned by the original architect, Nicholas J. Clayton, but had not been built.

== See also ==
- List of Catholic cathedrals in the United States
- List of cathedrals in the United States
- List of buildings and structures in Dallas, Texas
- List of churches under the patronage of Our Lady of Guadalupe
