= World Meeting of Families 2022 =

- Location: Rome
- Country: Italy
- Previous event: 2018
- Next event: 2025 (as "Jubilee of Families")
- Organiser: Diocese of Rome

The World Meeting of Families 2022 was the tenth World Meeting of Families and took place in Rome, Italy in June 2022. It was the third such gathering at this location, following on from the first ever event of its kind in 1994 and a second time in 2000. The event was originally due to be held between 23 and 27 June 2021.

In conjunction with the Dicastery for the Laity, Family and Life, the Diocese chosen to host the World Meeting of Families 2021 was announced in Phoenix Park, Dublin, at the conclusion of the Final Mass of the World Meeting of Families 2018, presided over by Pope Francis on the final day of his visit to Ireland. On May 17, 2019, Pope Francis announced, in a statement which was made public by the Dicastery for Laity, Family and Life, that he had picked "Family love: a vocation and a path to holiness” to serve as the theme for the 2021 World Meeting of Families.

On 20 April 2020, Pope Francis, heeding advice from Dicastery from the Laity, Family and Life Prefect Kevin Farrell, postponed the 2021 World Meeting of Families to June 2022 due to the COVID-19 pandemic. The Vatican claimed it was postponed "due to the current health situation and its consequences for the movement and gathering of young people and families".

Pope Francis preached on the theme of thanksgiving at the event on 25 June 2022.
