= World Meeting of Families 2018 =

World Meeting of Families 2018 Cruinniú Domhanda na dTeaghlach 2018
- Official Logo for WMOF2018
- Begins: 21 August 2018
- Ends: 26 August 2018
- Venue: RDS and others
- Location: Dublin
- Country: Ireland
- Previous event: 2015
- Next event: 2022
- Organiser: Archdiocese of Dublin
- Website: worldmeeting2018.ie (Archived)

The World Meeting of Families 2018 was the ninth World Meeting of Families and took place in Dublin, Ireland between 21 and 26 August 2018. The event began with an Opening Ceremony that occurred in each of Ireland's Dioceses. This was followed by a three-day Pastoral Congress at the RDS. The Meeting culminated in Pope Francis's visit to Ireland.

130,000 people attended the WMOF 2018, which was far below what was expected as when Pope John Paul II came to Ireland in 1979, 2.7 million people came to the event and a similar number was expected at the event in 2018.

== Official hymn ==
On 2 June 2017, the World Meeting of Families 2018's official hymn, "A Joy For All The Earth" (written by Irish composer Ephrem Feeley) was launched in Dublin. Cardinal Kevin Farrell, Prefect of the Dicastery for the Laity, Family and Life, attended the launch. Recording of the hymn took place in Blackrock College Chapel. It features Professor Gerard Gillen on the organ.

== Opening liturgy ==
On the evening of Tuesday 21 August, an Opening Ceremony occurred concurrently over the country's 26 Dioceses, typically (though not exclusively) in that Diocese's Cathedral. The main ceremony that evening occurred in the Archdiocese of Dublin. The Opening Liturgy was titled Le chéile le Críost ("Together with Christ"). Hymns, psalms and canticles were sung, incense was burned and prayers were said.

Details of Opening Ceremony by Diocese
Diocese	Event	Location	Time(s)	Detail(s)
Dublin	Opening Evening Prayer	RDS	7:00 – 8:30 pm	
Achonry	Opening Ceremony	Cathedral of the Annunciation of the Blessed Virgin Mary and St Nathy, Ballaghaderreen	8.00 pm	A gathering of the Diocese's 23 parishes - eleven from County Sligo, eleven from County Mayo and the Cathedral Parish of Ballaghaderreen in County Roscommon, this will have the theme "The family that prays together stays together" and "A world at prayer is a world at peace" in reference to the Venerable Fr. Patrick Peyton, C.S.C., a native of the Diocese and known worldwide as "The Rosary Priest".
Ardagh and Clonmacnoise	Opening Ceremony	St Mel's cathedral, Longford	7.30 pm	
Armagh	Opening festival, then music and Evening Prayer	Shambles Market	5:00 pm - Festival; 7:00 pm: Procession; 7:30 – 8:15 pm: Evening Prayer	The procession went from the Shambles Market to St Patrick's Cathedral.
Cashel and Emly	Liturgy of Evening Prayer	Cathedral of the Assumption, Thurles	7.30 pm	The opening verses of "A Joy for all the Earth" were sung. Saints and Holy Wells associated with the Diocese were named. After a reading of the Parable of the Farmer Scattering Seed, sods of earth from each parish in the Diocese were joined in an earthen map. The Diocesan WMOF2018 Candle was lit from the Paschal Candle and there was a liturgical dance to the music of the hymn "Criost Liom". Prayers were recited by families, the Magnificat was sung, the "Our Father" mimed and the final verses of "A Joy for all the Earth" were sung to bring the occasion to a close. Afterwards, light refreshments were offered in the Pallottine College, hospitality provided by the Pallottine Fathers.
Clogher				
Clonfert	Evening Prayer	St Brendan's Cathedral, Loughrea	6:00 pm - Church bells 7:00 pm: Evening Prayer	All the bells of the Diocese were rung at 6:00 pm. Evening Prayer followed an hour later. Symbols of earth, light and water featured. Themes were past, present and future. A tree was planted.
Cloyne	Evening Prayer	St Colman's Cathedral, Cobh	7:30 pm - Evening Prayer and church bells	Each parish in the Diocese was requested to ring their church bell at 7:30 pm. The Cloyne Diocesan Choir was involved in the Evening Prayer. Refreshments followed.
Cork and Ross	Opening Ceremony	Cathedral of St Mary and St Anne, Cork City	7:30 pm	A candle was given to a family from each parish in the Diocese to bring to their local church where it would be lit for the five days of the WMOF. At the end of the ceremony Bishop John Buckley gave the blessing with the relic of the True Cross. The choir involved people from the Diocese who were to sing at the Papal Mass.
Derry	Opening Ceremony	St Eugene's Cathedral, Derry City	7:00 pm - Evening Prayer; 7:30 pm - Mass	
Down and Connor				
Dromore	Mass incorporating the Evening Prayer of the Church	Newry Cathedral	7:00 pm	Main Celebrant of the Mass was Bishop Philip Boyce.
Elphin	Evening Prayer	Cathedral of the Immaculate Conception, Temple Street, Sligo City	7:00 pm	Evening Prayer at the Cathedral preceded the ringing of its bells. Bells were rung at 7:00 pm all around the Diocese.
Ferns	Opening of WMOF 2018	St. Aidan's Cathedral, Enniscorthy	7:30 pm	
Galway	Opening Ceremony	Galway Cathedral	7:30 pm	The ceremony featured a blessing of families with the relic of Blessed Karl of Austria, one of the Church's select number of official saints who was a husband and father. The ceremony on 21 August will focus on the importance of family life. The ceremony was preceded at 7:00 pm by a talk on Blessed Karl of Austria, given by his great-grandson, Imre.
Kerry	Opening Mass	St Mary's Cathedral, Killarney, Killarney	6:15 pm	Music ministry was led by the recently established Diocesan choir which would assemble with others at the Papal Mass. Before the Opening Mass, church bells were rung all over the Diocese at 6:10 pm.
Kildare and Leighlin	Opening Ceremony	Cathedral of the Assumption, Carlow	6:00 pm: Refreshments in St Leo's College; 6:50 pm: Gathering on front lawn of Carlow College; 7:00 pm: Cathedral bells rung; 7:05 - 7:20 pm: Killeshin Pipe Band led people into the cathedral; 7:30 pm: Opening Ceremony	Bishop Denis Nulty led a Solemn Evening Prayer. Cardinal Peter Turkson from Ghana was Homilist. A choir of more than 150 people sang., Pilgrims visited from Russia, Belarus and Poland.
Kilmacduagh and Kilfenora				
Killala	Opening Service of Prayer	St Muredach's Cathedral, Ballina	8:00 pm	Each parish in the Diocese carried a banner and was part of each of the Prayers. 20 youngsters led a reflection on the Road of Life using shoes. The Diocesan Petition Box was brought forth with an enormous hand-woven globe.
Killaloe	Prayer Liturgy	Our Lady of the Rosary Church, Nenagh	7:00 pm	
Kilmore	Special Celebration of Evening Prayer	St. Ninnidh's Church, Derrylin, County Fermanagh (Parish of Knockninny)	7:30 pm	Presided over by Bishop of Kilmore, Leo O'Reilly. Refreshments in the adjacent primary school succeeded the ceremony.
Limerick	Street Party and Celebration Liturgy	St. John's Square, Limerick City	3:30 - 6:30 pm: Street Party; 7:00 pm: Celebration Liturgy	Free food, face painting, music and magic was promised.
Meath	Opening Ceremony	St Mary's Church, Drogheda	7:00 pm: Drama performance in Holy Family Church; 7:45 pm: Procession to St Mary's Church; 8:30 pm: Evening Prayer in St Mary's Church; 9:15 pm: Refreshments in St Mary's Pastoral Centre	Holy Family Youth Group performed their drama "A Little bit of Francis" in Holy Family Church in Ballsgrove, then onwards with a procession to St Mary's Church. Music for the evening was provided by choirs from Holy Family & Laytown/Mornington parishes.
Ossory	Solemn Evening Prayer	St Mary's Cathedral, James's St, Gardens, Kilkenny City	7:00 pm: Ringing of church bells as invitation to Evening Prayer; 7:30 pm: Evening Prayer	A free cup of tea was promised afterwards.
Raphoe	Opening Ceremony	Cathedral of St Eunan and St Columba, Letterkenny	7:30 pm	Bishop Alan McGuckian SJ, Ireland's first Jesuit bishop, led Evening Prayer. Each parish in the Diocese was referenced as families bore their Parish Banner in procession.
Tuam	Ecumenical Celebration	Cathedral of the Assumption of the Blessed Virgin Mary, Tuam	7:30 pm	Archbishop Michael Neary and Dean Alistair Grimason presided over an Ecumenical celebration of evening prayer. The cathedral's bells rang out to mark the beginning of the event. The entrance procession featured representatives from the eight Deaneries of the Diocese who bore their respective banners. Symbols representing the Diocese's faith were brought forth in the presentation ceremony. Archbishop Neary lit a candle, signifying the Official Opening of WMOF2018. The Cathedral Choir and the Tuam Children's Choir sang. The Psalms and Canticle were presided over by a father and his son, a mother and her daughter and a recently married couple. The Petition Box, which, alongside the Icon of the Holy Family, went throughout the Diocese ahead of the event, was brought forth in procession.
Waterford and Lismore	Solemn Evening Prayer	Cathedral of The Most Holy Trinity, Barronstrand Street, Waterford City	7:00 pm: Ringing of church bells calling families to prayer 7:30 pm: Evening Prayer	Members of other churches were present. Refreshments were promised afterwards.

== Pastoral Congress ==
The three-day Pastoral Congress occurred at the RDS between Wednesday 22 and Friday 24 August. There were daily workshops and discussions, with activities also designated for children between the ages of four and twelve and those between the ages of thirteen and seventeen. The centrepiece of every day was the Eucharist, celebrated in the Main Arena. Family activities at all times while the Mass was not underway. There was also a special "Voices of Impact: Women in Leadership Symposium" at the RDS on the Saturday morning of 26 August, ahead of Mass and live-feed broadcast of Pope Francis's Itinerary as he arrived in Ireland. There was, however, some disappointment expressed by a group which said it represented LGBT Catholics; the group said it felt excluded from the event after its request for a stall was turned down. Exhibition coordinator Paul McCann said the decision was made due to "uncertainty over the amount of space we will have available." The humanitarian campaign, Equal Future 2018, was launched during the course of the Pastoral Congress, with the intention of raising awareness around the world of the damage done to children and young people by LGBT stigma.

Pastoral Congress Programme
Date	Theme	Main celebrant & Homilist	Main Arena Keynote Speaker
Wednesday 22 August	The Family and Faith. Themes from Chapters 1 to 3 of The Joy of Love	Cardinal Oswald Gracias, Archbishop of Bombay, India	Archbishop Eamon Martin, Archbishop of Armagh, Primate of All Ireland and President of the Irish Bishops' Conference
Thursday 23 August	The Family and Love. Themes from Chapters 4 to 6 of The Joy of Love.	Cardinal João Braz de Aviz, Prefect of the Congregation for Institutes of Consecrated Life and Societies of Apostolic Life	Cardinal Vincent Nichols, Archbishop of Westminster, England
Friday 24 August	The Family and Hope. Themes from Chapters 7 to 9 of The Joy of Love.	Cardinal Kevin Farrell, Prefect of the Dicastery for the Laity, Family and Life	Cardinal Mario Zenari, Apostolic Nuncio to Syria

== Festival of Families ==
The Festival of Families occurred at Croke Park on Saturday 25 August and marked the official arrival of Pope Francis at the World Meeting of Families. There were three hundred flag bearers. The Pope addressed those in attendance, heard the testimonies of five families from Burkina Faso, Canada, India, Iraq and Ireland, and he and the audience were entertained by an orchestra comprising more than fifty musicians; a choir of one thousand voices; more than seven hundred Irish, sean-nós and contemporary dancers; Daniel O'Donnell, Riverdance, an Andrea Bocelli and Celine Byrne duet of Franz Schubert's "Ave Maria" and Bocelli's rendition of "Nessun Dorma", the aria from the final act of Giacomo Puccini's opera Turandot. Patrick Bergin was onstage singing the Leonard Cohen song "Anthem" as the Pope arrived. Pope Francis also had a selfie taken with Alison Nevin, a twelve-year-old girl with medical issues from Swords, County Dublin.

== Knock Shrine ==
On the morning of Sunday 26 August, Pope Francis made a pilgrimage to Knock Shrine in County Mayo in the West of Ireland. Though a personal pilgrimage by Francis, after his announcement that he would be attending the conclusion of the World Meeting of Families 2018 and the expression of his wish to see the national Marian Shrine, this was added to the list of events on the website of the World Meeting of Families as being part of its programme, with the note that the anniversary of the Apparition of Our Lady coincided with the opening day of the World Meeting of Families 2018. The Pope paraded around the gathering pilgrims in his popemobile and prayed a rendition of the Angelus at the Apparition Chapel. He became the second Pope to visit Knock Shrine, following on from Pope John Paul II.

== Final Mass ==
A Solemn Eucharistic Celebration commencing at 3:00 pm on Sunday 26 August and presided over by Pope Francis, at Phoenix Park in Dublin, brought about the conclusion of the World Meeting of Families 2018. In conjunction with the Dicastery for the Laity, Family and Life, the Diocese chosen to host the expected World Meeting of Families 2021 was announced at the Mass's conclusion. This was revealed to be Rome.

Pope Francis surrounded by thousands of people while travelling through the crowds in the Pope mobile before saying the Final Mass at the Papal Cross in Phoenix Park.

== Criticisms ==
In November 2017, Bishop Brendan Leahy said that LGBT people must be made welcome at WMOF 2018. However, the Irish Bishops were overruled by Cardinal Kevin Farrell and all positive references to LGBT people included in WMOF materials were removed and LGBT people were told they were not welcome to attend. In April 2018, in response to the removal of LGBT references from WMOF materials, the organisers of Dublin Pride announced "We Are Family" as their 2018 theme. In August 2018, Mary McAleese, former President of Ireland and Catholic academic, confirmed she would not attend any of the WMOF events as she felt she and her family were not welcome. McAleese claimed the event was a "right wing rally" opposed to women and LGBT people. Ursula Halligan, a prominent Catholic and gay activist, organised a choir to sing outside the WMOF venue to highlight the perceived opposition to LGBT people. In August 2018, Allianz Insurance issued a statement denying they were "headline sponsors" of the event following a claim made by businesswoman and entrepreneur Norah Casey on RTÉ. In October 2019, The Times reported that the event raised €11 million through fundraising in Ireland (€9 million less than intended) and incurred losses of €4.4 million.
