= Kevin Farrell =

Irish-American Catholic cardinal (born 1947)

His Eminence Kevin Farrell KGCHS
- Prefect of the Dicastery for the Laity, Family and Life; Camerlengo of the Holy Roman Church
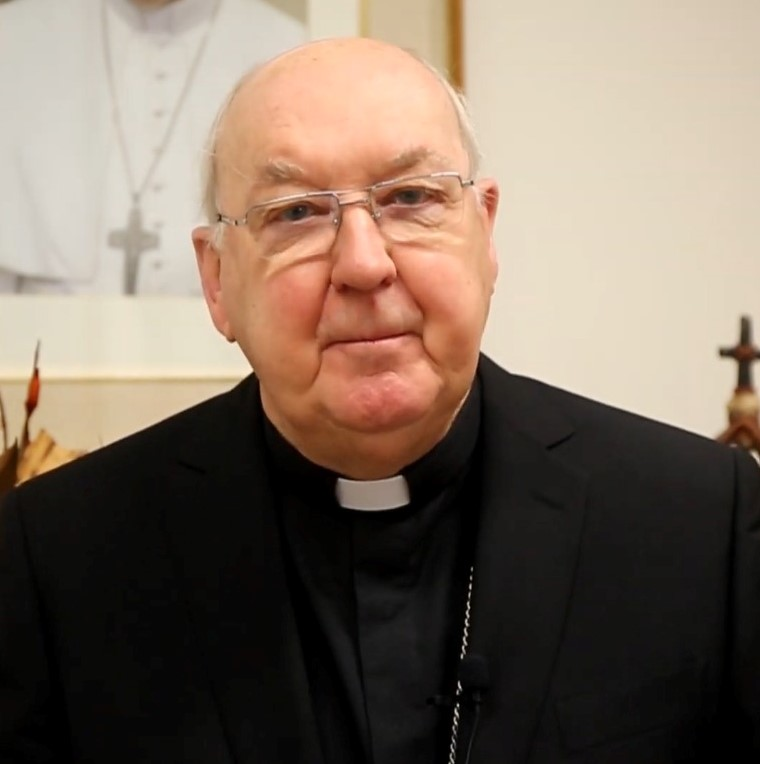
- Farrell in 2021
- Church: Catholic Church
- Appointed: 15 August 2016
- Installed: 14 February 2019 (as Camerlengo)
- Predecessor: Jean-Louis Tauran (Camerlengo)
- Other posts: Cardinal-Deacon of San Giuliano Martire (2016‍–‍present); President of the Pontifical Commission for Confidential Matters (2020‍–‍present); Chair of the Pontifical Committee for Investments (2022‍–‍present)
- Previous posts: Bishop of Dallas (2007‍–‍2016); Auxiliary Bishop of Washington and Titular Bishop of Rusuccuru (2001‍–‍2007)

Orders
- Ordination: 24 December 1978 by Eduardo Francisco Pironio
- Consecration: 11 February 2002 by Theodore Edgar McCarrick
- Created cardinal: 19 November 2016 by Pope Francis
- Rank: Cardinal deacon

Personal details
- Born: Kevin Joseph Farrell; 2 September 1947 (age 79) Dublin, Ireland
- Motto: State in fide (Latin for 'Stay firm in the faith')
- Styles
- Reference style: His Eminence
- Spoken style: Your Eminence
- Religious style: Cardinal
- Informal style: Cardinal

Ordination history
History
Priestly ordination
- Ordained by: Eduardo Francisco Pironio
- Date: 24 December 1978
- Place: Basilica of Our Lady of Guadalupe and Saint Philip the Martyr, Rome, Italy
Episcopal consecration
- Principal consecrator: Theodore Edgar McCarrick
- Co-consecrators: James Aloysius Hickey, Leonard Olivier
- Date: 11 February 2002
- Place: Basilica of the National Shrine of the Immaculate Conception, Washington, DC
Cardinalate
- Elevated by: Pope Francis
- Date: 19 November 2016
Episcopal succession
Bishops consecrated by Kevin Farrell as principal consecrator
- J. Douglas Deshotel: 2010
- Mark J. Seitz: 2010
- John Gregory Kelly: 2016

Kevin Joseph Farrell (born 2 September 1947) is an Irish American Catholic prelate who has served as the prefect of the Dicastery for the Laity, Family and Life since 2016, camerlengo of the Holy Roman Church since 2019, and president of the Supreme Court of Vatican City since 2024. He served as the regent of Vatican City after the death of Pope Francis on 21 April 2025, and held these interim duties until Leo XIV was elected as pope on 8 May.

After his ordination in 1978, Farrell served as a chaplain and university teacher for several years in Mexico and worked in the United States from 1984 to 2016. He was an auxiliary bishop of the Archdiocese of Washington from 2002 to 2007 and Bishop of Dallas from 2007 to 2017. He was made a cardinal in 2016.

== Biography ==
=== Early life and education ===
Farrell was born on 2 September 1947, in Dublin, Ireland. He is the second of four sons. His older brother is Brian Farrell, who was appointed secretary of the Pontifical Council for Promoting Christian Unity in the Roman Curia in 2002.

He entered the novitiate of the Legionaries of Christ in Ireland in 1966. He then studied at the Pontifical Gregorian University in Rome, where he earned a Master of Philosophy degree and Licentiate in Theology. He also attended the Pontifical University of St. Thomas Aquinas, receiving a Master of Theology degree in dogmatic theology (1976) and a Licentiate of Sacred Theology in pastoral theology (1977). He also holds a Master of Business Administration degree from the University of Notre Dame. Notre Dame also granted Farrell an honorary Doctor of Laws degree in 2017.

=== Priesthood ===
Farrell was ordained to the priesthood for the Legionaries of Christ by Cardinal Eduardo Pironio in Rome at the Basilica of Our Lady of Guadalupe and Saint Philip the Martyr on 24 December 1978. After his ordination, Farrell served as a chaplain at the University of Monterrey in Monterrey, Mexico, where he also conducted seminars in bioethics and social ethics.

In the early 1980s, Farrell left the Legionaries to be incardinated in the Archdiocese of Washington in the United States. In 1984, Farrell was assigned as an associate pastor at St. Peter's Parish in Olney, Maryland. He also served at St. Bartholomew Parish in Bethesda, Maryland, and at St. Thomas the Apostle Parish in Washington, D.C. In 1985, Farrell was appointed director of the archdiocesan Spanish Catholic Center.

Farrell became acting director of Catholic Charities in the archdiocese in 1988, and served as secretary for financial affairs from 1989 to 2001. The Vatican raised him to the rank of monsignor in 1995. In 2001, Farrell was named vicar general for the archdiocese and pastor of Annunciation Parish in Washington.

=== Auxiliary Bishop of Washington ===
On 28 December 2001, Pope John Paul II appointed Farrell as an auxiliary bishop of Washington (DC) with the titular see of Rusuccuru. He was consecrated on 11 February 2002, at the Basilica of the National Shrine of the Immaculate Conception in Washington by former Cardinal Theodore McCarrick. His co-consecrators were Cardinal James Hickey and Bishop Leonard Olivier.

Farrell served until 2007 as Washington's moderator of the curia and chief vicar general.

=== Bishop of Dallas ===
Farrell was appointed bishop of Dallas by Pope Benedict XVI on 6 March 2007, replacing Bishop Charles Grahmann. Farrell was installed on 1 May 2007.

According to Farrell's personal website, as bishop of Dallas, many elements of his personal coat of arms were derived from McCarrick's, including the lion rampant and the gold-and-red coloring at the top. The lion itself, as well as the gold coloring of the bottom of the charge, also honors the Irish sept of the name Farrell. The blue at the bottom also honors Our Lady of Lourdes, on whose feast day Farrell was consecrated bishop.

Within the United States Conference of Catholic Bishops (USCCB), Farrell was a consultant to the Committee on Migration, which oversaw the Migration and Refugee Services department.

Farrell was the 2009 chair of the USCCB Committee on National Collections. His brother Brian Farrell is the secretary of the Pontifical Council for Promoting Christian Unity. Kevin Farrell commented on his brother in 2015: "I'm younger, but I became bishop first, 12 months earlier. And we still have a little sibling rivalry."

=== Cardinal ===
On 17 August 2016, Pope Francis appointed Farrell prefect of the newly established Dicastery for Laity, Family and Life in Rome.

On 9 October 2016, Pope Francis announced he would raise Farrell to the rank of cardinal in a consistory on 19 November 2016. He was created a cardinal-deacon on that day and assigned to San Giuliano Martire Parish in Rome. On 10 June 2017, Pope Francis named Farrell a member of the Administration of the Patrimony of the Apostolic See, and on 23 December 2017, a member of the Pontifical Commission for Vatican City State. In July 2018, the University of Dallas named an administration building after Farrell, a former chancellor. On 14 February 2019, Pope Francis named Farrell as camerlengo of the Holy Roman Church.

In June 2019, Farrell admitted receiving a $29,000 gift from Bishop Michael J. Bransfield to refurbish his Rome apartment. A 2018 apostolic visitation to the Diocese of Wheeling-Charleston in West Virginia revealed that Bransfield had been using diocesan funds for these gifts and his own personal spending. Farrell returned the $29,000 to the diocese; Bransfield was removed from office in July 2019.

On 20 April 2020, Farrell persuaded Pope Francis to postpone both the 2021 World Meeting of Families and 2022 World Youth Day to June 2022 and August 2023 respectively due to the COVID-19 pandemic.

On 29 September 2020, Pope Francis appointed Farrell as president of the Commission for Confidential Matters, a new office in the Roman Curia. According to the church's apostolic constitution, Praedicate Evangelium, the commission is responsible "1. to authorize any legal, economic or financial act that for the greater good of the Church or of persons must be kept confidential and removed from the examination and supervision of the competent entities; 2. to monitor contracts of the Holy See which by law demand confidentiality and to exercise vigilance over them."

On 7 June 2022, Pope Francis appointed Farrell as chair of the Pontifical Committee for Investments. According to Praedicate Evangelium, the committee is responsible for "guaranteeing the ethical nature of the Holy See’s equity investments in accordance with the Church’s social doctrine and, at the same time, monitoring their profitability, propriety, and degree of risk.

On 1 January 2024, Farrell was appointed as President of the Supreme Court of Vatican City.

On 20 May 2024, Pope Francis appointed Farrell as special envoy to the LIII International Eucharistic Congress, held from 8 to 15 September in Quito, Ecuador. In November, Francis appointed Farrell as sole director for the Holy See's pension fund, covering the Roman curia and former Vatican City employees.

On 21 April 2025, Farrell announced the death of Pope Francis in a video statement on the Vatican's TV channel. The Vatican announced that Farrell would preside over the rite of ascertainment of death for Francis, to take place on the same evening. He served as the acting sovereign of Vatican City between the death of Pope Francis on 21 April 2025 and the election of Pope Leo XIV on 8 May 2025.

== Controversies ==
=== Association with former Cardinal Theodore McCarrick ===
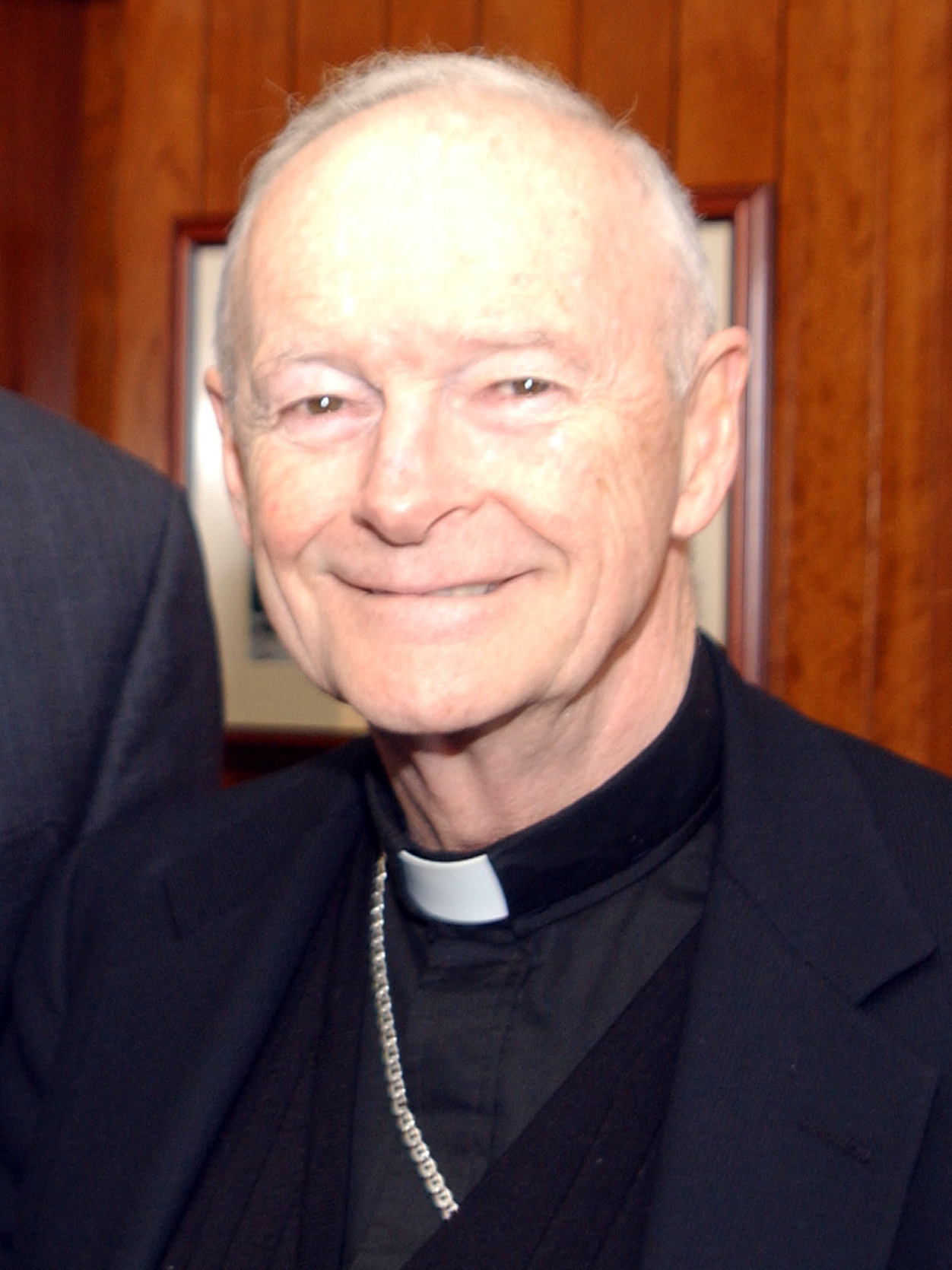
Former Cardinal McCarrick (2002)

After McCarrick was laicized in 2018 for credible allegations of sexual abuse against a minor, further reports of accusations and legal settlements emerged, dating back years. Many newspapers and columnists have questioned whether Farrell and the other bishops who served under McCarrick were aware of the molestation and abuse and decided to do nothing about it. Journalist Michael Sean Winters termed McCarrick as Farrell's "mentor in the episcopacy".

McCarrick had asked the Vatican to appoint Farrell as auxiliary bishop in Washington. Over the next six years, Farrell served as vicar general there. During this time, he shared a four-bedroom apartment with McCarrick and two priest secretaries.

=== World Meeting of Families 2018 ===
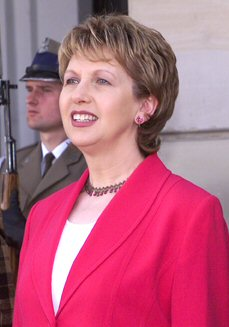
Former Irish President Mary McAleese (2003)

In September 2015, the Vatican announced that the World Meeting of Families (WMOF) would be held in Phoenix Park in Dublin, Ireland, in 2018. In August 2016, Pope Francis appointed Farrell as head of the Dicastery for the Laity, Family and Life. As a result, Farrell took charge of the 2018 WMOF. Farrell said that Francis' visit to Ireland would be "inspirational" and "counter negativity" towards the Irish church. On 18 August 2018, former Irish President Mary McAleese, a critic of the WMOF, said that meeting organizers had not invited her or her family to any of the WMOF events, saying:

It's always been essentially a right wing rally... and it was designed for that purpose, to rally people to get them motivated to fight against the tide of same sex marriage, rights for gays, abortion rights, contraceptive rights."

On 16 August 2018, Cardinal Sean O'Malley, scheduled to lead a "pioneering session on child safeguarding", withdrew from the WMOF. On 18 August Cardinal Donald Wuerl, due to address the conference, also pulled out. Although organizers claimed to have sold over 500,000 tickets to WMOF, the Office of Public Works in Ireland confirmed that the attendance was only 152,000.

== Views ==
=== LGBTQ people ===
In February 2018, Farrell banned former Irish president Mary McAleese, a supporter of women's ordination and same-sex marriage, from speaking at a Vatican conference on Women in the Catholic Church.

On 18 March 2021, Farrell defended a ban by Francis on the blessing of same-sex unions by priests. Farrell stated that a priestly blessing was a sacramental action related to marriage, which could only be between a man and a woman.

=== Gun control ===
Farrell is a supporter of gun control initiatives and opposes "deference to the gun lobby" by the United States Congress.

Catholic Church titles
Preceded by Dennis Walter Hickey	Titular Bishop of Rusuccuru; 28 December 2001 – 6 March 2007	Succeeded by Marek Mendyk
Preceded by Charles Victor Grahmann	Bishop of Dallas; 6 March 2007 – 15 August 2016	Succeeded by Edward James Burns
New title	Prefect of the Dicastery for Laity, Family and Life; 15 August 2016 –	Incumbent
Preceded by Karl Josef Becker	Cardinal-Deacon of San Giuliano Martire; 19 November 2016 –	Incumbent
Preceded by Jean-Louis Tauran	Camerlengo of the Holy Roman Church; 14 February 2019 –	Incumbent
Preceded by Dominique Mamberti	President of the Court of Cassation of Vatican City; 1 January 2024 –	Incumbent
