= World Meeting of Families =

Gathering of the Roman Catholic Church

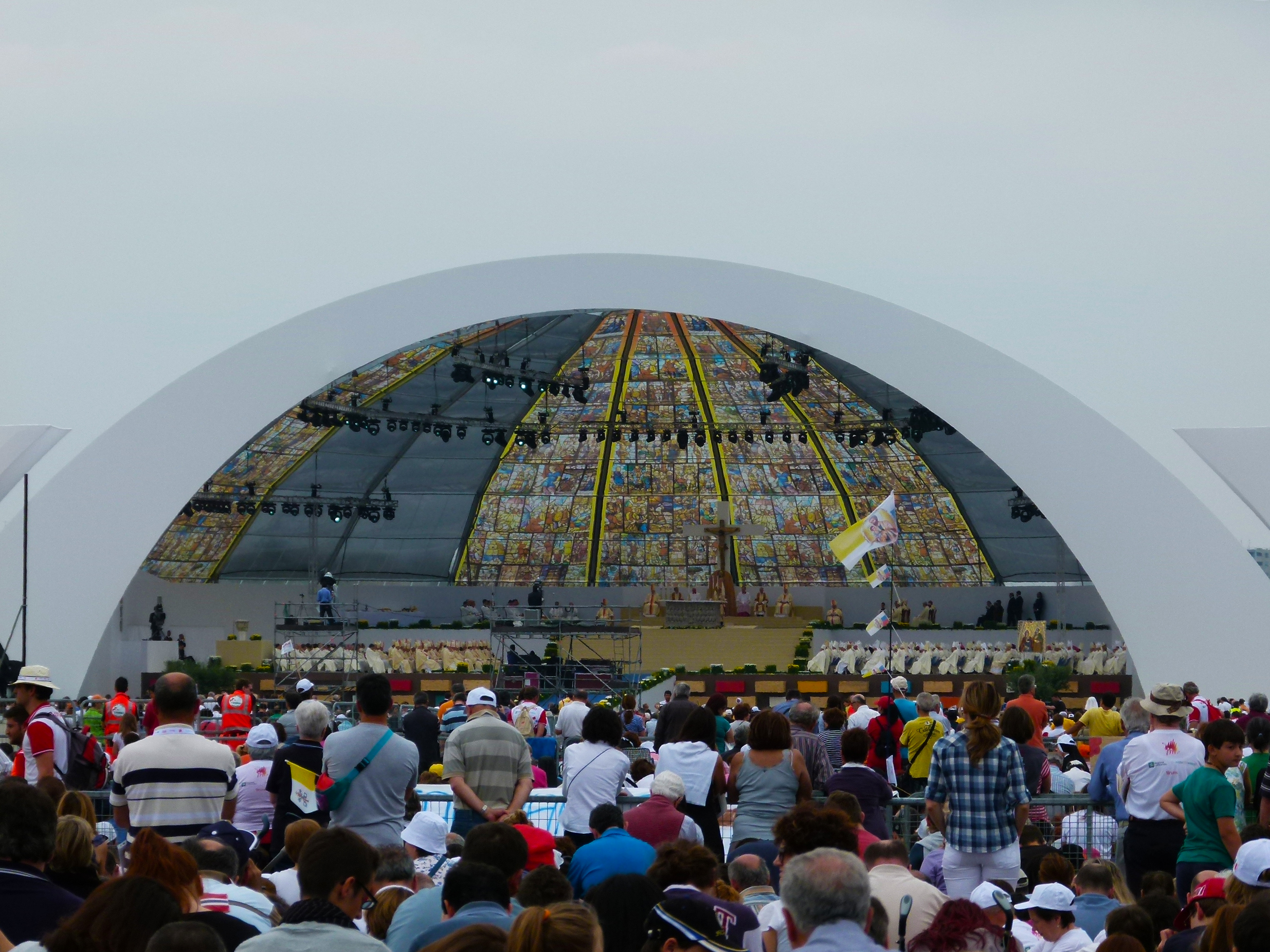
The World Meeting of Families in Milan 2012

The World Meeting of Families is a gathering of the Roman Catholic Church that has occurred every three years since 1994. It is organized by the Dicastery for Laity, Family and Life, which "promotes the pastoral care of families, protects their rights and dignity in the Church and in civil society, so that they may ever be more able to fulfill their duties." It is the largest gathering of Catholic families in the world. The most recent meeting took place in Rome, Italy in 2022 (it was supposed to be held in 2021, but was postponed to 2022 due to the COVID-19 pandemic).

== Events ==
World Meeting of Families events
Date	City	Country	Theme	Notes
1994	Rome	Italy	The Family, the Heart of the Civilization of Love	
1997	Rio de Janeiro	Brazil	The Family: Gift and Commitment, the hope of humanity	
2000	Rome	Italy	Children: Springtime of the Family and of the Church	Part of the Great Jubilee
2003	Manila	Philippines	The Christian Family: Good News for the Third Millennium.	Scheduled to be the first papal visit to the Philippines in the 21st century and 3rd millennium and the fourth visit overall, but cancelled and instead the first in the said century and millennium is Pope Francis' visit to the country 12 years later in 2015 because Pope John Paul II was not able to attend physically due to the progression of his Parkinson's disease.
2006	Valencia	Spain	Handing on the Faith in the Family	
2009	Mexico City	Mexico	The Family: Teacher of Human and Christian Values	
2012	Milan	Italy	Family, Work & Celebration	
2015	Philadelphia	United States	Love is our mission: The family fully alive	
2018	Dublin	Ireland	The Gospel of the Family: Joy for the World	Pope Francis's visit to Ireland was centred on the meeting.
2022	Rome	Italy	Family love: a vocation and a path to holiness	Was originally scheduled to be held on the 5th Anniversary of the post-Synod of Youth Apostolic Exhortation of Amoris laetitia and three years after the promulgation of the Apostolic Exhortation of Gaudete et Exsultate However, the 2021 World Meeting of Families was later postponed to June 2022 due to the COVID-19 pandemic.

== See also ==
- World Youth Day
