= 53rd International Eucharistic Congress =

2024 International Eucharistic Congress
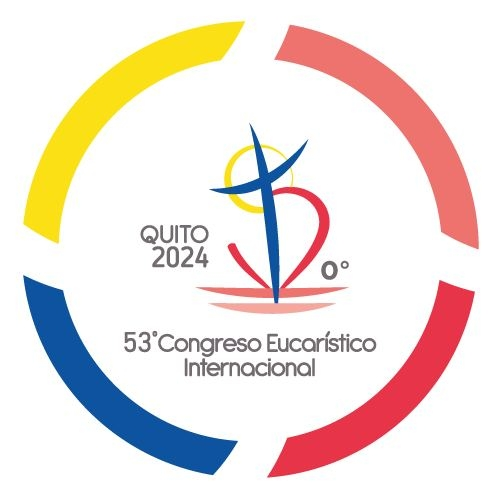
- The 53rd. International Eucharistic Logo
- English name: International Eucharistic Congress
- Date: September 8–15, 2024
- Venue: Centro de Convenciones Bicentenario
- Location: Quito, Ecuador
- Theme: Fraternidad para sanar el mundo". "Ustedes son todos hermanos" (Mt 23,8).
- Cause: An International Eucharistic Congress aims to make known, love and serve better Our Lord Jesus Christ in his Eucharistic Mystery, the center of life and the mission to heal the wounds of the world.
- Organised by: Roman Catholic Archdiocese of Quito; Ecuadorian Episcopal Conference; Pontifical Committee for International Eucharistic Congresses
- Website: www.iec2024.ec

The LIII International Eucharistic Congress 2024 was the Eucharistic congress that took place from September 8 to 15, 2024 in Quito, Ecuador.

Was the first time that the Ecuadorian capital hosts the ecumenical event and the sixth time that it takes place in the American continent, after the various congresses in some cities in the United States, Canada, Mexico, Argentina, Brazil and Colombia and after the held in the capital of Hungary, Budapest in 2021.

== Background ==
After the visit made by Pope Francis in 2015, during the period of the then president of Ecuador, Rafael Correa, the pope was enthusiastic about the warmth shown by the Andean country, for which in a meeting held in Rome, he determined that Quito is chosen for the ecumenical congress, to give greater projection to the Catholic religion in a region that has once again been divided in the religious sphere due to the constant sieges of leftist-leaning politicians that have left the region weak.

In one of the Masses held on Thursday, September 9, 2020, at the Eucharistic Congress in Hungary; The Archbishop of Quito, Alfredo José Espinoza Mateus, announced that Quito would host the event that coincides with the 150th anniversary of the Consecration of Ecuador to the Sacred Heart of Jesus.

== Venue ==
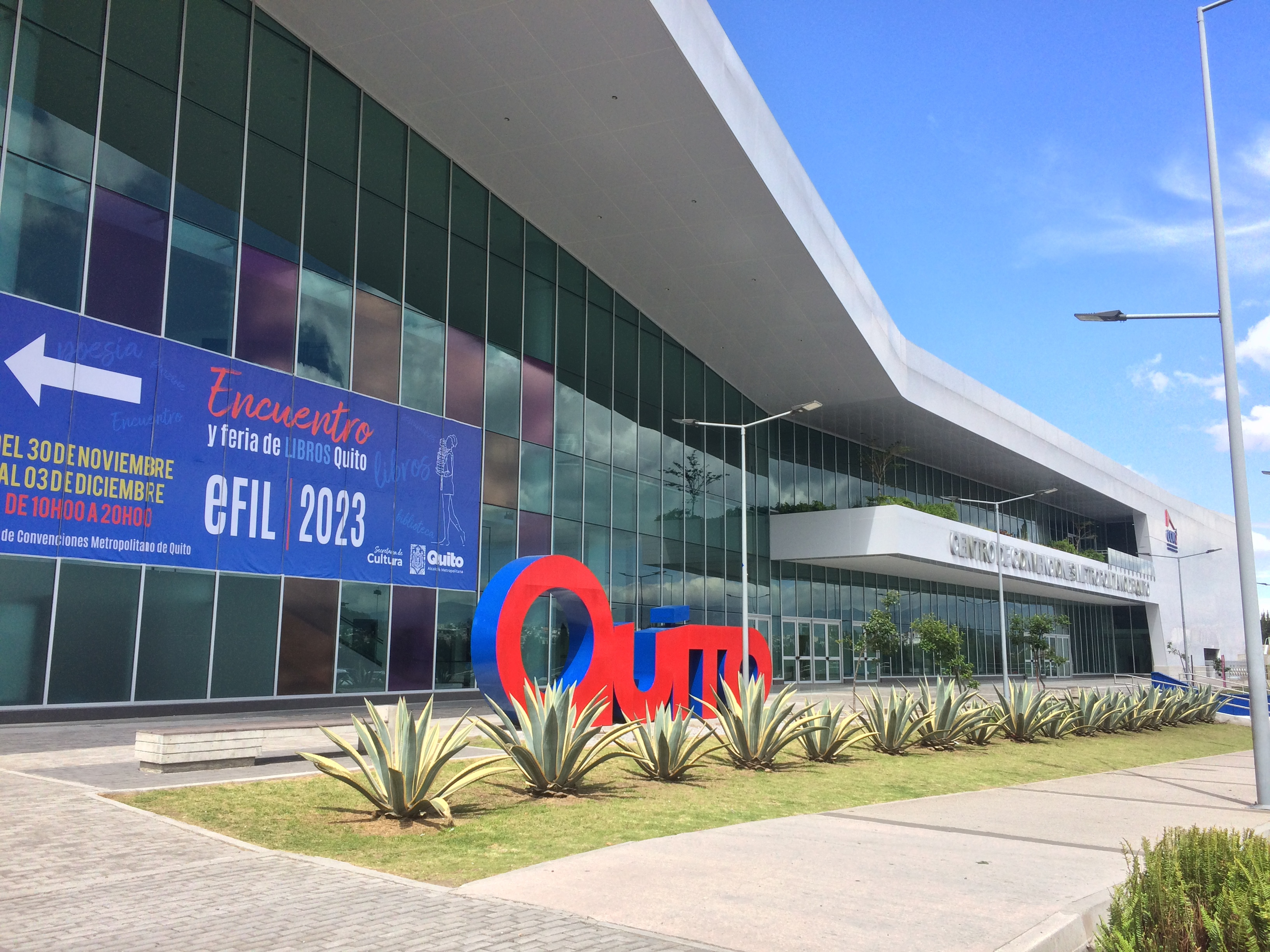
The Centro de Convenciones Bicentenario, was the place of the religious ecumenic event in September 2024

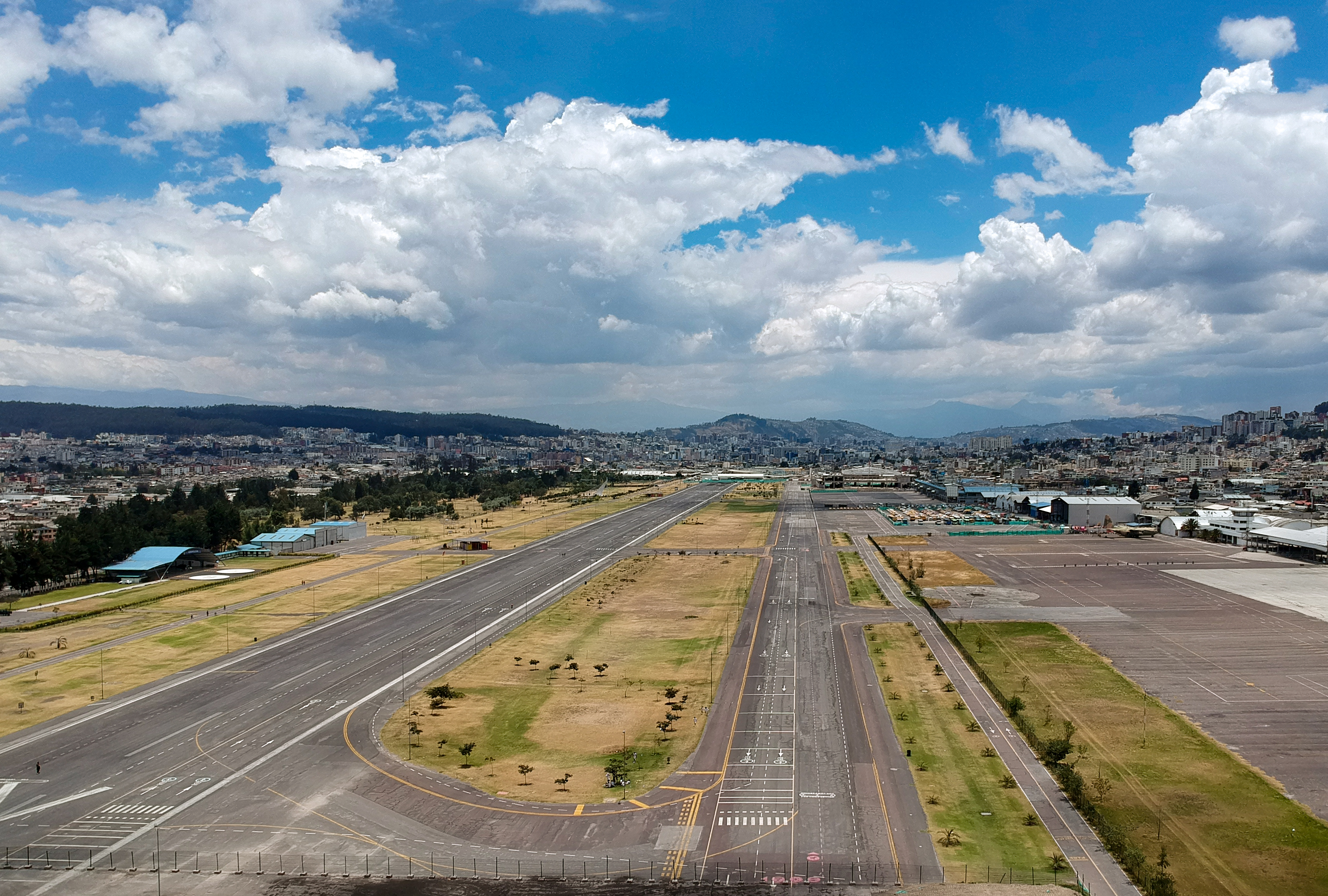
The Parque Bicentenario de Quito was also the place of the Opening and Closing Masses of the Congress

From September 8 to 15, 2024, the congress was held in the Centro de Convenciones Bicentenario. and the Parque Bicentenario de Quito was the place of the opening and closing Masses of the Congress.

== Symbols ==
=== Official logo and anthem ===
The official logo and the winning anthem used in the 53rd edition of the International Eucharistic Congress (IEC) held in Quito, were presented at the Ecuadorian Episcopal Conference (CEE) on May 10, 2023.

The author of the Congress logo was Publio Escobar. According to him, his creation represents “brotherhood to heal the world.”

For its part, the winning anthem was Around your table by composers Marco Antonio Espín and the musical religious group Solideo. These are Catholic artists dedicated to evangelizing through "new and unpublished contemporary music."

=== Official lyrics ===
Spanish original

Coro:
Fraternidad para sanar el mundo
eso nos muestras, Señor, desde la cruz.
/Tú nos congregas en torno a tu mesa
y nos enseñas al hermano a amar/.

I:
Con tu cuerpo y sangre, misterio divino,
te haces presente aquí en el altar.
/Tú estás con nosotros en el pan y el vino
que reconcilian, que dan vida y paz/.
II:
Señor amigo, Palabra de Dios,
tú nos invitas a ser fraternidad.
/Por ti aquí estamos y eres alimento
que nos llena de amor para sanar/.
III:
Fraternidad es más que una palabra,
es un abrazo olvidando el rencor,
/es dar la mano al pobre y desvalido,
es consolar al hermano en la aflicción/.
IV:
Tú nos enseñas a amar al más pequeño,
ustedes son todos hermanos, sean uno.
/Desde Ecuador, para el mundo entero,
anunciamos: Tú eres la vida, Jesús/.
Coro

English translation

Chorus:
Fraternity to heal the world
That is what you show us, Lord, from the cross.
/You gather us around your table
and you teach us brother to love/.

I
With your body and blood, divine mystery,
you make yourself present here at the altar.
/You are with us in the bread and wine
that reconcile, that give life and peace/.
II
Lord friend, Word of God,
you invite us to be fraternity.
/For you here we are and you are food
that fills us with love to heal/.
III
Fraternity is more than a word,
It is a hug forgetting the resentment,
/is to shake hands with the poor and helpless,
It is to console the brother in affliction/.
IV
You teach us to love the least,
You are all brothers, be one.
/From Ecuador, for the whole world,
we announce: You are the life, Jesus/.
Chorus

=== Gospel Book ===
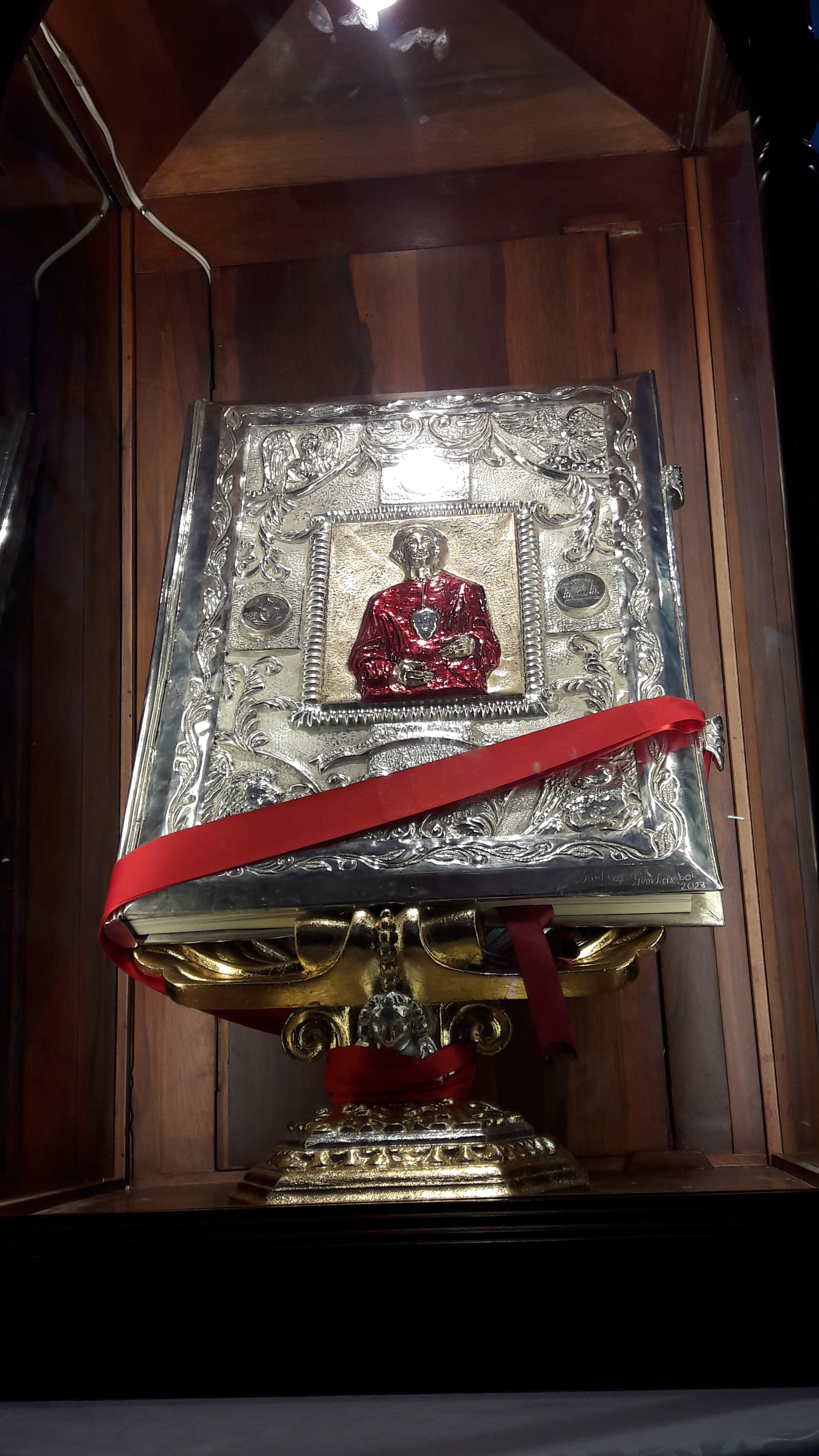
The IEC 2024 Gospel Book upon its arrival in the city of Azogues

The “Gospel,” symbol of the 53rd International Eucharistic Congress, blessed and signed by Pope Francis, toured Ecuador starting in September 2024. It is a liturgical book that contains the gospels for each Sunday of the year and solemn holidays.

It is an artistic work made by Santiago Guartambel, whose talent in goldsmithing has given a strong meaning to this unique piece. In this interview, the artist shares details about the creative process and the meanings behind his work.

The artist explains that his work consisted of representing the Sacred Heart of Jesus as an iconic symbol of Ecuador, the same one that is captured on the main cover of the Gospel. Elements that represent the cultural diversity of the country were incorporated, through ethnicities, such as:

On the front cover, the representation of the Heart of Jesus is gold-plated, and the mantle is fire-enameled. On the back cover there is a shuar symbolizing the East; an indigenous person representing the Sierra; an Afro-Ecuadorian, representing the Coast. In this composition, there is generally a baby, a young man and an old man at the same time.

The design used in its symbology: a cross, an open heart, a host and 0º (zero latitude), referring to Quito as the middle of the world.

== Broadcasting ==
=== Television and Internet ===
On May 21, 2024, the 53rd. International Eucharistic Congress was choicen to EWTN, as the official broadcaster for to be carried the ecumenical event broadcasts in all languages around the world, including audiovisual media and through social networks, as Facebook, X, Instagram and WhatsApp.

== Preparations ==
It was announced that, with this communication, the organizational and spiritual preparation of the next International Eucharistic Congress (IEC2024) begins, in which the National Delegates appointed by the Episcopal Conferences of the different countries also participate. Remembering that the International Eucharistic Congresses are not relics of the past that are difficult to integrate into today's world, but rather, much like the other great public events of the Church, they are committed to generating historical processes of growth of Christian communities around values that bear witness to the presence of God in the history of humanity and reflect more clearly the role of the Eucharist in ecclesial life and praxis.

Father Juan Carlos Garzón, general secretary of the International Eucharistic Congress of Quito 2024, pointed out that this event, which will take place from September 8 to 15 in that city, will be an opportunity to heal “a wounded Ecuador.”

Among those preparations for the ecumenical event, on May 20, 2024, Pope Francis appointed Cardinal Kevin Farrell as special envoy to the LIII International Eucharistic Congress and on August 24, 2024, the Cardinnal Baltazar Enrique Porras Cardozo was appointed by Pope Francis as the Pontifical Legate for the Internacional Eucharistic Congress to be held in Quito, Ecuador.

== Contingency Plan ==
In a meeting held on July 17, the details of logistics in mobilization, places of concentration of people, security, health and cleaning and the operations that were deployed for the successful development of the 53rd Eucharistic Congress held from the 4th to the 15th September 2024 were refined.

The meeting was chaired by Fernanda Racines, deputy mayor, and she learned about the logistical issue that the Archdiocese will move and the agreements that must be reached with the municipality and the operations that will be carried out with all municipal agencies.
