= Parque Bicentenario de Quito =

Park in Quito, Ecuador

Coordinates: 0°08′24″S 78°29′18″W

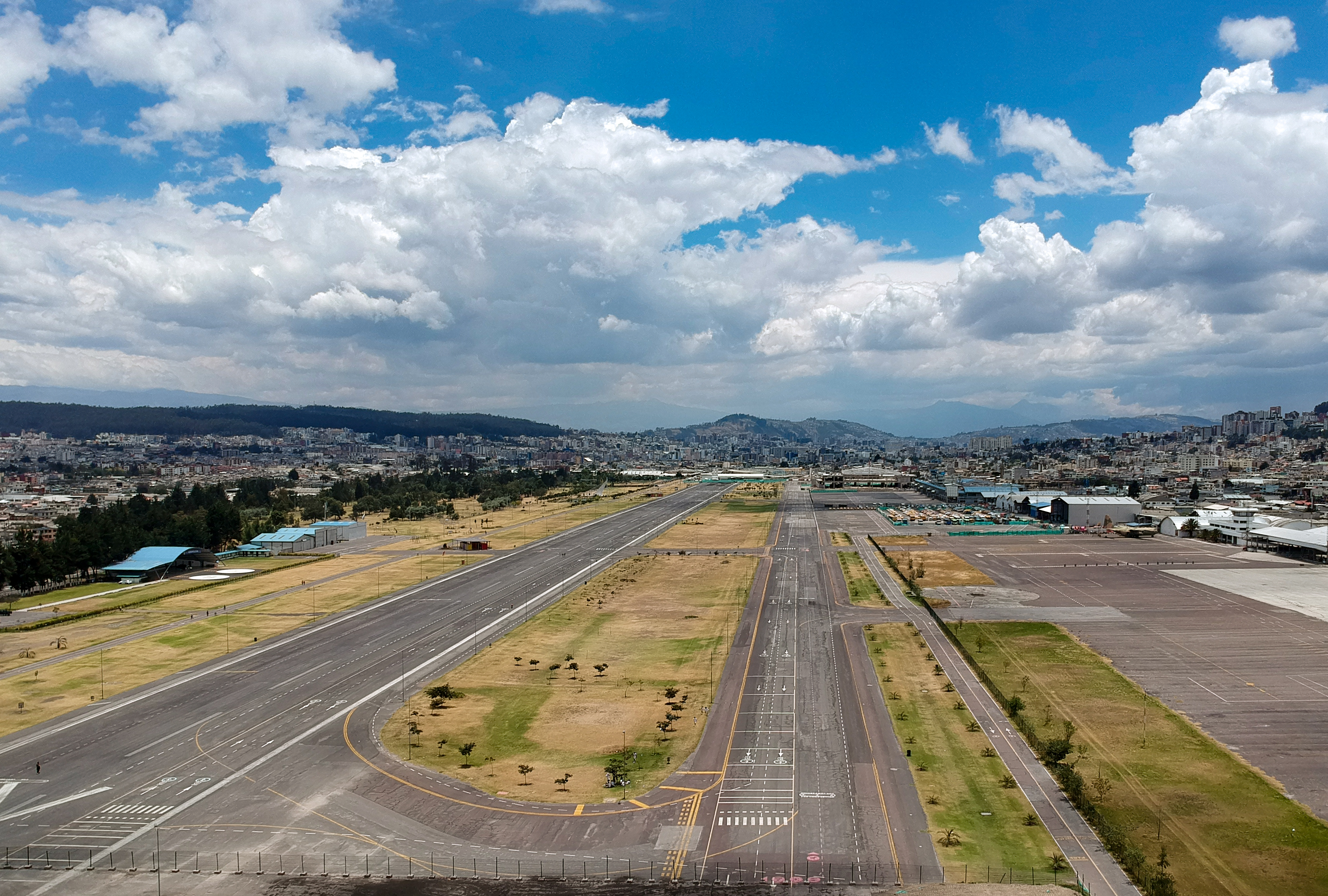
The Parque Bicentenario in Quito

The Bicentennial Park known also as Parque Bicentenario de Quito is a public green space in the city of Quito, capital of Ecuador. It is located in the north of the city, on the same land that belonged to the old airport of the city, flanked by Amazonas Avenue to the west, Galo Plaza and Real Audiencia to the east, and del Maestro to the north.

Jurisdictionally, the park is located in the urban parishes of La Concepción, Kennedy and Cotocollao, although most of it is within the first. With its 125 hectares, it constitutes the largest green area within the city, surpassing La Carolina Park, which had held that record until April 27, 2013, when Bicentennial was opened to the public for the first time.

== Name ==
After several years in which the project was called Parque del Lago, it was officially redefined as Bicentennial by the Metropolitan Council through ordinance C408, on July 11, 2012. This name responds to the commemoration of the 200 years of one of the most important chapters in the history of the city and the country: the First Cry of Independence.

The proposal aimed at preserving the historical memory of the Quito Revolution and the national independence cause, considering the capital as the manager of this process, connecting that memory with symbolic works. Thus, the name Bicentennial Park was proposed for the space occupied by the old airport, and to locate symbolic and representative spaces in it that allude to the process of independence of Ecuador, with particular emphasis on the revolution that took place in the city of Quito.

== History ==
=== Background ===
On January 17, 2013, the Metropolitan Council issued Ordinance 0352, which defined the use and occupation of the land of the future Bicentennial Park and its surroundings. The plan included complementary urban planning and landscaping standards (street furniture, equipment for services such as the Convention Center, vegetation) within the park, collective support systems (cross roads, parking lots, outdoor green areas, networks and public services), urban and land management strategies, restructuring of the surrounding lots for high-rise buildings, among others.

On January 30, 2013, Mayor Augusto Barrera announced that the facilities of Air Base No. 1 (6 hectares) would not be part of the park, as they would be maintained as administrative offices and the heliport of the Presidency of the Republic.

Since March 2013, a few weeks before its inauguration, eight stations with children's games and public gym equipment were placed at the north and south ends; becoming the first urban furniture of this new recreational area. 2,800 endemic trees of the area were also planted, a reflecting pool was built on the eastern side, temporary courts were laid out on the old landing strip, and paths were laid out for cycling, skating or walking. This was considered the first stage of consolidation of the park.

=== Opening ===
The park was inaugurated on the morning of Saturday, April 27, 2013, with the opening of the gates at the three entrances to the green area, which took place at 08:09 in the morning. The attendees, estimated at 10,000 in the first few hours alone, enjoyed fairs where they could learn about the work of the different municipal companies, photography exhibitions on the history and closure of the old airport, cycling competitions, social circus and outdoor gymnastics.

The opening day began with a caravan of athletes led by the then mayor of the city, Augusto Barrera, who entered the park after having toured the streets of the city from the emblematic Cruz del Papa in La Carolina Park; symbolically taking over a new recreation area for the citizens. At 4:30 p.m. an opening concert was held, in which the Núñez Brothers, the Papá Changó band and Juan Fernando Velasco participated.

During the first two days, the park received 299,544 people, far exceeding the visits that were recorded until then in other important green areas of the city such as La Carolina or the Gungüiltagua Metropolitan Park.

=== Future stages ===
According to Samuel Robalino, the first manager of the project, 89% of the park area will be green and will become a lung for the city, gradually removing the concrete from the ends towards the center, consolidating the entire park by 2030. In addition to creating forests, wetlands will be formed that house various species of wild fauna and flora. Temporary nurseries, permanent trees, ornamental gardens, walkways, courts, athletics track, children's games, temporary graphics, accesses and parking will be established in the park.

Regarding the access routes for vehicle traffic, the Amazonas and Real Audiencia avenues will be extended, in order to consolidate the perimeter road of the park. Priority will be given to the transversal connection of the city (east-west) by extending the Isaac Albéniz (inaugurated in December 2014), Florida, Fernández Salvador avenues and the complete opening of Luis Tufiño.

The Bicentennial Park is one of the strategic projects for the change of the urban structure of the city of Quito, turning it into a compact and polycentric city, physically and socially diverse, functional and environmentally sustainable. This also allows strengthening the District System of Centralities with facilities and services for recreation, sports, culture and citizen coexistence, as well as completing the District Network of Public Spaces and Green Areas and connectivity, with a high impact on the quality of life of the community, the landscape and urban ecosystems.

=== Vegetation ===
Until the end of 2013, the Bicentennial Park had several species of trees endemic to the Iñaquito valley area, including the Quito arrayan and the cholán, and other foreign species such as the alder, black acacia, white callístemo, cedar, walnut, pumamaqui and yalomán. At the beginning of 2014, new species were included in the central strip of the old track: arupo, white arupo, eugenia, guabo, coconut cumbi, phoenix palm, tropical ceiba, jacaranda and loquat.

== Infrastructure ==
At the moment, the park has mostly temporary infrastructure, while the planned and definitive infrastructure is being built.

== Events ==
The park has been venue of the massive multicultural events:

| Events | Date |
| Metallica musical concert | March 18, 2014 |
| The Amazing Race Ecuador | October 27, 2014 |
| I Festival of Quitonía | December 3, 2014 |
| Camp Mass by Pope Francis | July 7, 2015 |
| Cirque Du Soleil | November 18 – December 13, 2015 |
| Concierto Ecuador Aquí Estoy | May 15, 2016 |
| Metallica musical concert | October 29, 2016 |
| Amaluna (Cirque Du Soleil) | September 6–30, 2018 |
| 53rd International Eucharistic Congress | September 8–15, 2024 |
