= Centro de Convenciones Bicentenario =

Multi-purpose place in Quito, Ecuador

Coordinates: 0.14661°S 78.489098°W

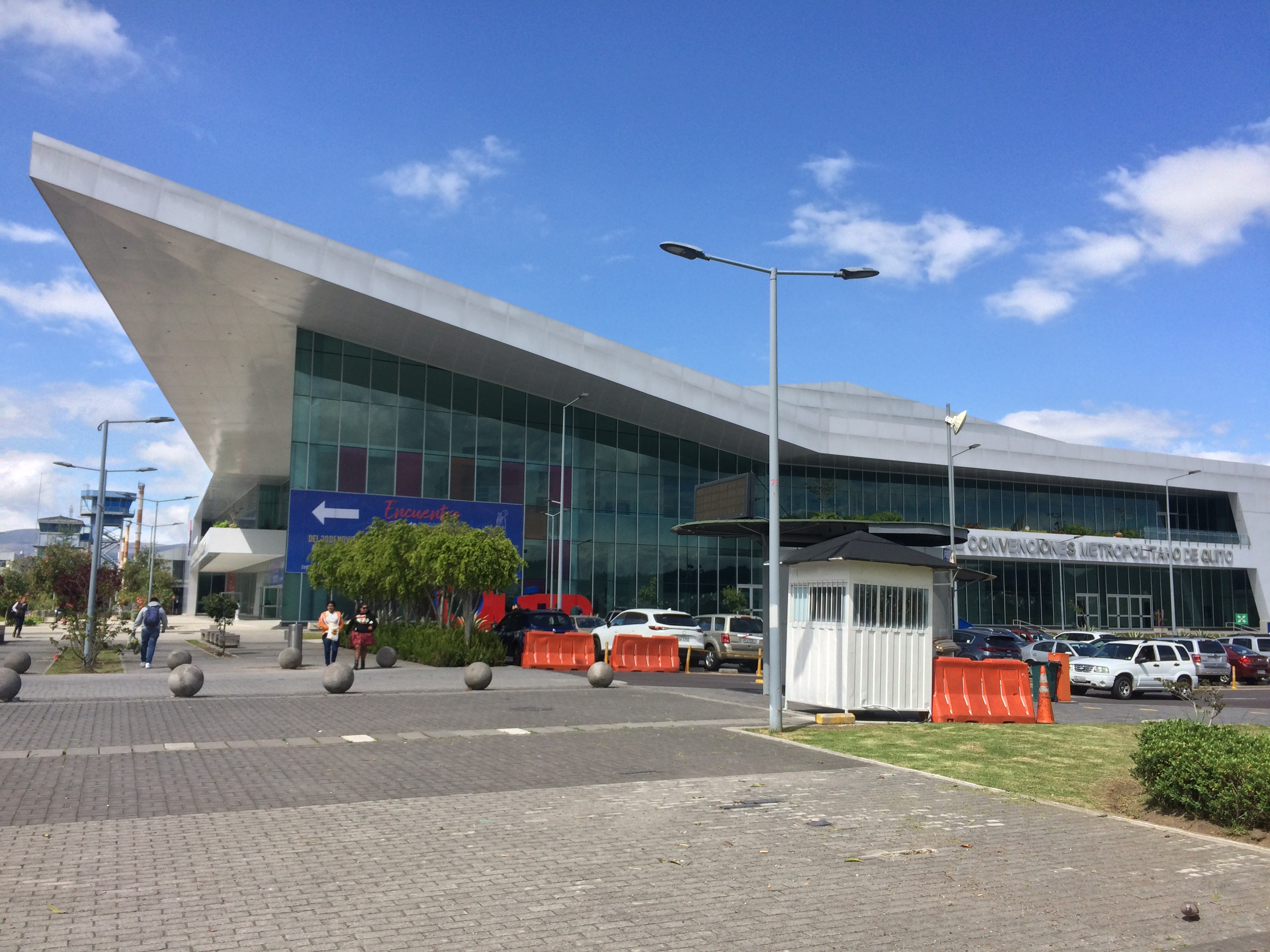

The Quito Metropolitan Convention Center (CCMQ), also known as the Bicentenario Convention Center, is a complex of municipally owned buildings that constitutes the main convention center of the city of Quito, Ecuador. The complex is located on the grounds of the terminal of the Old Mariscal Sucre Airport, surrounded by Bicentenario Park, in the parish of La Concepción, north of the Ecuadorian capital.

== Background ==
On July 13, 2015, the design chosen for the Convention Center building was presented, the cost of which would amount to US 15 million, covered and donated entirely by Aecon Group Inc as part of that company's legacy to the city. On October 30 of the same year, the first debate on the project was held in the Metropolitan Council of the city, resulting in its approval. On November 27, however, a second and definitive debate was held where The matter regarding land use was approved.

=== Construction and inauguration ===
The complex began construction in April 2017, and by October of the same year it was 45% complete. The Convention Center building was inaugurated on September 19, 2018, with the Expoflor Ecuador event, in the 126 exhibitors participated, including 86 producing farms and thirteen breeders, exhibiting almost 600 types of flowers including roses, hydrangeas and orchids.

== Project ==
The project was built in an area of 11.4 ha and will be managed by the companies Aecon Group Inc and ADC, main shareholders of Quiport, the organization that manages the Mariscal Sucre International Airport in Tababela. It has a convention center 16,400 m^{2}, with capacity for more than 10,000 people in different rooms, the largest of which is designed for an audience of 4,000 people, and aims for the Ecuadorian capital to become an important international venue for congresses and conventions.

In addition, in the future the project will have a fairground, offices, catering, warehouses and complementary areas such as a media library, specialized movie theaters, an interactive cultural center, two hotel towers, a business center, shops and restaurants, a performance arena, parking lots, botanical garden and green areas. The recovery of the original tower and terminal of the Old Mariscal Sucre International Airport is also planned.

== Events ==
On September 8 to 15, 2024, will be The 53rd International Eucharistic Congress will take place, in these place.
