= San Giuliano Martire =

- Church of Saint Julian Martyr
- Chiesa di San Giuliano Martire
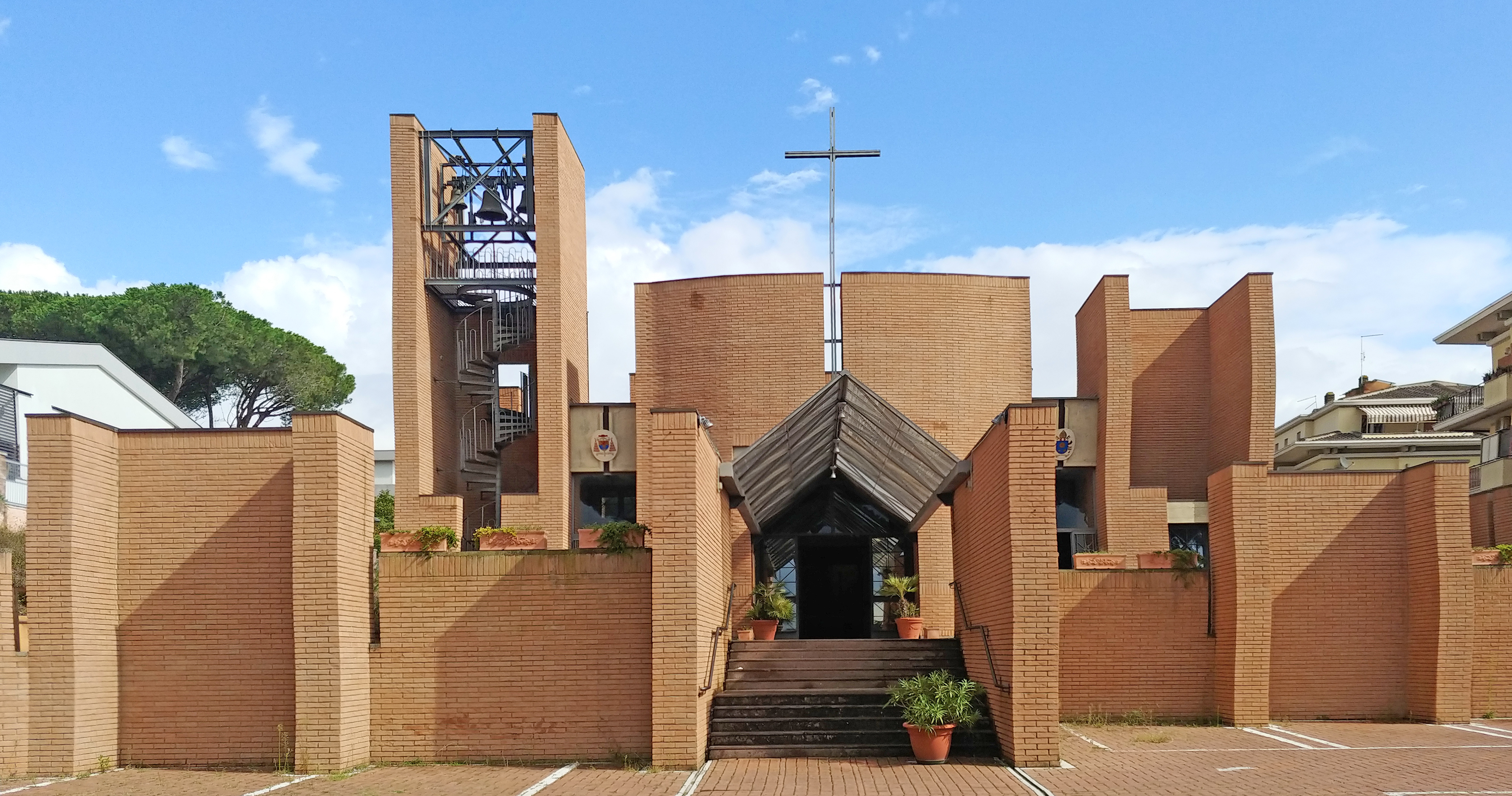

- Location within Rome
- 41°58′30″N 12°25′40″E
- Location: Via Cassia 1036, Zona Tomba di Nerone, Rome
- Country: Italy
- Language: Italian
- Denomination: Catholic
- Tradition: Roman Rite
- Website: parrocchiasangiulianoroma.it

History
- Status: titular church, parish church
- Dedication: Julian of Antioch (Julian Martyr)
- Consecrated: 18 November 1995

Architecture
- Functional status: active
- Architect: Igino Pineschi
- Architectural type: Modern
- Groundbreaking: 1993
- Completed: 1995

Administration
- Diocese: Rome

San Giuliano Martire is a 20th-century parochial church and titular church in northern Rome, dedicated to Saint Julian of Antioch (d. AD 305–311).

== History ==
San Giuliano Martire was built in 1993–95. It is made with concrete and red brick, floored in white marble and built on a basilica plan. Pope John Paul II visited in 1997.

On 18 February 2012, it was made a titular church to be held by a cardinal-deacon.

Cardinal-Protectors

- Karl Josef Becker (2012–2015)
- Kevin Farrell (2016–present)
