= Kevin Crowley (friar) =

Irish friar (1935–2025)

Kevin Crowley O.F.M. Cap. (24 February 1935 – 2 July 2025), known as Brother Kevin, was an Irish Capuchin friar.

== Biography ==
Born in Enniskeane, County Cork, Crowley was educated at Kilcolman National school and Bandon Vocational School. He worked initially as a signalman with CIÉ but joined the Capuchin Franciscan Order in Kilkenny in 1958, finishing his novitiate in Rochestown, and taking final orders in 1963.

Stationed in Dublin and working in a Capuchin initiative which provided clothing for the unemployed and people with disabilities, Crowley founded the Capuchin Day Centre in 1969. This centre initially provided soup and bread to the city's homeless and unemployed, before expanding to provide other hot meals, clothing, showers and medical services.

Crowley received the Freedom of the City of Dublin in February 2015. He met with Pope Francis when he visited the Capuchin Day Centre during his visit to Ireland in August 2018. Crowley retired in August 2022.

Crowley died on 2 July 2025, at the age of 90.
