= 2018 visit by Pope Francis to Ireland =

2018 Papal Visit

Pope Francis' visit to Ireland
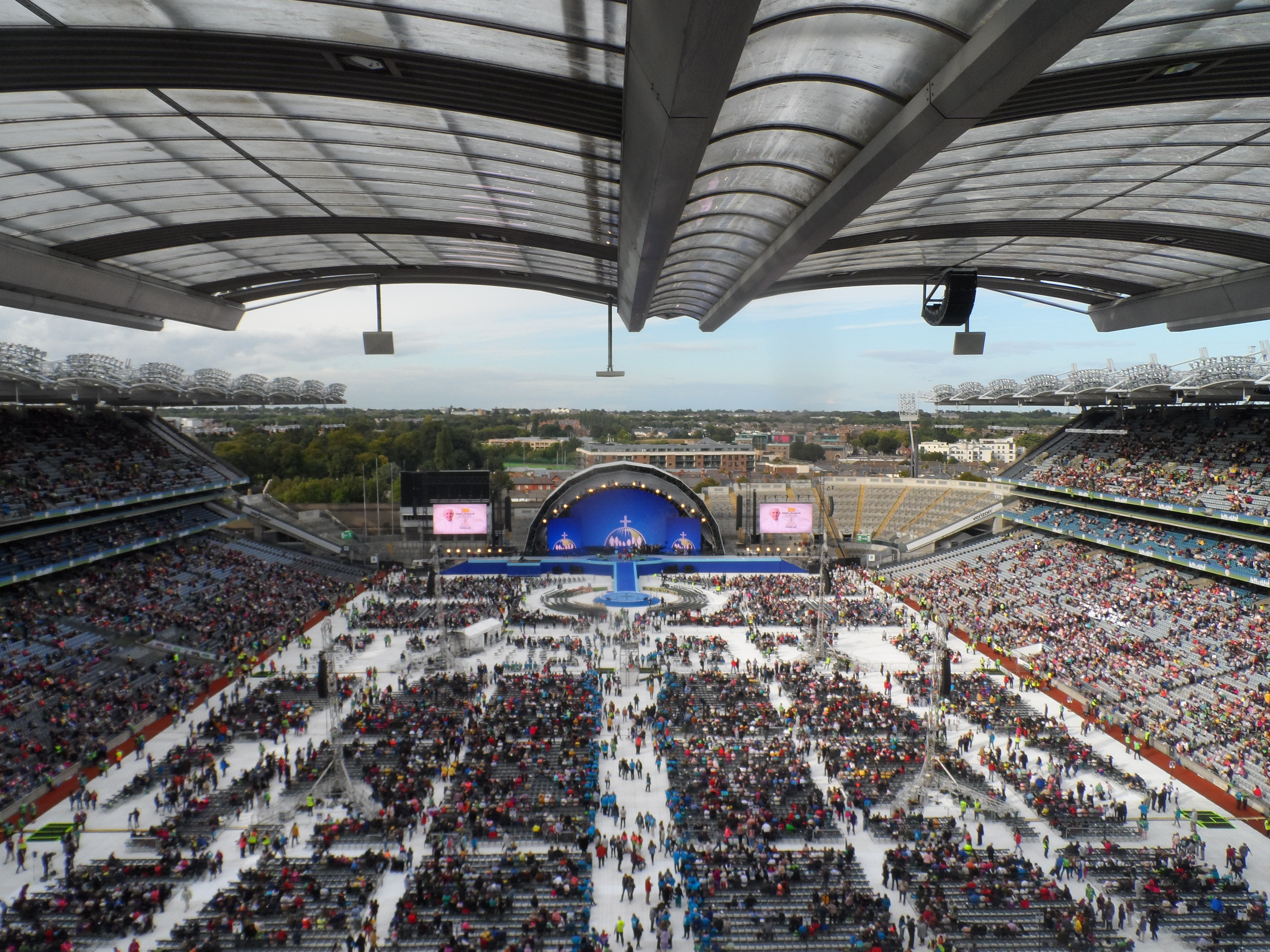
- Concert at Croke Park
- Date: 25–26 August 2018
- Venue: Áras an Uachtaráin, Dublin Castle, St Mary's Pro-Cathedral, Capuchin Day Centre for Homeless People, Croke Park, Knock Shrine, Phoenix Park
- Location: Dublin, Ireland
- Cause: World Meeting of Families 2018
- Organised by: Archdiocese of Dublin & the Government of Ireland
- Website: Government website

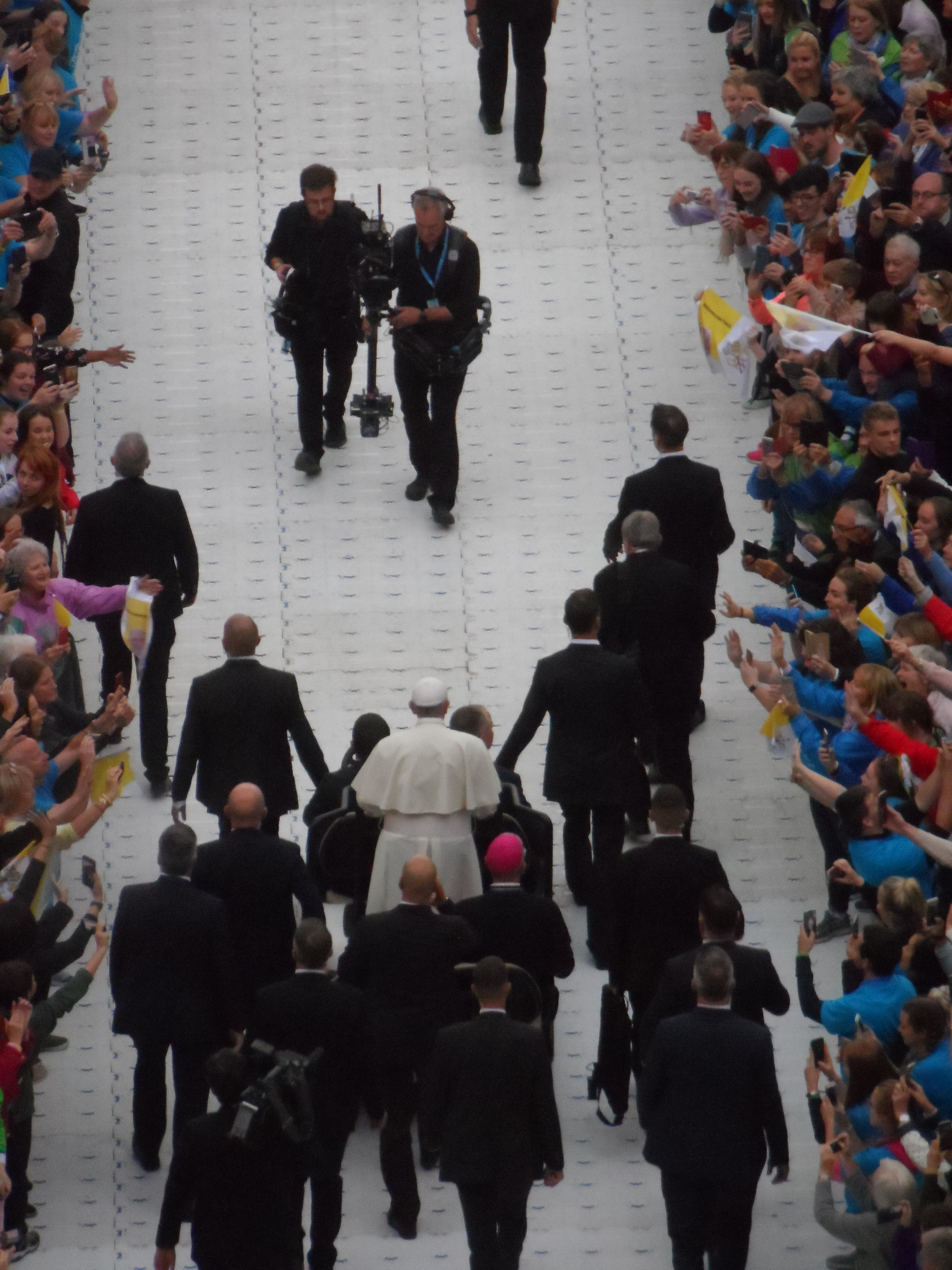
Pope Francis surrounded by bodyguards, Croke Park, 25 August

Pope Francis visited Ireland on 25 and 26 August 2018, as part of the World Meeting of Families 2018. It was the first visit by a reigning pontiff to the country since 1979 (though Francis had spent time studying English in Dublin in 1980, as Fr Jorge Bergoglio).

== Preparations ==
Speculation that Pope Francis would visit Ireland began immediately upon the announcement on 27 September 2015 that the World Meeting of Families 2018 would be held in Dublin.

Pope Francis confirmed he would be visiting Ireland on 21 March 2018, at the weekly general audience in St. Peter's Square. Roman Catholic Primate of All Ireland Archbishop Eamon Martin and Archbishop of Dublin Diarmuid Martin announced the visit's schedule in Maynooth on the morning of 11 June 2018. The Government of Ireland also launched an official website for the papal visit on that date.

== Itinerary ==
=== Day 1: 25 August, Saturday ===
Pope Francis was greeted by Tánaiste and Foreign Affairs and Trade Minister Simon Coveney and his family. He then travelled in a Škoda Rapid (his preferred mode of transport for the visit to Dublin), to Áras an Uachtaráin, where he met with President Michael D. Higgins, his wife Sabina Higgins, government minister Katherine Zappone, Ambassador of Ireland to the Holy See Emma Madigan, the Archbishop Eamon Martin, Archbishop of Dublin Diarmuid Martin, the Secretary of State of the Vatican Cardinal Pietro Parolin, and Syrian asylum seekers, amongst others.

The Pope signed the visitors' book with the following message: "With gratitude for the warm welcome I have received. I assure you and the people of Ireland of my prayers that almighty God may guide and protect you all. Francis". Pope Francis then planted a tree in the President's back garden.

Later, he met Taoiseach Leo Varadkar, and the two had a ten-minute private meeting.

Dignitaries present at Dublin Castle included former Taoisigh John Bruton, Bertie Ahern and Brian Cowen, former President Mary McAleese, Simon Coveney, Fianna Fáil leader Micheál Martin, Labour Party leader Brendan Howlin, Green Party leader Eamon Ryan, Minister for Health Simon Harris, Minister for Culture Josepha Madigan, Catherine Byrne, Richard Bruton, Senator David Norris, representatives from the Ulster Unionist Party and the Alliance Party of Northern Ireland, Charles McMullen (leader of the Presbyterian Church in Ireland), disability rights activist Joanne O'Riordan, Colm O'Gorman and Marie Collins, amongst others.

Varadkar's speech referred to what he called "the failures of both church and state" to deal with the sexual abuse scandal, as well as church involvement in the Magdalene Laundries, mother and baby homes and illegal adoptions (currently being investigated under the Mother and Baby Homes Commission of Investigation), which were "stains on our state, our society and also the Catholic church. People kept in dark corners behind closed doors, cries for help that went unheard." He went on to tell the Pope that modern Ireland needed a new covenant for the 21st century to learn from "our shared mistakes". Varadkar also noted far-reaching Irish social changes since the previous 1979 papal visit. He said Ireland was more diverse, less religious with modernised laws on divorce, contraception, abortion and same sex marriage "understanding that marriages do not always work, that women should make their own decisions, and that families come in many different, wonderful forms, including those headed by a grandparent, lone parent or same-sex parents, or parents who are divorced".

Francis' speech, delivered in Italian, condemned the long history of sex abuse by Catholic clergy in Ireland and acknowledged the church's lack of action on child sexual abuse, calling it a "grave scandal", but did not address victims' demands for more action to be taken. He praised the 20 years of peace in Ireland which stemmed from the Good Friday Agreement.

Democratic Unionist Party leader Arlene Foster turned down an invitation from the Government of Ireland to attend the Dublin Castle event, saying she would be abroad with her family at the time; she later noted the irony in criticism of her reason given.

Later, the pope held a silent prayer at the Candle of Innocence, which was dedicated in 2011 to honour victims of sex abuse, in St Mary's Pro-Cathedral in Dublin city centre. He then visited Brother Kevin at the Capuchin Day Centre for Homeless People.

Crowds in Dublin were reported by BBC News to be one person deep. The first day of the Pope's visit concluded with a crowd of an estimated 82,500 attending the Festival of Families at Croke Park where various entertainers performed.

=== Day 2: 26 August, Sunday ===
On the second day of the visit, Pope Francis was flown to Ireland West Airport in County Mayo and visited Knock Shrine.

Traffic tailbacks of up to eight kilometres around the local area and reports of traffic congestion as early as 5:30am were reported. The Pope addressed approximately 45,000 pilgrims who visited the shrine and held a prayer service inside the shrine's chapel, where he prayed and sought forgiveness for the sex abuse scandals. After signing a Mayo GAA jersey (to be put on display at the airport), he returned to Dublin.

He celebrated Mass at the Papal Cross in Phoenix Park. In the weeks leading up to the Phoenix Park service it was said that 500,000 would attend; Approximately 152,000 attended the service, according to the Office of Public Works. Before returning to Rome, Francis again met with Varadkar, who welcomed the Pope's call for action and forgiveness on clerical sex abuse, but said that Francis had to act on his words.

== Press conference ==
During the press conference on his flight back from Dublin to Rome, and following the launch of the Equal Future 2018 campaign against damage to children and young people from LGBT stigma four days earlier, Francis was asked what he would say to the father of a son who says he is gay. In his reply, the Pope said "Don't condemn. Dialogue, understand, make space for your son or daughter. Make space so they can express themselves," "You are my son, you are my daughter, just as you are!" and "that son and that daughter have the right to a family and of not being chased out of the family."

== Controversies ==
Before the Pope's arrival there were concerns over disruption due to widespread road closures required, the estimated cost of €32 million of the visit, protests on the history of physical and sexual abuse in Catholic institutions, and the Catholic Church's opposition to same-sex marriage, abortion and contraception, with former President Mary McAleese describing it as a "right-wing rally".

Coinciding with the Mass on Sunday, around 1,000 people assembled at Tuam's Town Hall in the West of Ireland and walked in silent vigil the 30-minute route to the Bon Secours Mother and Baby Home in remembrance of those who died or disappeared there. Meanwhile, at the Garden of Remembrance in Dublin at the same time, several thousand others were present for "Stand4Truth", held in solidarity with those who had been abused. Some called it a protest, others a space for anyone who felt excluded. It was organised by Colm O'Gorman, head of Amnesty International Ireland, himself a victim of sexual abuse by a priest. There were speeches, and music and then a silent walk to the site of the last Magdalen laundry to close in Ireland, on Sean McDermott Street, asking that it be preserved as a site of conscience, of memory and education, as well as an online petition organised on Uplift.

== Viganò's call for resignation ==
During, but otherwise unconnected with, the papal visit Archbishop Carlo Maria Viganò, a former top Vatican diplomat in the United States and staunch conservative critic of Pope Francis, published a letter calling on Francis to resign, claiming that he was made aware in 2013 of abuse allegations in the US against prominent US Cardinal Theodore McCarrick, but took no action. Viganò said that Pope Benedict XVI had been aware of the abuse allegations and had placed restrictions on McCarrick's movement and public ministry from 2009, and that Pope Francis had lifted these restrictions. However, the New York Times questioned Viganò's allegations. It was pointed out that Pope Benedict XVI did not continue to place restrictions on McCarrick by the year 2012 as Viganò alleged, and that he continued publicly celebrating Mass. One high-profile appearance for McCarrick that year was at Pope Benedict's birthday celebration, where he joined with other bishops to present a birthday cake to the Pope. The Catholic magazine America listed several other public appearances McCarrick made during this time. America listed several reasons the letter seemed credible, including Viganò's inside role in these matters as well as Pope Francis's "lack of progress" and "lack of urgency" regarding sexual abuse, but also listed several reasons to be skeptical about the letter, including Viganò's "perceived hostility toward Pope Francis" for having removed him from his post in 2016, allegedly because Viganò was seen as having "become too enmeshed in U.S. culture wars, particularly regarding same-sex marriage." Viganò also tried to quash the inquiry during Francis's papacy which led to the resignation of John Nienstedt as Archbishop of Saint Paul and Minneapolis.

== Commemorative items ==
An official commemorative medal marking the visit was released. The Dublin Mint Office (a private souvenir producer) also released a Celebration medal to mark the Pope's visit. The "Lollipope" – a lemon flavoured lolly complete with a picture of the Pope's face - was selling well ahead of the visit. Specially commissioned stamps, Pope Francis fridge magnets, candles and keyrings were also available, as well as many t-shirts, hats and flags.

Due to public safety notices warning of standing times of up to eight hours at Phoenix Park, practical event memorabilia emerged, including a fully recyclable, flat-pack corrugated cardboard portable chair featuring an image of the Pope.

== Venues ==
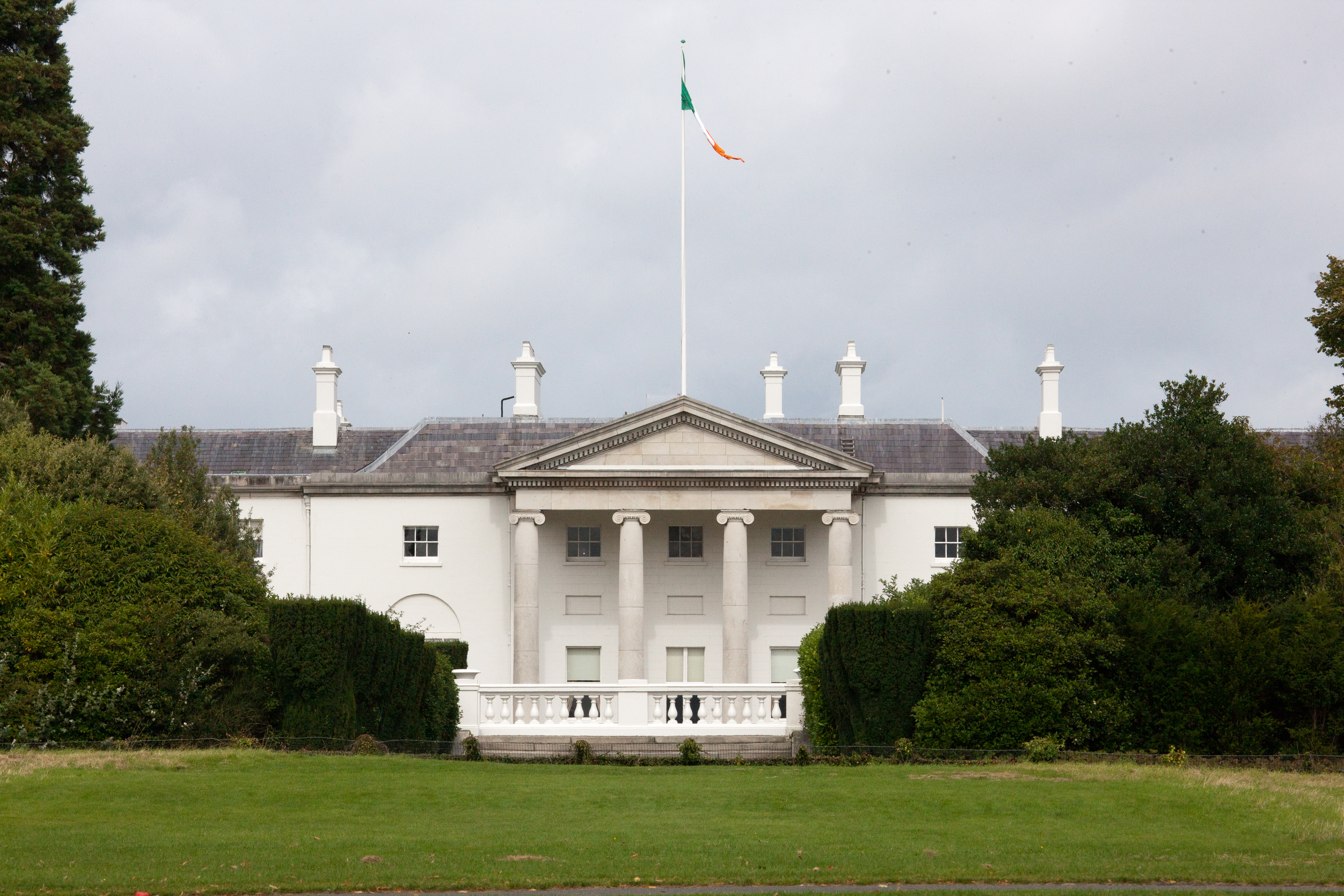
Áras an Uachtaráin

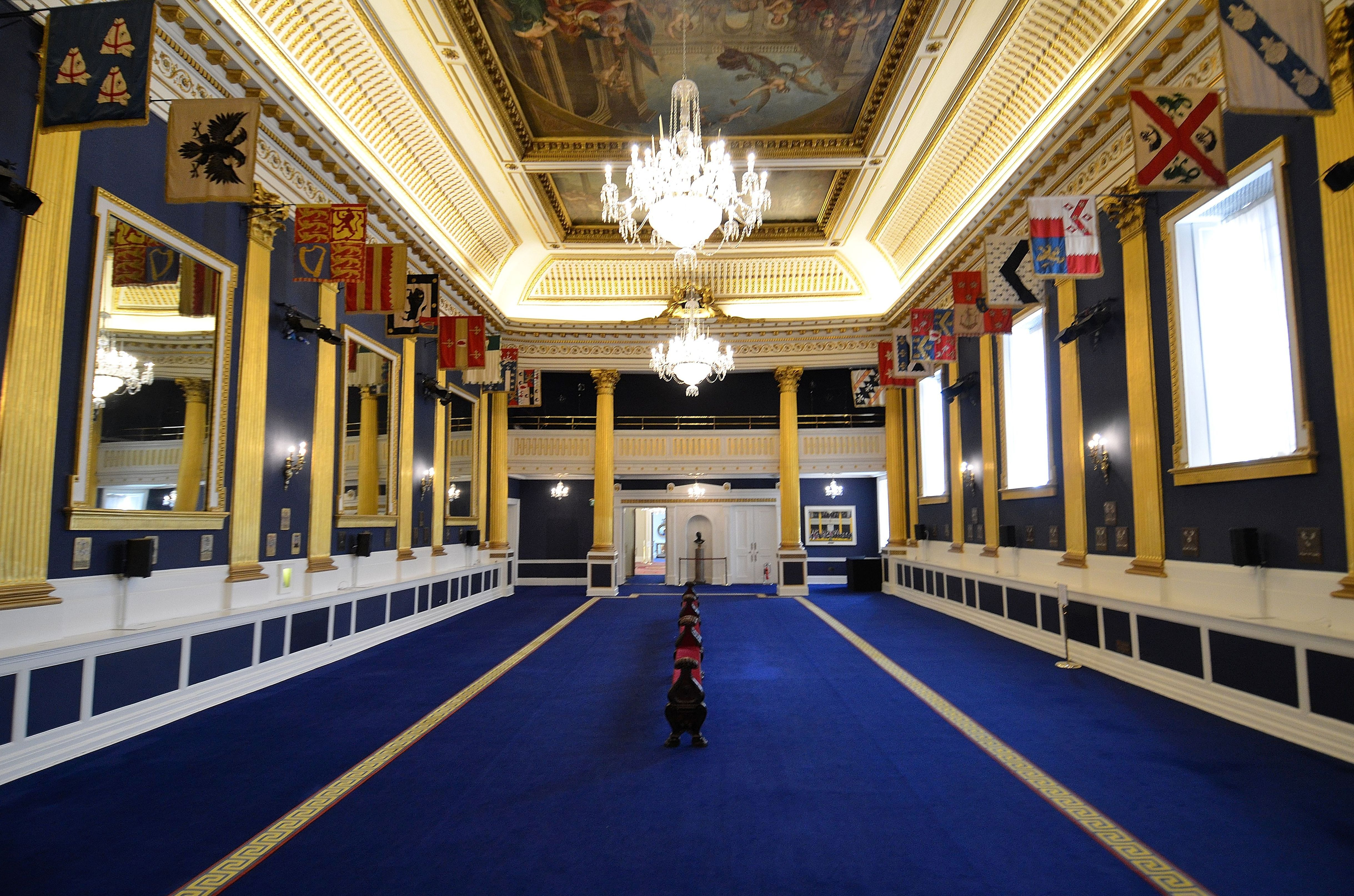
St Patrick's Hall
in
Dublin Castle

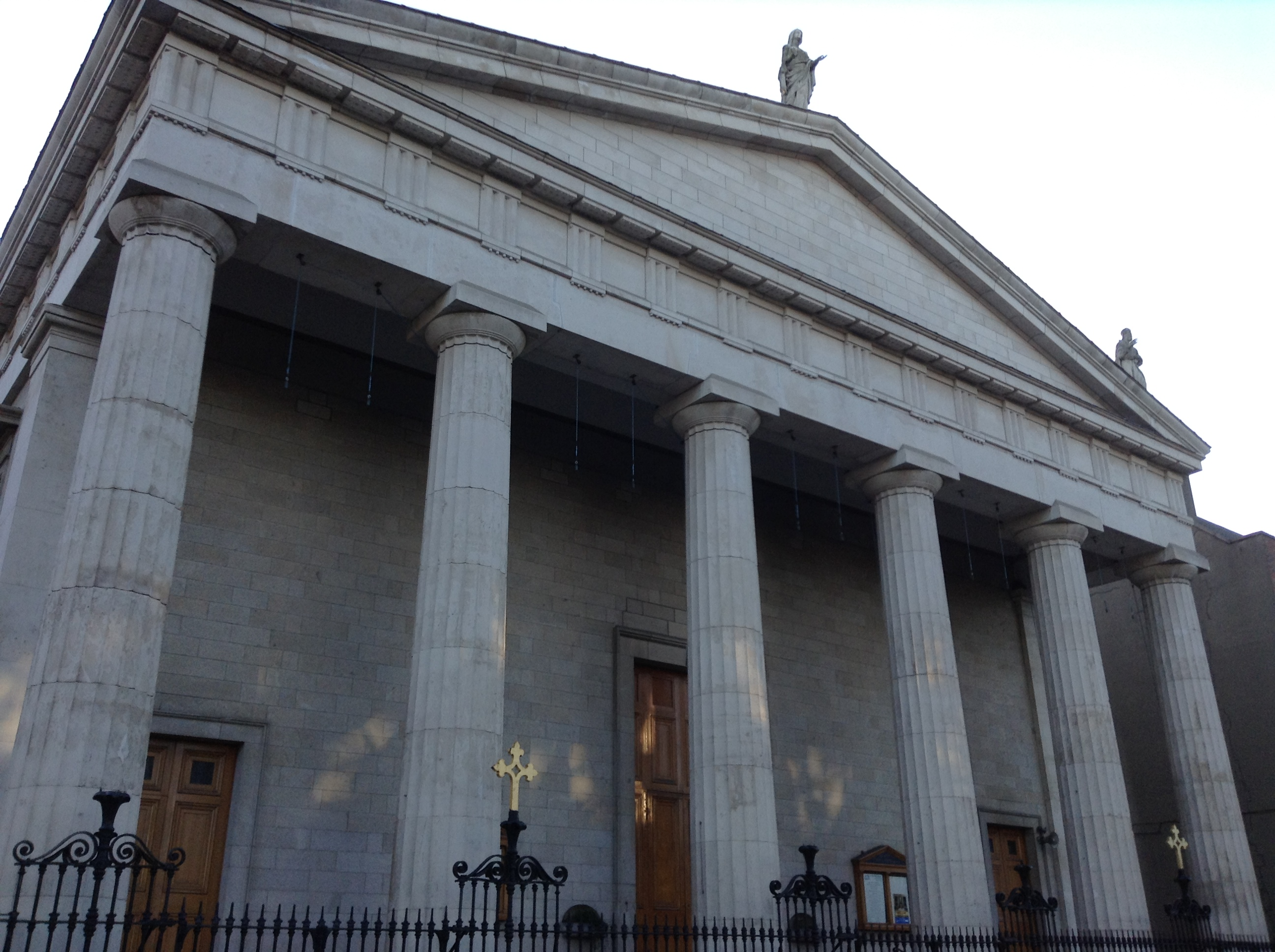
St Mary's Pro-Cathedral

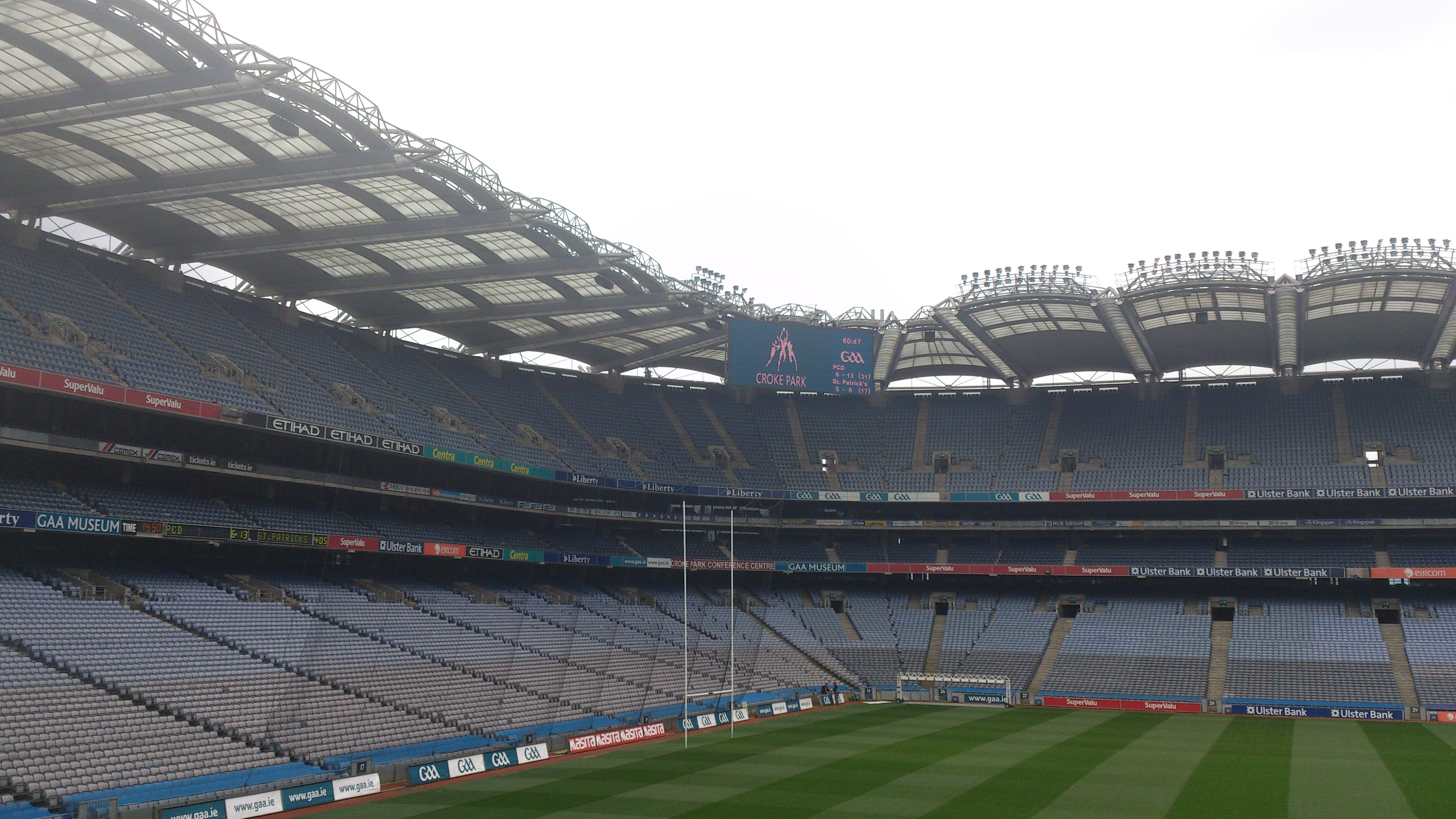
Croke Park

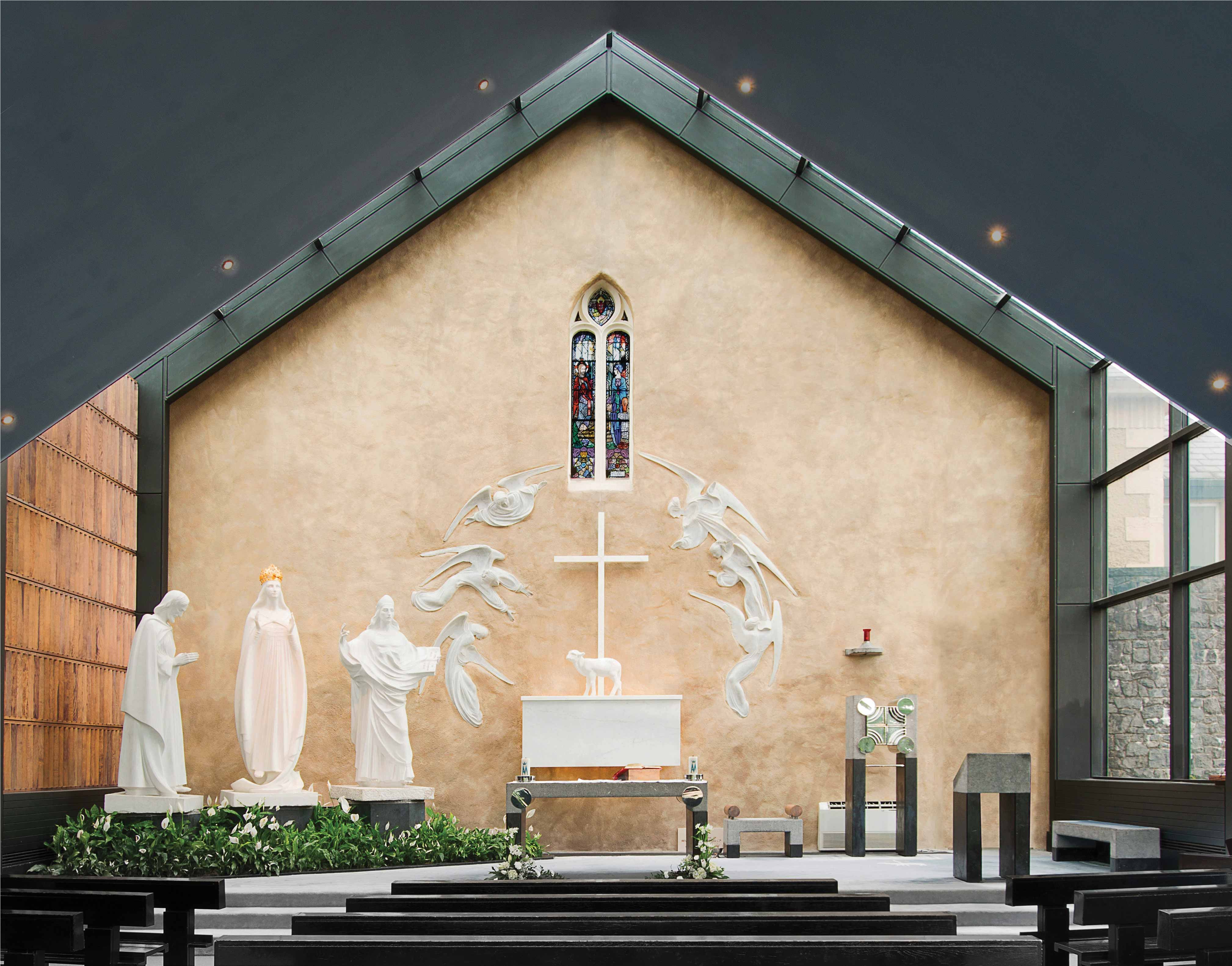
Knock Shrine

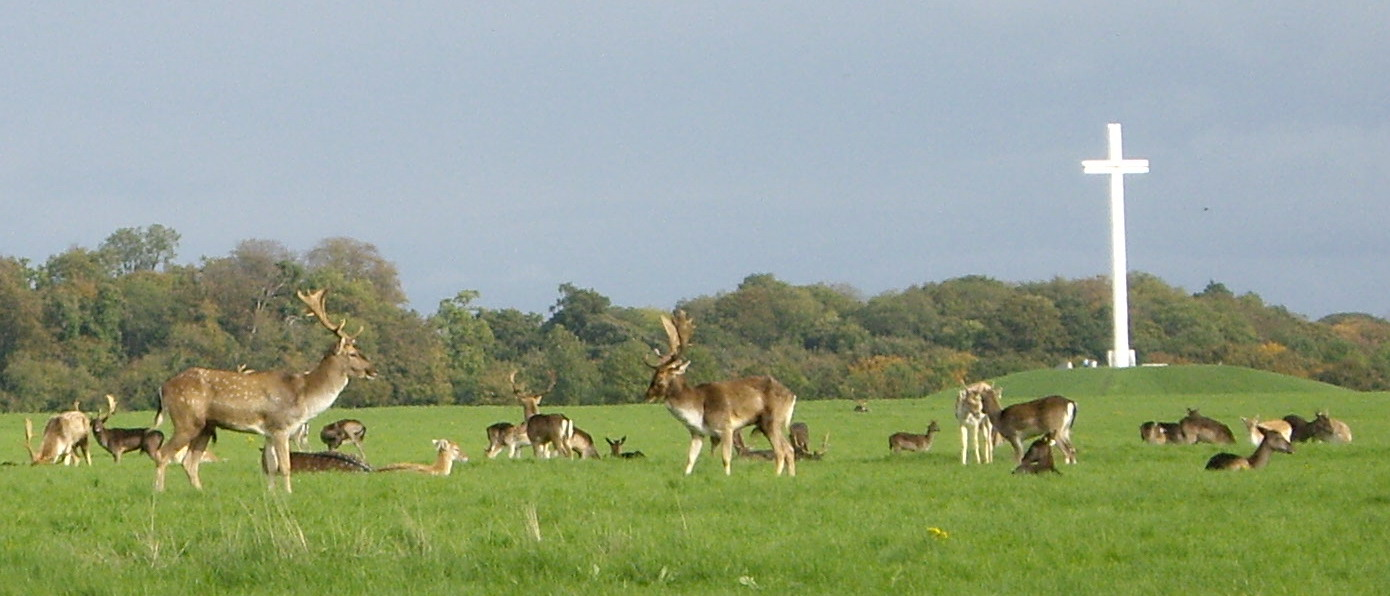
Phoenix Park

== See also ==
- Catholic Church in Ireland
