= Catholic Church and same-sex marriage =

Catholic Church's stance on same-sex marriage

The Catholic Church has intervened in political discourses to enact legislative and constitutional provisions establishing marriage as the union of a man and a woman, resisting efforts by civil governments to establish same-sex marriage.

Pope Francis has shown compassion towards same-sex attracted people, saying that "If a homosexual couple wants to lead a life together, the State has the possibility to give them safety, stability, inheritance; and not only to homosexuals but to all the people who want to live together. But marriage is a sacrament, between a man and a woman". While the Catholic Church explicitly denies its blessing for marital union between two people of the same sex, the Catechism of the Catholic Church goes into great detail when describing the legitimacy of individuals who identify as gay as beloved children of God.

On 18 December 2023, blessings of two individuals with same-sex attraction in document Fiducia supplicans were approved by Pope Francis and published by the Dicastery for the Doctrine of the Faith.

== Church teaching ==
On 3 June 2003, the Congregation for the Doctrine of the Faith published "Considerations Regarding Proposals to Give Legal Recognition to Unions Between Homosexual Persons" opposing same-sex marriage. This document made clear that "legal recognition of homosexual unions or placing them on the same level as marriage would mean not only the approval of deviant behaviour... but would also obscure basic values which belong to the common inheritance of humanity."

Catholic legislators were instructed that supporting such recognition would be "gravely immoral", and that they must do all they could to actively oppose it, bearing in mind that "the approval or legalisation of evil is something far different from the toleration of evil". The document said that allowing children to be adopted by people living in homosexual union would actually mean doing violence to them, and stated: "There are absolutely no grounds for considering homosexual unions to be in any way similar or even remotely analogous to God's plan for marriage and family. Marriage is holy, while homosexual acts go against the natural moral law."

In October 2015, bishops attending the Fourteenth Ordinary General Assembly of the Synod of Bishops in Rome agreed on a final document which reiterated that while homosexuals should not be discriminated against unjustly, the Church was clear that same-sex marriage is "not even remotely analogous" to heterosexual marriage. They also argued that local churches should not face pressure to recognise or support legislation that introduces same-sex marriage, nor should international bodies put conditions on financial aid to developing countries to force the introduction of laws that establish same-sex marriage.

== North America ==
=== Canada ===
In July 2003, the hierarchy of the Catholic Church in Canada, the country's plurality religion, protested the Chrétien government's plans to include same-sex couples in civil marriage. The church criticisms were accompanied by Vatican claims that Catholic politicians should vote according to their personal beliefs rather than the policy of the government. In late 2004, Frederick Henry, Bishop of Calgary, wrote a pastoral letter saying "Since homosexuality, adultery, prostitution and pornography undermine the foundations of the family, the basis of society, then the State must use its coercive power to proscribe or curtail them in the interests of the common good."

=== United States ===
In the United States, the leadership of the Catholic Church has taken an active and financial role in political campaigns across all states regarding same-sex marriage. Human Rights Campaign said that the church spent nearly $2 million in 2012 toward unsuccessful campaigns against gay marriage in four states, as the second-largest donor representing a significant share of the contributions used to fund anti-gay marriage campaigns. A 2012 Pew Research Center poll indicated that Catholics in the United States who generally support gay marriage outnumber those who oppose it at 52 percent to 37 percent.

In 2004, George Hugh Niederauer, as Bishop of Salt Lake City, who opposed same-sex marriage, spoke against a proposal to include a ban against it in the Utah state constitution, saying that prohibition by law was sufficient. But in 2008, as Archbishop of San Francisco, he campaigned in favor of California's Proposition 8, a ballot measure to constitutionally recognize heterosexual marriage as the only valid marriage within California. Campaign finance records show he personally gave at least $6,000 to back the voter-approved ban and was instrumental in raising $1.5 million to put the proposition on the ballot. Subsequently, he called for an amendment to the US Constitution as "the only remedy in law against judicial activism" following the striking down of a number of state same-sex marriage bans by federal judges. In 2012, Catholic bishops in Washington state issued pastoral statements and DVDs articulating the Catholic vision of marriage and urging parishioners to support efforts to define marriage as a union of one man and one woman in Referendum 74.

In 2010, the United States Conference of Catholic Bishops (USCCB) clarified the criteria for the funding of community development programs by the Catholic Campaign for Human Development. One criterion was exclusion of organizations advancing activities that run counter to Catholic teaching, examples of which included those that support or promote same-sex marriage. In 2016, the President of the national bishops' conference denounced US Vice President Joe Biden for officiating at the wedding of a same-sex couple, arguing that Catholic politicians should only do what is expressly in line with Catholic Church teaching.

Thomas Paprocki, Bishop of Springfield, Illinois, and Bishop Robert Morlino of Madison, Wisconsin, have instructed priests not to allow church funerals for those in same-sex marriages or unions to avoid giving the appearance that the Church approved of such unions.

== Europe ==
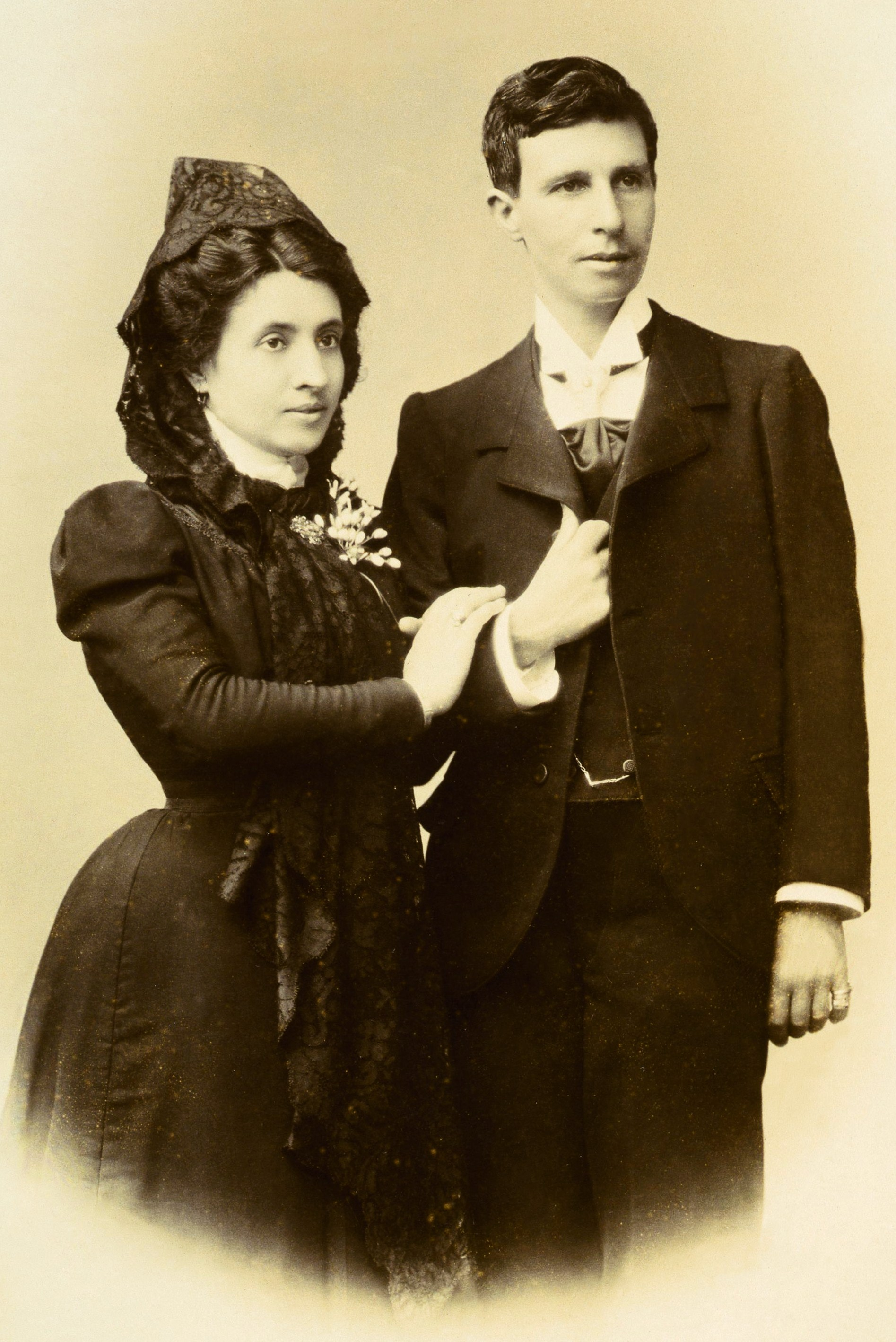
The First same-sex marriage in Spain officially took place in 1901 between Marcela Gracia Ibeas and Elisa Sanchez Loriga and was held in the Catholic Church of St.Jorge; but without the evident awareness of the priest.

Catholic Church figures have also criticized attempts to legalize same-sex marriage in Europe. Pope John Paul II criticized same-sex marriage when it was introduced in the Netherlands in 2001. In Spain and Portugal, Catholic leaders led the opposition to same-sex marriage, urging their followers to vote against it or to refuse to implement the marriages should they become legal. In May 2010, during an official visit to Portugal four days before the ratification of the law, Pope Benedict XVI affirmed his opposition by describing it as "insidious and dangerous".

In 2010 in Ireland, Sean Brady, the Archbishop of Armagh, unsuccessfully asked Irish Catholics to resist government proposals for same-sex civil partnerships, and the Irish episcopal conference said that they discriminated against people in non-sexual relationships. In April 2013, when the legalization of same-sex marriage was being discussed, the Irish Bishops Conference stated in their submission to a constitutional convention that, if the civil definition of marriage was changed to include same-sex marriage, so that it differed from the church's own definition, they could no longer perform civil functions at weddings.

In the predominantly Catholic countries of Italy and Croatia, the Catholic Church has been the main opponent to either the introduction of civil unions or marriage for same-sex-couples. In July 2013, 750,000 petition signatures were collected by the conservative group "In the Name of the Family", strongly supported by Catholic church leaders. This directly led to the 2013 referendum whereby the constitution was amended to state that marriage is only a union between a man and a woman. In February 2016 the Italian Prime Minister, Matteo Renzi, rejected the Catholic Church's interference in a parliamentary debate to introduce civil unions and adoption rights for same-sex partners. This followed Bagnasco's (Archbishop of Genoa) attempt to get the Italian Senate to carry out a secret ballot in the hope it would make it easier for lawmakers to follow their conscience, rather than the party line. Bagnasco had compared the idea of recognizing same-sex unions directly with state recognition for incest and pedophilia.

Likewise in Slovenia, the Archbishop of Ljubljana, Stanislav Zore, publicly gave his support to establish a referendum vote aimed at changing the country's constitution so that marriage would be defined as being between a man and a woman. The referendum was subsequently passed and the earlier legislative vote to legalise same-sex marriage was nullified. In January 2013, Catholic bishops publicly thanked members of parliament in Poland for voting down a bill which would have permitted same-sex civil partnerships. In response to the legalisation of gay marriage in Austria in 2017, the president of the Austrian bishop's conference, Cardinal Christoph Schönborn denounced the move, arguing that marriage is a male-female relationship intended for "producing, nurturing and raising children, thus ensuring the succession of generations".

=== Belgium ===
In November 2022 all Roman Catholic bishops in Belgium allowed blessing ceremonies for same-sex couples.

=== Germany ===
In May 2021 and May 2022 in over hundred Roman Catholic churches in Germany blessings of same-sex marriages were celebrated for example in the cathedral of Magdeburg or in Essen, where German Roman Catholic bishop Ludger Schepers was at place. On 11 March 2023, the Synodal Path with support of over 80% of German Roman Catholic bishops called for blessing ceremonies for same-sex couples in German Roman Catholic dioceses. In April 2025, Roman Catholic bishop conference published a manual for blessing ceremonies for same-sex unions.

== South America ==
In response to efforts to introduce same-sex marriage in Uruguay in 2013, Pablo Galimberti, the Bishop of Salto, on behalf of the Uruguayan Bishops Council, said that marriage was "an institution that is already so injured" and that the proposed law would "confuse more than clarify". The proposal nevertheless became law, with strong public support.

== Africa ==
In Cameroon, Victor Tonye Bakot, the Archbishop of Yaounde, reflected a particularly hostile attitude by the Church in Cameroon, with such interventions prompting the national press to allege the existence of a homosexual "mafia" with a witch-hunt against prominent individuals. In 2013 and 2016, the National Episcopal Conference of Cameroon followed this up by issuing a public statement urging "all believers and people of good will" to oppose gay marriage and the decriminalization of homosexuality.

In 2014, the Catholic Bishops Conference in Nigeria welcomed legislation passed by the government to make participation in a same-sex marriage a crime punishable by 14 years imprisonment. It noted the move as a "courageous act" and a "step in the right direction". The Archbishop of Jos, Ignatius Ayau Kaigama, argued that the action was "in line with the moral and ethical values of the Nigerian and African cultures", and blessed President Goodluck Jonathan in not bowing to international pressure. The Catholic church also had a strong opposition against LGBTQ rights in many Christian majority countries like Kenya, Zambia, Angola, Uganda, Zimbabwe, South Africa, Ghana, Liberia, Mozambique, and the Central African Republic.

== Asia ==
In the Philippines, the Catholic Bishops' Conference of the Philippines has been increasingly vocal in its opposition to legal recognition of same-sex relationships, coinciding with a legal challenge to the ban on same-sex marriage in the Family Code being raised in the Philippines Supreme Court. In August 2015, Archbishop Socrates Villegas told Filipino Catholics that they "cannot participate in any way or even attend religious or legal ceremonies that celebrate and legitimize homosexual unions".

In Hong Kong, Cardinal John Tong Hon has used pastoral letters on two occasions to criticise proposals to legislate for same-sex marriage, most recently in 2015. He urged Catholics to consider this when voting in the district council elections. Several pan-democratic parties criticised Tong's remarks.

== Australia ==
In 2015, the Archbishop of Hobart, Julian Porteous, with the support of the Australian Catholic Bishops Conference distributed a booklet to 12,000 families with children in Catholic schools across Tasmania entitled "Don't Mess With Marriage", describing relationships between gay couples as "pretended marriage". Porteous was subsequently referred to the Australian Anti-Discrimination Commissioner. The complaint was withdrawn without a finding.

Several Australian bishops publicly supported the "no" vote in the referendum on gay marriage. In August 2017, Archbishop of Sydney Anthony Fisher argued that religious schools, charities, and hospitals could be coerced to comply with the "new view of marriage" if the majority of Australians opted for a change in legislation, raising fears that teachers would not be free to follow the traditional church teaching on marriage, but instead be forced to teach a more "politically correct" curriculum. He went on to claim that religious believers would be vulnerable to discrimination suits and could even lose their jobs if same-sex marriage were to be legalised. The Archbishop of Brisbane, Mark Coleridge, also intervened in the referendum debate to say that the state should be allowed to restrict who can marry, such as prohibitions on incest. He said that like love shared between family members, love shared between gay people "is love and it is valuable but it's not and it can't be the kind of love that we call marriage."

== Civil unions ==
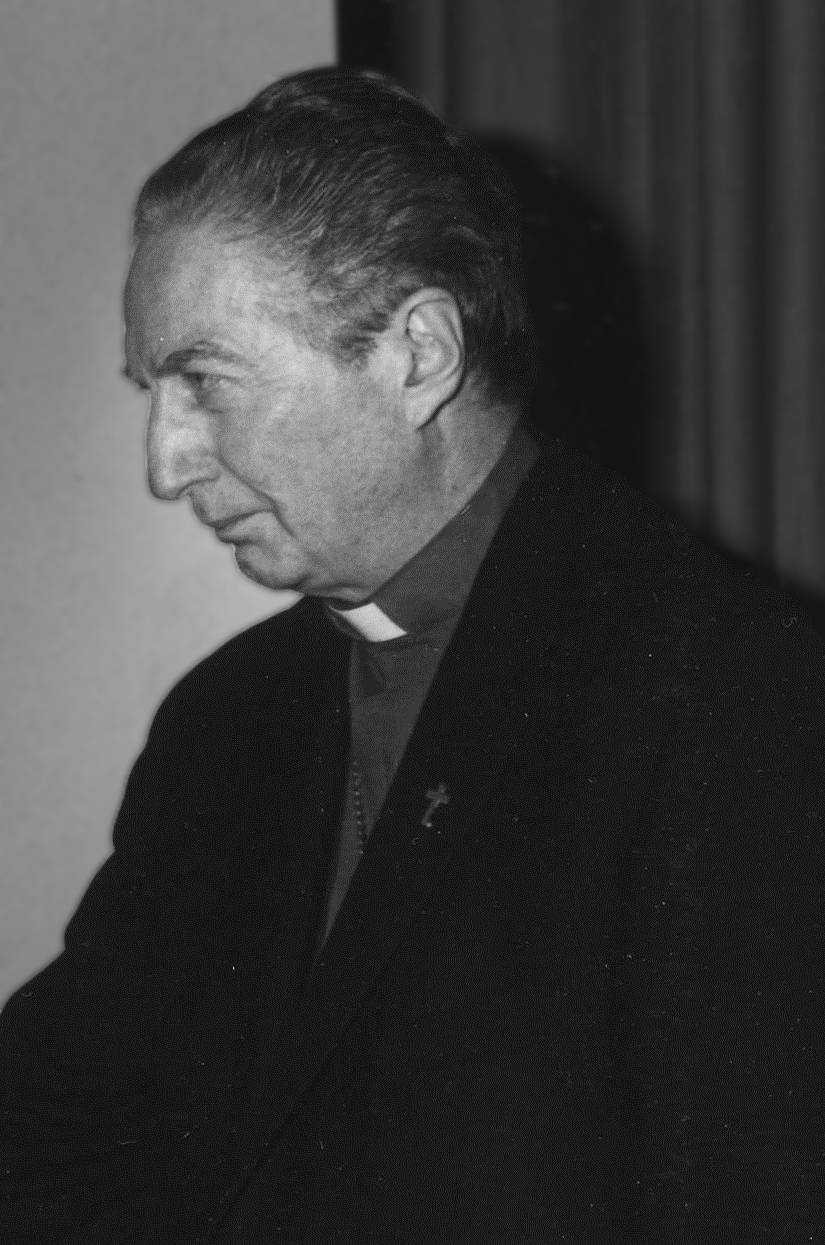
Former Cardinal Archbishop of Milan Carlo Maria Martini said: "I disagree with the positions of those in the Church, that take issue with civil unions ...[but] the homosexual couple, as such, can never be totally equated to a marriage."

There has been some dissent expressed in recent years by senior and notable figures in the Catholic Church on whether support should be given for homosexual civil unions. The insistence of Bishop Jacques Gaillot to preach a message about homosexuality contrary to that of the official church teaching is largely considered to be one of the factors that led to him being removed from his See of Evraux, France, in 1995. While bishop he had blessed a homosexual union in a "service of welcoming", after the couple requested it in view of their imminent death from AIDS.

In his book Credere e conoscere, published shortly before his death, Cardinal Carlo Maria Martini, the former Archbishop of Milan, supported civil unions, though stated they could not be considered the equivalent of heterosexual marriages. He also said he understood the need for gay self-affirmation. Cardinal Ruben Salazar Gomez of Bogota and Archbishop Piero Marini have both expressed support for civil unions.

German cardinal Reinhard Marx and Bishop Franz-Josef Bode have both opined that the blessing of same-sex unions would be possible in Catholic churches in Germany. In Austria the blessing of same sex unions are allowed in at least two churches, both located in the Roman Catholic Diocese of Linz.

In the Roman Catholic Diocese of Aachen in Germany, five same-sex unions received a blessing from the local priest in the German town of Mönchengladbach. Additionally, in 2007, one same-sex union received a blessing in the German town of Wetzlar in the Roman Catholic Diocese of Limburg. A blessing of a same-sex union, equivalent to marriage except in name, was made by a Catholic Dominican priest in Malta in 2015. He was not publicly censured by his local bishop.

Cardinal Rainer Woelki, the Archbishop of Berlin, and the Archbishop of Hamburg, Stefan Heße, have both noted the values of fidelity and reliability found in gay relationships. At the 2015 Synod of Bishops in Rome, Cardinal Reinhard Marx urged his fellow bishops that "We must make it clear that we do not only judge people according to their sexual orientation. ... If a same-sex couple are faithful, care for one another and intend to stay together for life God won't say 'All that doesn't interest me, I'm only interested in your sexual orientation.'"

Over 260 Catholic theologians, particularly from Germany, Switzerland and Austria, signed in January and February 2011 a memorandum, called Church 2011, which said that the Church's esteem for marriage and celibacy "does not require the exclusion of people who responsibly live out love, faithfulness, and mutual care in same-sex partnerships or in a remarriage after divorce".

Despite the Catholic Church's teaching on homosexual marriage, the Church has gone to great lengths to ensure that individuals who experience same-sex attraction are not denied the sacraments. Pope Frances has said that "homosexuals have a right to be a part of the family. ... They're children of God and have a right to a family. Nobody should be thrown out, or be made miserable because of it." While the Catholic Church explicitly denies its blessing for marital union between two people of the same sex, the Catechism of the Catholic Church goes into great detail when describing the legitimacy of individuals who identify as gay as beloved children of God. On 18 December 2023, non-liturgical blessings of same-sex couples, not the illicit unions themselves, were approved by pope Francis, by the declaration Fiducia supplicans published by the Dicastery for the Doctrine of the Faith, which stated that "...the Church does not have the power to impart blessings on unions of persons of the same sex."
