= Karl Josef Becker =

German Catholic theologian and cardinal-deacon (1928–2015)

His Eminence Karl Josef Becker S.J.
- Cardinal-Deacon of San Giuliano Martire
- Appointed: 18 February 2012
- Installed: 22 April 2012
- Term ended: 10 February 2015
- Predecessor: None

Orders
- Ordination: 31 July 1958
- Created cardinal: 18 February 2012 by Pope Benedict XVI
- Rank: Cardinal-Deacon

Personal details
- Born: Karl Josef Becker; 18 April 1928 Cologne, Germany
- Died: 10 February 2015 (aged 86) Rome, Italy
- Denomination: Roman Catholic
- Coat of arms

Karl Josef Becker S.J. (18 April 1928 – 10 February 2015) was a German Catholic theologian, cardinal-deacon, and consultor for the Congregation for the Doctrine of the Faith since 15 September 1977. He taught at the Pontifical Gregorian University in Rome.

== Life ==
Coat of arms of Karl Josef Cardinal Becker SJ

Becker entered the Society of Jesus on 13 April after having studied classical philology for three semesters. After the novitiate in Cologne, he studied philosophy at the Jesuit Seminary of Pullach (today Hochschule für Philosophie/Philosophical Faculty SJ in Munich) from 1950 to 1953. From 1955 to 1959, he studied theology at the University (Hochschule) for Philosophy and Theology Sankt Georgen in Frankfurt am Main. His doctoral dissertation in theology was "Die Rechtfertigungslehre nach Domingo de Soto. Das Denken eines Konzilstellnehmers vor, in und nach Trient", which he defended in 1963. It was published in 1967.

According to John L. Allen Jr., Becker enjoyed the respect and trust of then-Cardinal Joseph Ratzinger, the prefect of the congregation (and future Pope Benedict XVI). More than one theologian in trouble was advised to "go see Fr. Becker." It is widely believed, for example, that Becker was involved in the Vatican's investigation of fellow Jesuit Fr. Jacques Dupuis and his work on religious pluralism.

Becker wrote about interpretations of "subsistit in" in Lumen gentium. In 2009, it was announced that he would participate in the doctrinal discussions between the Society of St. Pius X and the Holy See.

Pope Benedict XVI made Becker a cardinal on 18 February 2012. Considering his age, Becker asked for and received dispensation not to be consecrated a bishop as required by canon law. Becker was Cardinal-Deacon of San Giuliano Martire.

Works

- "Die Rechtfertigungslehre nach Domingo de Soto: Das Denken eines Konzilsteilnehmers vor, in und nach Trient", Analecta Gregoriama, 156 U. Gregoriana Roma 1967
