= Dicastery for the Laity, Family and Life =

Dicastery of the Roman Catholic Curia

- Dicasterium pro laicis, familia et vita
- Coat of arms of the Holy See

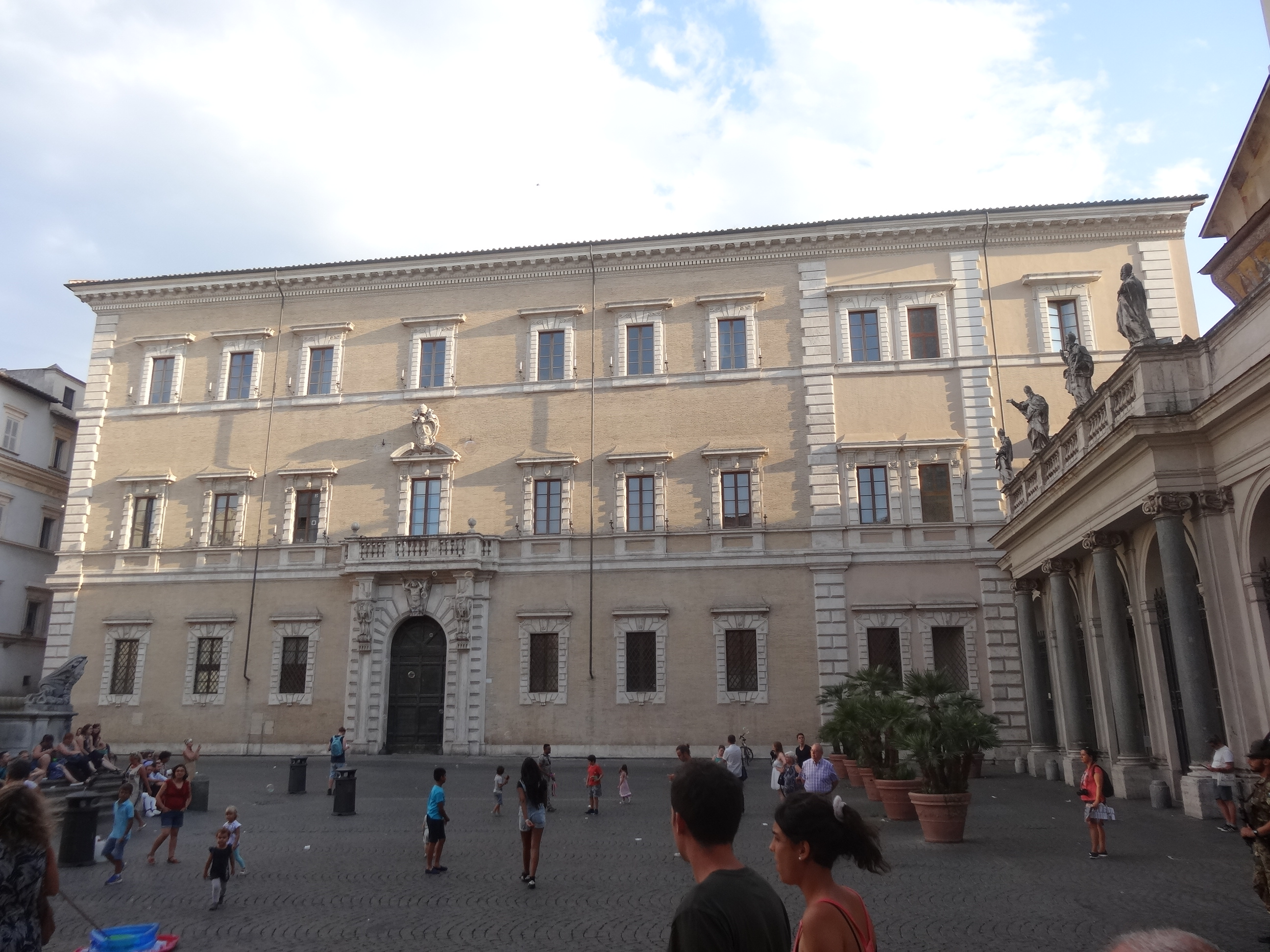
- Palace of San Callixtus, the dicastery's headquarters

Dicastery overview
- Formed: September 1, 2016; 10 years ago
- Preceding agencies: Pontifical Council for the Laity; Pontifical Council for the Family
- Type: Dicastery
- Headquarters: Palazzo San Calisto, Piazza di San Calisto 16, 00153 Rome, Italy
- Dicastery executives: Cardinal Kevin Farrell, Prefect; Gleison de Paula Souza, Secretary; Dario Gervasi, Adjunct Secretary; Linda Ghisoni, Under-Secretary; Gabriella Gambino, Under-Secretary
- Website: www.laityfamilylife.va

The Dicastery for the Laity, Family and Life (Italian: Dicastero per i laici, la famiglia e la vita, Latin: Dicasterium pro laicis, familia et vita) is a dicastery of the Roman Curia. Pope Francis announced its creation on 15 August 2016, effective 1 September 2016. It took over the functions and responsibilities of the Pontifical Council for the Laity and the Pontifical Council for the Family. It has responsibility "for the promotion of the life and apostolate of the lay faithful, for the pastoral care of the family and its mission according to God's plan and for the protection and support of human life."

== History ==
Pope Francis had announced that he intended to establish the new dicastery and replace two existing pontifical councils at the Synod of Bishops on the Family on 22 October 2015. The Council of Cardinals that he formed in April 2013 to advise him on the reform of the Roman curia had discussed the idea extensively and recommended it following a study by Cardinal Dionigi Tettamanzi, Archbishop emeritus of Milan.

The statutes governing this new body had been approved on 4 June 2016. A revised statue was published on 8 May 2018, effective 13 May. It added to its mission promoting "ecclesial reflection on the identity and mission of women in the church and in society, promoting their participation"; specified at least two undersecretaries and no longer required organization into three divisions; and both developing "guidelines for training programs for engaged couples preparing for marriage, and for young married couples" and guiding the care of couples in unorthodox marital situations.

As its first prefect, Francis named Bishop Kevin Farrell of Dallas, Texas, whom Francis telephoned in May to propose his appointment before Farrell accepted it in June. He also appointed Archbishop Vincenzo Paglia, president of the soon-to-be-abolished Pontifical Council for the Family, to head the Pontifical Academy for Life and the John Paul II Institute for Studies on Marriage and Family, which are academic centers associated (Note: "This Section [for the Family] is directly linked to the Pontifical Institute of John Paul II for Studies on Marriage and the Family, both to the central headquarters and the affiliated institutions, to ensure a common syllabus in the study of marriage, family and life."; "The Pontifical Academy for Life is connected with this Dicastery". Statutes, Articles 10, 13) with the new dicastery. Pope Francis instructed Paglia that the institutes' work should be "ever more clearly inscribed within the horizon of mercy" and that "in theological study, a pastoral perspective and attention to the wounds of humanity should never be missing".

On 31 May 2017, Pope Francis named Schoenstatt Father Alexandre Awi Mello the Dicastery's secretary. On 7 November he appointed Gabriella Gambino sub-secretary of the section on life and Linda Ghisoni sub-secretary of the section on laity. Both academics and laywomen, they became the highest ranking in the Vatican.

In May 2018, Pope Francis updated the statutes of the Dicastery for Laity, the Family and Life, adding among other things a specific reference to the office's responsibility for promoting a deeper reflection on the role of women in the church and society.

In April 2020, the dicastery issued a letter calling attention to the plight of the elderly, especially during the coronavirus emergency. While recognizing the necessity of appropriate health precautions, the letter mentioned alternative methods of addressing feelings of loneliness and abandonment: "The inability to continue making home visits has led to finding new and creative forms of presence. Calls, video or voice messages or, more traditionally, letters addressed to those who are alone. Parishes are often engaged in the delivery of food and medicines to those who are forced not to leave the house."

On 11 June 2021, the Dicastery issued new norms which impose term limits for leaders of international associations of the faithful. The leaders' terms are limited to a maximum of five years, with an international leader limited to serving two consecutive terms, after which they need to vacate the office for at least one term before being eligible to serve again. The norms took effect on 11 September that year.
