= Gerald Fitzgerald (priest) =

American Catholic priest (1894–1969)

Gerald Michael Cushing Fitzgerald, s.P. (October 29, 1894 – June 28, 1969) was an American Catholic priest who founded the Congregation of the Servants of the Paraclete, which operates centers for priests dealing with challenges such as alcoholism, substance abuse and sexual misconduct.

Fitzgerald began his ministry as a priest in the Archdiocese of Boston and later became a member of the Congregation of Holy Cross. As part of his work with abusive priests, he asked American bishops and the Vatican in the 1950s and 1960s to not reassign priests who committed sexual assault. He said that they were effectively untreatable and at risk of committing additional sex crimes and tarnishing the Church's reputation. Fitzgerald argued so forcefully for the defrocking of sexually abusive priests that it has been argued that the Catholic hierarchy was long aware of the dangers of allowing such priests to have contact with minors.

== Early life and career ==
Fitzgerald was born in Framingham, Massachusetts to Michael Edward and Mary Elizabeth Brassil Fitzgerald; he was the second of eight sons. Upon graduation from Weymouth High School, he matriculated to Boston College. In 1916, Fitzgerald entered St. John's Seminary in Brighton, Massachusetts and on May 21, 1921 was ordained for the Archdiocese of Boston in the Cathedral of the Holy Cross. He began his ministry as a parish priest in the Archdiocese of Boston where he served for 12 years.

In November 1933, Fitzgerald entered the Congregation of Holy Cross. After one year at St. Joseph's novitiate, St. Genevieve, in the Province of Quebec, Canada, he made his first profession of vows on December 8, 1934. In 1936, Fitzgerald was appointed the superior of the seminary for the college-age members of the Congregation. While with the Holy Cross Congregation, Fr. Gerald wrote "Juxta Crucem" the life of Father Basil Moreau, C.S.C., the founder of Holy Cross Congregation.

== Retreat center for troubled priests ==
While a member of the Congregation of Holy Cross, Father Gerald Fitzgerald developed a vision of a religious community whose mission would be to serve the needs of priests and members of other religious orders who were struggling with issues such as celibacy, alcohol and substance abuse problems. Fitzgerald recounted that he was inspired by an experience in which a destitute transient came to his door seeking assistance. Fitzgerald gave him assistance and was deeply moved when the transient said, as he was leaving, "I used to be a priest." Fitzgerald reported that he was stricken by the fact that the man had given up his vocation and that nothing had been done to rehabilitate him.

When Fitzgerald put out a request for a sponsor who would provide a location for him to situate his new religious order, Archbishop Edwin V. Byrne of Santa Fe was the only person who responded. Fitzgerald accepted and moved quickly, buying 2,000 acres (8.1 km^{2}) in the Jemez. He founded The Congregation of the Servants of the Paraclete in Jemez Springs, New Mexico in 1947.

This new congregation opened a retreat center for troubled priests at Jemez Springs and eventually grew to operate as many as 23 such centers around the world. Later, a halfway house was set up in Albuquerque's South Valley, and other centers were established in St. Louis and in Gloucestershire, England.

Fitzgerald's therapeutic approach was focused on spiritual healing based on his conviction that intense prayer could bring about the changes needed in the priest's behavior. In dealing with alcoholism, for example, he opposed Alcoholics Anonymous.

== Treatment of sexually abusive priests ==
Although Fitzgerald started the Servants of the Paraclete to assist priests who were struggling with alcohol and substance abuse problems, he soon began receiving priests who had sexually abused minors. Initially, Fitzgerald attempted to treat such priests using the same spiritual methods that he used with his other "guests". By 1948, Fitzgerald had set a policy whereby he refused to take priests who were sexually attracted to young people. In a letter sent to a priest in 1948 Fitzgerald said "It is now a fixed policy of our house to refuse problem cases that involve abnormalities of sex." The policy was changed, probably at the insistence of bishops, because Fr. Gerald's letters reveal that he had indeed offered help to several priests with such sexual problems in the years between 1948 and his death in 1969. In 1957, Fitzgerald wrote of the Paracletes' intent to stop taking sexual abusers: "Experience has taught us these men are too dangerous to the children of the parish and neighborhood for us to be justified in receiving them here."

Despite his reluctant acceptance of at least some sexually abusive priests to his treatment program, Fitzgerald became increasingly convinced that such priests could not be cured, could not be trusted to maintain celibacy, and should be laicized even against their will. Therefore, he was vehemently opposed to the return of sexual abusers to their former duties as parish priests. Although some bishops followed Fitzgerald's recommendations by not assigning sexually abusive priests to parish duties, other bishops ignored Fitzgerald's advice. In general, it appears that bishops relied upon the advice of medical and psychological experts who asserted that treatment and return to ministry were feasible for sexually abusive priests.

=== Warnings to the Church hierarchy ===
Over the next two decades, Fitzgerald wrote to bishops in the United States and Vatican officials, including the pope, stating that most of the priesthood's sexual abusers could not be cured and should be laicized immediately.

In a 1952 letter to Bishop Robert Dwyer of Reno, Fitzgerald wrote:

I myself would be inclined to favor laicization for any priest, upon objective evidence, for tampering with the virtue of the young, my argument being, from this point onward the charity to the Mystical Body should take precedence over charity to the individual, [...] Moreover, in practice, real conversions will be found to be extremely rare [...] Hence, leaving them on duty or wandering from diocese to diocese is contributing to scandal or at least to the approximate danger of scandal.

In a letter written in 1957 to Archbishop Byrne, his ecclesiastical sponsor and co-founder of the Paracletes, Fitzgerald suggested that child abusers be assigned to a life of prayer on an island away from society.

In April 1962, Fitzgerald prepared a report at the request of the Congregation of the Holy Office discussing sexual abuse of minors, among other issues. His five-page document responded to the query concerning "the tremendous problem presented by the priest who through lack of priestly self-discipline has become a problem to Mother Church." One of his recommendations was for "a more distinct teaching in the last years of the seminary of the heavy penalty involved in tampering with the innocence (or even non-innocence) of little ones." Regarding priests who have "fallen into repeated sins ... and most especially the abuse of children, we feel strongly that such unfortunate priests should be given the alternative of a retired life within the protection of monastery walls or complete laicization."

In August 1963, he met with newly elected Pope Paul VI about his work and problems he perceived in the priesthood. His follow-up letter read: "Personally I am not sanguine of the return of priests to active duty who have been addicted to abnormal practices, especially sins with the young. However, the needs of the church must be taken into consideration and an activation of priests who have seemingly recovered in this field may be considered but is only recommended where careful guidance and supervision is possible. Where there is indication of incorrigibility, because of the tremendous scandal given, I would most earnestly recommend total laicization."

=== Assessment ===
Msgr Stephen J. Rossetti, president and CEO of Saint Luke Institute, a facility in Maryland that treats problem priests, believes Fitzgerald was ignored because he was "a lone voice speaking out of an emotional reaction to the abuse, not from scientifically sound information." The Dominican priest Thomas Doyle, on the other hand, long a critic of the church's handling of the crisis, said Fitzgerald was ignored because the bishops preferred not to confront the problem.

According to Rossetti, from 1985 through 2008 a total of 365 priests went through treatment for child sex abuse at the facility, and 22 of them, or 6 percent, relapsed. Doyle said the documents show the bishops were put on notice "five decades ago that this is a very serious problem." He said the only reason they acted in 2002 "is because they were forced to take action because of public outrage — of the media and the courts. If those things had not come into play, nothing would have happened."

== Plan for an island retreat ==
Fitzgerald developed a vision for a retreat on a remote island in the Caribbean in which sexually predatory priests would be sequestered for the remainder of their lives. In 1957, Fitzgerald mentioned this idea in a letter to Archbishop Byrne, his ecclesiastical sponsor and co-founder of the Paracletes. In 1965 Fitzgerald put a $5,000 deposit on an island in Barbados that had a total purchase price of $50,000. However, Byrne having died in 1963, Fitzgerald found that Byrne's successor, James Peter Davis was opposed to the project. Fitzgerald was forced to sell the island and abandon his vision for isolating priest sex offenders.

== Death and burial ==
Fitzgerald died of congestive heart failure on June 28, 1969 while serving as a traveling retreat master. He is buried in Resurrection Cemetery of the Servants of the Paraclete in Jemez Springs, New Mexico.

== See also ==
- Catholic sex abuse cases
- Cardinal Bernard Francis Law
- De delictis gravioribus
- Congregation of Holy Cross#Notable members
- Pederasty
- Pontifical secret
- Cardinal Roger Mahony
- Sex Crimes and the Vatican (Panorama documentary)
- Roman Catholic sex abuse cases by country
- Survivors Network of those Abused by Priests
- Virtus (program)

== Sources ==
- Early Alarm for Church on Abusers in the Clergy
- Letters to the Roman Catholic Hierarchy from Fr. Fitzgerald
- a letter sent from the Congregation for the Doctrine of the Faith by its prefect, Cardinal Joseph Ratzinger, to Bishops of the entire Catholic Church
