= Congregation of the Servants of the Paraclete =

Catholic congregation for sexually abusive clergy

The Congregation of the Servants of the Paraclete is a Catholic religious congregation of men dedicated to ministry to priests and brothers with personal difficulties. The congregation was founded in 1947 by Fr Gerald Fitzgerald in Jemez Springs, New Mexico; they are named for the Paraclete, a representation of the Holy Spirit interpreted as an advocate or helper. After a series of lawsuits related to sexually abusive priests that had been treated at its facilities, the order has consolidated their holistic programs to Vianney Renewal Center in Dittmer, Missouri, an unincorporated area outside St. Louis.

== History ==
=== Founding ===
While a member of the Congregation of Holy Cross, Father Gerald Fitzgerald developed a vision of a religious community whose mission would be to serve the needs of priests and members of other religious orders who were struggling with issues such as pedophilia, alcohol and substance abuse problems. Fitzgerald recounted that he was inspired by an experience in which a destitute transient came to his door seeking assistance. Fitzgerald gave him assistance and was deeply moved when the transient said, as he was leaving, "I used to be a priest." Fitzgerald reported that he was stricken by the fact that the man had given up his vocation and that nothing had been done to rehabilitate him.

When Fitzgerald put out a request for a sponsor who would provide a location for him to situate his new religious congregation, Edwin V. Byrne, Archbishop of Santa Fe responded. Fitzgerald accepted and moved quickly, buying 2,000 acres (8.1 km^{2}) in Jemez Springs, New Mexico, and founding the Congregation of the Servants of the Paraclete in 1947. Byrne announced the opening of the organization's headquarters, the Via Coeli Monastery, in January 1947. Press reports at the time described the Servants of the Paraclete as "a group of priests and religious brothers dedicated to the contemplative life and care of aged and infirm priests".

Fitzgerald believed in spiritual treatment, such as Eucharistic adoration, and was vehemently against psychological treatment. Later, a halfway house was set up in Albuquerque's South Valley, and other centers were established in St. Louis, Missouri and in Gloucestershire, England.

Although Fitzgerald started the Servants of the Paraclete to assist priests who were struggling with alcohol and substance abuse problems, he soon began receiving priests who had sexually abused minors. Initially, Fitzgerald attempted to treat such priests using the same spiritual methods that he used with others. By 1948, Fitzgerald had set a policy whereby he refused to take priests who were sexually attracted to children. In a letter sent to a priest in 1948 Fitzgerald said "It is now a fixed policy of our house to refuse problem cases that involve abnormalities of sex." The policy was changed, possibly at the insistence of bishops, because Fr. Gerald's letters reveal that he had indeed offered help to several priests with such sexual problems in the years between 1948 and his death in 1969.

In a 1964 letter to Bishop Joseph Durick of Nashville, Tennessee, Fitzgerald expressed "growing concern" about the dramatic change in the nature of problems that were being referred to his order:

May I take this occasion to bring to your attention what is a growing concern to many of us here in the States. When I was ordained, forty three years ago, homosexuality was a practically unknown rarity. Today it is rampant among men. And whereas seventeen years ago eight out of ten problems here [at the Paraclete facility, Via Coeli] would represent the alcoholic, now in the last year or so our admission ratio would be approximately 5-2-3: five being alcoholic, two would be what we call "heart cases" (natural affection towards women) and three representing aberrations involving homosexuality. More alarming still is that among these of the 3 out of 10 class, 2 out of 3 have been young priests.

Fitzgerald became increasingly convinced even then that such priests could not be cured, could not be trusted to maintain celibacy and should be laicized even against their will. Moreover, Fitzgerald opposed vehemently the return of sexual abusers to duties as priests in parish situations. Although some bishops refused to hire sexually abusive priests based on Fitzgerald's refusal to recommend them for parish duties, others ignored Fitzgerald's advice. In general, it appears that bishops chose to ignore Fitzgerald's recommendations, preferring to rely on the advice of medical and psychological experts who asserted that treatment was feasible.

=== Warnings to the Church hierarchy ===
Over the next two decades, Fitzgerald wrote regularly to bishops in the United States and to Vatican officials, including the pope, of his opinion that many sexual abusers in the priesthood could not be cured and should be laicized immediately.

For example, in a 1952 letter to Bishop Robert Dwyer of the Diocese of Reno, Fitzgerald wrote:

I myself would be inclined to favor laicization for any priest, upon objective evidence, for tampering with the virtue of the young, my argument being, from this point onward the charity to the Mystical Body should take precedence over charity to the individual, [...] Moreover, in practice, real conversions will be found to be extremely rare [...] Hence, leaving them on duty or wandering from diocese to diocese is contributing to scandal or at least to the approximate danger of scandal.

In 1957 Fitzgerald wrote to Matthew Francis Brady, the Bishop of Manchester:

We are amazed to find how often a man who would be behind bars if he were not a priest is entrusted with the cura animarum.

In 1962, Fitzgerald prepared a report at the request of the Congregation for the Doctrine of the Faith (then known as the Holy Office) in which he discussed the various types of sexual problems of priests, including sexual abuse of minors.

In April 1962, Fitzgerald wrote a five-page response to a query from the Vatican's Congregation of the Holy Office "the tremendous problem presented by the priest who through lack of priestly self-discipline has become a problem to Mother Church." One of his recommendations was for "a more distinct teaching in the last years of the seminary of the heavy penalty involved in tampering with the innocence (or even non-innocence) of little ones." Regarding priests who have "fallen into repeated sins ... and most especially the abuse of children, we feel strongly that such unfortunate priests should be given the alternative of a retired life within the protection of monastery walls or complete laicization."

In August of the following year, he met with newly elected Pope Paul VI to inform him about his work and problems he perceived in the priesthood. His follow-up letter contained this assessment:

Personally I am not sanguine of the return of priests to active duty who have been addicted to abnormal practices, especially sins with the young. However, the needs of the church must be taken into consideration and an activation of priests who have seemingly recovered in this field may be considered but is only recommended where careful guidance and supervision is possible. Where there is indication of incorrigibility, because of the tremendous scandal given, I would most earnestly recommend total laicization.

Fitzgerald's papers were unsealed by a judge in New Mexico in 2007 and were authenticated in depositions with Fitzgerald's successors, said Helen Zukin, a lawyer with Kiesel, Boucher & Larson, a firm in Los Angeles.

=== Dispute over treatment modalities ===
Despite the fact that he opposed secular treatment modalities — psychiatry and psychology — his followers espoused them and even trained in the treatment of sexual disorders. As a result, the Servants of the Paraclete center in Jemez Springs became the first facility in the world specifically treating sexual disorders of clergy.

=== Ouster ===
According to Fr Joseph McNamara who succeeded Fitzgerald as Servant General, Fitzgerald was eventually forced from leadership by a combination of factors, not least of which was a growing disagreement with the bishop and other members of the congregation over the direction of the Paracletes. According to McNamara, Fitzgerald "never again resided at Via Coeli Monastery, nor did he ever regain the power he had once had."

As Fitzgerald lost control, medical and psychological professionals began working at the center although he continued to resist these changes until his death in 1969. These experts said some abusers could return to ministry. The center was closed in the 1990s as the result of lawsuits over priests who had molested children while staying at Jemez Springs or after being treated at the facility.

=== Sexual abuse cases in Australia ===
Following the release of the findings of the Royal Commission into Institutional Responses to Child Sexual Abuse in Australia, it was revealed that the Catholic Church in Australia had sent abusive priests and brothers for treatment with the Congregation of the Servants of the Paraclete in New Mexico.

In December 1989, Ballarat priest Gerald Ridsdale was sent to the facility by his bishop, Ronald Mulkearns. The Director of Villa Louis Martin, Peter Lechner, wrote to Ridsdale on 3 October 1989, explaining the nature of the programme and inviting him to participate, explaining that the programme was both psychological and spiritual. In the first half of 1990, Mulkearns received at least five reports from the Villa Louis Martin facility regarding Ridsdale's treatment. Lechner wrote to Mulkearns and asked that he either destroy the reports or return them to him after he finished reading them.

Following Ridsdale's treatment, Lechner wrote to Mulkearns with a five point aftercare plan. Point three stipulated that 'He (Ridsdale) will not engage in any ministry to minors and will not otherwise be in the company of minors unless accompanied by an adult.'

On 27 May 1993, three years after he returned to Australia, Ridsdale pleaded guilty to charges of child sexual abuse and was sentenced to imprisonment. He died in Port Phillip Prison, Truganina prison in February 2025. On 4 October 1996, Mulkearns wrote to church lawyers Dunhill Madden Butler and informed them he had destroyed a letter from psychiatrist Eric Seal regarding Ridsdale's sexual offending of children.

After decades sexually abusing children in residential institutions in New Zealand and Australia, in 1992 Bernard McGrath was brought to a secret meeting at St Mary's Cathedral, Sydney where he met with Brian Lucas, the man responsible with dealing with the Catholic Church's abusive priests. McGrath's religious order, the Hospitaller Order of St John of God, had known about his sexual offending for years, with multiple complaints being ignored or dismissed.

=== Assessment ===
In April 2009, Blase Joseph Cupich then of Rapid City, South Dakota, Chairman of the United States Bishops Committee for the Protection of Children and Young People, explained why Father Fitzgerald's advice "went largely unheeded for 50 years": First, "cases of sexually abusive priests were considered to be rare." Second, Father Fitzgerald's, "views, by and large, were considered bizarre with regard to not treating people medically, but only spiritually, and also segregating a whole population with sexual problems on a deserted island." And finally, "There was mounting evidence in the world of psychology that indicated that when medical treatment is given, these people can, in fact, go back to ministry." This was a view which Cupich characterized as one that "the bishops came to regret."

Helen Zukin, a lawyer representing some of the plaintiffs against the Church, challenged this explanation, asserting that psychiatrists who worked at the Servants of the Paraclete's centers have stated in legal depositions that they had rarely recommended returning sexually abusive priests to ministry, and only if the priests were under strict supervision in settings where they were not working with children.

=== Expansion ===
At its peak, the Paraclete congregation expanded to operate a total of 23 facilities. In the U.S., these included the original center at Jemez Springs, New Mexico, as well as facilities in Dittmer, Missouri, and Nevis, Minnesota. In addition, the order opened centers in Italy, England, Scotland, France, Africa, South America and the Philippines.

The Servants of the Paraclete also operated a novitiate in Randolph, Vermont, until 1971. Its current novitiate is located in Jemez Springs, approximately one mile from the mother house.

=== Later history ===
The Very Reverend Joseph McNamara, s.P. was elected to succeed Father Fitzgerald as the second Servant General. In 1981, Fr Michael E. Foley, s.P. was elected to serve as the third Servant General. In 1987, Liam J. Hoare, s.P. was elected as the fourth Servant General, and in 1999 Rev. Peter Lechner, s.P. became the fifth Servant General.

In the 1990s, after a series of lawsuits related to sexually abusive priests that had been treated at its facilities, the order closed most of their centers. They have since consolidated their holistic programs to Vianney Renewal Center in Dittmer, Missouri, and to Our Lady of Victory Trust in Gloucestershire, England. In 1998, the Gloucestershire facility ended its ministry to priests who had committed sexual abuse. The Servants of the Paraclete also sponsor a long-term residential facility for priests and religious brothers at Vianney Renewal Center in Dittmer, Missouri where the primary emphasis is on community living. The Missouri Sex Offenders Registry shows 5 sex offenders living at the Dittmer address of the Vianney Renewal Center (6476 Eime Rd., Dittmer, MO 63023) as of April 4, 2026 and 1 more at 6467 Eime Rd.)

== Secrecy ==
In 1954, the former Franciscan priest Emmett McLoughlin published an autobiography, People's Padre, which was the first book to make public the existence of the Jemez Springs establishment:

It will come as a surprise to most Americans to know that there are institutions in the United States to which priests are sent by the bishops without any trial. One is in Oshkosh, Wisconsin ... Another, supported by the hierarchy, is in Jémez Springs, New Mexico, near Albuquerque. The 'crimes' for which priests are sent to those institutions are generally alcoholism, insubordination, or lapses in the realm of celibacy.

McLoughlin revealed a few more details about the Jemez Springs in a second book published in 1962: "The sexual affairs of priests in the U.S. are more closely guarded secrets than the classified details of our national defense."
