= The Biggest Loser season 13 =

The Biggest Loser
- Season 13
- No. of episodes: 18

Release
- Original network: NBC
- Original release: January 3 – May 1, 2012

Season chronology
- ← Previous; Season 12 (Battle of the Ages) Next → Season 14 (Challenge America)

The Biggest Loser: No Excuses is the thirteenth season of the NBC reality television series entitled The Biggest Loser. The contestants competed to win a $250,000 prize, which was awarded to Jeremy Britt, the contestant with the highest percentage of weight lost. It premiered on January 3, 2012. Alongside veteran trainer Bob Harper, Dolvett Quince returned for his second season. The contestants come to the ranch in family pairs, but are split up with one person training with Bob and one with Dolvett and the teams competing against each other and their loved ones in challenges.

== Contestants ==
Name	Couples Team	Black vs. Red (Wk. 1–7)	Black vs. Red (Wk. 8–10)	Singles	Status	Total votes
Ben Shuh, 34, Howell, MI	Brown Team	Black Team			Eliminated Week 1	5/9
Mike Messina, 41, Oakland, CA	Blue Team	Red Team			Eliminated Week 2	5/9
Joe Messina, 38, Auburn, NY	Blue Team	Black Team			Quit Week 3	^{[Q]}
Lauren Lee, 26, Poolesville, MD	Yellow Team	Red Team			Eliminated Week 3	4/8
Gail Lee, 57, Poolesville, MD	Yellow Team	Black Team			Eliminated Week 4	4/7
Nancy Rajala, 63, Fowlerville, MI	Orange Team	Red Team			Eliminated Week 5	6/8
Adrian Dortch, 34, Evanston, IL	Aqua Team	Red Team			Eliminated Week 6	4/7
Roy Pickler, 63, Middlebury, IN	Red Team	Red Team			Eliminated Week 7	4/6
Daphne Dortch, 37, Evanston, IL	Aqua Team	Black Team	Black Team		Eliminated Week 8	4/7
Isaac "Chism" Cornelison, 19, Magnolia, TX	Gray Team	Black Team	Black Team		Eliminated Week 9	^{[R]}
Cassandra Sturos, 25, Fowlerville, MI	Orange Team	Black Team	Black Team		Eliminated Week 10	3/5
Emily Joy, 29, Huntersville, NC	Pink Team	Black Team	Black Team	Pink	Eliminated Week 11	5/8
Kimmy Stone, 48, Dittmer, MO	Purple Team	Red Team	Red Team	Purple	Eliminated Week 12	3/6
Megan Stone, 21, Dittmer, MO	Purple Team	Black Team	Black Team	Purple	Eliminated Week 13	3/5
Christine "Chris" Pickler, 42, Middlebury, IN	Red Team	Black Team	Black Team	Red	Eliminated Week 14	2/4
Mark Cornelison, 43, Magnolia, TX	Gray Team	Red Team	Red Team	Gray	Quit Week 15	^{[Q]}
Allen "Buddy" Shuh, 42, Wayne, MI	Brown Team	Red Team	Red Team	Brown	Quit Week 15	^{[Q]}
Conda Britt, 24, Rockford, MI	Green Team	Red Team	Black Team	Green	2nd Runner-Up	
Kim Nielsen, 38, Roswell, GA	Pink Team	Red Team	Red Team	Pink	Runner-Up	
Jeremy Britt, 22, Rockford, MI	Green Team	Black Team	Red Team	Green	Biggest Loser	

The "Total Votes" column indicates the number of votes cast against the contestant when he/she was eliminated.
^[Auto] This contestant was automatically eliminated being the last one standing on their trainer's team without any votes.
^[R] This contestant fell below the Red Line and was eliminated without any votes.
^[Q] This contestant quit the competition, and did not come back for the battle for the last finalist spot or attend the finale.
^[E1] This team lost the challenge to gain contestant status and had to return Week 5 for a second chance weigh-in into the game. They had to lose 50 lbs. as a team to return, and successfully done so.

== Weigh-ins ==
Contestants are listed in reverse chronological order of elimination.

Contestant	Age	Height	Starting BMI	Ending BMI	Starting weight	Week														Semi- final	Finale	Weight lost	Percentage lost
Contestant	Age	Height	Starting BMI	Ending BMI	Starting weight	1	2	3	4	5	6	7	8	9	10	11	12	13	14	Semi- final	Finale	Weight lost	Percentage lost
Jeremy	22	5'6"	62.8	30.7	389	376	369	358	347	338	326	320	309	289	282	273	266	260	249	239	190	199	51.16%
Kim	38	5'8"	38.3	20.4	252	239	236	230	220	215	209	200	193	186	182	176	171	164	162	147	134	118	46.83%
Conda	24	5'6"	47.5	28.9	294	285	278	275	265	263	255	245	246	231	228	221	217	210	205	195	179	115	39.12%
Mark	43	6'0"	39.5	X	291	282	274	266	255	251	244	234	226	215	213	204	200	200	196	WD	Did not attend		
Buddy	42	6'0"	54.7	X	403	381	372	363	353	345	336	329	317	294	289	281	275	269	260	WD	Did not attend		
Chris	42	5'3"	42.5	28.9	240	232	226	222	215	211	206	201	196	185	184	177	174	170	172	166	163	77	32.08%
Megan	21	5'5"	43.1	30.5	259	252	248	240	238	229	223	219	217	205	204	198	195	191		189	183	76	29.34%
Kimmy	48	5'4"	37.6	25.4	219	210	206	203	197	193	188	184	179	169	167	163	161			154	148	71	32.42%
Emily	29	5'5"	43.9	27.0	264	254	250	244	235	230	223	218	216	199	195	190				175	162	102	38.64%
Cassandra	25	5'7"	37.4	23.0	239	225	220	212	206	200	195	189	188	175	172					158	147	92	38.49%
Chism	19	5'11"	50.3	36.0	361	349	341	332	320	318	305	298	293	282						265	258	103	28.53%
Daphne	37	5'5"	45.1	30.5	271	X	X	X	245	244	236	224	226							204	183	88	32.47%
Roy	63	6'0"	41.5	29.6	306	292	287	278	272	268	261	252								227	218	88	28.76%
Adrian	34	6'3"	46.2	32.7	370	X	X	X	336	334	325									291	262	108	29.19%
Nancy	63	5'3"	38.4	28.5	217	212	207	205	200	196										168	161	56	25.81%
Gail	57	5'10"	46.2	33.7	322	313	308	302	297											249	235	87	27.02%
Lauren	26	5'5"	40.9	26.1	246	237	233	230												172*	157	89	36.18%
Joe	38	5'9"	52.7	X	357	342	334	WD													Did not attend		
Mike	41	6'2"	46.0	25.4	358	345	338													244*	198	160	44.69%
Ben	34	6'3"	49.5	32.1	396	381														297	257	139	35.10%

Standings
Week's Biggest Loser (Team or Individuals)
Week's Biggest Loser and Immunity
Immunity (Challenge or Weigh-in)
Results from At-Home players
Contestant Withdrew before Weigh-In

BMI
Underweight (less than 18.5 BMI)
Normal (18.5 – 24.9 BMI)
Overweight (25 – 29.9 BMI)
Obese Class I (30 – 34.9 BMI)
Obese Class II (35 – 39.9 BMI)
Obese Class III (greater than 40 BMI)

Winners
$250,000 Winner (among the finalists)
$100,000 Winner (among the eliminated contestants)

=== Weigh-In Difference History ===
Contestant	Week														Semi- final	Finale
Contestant	1	2	3	4	5	6	7	8	9	10	11	12	13	14	Semi- final	Finale
Jeremy	−13	−7	−11	−11	−9	−12	−6	−11	−20	−7	−9	−7	−6	−11	−10	−49
Kim	−13	−3	−6	−10	−5	−6	−9	−7	−7	−4	−6	−5	−7	−2	−15	−13
Conda	−9	−7	−3	−10	−2	−8	−10	+1	−15	−3	−7	−4	−7	−5	−10	−16
Mark	−9	−8	−8	−11	−4	−7	−10	−8	−11	−2	−9	−4	0	−4	WD	X
Buddy	−22	−9	−9	−10	−8	−9	−7	−12	−23	−5	−8	−6	−6	−9	WD	X
Chris	−8	−6	−4	−7	−4	−5	−5	−5	−11	−1	−7	−3	−4	+2	-6	-3
Megan	−7	−4	−8	−2	−9	−6	−4	−2	−12	−1	−6	−3	−4	-2		-6
Kimmy	−9	−4	−3	−6	−4	−5	−4	−5	−10	−2	−4	−2	-7			-6
Emily	−10	−4	−6	−9	−5	−7	−5	−2	−17	−4	−5	-15				-13
Cassandra	−14	−5	−8	−6	−6	−5	−6	−1	−13	−3	-14					-11
Chism	−12	−8	−9	−12	−2	−13	−7	−5	−11	-17						-7
Daphne	-26				−1	−8	−12	+2	-22							-21
Roy	−14	−5	−9	−6	−4	−7	−9	-25								-9
Adrian	-34				−2	−9	-34									-29
Nancy	−5	−5	−2	−5	−4	-28										-7
Gail	−9	−5	−6	−5	-48											-14
Lauren	−9	−4	−3	-58												-15
Joe	−15	−8	WD	X												X
Mike	−13	−7	-94													-46
Ben	−15	-84														-40

Notes

- Conda's 15 pound weight loss in week 9 was displayed as a −14 due to her weight gain the previous week.
- Megan's 6 pound weight loss in week 11 was displayed as a −7 due to her 1 lb advantage from the challenge.
- Chris's 3 pound weight loss in week 12 was displayed as −4 due to her 1 lb advantage from the challenge.
- Mark's 0 pound weight loss in week 13 was displayed as −1 due to his 1 lb advantage from the challenge.
- Buddy's 9 pound weight loss in week 14 was displayed as −10 due to his 1 lb advantage from the challenge.
- Conda's 5 pound weight loss in week 14 was displayed as −4 due to her 1 lb disadvantage from the challenge.

=== Weigh-in percentages history ===
Contestant	Week														Semi- final	Finale
Contestant	1	2	3	4	5	6	7	8	9	10	11	12	13	14	Semi- final	Finale
Jeremy	−3.34%	−1.86%	−2.98%	−3.07%	−2.59%	−3.55%	−1.84%	−3.44%	−6.47%	−2.42%	−3.19%	−2.56%	−2.26%	−4.23%	−4.02%	−20.50%
Kim	−5.16%	−1.26%	−2.54%	−4.35%	−2.27%	−2.79%	−4.31%	−3.50%	−3.63%	−2.15%	−3.30%	−2.84%	−4.09%	−1.22%	−9.26%	−8.84%
Conda	−3.06%	−2.46%	−1.08%	−3.64%	−0.75%	−3.04%	−3.92%	+0.41%	−6.10%	−1.30%	−3.07%	−1.81%	−3.23%	−2.38%	−4.88%	−8.21%
Buddy	−5.46%	−2.36%	−2.42%	−2.75%	−2.27%	−2.61%	−2.08%	−3.65%	−7.26%	−1.70%	−2.77%	−2.14%	−2.18%	−3.35%	WD	X
Mark	−3.09%	−2.84%	−2.92%	−4.14%	−1.57%	−2.79%	−4.10%	−3.42%	−4.87%	−0.93%	−4.23%	−1.96%	0.00%	−2.00%	WD	X
Chris	−3.33%	−2.59%	−1.77%	−3.15%	−1.86%	−2.37%	−2.43%	−2.49%	−5.61%	−0.54%	−3.80%	−1.69%	−2.30%	+1.18%	-3.49%	-1.81%
Megan	−2.70%	−1.59%	−3.23%	−0.83%	−3.78%	−2.62%	−1.79%	−0.91%	−5.53%	−0.49%	−2.94%	−1.52%	−2.05%	-1.05%		-3.17%
Kimmy	−4.11%	−1.90%	−1.46%	−2.96%	−2.03%	−2.59%	−2.13%	−2.72%	−5.59%	−1.18%	−2.40%	−1.23%	-4.35%			-3.90%
Emily	−3.79%	−1.57%	−2.40%	−3.69%	−2.13%	−3.04%	−2.24%	−0.92%	−7.87%	−2.01%	−2.56%	-7.89%				-7.43%
Cassandra	−5.86%	−2.22%	−3.64%	−2.83%	−2.91%	−2.50%	−3.17%	−0.53%	−6.91%	−1.71%	-8.14%					-6.96%
Chism	−3.32%	−2.29%	−2.64%	−3.61%	−0.63%	−4.09%	−2.30%	−1.68%	−3.75%	-6.03%						-2.64%
Daphne	-9.59%				−0.41%	−3.28%	−5.08%	+0.89%	-9.73%							-10.29%
Roy	−4.58%	−1.71%	−3.14%	−2.16%	−1.47%	−2.61%	−3.45%	-9.92%								-3.96%
Adrian	-9.19%				−0.60%	−2.69%	-10.46%									-9.97%
Nancy	−2.30%	−2.36%	−0.97%	−2.44%	−2.00%	-14.29%										-4.17%
Gail	−2.80%	−1.60%	−1.95%	−1.66%	-16.16%											-5.62%
Lauren	−3.66%	−1.69%	−1.29%	-25.22%												-8.72%
Joe	−4.20%	−2.34%	WD	X												X
Mike	−3.63%	−2.03%	-27.81%													-18.85%
Ben	−3.79%	-22.05%														-13.47%

Notes

- Conda's 6.10% weight loss in week 9 was displayed as 5.71% due to her weight gain the previous week.
- Megan's 2.94% weight loss in week 11 was displayed as 3.43% due to her 1 lb advantage from the challenge.
- Chris's 1.69% weight loss in week 12 was displayed as 2.26% due to her 1 lb advantage from the challenge.
- Mark's 0.00% weight loss in week 13 was displayed as 0.50% due to his 1 lb advantage from the challenge.
- Buddy's 3.35% weight loss in week 14 was displayed as 3.72% due to his 1 lb advantage from the challenge.
- Conda's 2.38% weight loss in week 14 was displayed as 1.90% due to her 1 lb disadvantage from the challenge.

== Elimination voting history ==
Contestant	Week															
Contestant	1	2	3	4	5	6	7	8	9	10	11	12	13	14	15	Finale
Eliminated	Ben	Mike	Joe	Gail	Nancy	Adrian	Roy	Daphne	Chism	Cassandra	Emily	Kimmy	Megan	Chris	Mark	None
Eliminated	Ben	Mike	Lauren	Gail	Nancy	Adrian	Roy	Daphne	Chism	Cassandra	Emily	Kimmy	Megan	Chris	Buddy	None
Eliminated	Ben	Mike	Lauren	Gail	Nancy	Adrian	Roy	Daphne	Chism	Cassandra	Emily	Kimmy	Megan	Chris	Jeremy	None
Jeremy	?	X	X	Chris	X	X	X	X	X	Chris	Emily	Kimmy	Megan	?	X	The Biggest Loser
Kim	X	Mike	Nancy	X	Nancy	Adrian	Roy	X	X	Chris	Kimmy	?	?	X	X	Runner-Up
Conda	X	Mike	Lauren	X	Nancy	Adrian	Roy	Daphne	X	X	Kimmy	?	Megan	Chris	X	2nd Runner-Up
Mike	X	Conda	Eliminated Week 2													Re-eliminated at Final Challenge
Lauren	X	?	Nancy	Eliminated Week 3												Re-eliminated at Final Challenge
Buddy	X	?	Lauren	X	Nancy	Adrian	?	X	X	Cassandra	?	Kimmy	?	Chris	WD	Withdrew Week 15
Mark	X	?	Lauren	X	Nancy	Adrian	Roy	X	X	Cassandra	Emily	Kimmy	X	?	WD	Withdrew Week 15
Chris	Ben	X	X	Gail	X	X	X	Chism	X	X	Emily	?	Megan	X	Eliminated Week 14	
Megan	Ben	X	X	Gail	X	X	X	Daphne	X	X	Emily	X	X	Eliminated Week 13		
Kimmy	X	Mike	Lauren	X	Nancy	?	Roy	X	X	Cassandra	X	X	Eliminated Week 12			
Emily	Ben	X	X	Gail	X	X	X	Daphne	X	X	X	Eliminated Week 11				
Cassandra	?	X	X	Gail	X	X	X	Daphne	X	X	Eliminated Week 10					
Chism	Ben	X	X	Chris	X	X	X	?	X	Eliminated Week 9						
Daphne	X	X	X	X	X	X	X	Conda	Eliminated Week 8							
Roy	X	Mike	Nancy	X	Nancy	Mark	Kimmy	Eliminated Week 7								
Adrian	X	X	X	X	Mark	Mark	Eliminated Week 6									
Nancy	X	Mike	Kim	X	Mark	Eliminated Week 5										
Gail	Ben	X	X	Chris	Eliminated Week 4											
Joe	?	X	WD	Withdrew Week 3												
Ben	?	Eliminated Week 1														

X Not in house for vote
Immunity
? Immunity, vote not revealed
X Immunity, was below yellow line or not in elimination, unable to vote
X Below yellow line or up for elimination, unable to vote
X Below red line, only player on losing team without immunity or last player standing on team under yellow line, automatically eliminated.
X On the losing team, but safe due to only one person not having immunity.
X Not in elimination, unable to vote
Eliminated or not in house
X Contestant quit the competition
Valid vote cast
? Vote not revealed or unknown
$250,000 winner (among the finalists)

Notes

- Joe quit the competition in Week 3, elimination took place as normal however.
- In Week 10, the Black Team couldn't vote one player off. Instead, each member of the Red Team had one vote for any member of the Black Team they wanted to, except Emily, the Biggest Loser of the week with immunity.
- Mark voted twice in Week 11 as a reward from a challenge.
- In Week 14, Chris had the lowest percentage of weight loss, so she was eliminated after receiving 2 of the 4 votes. Kim was under the yellow line, but she had the higher percentage of the two so if there was a tie or just 2 votes Chris would get eliminated. And Christine was then eliminated.
- All five contestants threatened to leave the show on Semi-Finals week 15 because of disagreements with the game's rules and the show's future twist that one eliminated contestant would return for a chance to become an automatic finalist. Both Mark and Buddy did not want to abide with the rules any longer and quit the competition. For the first time in the show's history, three contestants are left in the ranch and will still be competing for elimination at the end of the week. The red line that week fell Jeremy below the red line and therefore became the last eliminated. 14 of the previously eliminated contestants and Jeremy will compete for the last finalist spot before the finale. This spot was Rewarded to Jeremy. He stood on a Stool holding a Mega-Biggest Loser Ticket for More than 4 Hours, Defeating Mike and Lauren in that Challenge.

== Weekly summaries ==
=== Week 1 ===
First aired January 3, 2012

Ten Couples arrived to the Biggest Loser Ranch. However, One team will be sent home. To determine who would be eliminated, the contestants competed in a three-round competition. The first round was to run a 40 meters to the finish line. The first four teams to cross the line were given a spot on campus. The remaining six competed in the second round. The Second round teams had to complete a puzzle. Once they finished the puzzle, they ran 40 meter-dash to the finish line. The first four teams to complete the puzzle and run to the finish line were given a spot on campus. The final two teams competed in an endurance based challenge. The Pink team won the challenge and were given a spot on campus. The Aqua team got sent home with a twist. If the Aqua team can lose 50 pounds in one month, they will be able to return to campus. On campus, Alison said that this season the players will be playing against their partners. The Red team wins the weigh in with 3.98 percent of their total weight loss. The black team is up for elimination. Cassandra has the highest loss of the black team so she gets immunity. Ben requested to go home and the black team accepted his wish. With 5 of 9 votes cast, he is sent home. In the contestant catch-up segment, Ben has lost 50 pounds and wants to lose 150 pounds by the finale.

=== Week 2 ===
First aired January 10, 2012

The teams will bet how much their team can lose. The red team made the bet of 3.8%(94 pounds). Many contestants, plus Bob and Dolvett, think that Kim and Kimmy were not thinking and that what they did was crazy, as during a typical second week on campus the contestants only lose an average of 2%. If the red team comes up short, the black team will win a 5-pound advantage. The teams competed in their first challenge. The red had to bench Nancy due to having one more member than the black team. The teams have to spin around to obtain the puzzle pieces. The black team barely won the challenge, with red team losing by a second too late. The black team won a six-month Biggest Loser meal plan. At the weigh in the red team only lost 52 pounds so the black team gets the 5 pound advantage. Had the red team made the bet wisely, they could have won the weigh in with the 5 pound advantage. Chris had the highest weight loss on the winner team, and she chose to save Roy. At the elimination table, Mike is voted out with five votes. At the catch up segment, he had lost 56 pounds. By the finale, he wants to lose 120 pounds and be nicotine free.

=== Week 3 ===
First aired January 17, 2012

The week's theme is Face-off—players will be paired with someone on the other team, and whoever loses more weight of the pair wins a point for their team. The team with the most points wins. This is done in association with a temptation challenge: whichever team eats the most calories of Chinese food in 5 minutes gets to pick the pairs, and gets a 2-pound advantage. The Red Team eats nothing, deciding it would be like an alcoholic taking a drink. The Black Team eats 2 fortune cookies, so they win. Meanwhile, Joe misses his family. Jeremy provides great advice telling Joe that his two- and four-year-old kids won't remember their dad being gone, but they will remember him being skinny when they are older. Ultimately, Joe decides to go home in the middle of the week, to everyone's disappointment. Bob calls him and takes the loud tone with him, but to no avail. Because he has left, he automatically loses his weigh-in face-off against Nancy, giving the red team their first point before the weigh-in ever starts.

At the gym, drama erupts as players informally compete, at Dolvett's instigation, in small challenges, with their weigh-in partner. Conda accuses Cassandra of cheating in their competition, though the video and witnesses pick up nothing amiss. The reward challenge involves a windmill with buckets that need to be filled, with water that is used to melt ice and get to a cylinder with the reward in it. The Red Team wins and gets video chats with their families. Some give up their prize to other people, though. After the chats, there is an update from the Aqua team, who are a week away from being able to try and earn their chance to get back on the ranch! Bob surprises Adrian and Daphne and takes them to Planet Fitness to work them out hard. After Joe withdrew, Bob notes how strongly the Aqua team wants to earn a spot on the ranch. Dolvett arranges a rematch between Conda and Cassandra, which Cassandra again wins. At the weigh in, the Black Team wins for the second week in a row. The drama between Conda and Cassandra continues at the weigh-in, with Cassandra becoming the Biggest Loser overall in the house, while Conda's losses are disappointing. Dolvett criticizes Conda's work ethic and dedication. At the elimination, Lauren is voted off, with those who voted for her saying that she'll do well at home. At home, Lauren has lost 53 pounds and runs a half-marathon.

=== Week 4 ===
First aired January 24, 2012
60 minute episode

Buddy had to leave temporarily because his wife was expecting and he had to be with her, but he had to return for the weigh-in and his weight did count. The teams had to compete in a challenge. The team that lost the challenge would lose the gym for a week. The challenge is an obstacle course with several series of doors labeled A and B. Before going through a door, they must answer a question about health and nutrition, then ram through the door that has the correct answer. The red team won, because their opponents got every single question wrong. The aqua team is just one week away from weighing in at the ranch, so Dolvett pays them a visit to check their progress and give them a workout. Chris is having a tough time following her loss at the challenge. She wouldn't let cameras around and locked herself in the bathroom, crying and swearing to Roy and saying she wants to go home. Bob is called in and he talked her down off the ledge. Gail cried to Bob and Nancy shoots Dolvett an attitude while he tried to coach her on the treadmill. Dolvett sent Conda out of the gym because she was difficult to work with. Despite that, Conda does well and the red team wins, despite a fantastic showing from the black team. With a tie between Gail and Chris, Emily casts the deciding vote to send Gail home. Gail has lost 56 pounds to date.

=== Week 5 ===
First aired January 31, 2012

The Aqua team had a chance to get back on campus, they had to lose 50 lbs or more as a team, and they lost 60 lbs as a team. They were back in the competition, and had immunity, as long as neither one gained weight. The challenge involved two members of each team retrieving a medicine ball to throw it off a trampoline and then have their teammates catch it. Once the ball was caught, the four players had to carry the ball and put it in the net. If the ball lands on the ground the point doesn't count. The purple ball counts as one point, yellow for two, and blue for four. The first team to earn 100 points wins the challenge. The winning team gets to pick one person from each team to have their weight not count. The Red Team wins the challenge. There is conflict between the members of the red team. This conflict is evident throughout the entire episode. During the weigh in, the numbers are not impressive. The red team eventually lose, and decides to send Nancy home. Nancy is one of the oldest members in the game. Once Nancy got home, she weighed 178 pounds. She hopes to rap about how good she looks at the finale, and plans to win the at-home prize.

=== Week 6 ===
First aired February 7, 2012

Cassandra, in tears learning about Nancy's exit, receives Adrian's summation of her grandmother exit. Because Adrian made a conscious choice to out a large voting block in his team, he earned an even greater amount of enmity than seen in the previous episode. Youth Pastor Mark, in the lead of the large voting block which determined Nancy's exit, wants to save face by choosing to meet in a group to discuss Adrian. Unsurprisingly, Adrian noticed the group dynamics at work and decided clearing the air would take more than a one-on-one discussion. The youngest player on the ranch, Chism, the Youth Pastor Mark's son, was able to redirect the animus by acknowledging Nancy's exit. Two specific team members decided that Nancy's departure was not the most part of their continued conflict.

Mark and Adrian hashed out their underlying disagreement. Adrian acknowledged that the house welcome for Aqua team was cold and the politics of the teams singled him out for disagreement. Roy and Buddy mediated the house meeting for Mark, Adrian and Daphne, Adrian's sister. Mark felt that Adrian's first week on campus should have yielded big weight loss numbers and the aqua team had to be playing the game with his low number on the scale. No resolution resulted from the conversation. It became apparent for Adrian that if his team fell below the yellow line, he will be eliminated. Conda, his team member, explicitly, loudly and repeatedly in excruciating detail stated her desire that he go.

This week's excuse is 'I can't lose weight on my own'. The losing team at this week's challenge will have zero access to their trainer all week. This means no gym time, no emails, and no contact until the Last Chance Workout. The challenge is to keep the trainers (Bob and Dolvett) suspended above a pool of icy-cold water by holding on to a rope which is attached to a 214.5 lbs weight (representing average weight loss on the ranch). The first team whose trainer falls into the water loses the challenge. Red Team loses their strength first, plunging Dolvett into the water. Red team will have to go trainer-free this week.

Dolvett will be monitoring their process, unbeknownst to the red team, in the gym via a hidden camera. He doesn't seem too impressed by Conda's complaints but thinks overall the team started strong in their first workout without him (led by Kim), although tapered off towards the end.

Black Team, meanwhile, are off on a hike with Bob. He informs them a hike with him isn't just a normal hike – he's going to work them super hard. The hike gives single mom, Daphne, the chance to reflect on her two daughters at home, saying she needs to lose weight to set a good example and ensure she is always there for them. She also gets the chance to spend some time with Bob, asking him advice on how to improve her stamina. Bob's is impressed by her attitude. In contrast to Dolvett, Bob explains to the team the difference between Aqua Team Daphne's weight loss and effort paying special attention to this being her week two and the team has been together for six weeks. Daphne isn't complaining and has been able to keep up.

As a treat for their hard work Bob allows the Black Team to go for lunch in a restaurant where their old food demons come back to haunt them. They each reel off what they would normally order, and then learn exactly how many thousands of calories that would entail, getting a lesson in what they should order in future.

Red Team seem stunned by Dolvett's revelation that he's been watching them in the gym. He acknowledges Kim's natural leadership and celebrated her attempt to fill the trainer gap by setting up the training routine for the week. Dolvett was less impressed with the time the group has wasted on team politics. He produces a specific list of Conda's complaints during her training gym time – 13 in total ranging from thoughts on Adrian to thoughts on the exercises. He tells Conda to start focusing on herself.

Back in the gym with the Red Team, Adrian is the next to get a talking to from Dolvett. He thinks that Adrian's biggest obstacle – aside from being shut out by his teammates – is the fact he doesn't listen. At the Last Chance Workout everyone is getting pushed hard, but poor Kim seems to be feeling under pressure about the coming weigh-in. She tells Dolvett that she feels responsibility for whatever happens on the scale because she led the workouts in Dolvett's absence. Red Team's losing the weigh-in eliminates Adrian. Adrian gives his parting thoughts on his treatment during his two weeks on campus. Adrian thanks Roy for his vote in Adrian's favor; however, he points out that the group dynamics were set against him. Mark takes an unusual step after Adrian's elimination in following Adrian out of the elimination room. Adrian lets him know there will be no settlement. In remembrance of the Red Team's embrace of Cassandra after eliminating her grandmother, Adrian says not to bother hugging Daphne or pretending everything is okay.

=== Week 7 ===
First aired February 14, 2012

Alison informed the contestants that one person from each team would have to go home for a week and only their weight would count towards the team's total percentage of weight lost. She then told them that the person going home would be taking their trainer with them. Dolvett chose Conda to return home for the week, while Bob picked Daphne to return home, thinking that she has something to prove for her team. Back at the ranch, Kim once again leads her team without Dolvett, while Bob's team seems a bit unfocused, and they comment on how it doesn't feel right without him. The challenge for the week was the teams would have to squeeze every person on their team underneath a log by digging through sand. The winning team would get letters from home and a 1 lb advantage for the person at home. The Red Team wins.

Later, Dolvett and Conda do their last chance workout. They go to her old high school for the last chance workout. Bob and Daphne's last chance workout is the Willis Tower in Chicago, at 1,450 feet and 103 floors. Bob wants her to finish under 1 hour and uses the Black Team's letters of encouragement to help her. She finishes in 58:14.

At the ranch, Alison informs the teams that whichever team wins the weigh-in gives their at-home teammate another 1 lb advantage. The Black Team's numbers are just so-so. The Red Team's numbers are much better, with Kim and Mark losing nineteen pounds, giving Conda a two-pound advantage. Daphne weighs in first and loses a whopping twelve pounds.

Conda needs to lose more than ten to win, and she loses ten even, giving the Black Team their third win in a row. The red team boots Roy out.

=== Week 8 ===
First aired February 21, 2012

The week began with Buddy's birthday and a temptation, with whoever eating the most total calories winning a special solo power. This solo power lets the winner switch the teams to their liking. Daphne ate the most calories and switched only two people: Jeremy from Black to Red Team; Conda from Red to Black Team.

As with Adrian, Conda continued to air her reservations about Aqua team member, Daphne, especially since the temptation team switch. Daphne chose not to reveal her secret change.

Later that week was their first reward challenge after the team switch. Teams had to maneuver 3x3 blocks to make The Biggest Loser logo. One person in each team were allowed to guide their teammates using a bird's eye view monitor. The red team triumphed quickly, winning themselves a two-week stay at The Biggest Loser Resort.

The tension of the anonymous team switcher became more dramatic as the week wrapped up. Taking Bob's advice, Daphne confirmed that she switched Jeremy and Conda. Conda chose to get rid of Daphne after succeeding in eliminating Adrian. She conspired with three other Black Team members by throwing the weigh-in. When confronted about the lack of weight loss and one weight gain, they continued to lie. The Red Team had big leading win for the week.

Everyone in the Black Team except for Chris (like her husband stood with Adrian) voted Daphne off. As it stands at this broadcast, Daphne has lost 71 pounds.

=== Week 9 ===
First aired February 28, 2012

The contestants go home for 18 days. The contestants are told they each need to lose 5% of their body weight to have immunity at the weigh-in. While Kimmy, Buddy and Jeremy met their goal for the red team, Mark and Kim failed to lose 5% of their body mass. On the black team, the women all lost their 5%. Chism got on the scale and was told that he needed to lose 12 pounds for his team to win the weigh-in and send the red team into elimination (his 5% goal was 15 pounds), but that failing to lose 12 pounds would cause black team to lose the weigh-in. Chism lost 11 pounds and was the only player on the black team without immunity; he was automatically eliminated. Also, at home, there was a rowing challenge that they participated in. The goal was to get to 10,000 meters first, and Chism won. The prize was $10,000.

=== Week 10 ===
First aired March 6, 2012

In the beginning Mark talks to the red Team about losing Chism and they try to comfort him. The next day Alison tells the contestants that they will switch trainers for one week to get them out of their comfort zone, but it also put Conda and Jeremy back into their comfort zones. Later Alison takes the contestants to a mud pit seems fun. Inside the mud there are weights of different sizes. The point is to get the weights out. Each team has 40 weights. Whichever team gets them all out first wins a 2-pound advantage. The red team ended up winning, giving them a 2-pound advantage. Later Conda tells Buddy about Cassandra, Kim, and Emily approaching her last night, and the girls, except for Conda, wanted an all-girl finale. Then Buddy told Mark and Jeremy about it. At the weigh-in everyone threw down small numbers, but the red team won. Emily was the biggest loser, so she had immunity, making the red team end up sending home Cassandra because she was a threat. Since then she has lost 81 pounds and has gone to New York City to get a job. After the finale she will move to New York.

=== Week 11 ===
First aired March 13, 2012

90 minute episode, due to the premiere of Fashion Star airing at 9:30

This week's excuse: "I don't believe in myself." This week the teams disbanded; each person competed as an individual. In the challenge, there was a tug of war. Jeremy won first place and opened a shopping spree with a celebrity but took his sister Conda's prize of a goldfish and gave her the shopping spree.

Conda took Kim on the shopping spree with a celebrity because they both are single parents. They shopped at Jessica Simpson's LA showroom. Emily, with her weight training background, was helping Bob with his weight lifting form. Bob wanted to help Emily gain self-confidence and thought the role swap would help.

Emily and Kimmy "fell below the yellow line" and Emilly was eliminated because she was a bigger threat. She met with former Biggest Loser winner, Olivia, an opera singer and met with Giovanni Rigoli, world-renowned vocal coach and conductor.

=== Week 12 ===
First aired March 20, 2012

This week's excuse: "I can't lose weight on vacation." They tested that excuse by going to Hawaii for the week. The next day, Bethany Hamilton taught them how to surf. Then, in turn, Dolvett learns, too. There was a challenge to see if the contestants could answer multiple-choice questions about food. The tiebreaker question (between Kim and Chris) asked them how many calories 24 chocolate-covered macadamia nuts have in them: Kim guessed 518, and Chris guessed 1260! The right answer was 1320, giving Chris a 1-pound advantage. In the next challenge, players had to run up and down a hill (with the exception of Buddy, who wasn't medically cleared for this challenge) gathering blue leis and putting them on other people's tikis. When a player's tiki had 10 leis, they were out. There was also the black "death lei" that automatically eliminated a player from the challenge. Kimmy found the "death lei" and used it to get Kim out. Conda only had 9 leis, so she won the treasured prize: immunity. Mark tells Kim that he would not put her name up, and Kim feels nice that she has a friend. Kimmy and Megan fell below the yellow line, and the players chose to give Kimmy the boot after she pleaded to keep Megan at the ranch.

=== Week 13 ===
First aired March 27, 2012

Bob has a sit-down talk with Megan, while Conda and Chris listen in. He tells them that she has the lowest percentage of weight loss of everyone in the house, and has got to step up their game. She tells Bob she doesn't know how to motivate herself. She tells us she feels like it is because she has no self-worth. Bob asks her to keep a video diary to see some commitment and accomplishment in herself.

Meanwhile, Dolvett welcomes his team which is Kim, Buddy, Jeremy, and Mark downtown for a Zumba workout. Bob has taken his team out to ride bikes. Conda stays behind the others. Megan stays way out front, with Bob calling out encouragement as they near the top of the hill. Chris and Conda struggle to make it to the top of the hill, Megan never slows down or stops until they reach the top.

Later that evening, Dolvett has a chat with Jeremy who talks about how he held everything inside when his parents divorced over his dad's addiction. He says he was embarrassed and ashamed and didn't tell any of his closest friends. They talk about addictive personalities. Dolvett talks to him about how talking about it helps the healing begin and not to hide it anymore.

At the weigh-in, the biggest loser is Kim, with a 7-pound weight loss, or 4.09%. She wins $7,000. Mark shockingly pulls out a 0% weight lost, but with a one-pound advantage brings him to a 0.5% of weight lost, which obviously is still not enough to stay above the yellow line. Megan and Mark are below the yellow line and up for elimination. At the elimination, Jeremy, Conda, and Chris vote for Megan.

Megan goes home and loses 2 more pounds. Her boyfriend proposes; she plans to get married in September 2013 and has asked Conda to be a bridesmaid.

=== Week 14, Part 1 ===
First aired April 3, 2012

From Week 14 onwards due to The Voice results shows, the remaining episodes are split into two, one-hour installments. Therefore, the elimination will be featured in the following episode.

This week, the remaining contestants competed for a one-pound advantage. It was also important to not come in last, as the contestant in last place earned a one-pound disadvantage. Contestants had to slingshot baseballs into glass windows. Buddy won his first reward challenge and won the one pound advantage, while Conda came in last and earned the one pound disadvantage. After the challenge, Allison revealed that it was makeover week. The twist to makeover week is that it will be held in the White House with First Lady Michelle Obama. The makeover involved new clothes with Jeannie Mai and a new hairstyle with Ken Paves. Before the contestants got the new clothes, Jeannie Mai had them where their old clothes before they started the show and none of the clothes fit. Chris got her hair dyed and highlighted brown, which Bob said made her look younger than her age. Buddy, Jeremy, and Mark all shaved. Kim had her hair trimmed and curled, and Conda got her hair cut and dyed lighter. One more surprise is revealed; the contestants' families are at the White House, as well as the trainers.

=== Week 14, Part 2 ===
First aired April 10, 2012

In the next part of makeover week, Mrs. Obama talks about childhood obesity and the "Let's Move" fitness campaign. Bob is inspired by this idea. Later at the hotel Chris calls to check on Roy, and Roy says he misses Chris a lot, which leads Chris to have a breakdown. During the last chance workout Chris tells Bob about Roy and her breakdown, and Bob tells her to stay focused and work because he doesn't want her to go back to how she was. At the weigh in Kim and Chris fall below the yellow line, with Kim losing only two pounds, and Chris gaining two. Though the alliance had originally planned to eliminate Kim, they decide to send Chris home instead. Chris is now back with her family, riding bikes and singing. She has lost 84 pounds.

=== Semi-finals, Part 1 ===
First aired April 17, 2012

In keeping with the tone and tenor which had been set by the contestants in previous challenges, the remaining contestants threatened to leave the ranch. After finding out behind production that one eliminated contestant would come back for the hopes of being one of the finalists, the contestants decided fairness demanded no previously eliminated contestant be returned.

Production staff lawyer explained the contract the contestants signed detailed that an eliminated contestant was an understood condition to becoming a member of the show and asked them to reconsider the contestants' stay. Mark and Buddy quit the competition. The final three is Kim, and the preserved green team: Conda and Jeremy. The contestants throughout the week battled it out to lose the highest percentage of weight. The winner would win a 2013 model Ford Escape SUV.

At the end of the week, the final three look back at their weight-loss journey. Later, the weigh-in occurred and due to only three contestants, one would automatically be eliminated via the red line. Kim lost the highest percentage, therefore either Conda or Jeremy would be eliminated. Jeremy lost the least percentage but it wasn't a goodbye yet. The fourteen previously eliminated contestants (excluding quitters Joe, Mark and Buddy) walked in the door to meet the final three, with one of them earning themselves a chance to return to the game and become an automatic finalist.

Note: Tough Mudder was supposed to be a challenge airing on the Week 15 episode, but was removed due to the turn of dramatic events in the ranch that week. However, the challenge is available for viewing online at the NBC website.

=== Semi-finals, Part 2 ===
First aired April 24, 2012

At the final three weigh in, Jeremy Britt, who fell below the red line didn't leave just yet. The fourteen eliminated contestants return to the ranch for a second chance spot in the game, ultimately earning themselves a spot as a finalist. One more obstacle blocks them from the finalist spot, a four-part challenge. The winner will earn them the third finalist spot, alongside Kim Nielsen and Conda Britt.

Round 1 of the finalist challenge was the weigh-in. The fifteen eliminated contestants weighed in by the order of their elimination, from most to least recent. The top eight eliminated contestants with the most percentage of weight loss would advance to Round 2. In order of percentages, Jeremy, Cassandra, Emily, Mike, Chris, Lauren, Kimmy and Megan all advanced respectively. This meant that Ben, Gail, Nancy, Adrian, Roy, Daphne and Chism were eliminated.

Round 2 of the finalist challenge was a 100-yard dash. It was the same challenge in the beginning of the season where the contestants had to run a 40-yard dash. The first five to finish the dash would advance to Round 3. Chris automatically lost the challenge for medical reasons. Emily and Kimmy were the last placers and were eliminated.

Round 3 of the finalist challenge was a calorie puzzle. Each row of the puzzle had a calorie number and each weight had a specific food that matched to each row. The fastest three to successfully complete the puzzle will advance to the fourth and final round. Mike, Jeremy and Lauren finished, leaving Cassandra and Megan to be eliminated. Mike and Lauren successfully redeemed themselves to Round 4 as the underdogs, being eliminated the 2nd and 3rd weeks respectively.

The final Round 4 was an endurance challenge to keep holding on to power. The contestants had to hold on a golden finalist ticket hanging while standing on a platform. The last to keep their hands on the ticket earns the final finalist spot. Jeremy's strategy was to distract for two hours straight, while Mike and Lauren held quietly. After two hours, the contestants had to let go of one hand and one foot. Lauren felt nauseous into the 2nd hour and dropped out. Later, Mike dropped out from imbalance, therefore Jeremy redeemed himself yet again and redeemed his finalist spot again. The finalists for No Excuses are Kim Nielsen, and the brother/sister duo of Conda and Jeremy Britt. This is also the second time that a couple has made to the finale together.

=== Week 16 (Finale) ===
First aired May 1, 2012

The live finale aired May 1, the shortest spring season to air since season five. Joe, Mark, and Buddy did not attend the finale.

Conda, Jeremy, and Kim met up one final time on the scale to see who will be the season's Biggest Loser and win $250,000. Furthermore, at-home contestants will find out who among themselves will win the $100,000. Emily lead for most of the time, beating Cassandra by a mere 0.15%. The last person who weighed in was Mike Messina, who was eliminated the second week. He reigned supreme by losing the highest percentage of weight loss of 44.69%, winning to Emily's weight loss of 38.64%.

Conda weighed first, losing 39.12% of her body weight. Jeremy weighed after his sister, losing a staggering 51.16%. Lastly, Kim went on the scale, and said Jeremy and herself were already winners. She had the weight lost of 46.83%, and Jeremy is declared the winner of the prestigious title of The Biggest Loser.
