= Michael Joseph Green =

Catholic bishop

His Excellency, The Most Reverend Michael Joseph Green
- Bishop of Reno; Titular Bishop of Trisipa
- Predecessor: Robert Joseph Dwyer
- Successor: Norman Francis McFarland
- Previous post: Auxiliary Bishop of Lansing (1962 to 1967)

Orders
- Ordination: July 14, 1946 by Joseph H. Albers
- Consecration: August 28, 1962 by Joseph H. Albers

Personal details
- Born: October 13, 1917 St. Joseph, Michigan, US
- Died: August 30, 1982 (aged 64) Pontiac, Michigan, US
- Denomination: Roman Catholic Church
- Education: Pontifical Lateran University
- Motto: Fiat voluntas tua (Thy will be done)

Michael Joseph Green (October 13, 1917 – August 30, 1982) was a 20th-century bishop of the Catholic Church in the United States. He served as the third bishop of the Diocese of Reno in Nevada from 1967 to 1974. He previously served as auxiliary bishop of the Diocese of Lansing in Michigan from 1962 to 1967.

== Biography ==
=== Early life and priesthood ===
Michael Green was born on October 13, 1917, in St. Joseph, Michigan.He was ordained a priest by Bishop Joseph H. Albers for the Diocese of Lansing at St. Joseph's Church in St. Joseph on July 14, 1946. After his ordination, the diocese assigned Green as secretary and notary to its tribunal. He went to Rome in 1951 to study canon law at the Pontifical Lateran University. Green received a Doctor of Canon Law degree summa cum laude in 1954.

After Green returned to Lansing, Albers appointed him as his private secretary. He was named chancellor of the diocese and pastor of St. Joseph's in 1957. The Vatican in 1959 elevated Green to the rank of domestic prelate.

=== Auxiliary Bishop of Lansing ===
On June 22, 1962, Pope John XXIII named Green as titular bishop of Trisipa and auxiliary bishop of Lansing. He was consecrated a bishop at St. Mary's Cathedral in Lansing, Michigan, on August 28, 1962, by Bishop Joseph H. Albers. The co-consecrators were Bishops Clarence George Issenmann and Charles Salatka. From 1962 to 1965, Green attended all four sessions of the Second Vatican Council in Rome.

=== Bishop of Reno ===
On March 11, 1967, Pope Paul VI named Green as the third bishop of Reno. He served the diocese for seven years until his resignation was accepted by Paul VI on December 6, 1974. After his retirement, Green returned to Lansing to serve as pastor of St. Joseph Church in Adrian, Michigan. Green died on August 30, 1982, in Pontiac, Michigan.

Catholic Church titles
Preceded by Robert Joseph Dwyer	Bishop of Reno; 1967–1974	Succeeded by Norman Francis McFarland
