= Thomas Kiely Gorman =

American Catholic prelate (1892–1980)

His Excellency, The Most Reverend Thomas Kiely Gorman
- Bishop of Dallas
- Church: Catholic Church; Latin Church
- Province: San Antonio
- Diocese: Dallas
- Installed: August 19, 1954
- Retired: August 22, 1969
- Predecessor: Joseph Patrick Lynch
- Successor: Thomas Ambrose Tschoepe
- Other posts: Titular Bishop of Pinhel (1969‍–‍1971); Bishop Emeritus of Dallas (1971‍–‍1980)
- Previous posts: Bishop of Reno (1931‍–‍1952); Coadjutor Bishop of Dallas (1952‍–‍1954); Titular Bishop of Rhasus (1952‍–‍1954)

Orders
- Ordination: June 23, 1917 by Daniel Francis Feehan
- Consecration: July 22, 1931 by John Joseph Cantwell

Personal details
- Born: August 30, 1892 Pasadena, California, US
- Died: August 16, 1980 (aged 87) Dallas, Texas, US
- Education: St. Patrick's Seminary; St. Mary's Seminary and University; Catholic University of America; Catholic University of Louvain
- Motto: In caritate crescamus (Let us grow in charity)

Ordination history
History
Priestly ordination
- Ordained by: Daniel Francis Feehan
- Date: June 23, 1917
Episcopal consecration
- Principal consecrator: John Joseph Cantwell
- Co-consecrators: John Joseph Mitty, Robert John Armstrong
- Date: July 22, 1931
- Place: Los Angeles
Episcopal succession
Bishops consecrated by Thomas Kiely Gorman as principal consecrator
- Lawrence Michael De Falco: 1963
- Thomas Ambrose Tschoepe: 1966
- John Joseph Cassata: 1968
- Source(s): Catholic-Hierarchy.org; Inventory of the Church Archives of Nevada

Thomas Kiely Gorman (August 30, 1892 – August 16, 1980) was an American prelate of the Catholic Church. He served as the first bishop of the new Diocese of Reno in Nevada from 1931 to 1952 and as the fourth bishop of the Diocese of Dallas in Texas from 1954 to 1969.

== Early life ==
Thomas Gorman was born on August 30, 1892, in Pasadena, California, to John Joseph and Mary Elizabeth (née Kiely) Gorman. He entered St. Patrick's Seminary in Menlo Park in 1910, shortly before his father's death. He was transferred to St. Mary's Seminary, Baltimore, Maryland in 1914.

== Priesthood ==
Gorman was ordained to the priesthood by Bishop Daniel Francis Feehan for the Diocese of Monterey-Los Angeles on June 23, 1917. After his ordination, he went to Washington, D.C. to study at Catholic University of America for a year. Gorman returned to California to perform and did pastoral work in the diocese until 1922. Gorman then traveled to Leuven, Belgium to attend the Catholic University of Louvain, graduating in 1925 with a Doctor of History degree. He returned to Los Angeles to become editor of Tidings, a diocesan newspaper in 1926.

== Bishop of Reno ==
On April 24, 1931, Gorman was appointed the first bishop of the new Diocese of Reno by Pope Pius XI. He received his episcopal consecration on July 22, 1931, in Los Angeles at St. Vibiana Cathedral from Archbishop John Cantwell, with Bishops John Mitty and Robert Armstrong serving as co-consecrators. Gorman installed as bishop on August 19, 1931, at Saint Thomas Aquinas Cathedral in Reno, Nevada.

Under Gorman, the diocese opened soup kitchens and homeless shelters in Reno in the 1930s as a response to the Great Depression. During World War II, he created United Service Organizations (USO) centers for soldiers on leave, African-American wartime workers and residents in Boulder City, Nevada.

== Coadjutor Bishop and Bishop of Dallas ==
Gorman was named coadjutor bishop by Pope Pius XII of Dallas and titular bishop of Rhasus on February 8, 1952. He automatically succeeded Bishop Joseph Lynch as the fourth bishop of Dallas upon the latter's death on August 29, 1954. Gorman attended the four sessions of the Second Vatican Council in Rome from 1962 to 1965.

Despite his original support for their ecumenical work, Gorman relieved four Texan Paulist priests of their duties in 1967 for purportedly neglecting their responsibility of servicing the Newman Clubs at local colleges. His decision met widespread opposition, but he refused to reverse it.

== Retirement and legacy ==
On August 22, 1969, Pope Paul VI accepted Gorman's resignation as bishop of Dallas and named him titular bishop of Pinhel; he resigned from that title on January 21, 1971.

Thomas Gorman died in Dallas on August 16, 1980, at age 87. Bishop Gorman High School in Las Vegas, Nevada, and Bishop Thomas K. Gorman Catholic School in Tyler, Texas, are named for him.

== Published works ==
- Gorman, Thomas K. (1925). America and Belgium, a Study of the Influence of the United States Upon the Belgian Revolution of 1789–90. London: T. Fisher Unwin, Ltd., Adelphi Terrace.
- Gorman, Most Rev. Thomas K. (1935). Seventy-Five Years of Catholic Life in Nevada. Reno, Nev.: Journal Press.

== Sources ==
- Nevada Historical Records Survey Project (1939). Inventory of the Church Archives of Nevada. Vol. 2. Historical Records Survey.

Catholic Church titles
Preceded by Joseph Patrick Lynch	Bishop of Dallas; 1954–1969	Succeeded by Thomas Ambrose Tschoepe
Preceded by None	Bishop of Reno; 1931–1952	Succeeded by Robert Joseph Dwyer
