= Saint Thomas Aquinas Cathedral =

Historic church in Nevada, United States

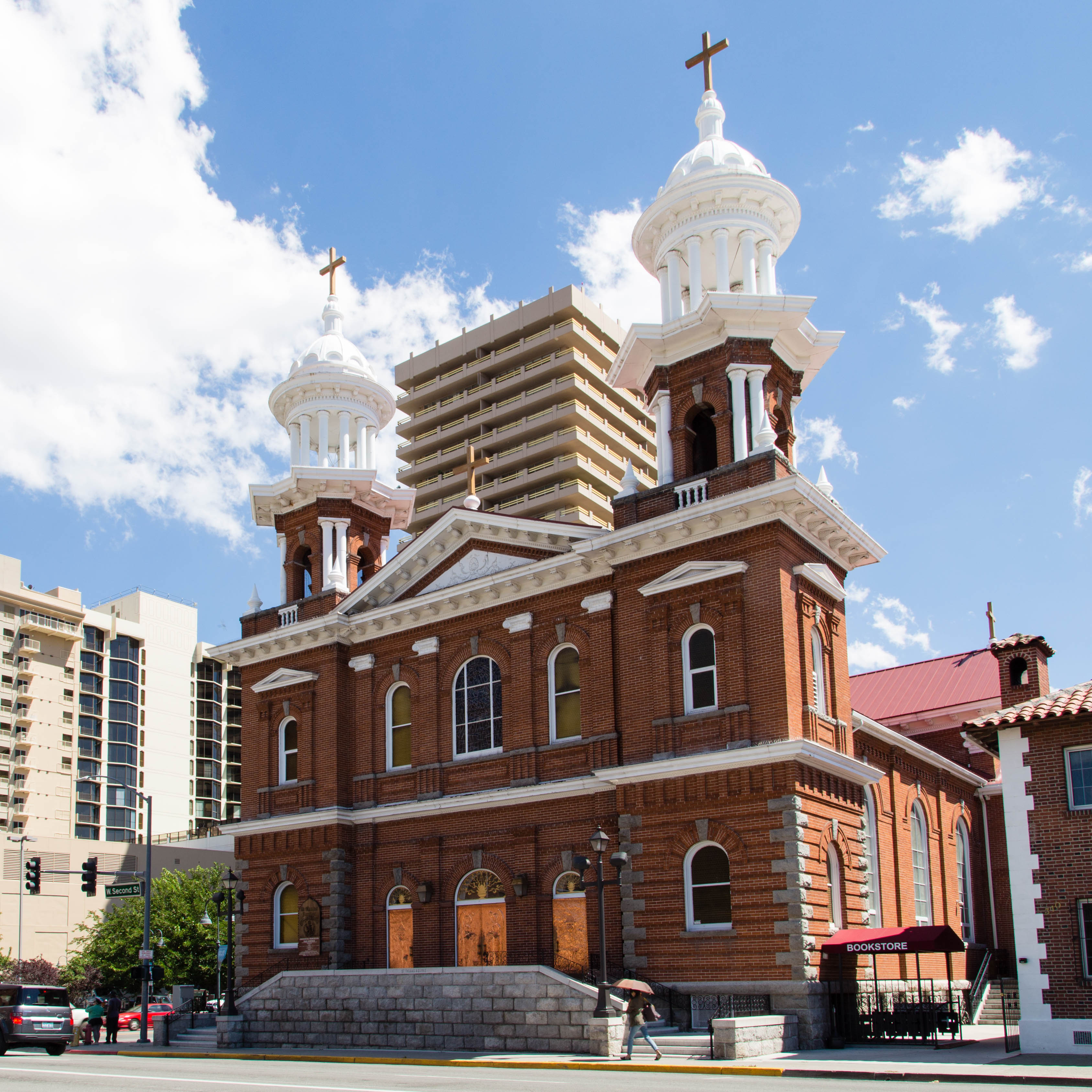

- Location in Nevada Saint Thomas Aquinas Cathedral (the United States)
- 39°31′33″N 119°49′03″W
- Location: 310 W. 2nd St. Reno, Nevada
- Country: United States
- Denomination: Roman Catholic Church
- Website: stacathedral.com

History
- Founded: 1907
- Dedication: Thomas Aquinas
- Consecrated: 1908

Architecture
- Style: Neoclassical
- Groundbreaking: 1906
- Completed: 1908

Administration
- Diocese: Reno

Clergy
- Bishop: Daniel Henry Mueggenborg
- Rector: Charles (Chuck) Durante
- Priest: Francis Coyne
- St. Thomas Aquinas Cathedral Complex
- U.S. National Register of Historic Places
- Architect: Frederick J. DeLongchamps (rectory and school)
- MPS: Architecture of Frederick J. DeLongchamps TR
- NRHP reference No.: 100007430
- Added to NRHP: February 17, 2022

Saint Thomas Aquinas Cathedral is the mother church of the Roman Catholic Diocese of Reno, Nevada, United States. It is located at 310 W. 2nd Street in Reno. It was built in 1908 as the rise in Reno's Catholic population warranted a larger church. The cathedral was nearly destroyed by a fire in 1909 and was restored the following year. The cathedral complex was listed on the National Register of Historic Places in 2022.

== History ==
On May 21, 1906, Catholic officials purchased the Sol Levy home at the corner of Second and Chestnut (now Arlington) streets in Reno for $10,000 to be the site of St. Thomas Aquinas Cathedral. The cornerstone was laid in June 1906 and the cathedral was dedicated June 21, 1908. A fire on December 21, 1909, caused major damage, including the collapse of the ceiling, but it was salvaged and reopened in 1910. In 1931, Pope Pius XI appointed the first Bishop of Reno as Thomas Kiely Gorman DD. D.Sc. Hist. which established the Diocese of Reno. The church became known as the cathedral and a bishop's chair was installed, that remains today. A renovation conducted in the 1950s added a wraparound mural that surrounds the altar. In 2010, an expansive retrofit was conducted to stabilize the foundation of the church.

The mural painting which adorns the sanctuary is considered to be one of the finest works of art of its kind in America. The mural was painted by Edith and Isabel Piczek, with the theme being the "Adoration of the Lamb of God, our Lord in the Blessed Eucharist." In the mural, the Saints of the Old Law, to the left, include Abel, Moses, Ruth, Abraham and Isaac, all in the presence of the Manna. Melchisedech, David, Nathan, Malachias, Anna the Prophetess and John the Baptist are also seen to the left of the Lamb of God. The saints of the New Law include Peter and John, with Paul in the background. Augustine of Hippo, Clare of Assisi, Charles Borromeo, Paschal Baylon and Pope Pius X, who urges a modern working family to receive the sacrament of communion.

A variety of Diocesan priests ran the cathedral for years. The Dominican Order lived at the church and ran its programs from 1980 to 1986. From 1986 to June 2018, the Conventual Franciscans (OFM) of the St. Joseph of Cupertino Province also lived at and ran the cathedral.

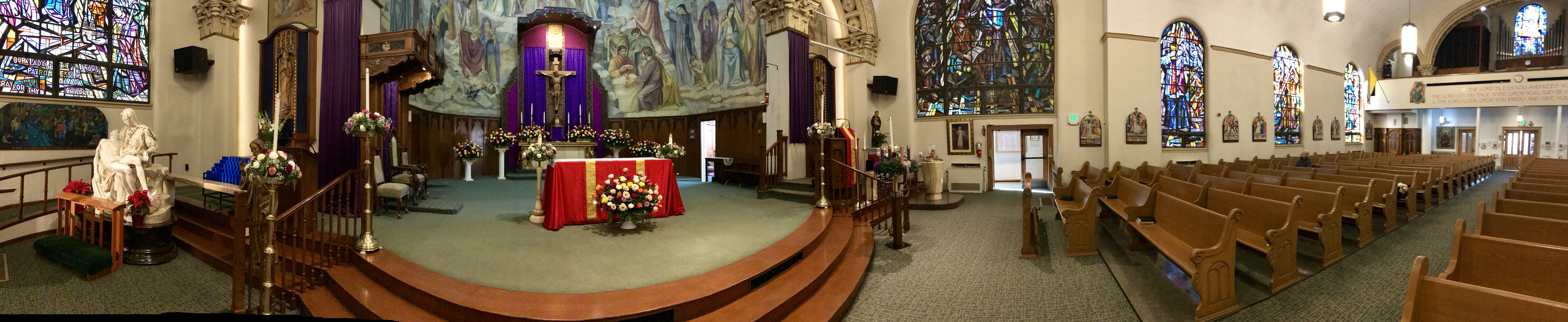
Interior of Saint Thomas Aquinas Cathedral in 2017

On July 1, 2018, Reverend Charles (Chuck) Durante became the Rector of the Saint Thomas Aquinas Cathedral. The liturgical and canonical seat belonged to Bishop Randolph Calvo, DD, JCD, who appointed Fr. Durante, to return to the cathedral where he, as a youth received his first communion and confirmation. When Fr. Chuck became a new priest, he said his first mass at the cathedral. It was his home parish for over 35 years before he was assigned to be the new rector. Fr. Francis Coyne is the parochial vicar.

== Gallery ==
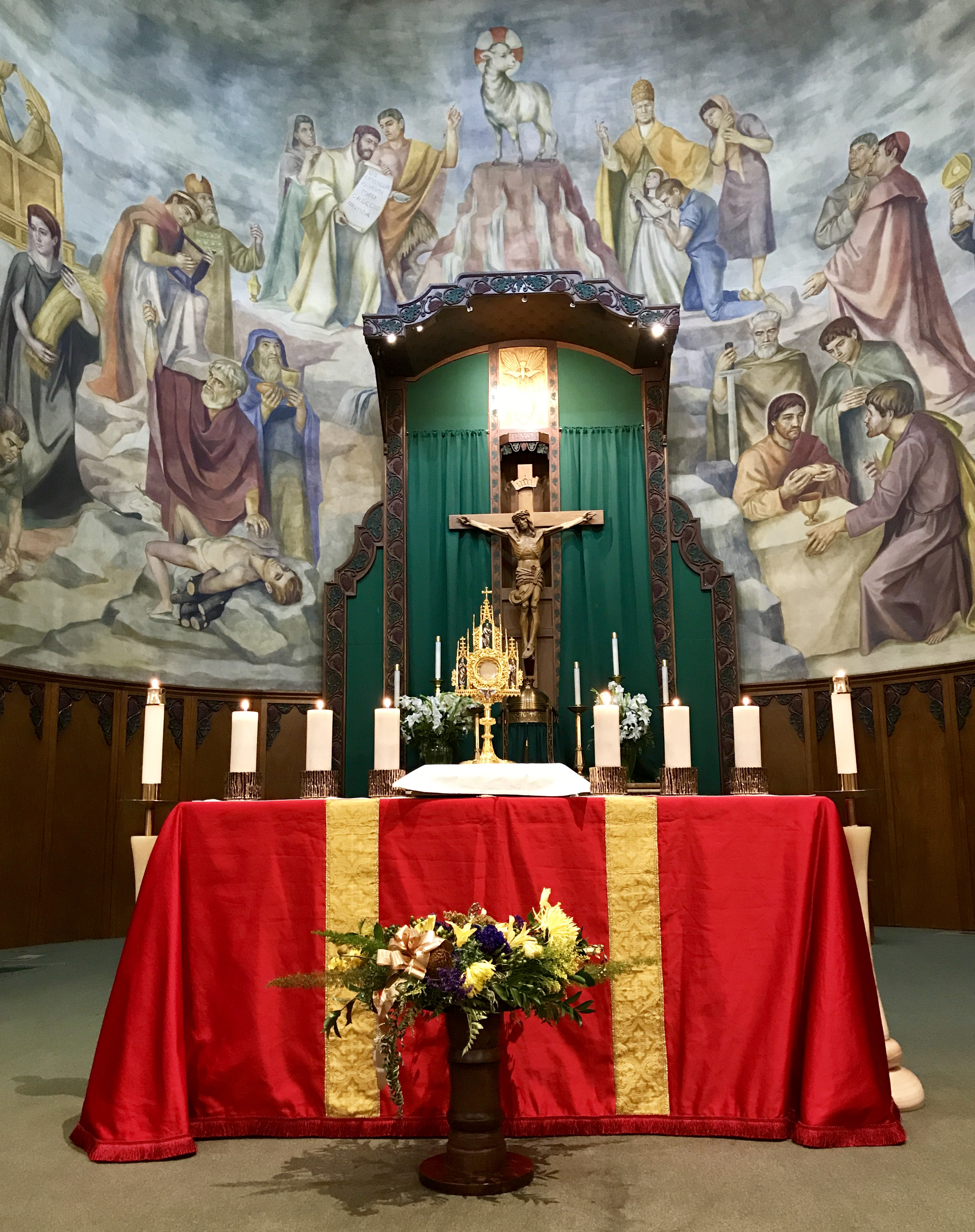
Eucharistic Adoration

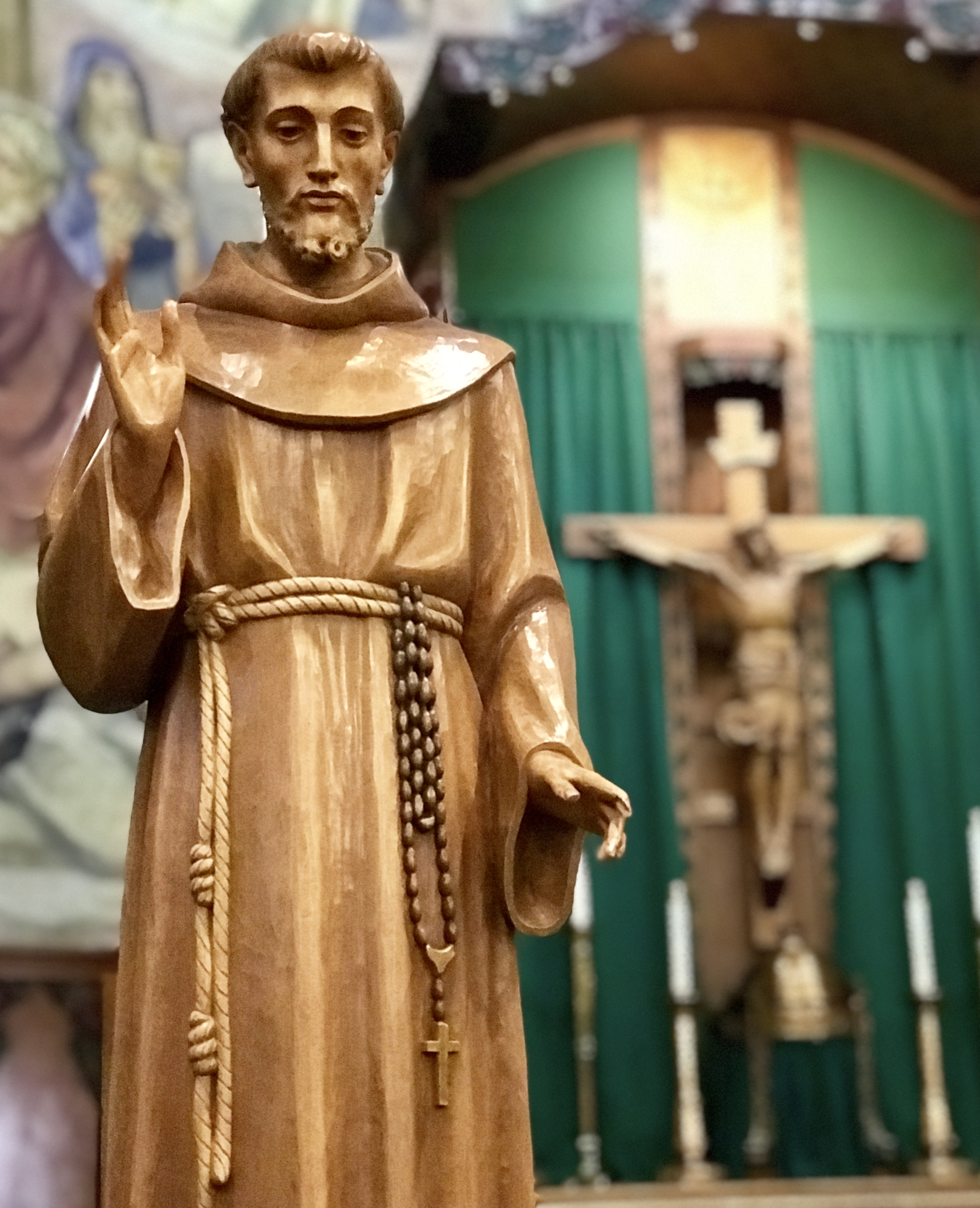
Statue of St. Francis of Assisi

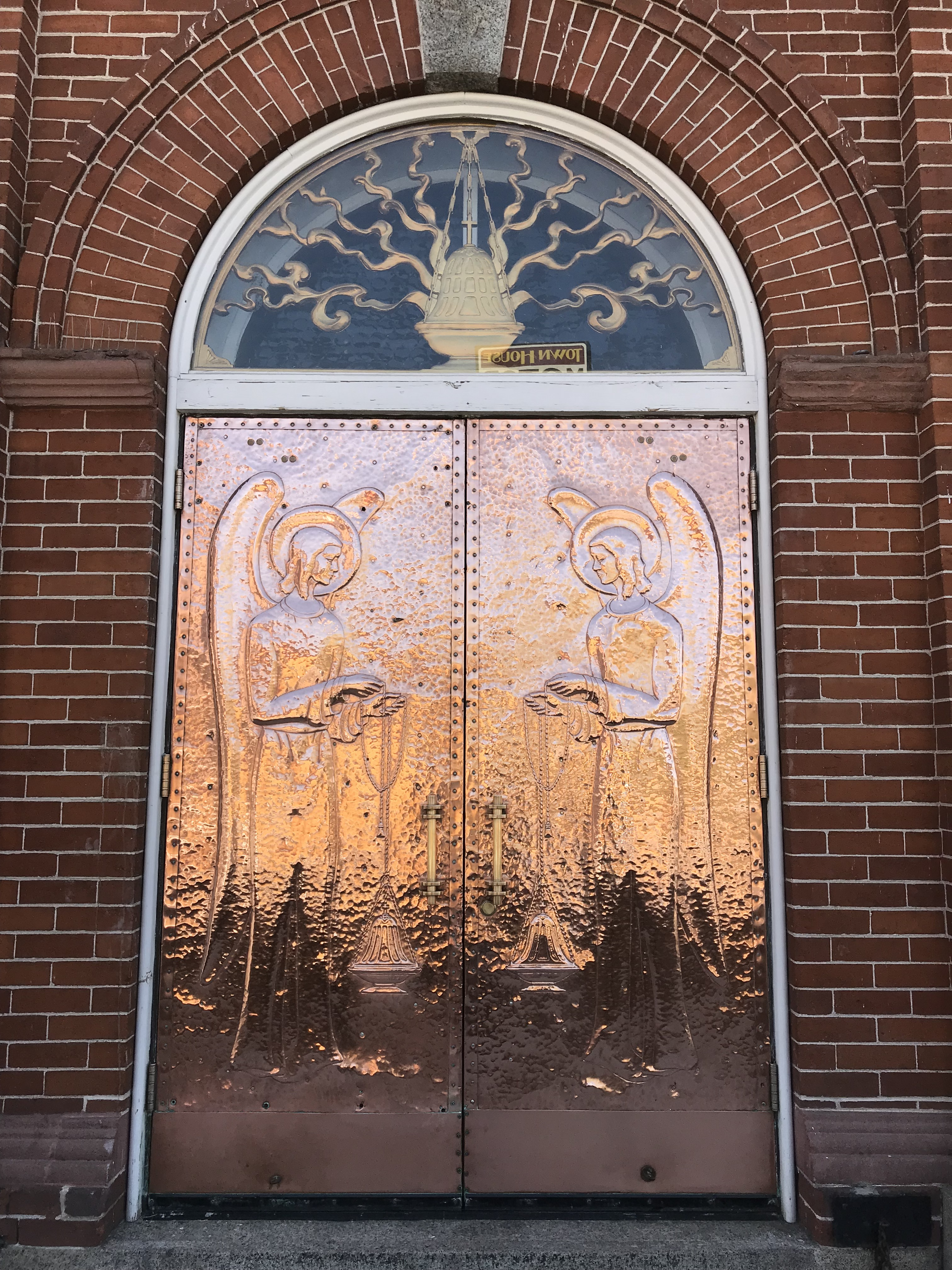
The copper front door

== See also ==
- List of Catholic cathedrals in the United States
- List of cathedrals in the United States
- Sacred Heart Basilica, Timaru, New Zealand
