= Saint Luke Institute =

Mental health education and treatment facility in Silver Spring, Maryland

Coordinates: 39°0′10″N 76°58′49″W

- Founded: 1977
- Founded at: Suitland, Maryland
- Type: NGO, 501(c)(3)
- Headquarters: Silver Spring, Maryland
- Location: Silver Spring, Maryland
- Region served: United States and International
- President and CEO: Rev. Patrick McDevitt, CM, Ph.D.
- Affiliations: Caritas Counseling Center, Baltimore, Maryland; Saint Luke Center, Louisville, Kentucky; St. Luke's Centre, Manchester, England
- Website: http://www.sli.org

Saint Luke Institute (SLI) is a U.S.-based private, licensed mental health education and treatment facility that is based in Silver Spring, Maryland. The independent center treats the mental health and spiritual health needs of Catholic priests, permanent deacons, and consecrated men and women religious; offers online and in-person education on healthy life and ministry for clergy, religious and lay ministers and leaders; and provides candidate assessments for vocations.

== History ==
SLI was founded in 1981 by Michael Peterson, a priest with training as a psychiatrist from the University of California, San Francisco to treat priests with drug or alcohol addiction. In 1983, SLI began to expand treatment beyond substance abuse. It was a pioneer in identifying and treating child sexual abuse to reduce recidivism. This coincided with the emergence of the case of Gilbert Gauthe, a Louisiana priest convicted of child sexual abuse. Following Peterson's death, Robert E. Bacher, who had served as executive secretary of the United States Conference of Catholic Bishops’ Committee on Priestly Formation, led SLI from 1987 to 1992.

In 1992, Canice Connors was appointed as the third president of SLI. A psychologist, Connors was the former president of Southdown, a Catholic treatment center near Toronto. Connors described himself as a victim of child abuse by an older man.

In the early 1990s, SLI had up to 32 inpatients and about 12 patients residing at houses owned by SLI. SLI followed standard treatment protocols for its clients, including treatment of sexual issues. The center also provided individual and group therapy aimed at helping priests practice healthy celibacy; the latter differed from secular treatment, in which the effort was to get the men to transfer their sexual attraction to adults.

After a person left treatment, the bishop or religious superior would determine what, if any ministry, the person would be assigned to, with input from treatment outcomes. As of 1994 SLI had treated 137 priests, of which 60 had returned to ministry and 77 became inactive. Of the inactive priests, 20 were convicted of crimes and sent to prison and others laicized.

In 1993, SLI added a residential program for women religious and was treating a range of behavioral health needs for men and women, such as anxiety, depression, boundaries and interpersonal issues. In 1994, SLI added a transitional, post-residential program called Halfway House.

From 1996 to 2009 (and from 2013 to 2014), Stephen J. Rossetti, a psychologist, served as SLI president. Rossetti first began working at SLI in 1993, and became executive vice president and chief operating officer.

In 1997, SLI began publishing LukeNotes, a free newsletter that explained mental health issues and treatment through in-depth articles and case studies. In 2000, SLI opened outpatient counseling for clergy, religious and lay people and in 2005, opened St. Luke's Centre in Manchester, England. In 2008, SLI set up the Saint Luke Institute Foundation, Inc. and transferred about $3.5 million into it to provide long-term financial support for SLI.

Rossetti stepped down as SLI's president in October 2009 to join the faculty of The Catholic University of America. He was succeeded by Edward J. Arsenault of the Diocese of Manchester in New Hampshire. Arsenault was removed as SLI's president in 2013 after being accused of stealing money from the Diocese of Manchester and the estate of a deceased priest, prior to and unrelated to SLI. He was also accused of billing a hospital for consulting work he never performed. He pleaded guilty in 2014 and was sentenced.

At that time Rossetti returned as president of SLI. Sheila Harron, Ph.D., was named CEO. David Songy, a psychologist from Denver, became president on January 1, 2015.

In 2011, SLI opened Saint Luke Center in Louisville, Ky., to provide candidate assessments for priesthood and religious life, education, outpatient counseling and spiritual direction. In 2012, SLI opened Caritas Counseling Center, near Towson, Md., for outpatient therapy and spiritual direction.

In June 2013, SLI purchased the St. Louis Consultation Center, which provided intensive outpatient psychological and spiritual treatment, education and candidate assessments. In 2023, Rev. James Garvey, O.Praem., D.Min. became president. In 2024, Garvey was called back by his Norbertine community and Rev. Quinn Conners, O.Carm, Ph.D., became Interim President until the appointment of Rev. Patrick McDevitt, CM, Ph.D., announced on July 14, 2025.

== Today ==
The St. Louis program was moved to Silver Spring, Md., in 2021 as SLI transitioned from residential care to an intensive outpatient program. SLI also provides outpatient therapy, spiritual direction services, continuing care and national educational programs related to psychological and spiritual health of clergy, men and women religious, lay ministers and other leaders.

Saint Luke Institute is led by Rev. Patrick McDevitt, CM, Ph.D. He is a former college president and professor who taught psychological assessment, psychopathology, and counseling theory. He also was provincial superior for the Vincentians' western province. He was chancellor and director of mission for the Diocese of Belleville before moving to Saint Luke Institute.

Saint Luke Institute is accredited by The Joint Commission and is licensed by the State of Maryland Department of Health.

== See also ==
- Roman Catholic Archdiocese of Washington
- List of hospitals in Maryland
