= Dittmer, Missouri =

Unincorporated community in Missouri, U.S.

Coordinates: 38°20′08″N 90°41′17″W

Dittmer is an unincorporated community in western Jefferson County, Missouri, United States. It is located on Route 30 southwest of Cedar Hill.

The community's namesake is William Dittmer, an early postmaster who established a post office called Dittmer's Store in 1870. An 1891 railroad map calls the community "Dittmer's Store." It was officially named Dittmer in 1899.

Today, Dittmer is home to the Vianney Renewal Center, a treatment center for Catholic clergy with sexual or other disorders.
