= Robert Joseph Dwyer =

American Catholic prelate and historian (born 1908)

His Excellency, The Most Reverend Robert Joseph Dwyer
- Archbishop of Portland in Oregon
- Dwyer in 1951
- Archdiocese: Portland in Oregon
- Appointed: December 9, 1966
- Installed: February 6, 1967
- Term ended: January 22, 1974
- Predecessor: Edward Howard
- Successor: Cornelius Michael Power
- Previous post: Bishop of Reno (1952–1966)

Orders
- Ordination: June 11, 1932 by Edward Kelly
- Consecration: August 5, 1952 by John Joseph Mitty

Personal details
- Born: August 1, 1908 Salt Lake City, Utah, US
- Died: March 24, 1976 (aged 67) Piedmont, California, US
- Denomination: Catholic Church
- Education: St. Patrick's Seminary; Catholic University of America
- Motto: Levate oculos vestros (Latin for 'Lift up your eyes')
- Coat of arms

Robert Joseph Dwyer (August 1, 1908 – March 24, 1976) was an American Catholic prelate who was the fifth archbishop of Portland in Oregon from 1966 to 1974, having previously served as the second bishop of Reno in Nevada from 1952 to 1966.

== Early life and education ==
Dwyer was born on August 1, 1908, in Salt Lake City, Utah, the only child of John Charles and Mabel (née Maynard) Dwyer. His father was of Irish descent, and his mother of French Canadian. He attended Wasatch Public School and Judge Memorial High School in Salt Lake City. In 1925, he enrolled at St. Mary's Manor, the Marist minor seminary in Langhorne, Pennsylvania. Shortly afterwards, he transferred to St. Patrick's Seminary in Menlo Park, California.

== Priesthood ==
On June 11, 1932, Dwyer was ordained to the priesthood for the Diocese of Salt Lake City by Bishop Edward Kelly. He was the first Utah native to be ordained a priest for its diocese. After his ordination, the diocese assigned Dwyer as a curate at the Cathedral of the Madeleine Parish. In 1934, he was appointed as chaplain at the College of Saint Mary-of-the-Wasatch, a girls school in Salt Lake City and editor of The Intermountain Catholic. Dwyer in 1938 went to Washington D. C. to study at the Catholic University of America. He earned a Doctor of Philosophy degree in 1941 with a thesis entitled: "The Gentile Comes to Utah: A Study in Religious and Social Conflict 1862-1890".

Following his return to Utah, Dwyer in 1941 was named as superintendent of schools for the diocese; he also resumed his position as editor of the diocesan newspaper. He was appointed diocesan director of the Society for the Propagation of the Faith in 1942. Bishop Thomas Kiely Gorman appointed Dwyer as rector of the Cathedral of the Madeleine in 1948. The Vatican raised Dwyer to the rank of monsignor in 1950.

== Bishop of Reno ==
Dwyer was appointed the second bishop of Reno on May 19, 1952, by Pope Pius XII. Dwyer was consecrated at Saint Thomas Aquinas Cathedral in Reno, Nevada, by Archbishop John Joseph Mitty on August 5, 1952.

== Archbishop of Portland ==
Pope Paul VI appointed Dwyer as the fifth archbishop of Portland on December 9, 1966. Retiring on January 22, 1974, due to ill health, he died in Piedmont, California on March 24, 1976.

A father of the Second Vatican Council, Dwyer was very disheartened with the 1970 English translation of the Roman Missal by the International Commission on English in the Liturgy and the departure of Latin from the liturgy in the new Mass that was implemented after the council.

== As a historian ==
Dwyer began his work as a historian of the American West at the Catholic University of America, in Washington, D.C. in 1938, receiving his Ph.D. in history in 1941. His dissertation was published as The Gentile Comes to Utah: A Study in Religious and Social Conflict (1862-1890) and is considered an accomplished and objective work on the religious history of early Utah. Dwyer described Mormonism as an attempt to resurrect the idea of creating an ideal human order on earth. Sections of this work addressed the conflicts between the religious stance of Brigham Young, President of the Church of Jesus Christ of Latter-day Saints and the antipolygamy crusade launched by the federal government

Although his work as a historian was secondary to his religious calling, he served as a member of the governing and editorial boards of the Utah State Historical Society in Salt Lake City from 1943 to 1952. Dwyer periodically acted as editor to the Utah Historical Quarterly, and produced two noted volumes. In 1943, he edited work on the diary of Albert Tracy, a soldier in Colonel Albert Sidney Johnston's troops during the Utah War. Dwyer, in 1946, edited a volume on Mormon pioneer Lorenzo Dow Young. It contained a biography of Young by James Amasa Little, an edited diary of Lorenzo Dow Young, and additional information on the pioneer's extensive family.

After he became archbishop, Dwyer became a member of the board of advisors of the Western History Center at the University of Utah in Salt Lake City.

== Publications ==
- The Gentile Comes to Utah: A Study in Religious and Social Conflict (1862-1890). Washington D.C., Catholic University of America Press, 1941, republished in 1971.

Catholic Church titles
| Preceded by Edward Howard | Archbishop of Portland in Oregon; 1966–1974 | Succeeded by Cornelius Michael Power |
| Preceded by Thomas Kiely Gorman | Bishop of Reno; 1952–1966 | Succeeded by Michael Joseph Green |
