= Emmett McLoughlin =

American priest and author (1907–1970)

Emmett McLoughlin (born John Patrick McLoughlin; February 3, 1907 – October 9, 1970) was an American former Catholic priest of the Franciscan order who became known in the 1930s as an advocate for low-income housing in Phoenix, Arizona. He left the priesthood in 1948 in order to remain superintendent of St Monica's (later Phoenix Memorial) Hospital and wrote a number of books, including his autobiography, People's Padre. Time magazine called him "America's best-known ex-priest".

== Biography ==
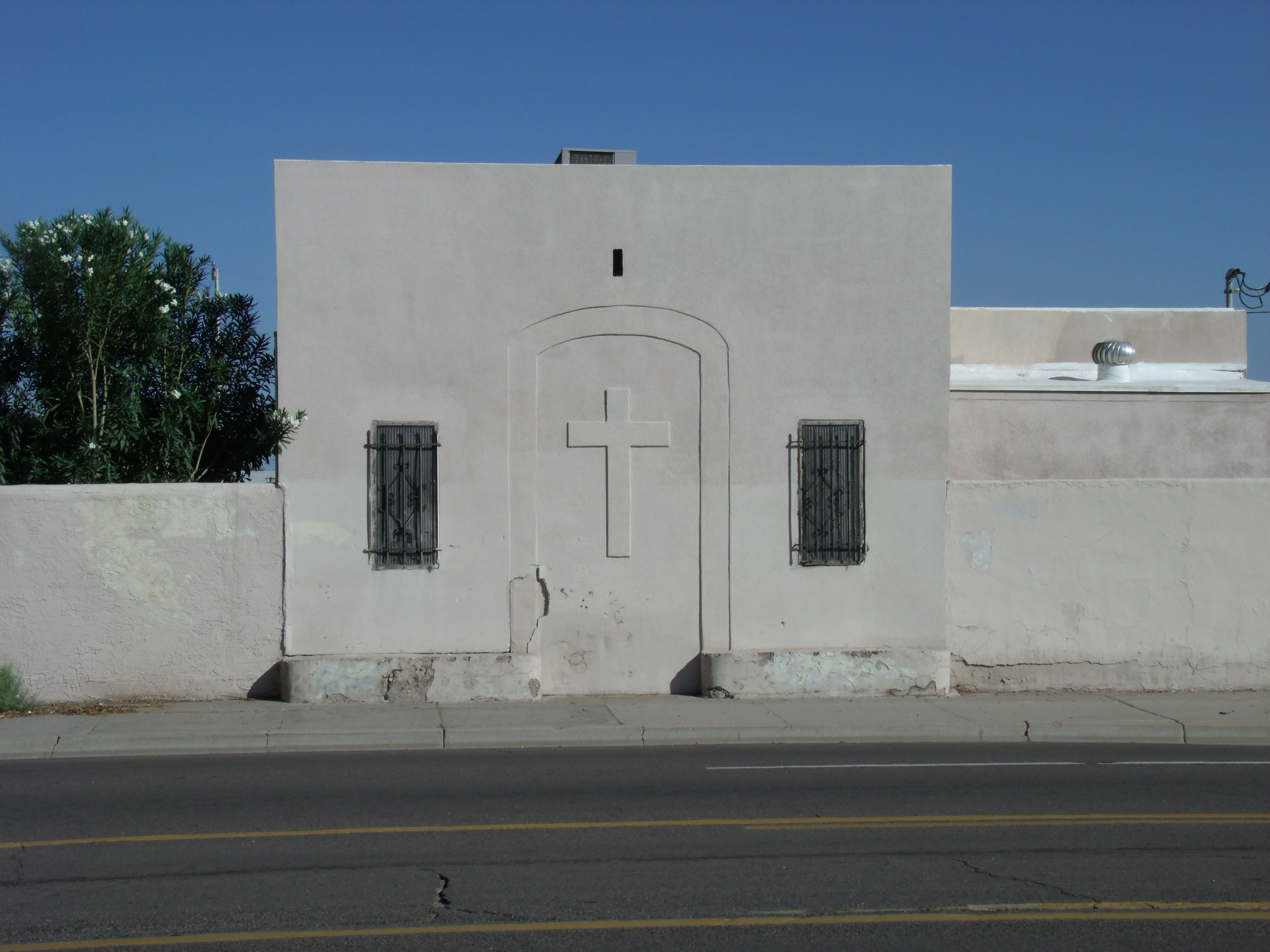
St. Pius X Catholic Church was built in 1935 and is located at 802-815 South 7th Avenue in Phoenix. 815 is the location where Father Emmett McLoughlin established the "Father Emmett Mission" in 1930.

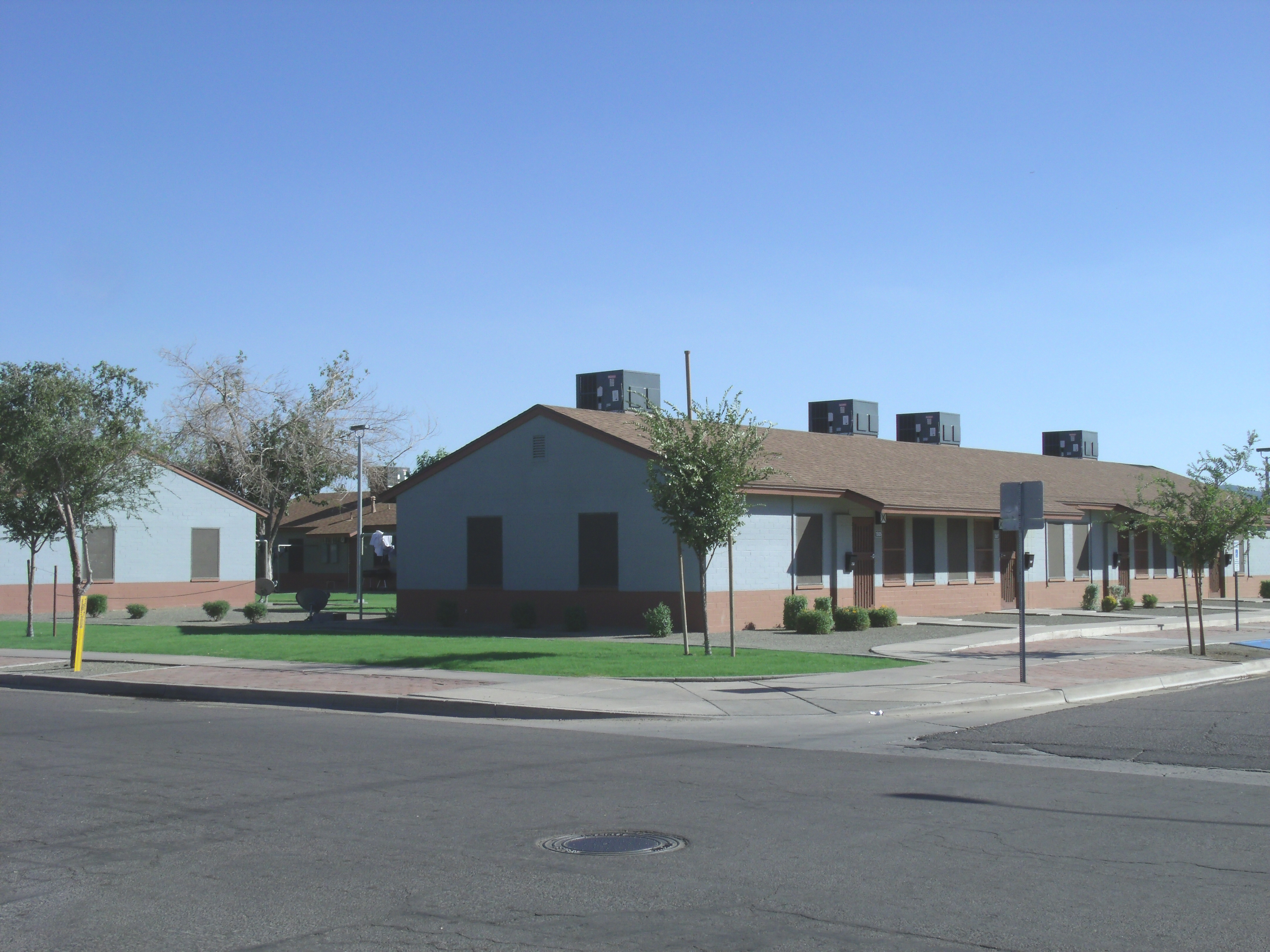
The main office of the Marcos de Niza Housing Project, established by Father Emmett McLoughlin in 1941. The housing project is located at 305 W. Pima St. in Phoenix, Az. This property is recognized as historic by the Hispanic American Historic Property Survey of the City of Phoenix.

McLoughlin grew up in Sacramento, California, and entered St. Anthony's Seminary in Santa Barbara, California. He took the name Emmett during his novitiate in the Franciscan order.

After his ordination in 1933 he was assigned to South Phoenix, a segregated area in Phoenix, Arizona, and began work there that would last for 14 years. He founded St Monica's Catholic Church for African-American and Hispanic residents in the neighborhood, and became known for his activism via the attached community center and medical clinic. Together they came to be known as the "Father Emmett Mission". He pushed for the Matthew Henson public housing projects (opened in 1940) and became chairman of the Phoenix Housing Authority. Time magazine said that "soon young Father McLoughlin began to be almost as well known in Phoenix as the mayor."

The clinic developed into St. Monica's Hospital in 1944, eventually becoming Phoenix Memorial Hospital. In People's Padre, McLoughlin says that some priests in the area objected to the clinic treating venereal disease. McLoughlin also encouraged workers to smuggle scorpion antivenom from Mexico.

McLoughlin's Franciscan superiors charged him with neglect of his priestly duties and ordered him to resign as superintendent of the hospital. McLoughlin decided that his work for the hospital and urban renewal was more important than his vow of obedience, and resigned as a member of the Catholic priesthood on December 1, 1948 to remain head of the hospital. He had the support of its board of directors, many of whom were Catholic.

He has been criticized in Catholic circles for not following the vow of obedience to the Church that he had taken as a Franciscan. McLoughlin criticized the Church for requiring young men to take such a vow, often without having experience of life outside school and seminary. He also criticized the Catholic parochial school system, and alleged that a Catholic plot had existed to assassinate Abraham Lincoln, criticisms which fed anti-Catholicism in America in the 1950s and 1960s. McLoughlin also joined Freemasonry.

In early 1970, Mcloughlin was still administrator of Phoenix Memorial. He later moved to Oklahoma, where he died on October 9, 1970. He is buried in Berwyn Cemetery in Gene Autry.

== Personal life ==
In August 1949, McLoughlin married Mary Davis. He met her when she came to work at Phoenix Memorial Hospital, working in the Medical Records Department. They later divorced. McLoughlin married Maurine Hardy in 1962 and they remained married until his death.

He noted in his 1954 book People's Padre that he did not lose faith in God after leaving the priesthood, but found he read more of the Bible and religious periodicals.

== Legacy ==
The city of Phoenix named the Emmett McLoughlin Community Training & Education Center in his honor.

St. Monica's Catholic Church in Phoenix later became St. Pius X Church, which was only sporadically active as a place of worship by the 21st century. It was reactivated as a Black Catholic parish, St. Josephine Bakhita Mission, in 2022.

== Works ==
- People's Padre: an Autobiography (Boston : Beacon Press, 1954).
- American Culture and Catholic Schools (New York: Lyle Stuart, Inc., 1960).
- Crime and Immorality in the Catholic Church (New York: Lyle Stuart, Inc., 1962).
- An Inquiry in the Assassination of Abraham Lincoln (New York: Lyle Stuart, Inc., 1963).
- Letters to an ex-priest (New York: Lyle Stuart, Inc., 1965).
- Famous Ex-Priests (New York: Lyle Stuart, Inc., 1968).
