= Stephen Joseph Rossetti =

American Catholic priest and exorcist

Monsignor Stephen Joseph Rossetti
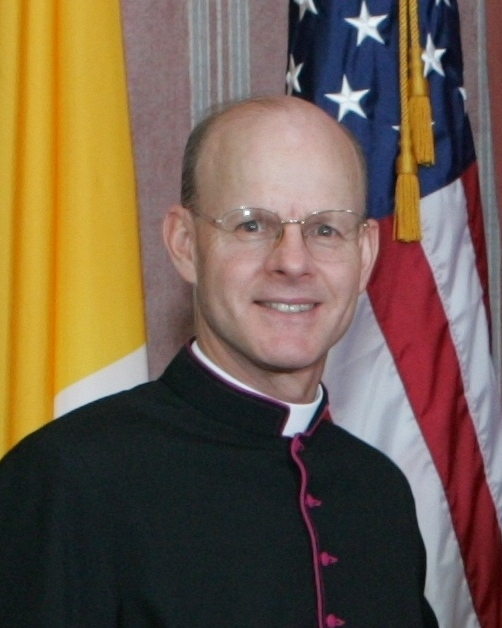
- Msgr. Stephen J. Rossetti

Orders
- Ordination: 1984

Personal details
- Born: June 15, 1951 (age 75) Marcellus, New York
- Denomination: Roman Catholic
- Education: United States Air Force Academy; University of Pittsburgh (MA); The Catholic University of America (DMin); Boston College (PhD)
- Military career
- Allegiance: United States
- Branch: United States Air Force

Stephen Joseph Rossetti (born June 15, 1951) is an American Catholic priest and exorcist, author, educator, licensed psychologist and expert on psychological and spiritual wellness issues for Catholic priests. He has appeared on such television shows as Meet the Press and Larry King Live. He served as president and CEO of Saint Luke Institute in Silver Spring, Maryland from 1996 to 2009 and as president from 2013 to 2014. In October, 2009 Rossetti stepped down from this position and in January 2010, joined the faculty of The Catholic University of America to teach in the School of Theology and Religious Studies. Since 2009, he has also served as the chaplain of the Washington Nationals.

== Education ==
Rossetti graduated from United States Air Force Academy in Colorado Springs, Colorado in 1973 and was commissioned as a second lieutenant in the USAF. He received an M.A. degree in political science from the University of Pittsburgh and served in Air Force intelligence. In 1980, he entered the seminary, Theological College, at The Catholic University of America in Washington, D.C., where he earned a Doctor of Ministry degree. In 1994, he received a Ph.D. in counseling psychology from Boston College. Rossetti was a Carthusian monk and novice for a brief period of time before entering the diocesan seminary.

== Pastoral assignments ==
In 1984, he was ordained as a priest in the Diocese of Syracuse. After ordination, he served in two parishes: St Patrick in Binghamton, New York and St. James in Johnson City, New York. In 1993, Rossetti joined the staff at Saint Luke Institute in Maryland, soon becoming executive vice-president. In 1996, he was made the president and CEO of the institute. In 2009, Rossetti stepped down from that position and in 2010 joined the faculty of The Catholic University of America in Washington, D.C. He returned to Saint Luke Institute from 2013 to 2014.

== Priest wellness and spirituality work ==
Rossetti has been a leader in the research into and promoting the wellness and spirituality of priesthood. He has conducted scores of workshops for priests in the U.S. and abroad promoting psycho-spiritual wellness and written dozens of articles promoting priest wellness and addressing such topics as a healthy integration of sexuality, anger management, stress in ministry, and priestly identity.

His book The Joy of Priesthood highlights the importance of priests living celibate lives with integrity. The main thesis of the book is that, despite its challenges and struggles, there is a great joy in being a Catholic priest. In 1985, Rossetti published a study of priestly life and morale. He surveyed 1,286 Catholic priests from around the United States and found that Catholic priests report being, by and large, a contented, fulfilled group of men. More than 80% stated "My morale is good" and more than 90% agreed that "Overall, I am happy as a priest."

In 2011 Msgr Rossetti published a landmark research study, Why Priests are Happy: A Study of the Psychological and Spiritual Health of Priests, on priestly wellness and spirituality. Using standardized psychological testing and scientific data on 2,486 priests from around the United States, the results showed that priests are psychologically slightly healthier than the general population, significantly less burned out, and much happier than the average American. His statistical research suggests several reasons for this high degree of happiness and wellness including: priests like being and ministering as priests; they report strong personal relationships with the laity and other priests; and they report a direct and nourishing relationship to God.

== Proponent of using psychology in theological reflection ==
Rossetti has been an outspoken writer, lecturer and advocate for the importance of using the insights of modern psychology in collaboration with orthodox Catholic theology. As both an ordained Catholic priest and a licensed psychologist, he has said that there is no inherent contradiction between real truths uncovered by a secular science and the beliefs of the Catholic faith. This insight is a consistent teaching of the Catholic Church. (See Fides et Ratio, an encyclical by John Paul II.)

Rossetti believes understanding and integrating psychology and church teachings is an important task for Catholic ministers and psychologists. The healing program at Saint Luke Institute, a mental health treatment and education facility for Catholic priests and other Catholics which Rossetti headed from 1996 to 2009, has become a model for this "marriage" between best practices in psychology and psychiatry and Catholic theology.

== Activist in the prevention of child abuse ==
Through his writings, workshops, research and participation in task forces, Rossetti has worked toward the prevention of child sexual abuse and raising awareness of the effects on victims. He has also worked on developing more effective treatment and supervision of offenders and creating institutional policies promoting education and prevention efforts.

He was a member of the 1993 "Think Tank" for the United States Conference of Catholic Bishops (USCCB) on child sexual abuse. The group produced recommendations published by the USCCB's Secretariat for Priestly Life and Ministry saying, "We are concerned that the hierarchy's authority and credibility in the United States is eroding because of a perceived inability to deal more effectively with the problem of child sexual abuse…We urge the bishops to respond to this tragedy decisively, pastorally, and immediately." Many of the recommendations were eventually adopted after the 2002 sexual abuse crisis erupted.

In 1994, Rossetti was a founding board member of the Interfaith Sexual Trauma Institute, which promotes the prevention of [sexual abuse], exploitation, and harassment through research, education and publication.

Rossetti was one of the original consultants in 1998 that helped develop the National Catholic Risk Retention Group's child abuse prevention program called VIRTUS. He was an expert adviser to the U.S. Catholic Conference of Bishop's United States Conference of Catholic Bishops Ad Hoc Committee on Sexual Abuse that drafted the 2002 Charter for the Protection of Children and Young People—commonly referred to as the "Dallas Charter." He also participated in the April 2003 Vatican Symposium on child abuse sponsored by the Pontifical Academy for Life. The Symposium was convened to "provide a deeper understanding of these issues within Church circles, and facilitate contact between the Church and the world of science."

Rossetti published a study documenting the spiritual damage to victims of child sexual abuse by Catholic priests in 1995. In 1997, he published a companion study that demonstrated that entire congregations are harmed when their priest commits child sexual abuse. One of the study's conclusions was: "for the church to demonstrate to Catholics, especially parishioners of an accused priest, a swift, credible and concerned response to allegations of clergy misconduct." Shortly after becoming President of Saint Luke Institute in 1997, Rossetti instituted the policy of recommending to dioceses and religious orders that priests or religious, having sexually molested a minor anytime in the past, never be returned to any unsupervised work or contact with minors. He has stated "one case [of abuse] is one too many." During his tenure as president, Saint Luke Institute treated 150 priests who had sexually abused minors with four of these known to have relapsed, yielding a very low relapse rate of 2.7%.

In February 2012, Msgr. Rossetti was an invited speaker to the Gregorian University in Rome's international symposium on the sexual abuse of minors, which was attended by bishops and religious superiors representing the Catholic Church around the world. His paper entitled Learning From Our Mistakes, highlighted six common mistakes that Church leadership have made in dealing with child sexual abuse including being manipulated by offenders and not listening first to victims, underestimating the prevalence of child sexual abuse, believing that perpetrators could be cured and risk-free, misunderstanding forgiveness and putting them back in unsupervised ministry, insufficient human formation of priests (especially in human sexuality), and missing the "red flags" of impending abuse. Rossetti made a plea that other Church organizations around the world learn from these mistakes and implement child-safe programs immediately so that the Church becomes "an international leader in promoting the safety and welfare of children."

He also recommended a "victims first policy," reporting all allegations to civil authorities, developing safety plans to supervise perpetrators, strong child-safe education programs throughout the Church, better screening and formation for candidates to the priesthood, and better education for Church leaders to recognize and intervene before abuse occurs. He predicted that America's "zero tolerance" policy would necessarily and eventually become the Church's policy throughout the world. He finished his talk by saying, "Our calling is to become the voice of millions of abused children. We must stand in the corner of those who are hurt and suffering. One day victims of child sexual abuse will look upon us, not as their foe, but as their advocates and their friends. That day is not yet fully here and so we are not yet fully the Church we are called to be."

== Spirituality author ==
Rossetti continues to write and speak in the area of spirituality. He has several books on prayer and the spiritual life such as I Am Awake, Fire on the Earth and When the Lion Roars. These books introduce the reader to the spiritual life and the life of prayer. His edited work, Behold Your Mother, encourages devotion to the Blessed Virgin Mary. In September, 2009, Ave Maria Press released his book: "Born of the Eucharist: A Spirituality for Priests." In October 2013, Ave Maria Press published Letters to My Brothers: Words of Hope and Challenge for Priests.

== Exorcism ministry ==
In addition to his academic and pastoral work, Rossetti became one of the most prominent Catholic exorcists in the United States. He founded the St. Michael Center for Spiritual Renewal, a ministry dedicated to deliverance and exorcism. In 2021, he published Diary of an American Exorcist: Demons, Possession, and the Modern-Day Battle Against Ancient Evil through Sophia Institute Press.

On 3 June 2026, Cardinal Robert W. McElroy, the Archbishop of Washington, D.C., removed Rossetti from his role as an exorcist after Rossetti stated in a 29 May video that "many, if not most" UFO sightings could be explained as demonic activity. McElroy said the comments "gravely undermined" official Catholic teaching on demons and exorcism, and the archdiocese cut ties with the St. Michael Center. According to Newsweek, Rossetti said he was saddened by the decision and apologized, pledging to remain obedient to Church doctrine.

== Honors ==
- Doctor of Divinity, honoris causa, St. Mary's Seminary and University, May 2013
- Pope John Paul II Seminary Leadership Award from the National Catholic Educational Association, 2013.
- Touchstone Award from the National Federation of Priests' Council, 2010.
- Conferral of Papal Honor of Monsignor, rank of Chaplain of His Holiness, November 19, 2006.
- Catholic Press Association Book Award for The Joy of Priesthood. Notre Dame, IN: Ave Maria Press, 2005.
- Alumnus Lifetime Service Award from Theological College of The Catholic University of America, October 2004.
- Distinguished Priest Award from the John Carroll Society of the Archdiocese of Washington (DC) for significant contribution to health care ministry, April 2, 2000.
- Proclaim Award from the United States Catholic Conference, Catholic Communications Campaign, 1994.

== Books ==
- Letters to My Brothers: Words of Hope and Challenge for Priests. Notre Dame, IN: Ave Maria Press, 2013.
- Why Priests are Happy: A Study of the Psychological and Spiritual Health of Priests. Notre Dame, IN.: Ave Maria Press, 2011.
- Rossetti, Stephen J. ed. Born of the Eucharist: A Spirituality for Priests. Notre Dame, IN: Ave Maria P. 2009.
- Rossetti, Stephen J. ed. Behold Your Mother: Priests Speak About Mary. Notre Dame, IN: Ave Maria P, 2007.
- The Joy of Priesthood. Notre Dame, IN: Ave Maria Press, 2005.
- When the Lion Roars: A Primer for the Unsuspecting Mystic. Ave Maria Press, 2003.
- A Tragic Grace: The Catholic Church and Child Sexual Abuse. ISTI Books, Liturgical Press, 1996.
- Rossetti, Stephen J. ed. Slayer of the Soul: Child Sexual Abuse and the Catholic Church. Mystic, CT: Twenty- Third Publications, 1990.
- A Fire On The Earth: Daily Living in the Kingdom of God. Mystic, CT: Twenty- Third Publications, 1989.
- I Am Awake. Paulist Press. 1987.
- Diary of an American Exorcist: Demons, Possession, and the Modern-Day Battle against Ancient Evil. Manchester, NH: Sophia Institute Press, 2021.

== See also ==
- Catholic University of America
- Saint Luke Institute
- Catholic Church
- United States Conference of Catholic Bishops
