= Diocese of Reno =

Latin Catholic diocese in Nevada, U.S.

Coordinates: 39°31′37″N 119°49′18″W

Diocese of Reno Diœcesis Renensis
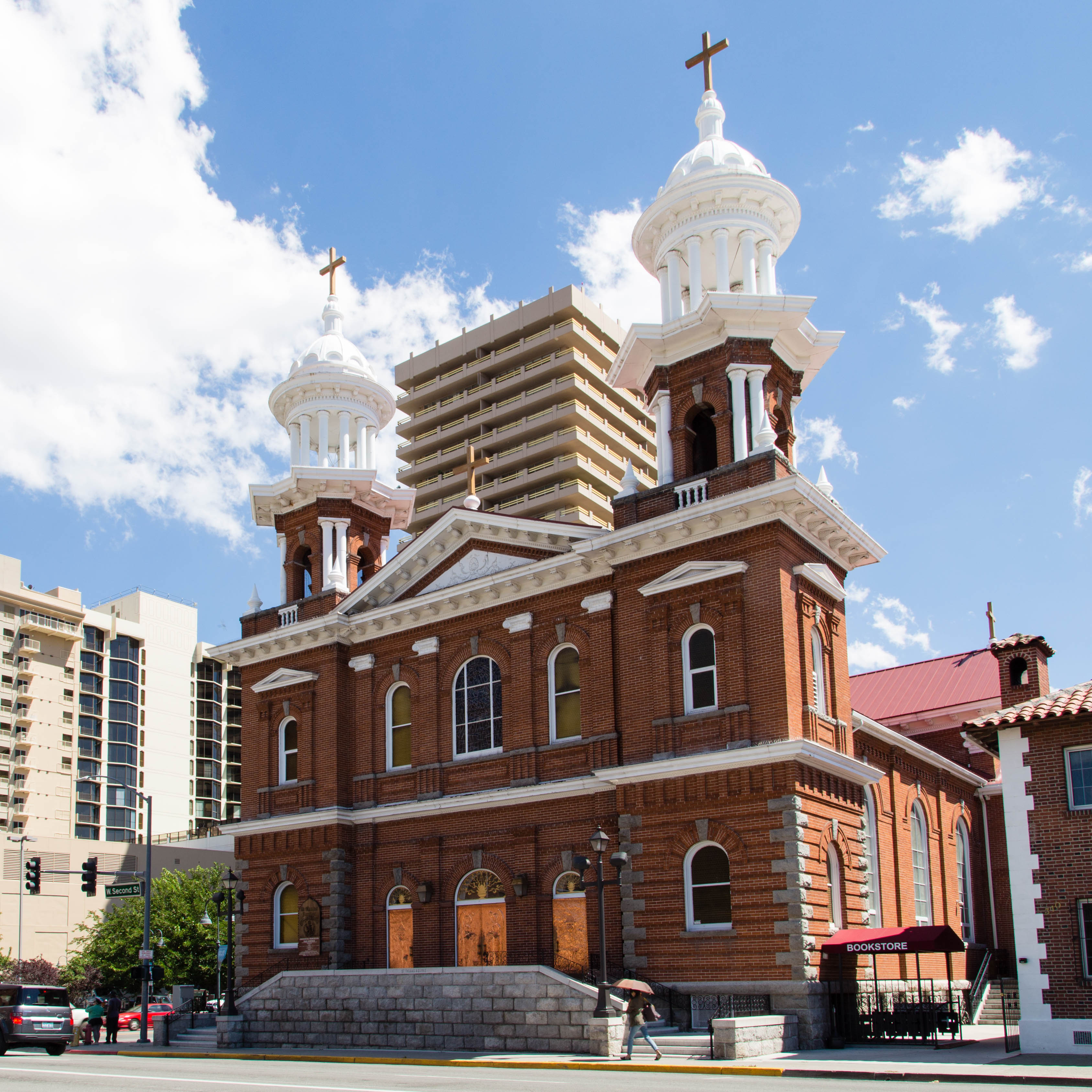
- St. Thomas Aquinas Cathedral

- Coat of arms

Location
- Country: United States
- Territory: Counties of Carson City, Churchill, Douglas, Elko, Eureka, Humboldt, Lander, Lyon, Mineral, Pershing, Storey, and Washoe
- Ecclesiastical province: Las Vegas

Statistics
- Area: 70,852 sq mi (183,510 km^{2})
- Population: Total; Catholics: (as of 2010); 835,000; 132,982 (15.9%)

Information
- Denomination: Catholic
- Sui iuris church: Latin Church
- Rite: Roman Rite
- Established: March 21, 1995
- Cathedral: Cathedral of Saint Thomas Aquinas
- Patron saint: Our Lady of the Snow; Holy Family

Current leadership
- Pope: Leo XIV
- Bishop: Daniel Henry Mueggenborg
- Metropolitan Archbishop: George Leo Thomas
- Bishops emeritus: Phillip Francis Straling; Randolph Roque Calvo

Map
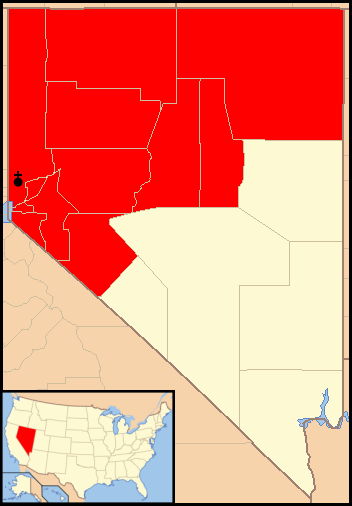

Website
- catholicreno.org

The Diocese of Reno (Latin: Dioecesis Renensis) is a diocese of the Catholic Church in the northern Nevada region of the United States. It is a suffragan diocese of the Archdiocese of Las Vegas. The mother church is St. Thomas Aquinas Cathedral in Reno. Daniel Henry Mueggenborg is the bishop as of 2026.

== Name changes ==
The diocese has undergone two name changes:

- Diocese of Reno (1931- 1976)
- Diocese of Reno-Las Vegas (1976–1995)
- Diocese of Reno (1995–present)

== Territory ==
The Diocese of Reno is composed of 12 Nevada counties: Carson City, Churchill, Douglas, Elko, Eureka, Humboldt, Lander, Lyon, Mineral, Pershing, Storey, and Washoe.

== History ==
=== 1860 to 1900 ===
With the discovery of gold in the western foothills of Nevada in 1858, large numbers of Irish immigrants flooded into the region, establishing mining towns. That same year, Archbishop Joseph Alemany of the Archdiocese of San Francisco sent Joseph Gallagher to the mining towns to tend to the Catholic population. Two years later, the Vatican placed western Nevada under the new Diocese of Grass Valley in California. Bishop Eugene O'Connell of Grass Valley started sending more priests to Nevada to establish missions and build churches.

The first Catholic church in Nevada was constructed in Virginia City in 1860 to serve the miners in that town. St. Theresa of Avila Church was constructed in Carson City around the same time. St. Augustine Parish was established in Austin in 1865; it has the oldest standing Catholic church in the state.

The first church in Reno was Saint Mary's, constructed there in 1871. A group of Dominican Sisters arrived in Reno in 1877. They opened Mount Saint Mary's Academy, the first Catholic school in the city. In Winnemucca, St. Paul Parish was founded in 1884.

=== 1900 to 1930 ===
The Dominicans in Reno opened Sisters Hospital there in 1908. Today, it is St. Mary's Regional Medical Center. St. Thomas Church, the future cathedral, was finished in Reno in 1910.

In 1915, Archbishop James J. Keane wrote a letter to the apostolic delegate to the United States, Cardinal Diomede Falconio. He advocated the establishment of a diocese for Nevada, citing the difficulties of the California diocese in providing coverage there. However, nothing came from Keane's initiative.

While traveling west through Nevada by train during the 1920s, Cardinal George Mundelein, archbishop of the Archdiocese of Chicago, asked which bishop was in charge of the state. When he found out that Nevada did not have its own bishop, he pushed the Vatican to establish a diocese there, offering support from his archdiocese.

=== 1930 to 1986 ===
Pope Pius XI established the Diocese of Reno on March 27, 1931. The pope named Thomas Gorman of the Diocese of Monterey-Los Angeles as the first bishop. At its founding, the diocese had a Catholic population of approximately 8,000.

Under Gorman, the diocese opened soup kitchens and homeless shelters in Reno in the 1930s as a response to the Great Depression. After the American entry into World War II in 1941, he created United Service Organizations (USO) social centers in the diocese for soldiers on leave, African-American wartime workers, and residents in Boulder City. Gorman became coadjutor bishop for the Diocese of Dallas in 1952.

The second bishop was Robert Dwyer of the Diocese of Salt Lake City, named by Pope Pius XII in 1952. In 1966, Dwyer became archbishop of the Archdiocese of Portland. Auxiliary Bishop Michael Green of the Diocese of Lansing replace Dwyer in 1966. Green retired in 1974. Auxiliary Bishop Norman McFarland of San Francisco succeeded Green in Reno in 1976. That same year, the pope renamed the Diocese of Reno as the Diocese of Reno-Las Vegas to acknowledge the explosive population growth of Las Vegas. McFarland was appointed bishop of the Diocese of Orange in 1986.

=== 1986 to 2010 ===
The second bishop of Reno-Las Vegas was Auxiliary Bishop Daniel F. Walsh of San Francisco, named by Pope John Paul II in 1986. When the pope split southern Nevada into the new Diocese of Las Vegas in 1995, he named Walsh as its first bishop. The Diocese of Reno-Las Vegas reverted to the Diocese of Reno.

The first bishop of the reestablished Diocese of Reno was Bishop Phillip Straling from the Diocese of San Bernardino, named by John Paul II in 1995. Straling retired in 2005. That same year, Pope Benedict XVI appointed Monsignor Randolph Calvo of San Francisco as the next bishop of Reno.

In 2009, Calvo was named in a lawsuit by Richard DeMolen, the former pastor of Our Lady of Tahoe Catholic Parish in Zephyr Cove, Nevada. Calvo had fired DeMolen because the priest had refused to remove a restraining order he had filed against a diocesan deacon.

=== 2010 to present ===
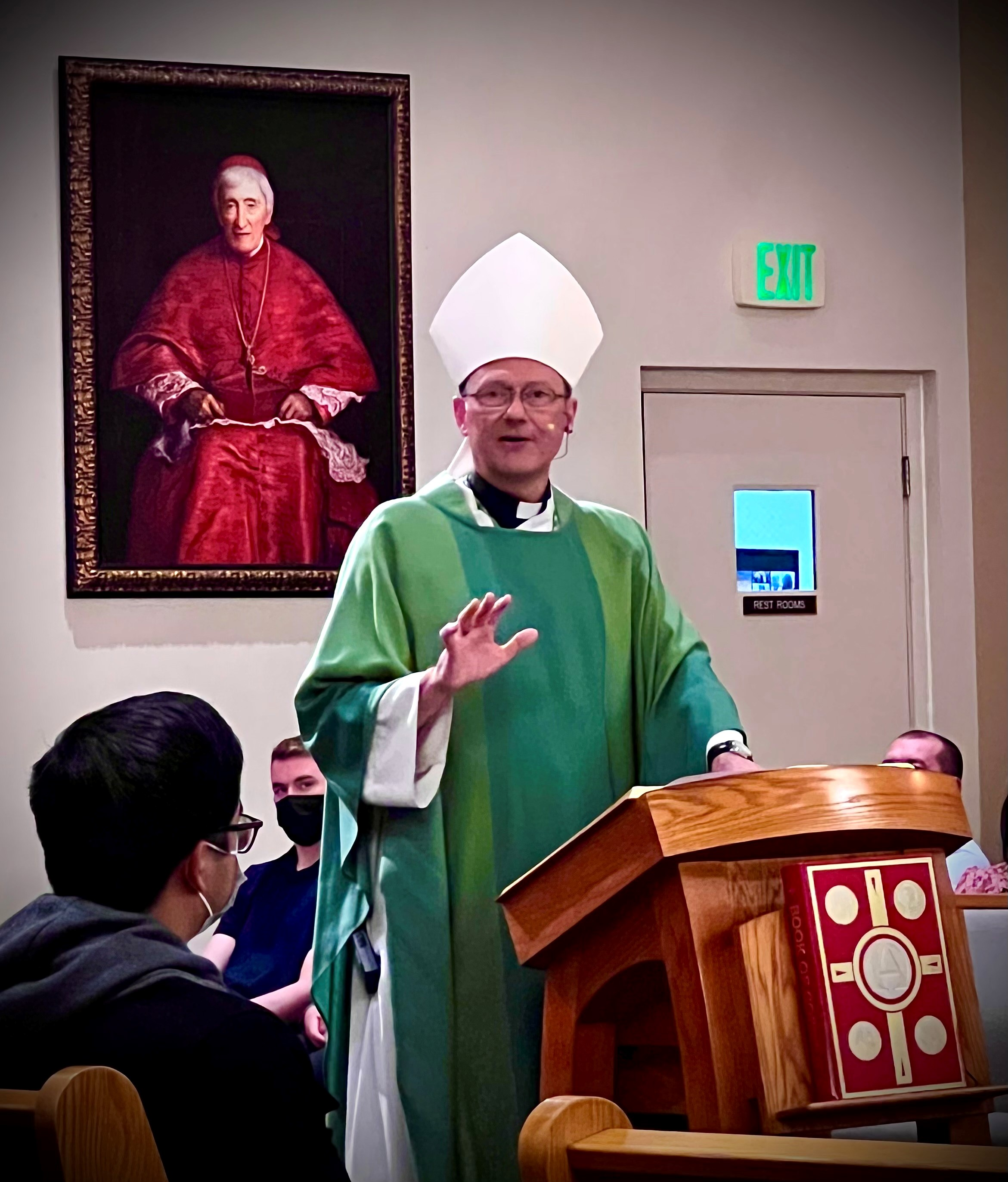
Bishop Mueggenborg (2022)

In 2021, Pope Francis named Auxiliary Bishop Daniel Mueggenborg from the Archdiocese of Seattle as the next bishop of Reno. The diocese became part of the Archdiocese of Las Vegas's ecclesiastical province upon the archdiocese's elevation as a metropolitan see in May 2023.

=== Sex abuse ===
Edmund Boyle, a chaplain at St. Mary's Regional Medical Center, was charged in 1987 with sexually molesting a 12-year-old boy who was mentally disabled. Boyle was later convicted of lewdness with a child.

In 2019, the diocese published a list of 12 clergy with credible accusations of sexual abuse of minors, dating back 80 years.

== Bishops ==
=== Bishops of Reno ===
1. Thomas Kiely Gorman (1931–1952), appointed Bishop of Dallas
2. Robert Joseph Dwyer (1952–1967), appointed Archbishop of Portland in Oregon
3. Michael Joseph Green (1967–1974)
4. Norman Francis McFarland (1974–1976)

=== Bishops of Reno-Las Vegas ===
1. Norman Francis McFarland (1976–1986), appointed Bishop of Orange
2. Daniel F. Walsh (1986–1995), appointed Bishop of Las Vegas and later Bishop of Santa Rosa in California

=== Bishops of Reno ===
1. Phillip Francis Straling (1995–2005)
2. Randolph Roque Calvo (2006–2021)
3. Daniel Henry Mueggenborg (2021–present)

=== Priest who became bishop of another diocese ===
Thomas Joseph Connolly, appointed Bishop of Baker in 1971

== Education ==
=== High school ===
Bishop Manogue High School – Reno

== Hospital ==
- St. Mary's Regional Medical Center – Reno
