= Joseph Strickland =

American Catholic prelate (born 1958)

His Excellency, The Most Reverend Joseph Strickland
- Bishop Emeritus of Tyler
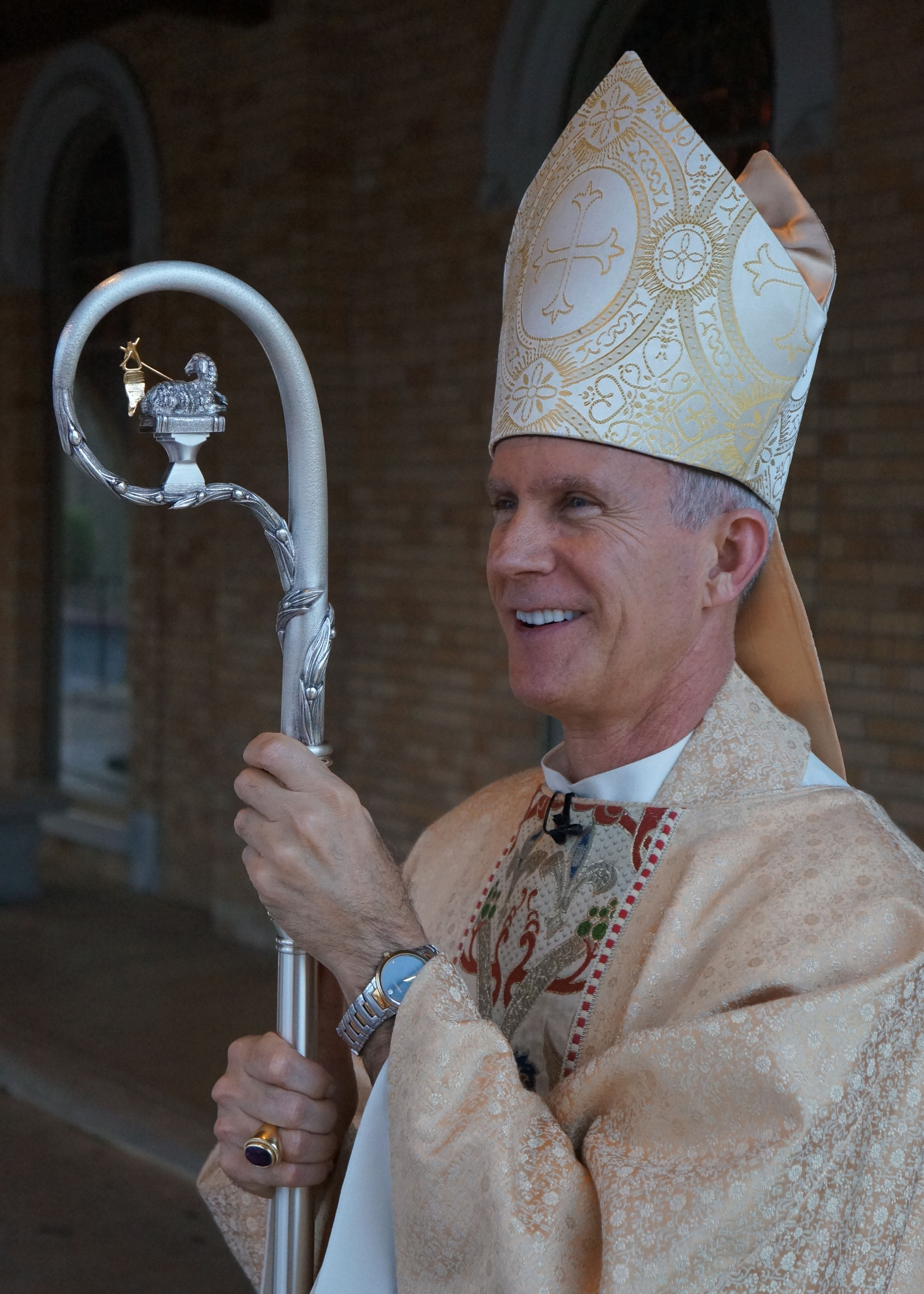
- Strickland in 2013
- Church: Catholic Church
- Diocese: Tyler
- Appointed: September 29, 2012
- Installed: November 28, 2012
- Retired: November 11, 2023
- Predecessor: Álvaro Corrada del Río
- Successor: Gregory Kelly

Orders
- Ordination: June 1, 1985 by Thomas Ambrose Tschoepe
- Consecration: November 28, 2012 by Daniel DiNardo, Michael Sheehan, and Álvaro Corrada del Río

Personal details
- Born: October 31, 1958 (age 67) Fredericksburg, Texas, U.S.
- Education: Holy Trinity Seminary; University of Dallas; Catholic University of America
- Motto: Ut Inhabitem In Domo Domini (Latin for 'That I may dwell in the house of the Lord') Psalm 27:4

Styles of Joseph Edward Strickland
- Reference style: His Excellency; The Most Reverend
- Spoken style: Your Excellency
- Religious style: Bishop

Joseph Edward Strickland (born October 31, 1958) is an American Catholic prelate who served as bishop of Tyler in Texas from 2012 until his removal by Pope Francis in 2023.

== Early life ==
Strickland was born on October 31, 1958, in Fredericksburg, Texas. As a young child, his family moved to Atlanta, Texas, where his parents were founding members of St. Catherine of Siena Catholic Parish. Strickland attended Holy Trinity Seminary in Irving, Texas.

== Priesthood ==
Strickland was ordained to the priesthood by Bishop Thomas Tschoepe on June 1, 1985, for the Diocese of Dallas. His first assignment was to Immaculate Conception Parish in Tyler, Texas. Upon the creation of the Diocese of Tyler in 1987, Strickland was incardinated in, or transferred into, the new diocese and was named its first vocation director in March 1987 by Bishop Charles Herzig. Strickland's service also included periods at Sacred Heart Parish in Nacogdoches, Texas and St. Michael Parish in Mt. Pleasant, Texas.

In 1992, Strickland was assigned by Bishop Edmond Carmody to study canon law at Catholic University of America in Washington, D.C., where he earned a Licentiate of Canon Law in 1994. Returning to Texas, Strickland was named judicial vicar of the diocese and rector of the Cathedral of the Immaculate Conception. In 1995, he was named a prelate of honor with the title of monsignor by Pope John Paul II.

Strickland served as apostolic administrator of the diocese from March 2000 until January 2001 when Álvaro Corrada del Río was installed as the new bishop. In 2010, Strickland was named vicar general. He served in that capacity until being named as a delegate of the apostolic administrator upon Corrada's 2011 departure to become Bishop of Mayagüez in Puerto Rico.

== Bishop of Tyler ==
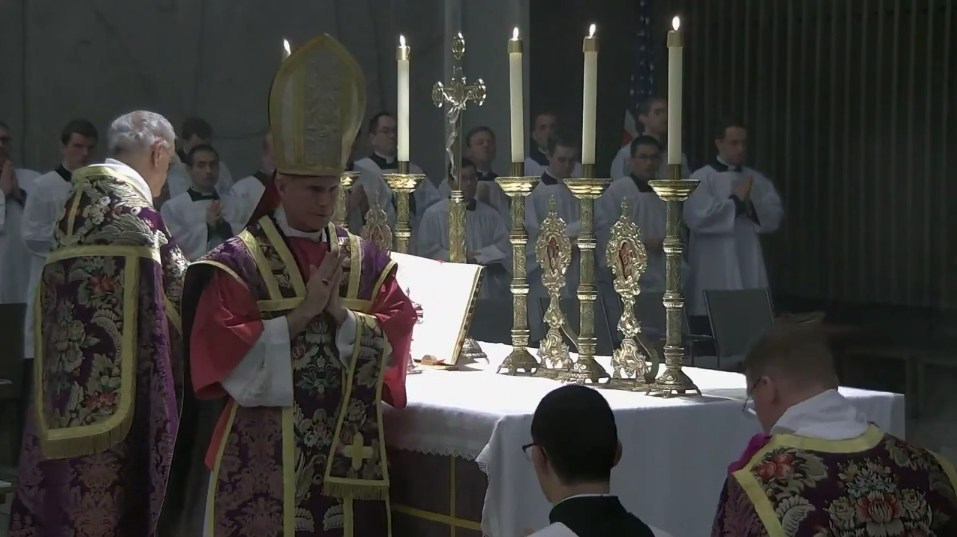
Bishop Strickland celebrating the Extraordinary form of the Roman Rite

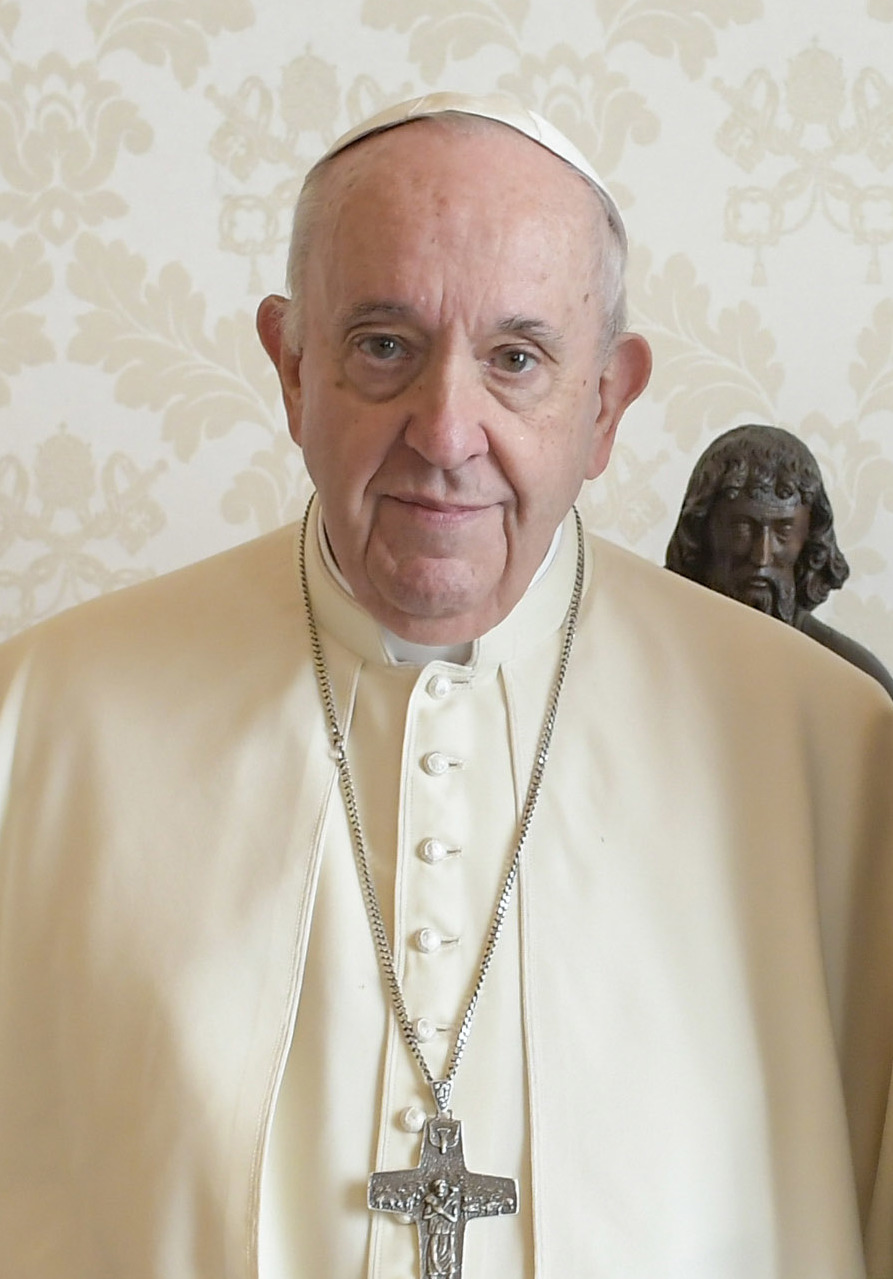
Pope Francis (2021)

Strickland was appointed as bishop of the Diocese of Tyler by Pope Benedict XVI on September 29, 2012. He was consecrated on November 28, 2012, at Caldwell Auditorium in Tyler. Cardinal Daniel DiNardo was the celebrant and principal consecrator. Strickland was the first native Texan to head the 33-county diocese.

Strickland in October 2020 described the Vatican as having a "deep state ... The church is weak. The church is not clear", with Pope Francis' support for civil unions being "Pope Francis' opinion on this, and I think that is confusing and very dangerous".

In July 2022, Strickland reposted on Twitter a video from the traditionalist Catholic newspaper The Remnant, that was fiercely critical of Francis. It described him, among many things, as a "diabolically disoriented clown". In May 2023, Strickland accused Francis of having a "program of undermining the Deposit of Faith".

The Pillar in June 2023 reported that Strickland had been subject to an apostolic visitation. One anonymous priest said the visitation was focused around "governance issues" of Strickland's diocese, including the early removal of finance officers, rather than Strickland's views on Francis.

In September 2023, The Pillar reported that a meeting of the Dicastery for Bishops discussed a recommendation to ask for Strickland's resignation. Following the apostolic visitation, the New York Times stated that several senior cardinals advised Francis to pressure Strickland to resign. In an open letter to the Diocese of Tyler in October 2023, Strickland refused to resign, "because that would be me abandoning the flock that I was given charge of by Pope Benedict XVI".

On October 31, 2023, at the Rome Life Forum of LifeSiteNews, Strickland read out a letter that he attributed to a "friend". This letter included the question: "Would you now allow this one [Francis] who has pushed aside the true Pope [Benedict XVI] and has attempted to sit on a chair that is not his define what the church is to be?" Strickland described the letter as "challenging" but did not dispute this accusation. The letter also described Francis as an "usurper of Peter's chair" and "an expert at producing cowards." Strickland then claimed that Francis backed an "attack on the sacred".

=== Removal from office ===
On November 11, 2023, Francis removed Strickland as bishop of Tyler, appointing Bishop Joe Vásquez as apostolic administrator in his place. That same day, Cardinal Daniel DiNardo, Archbishop of Galveston-Houston, issued a statement saying that after an investigation into "all aspects of [Strickland's] governance and leadership", it was concluded that "the continuation in office of Bishop Strickland was not feasible", and that the Dicastery for Bishops and Francis decided that Strickland should be asked to resign. DiNardo stated that this request was presented to Strickland on November 9, 2023, but Strickland refused and consequently he was forcibly removed.

In an online interview given several hours after his dismissal, Strickland stated that he was uncertain of the exact reason he was removed from office, "except I've threatened some of the powers that be with the truth of the Gospel". Strickland encouraged Catholics upset by the decision to pray for Francis and remain members of the church. In another interview, Strickland urged Catholics "to be more faithful than ever, not allowing [his dismissal] to pull them back from living faithfully and vibrantly and joyful," and to pray "for the deep abiding conversion of Pope Francis and of all of us to a deeper relationship with the Sacred Heart of Christ."

== Views ==
=== Politics ===
On November 4, 2012, days before the 2012 United States presidential election, Strickland led a public rally and prayer service in Tyler, asking attendees to turn toward God before the election. In an editorial for the Tyler Morning Telegraph, Strickland said:

The fundamental truths that once were and still should be the bedrock of our society are being challenged daily. I believe the election on Nov. 6 brings a great task to all of us as people of faith to soberly reflect on what we believe and how those beliefs should be embodied in our laws and supported by our leaders.

In September 2020, after the Reverend James Altman made a video stating "You cannot be Catholic and be a Democrat", Strickland told his followers to "heed this message" by Altman, endorsing the video and praising Altman for "courage". Altman had made numerous controversial statements, including a July 2020 homily that justified and minimized the effects of lynching, saying that among top three reasons for lynching was due to the victims being perpetrators of crimes like rape or murder, despite prominent cases like Emmett Till. Altman was removed from ministry by his bishop in July 2021. Strickland again came to his defense, stating "Fr. James Altman is in trouble for speaking the truth. I originally supported him when he spoke bold truth during the election. I continue to support him for speaking the truth in Jesus Christ...Let us pray for him."

In December 2020, Strickland spoke at a rally in Washington D.C. held by supporters of President Donald Trump who were contesting the reported result of the 2020 United States presidential election. In 2023, Strickland described US president Joe Biden as "evil".

In March 2025, Strickland published an open letter to Trump, asking him to end "the indiscriminate killing of civilians" by the Israeli Defense Forces in Gaza and to stop U.S. military strikes in Yemen. Strickland argued both conflicts violated the just war theory and were leading to "untold humanitarian consequences". In September 2025, Strickland criticized Mike Huckabee, the American ambassador to Israel, and Christian Zionism; Strickland also cited In multiplicibus curis and called upon Catholics to "to resist the slaughter of children in Gaza as much as we would oppose the slaughter of children in the womb."

In January 2026, Strickland has been chosen to say a special prayer under the intercession and protection of Our Lady of Guadalupe, in an event organized by Catholics For Catholics to give Tom Homan the Protector of America award, an award presented by Michael Flynn.

=== Sex abuse scandal ===
In August 2018, Archbishop Carlo Maria Viganò, Apostolic Nuncio Emeritus to the United States, released a letter accusing several high-ranking prelates, including Francis, of covering up allegations of sexual abuse against former Cardinal Theodore McCarrick. Viganò called on those responsible, including Francis, to resign. Strickland stated that he found Viganò's allegations "credible". Strickland instructed his followers to publicly distribute the allegations.

In January 2020, after meeting with Francis, Strickland said he never agreed with Viganò's call for the pope's resignation. He also stated that he was satisfied with the Vatican's investigation of McCarrick.In an October 2020 interview with the National Catholic Reporter, Strickland characterized the slow release of the Vatican's report on McCarrick as "evil". He then challenged Pope Francis to "go ahead and fire me" for this comment.

=== COVID-19 pandemic ===
In May 2020, Strickland signed a petition released by Viganò that criticized government restrictions during the COVID-19 pandemic. Viganò characterized them as intentionally "...creating panic among the world's population with the sole aim of permanently imposing unacceptable forms of restriction on freedoms." The petition singled out the use of contact tracing devices as well as mandatory vaccination as infringements on people's rights. It also cited "growing doubts ... about the actual contagiousness, danger, and resistance of the virus."

In a December 2020 letter to his diocese regarding the COVID-19 vaccines, Strickland wrote "I urge you to reject any vaccine that uses the remains of aborted children," in reference to the use of human embryonic kidney (HEK 293) cells for growing the virus. He later tweeted, "The fact remains that ANY vaccine available today involves using murdered children before they could even be born." Strickland added, "I renew my pledge — I will not extend my life by USING murdered children. This is evil WAKE UP!"

=== Tridentine Mass ===
Strickland celebrated the Tridentine Mass for the first time in June 2020, describing it as reverent and beautiful. Strickland encouraged Catholics to attend mass in that form of the Roman rite, and encouraged Catholics attached to the Tridentine Mass to attend the Mass of Paul VI, which he said could also be celebrated reverently.

== Arms ==
Coat of arms of Joseph Strickland
Notes The coat of arms was designed and adopted when he was appointed as the Bishop of Tyler. Adopted 28 November 2012 Escutcheon The left side is the coat of arms of the Diocese of Tyler. The right side includes at the top are the Sacred Heart and the Immaculate Heart, the shell represents the Strickland family crest and is also in Pope Benedict XVI's coat of arms. The wavy line is taken from the coat of arms of the Diocese of Dallas where he studied and was ordained to the priesthood. The cross of stars represents the Southern Cross which is visible in Australia and is part of the Australian flag. Motto Ut Inhabitem In Domo Domini (Latin for 'That I may dwell in the house of the Lord') Psalm 27:4

== Bibliography ==
- Strickland, Joseph (2020). Light and Leaven: The Challenge of the Laity in the Twenty-First Century. Catholic Answers. ISBN 978-1-68357-183-4.

Catholic Church titles
Preceded by Álvaro Corrada del Rio	Bishop of Tyler; 2012–2023	Succeeded by Joe S. Vásquez (apostolic administrator)
