= Cathedral of the Immaculate Conception (Tyler, Texas) =

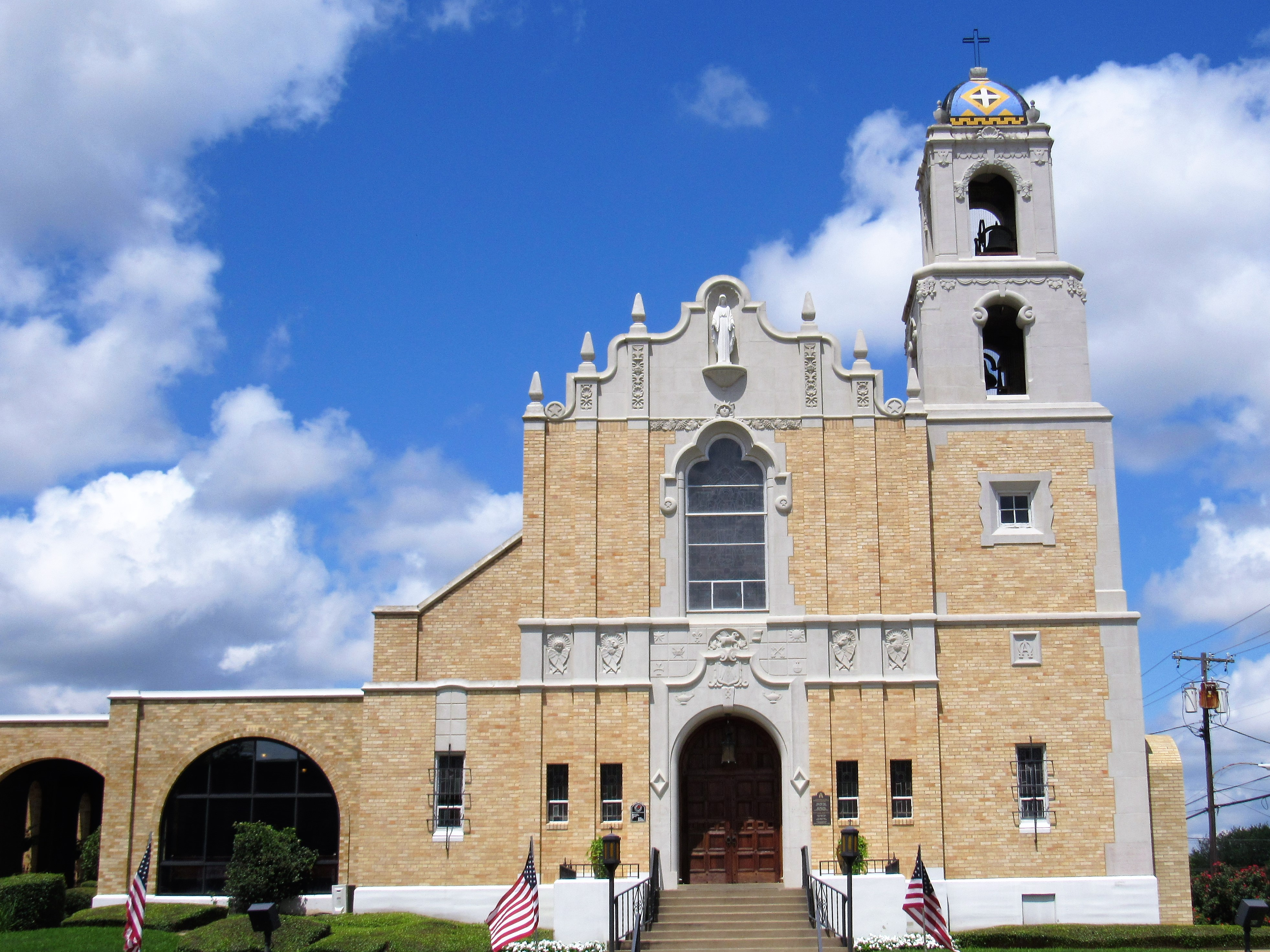

- Location in Texas Cathedral of the Immaculate Conception (the United States)
- 32°20′47″N 95°18′04″W
- Location: 423 S. Broadway Tyler, Texas
- Country: United States
- Denomination: Catholic
- Sui iuris church: Latin Church
- Tradition: Roman Rite
- Website: www.thecathedral.info

History
- Founded: 1878
- Dedication: Immaculate Conception
- Dedicated: March 17, 1935

Architecture
- Style: Mission Revival; Spanish Colonial Revival
- Completed: 1935

Specifications
- Materials: Brick

Administration
- Diocese: Tyler

Clergy
- Bishop: Gregory Kelly
- Rector: Hank Lanik

The Cathedral of the Immaculate Conception is a Catholic cathedral located in Tyler, Texas, United States. It is the seat and principal church of the Diocese of Tyler.

== History ==
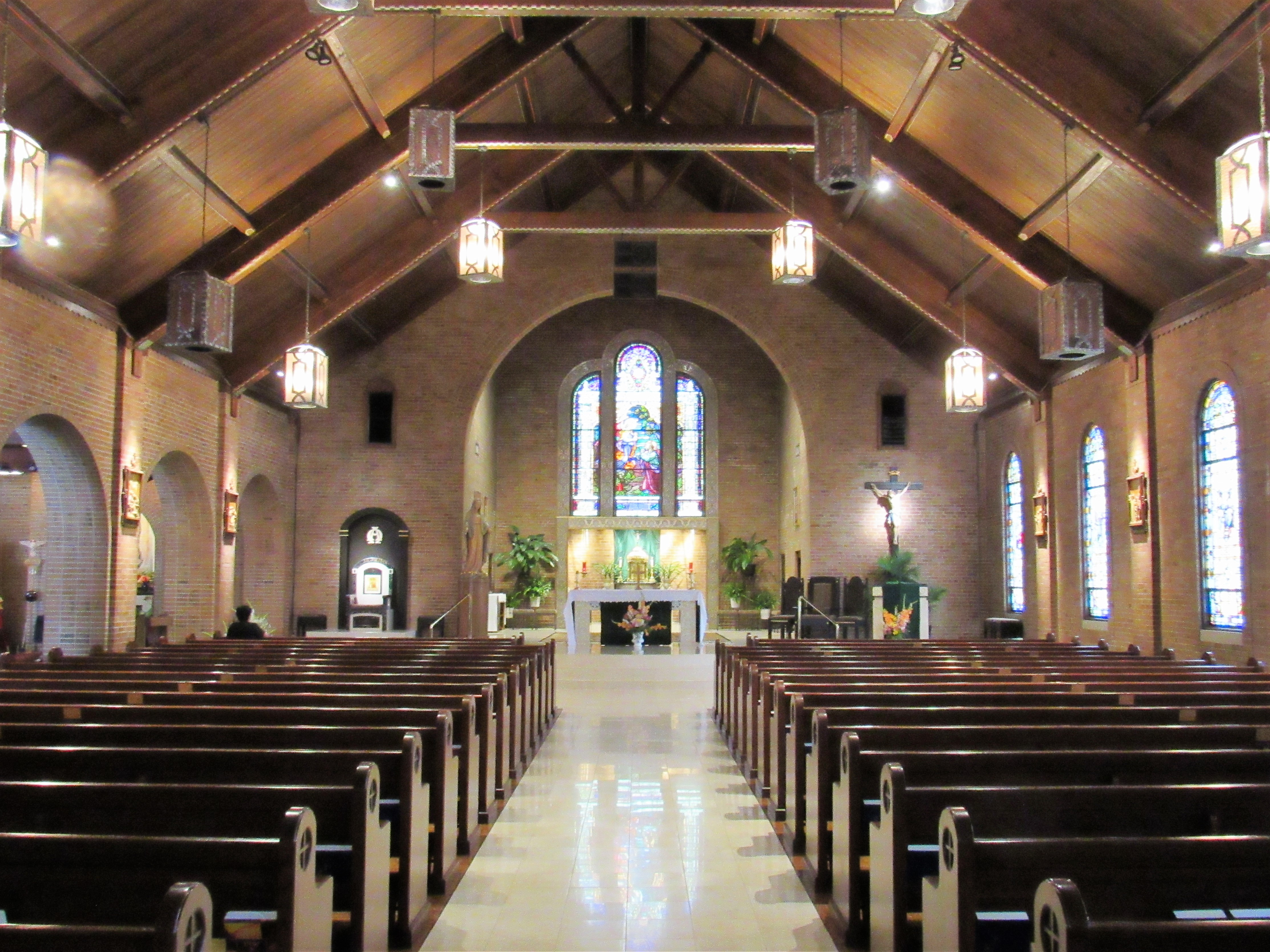
Cathedral interior

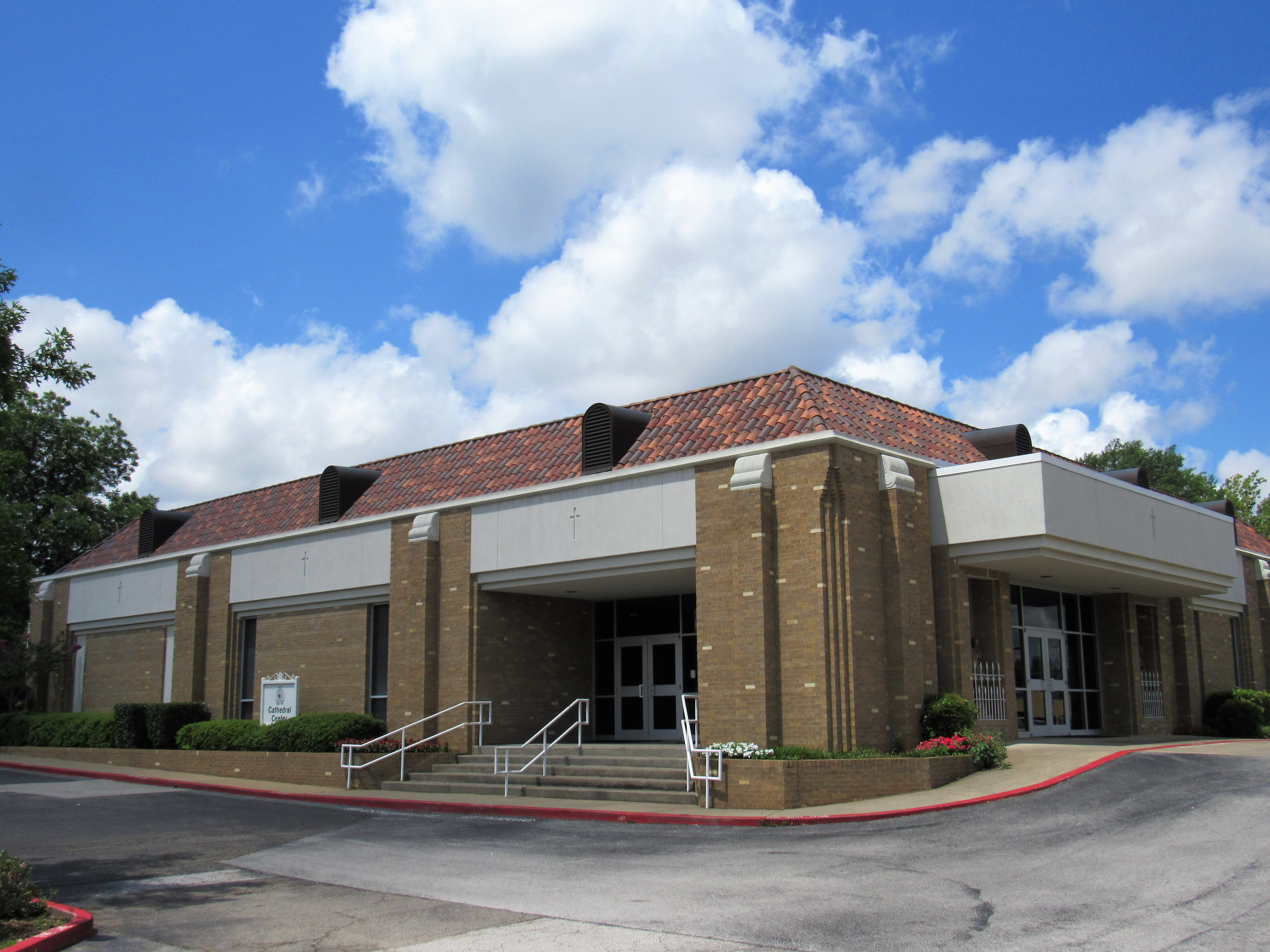
Cathedral Center

Tyler started to grow as the railroad came to town in the 1870s. Priests from Nacogdoches and Palestine came to Tyler to celebrate Mass and attend to the pastoral needs of Catholics. Immaculate Conception Church was established in 1878. A wood-frame church was built at the corner of West Locust Street and North College Avenue two years later. By the 1910s, it was evident that the parish needed a larger church, however, the present church would not be built until after the Sebastian A. Samperi became pastor in 1927. The congregation purchased property at Front Street and South Broadway and the new church was dedicated until March 17, 1935. The parish renovated and redecorated the church in 1949 and again in 1978. It added parish offices, a library and a large meeting room in 1984 and two years later, named the church basement facility for Father Samperi.

Pope John Paul II created the Diocese of Tyler on December 12, 1986, from portions of the Diocese of Dallas, the Diocese of Beaumont and the Diocese of Galveston-Houston. Immaculate Conception became the Cathedral at that time.

As the population of Tyler and Smith County grew, the Cathedral parish expand as well. In the early 1990s, the parish added the Cathedral Center, featuring meeting and banquet rooms for parish activities. In 1994, with thousands attending Masses every weekend at the cathedral, there became a need for an additional space. The parish created St. Paul's Chapel in the Chancery Office as a temporary facility while it planned a permanent location. The patience of the parishioners was rewarded on December 8, 2011, when Bishop Alvaro Corrada dedicated the 700-seat Chapel of Sts. Peter & Paul on the campus of Bishop Gorman Regional Catholic High School.

The parish includes St. Gregory Cathedral School which was opened in 1946. The school has twice been named a U.S. Department of Education Blue Ribbon School,

== See also ==
- List of Catholic cathedrals in the United States
- List of cathedrals in the United States
