= Michael Emile Mahfood =

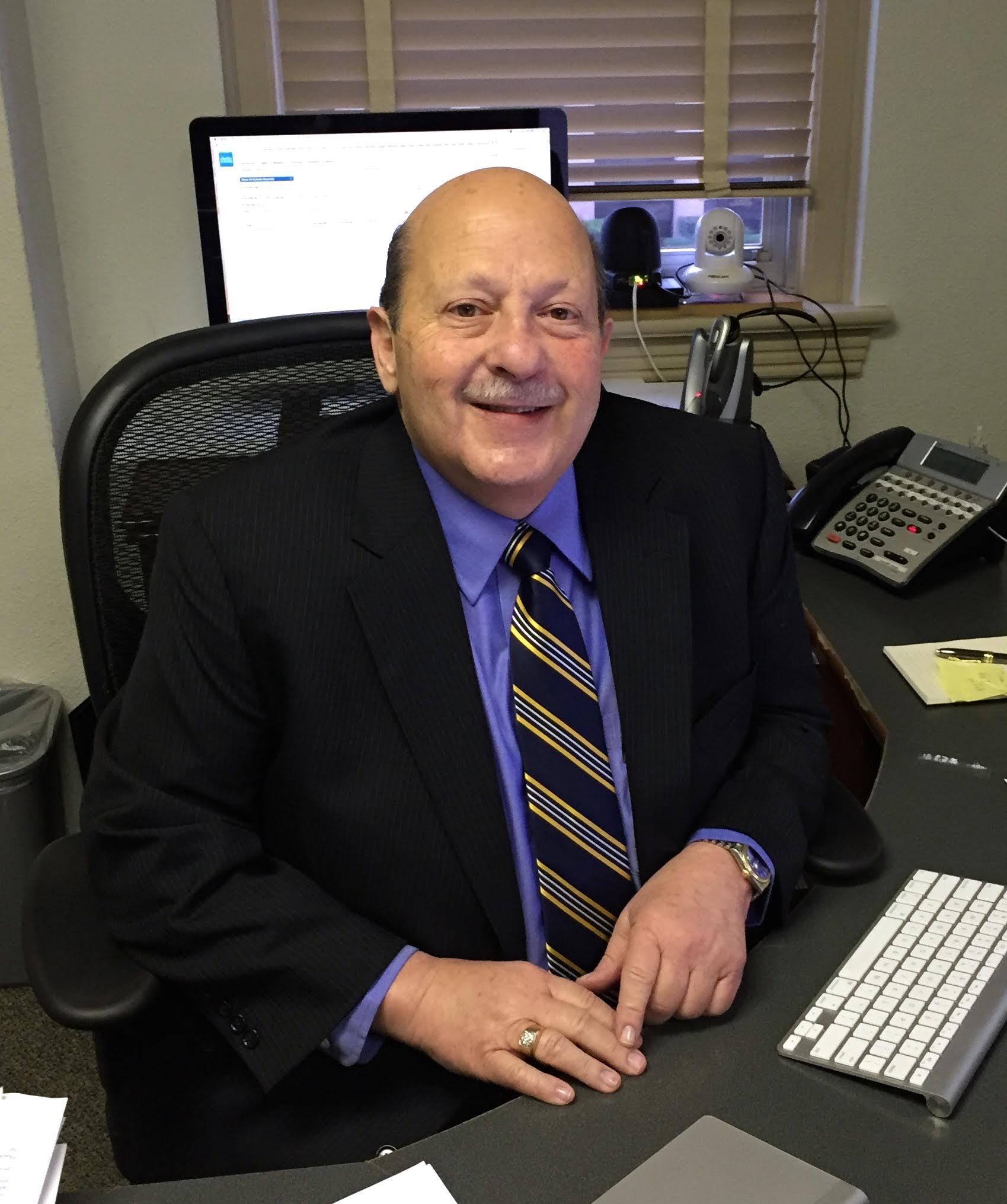
Michael Emile Mahfood, 2015

Michael Emile Mahfood (21 June 1949 Detroit, Michigan - 21 September 2021 Tyler, Texas) was the founder of Group M7 (est. 1995), a web service company in the United States. He assisted in improvements to education and healthcare endowments in East Texas.

His knowledge of technology and Internet workings was often used by local news media.

== Life and career ==
=== Childhood, youth and education ===
Michael Emile Mahfood was born 21 June 1949 in Detroit, Michigan, to Emile Nageeb Mahfood (b. 17 Oct 1922 Half Way Tree, Kingston, Jamaica – 21 Dec 2002 Tyler, Texas) and Maryrose Rasah (1927–2005). His maternal grandparents emigrated from Syria (Syria Vilayet, Ottoman Empire) to Detroit, while his father was also of Syrian descent by way of Jamaica, British West Indies. His maternal grandfather Louis "Louie" Joseph Rasak became an exceptional businessman. As a private in the U.S. Army in World War I he learned butchery skills, then he became a building contractor in metropolitan Detroit during the Great Depression. At age 49 during World War II, he owned Rasak Food Market. Michael's father worked for Sears Roebuck and Company in Wichita, Kansas in 1944, before removing to Detroit where he married Maryrose on 9 February 1947.

Michael's older brother was Phillip Emile Mahfood (14 Nov 1947 Detroit, Michigan – 10 May 2004) and his younger siblings were Rosemary Mahfood, Michele Marie Mahfood and David Emile Mahfood (b. 13 Oct 1965 Smith County, Texas, USA).

When he was young, his parents moved their young family to Longview, Texas.

=== Business career ===
The jobs Michael gravitated to were those where he was of service to others. He could apply his intellect to optimizing solutions to problems. He became an experienced entrepreneur. He owned First Mark Trading in Tyler from the early 80s to 1992.

In 1995, he started East Texas’ first website design company, GroupM7, when the internet was still in its infancy. By 2015, Group M7 managed in excess of 2,000 websites, and since his death has continued to thrive with expanded capabilities as a web support service company.

=== Family ===
In May 1971 at the age of 21, Michael Mahfood married Suzann Wilson in Smith County, Texas. They raised five children.

=== Religious and philosophical views ===
Mahfood served from 1986 to 1991 as a personal secretary to Bishop Charles Herzig, the first bishop of the Diocese of Tyler. From November 2012 through July 2017, he served as the chairman of the Finance Board of the Catholic Diocese of Tyler, Texas, under Bishop Joseph Strickland. In support of the Church in East Texas, he was founder of the Michael and Suzann Mahfood Scholarship, which assists in the advancement of Catholic education.

Michael served a term on the CHRISTUS Trinity Mother Frances Foundation Board beginning in 2017. He provided ongoing leadership through his service on the CTMF Foundation Community Health Care Innovation Fund Committee, which during his term annually awarded approximately $1 million (equivalent to $1.31 million in 2025) to Northeast Texas non-profits with an emphasis on improving Catholic health care and education.

In September 2017, Mahfood was elected to the Holy Apostles College and Seminary Board of Directors.

== Publications ==
Michael Emile Mahfood's publications include "Browsers, Business and Bandwidth: A Personal Journey down the Information Highway from the Beginnings of the World Wide Web to the Present", published by Rutgers University's Decision Line in October 2010, and many articles written for Tyler Today over the span of a decade.
