= Mahfood =

Mahfood is a surname. Notable people with this surname include:

- Anita Mahfood (born 1965), Jamaican dancer
- Jim Mahfood (born 1975), American comic book author
- Michael Emile Mahfood (1949–2021), American businessman
- Sharaf Mahfood (born 1966), Yemeni footballer
- Valerie Mahfood (born 1974), American boxer
