= Kieninger =

Kieninger is a German surname. Notable people with the surname include:

- Georg Kieninger (1902–1975), German chess player
- Gerda Kieninger (1951–2020), German politician
- Ludwig Kieninger, German sculptor
