= James Altman =

American sedevacantist priest

The Reverend Father James Altman
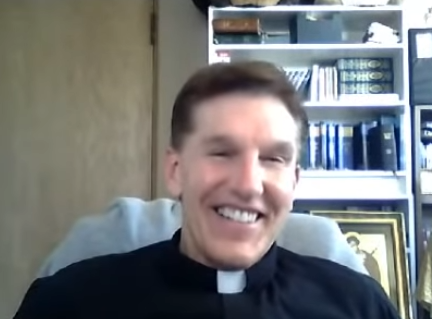
- Altman in a 2020 livestream

Orders
- Ordination: June 28, 2008 by Bishop Jerome Listecki

Personal details
- Born: James Altman
- Denomination: Catholic Church
- Occupation: Catholic priest

James F. Altman is an American Catholic priest of the Diocese of La Crosse who received attention in 2020 after appearing in a viral YouTube video denouncing Catholics who support the Democratic Party. After a subsequent dispute over his comments with his bishop, Altman has been banned by the Church from celebrating Mass or presenting himself as a priest publicly since 2021.

== Early career ==
Altman worked as an attorney in family law before entering seminary at the Pontifical College Josephinum in 2004 and later transferring to the University of Saint Mary of the Lake and being ordained a priest by Jerome Listecki on June 28, 2008. He was assigned to St. Peter and Paul Parish in Wisconsin Rapids, Wisconsin from 2010 to 2017, before being transferred to St. James The Less Parish in La Crosse, Wisconsin. While he was assigned to St. Peter and Paul, cemetery upkeep went into decline, as the cemetery soon found itself in debt.

== Election videos ==
In August 2020, in the months before the 2020 United States presidential election, Altman gained attention after appearing in a viral YouTube video. In the video, Altman stated that "You cannot be Catholic and be a Democrat", due to the party's support of legal access to abortion. He encouraged Catholic Democrats to "repent of your support of that party and its platform or face the fires of hell...There will be 60 million aborted babies standing at the gates of heaven barring your Democrat entrance." Altman also criticized vaccination efforts and restrictions on church gatherings related to COVID-19, and the DACA immigration program, and referred to climate change as a "hoax". Additionally, Altman in a homily justified and minimized the effects of lynching, saying that among top three reasons for lynching was due to the victims being perpetrators of crimes like rape or murder, despite prominent cases like Emmett Till.

Altman's initial comments regarding Democratic voters were praised by then-Bishop Joseph Strickland of the Diocese of Tyler, Texas (Strickland was subsequently removed from his role of bishop by the Pope). Father Dwight D. Longenecker also defended Altman from criticism. Altman was criticized by Father James Martin SJ who said he helped contribute to the January 6 United States Capitol attack. Martin's comments were in turn criticized by Bishop Richard Stika of Knoxville. In September 2020, Altman's superior, Bishop William Callahan stated that he would apply the "Gospel principles to the correction of Altman."

== Removal ==
In May 2021, Altman announced that Callahan had requested his resignation as pastor, and that he would contest the request with the diocese. In July, Callahan issued a decree for the removal of Altman as pastor from St. James the Less Parish. Callahan stated that Altman would remain a priest in the diocese, and continue to be paid, but would no longer be allowed to preach publicly. The day after the La Crosse Catholic Diocese announced Altman's removal as pastor, Altman gave the welcome prayer at the CPAC 2021. In November 2022, the parochial administrator of St. James the Less Parish was appointed pastor, succeeding Altman and implying that the canonical appeals of his removal had ended.

By June 2021, Altman crowdfunded some $640,000 from his supporters. He later purchased a house, without a mortgage, in Wisconsin for himself and his parents, and used some of the money fundraised to donate to an organization for "canceled priests" which he helped found.

After Altman's removal, Strickland came to his defense again, stating "Fr James Altman is in trouble for speaking the truth. I originally supported him when he spoke bold truth during the election. I continue to support him for speaking the truth in Jesus Christ...Let us pray for him." In September, actor Mel Gibson spoke in support of "canceled" priests, endorsing a coalition which supported Altman, among several other priests who faced similar circumstances. Gibson later met with Altman over dinner.

In June 2023, Altman gave a public speech in which he said Pope Francis was an antipope and not the true pope of the Catholic Church. In October 2023, he published a video on X arguing that Pope Francis (whom he referred to as "Jorge Bergoglio") should be "thrown into the deep blue Mediterranean sea" with a millstone around his neck, in what was widely interpreted as a call to kill the Pontiff; he later published another post comparing Pope Francis to Satan.

== Bibliography ==
- (2021) Let Freedom Ring: A 40-Day Tactical Training for Freedom from the Devil ISBN 978-1736519004
