= Ludwig Kieninger =

Ludwig Kieninger is a sculptor in wood and stone, specializing in woodcarving. He served as an apprentice for 9 years in Germany and earned the title of "Master Sculptor" in 1948.

Over the years, Ludwig Kieninger taught many students the art of wood carving. He has art displayed in the Vatican; various cathedrals in Germany; many churches in South and North America; the Holy Trinity Seminary at the University of Dallas in Irving, Texas; the Indian Museum in Tulsa, Oklahoma; City Hall in Dallas, Texas; the Grayson County Bank in Sherman, Texas; and all throughout Europe. He has worked on many restoration and repair projects of valuable antiques. In Germany, he was presented the keys to the city of Tiefenbach.

Kieninger's works vary in size, shape, and medium, but his emphasis is in ecclesiastical art and in life size dimension. He has worked with various stone, marble, and metal, but prefers wood. His focus is on capturing the expressions and emotion of the human form. He has also worked with architects and interior designers to beautify homes in the Dallas and surrounding areas.

A noted assembly of work, the Samuels' Hobbit Collection, painstakingly carved by Kieninger over a span of 14 years depicting the characters from J. R. R. Tolkien's The Lord of the Rings novel is currently on display in the main floor lobby of the Gaston T. Gooch Library at Navarro College.

== Major works ==
Male Fantasy Horse of Bavaria

  - “The Great Commission”
  - “The Lord’s Supper”
  - “Woman with Pitcher”
  - “American War Eagle”
  - “Last Chance”
  - “Male Fantasy Horse of Bavaria”
  - “Female Fantasy Horse of Bavaria”
  - “Holy Family”
  - “Scenes from the Middle Ages”
  - “The Great Race”
  - “The Hands of Marriage”
  - “Eight Seconds”
  - “The Venus Effect”
  - “Gift of Jesus”

== Biography ==
Ludwig Kieninger was born in Passau, Bavaria, on November 19, 1925.

Kieninger emigrated to Santiago, Chile, in 1953. He opened up a studio there and remained very active in his art there until 1959. At that time, he emigrated to Muenster, Texas. Due to increased demand of his art and teaching skills, in 1975, he opened up a more centrally located studio in Dallas, Texas, near University Park. As he grew older, he desired a studio more closely located to his home in DeSoto, Texas. So in the late 1980s, he moved his busy shop there.

He continued to teach and work steadily on his art until 2006, when he suffered a severe stroke. Ludwig Kieninger died Wednesday, February 12, 2014.
