= Gregory Kelly (bishop) =

American Catholic prelate (born 1956)

His Excellency, The Most Reverend Gregory Kelly
- Bishop of Tyler
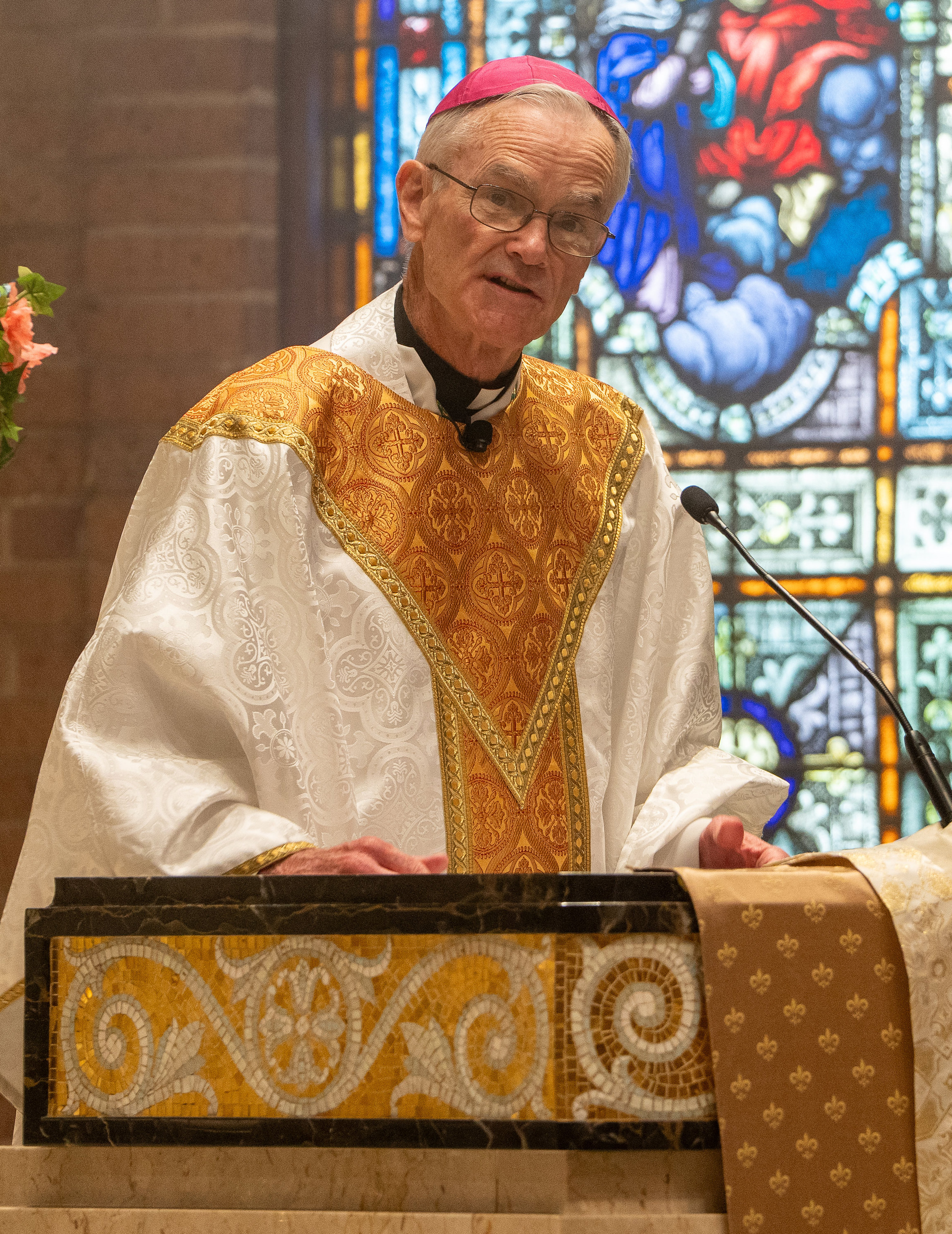
- Kelly in 2025
- Church: Latin Church
- Diocese: Tyler
- Appointed: December 20, 2024
- Installed: February 24, 2025
- Predecessor: Joseph Strickland
- Previous post: Auxiliary Bishop of Dallas and Titular Bishop of Jamestown (2016‍–‍2024)

Orders
- Ordination: May 15, 1982 by Thomas Ambrose Tschoepe
- Consecration: February 11, 2016 by Kevin Farrell, Michael Sheehan, J. Douglas Deshotel

Personal details
- Born: John Gregory Kelly; February 15, 1956 (age 70) Le Mars, Iowa, US
- Education: Holy Trinity Seminary; University of Dallas
- Motto: Take courage
- Styles
- Reference style: His Excellency; The Most Reverend
- Spoken style: Your Excellency
- Religious style: Bishop

Coat of arms as auxiliary bishop of Dallas

John Gregory Kelly (born February 15, 1956) is an American Catholic prelate serving as Bishop of Tyler since 2025. He previously served as auxiliary bishop of the Diocese of Dallas from 2016 to 2024.

== Biography ==
=== Early life ===
John Gregory Kelly was born on February 15, 1956, in Le Mars, Iowa, to John Dennis and Marilean Kelly. He started his college studies at Colorado State University in Fort Collins. When he decided to become a priest, he left the university to enter Holy Trinity Seminary in Irving. He received his Bachelor of Arts in philosophy from Holy Trinity in 1978 and his Master of Divinity degree in 1982 from the University of Dallas.

=== Priesthood ===
On May 15, 1982, Kelly was ordained by Bishop Thomas Tschoepe to the priesthood for the Diocese of Dallas at Sacred Heart Church in Colorado Springs. The diocese assigned Kelly as assistant pastor at All Saints Parish in Dallas. He left All Saints in 1986 to become chaplain at the University of Dallas, remaining there for the next decade.

Kelly was named in 1995 to also serve as vocations director for the diocese. In 1996, he was moved from the university to become pastor of St. Gabriel the Archangel Parish in McKinney. In 2008, Bishop Kevin Farrell appointed Kelly as vicar for clergy. Pope Benedict XVI named Kelly a monsignor in 2013.

=== Auxiliary Bishop of Dallas ===
Pope Francis appointed Kelly as titular bishop of Jamestown and as an auxiliary bishop of Dallas on December 16, 2015. On February 11, 2016, Kelly was consecrated at the National Shrine Cathedral of Our Lady of Guadalupe in Dallas by Farrell, with Archbishop Michael Sheehan and Bishop J. Douglas Deshotel acting as co-consecrators.

Following the appointment of Farrell to a Vatican post in August 2016, Kelly served as apostolic administrator of the diocese until the installation of Bishop Edward J. Burns in February 2017.

=== Bishop of Tyler ===
On December 20, 2024, Pope Francis appointed Kelly as Bishop of Tyler. His installation occurred on February 24, 2025.

== See also ==
- Catholic Church in the United States
- Hierarchy of the Catholic Church
- Historical list of the Catholic bishops of the United States
- List of Catholic bishops of the United States
- Lists of popes, patriarchs, primates, archbishops, and bishops

Catholic Church titles
Preceded by Joseph Strickland	Bishop of Tyler; 2025–present	Incumbent
Preceded by –	Auxiliary Bishop of Dallas; 2016-2025	Succeeded by –
