= St. Mary's Catholic School (Longview, Texas) =

Location
- 405 Hollybrook Dr; Longview, (Gregg County), Texas 75605; United States
- Coordinates: 32°32′2″N 94°44′14″W

Information
- Type: Private, Coeducational
- Religious affiliation: Roman Catholic
- Established: 1948
- Authority: Diocese of Tyler
- President: Rev. Daniel Dower, STL
- Principal: Darbie Safford, Ed.D.
- Chaplain: Deacon Jim Petkovsek
- Teaching staff: 27.3 (FTE)
- Grades: Pre-K–12
- Gender: Coeducational
- Student to teacher ratio: 6.0
- Hours in school day: 7 1/2
- Colors: Blue, Silver, and white
- Song: Bells of St. Mary’s
- Athletics conference: TAPPS
- Mascot: Knight
- Team name: Knights
- USNWR ranking: 1A
- Website: St. Mary's website

St. Mary's Catholic School is a private Roman Catholic PreK thru High School in Longview, Texas. It is located in the Roman Catholic Diocese of Tyler.

== Values ==
- Faith: Growth in knowledge and spirituality; appreciation of values and a capacity for right judgement
- Scholarship: Application of intellectual skills such as critical thinking, problem solving and understanding; development of each student's individual academic potential
- Leadership: Learn wise use of leisure time; discover and develop imagination, originality and creative abilities; practice the principles of democratic living; learn to work with others
- Service: Giving witness to the faith by putting love into action; forming a social conscience with a zeal for the common good

== Sports and competitions ==
St. Mary's Catholic School students compete in Soccer, Volleyball, Softball, Track, Cross Country, Golf, and Tennis [added 2020] through the Texas Association of Private and Public School (TAPPS). St. Mary's Catholic School students also compete in Archery through National Archery In The Schools Program (NASP). St. Mary's Catholic School students can compete in TAPPS academics, and TAPPS art.
