= George Cumby =

American football player (born 1956)

No. 52, 58, 91
- Position: Linebacker

Personal information
- Born: July 5, 1956 (age 70); Tyler, Texas, U.S.
- Listed height: 6 ft 0 in (1.83 m)
- Listed weight: 220 lb (100 kg)

Career information
- High school: Bishop Gorman (Tyler)
- College: Oklahoma
- NFL draft: 1980: 1st round, 26th overall pick

Career history
- Green Bay Packers (1980–1985); Buffalo Bills (1986); Philadelphia Eagles (1987)

Awards and highlights
- Second-team All-Pro (1982); Unanimous All-American (1979); 2× First-team All-American (1977, 1978); 2× Big Eight Defensive Player of the Year (1977, 1979); 3× First-team All-Big Eight (1977, 1978, 1979)

Career NFL statistics
- Sacks: 5.5
- Fumble recoveries: 6
- Interceptions: 5
- Stats at Pro Football Reference
- College Football Hall of Fame

George Edward Cumby (born July 5, 1956) is an American former professional football player who was a linebacker for eight seasons in the National Football League (NFL) during the 1980s. He played college football for the Oklahoma Sooners, thrice earning All-American honors, including a unanimous selection in 1979. Cumby will be inducted to the College Football Hall of Fame in December, 2026. A first-round pick in the 1980 NFL draft, Cumby played professionally for the Green Bay Packers, Buffalo Bills, and Philadelphia Eagles of the NFL. Cumby has coached college football at Texas College, and Tyler Junior College. He has coached at his high school alma mater, Bishop Thomas K. Gorman Catholic School and has served in various administrative roles since his playing career ended.

An ordained minister, Cumby has served as a pastor of several churches.

== Early life ==
Cumby is African-American. He was born in Gorman, Texas. He graduated from Bishop Thomas K. Gorman Catholic School in Tyler, Texas in 1975.

== College career ==
He attended the University of Oklahoma, where he played for the Oklahoma Sooners football team from 1975 to 1979. After playing on offense for two seasons, Cumby changed positions to linebacker in 1977. He was a three-time first-team All-American (1977, 1978, 1979), being a unanimous first-team selection in 1979. He was also named Defensive Newcomer of the Year and twice won Big Eight Defensive Player of the Year. He was described by then-head coach Barry Switzer as "the only person I know who could go one-on-one with Earl Campbell and knock him backwards." He finished his career at Oklahoma ranked second in school history with 437 tackles.

In 2026, Cumby was inducted into the College Football Hall of Fame.

== Professional career ==
Cumby was taken in the first round by the Green Bay Packers in the 1980 NFL Draft as the 26th overall pick. He started two games as a rookie and moved into the full-time starting position in 1981, a year in which he intercepted a career-high three passes and forced a career-high six fumbles. In 1982, Cumby was a second-team All-Pro selection. He remained a starter though 1984 and was relegated to backup duty in 1985.

During the 1985 season, Cumby gained national attention in a negative way. When rookie defensive tackle William Perry was put in the offensive lineup for the Chicago Bears, Cumby was twice "flattened" by Perry on lead blocks for Walter Payton. Later in that season, Cumby was beaten on a short pass route by Perry, who scored a touchdown on the play.

Cumby was cut by the Packers the following preseason and subsequently signed with the Buffalo Bills. Cumby was a starter in 8 of the 11 games he played in 1986. He played one game for the Philadelphia Eagles in 1987 when he was signed to bolster an injury-weakened linebacking corps.

== Coaching career ==
After his NFL career, Cumby was the athletic director and coach at his high school alma mater, Bishop Thomas K. Gorman Catholic School, for the 2006 school year. He has also served as the linebackers coach and special teams coordinator at Tyler Junior College. He was the head football coach at Texas College for three seasons until August 2014. He served as middle school athletic director at Bishop T.K. Gorman in 2015 before becoming the director of recruitment at Jacksonville College the following year. He also coached at All Saints Episcopal School in Tyler, Texas before returning to coach at Bishop T.K. Gorman in 2021.

== Head coaching record ==
=== College ===
Year	Team	Overall	Conference	Standing
Texas College Steers (Central States Football League) (2011)
2011	Texas College	0–11	0–5	6th
Texas College Steers (NAIA independent) (2012)
2012	Texas College	2–9		
Texas College Steers (Central States Football League) (2013)
2013	Texas College	1–9	1–4	5th
Texas College:		3–29	1–9	
Total:		3–29		
