= Charles Edwin Herzig =

His Excellency, The Most Reverend Charles Edwin Herzig
- Bishop of Tyler
- Church: Roman Catholic Church
- See: Diocese of Tyler
- In office: February 24, 1987 to September 7, 1991
- Successor: Edmond Carmody

Orders
- Ordination: May 31, 1955 by Robert Emmet Lucey
- Consecration: December 12, 1986 by Patrick Fernández Flores

Personal details
- Born: August 14, 1929 San Antonio, Texas, US
- Died: September 7, 1991 (aged 62)

Charles Edwin Herzig (August 14, 1929 – September 7, 1991) was an American prelate of the Roman Catholic Church. He served as the first bishop of the Diocese of Tyler in Texas from 1987 until his death in 1991.

== Biography ==
=== Early life ===
Charles Herzig was born on August 14, 1929, in San Antonio, Texas. The grandson of a Lutheran minister, Herzig was ordained to the priesthood for the Diocese of Galveston by Archbishop Robert Lucey on May 31, 1955.

=== Bishop of Tyler ===
On December 12, 1986, Herzig was named bishop of the newly created Diocese of Tyler by Pope John Paul II. Herzig was consecrated at the Oil Palace in Tyler, Texas, on February 24, 1987, by Archbishop Patrick Flores, assisted by Bishop Thomas Tschoepe and Archbishop Michael Sheehan. His personal secretary was Michael Emile Mahfood.

Charles Herzig died of cancer on September 7, 1991, at age 62. The Bishop Charles E. Herzig Humanitarian Award is given out annually by the diocese.

== See also ==
- Catholic Church hierarchy
- Catholic Church in the United States
- Historical list of the Catholic bishops of the United States
- List of Catholic bishops of the United States
- Lists of patriarchs, archbishops, and bishops

== Episcopal succession ==
Catholic Church titles
Preceded by none	Bishop of Tyler; 1992-2000	Succeeded by Edmond Carmody
