= Bishop Thomas K. Gorman Catholic School =

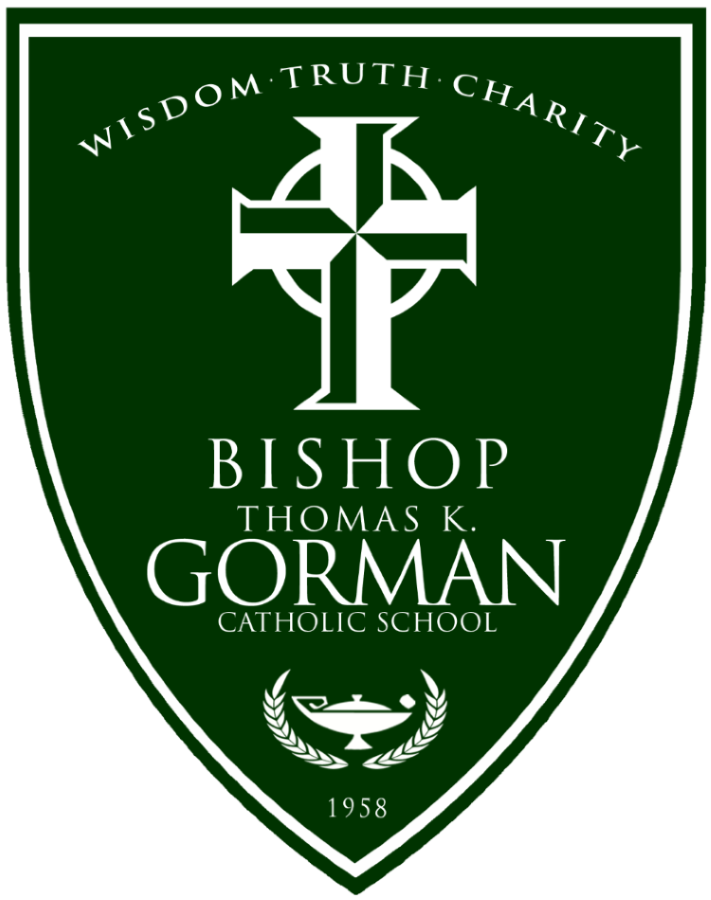

Location
- 1405 East Southeast Loop 323; Tyler, (Smith County), Texas 75701; United States
- Coordinates: 32°18′16″N 95°17′6″W

Information
- Type: Parochial, Coeducational
- Motto: Seek Wisdom Through Truth and Charity
- Religious affiliation: Roman Catholic
- Established: September 1958; 67 years ago
- CEEB code: 447-117
- Principal: John Kimec
- Teaching staff: 33 (FTE) (2015–16)
- Grades: 6–12
- Enrollment: 291 (2015–16)
- Average class size: 24
- Student to teacher ratio: 11.8:1 (2015–16)
- Campus size: 30 acres (120,000 m^{2})
- Colors: Green; White
- Athletics conference: Texas Association of Private and Parochial Schools (TAPPS)
- Mascot: Crusaders
- Accreditation: Southern Association of Colleges and Schools
- Newspaper: The Lance
- Website: www.bishopgorman.net

Bishop Thomas K. Gorman Catholic School is a parochial Catholic high school and middle school in Tyler, Texas, United States. It is located in the Roman Catholic Diocese of Tyler.

== Background ==
The school was established in 1958 and is named for Thomas Kiely Gorman, the fourth bishop of the Roman Catholic Diocese of Dallas from 1954 to 1964. At the time of its founding, the school was within the boundaries of the Diocese of Dallas. The eastern portion of the Diocese of Dallas was ceded to the Diocese of Tyler, which was established in 1987.

Located on 30 acres (120,000 m^{2}) in south Tyler, the school's campus features a main classroom building, Saints Peter and Paul Chapel, two gyms, a fine arts center, McCallum Stadium, the renovated Holy Family Library, as well as numerous sports fields and a newly built athletics building including a full gym and trainer's room. It has been ranked as a Top 50 Catholic High School since 2004.

== Facilities ==
Bishop Thomas K. Gorman maintains several facilities for academic, athletic, and community purposes.

- Main Campus Building
- Saints Peter and Paul Chapel
- Holy Family Library
- McCallum Stadium (football) (soccer)
- Haddad Gym
- Milam Joseph Center
- Baseball Field
- Carney Softball Field
- Tennis Courts
- Field House
- Master's Garden
- Brodnax Family Crusader Center

== Athletics ==
Fall Athletic Offerings

- Cheerleading
- Cross Country
- Football
- Ladies Volleyball

Winter Interscholastic Sports

- Basketball
- Cheerleading
- Soccer
- Wrestling

Spring Interscholastic Sports

- Track
- Baseball

== Technology ==
Mac desktop computers in art room and computer labs. Wacom drawing tablets for use of students. Each high school student receives a Macbook at the beginning of the school year. Middle school students provided with Chromebooks.

== State championships ==
State Championships won by Bishop Thomas K. Gorman:

- Overall State Champions - 2001, 2002
- Academic State Champions - 1999, 2000, 2001, 2002
- Middle School Academic (PSIA) - 2014
- Choir - 2002, 2006, 2010
- Academics - 1999, 2000, 2002
- Ladies Track - 1999, 2000, 2001, 2002, 2003, 2004, 2005, 2006
- Ladies Cross Country- 2020
- Men's Cross Country - 2001
- Women's Cross Country - 2004, 2005, 2006, 2020
- Football - 1984, 1995
- Soccer - 2000, 2001
- Golf - 1991, 1992
- Men's Track - 2000, 2002
- Men's Basketball - 1987, 1988
- Women's Tennis - 1980, 1984
- Men's Tennis - 1984

The Bishop Thomas K Gorman high school ladies track team currently holds the record for the most consecutive state championships in TAPPS history, having won the state Track & Field championship every year from 1999 to 2006. The Bishop Gorman Ladies Cross Country team places consistently at TAPPS state championships.

== Notable alumni ==
- George Cumby (NFL linebacker, college football All-American)
