= Edmond Carmody =

Irish-born American prelate

His Excellency, The Most Reverend Edmond Carmody
- Bishop Emeritus of Corpus Christi titular bishop of Murthlacum
- Diocese: Corpus Christi
- Appointed: February 3, 2000
- Installed: March 17, 2000
- Retired: January 18, 2010
- Predecessor: Roberto González Nieves
- Successor: William Mulvey
- Previous posts: Bishop of Tyler (1992-2000); Auxiliary Bishop of San Antonio (1988-1992)

Orders
- Ordination: June 8, 1957 by Thomas Keogh
- Consecration: December 15, 1988 by Patrick Flores, Charles Victor Grahmann, and Charles Edwin Herzig

Personal details
- Born: January 12, 1934 (age 92) Ahalane, Ireland
- Education: St. Patrick's, Carlow College; Our Lady of the Lake University
- Motto: With Christ all is possible

Styles of Edmond Carmody
- Reference style: His Excellency; The Most Reverend
- Spoken style: Your Excellency
- Religious style: Bishop

Edmond Carmody (born January 12, 1934) is an Irish-born American prelate of the Roman Catholic Church. He served as bishop of the Diocese of Corpus Christi in Texas (2000 to 2010), bishop of the Diocese of Tyler in Texas (1992 to 2000) and as auxiliary bishop of the Archdiocese of San Antonio in Texas (1988 to 1992). While still a priest, Carmody spent five years working as a missionary in Ecuador.

== Biography ==
=== Early life ===
Edmond Carmody was born on January 12, 1934, in Ahalane, Moyvane, County Kerry, in Ireland. He was second child of Michael Carmody and Mary Stack who had 12 other children.

Carmody received his primary education at a local national school in Ireland, then attended St. Brendan's Seminary in Killarney, Ireland for his high school education. After finishing at St. Brendan's, he entered the Major Seminary of St. Patrick in Carlow, Ireland, for his priestly formation.

=== Priesthood ===
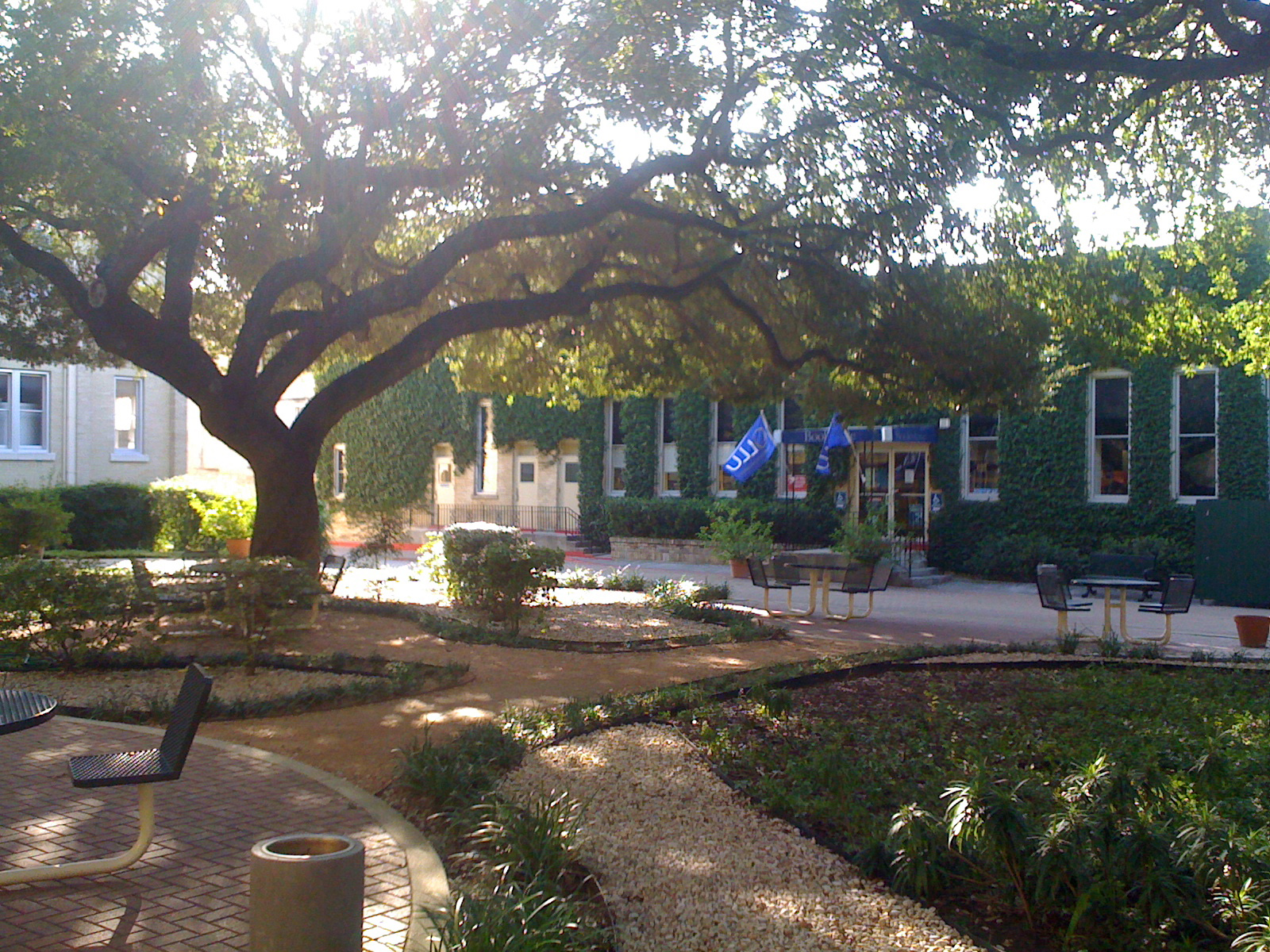
Our Lady of the Lake University, San Antonio, Texas

Carmody was ordained into the priesthood at St. Patrick Seminary in Carlow by Bishop Thomas Keogh on June 8,1957, for the Archdiocese of San Antonio. After his ordination, Carmody emigrated to the United States in September 1957, going to San Antonio.

After a few weeks at St. Mary's Parish in Victoria, Texas, Carmody was assigned on November 22, 1957, as associate pastor at St. Margaret Mary's Parish in San Antonio. After three years at St. Margaret's, Carmody was transferred on September 16, 1960, to be associate pastor at St. Henry's Parish In San Antonio.

Aside from his pastoral assignments, Carmody was named on February 4, 1965, as assistant archdiocesan chaplain of scouts. On August 29, 1966, he was appointed secretary to the archdiocesan tribunal and chaplain of Incarnate Word High School in San Antonio. Carmody participated in the tribunal and at the high school for the next 17 years. He also served as a chaplain to the Texas Army National Guard for six years.

In 1968 Carmody received a Master of Education degree from Our Lady of the Lake University in San Antonio and in 1973 a Master of Social Work degree.

In 1982, Carmody went to Guayaquil, Ecuador to serve with the Missionary Society of St. James the Apostle. A few days before his scheduled return to Texas in 1988, Archbishop Patrick Flores told him to leave immediately because of his appointment as auxiliary bishop.

=== Auxiliary Bishop of San Antonio ===
Pope John Paul II appointed Carmody as an auxiliary bishop of San Antonio and titular bishop of Murthlacum on November 8, 1988. He was consecrated on December 15, 1988. The principal consecrator was Flores; Carmody's principal co-consecrators were Bishops Charles Grahmann and Charles Herzig.

=== Bishop of Tyler ===
On March 24, 1992, John Paul II appointed Carmody as bishop of Tyler. He was installed on May 25, 1992.

=== Bishop of Corpus Christi ===
On February 3, 2000, John Paul II appointed Carmody as bishop of Corpus Christi. He was installed on March 17, 2000. In 2006, Carmody founded John Paul II High School in Corpus Christi.

=== Retirement ===
When Carmody reached the mandatory retirement age of 75 in 2009, he sent his letter of resignation as bishop of Corpus Christi to Pope Benedict XVI. The pope accepted his resignation and named then Reverend William Mulvey as his replacement on January 18, 2010.

After his retirement, Carmody taught a class in church history at John Paul II High School until he returned to Tyler in 2013. He served as the vicar general and moderator of the curia for the Diocese of Tyler until 2015. Carmody then moved back to Corpus Christi, where he was still residing as of 2024.

== Sources ==
- Diocese of Corpus Christi www.diocesecc.org Retrieved: 2010-04-16.

== Episcopal succession ==
Catholic Church titles
Preceded by –	Bishop Emeritus of Corpus Christi; 2010-Present	Succeeded by Incumbent
Preceded by Roberto González Nieves	Bishop of Corpus Christi; 2000-2010	Succeeded by William Mulvey
Preceded by Charles Edwin Herzig	Bishop of Tyler; 1992-2000	Succeeded by Álvaro Corrada del Río
Preceded by –	Auxiliary Bishop of San Antonio; 1988-1992	Succeeded by –
