= Diocese of Tyler =

Latin Catholic ecclesiastical jurisdiction in Texas, U.S.

Coordinates: 32°20′03″N 95°18′00″W

Diocese of Tyler Dioecesis Tylerensis

Catholic
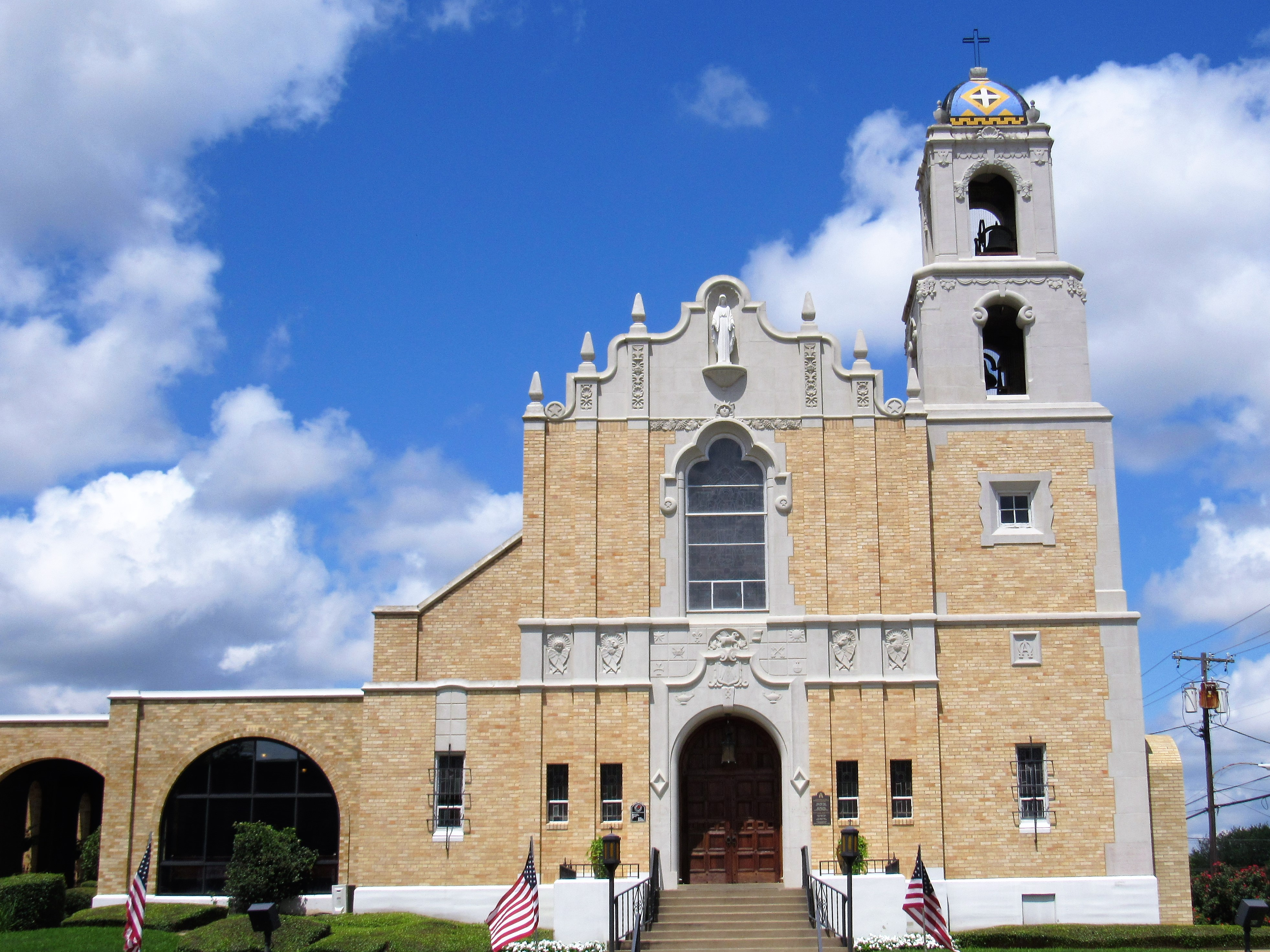
- Cathedral of the Immaculate Conception

- Coat of arms

Location
- Country: United States
- Territory: 33 counties in Eastern Texas
- Ecclesiastical province: Archdiocese of Galveston-Houston

Statistics
- Population: Total; Catholics: (as of 2024); 1,460,387; 121,212 (8.3%)

Information
- Denomination: Catholic
- Sui iuris church: Latin Church
- Rite: Roman Rite
- Established: February 24, 1987
- Cathedral: Cathedral of the Immaculate Conception
- Patron saint: Our Lady of the Immaculate Conception

Current leadership
- Pope: Leo XIV
- Bishop: Gregory Kelly
- Metropolitan Archbishop: Joe S. Vásquez

Map
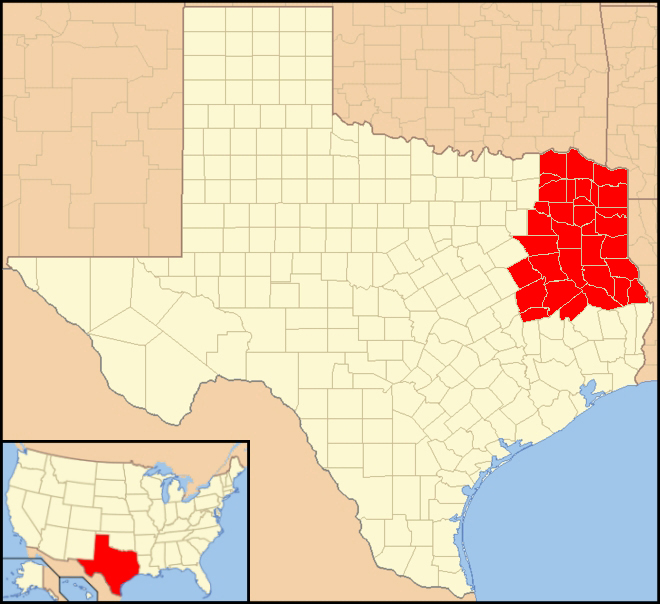

Website
- dioceseoftyler.org

The Diocese of Tyler (Latin: Dioecesis Tylerensis) is a diocese of the Catholic Church in eastern Texas in the United States. It is a suffragan diocese of the Archdiocese of Galveston-Houston. The episcopal see is Tyler; the mother church is the Cathedral of the Immaculate Conception.

== Territory ==
The Diocese of Tyler encompasses the east Texas counties of Anderson, Angelina, Bowie, Camp, Cass, Cherokee, Delta, Franklin, Freestone, Gregg, Harrison, Henderson, Hopkins, Houston, Lamar, Leon, Madison, Marion, Morris, Nacogdoches, Panola, Rains, Red River, Rusk, Sabine, San Augustine, Shelby, Smith, Titus, Trinity, Upshur, Van Zandt, and Wood.

The parishes are grouped into seven deaneries for administrative purposes: Northwest, Northeast, West Central, Central, East Central, Southwest, and Southeast.

== History ==
=== 1690 to 1900 ===
The first Catholic mission in Texas, then part of the Spanish colony of New Spain, was San Francisco de los Tejas. It was founded by the Franciscan friar Damián Massanet in 1690 in the Weches area. The priests left the mission after three years, then established a second mission, Nuestro Padre San Francisco de los Tejas, near present-day Alto in 1716. With the end of the Mexican War of Independence in 1821, Texas became part of the new nation of Mexico.

In 1839, three years after the founding of the Republic of Texas, Pope Gregory XVI erected the prefecture apostolic of Texas, largely covering the territory of the present State of Texas. By the 1840s, Catholic missionaries were visiting Clarksville and Nacogdoches. The prefecture was elevated to a vicariate apostolic in 1842, about three years before Texas became an American state. On May 4, 1847, Pope Pius IX elevated the vicariate into the Diocese of Galveston. Marshall received its first missionary visit in 1853. The Tyler area would remain part of several Texas dioceses for the next 139 years.

Immaculate Conception Parish, the first in Jefferson, was established in 1867. During the early 1870s, Theodore Buffard would travel from Galveston to North Texas to conduct services in hotels and private houses. Sacred Heart Church, the first in Texarkana, was dedicated in 1871. The first parish in Tyler was Immaculate Conception, founded in 1878 to serve Irish railway workers in the area. In 1880, St. Anthony's was established as a mission church in Longview, with its church constructed in 1884. The Benedictine Sisters in 1892 opened St. Joseph Academy in Tyler, the first formal Catholic school in the present-day diocese.

=== 1900 to 2000 ===
The Sisters of Charity of the Incarnate Word from Houston opened Michael Meagher Memorial Hospital in Texarkana in 1916. An Irish civil engineer, Meagher had died in 1909, leaving his $75,000 estate to the sisters to open a hospital in the city. Today the facility is known as CHRISTUS St. Michael Hospital.

A contingent of the Sisters of the Holy Family of Nazareth arrived in Tyler in 1937 to open Mother Frances Hospital. Today it is CHRISTUS Mother Frances Hospital. In 1945, a contingent of Dominican sisters moved from Farmington Hills, Michigan to Lufkin to set up the Monastery of the Infant Jesus. Pope John Paul II founded the Diocese of Tyler on December 12, 1986, and it was formally erected on February 24, 1987. The pope appointed Charles Herzig of the Diocese of Galveston-Houston as its first bishop. Herzig died in 1991. Immaculate Conception Church in Tyler was then designated as the Cathedral of the Immaculate Conception.

Auxiliary Bishop Edmond Carmody became the next bishop in 1992. During his tenure, Carmody oversaw the founding of many new parishes in the diocese. In 1997, Reverend Gustavo Cuello was arrested on charges of raping a 13-year-old altar girl. The victim said that he attacked her once or twice a week for six months. After posting bail, Cuello fled to his native Ecuador. In 2003, Ecuador extradited him back to the United States. At his trial, Cuello pleaded guilty and was sentenced to life in prison. The Vatican laicized him in 2006.

=== 2000 to present ===
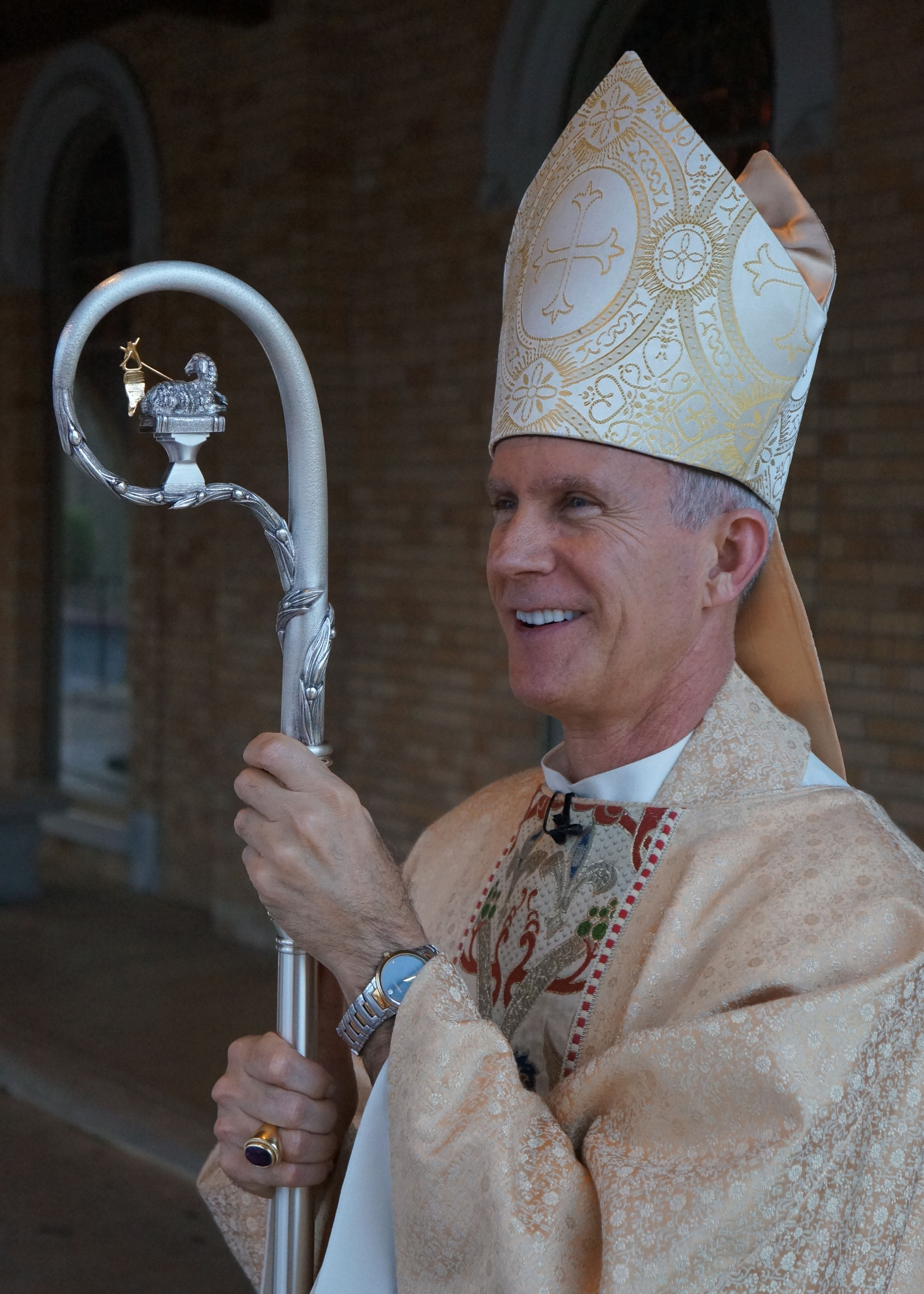
Bishop Strickland (2013)

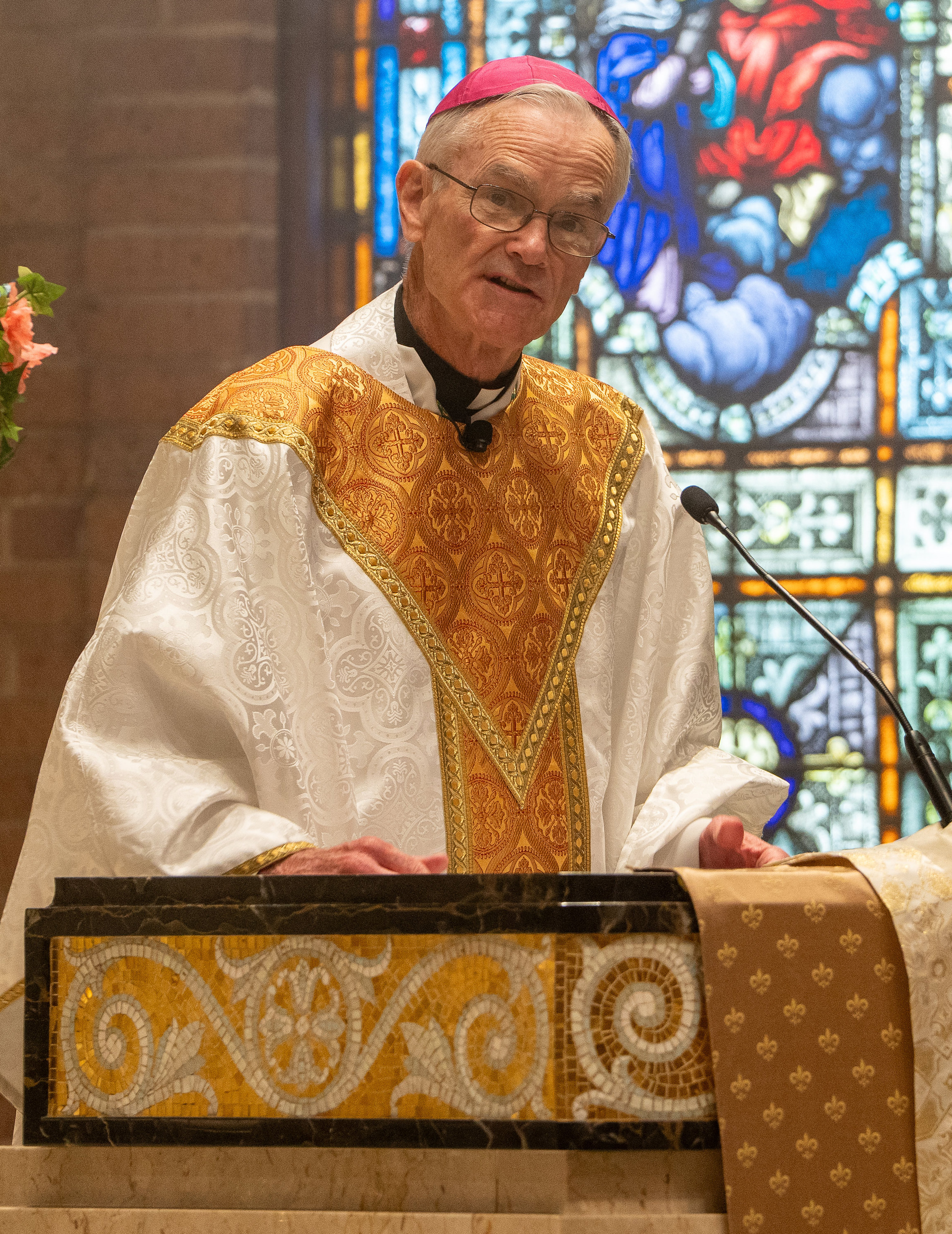
Bishop Kelly ( 2025)

The pope named Carmody as bishop of the Diocese of Corpus Christi in 2000. Auxiliary Bishop Álvaro Corrada del Río from the Archdiocese of Washington replaced him in 2001. del Rio transferred to the Diocese of Mayagüez in Puerto Rico in 2011.

Joseph Strickland of the Diocese of Dallas was named bishop of Tyler by Benedict XVI in 2011. Strickland was the first native East Texan to head the diocese. In February 2019, the diocese published the names of three priests associated with the diocese who had been credibly accused of sexually abusing minors. Only one of the three, Cuello, had allegations reported within the diocese.

In May 2023, Strickland posted online "I reject [Pope Francis's] program of undermining the Deposit of Faith". In June 2023, it was revealed that the Dicastery for Bishops in Rome had completed an apostolic visitation to the diocese. It had been conducted by Bishop Emeritus Gerald Kicanas and Bishop Dennis Sullivan. Visitations are frequently a prelude to disciplinary action by the Vatican against a bishop. After the apostolic visitation, several senior cardinals allegedly advised Francis to pressure on Strickland into resigning.

Pope Francis removed Strickland as bishop of Tyler in November 2023. Bishop Joe Vasquez of the Diocese of Austin was appointed as apostolic administrator of the diocese. In December 2024, Auxiliary Bishop Gregory Kelly of the Diocese of Dallas was made the new bishop of Tyler. That same month, the Vatican sent a letter to the cathedral parish, order it to stop all celebrations of the Traditional Latin Mass.

== Bishops of Tyler ==
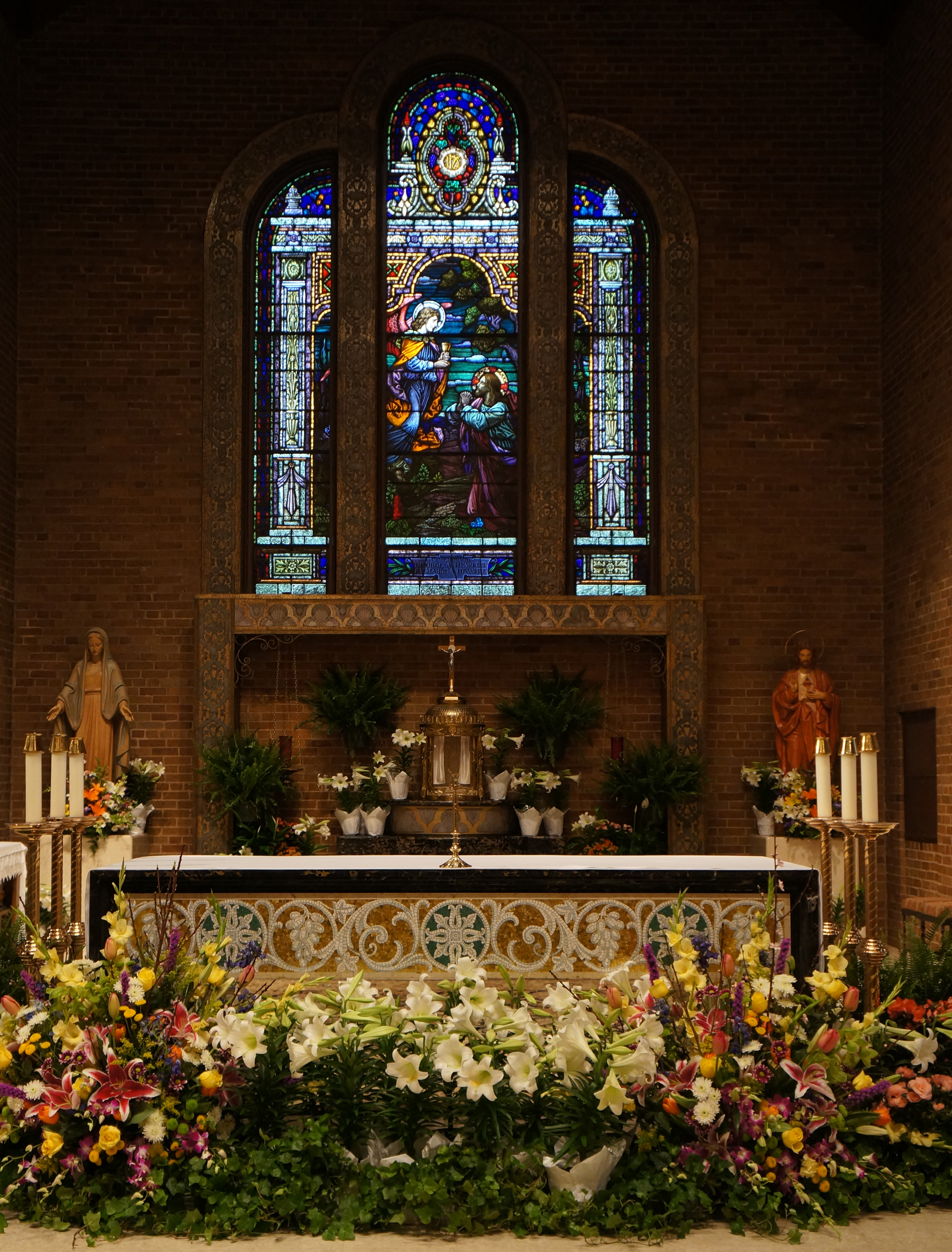
Cathedral of the Immaculate Conception (2012)

1. Charles Edwin Herzig (1986–1991), died in office
2. Edmond Carmody (1992–2000), appointed Bishop of Corpus Christi
3. Álvaro Corrada del Río (2000–2011), appointed Bishop of Mayagüez in Puerto Rico
4. Joseph E. Strickland (2012–2023), removed by Pope Francis
  - Joe S. Vásquez, as apostolic administrator (2023–2024)
5. Gregory Kelly (2025–present)

== Other diocesan priests who became bishop ==
- Eduardo Alanis Nevares, appointed Auxiliary Bishop of Phoenix in 2010
- John Jairo Gomez, appointed Bishop of Laredo in 2026

== Education ==
As of 2026, the Diocese of Tyler has three high schools and two elementary schools.

=== High schools ===
- Bishop T. K. Gorman Catholic School – Tyler
- St. Mary's Catholic School – Longview
- St. Boniface Catholic High School – Nacogdoches
