= Holy Trinity Seminary =

Roman Catholic seminary residence in Irving, Texas, United States

Coordinates: 32.849605°N 96.922641°W

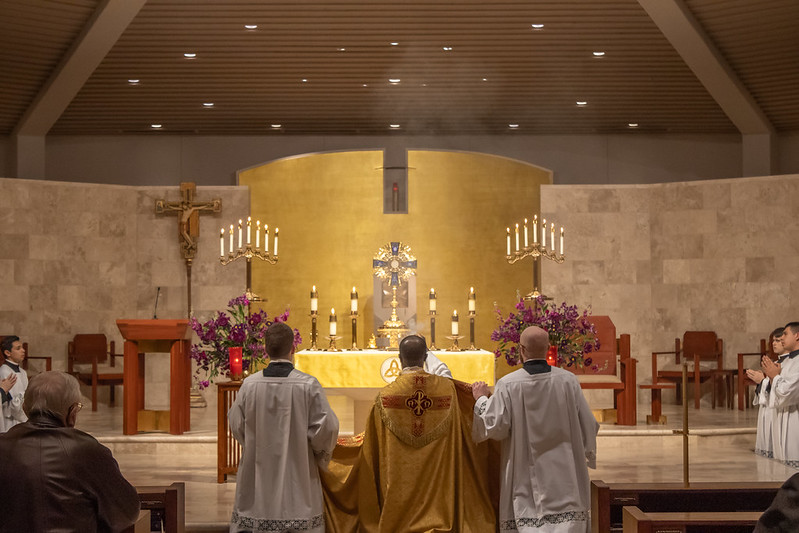
Forty Hours Devotion at Holy Trinity Seminary

Holy Trinity Seminary is a Catholic seminary residence in Irving, Texas, United States, in the Diocese of Dallas, Texas. It was founded in 1965 and is located within the University of Dallas campus. It is headed by Fr. Vincent Anyama.

Seminarians at Holy Trinity Seminary attend classes at the University of Dallas. The University of Dallas is an independent Catholic university with strong ties to the Diocese of Dallas. As a non-degree-granting academic residence, Holy Trinity Seminary is not separately accredited by any accrediting organization, but is approved by the Diocese of Dallas and the Holy See for the formation of candidates for the priesthood prior to receiving the sacrament of holy orders.

== Intellectual Formation ==
As a part of their intellectual formation, seminarians of Holy Trinity Seminary attend classes at the University of Dallas. During their time at the university, seminarians undergo studies in philosophy and letters. This degree was designed specifically for seminarians, as it seeks to prepare them for their later priestly duties—particularly such that they gain a robust knowledge of first principles, which will in turn help their preaching, intellectual life, and ability to tend to the spiritual needs of parishioners.

Seminarians who have not already earned a bachelor's degree prior to their entry into seminary graduate with a degree. Those seminarians who have already earned a bachelor's degree prior to their entry into seminary do not graduate with a degree, but rather are given a Certificate of Propaedeutic Studies. Holy Trinity Seminary does not itself grant degrees, but rather serves as a residence for seminarians as they take classes at the University of Dallas, which neighbors the seminary.

== Human Formation ==
In addition to their coursework at the University of Dallas, seminarians preparing for the priesthood at Holy Trinity Seminary are assigned house jobs and a weekly, communal work order so they learn to think of the seminary as their house and to accept responsibility for its maintenance.

== Pastoral Formation ==
Seminarians partake in different pastoral ministry assignments across the Diocese of Dallas, including Youth Ministry programs, O.C.I.A. programs, and hospital chaplaincy. They meet regularly with the Director of Pastoral Formation to discuss, unpack, and reflect on their pastoral experiences.

== Alleged involvement in sexual scandals ==
In the 1970s Holy Trinity Seminary is accused of having ignored and lied about seminarians who were sexually abusive towards others, especially those who showed signs of homosexuality. One of the most infamous cases is of Rudolph (Rudy) Kos who entered the seminary at the age of 30 despite the fact that he had an abusive record from his previous marriage and having failed the psychological evaluation, and was later revealed to be a pathological liar and to have sexually abused his two brothers growing up. Kos was eventually ordained for the Roman Catholic Diocese of Dallas in 1990 and has been accused of abusing multiple boys before he was removed from the ministry in 1992.
